= Sloane shadow ministry =

Shadow ministry of opposition leader Kellie Sloane

- Shadow cabinet of New South Wales

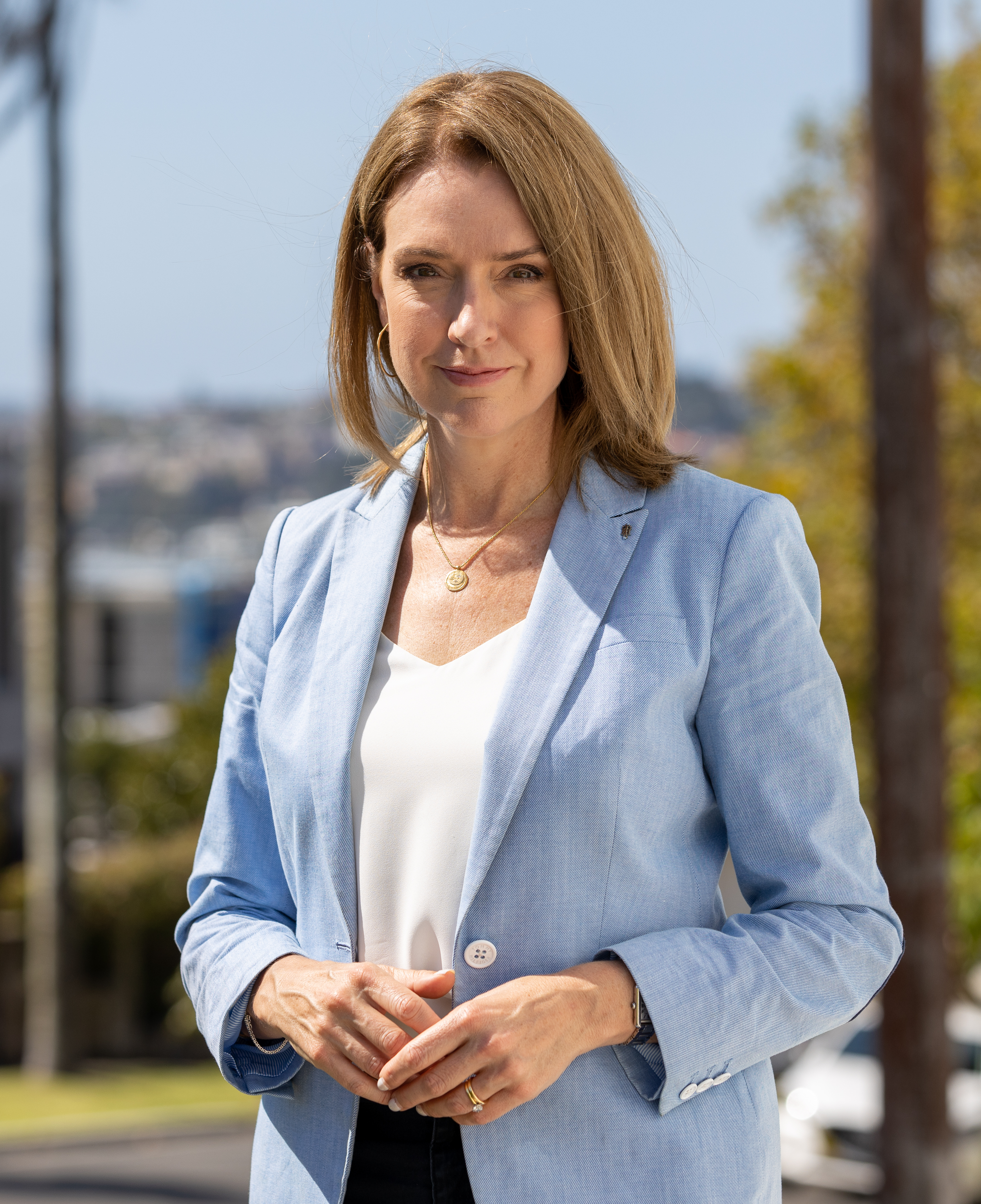
- Kellie Sloane
- Date formed: 21 November 2025

People and organisations
- Opposition Leader: Kellie Sloane
- Deputy Opposition Leaders: Justin Clancy; Sarah Mitchell
- Member parties: Liberal–National coalition
- Status in legislature: Opposition

History
- Election: 2023
- Legislature term: 58th
- Predecessor: Speakman shadow ministry

The shadow ministry of Kellie Sloane is the shadow cabinet of New South Wales since November 2025, serving in opposition to the Minns government. The shadow ministry is the Opposition's alternative to the Minns ministry. It was formed following the 2025 New South Wales Liberal Party leadership election where Kellie Sloane was elected leader of the New South Wales Liberal Party and Leader of the Opposition.

== Current arrangement ==
The current arrangement of the shadow ministry was announced on 6 January 2026. This arrangement was intended to be announced before Christmas 2025, but the announcement was delayed due to the Bondi Beach shooting.

Among the new shadow ministers was Monica Tudehope, who joined her father Damien in the shadow ministry. The previous party leader, Mark Speakman, was also returned to the shadow ministry.

Colour key

(for political parties)

Liberal
National

=== Shadow cabinet ===
Portrait	Shadow Minister	Portfolio	Party	Electorate
	Kellie Sloane	Leader of the Opposition; Leader of the New South Wales Liberal Party	Liberal	Vaucluse (2023–)
	Gurmesh Singh	Leader of the New South Wales National Party; Shadow Minister for Regional New South Wales; Shadow Minister for Small Business; Shadow Minister for Trade; Shadow Minister for the North Coast	National	Coffs Harbour (2019–)
	Hon Natalie Ward	Deputy Leader of the Liberal Party; Deputy Leader of the Liberal Party in the Legislative Council; Shadow Minister for Transport and Infrastructure; Shadow Minister for Sport	Liberal	Legislative Council (2017–)
	Hon Kevin Anderson	Deputy Leader of the New South Wales National Party; Shadow Minister for Hospitality and Gaming; Shadow Minister for Tourism; Shadow Minister for Western NSW; Shadow Minister for Seniors	National	Tamworth (2011–)
	Hon Damien Tudehope	Leader of the Opposition in the Legislative Council; Shadow Attorney General; Shadow Minister for Youth Justice	Liberal	Epping (2015–2019); Legislative Council (2019–)
	Hon Sarah Mitchell	Deputy Leader of the Opposition in the Legislative Council; Shadow Minister for Health; Shadow Minister for Regional Health; Shadow Minister for Mental Health	National	Legislative Council (2011–)
	Alister Henskens	Shadow Special Minister of State; Shadow Minister for Government Accountability	Liberal	Ku-ring-gai (2015–2023) Wahroonga (2023–)
	Hon Natasha Maclaren-Jones	Shadow Minister for Families and Communities; Shadow Minister for Prevention of Domestic Violence and Sexual Assault; Shadow Minister for Disability Inclusion; Shadow Minister for Homelessness; Shadow Minister for Youth	Liberal	Legislative Council (2011–2023, 2023–)
	Hon Scott Farlow	Shadow Treasurer; Shadow Minister for the Hunter	Liberal	Legislative Council (2023–)
	Hon Mark Speakman	Shadow Minister for Education	Liberal	Cronulla (2011–)
	Hon Paul Toole	Shadow Minister for Regional Transport and Roads	National	Bathurst (2011–)
	James Griffin	Manager of Opposition Business in the Legislative Assembly; Shadow Minister for Energy and Climate Change; Shadow Minister for Digital, Artificial Intelligence and Investment; Shadow Minister for Customer Service	Liberal	Manly (2017–)
	Mark Coure	Shadow Minister for Roads; Shadow Minister for Multiculturalism; Shadow Minister for South-Western Sydney	Liberal	Oatley (2011–)
	Eleni Petinos	Shadow Minister for Finance; Shadow Minister for Sport	Liberal	Miranda (2015–)
	Justin Clancy	Shadow Minister for Skills, TAFE and Tertiary Education; Shadow Minister for Medical Research; Deputy Leader of the Liberal Party in the Legislative Assembly	Liberal	Albury (2019–)
	Steph Cooke	Shadow Minister for Water; Shadow Minister for Crown Lands	National	Cootamundra (2017–)
	Tim James	Shadow Minister for Fair Trading, Work Health and Safety and Building; Shadow Minister for Local Government; Shadow Minister for Veterans	Liberal	Willoughby (2022–)
	Hon Aileen MacDonald	Shadow Minister for Youth Justice	Liberal	Legislative Council (2022–)
	Hon Natasha Maclaren-Jones	Shadow Minister for Families and Communities; Shadow Minister for Prevention of Domestic Violence and Sexual Assault; Shadow Minister for Disability Inclusion; Shadow Minister for Homelessness; Shadow Minister for Youth	Liberal	Legislative Council (2023–)
	Dave Layzell	Shadow Minister for Mining and Natural Resources; Shadow Minister for Racing	National	Upper Hunter (2021–)
	Hon Chris Rath	Shadow Minister for Planning and Public Spaces; Shadow Minister for Housing; Shadow Minister for Cities; Shadow Minister for the Arts; Shadow Minister for the Illawarra and South Coast	Liberal	Legislative Council (2022–)
	Felicity Wilson	Shadow Minister for Women; Shadow Minister for Aboriginal Affairs	Liberal	North Shore (2017–)
	Geoff Provest	Shadow Minister for Flood Recovery; Shadow Minister for Seniors	National	Tweed (2007–)
	Adam Crouch	Shadow Minister for Corrections; Shadow Minister for the Central Coast; Opposition Whip	Liberal	Terrigal (2015–)
	Hon Anthony Roberts	Shadow Minister for Police and Counter-terrorism; Shadow Minister for Corrections	Liberal	Lane Cove (2003–)
	Hon Eleni Petinos	Shadow Minister for Jobs; Shadow Minister for Industry and Domestic Manufacturing	Liberal	Miranda (2015–)
	Monica Tudehope	Shadow Minister for Finance; Shadow Minister for Western Sydney	Liberal	Epping (2024–)
	Tanya Thompson	Shadow Minister for Emergency Services; Shadow Minister for Disaster Recovery	National	Myall Lakes (2023–)
	James Wallace	Shadow Minister for Industrial Relations; Shadow Minister for Government Procurement	Liberal	Hornsby (2024–)
	Hon Jacqui Munro	Shadow Minister for the Environment; Shadow Minister for Science and Technology; Shadow Minister for Heritage; Shadow Minister for the Central Coast	Liberal	Legislative Council (2023–)
	Brendan Moylan	Shadow Minister for Agriculture; Shadow Minister for Prevention of Regional Crime	National	Northern Tablelands (2024–)

== Interim arrangement ==
Between November 2025 and January 2026 on an interim basis, the shadow ministry was unchanged from the previous Speakman shadow ministry, with the exception of Speakman being in the backbench and Sloane being the opposition leader (in addition to her role as shadow health minister).
