= Opposition (New South Wales) =

The Opposition in the Australian state of New South Wales comprises the largest party or coalition of parties not in Government. The Opposition's purpose is to hold the Government to account and constitute a "Government-in-waiting" should the existing Government fall. To that end, a Leader of the Opposition and Shadow Ministers for the various government departments question the Premier and Ministers on Government policy and administration, and formulate the policy the Opposition would pursue in Government. It is sometimes styled "His Majesty's Loyal Opposition" to demonstrate that although it opposes the Government, it remains loyal to the King.

The Leader of the Opposition is currently Liberal Leader Kellie Sloane since 2025.

== Current shadow cabinet ==
Party	Shadow Minister	Portrait	Offices	Electorate	Ref
Liberal	Kellie Sloane		Leader of the Opposition; Leader of the New South Wales Liberal Party; Shadow Minister for Health	Vaucluse (2023–)	
National	Gurmesh Singh		Leader of the New South Wales National Party; Shadow Minister for Regional Health; Shadow Minister for Regional New South Wales; Shadow Minister for Agriculture, Trade and Natural Resources; Shadow Minister for Emergency Services; Shadow Minister for the North Coast	Coffs Harbour (2019–)	
Liberal	Hon Natalie Ward		Deputy Leader of the Liberal Party; Deputy Leader of the Liberal Party in the Legislative Council; Shadow Minister for Transport and Roads; Shadow Minister for Infrastructure	Legislative Council (2017–)	
National	Hon Kevin Anderson		Deputy Leader of the New South Wales National Party; Shadow Minister for Tourism; Shadow Minister for Gaming and Racing; Shadow Minister for the Arts and Heritage	Tamworth (2011–)	
Liberal	Hon Damien Tudehope		Leader of the Opposition in the Legislative Council; Shadow Treasurer; Shadow Minister for Industrial Relations	Epping (2015–2019); Legislative Council (2019–)	
National	Hon Sarah Mitchell		Deputy Leader of the Opposition in the Legislative Council; Shadow Minister for Education and Early Learning; Shadow Minister for Western New South Wales	Legislative Council (2011–)	
Liberal	Robyn Preston		Shadow Minister for Mental Health and Medical Research; Shadow Minister for Veterans; Shadow Minister for Western Sydney	Hawkesbury (2019–)	
Liberal	Alister Henskens		Shadow Attorney General; Manager of Opposition Business in the New South Wales Legislative Assembly	Ku-ring-gai (2015–2023); Wahroonga (2023–)	
Liberal	Hon Natasha Maclaren-Jones		Shadow Minister for Families and Communities; Shadow Minister for Prevention of Domestic Violence and Sexual Assault; Shadow Minister for Disability Inclusion; Shadow Minister for Homelessness; Shadow Minister for Youth	Legislative Council (2011–2023, 2023–)	
Liberal	Hon Scott Farlow		Shadow Minister for Planning and Public Spaces; Shadow Minister for the Hunter; Shadow Minister for Housing; Shadow Minister for Cities	Legislative Council (2023–)	
National	Hon Paul Toole		Shadow Minister for Police and Counter-terrorism	Bathurst (2011–)	
Liberal	James Griffin		Shadow Minister for Energy, Climate Change and Environment; Shadow Minister for Customer Service and Digital Government	Manly (2017–)	
Liberal	Mark Coure		Shadow Minister for Multiculturalism; Shadow Minister for Jobs, Industry, Innovation, Science and Technology; Shadow Minister for South-Western Sydney	Oatley (2011–)	
Liberal	Eleni Petinos		Shadow Minister for Finance; Shadow Minister for Sport	Miranda (2015–)	
Liberal	Justin Clancy		Shadow Minister for Skills, TAFE and Tertiary Education; Deputy Leader of the Liberal Party in the Legislative Assembly	Albury (2019–)	
National	Steph Cooke		Shadow Minister for Water; Shadow Minister for Crown Lands	Cootamundra (2017–)	
Liberal	Tim James		Shadow Minister for Small Business; Shadow Minister for Fair Trading, Work Health and Safety and Building	Willoughby (2022–)	
Liberal	Hon Aileen MacDonald		Shadow Minister for Youth Justice	Legislative Council (2022–)	
National	Dave Layzell		Shadow Minister for Regional Transport and Roads	Upper Hunter (2021–)	
Liberal	Adam Crouch		Shadow Minister for Corrections; Shadow Minister for the Central Coast; Opposition Whip	Terrigal (2015–)	
Liberal	Hon Chris Rath		Shadow Special Minister of State; Shadow Minister for Local Government; Shadow Minister for the Illawarra and South Coast; Opposition Whip in the Legislative Council	Legislative Council (2022–)	
Liberal	Felicity Wilson		Shadow Minister for Women; Shadow Minister for Aboriginal Affairs	North Shore (2017–)	
National	Geoff Provest		Shadow Minister for Flood Recovery; Shadow Minister for Seniors	Tweed (2007–)	

== See also ==
- Opposition (Australia)
- Leader of the Opposition (New South Wales)
