= List of New South Wales government agencies =

Logo of the New South Wales Government and its agencies

The New South Wales Government (NSW Government) is made up of a number of departments, state-owned corporations and other agencies. The NSW Public Service is organised under the Government Sector Employment Act 2013, with public bodies organised under various legislation. In 2009, most of the 100+ government organisations were restructured into 13 'super agencies' or clusters. This number was subsequently reduced to ten clusters in 2013; and in July 2019 following the 2019 state election, it was further reduced to eight clusters. A new cluster for Regional NSW was created in April 2020, increasing to nine clusters; and a further cluster, Enterprise, Investment and Trade, established on 21 December 2021, in the second Perrottet ministry.

== Agency types ==
The executive government is made up of:

- ministerial departments, which are the lead agencies in each cluster
- executive agencies, which are agencies related to departments
- separate agencies, which operate independently of departments but can still be within clusters
- statutory authorities, which are established under legislation but sit outside clusters
- state-owned corporations
- subsidiaries of the NSW Government established under the Corporations Act
- councils under the Local Government Act
- universities.

There are also a number of advisory boards and committees, though these are not agencies in their own right.

== Departments ==
As of October 2024, the departments and their ministers are:

Department	Office title(s)	Officeholder(s)
Premier's Department	Premier; Special Minister of State and Minister for Jobs and Tourism; Minister for the Illawarra and the South Coast; Minister for Industrial Relations; Minister for the Hunter; Minister for Emergency Services; Minister for Regional New South Wales and Minister for Western New South Wales; Minister for Domestic Manufacturing and Government Procurement; Minister for the North Coast; Minister for Industry and Trade and Minister for Innovation, Science and Technology; Minister for Aboriginal Affairs and Treaty and Minister for the Central Coast	Chris Minns; John Graham; Ryan Park; Sophie Cotsis; Yasmin Catley; Jihad Dib; Tara Moriarty; Courtney Houssos; Rose Jackson; Anoulack Chanthivong; David Harris
Cabinet Office	Premier; Special Minister of State; Minister for Women	Chris Minns; John Graham; Jodie Harrison
Education	Deputy Premier and Minister for Education and Early Learning; Minister for Skills, TAFE and Tertiary Education	Prue Car; Steve Whan
Climate Change, Energy, the Environment and Water	Minister for Climate Change, Minister for the Environment, Minister for Energy and Minister for Heritage; Minister for Water	Penny Sharpe; Rose Jackson
Creative Industries, Tourism, Hospitality and Sport	Minister for the Arts, Minister for Music and the Night-time Economy and Minister for Jobs and Tourism; Minister for Sport; Minister for Gaming and Racing	John Graham; Steve Kamper; David Harris
Treasury	Treasurer; Minister for Finance and Minister for Domestic Manufacturing and Government Procurement; Minister for Industrial Relations and Minister for Work Health and Safety	Daniel Mookhey; Courtney Houssos; Sophie Cotsis
Planning, Housing and Infrastructure	Minister for Planning and Public Spaces; Minister for Western Sydney; Attorney General; Minister for Local Government; Minister for Lands and Property; Minister for Housing	Paul Scully; Prue Car; Michael Daley; Ron Hoenig; Steve Kamper; Rose Jackson
Health	Minister for Health and Minister for Regional Health; Minister for Mental Health; Minister for Medical Research	Ryan Park; Rose Jackson; David Harris
Transport	Minister for Transport; Minister for Roads; Minister for Regional Transport and Roads	John Graham; John Graham; Jenny Aitchison
Primary Industries and Regional Development	Minister for Regional New South Wales, Minister for Agriculture and Minister for Western New South Wales; Minister for the Environment; Minister for the Illawarra and the South Coast; Minister for the Hunter; Minister for Natural Resources; Minister for Youth and Minister for the North Coast; Minister for the Central Coast	Tara Moriarty; Penny Sharpe; Ryan Park; Yasmin Catley; Courtney Houssos; Rose Jackson; David Harris
Communities and Justice	Attorney General; Minister for Police and Counter-terrorism; Minister for Emergency Services and Minister for Youth Justice; Minister for Families and Communities and Minister for Disability Inclusion; Minister for Multiculturalism; Minister for Housing, Minister for Homelessness and Minister for Youth; Minister for Corrections; Minister for Veterans; Minister for Seniors and Minister for the Prevention of Domestic Violence and Sexual Assault	Michael Daley; Yasmin Catley; Jihad Dib; Kate Washington; Steve Kamper; Rose Jackson; Anoulack Chanthivong; David Harris; Jodie Harrison
Customer Service	Minister for Customer Service and Digital Government; Minister for the Arts; Minister for Work Health and Safety; Minister for Finance and Minister for Domestic Manufacturing and Government Procurement; Minister for Small Business; Minister for Better Regulation and Fair Trading and Minister for Building	Jihad Dib; John Graham; Sophie Cotsis; Courtney Houssos; Steve Kamper; Anoulack Chanthivong

== List of agencies ==
=== Departments ===
Agency	Type	Cluster	Employees	Notes
Premier's Department	Department	Premier and Cabinet	834	
The Cabinet Office	Department	Premier and Cabinet	834	
Department of Regional NSW	Department	Regional NSW	3,067	
Department of Enterprise, Investment and Trade	Department	Enterprise, Investment and Trade		
Treasury	Department	Treasury	784	
Ministry of Health	Department	Health	127,156	
Department of Education	Department	Education	99,702	
Department of Communities and Justice	Department	Stronger Communities	22,903	
Department of Transport	Department	Transport	11,875	
Department of Customer Service	Department	Customer Service	5,345	
Department of Planning and Environment	Department	Planning and Environment		

=== Executive agencies ===
This is a list of executive agencies of the NSW Government, as listed in Schedule 4 of the Administrative Arrangements (Second Perrottet Ministry—Transitional) Order 2021, containing Amendment No. 40 to the Government Sector Employment Act 2013:

Agency	Cluster	Employees	Notes
Art Gallery of New South Wales Trust	Enterprise, Investment and Trade	266	
Australian Museum Trust	Enterprise, Investment and Trade	346	
Create NSW	Enterprise, Investment and Trade		
Crown Solicitor's Office	Stronger Communities	443	
Destination NSW	Enterprise, Investment and Trade	199	
Fire & Rescue NSW	Stronger Communities	15,589	
Greater Sydney Commission	Transport	82	
Health Professional Councils Authority	Health	186	
Infrastructure NSW	Transport	158	
Library Council of New South Wales	Enterprise, Investment and Trade	297	
Local Land Services	Regional NSW	956	
Mental Health Commission	Health	303	
Multicultural NSW	Stronger Communities	67	
Natural Resources Commission	Planning and Environment	33	
NSW Institute of Sport	Enterprise, Investment and Trade	90	
NSW Rural Fire Service	Stronger Communities	936	
NSW State Emergency Service	Stronger Communities	365	
Office of Sport	Enterprise, Investment and Trade	368	
Parliamentary Counsel's Office	Premier and Cabinet	74	
Museum of Applied Arts and Sciences	Premier and Cabinet	281	
Resilience NSW	Stronger Communities	105	
SAS Trustee Corporation	Treasury	32	
Service NSW	Customer Service	3433	
State Archives and Records Authority	Enterprise, Investment and Trade		
Sydney Opera House Trust	Enterprise, Investment and Trade	499	
Transport Asset Manager of New South Wales	Transport		
Venues NSW	Enterprise, Investment and Trade		
Western Parkland City Authority	Enterprise, Investment and Trade	29	

=== Separate agencies ===
This is a list of separate agencies of the NSW Government, as listed in Schedule 1 of the Government Sector Employment Act 2013:

Agency	Cluster	Employees	Notes
Environment Protection Authority	Planning and Environment	586	
Greyhound Welfare and Integrity Commission	Planning and Environment	84	
Health Care Complaints Commission	Health	125	
Independent Liquor and Gaming Authority	Enterprise, Investment and Trade		
Independent Pricing and Regulatory Tribunal	Premier and Cabinet		
Information and Privacy Commission	Customer Service	34	
Inspector of the Law Enforcement Conduct Commission	Premier and Cabinet	1	
Law Enforcement Conduct Commission	Stronger Communities	2	
Legal Aid Commission of New South Wales	Stronger Communities	1440	
New South Wales Crime Commission	Stronger Communities	121	
New South Wales Electoral Commission	Premier and Cabinet	165	
NSW Education Standards Authority	Education	437	
Office of the Children's Guardian	Stronger Communities	219	
Office of the Director of Public Prosecutions	Stronger Communities	141	
Office of the Independent Planning Commission	Planning and Environment	15	
Ombudsman	Premier and Cabinet	122	
Public Service Commission	Premier and Cabinet	144	
Technical & Further Education Commission	Education	10,599	

=== Statutory State-owned corporations ===
This is a list of statutory State-owned corporations of the NSW Government, as listed in Schedule 5 of the State Owned Corporations Act 1989:

Agency	Cluster	Employees	Notes
Essential Energy	Planning and Environment	3,044	
Forestry Corporation	Regional NSW	549	
Hunter Water	Planning and Environment	485	
Landcom	Planning and Environment		
Port Authority of New South Wales	Transport	361	
Sydney Water	Planning and Environment	2,939	
WaterNSW	Planning and Environment	958	

=== Other agencies ===
Agency	Type	Cluster	Employees	Notes
Audit Office of NSW	Entity external to government	n/a	284	
Health Service	Service	Health	127,156	
Independent Commission Against Corruption	Entity external to government	n/a	118	
Judicial Commission	Entity external to government	n/a	32	
Parliament of New South Wales	Entity external to government	n/a	51	
NSW Police Force	Service	Stronger Communities	21,879	
Teaching Service	Service	Education	99,702	
Transport Service	Service	Transport	13,645	

=== Universities ===
Agency	Type	Employees	Notes
Charles Sturt University	University	2,190	
Macquarie University	University	3,737	
University of New England	University	1,408	
University of New South Wales	University	7,230	
University of Newcastle	University	2,859	
Southern Cross University	University	914	
University of Sydney	University	8,531	
University of Technology, Sydney	University	3,888	
Western Sydney University	University	3,510	
University of Wollongong	University	2,971	

== Independent statutory bodies ==
The Law and Justice Foundation of NSW is an independent statutory body, established by the Law and Justice Foundation Act 2000. It is a justice research organisation, with an explicit mandate to focus on the legal needs of the community, its aim being "to contribute to the development of a fair and equitable justice system that addresses the legal needs of the community and improves access to justice by the community, particularly by socially and economically disadvantaged people". It creates, analyses, and provides data, supports planning of legal assistance in the state, and manages a grants program. It gave the Aboriginal Justice Award from 2002 until 2017, after which funding for the award was withdrawn.
