= Minns ministry =

Government of New South Wales since 2023

- 100th ministry of New South Wales
- Incumbent
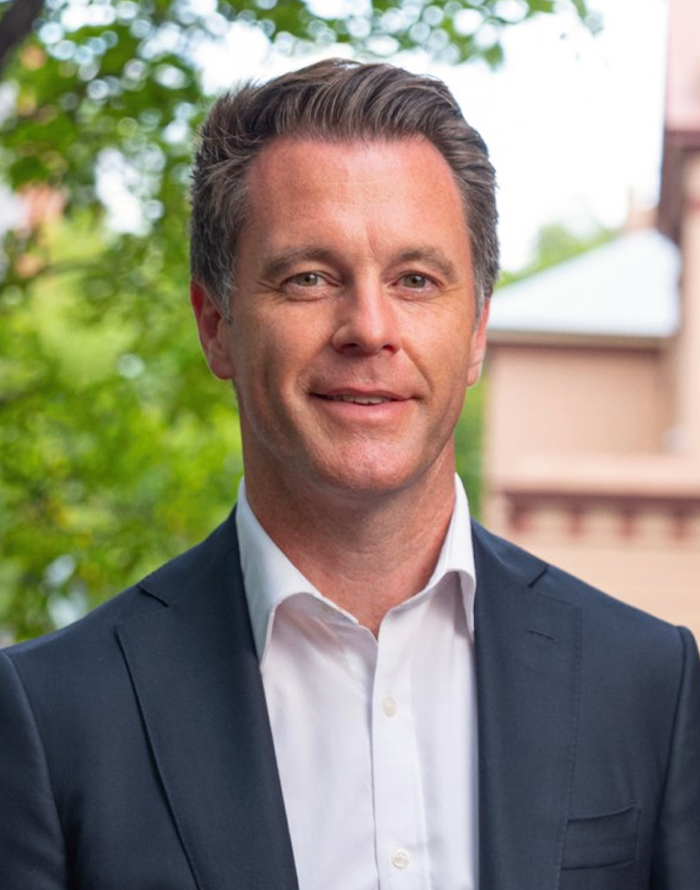
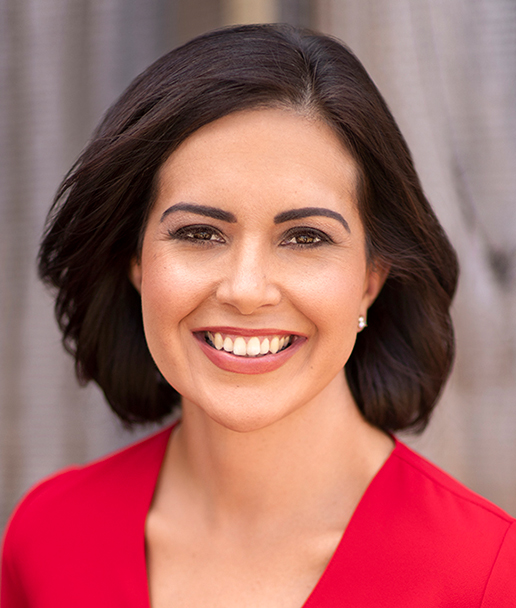
- Premier; Chris Minns Deputy Premier; Prue Car
- Date formed: 28 March 2023

People and organisations
- Monarch: Charles III
- Governor: Margaret Beazley
- Premier: Chris Minns
- Deputy Premier: Prue Car
- Member party: Labor
- Status in legislature: Minority government
- Opposition cabinet: Speakman Shadow Cabinet; Sloane Shadow Cabinet
- Opposition party: Liberal–National Coalition
- Opposition leader: Mark Speakman; Kellie Sloane

History
- Election: 2023
- Legislature term: 58th
- Predecessor: Second Perrottet ministry

The Minns ministry is the 100th ministry of the Government of New South Wales, led by Chris Minns, the state's 47th premier following his party's victory in the 2023 state election.

== Ministry ==
The full ministry was announced on 4 April 2023 and was sworn in the following day on 5 April. All Ministers are members of the New South Wales Labor Party.

=== Current composition ===
Portrait	Minister	Portfolio	Took office	Left office	Duration of tenure	Electorate
	Chris Minns MP	Premier	28 March 2023	Incumbent	3 years, 138 days	Kogarah
	Prue Car MP	Deputy Premier; Minister for Education and Early Learning	28 March 2023	Incumbent	3 years, 138 days	Londonderry
	Prue Car MP	Minister for Western Sydney	5 April 2023	Incumbent	3 years, 130 days	Londonderry
	Prue Car MP	Minister for Skills, TAFE and Tertiary Education	3 August 2023	28 September 2023	56 days	Londonderry
	Penny Sharpe MLC	Leader of the Government in the Legislative Council; Minister for the Environment; Minister for Heritage	28 March 2023	Incumbent	3 years, 138 days	Legislative Council
	Penny Sharpe MLC	Minister for Climate Change; Minister for Energy	6 April 2023	Incumbent	3 years, 129 days	Legislative Council
	John Graham MLC	Deputy Leader of the Government in the Legislative Council; Special Minister of State; Minister for the Arts; Minister for Music and the Night-time Economy	28 March 2023	Incumbent	3 years, 138 days	Legislative Council
	John Graham MLC	Minister for Roads	28 March 2023	17 March 2025	1 year, 354 days	Legislative Council
	John Graham MLC	Minister for Jobs and Tourism	6 April 2023	17 March 2025	1 year, 345 days	Legislative Council
	John Graham MLC	Minister for Transport	6 February 2025	Incumbent	1 year, 188 days	Legislative Council
	Daniel Mookhey MLC	Treasurer	28 March 2023	Incumbent	3 years, 138 days	Legislative Council
	Ryan Park MP	Minister for Health; Minister for Regional Health; Minister for the Illawarra and South Coast	28 March 2023	Incumbent	3 years, 138 days	Keira
	Paul Scully MP	Minister for Planning and Public Spaces	5 April 2023	Incumbent	3 years, 130 days	Wollongong
	Sophie Cotsis MP	Minister for Industrial Relations; Minister for Work Health and Safety	5 April 2023	Incumbent	3 years, 130 days	Canterbury
	Yasmin Catley MP	Minister for Police and Counter-terrorism	5 April 2023	Incumbent	3 years, 130 days	Swansea
	Yasmin Catley MP	Minister for the Hunter	3 August 2023	Incumbent	3 years, 10 days	Swansea
	Jihad Dib MP	Minister for Customer Service and Digital Government; Minister for Emergency Services; Minister for Youth Justice	5 April 2023	Incumbent	3 years, 130 days	Bankstown
	Kate Washington MP	Minister for Families and Communities; Minister for Disability Inclusion	5 April 2023	Incumbent	3 years, 130 days	Port Stephens
	Michael Daley MP	Attorney General	28 March 2023	Incumbent	3 years, 138 days	Maroubra
	Tara Moriarty MLC	Minister for Agriculture; Minister for Regional New South Wales; Minister for Western New South Wales	5 April 2023	Incumbent	3 years, 130 days	Legislative Council
	Ron Hoenig MP	Leader of the House; Vice-President of the Executive Council; Minister for Local Government	5 April 2023	Incumbent	3 years, 130 days	Heffron
	Courtney Houssos MLC	Minister for Finance; Minister for Natural Resources	5 April 2023	Incumbent	3 years, 130 days	Legislative Council
	Courtney Houssos MLC	Minister for Domestic Manufacturing and Government Procurement	28 September 2023	Incumbent	2 years, 319 days	Legislative Council
	Steve Kamper MP	Minister for Lands and Property; Minister for Multiculturalism; Minister for Sport	5 April 2023	Incumbent	3 years, 130 days	Rockdale
	Steve Kamper MP	Minister for Small Business	5 April 2023	17 March 2025	1 year, 346 days	Rockdale
	Steve Kamper MP	Minister for Jobs and Tourism	17 March 2025	Incumbent	1 year, 149 days	Rockdale
	Rose Jackson MLC	Minister for Water; Minister for Housing; Minister for Homelessness; Minister for Mental Health; Minister for Youth	5 April 2023	Incumbent	3 years, 130 days	Legislative Council
	Rose Jackson MLC	Minister for the North Coast	5 April 2023	17 March 2025	1 year, 346 days	Legislative Council
	Anoulack Chanthivong MP	Minister for Better Regulation and Fair Trading; Minister for Industry and Trade; Minister for Innovation, Science and Technology; Minister for Building; Minister for Corrections	5 April 2023	Incumbent	3 years, 130 days	Macquarie Fields
	David Harris MP	Minister for Aboriginal Affairs and Treaty; Minister for Gaming and Racing; Minister for Veterans; Minister for Medical Research; Minister for the Central Coast	5 April 2023	Incumbent	3 years, 130 days	Wyong
	Jodie Harrison MP	Minister for Women; Minister for Seniors; Minister for the Prevention of Domestic Violence and Sexual Assault	5 April 2023	Incumbent	3 years, 130 days	Charlestown
	Jenny Aitchison MP	Minister for Regional Transport and Roads	5 April 2023	17 March 2025	1 year, 346 days	Maitland
	Jenny Aitchison MP	Minister for Roads; Minister for Regional Transport	17 March 2025	Incumbent	1 year, 149 days	Maitland
	Steve Whan MP	Minister for Skills, TAFE and Tertiary Education	28 September 2023	Incumbent	2 years, 319 days	Monaro
	Janelle Saffin MP	Minister for Recovery; Minister for Small Business; Minister for the North Coast	17 March 2025	Incumbent	1 year, 149 days	Lismore
Former Ministers
	Tim Crakanthorp MP	Minister for Skills, TAFE and Tertiary Education; Minister for the Hunter	5 April 2023	3 August 2023	120 days	Newcastle
	Jo Haylen	Minister for Transport	28 March 2023	6 February 2025	1 year, 315 days	Summer Hill

== Parliamentary Secretaries ==
Parliamentary Secretaries were announced on 26 April 2023. All Parliamentary Secretaries are members of the New South Wales Labor Party.

Portrait	Minister	Portfolio	Took office	Left office	Duration of tenure	Electorate
	Julia Finn MP	Parliamentary Secretary to the Premier; Parliamentary Secretary for the Arts	26 April 2023	Incumbent	3 years, 109 days	Granville
	Greg Warren MP	Parliamentary Secretary to the Deputy Premier; Parliamentary Secretary for Education and Early Learning; Parliamentary Secretary for Western Sydney	26 April 2023	Incumbent	3 years, 109 days	Campbelltown
	Trish Doyle MP	Parliamentary Secretary for Climate Change; Parliamentary Secretary for Energy; Parliamentary Secretary for the Environment; Parliamentary Secretary for Heritage	26 April 2023	Incumbent	3 years, 109 days	Blue Mountains
	Hugh McDermott MP	Parliamentary Secretary to the Attorney General	26 April 2023	Incumbent	3 years, 109 days	Prospect
	David Mehan MP	Parliamentary Secretary to the Treasurer	26 April 2023	Incumbent	3 years, 109 days	The Entrance
	Michael Holland MP	Parliamentary Secretary for Health; Parliamentary Secretary for Regional Health	26 April 2023	Incumbent	3 years, 109 days	Bega
	Marjorie O'Neill MP	Parliamentary Secretary for Transport	26 April 2023	Incumbent	3 years, 109 days	Coogee
	Stephen Bali MP	Parliamentary Secretary for Planning and Public Spaces	26 April 2023	Incumbent	3 years, 109 days	Blacktown
	Mark Buttigieg MLC	Parliamentary Secretary for Industrial Relations; Parliamentary Secretary for Work Health and Safety; Parliamentary Secretary for Multiculturalism	26 April 2023	Incumbent	3 years, 109 days	Legislative Council
	Edmond Atalla MP	Parliamentary Secretary for Police and Counter-terrorism	26 April 2023	Incumbent	3 years, 109 days	Mount Druitt
	Liesl Tesch MP	Parliamentary Secretary for Families and Communities; Parliamentary Secretary for Disability Inclusion	26 April 2023	Incumbent	3 years, 109 days	Gosford
	Anna Watson MP	Parliamentary Secretary for Roads; Parliamentary Secretary for Regional Transport and Roads	26 April 2023	Incumbent	3 years, 109 days	Shellharbour
	Charishma Kaliyanda MP	Parliamentary Secretary for Customer Service and Digital Government; Parliamentary Secretary for Emergency Services; Parliamentary Secretary for Youth Justice	14 June 2024	Incumbent	2 years, 60 days	Liverpool
	Emily Suvaal MLC	Parliamentary Secretary for Trade and Small Business	17 March 2025	Incumbent	1 year, 149 days	Legislative Council
Former Parliamentary Secretaries
	Anthony D'Adam MLC	Parliamentary Secretary for Customer Service and Digital Government; Parliamentary Secretary for Emergency Services; Parliamentary Secretary for Youth Justice	26 April 2023	16 May 2024	1 year, 20 days	Legislative Council
	Janelle Saffin MP	Parliamentary Secretary for Disaster Recovery	9 August 2023	17 March 2025	1 year, 220 days	Lismore

== Interim composition ==
The interim ministry was sworn in on 28 March 2023. The interim ministry also covered other portfolio responsibilities until the finalised ministry was sworn in.

The interim composition consisted of the following ministers:

Office	Additional interim portfolios	Minister
Premier	None	Chris Minns MP
Deputy Premier; Minister for Education and Early Learning	Skills and TAFE; Tertiary Education; Western Sydney; Youth	Prue Car MP
Minister for the Environment; Minister for Heritage; Vice-President of the Executive Council; Leader of the Government in the Legislative Council	Energy and Climate Change; Natural Resources; Water; Housing and Homelessness; Family and Community Services; Disability Inclusion; Women; Prevention of Domestic Violence and Sexual Assault	Penny Sharpe MLC
Special Minister of State; Minister for Roads; Minister for the Arts; Minister for Music and the Night-time Economy; Deputy Leader of the Government in the Legislative Council	Aboriginal Affairs and Treaty; Emergency Services; Regional NSW; Western NSW; Agriculture; Regional Transport and Roads; Tourism; Multiculturalism; Hunter; North Coast	John Graham MLC
Treasurer; Minister for the Gig Economy	Planning and Public Spaces; Industrial Relations; Work Health and Safety; Finance; Small Business; Industry and Trade; Jobs and Investment	Daniel Mookhey MLC
Minister for Health and Regional Health; Minister for Mental Health; Minister for the Illawarra and South Coast	Police; Counter Terrorism; Corrections; Juvenile Justice; Local Government; Medical Research	Ryan Park MP
Minister for Transport	Infrastructure and Cities; Customer Service; Digital; Better Regulation and Innovation; Hospitality and Racing; Property; Lands; Seniors; Veterans; Sport; Central Coast	Jo Haylen MP
Attorney General	None	Michael Daley MP

== See also ==
- Minns shadow ministry
- Speakman shadow ministry
- Sloane shadow ministry
- Second Perrottet ministry

New South Wales government ministries
Preceded by Second Perrottet ministry	Minns ministry 2023–present	Incumbent
