= Government of New South Wales =

State government in Australia

- State government
- Logo used since 2021

Overview
- Established: 6 June 1856; 170 years ago as a responsible colonial government; 1 January 1901; 125 years ago as an Australian state
- State: New South Wales
- Country: Australia
- Leader: Premier (Chris Minns)
- Appointed by: Governor (Margaret Beazley) on behalf of the Monarch (Charles III)
- Main organ: Executive Council of New South Wales (de jure); Cabinet of New South Wales (de facto)
- Ministries: 11 departments
- Responsible to: Parliament of New South Wales
- Annual budget: $120.2 billion
- Headquarters: Sydney
- Website: nsw.gov.au

The government of New South Wales, also known as the NSW Government, is the executive state government of New South Wales, Australia. The government comprises 11 portfolios, led by ministerial departments and supported by several agencies. There are also a number of independent statutory bodies that fall under a portfolio but remain at arm's length for political reasons, such as the Independent Commission Against Corruption and the Electoral Commission. The Executive Council, which consists of the governor and senior ministers, exercises executive authority through the relevant ministerial portfolios.

The current government is held by the New South Wales Labor Party, led by Premier Chris Minns. Minns succeeded Dominic Perrottet of the Liberal Party on 28 March 2023 following that year's state election.

== Ministries ==
The following individuals serve as government ministers, appointed by the Governor, on behalf of the Monarch, and at the recommendation of the Premier. The full ministry was announced on 4 April 2023 and was sworn in the following day on 5 April. All ministers are members of the ruling Labor Party, while all shadow ministers are members of the opposition in parliament.

=== Current composition ===
Portrait	Minister	Portfolio	Took office	Left office	Duration of tenure	Electorate
	Chris Minns MP	Premier	28 March 2023	Incumbent	3 years, 207 days	Kogarah
	Prue Car MP	Deputy Premier; Minister for Education and Early Learning	28 March 2023	Incumbent	3 years, 207 days	Londonderry
	Prue Car MP	Minister for Western Sydney	5 April 2023	Incumbent	3 years, 199 days	Londonderry
	Prue Car MP	Minister for Skills, TAFE and Tertiary Education	3 August 2023	28 September 2023	56 days	Londonderry
	Penny Sharpe MLC	Leader of the Government in the Legislative Council; Minister for the Environment; Minister for Heritage	28 March 2023	Incumbent	3 years, 207 days	Legislative Council
	Penny Sharpe MLC	Minister for Climate Change; Minister for Energy	6 April 2023	Incumbent	3 years, 198 days	Legislative Council
	John Graham MLC	Deputy Leader of the Government in the Legislative Council; Special Minister of State; Minister for the Arts; Minister for Music and the Night-time Economy	28 March 2023	Incumbent	3 years, 207 days	Legislative Council
	John Graham MLC	Minister for Roads	28 March 2023	17 March 2025	1 year, 354 days	Legislative Council
	John Graham MLC	Minister for Jobs and Tourism	6 April 2023	17 March 2025	1 year, 345 days	Legislative Council
	John Graham MLC	Minister for Transport	6 February 2025	Incumbent	1 year, 257 days	Legislative Council
	Daniel Mookhey MLC	Treasurer	28 March 2023	Incumbent	3 years, 207 days	Legislative Council
	Ryan Park MP	Minister for Health; Minister for Regional Health; Minister for the Illawarra and South Coast	28 March 2023	Incumbent	3 years, 207 days	Keira
	Paul Scully MP	Minister for Planning and Public Spaces	5 April 2023	Incumbent	3 years, 199 days	Wollongong
	Sophie Cotsis MP	Minister for Industrial Relations; Minister for Work Health and Safety	5 April 2023	Incumbent	3 years, 199 days	Canterbury
	Yasmin Catley MP	Minister for Police and Counter-terrorism	5 April 2023	Incumbent	3 years, 199 days	Swansea
	Yasmin Catley MP	Minister for the Hunter	3 August 2023	Incumbent	3 years, 79 days	Swansea
	Jihad Dib MP	Minister for Customer Service and Digital Government; Minister for Emergency Services; Minister for Youth Justice	5 April 2023	Incumbent	3 years, 199 days	Bankstown
	Kate Washington MP	Minister for Families and Communities; Minister for Disability Inclusion	5 April 2023	Incumbent	3 years, 199 days	Port Stephens
	Michael Daley MP	Attorney General	28 March 2023	Incumbent	3 years, 207 days	Maroubra
	Tara Moriarty MLC	Minister for Agriculture; Minister for Regional New South Wales; Minister for Western New South Wales	5 April 2023	Incumbent	3 years, 199 days	Legislative Council
	Ron Hoenig MP	Leader of the House; Vice-President of the Executive Council; Minister for Local Government	5 April 2023	Incumbent	3 years, 199 days	Heffron
	Courtney Houssos MLC	Minister for Finance; Minister for Natural Resources	5 April 2023	Incumbent	3 years, 199 days	Legislative Council
	Courtney Houssos MLC	Minister for Domestic Manufacturing and Government Procurement	28 September 2023	Incumbent	3 years, 23 days	Legislative Council
	Steve Kamper MP	Minister for Lands and Property; Minister for Multiculturalism; Minister for Sport	5 April 2023	Incumbent	3 years, 199 days	Rockdale
	Steve Kamper MP	Minister for Small Business	5 April 2023	17 March 2025	1 year, 346 days	Rockdale
	Steve Kamper MP	Minister for Jobs and Tourism	17 March 2025	Incumbent	1 year, 218 days	Rockdale
	Rose Jackson MLC	Minister for Water; Minister for Housing; Minister for Homelessness; Minister for Mental Health; Minister for Youth	5 April 2023	Incumbent	3 years, 199 days	Legislative Council
	Rose Jackson MLC	Minister for the North Coast	5 April 2023	17 March 2025	1 year, 346 days	Legislative Council
	Anoulack Chanthivong MP	Minister for Better Regulation and Fair Trading; Minister for Industry and Trade; Minister for Innovation, Science and Technology; Minister for Building; Minister for Corrections	5 April 2023	Incumbent	3 years, 199 days	Macquarie Fields
	David Harris MP	Minister for Aboriginal Affairs and Treaty; Minister for Gaming and Racing; Minister for Veterans; Minister for Medical Research; Minister for the Central Coast	5 April 2023	Incumbent	3 years, 199 days	Wyong
	Jodie Harrison MP	Minister for Women; Minister for Seniors; Minister for the Prevention of Domestic Violence and Sexual Assault	5 April 2023	Incumbent	3 years, 199 days	Charlestown
	Jenny Aitchison MP	Minister for Regional Transport and Roads	5 April 2023	17 March 2025	1 year, 346 days	Maitland
	Jenny Aitchison MP	Minister for Roads; Minister for Regional Transport	17 March 2025	Incumbent	1 year, 218 days	Maitland
	Steve Whan MP	Minister for Skills, TAFE and Tertiary Education	28 September 2023	Incumbent	3 years, 23 days	Monaro
	Janelle Saffin MP	Minister for Recovery; Minister for Small Business; Minister for the North Coast	17 March 2025	Incumbent	1 year, 218 days	Lismore
Former Ministers
	Tim Crakanthorp MP	Minister for Skills, TAFE and Tertiary Education; Minister for the Hunter	5 April 2023	3 August 2023	120 days	Newcastle
	Jo Haylen	Minister for Transport	28 March 2023	6 February 2025	1 year, 315 days	Summer Hill

== See also ==
- Politics of New South Wales
- List of New South Wales government agencies
- Local government areas of New South Wales
- New South Wales Ministry
- New South Wales Shadow Ministry
- Public Service Association of NSW
