= Minns shadow ministry =

New South Wales opposition arrangements

The shadow ministry of Chris Minns was the NSW Labor shadow cabinet from 2021 to 2023. It opposed the Berejiklian and Perrottet governments in the Parliament of New South Wales. It was led by Chris Minns following his election as leader of the party and NSW Leader of the Opposition on 4 June 2021. Other leadership positions including the deputy party leader, leader and deputy leader of the opposition in the Legislative Council were confirmed on 8 June 2021. The rest of the shadow ministry was subsequently announced by Minns on 11 June 2021, effective the following day.

Following the 2023 election, Minns became Premier, forming the Minns ministry.

== Shadow cabinet ==
Officeholder	Office(s)	Image
Chris Minns MP	Leader of the Opposition	
Prue Car MP	Deputy Leader of the Opposition; Shadow Minister for Education and Early Childhood Learning	
Penny Sharpe MLC	Leader of the Opposition in the Legislative Council; Shadow Minister for the Environment; Shadow Minister for Heritage (2022-2023)	
John Graham MLC	Deputy Leader of the Opposition in the Legislative Council; Shadow Special Minister of State; Shadow Minister for Roads; Shadow Minister for the Night-Time Economy; Shadow Minister for Music; Shadow Minister for Arts (2022-2023); Shadow Minister for the North Coast (2022-2023)	
Daniel Mookhey MLC	Shadow Treasurer; Shadow Minister for the Gig Economy	
Ryan Park MP	Shadow Minister for Health; Shadow Minister for Mental Health; Shadow Minister for the Illawarra and South Coast	
Jo Haylen MP	Shadow Minister for Transport	
Walt Secord MLC	Shadow Minister for Arts and Heritage (2021-2022); Shadow Minister for Police (2021-2022); Shadow Minister for Counter-Terrorism (2021-2022); Shadow Minister for the North Coast (2021-2022)	
Paul Scully MP	Shadow Minister for Planning and Public Spaces; Shadow Minister for Police (2022-2023); Shadow Minister for Counter-Terrorism (2022-2023)	
Sophie Cotsis MP	Shadow Minister for Industrial Relations; Shadow Minister for Work Health and Safety	
Michael Daley MP	Shadow Attorney-General	
Mick Veitch MLC	Shadow Minister for Agriculture; Shadow Minister for Regional New South Wales; Shadow Minister for Western New South Wales	
Yasmin Catley MP	Shadow Minister for Customer Service; Shadow Minister for Digital; Shadow Minister for the Hunter	
Kate Washington MP	Shadow Minister for Family and Community Services; Shadow Minister for Disability Inclusion	
Jihad Dib MP	Shadow Minister for Emergency Services; Shadow Minister for Energy and Climate Change	
Tara Moriarty MLC	Shadow Minister for Corrections and Juvenile Justice; Shadow Minister for Medical Research	
David Harris MP	Shadow Minister for Aboriginal Affairs and Treaty; Shadow Minister for Jobs, Investment and Tourism; Shadow Minister for the Central Coast	
Jenny Aitchison MP	Shadow Minister for Regional Transport and Roads	
Julia Finn MP	Shadow Minister for Sport; Shadow Minister for Youth	
Jodie Harrison MP	Shadow Minister for Women; Shadow Minister for Seniors; Shadow Minister for Prevention of Domestic Violence and Sexual Assault	
Greg Warren MP	Shadow Minister for Local Government; Shadow Minister for Veterans; Shadow Minister for Western Sydney	
Anoulack Chanthivong MP	Shadow Minister for Finance, Industry and Trade	
Steve Kamper MP	Shadow Minister for Small Business, Property and Multiculturalism	
Tania Mihailuk MP	Shadow Minister for Natural Resources (2021–2022)	
Rose Jackson MLC	Shadow Minister for Water; Shadow Minister for Housing and Homelessness	
Courtney Houssos MLC	Shadow Minister for Better Regulation and Innovation; Shadow Minister for Natural Resources(2022-2023)	
Tim Crakanthorp MP	Shadow Minister for Skills, TAFE and Tertiary Education	

== Other Positions ==
Other Positions
Officeholder	Office(s)
Ron Hoenig MP	Manager of Opposition Business
Anna Watson MP	Opposition Whip in the Legislative Assembly (since 2 July 2019)
David Mehan MP	Deputy Opposition Whip in the Legislative Assembly (since 30 July 2019)
Mark Buttigieg MLC	Opposition Whip in the Legislative Council (since 2 July 2019)
Anthony D'Adam MLC	Deputy Opposition Whip in the Legislative Council (since 2 July 2019)

== See also ==
- 2023 New South Wales state election
- Second Berejiklian ministry
- First Perrottet ministry
- Second Perrottet ministry
- Shadow Ministry of Jodi McKay
- Minns ministry
