= Second Perrottet ministry =

99th New South Wales government ministry

- 99th Cabinet of New South Wales

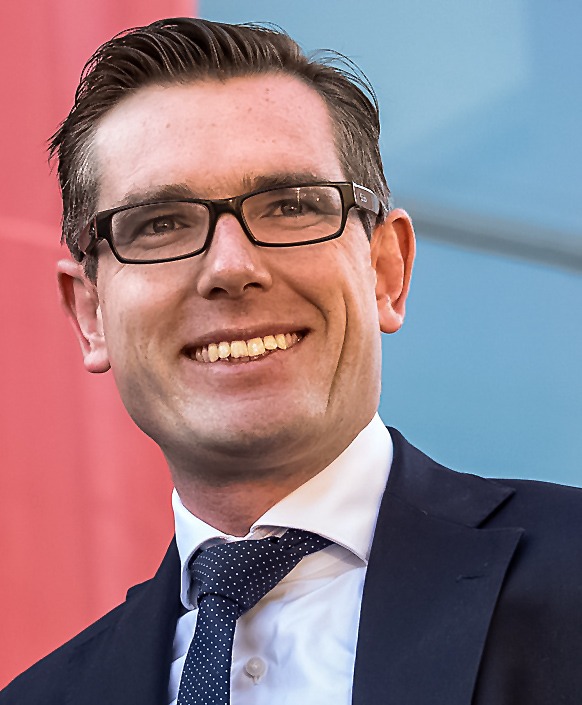
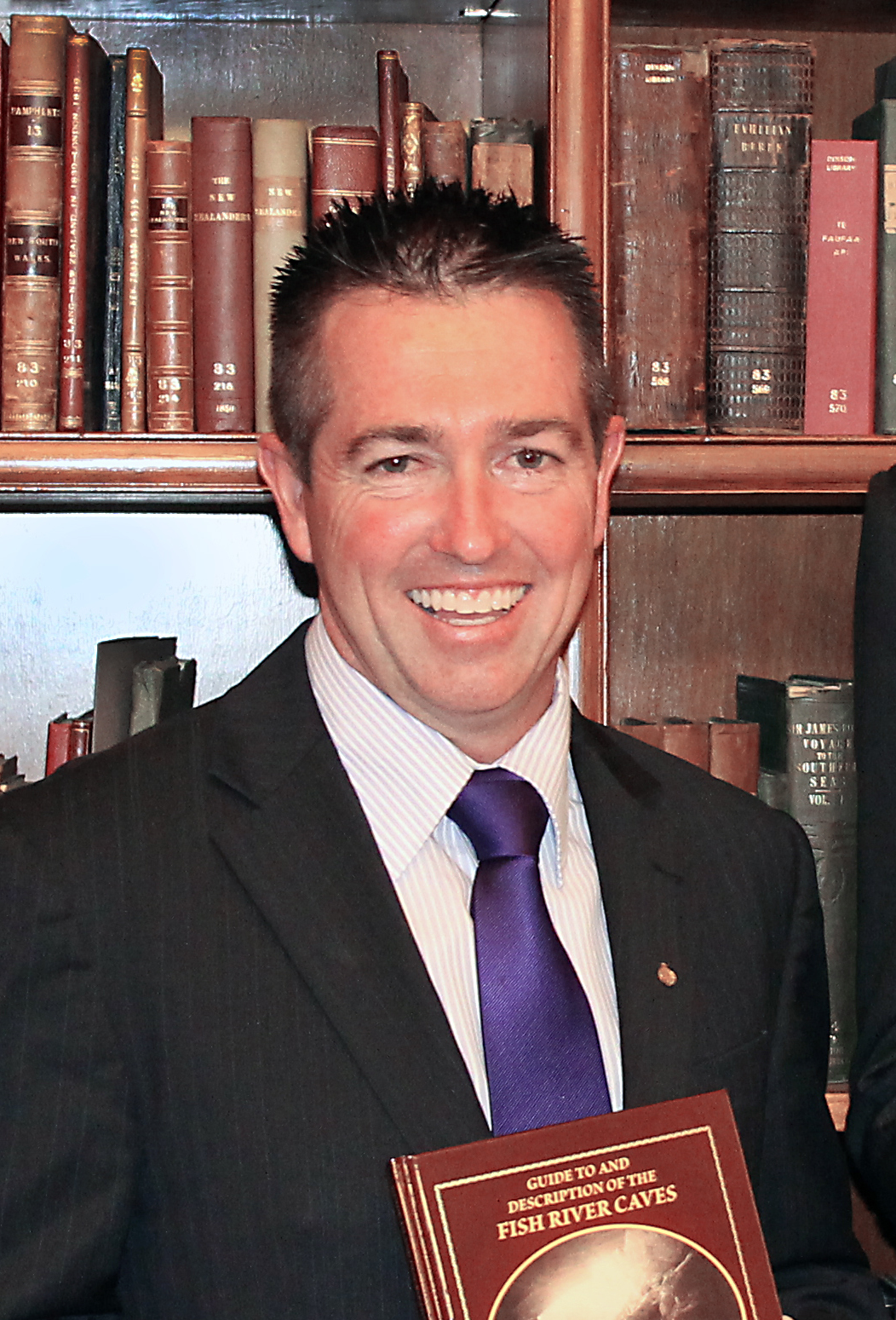
- Dominic Perrottet Paul Toole
- Date formed: 21 December 2021
- Date dissolved: 28 March 2023

People and organisations
- Monarch: Queen Elizabeth II / King Charles III
- Governor: Margaret Beazley
- Premier: Dominic Perrottet
- Deputy Premier: Paul Toole
- Total no. of members: 26
- Member party: Liberal–National Coalition
- Status in legislature: Minority Coalition Government
- Opposition party: Labor
- Opposition leader: Chris Minns

History
- Outgoing election: 2023 state election
- Predecessor: First Perrottet ministry
- Successor: Minns ministry

The Second Perrottet ministry or Second Perrottet–Toole ministry was the 99th ministry of the Government of New South Wales, and was led by Dominic Perrottet, the state's 46th Premier.

The Liberal–National coalition ministry was formed on 21 December 2021 from a reshuffle, the first time since Perrottet and Paul Toole were elected as Liberal Party leader and National Party leader respectively in October 2021. The Parliament of New South Wales considers the reshuffled ministry to be a separate and new ministry from the previous Perrottet ministry before the reshuffle.

The ministry was succeeded by Labor's Minns ministry on 28 March 2023 after the electoral loss of the Coalition in the 2023 state election.

== Composition of ministry ==
The composition of the ministry was announced by Premier Perrottet and sworn in on 21 December 2021. On 18 December 2021, Don Harwin and Shelley Hancock announced that they opted not to be considered in the new ministry for personal reasons. Also that day, Nationals minister Melinda Pavey was notified by Deputy Premier and Nationals leader Toole that she would be dropped from the new ministry. The reshuffle was announced the following day on 19 December 2021 and confirmed that Adam Marshall was also dropped from the ministry. There were nine new ministers appointed to the cabinet and three new portfolios created, which were Cities, Science, Innovation and Technology, and Homes. There were also seven women in the new cabinet, one more than the second Berejiklian ministry. The ministry increased from 21 to 26 ministers. The new cabinet was sworn in on 21 December 2021.

During the New South Wales floods in 2022, on 4 March, Perrottet announced that Minister for Emergency Services and Resilience Steph Cooke would be additionally appointed Minister for Flood Recovery to oversee the flood recovery. As Perrottet and Cooke were in Ballina during the announcement, Cooke could not be sworn in that day and would have to return Sydney first in order to be sworn in. She was eventually sworn in on 9 March 2022.

Eleni Petinos was sacked on 31 July 2022 (Note: Eleni Petinos was officially removed from office on 3 August 2022 over allegations she bullied ministerial staff. Her portfolios were taken over by Victor Dominello.) (but was only officially removed from office on 3 August 2022) and Stuart Ayres resigned four days later. (Note: Stuart Ayres resigned on 3 August 2022 due to his involvement in the appointment of former Deputy Premier John Barilaro as NSW trade commissioner in New York. His portfolios were assigned to Alister Henskens, Ben Franklin and David Elliott.) Victor Dominello took over Petinos' portfolios on 3 August 2022. On 5 August 2022, Alister Henskens was additionally appointed Minister for Enterprise, Investment and Trade, and Minister for Sport, Ben Franklin was additionally appointed Minister for Tourism, and David Elliott was additionally appointed Minister for Western Sydney.

In the order of seniority:

Portfolio	Officeholder	Party	Term start	Term end	Term in office	Image
Premier	Dominic Perrottet	Liberal	21 December 2021	28 March 2023	1 year, 97 days	
Deputy Premier	Paul Toole	National	21 December 2021	28 March 2023	1 year, 97 days	
Minister for Regional New South Wales (Note: Retained portfolios from the first Perrottet ministry.)	Paul Toole	National	21 December 2021	28 March 2023	1 year, 97 days	
Minister for Police	Paul Toole	National	21 December 2021	28 March 2023	1 year, 97 days	
Minister for Enterprise, Investment and Trade	Stuart Ayres	Liberal	21 December 2021	3 August 2022	225 days	
Minister for Enterprise, Investment and Trade	Alister Henskens	Liberal	5 August 2022	28 March 2023	235 days	
Minister for Tourism and Sport	Stuart Ayres	Liberal	21 December 2021	3 August 2022	225 days	
Minister for Sport	Alister Henskens	Liberal	5 August 2022	28 March 2023	235 days	
Minister for Tourism	Ben Franklin MLC	National	5 August 2022	28 March 2023	235 days	
Minister for Western Sydney	Stuart Ayres	Liberal	21 December 2021	3 August 2022	225 days	
Minister for Western Sydney	David Elliott	Liberal	5 August 2022	28 March 2023	235 days	
Minister for Women	Bronnie Taylor MLC	National	21 December 2021	28 March 2023	1 year, 97 days	
Minister for Regional Health	Bronnie Taylor MLC	National	21 December 2021	28 March 2023	1 year, 97 days	
Minister for Mental Health	Bronnie Taylor MLC	National	21 December 2021	28 March 2023	1 year, 97 days	
Treasurer	Matt Kean	Liberal	21 December 2021	28 March 2023	1 year, 97 days	
Minister for Energy	Matt Kean	Liberal	21 December 2021	28 March 2023	1 year, 97 days	
Minister for Finance	Damien Tudehope MLC	Liberal	21 December 2021	28 March 2023	1 year, 97 days	
Minister for Employee Relations	Damien Tudehope MLC	Liberal	21 December 2021	28 March 2023	1 year, 97 days	
Vice-President of the Executive Council; Leader of Government Business in the Legislative Council	Damien Tudehope MLC	Liberal	21 December 2021	28 March 2023	1 year, 97 days	
Minister for Skills and Training	Alister Henskens	Liberal	21 December 2021	28 March 2023	1 year, 97 days	
Minister for Science, Innovation and Technology	Alister Henskens	Liberal	21 December 2021	28 March 2023	1 year, 97 days	
Leader of the House in the Legislative Assembly	Alister Henskens	Liberal	21 December 2021	28 March 2023	1 year, 97 days	
Minister for Health	Brad Hazzard	Liberal	21 December 2021	28 March 2023	1 year, 97 days	
Minister for Education and Early Learning	Sarah Mitchell MLC	National	21 December 2021	28 March 2023	1 year, 97 days	
Attorney General	Mark Speakman SC	Liberal	21 December 2021	28 March 2023	1 year, 97 days	
Minister for Infrastructure	Rob Stokes	Liberal	21 December 2021	28 March 2023	1 year, 97 days	
Minister for Cities	Rob Stokes	Liberal	21 December 2021	28 March 2023	1 year, 97 days	
Minister for Active Transport	Rob Stokes	Liberal	21 December 2021	28 March 2023	1 year, 97 days	
Minister for Customer Service and Digital Government	Victor Dominello	Liberal	21 December 2021	28 March 2023	1 year, 97 days	
Minister for Planning	Anthony Roberts	Liberal	21 December 2021	28 March 2023	1 year, 97 days	
Minister for Homes	Anthony Roberts	Liberal	21 December 2021	28 March 2023	1 year, 97 days	
Minister for Transport	David Elliott	Liberal	21 December 2021	28 March 2023	1 year, 97 days	
Minister for Veterans	David Elliott	Liberal	21 December 2021	28 March 2023	1 year, 97 days	
Minister for Metropolitan Roads	Natalie Ward MLC	Liberal	21 December 2021	28 March 2023	1 year, 97 days	
Minister for Women's Safety and the Prevention of Domestic and Sexual Violence	Natalie Ward MLC	Liberal	21 December 2021	28 March 2023	1 year, 97 days	
Minister for Lands and Water	Kevin Anderson	National	21 December 2021	28 March 2023	1 year, 97 days	
Minister for Hospitality and Racing	Kevin Anderson	National	21 December 2021	28 March 2023	1 year, 97 days	
Minister for Corrections	Geoff Lee	Liberal	21 December 2021	28 March 2023	1 year, 97 days	
Minister for Families and Communities	Natasha Maclaren-Jones MLC	Liberal	21 December 2021	28 March 2023	1 year, 97 days	
Minister for Disability Services	Natasha Maclaren-Jones MLC	Liberal	21 December 2021	28 March 2023	1 year, 97 days	
Minister for Regional Transport and Roads	Sam Farraway MLC	National	21 December 2021	28 March 2023	1 year, 97 days	
Minister for Emergency Services and Resilience	Steph Cooke	National	21 December 2021	28 March 2023	1 year, 97 days	
Minister for Flood Recovery	Steph Cooke	National	9 March 2022	28 March 2023	1 year, 19 days	
Minister for Small Business	Eleni Petinos	Liberal	21 December 2021	3 August 2022	225 days	
Minister for Small Business	Victor Dominello	Liberal	3 August 2022	28 March 2023	237 days	
Minister for Fair Trading	Eleni Petinos	Liberal	21 December 2021	3 August 2022	225 days	
Minister for Fair Trading	Victor Dominello	Liberal	3 August 2022	28 March 2023	237 days	
Minister for Environment and Heritage	James Griffin	Liberal	21 December 2021	28 March 2023	1 year, 97 days	
Minister for Multiculturalism	Mark Coure	Liberal	21 December 2021	28 March 2023	1 year, 97 days	
Minister for Seniors	Mark Coure	Liberal	21 December 2021	28 March 2023	1 year, 97 days	
Minister for Agriculture	Dugald Saunders	National	21 December 2021	28 March 2023	1 year, 97 days	
Minister for Western New South Wales	Dugald Saunders	National	21 December 2021	28 March 2023	1 year, 97 days	
Minister for Aboriginal Affairs	Ben Franklin MLC	National	21 December 2021	28 March 2023	1 year, 97 days	
Minister for the Arts	Ben Franklin MLC	National	21 December 2021	28 March 2023	1 year, 97 days	
Minister for Regional Youth	Ben Franklin MLC	National	21 December 2021	28 March 2023	1 year, 97 days	
Minister for Local Government	Wendy Tuckerman	Liberal	21 December 2021	28 March 2023	1 year, 97 days	

Ministers are members of the Legislative Assembly unless otherwise noted.

== See also ==
- Members of the New South Wales Legislative Assembly, 2019–2023
- Members of the New South Wales Legislative Council, 2019–2023

== Notes and references ==
=== References ===
New South Wales government ministries
Preceded by First Perrottet ministry	Second Perrottet ministry 2021–2023	Succeeded by Minns ministry
