= Deputy Premier of New South Wales =

Australian politician

- Coat of arms of New South Wales

- Flag of New South Wales

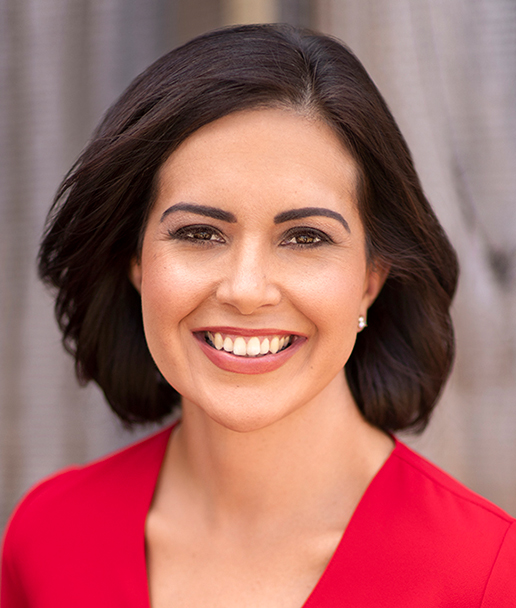
- Incumbent; Prue Car since 28 March 2023
- Premier's Department
- Style: The Honourable
- Member of: Parliament; Cabinet; Executive Council
- Reports to: Premier of New South Wales
- Seat: 52 Martin Place, Sydney
- Nominator: Premier of New South Wales
- Appointer: Governor of New South Wales on the advice of the premier
- Term length: At the governor's pleasure
- Formation: 16 May 1932
- First holder: Sir Michael Bruxner
- Salary: A$343,460

The deputy premier of New South Wales is the second-most senior officer in the Government of New South Wales. The deputy premiership has been a ministerial portfolio since 1932, and the deputy premier is appointed by the governor on the advice of the premier. The current deputy premier is Prue Car, since 28 March 2023, who is also the Minister for Education and Early Learning.

Ultimately, the deputy premier is responsible to the Parliament of New South Wales.

== History ==
The office of Deputy Premier was created in May 1932 for Michael Bruxner, the leader of the Country Party (later renamed the National Party). Prior to that time the term was sometimes used unofficially (without capital letters) for the second-highest ranking minister in the government.

In Labor governments, the deputy premier is the party's deputy leader. Generally speaking, this person has come from the left faction of the party whereas the premier has come from the right faction. In Liberal-National Coalition governments, the position has been held by the Leader of the National Party or its predecessors.

Three deputy premiers have subsequently become Premier in their own right: Joseph Cahill, Robert Heffron, and Jack Renshaw. However, this has not occurred since 1964.

== Duties ==
The duties of the deputy premier are to act on behalf of the premier in his or her absence overseas or on leave. The deputy premier has always been a member of the Cabinet, and has always held at least one substantive portfolio (It would be technically possible for a minister to hold only the portfolio of Deputy Premier, but this has never happened).

If the premier were to die, become incapacitated or resign, the Governor would normally appoint the deputy premier as Premier. If the governing or majority party had not yet elected a new leader, that appointment would be on an interim basis. Should a different leader emerge, that person would then be appointed Premier.

== List of deputy premiers of New South Wales ==
No.	Portrait	Name Electoral district (Birth–death)	Term of office			Portfolio	Party	Premier
No.	Portrait	Name Electoral district (Birth–death)	Term start	Term end	Time in office	Portfolio	Party	Premier
1		Michael Bruxner; MLA for Tenterfield (1882–1970)	16 May 1932	16 May 1941	9 years, 0 days	Minister for Transport; Minister for Local Government (until 1932)	Country	Bertram Stevens; United Australia (1932–1939)
1		Michael Bruxner; MLA for Tenterfield (1882–1970)	16 May 1932	16 May 1941	9 years, 0 days	Minister for Transport; Minister for Local Government (until 1932)	Country	Alexander Mair; United Australia (1939–1941)
2		Jack Baddeley; MLA for Cessnock (1881–1953)	16 May 1941	8 September 1949	8 years, 115 days	Chief Secretary; Secretary for Mines; Minister for National Emergency Services (from 1944); Minister for Labour and Industry and Social Welfare (1947–1948)	Labor	William McKell; Labor (1941–1947)
2		Jack Baddeley; MLA for Cessnock (1881–1953)	16 May 1941	8 September 1949	8 years, 115 days	Chief Secretary; Secretary for Mines; Minister for National Emergency Services (from 1944); Minister for Labour and Industry and Social Welfare (1947–1948)	Labor	Jim McGirr; Labor (1947–1952)
3		Joseph Cahill; MLA for Cook's River (1891–1959)	21 September 1949	2 April 1952	2 years, 194 days	Secretary for Public Works; Minister for Local Government	Labor	Jim McGirr; Labor (1947–1952)
None (2 April 1952–23 February 1953)								Joseph Cahill; Labor (1952–1959)
4		Bob Heffron; MLA for Maroubra (1890–1978)	23 February 1953	28 October 1959	6 years, 247 days	Minister for Education; Secretary for Mines (until 1953)	Labor	Joseph Cahill; Labor (1952–1959)
5		Jack Renshaw; MLA for Castlereagh (1909–1987)	28 October 1959	14 March 1964	4 years, 169 days	Treasurer; Minister for Lands (1960–1961); Minister for Agriculture (1961–1962); Minister for Industrial Development and Decentralisation (from 1962)	Labor	Bob Heffron; Labor (1959–1964)
6		Pat Hills; MLA for Castlereagh (1917–1992)	30 April 1964	13 May 1965	1 year, 13 days	Minister for Highways; Minister for Local Government	Labor	Jack Renshaw; Labor (1964–1965)
7		Sir Charles Cutler; MLA for Orange (1918–2006)	13 May 1965	16 December 1975	10 years, 217 days	Minister for Education (until 1972); Minister for Science (until 1972); Minister for Highways (from 1972); Minister for Local Government (from 1972); Minister for Tourism (from 1975)	Country	Sir Robert Askin; Liberal (1965–1975)
7		Sir Charles Cutler; MLA for Orange (1918–2006)	13 May 1965	16 December 1975	10 years, 217 days	Minister for Education (until 1972); Minister for Science (until 1972); Minister for Highways (from 1972); Minister for Local Government (from 1972); Minister for Tourism (from 1975)	Country	Tom Lewis; Liberal (1975–1976)
8		Leon Punch; MLA for Gloucester (1928–1991)	17 December 1975	14 May 1976	149 days	Minister for Ports; Minister for Public Works	Country	Tom Lewis; Liberal (1975–1976)
8		Leon Punch; MLA for Gloucester (1928–1991)	17 December 1975	14 May 1976	149 days	Minister for Ports; Minister for Public Works	Country	Sir Eric Willis; Liberal (1976)
9		Jack Ferguson; MLA for Merrylands (1924–2002)	14 May 1976	10 February 1984	7 years, 272 days	Minister for Public Works; Minister for Ports; Minister for Housing (1976–1977)	Labor	Neville Wran; Labor (1976–1986)
10		Ron Mulock; MLA for St Marys (1930–2014)	10 February 1984	25 March 1988	4 years, 44 days	Minister for Health (until 1986); Minister for Transport (1986–1987); Attorney General (from 1987)	Labor	Neville Wran; Labor (1976–1986)
10		Ron Mulock; MLA for St Marys (1930–2014)	10 February 1984	25 March 1988	4 years, 44 days	Minister for Health (until 1986); Minister for Transport (1986–1987); Attorney General (from 1987)	Labor	Barrie Unsworth; Labor (1986–1988)
11		Wal Murray; MP for Barwon (1931–2004)	25 March 1988	26 May 1993	5 years, 62 days	Minister for Public Works; Minister for State Development (1988–1990); Minister for Roads (from 1990)	National	Nick Greiner; Liberal (1988–1992)
11		Wal Murray; MP for Barwon (1931–2004)	25 March 1988	26 May 1993	5 years, 62 days	Minister for Public Works; Minister for State Development (1988–1990); Minister for Roads (from 1990)	National	John Fahey; Liberal (1992–1995)
12		Ian Armstrong; MP for Barwon (1937–2020)	26 May 1993	4 April 1995	1 year, 313 days	Minister for Ports; Minister for Public Works	National	John Fahey; Liberal (1992–1995)
13		Andrew Refshauge; MP for Marrickville (born 1949)	4 April 1995	4 August 2005	10 years, 121 days	Minister for Aboriginal Affairs; Minister for Health (until 1999); Minister for Housing (1999–2003); Minister for Urban Affairs and Planning (1999–2001); Minister for Planning (2001–2003); Minister for Education and Training (2003–2005); Minister for State Development (from 2005)	Labor	Bob Carr; Labor (1995–2005)
14		John Watkins; MP for Ryde (born 1955)	10 August 2005	3 September 2008	3 years, 24 days	Minister for Transport; Minister for State Development (until 2006); Minister for Police (2006–2007); Minister for Finance (from 2008)	Labor	Morris Iemma; Labor (2005–2008)
15		Carmel Tebbutt; MP for Marrickville (born 1964)	5 September 2008	26 March 2011	2 years, 202 days	Minister for Commerce (until 2009); Minister for Climate Change and the Environment (until 2009); Minister for Health (from 2009)	Labor	Nathan Rees; Labor (2008–2009)
15		Carmel Tebbutt; MP for Marrickville (born 1964)	5 September 2008	26 March 2011	2 years, 202 days	Minister for Commerce (until 2009); Minister for Climate Change and the Environment (until 2009); Minister for Health (from 2009)	Labor	Kristina Keneally; Labor (2009–2011)
16		Andrew Stoner; MP for Oxley (born 1960)	28 March 2011	16 October 2014	3 years, 202 days	Minister for Trade and Investment; Minister for Regional Infrastructure and Services; Minister for Small Business (from 2014); Minister for the North Coast (from 2014); Minister for Tourism and Major Events (from 2014)	National	Barry O'Farrell; Liberal (2011–2014)
16		Andrew Stoner; MP for Oxley (born 1960)	28 March 2011	16 October 2014	3 years, 202 days	Minister for Trade and Investment; Minister for Regional Infrastructure and Services; Minister for Small Business (from 2014); Minister for the North Coast (from 2014); Minister for Tourism and Major Events (from 2014)	National	Mike Baird; Liberal (2014–2017)
17		Troy Grant; MP for Dubbo (born 1970)	16 October 2014	15 November 2016	2 years, 30 days	Minister for the Arts; Minister for Hospitality, Gaming and Racing (until 2015); Minister for Trade and Investment (until 2015); Minister for Tourism and Major Events (until 2015); Minister for Regional Infrastructure and Services (until 2015); Minister for Racing (from 2015); Minister for Justice and Police (from 2015)	National	Mike Baird; Liberal (2014–2017)
18		John Barilaro; MP for Monaro (born 1971)	15 November 2016	6 October 2021	4 years, 325 days	Minister for Small Business (until 2019); Minister for Skills (until 2019); Minister for Regional Development (until 2017); Minister for Regional New South Wales (2017–2019); Minister for Regional New South Wales, Industry and Trade (from 2019)	National	Mike Baird; Liberal (2014–2017)
18		John Barilaro; MP for Monaro (born 1971)	15 November 2016	6 October 2021	4 years, 325 days	Minister for Small Business (until 2019); Minister for Skills (until 2019); Minister for Regional Development (until 2017); Minister for Regional New South Wales (2017–2019); Minister for Regional New South Wales, Industry and Trade (from 2019)	National	Gladys Berejiklian; Liberal (2017–2021)
19		Paul Toole; MP for Bathurst (born 1970)	6 October 2021	28 March 2023	1 year, 173 days	Minister for Regional New South Wales; Minister for Regional Transport and Roads (until 2021); Minister for Police (from 2021)	National	Dominic Perrottet; Liberal (2021–2023)
20		Prue Car; MP for Londonderry (born 1982 or 1983)	28 March 2023	Incumbent	3 years, 163 days	Minister for Education and Early Learning; Minister for Western Sydney; Minister for Skills, TAFE and Tertiary Education (2023)	Labor	Chris Minns; Labor (since 2023)

== See also ==
- List of New South Wales government agencies
- Leader of the New South Wales National Party
