= Mark Buttigieg =

Australian politician and trade unionist (born 1966)

The Honourable Mark Buttigieg MLC
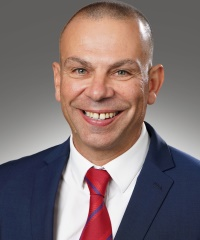

Parliamentary Secretary for Industrial Relations, Work Health and Safety, and Multiculturalism
- Incumbent
- Assumed office 26 April 2023
- Minister: Sophie Cotsis (Industrial Relations, Work Health and Safety); Steve Kamper (Multiculturalism)

Opposition Whip in the New South Wales Legislative Council
- In office 2 July 2019 – 28 March 2023
- Preceded by: Shaoquett Moselmane
- Succeeded by: Chris Rath

Member of the New South Wales Legislative Council
- Incumbent
- Assumed office 23 March 2019

Member of Sutherland Shire Council for C Ward
- In office 13 September 2008 – 7 September 2012
- Preceded by: Scott Docherty
- Succeeded by: Peter Scaysbrook

Personal details
- Born: 11 June 1966 (age 59) Sydney, Australia
- Party: Labor Party
- Spouse: Anna Lignou
- Children: 1 (Gerard)
- Occupation: Trade unionist, electrician
- Website: www.markbuttigieg.com.au

Mark Robert Buttigieg (born 11 June 1966) is an Australian politician and trade unionist, currently serving Parliamentary Secretary for Industrial Relations, Work Health and Safety, and Multiculturalism in the Labor Government of New South Wales. He was elected to the New South Wales Legislative Council at the 2019 New South Wales state election.

== Early life ==
Buttigieg was born in Sydney to Maltese parents who immigrated to Australia in the 1950s. At fifteen, Mark began an electrical apprenticeship with Sydney County Council and later became an electrical systems operator then training manager for Energy Australia. He has a certificate in electrical engineering and an electrical trade certificate. He also holds an arts degree in political science and an economics degree with first-class honours.

== Politics ==
Buttigieg stood for the Labor Party in the Division of Cook at the 2004 and 2007 federal elections. In 2008, he was elected as a councillor on the Sutherland Shire Council, representing C Ward and serving a single term. He did not seek re-election in 2012.

He later moved to Kyeemagh and became Secretary of the Rockdale branch of the Labor Party. He also worked as an organiser for the Electrical Trades Union of Australia (ETU).

In 2015, Buttigieg criticised calls from Kogarah MP, Chris Minns to reduce union influence in the Labor Party. In 2016, Buttigieg sought Labor preselection for the federal seat of Barton. Ultimately, Linda Burney was preselected and won the seat.

He was elected to the New South Wales Legislative Council at the 2019 New South Wales state election. He was appointed Opposition Legislative Council Whip and as Deputy Chair of the Selection of Bills Committee on 2 July 2019. In 2021, he was appointed as Deputy Chair of the Standing Committee on Social Issues. He served in these roles until the 2023 election.

Following the election of the Minns government, Buttigieg was appointed as Parliamentary Secretary for Industrial Relations, Work Health and Safety, and Multiculturalism.

On 19 October 2023, Buttigieg signed an open letter which condemned attacks against Israeli and Palestinian civilians during the Gaza war.
