= Minister for Recovery =

Government minister in New South Wales

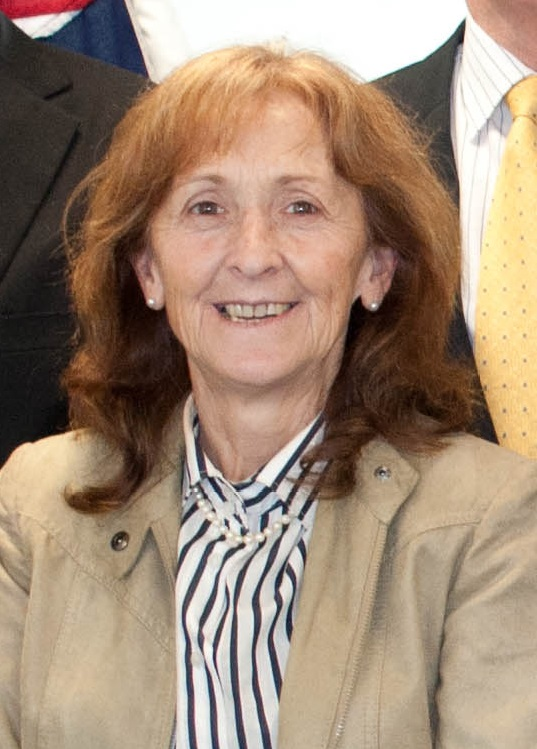
- Incumbent; Janelle Saffin since 17 March 2025
- Premier's Department
- Style: The Honourable
- Appointer: Governor of New South Wales
- Inaugural holder: Steph Cooke (as Minister for Flood Recovery)
- Formation: 9 March 2022

The New South Wales Minister for Recovery is a minister within the Government of New South Wales who has the oversight of natural disaster recovery. The portfolio is administered through the Premier's Department. The current Minister is Janelle Saffin.

== List of ministers ==
The individuals have served as Minister for Recovery, or any precedent titles:

Title	Minister	Party	Ministry	Term start	Term end	Time in office	Notes
Minister for Flood Recovery	Steph Cooke	National	Perrottet (2)	9 March 2022	28 March 2023	1 year, 19 days	
Minister for Recovery	Janelle Saffin	Labor	Minns	17 March 2025	incumbent	1 year, 174 days	

== See also ==
- List of New South Wales government agencies
