= Department of Primary Industries and Regional Development (New South Wales) =

Department of the government of New South Wales

Department overview
- Formed: 2 April 2020
- Preceding Department: Department of Planning, Industry and Environment (Regions, Industry, Agriculture and Resources)
- Type: Department
- Jurisdiction: New South Wales
- Headquarters: 1 Monaro St, Queanbeyan, New South Wales, Australia
- Department executive: Steve Orr, Secretary
- Website: www.nsw.gov.au/regional-nsw

The Department of Primary Industries and Regional Development, previously the Department of Regional NSW, is a department of the New South Wales Government. A central focus for the department is enhancing the liveability of regional and rural communities by strengthening local workforces and attracting key workers, boosting housing, and empowering the diversification of local economies.

The department is a central agency and advises across government on issues affecting the state's regions, which are home to about one-third of the NSW population.

Key responsibilities of the department also include building stronger primary industries, driving local investment and economic development, brokering solutions to strengthen social cohesion, overseeing productive and sustainable land use and natural resources, and delivering local infrastructure and grant programs.

The department was established as the Department of Regional NSW on 2 April 2020 to coordinate support for communities, businesses and farmers hit by the Black Summer bushfires and drought. The department went on to support additional crises including floods and COVID-19, becoming a key voice advocating for local communities within government. It assumed the functions of the Regions, Industry, Agriculture and Resources division from the Department of Planning, Industry and Environment. It also brought together the Department of Primary Industries (which was an agency and not a government department), Local Land Services, Resources and Geoscience and regional coordination across the government. On 1 July 2024, the Department of Primary Industries (the agency) was abolished and merged into the department and the latter was renamed to its current name.

== Structure ==
The department is the lead agency in the Regional NSW cluster, led by the Secretary Steve Orr, who reports to the following ministers:

- Minister for Regional New South Wales
- Minister for Agriculture
- Minister for Western New South Wales

Ultimately the ministers are responsible to the Parliament of New South Wales.

=== Agencies ===
The following agencies are included in the Regional NSW cluster, administered by the Department:

- Department of Primary Industries (until June 2024)
- Forestry Corporation of NSW (state-owned corporation)
- Local Land Services
- Mining, Exploration and Geoscience (MEG)
- Northern Rivers Reconstruction Corporation
- NSW Resources Regulator
- Office of the Cross-Border Commissioner
- Public Works
- Soil Conservation Service

== Office locations ==
Nearly 80 per cent of the department's staff live in the regional communities they serve. In June 2020, it was announced that the department will have four offices, located at Queanbeyan, Armidale, Dubbo and Coffs Harbour. Staff are also based in other regional centres, including Wagga Wagga and Nowra.

== See also ==
- List of New South Wales government agencies
