= Minister for Regional Health =

Government minister in New South Wales, Australia

- Incumbent; Ryan Park since 28 March 2023
- Ministry of Health
- Style: The Honourable
- Appointer: Governor of New South Wales
- Formation: 21 December 2021

The Minister for Regional Health is a minister in the New South Wales Government with responsibility for hospitals and health services in regional New South Wales, Australia.

The inaugural minister was Bronnie Taylor between December 2021 and March 2023. Taylor has stated that her role was created to fix issues in NSW regional hospitals that had been identified by a parliamentary inquiry.

The current minister is Ryan Park, who is also the Minister for Health. Together with the Minister for Mental Health and Minister for Medical Research, they administered the health portfolio through the Health cluster, including the Ministry of Health and a range of other government agencies, including local health districts and the NSW Ambulance service.

In the Minns ministry there are two other ministers with specific regional responsibility:

- Minister for Regional New South Wales, Tara Moriarty
- Minister for Regional Transport and Roads, Jenny Aitchison.

== List of ministers ==
The following individuals have served as Minister for regional health, or any precedent titles:

| Title | Minister | Party | Ministry | Term start | Term end | Time in office | Notes |
|---|---|---|---|---|---|---|---|
| Minister for Regional Health | Bronnie Taylor | National | Perrottet (2) | 21 December 2021 | 28 March 2023 | 1 year, 97 days | |
| Minister for Health and Regional Health | Ryan Park | Labor | Minns | 28 March 2023 | 5 April 2023 | 3 years, 163 days | |
| Minister for Regional Health | Ryan Park | Labor | Minns | 5 April 2023 | incumbent | 3 years, 163 days | |
