= Prue Car =

Australian politician

The Honourable Prue Car MP
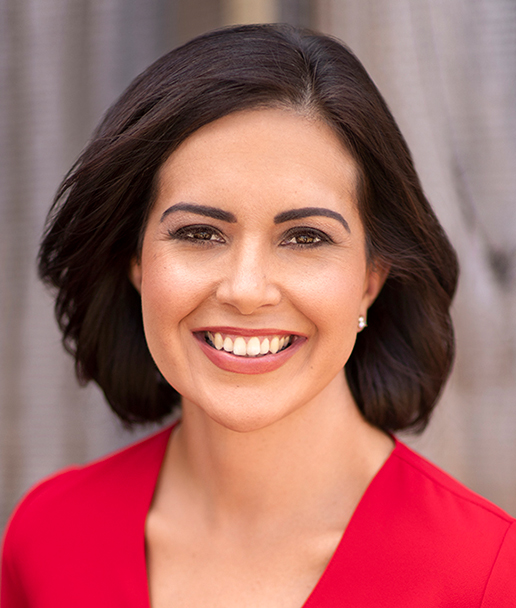
- Official portrait, 2020

20th Deputy Premier of New South Wales
- Incumbent
- Assumed office 28 March 2023
- Premier: Chris Minns
- Preceded by: Paul Toole

Minister for Education and Early Learning
- Incumbent
- Assumed office 28 March 2023
- Premier: Chris Minns
- Preceded by: Sarah Mitchell

Minister for Western Sydney
- Incumbent
- Assumed office 5 April 2023
- Premier: Chris Minns
- Preceded by: David Elliott

Minister for Skills, TAFE and Tertiary Education
- In office 3 August 2023 – 28 September 2023
- Premier: Chris Minns
- Preceded by: Tim Crakanthorp
- Succeeded by: Steve Whan

Deputy Leader of the Opposition in New South Wales
- In office 8 June 2021 – 28 March 2023
- Leader: Chris Minns
- Preceded by: Yasmin Catley
- Succeeded by: Natalie Ward

Deputy Leader of the Labor Party in New South Wales
- Incumbent
- Assumed office 8 June 2021
- Leader: Chris Minns
- Preceded by: Yasmin Catley

Member of the New South Wales Parliament for Londonderry
- Incumbent
- Assumed office 28 March 2015
- Preceded by: Bart Bassett

Personal details
- Born: Prudence Ann Guillaume; 21 October 1982 (age 44) Sydney, New South Wales
- Spouse: Brad Hulls (m. 2023)

Prudence Ann Car (née Guillaume; born 21 October 1982) is an Australian politician who has served as the deputy premier of New South Wales, Minister for Education and Early Learning and Minister for Western Sydney since 2023. She has been a member of the New South Wales Legislative Assembly for Londonderry since 2015.

Car previously served as the deputy leader of the NSW Opposition, Shadow Minister for Education and Shadow Minister for Early Childhood Learning.

== Career ==
Car was a Penrith City Councillor and national communications manager at MS Australia when she was elected. She had previously been an advisor to Premier Bob Carr from 2003 to 2005 and campaign co-ordinator of the Labor Party from 2005 to 2007. She stood unsuccessfully for the state seat of Mulgoa in 2011.

Car was elected to the New South Wales Legislative Assembly as member for Londonderry at the 2015 New South Wales state election. Less than a year later, in 2016, Car was appointed as Shadow Minister for Skills and Shadow Assistant Minister for Education in the Shadow Ministry of Luke Foley. In 2018, she was appointed Shadow Minister for TAFE and Skills and Shadow Minister for Western Sydney in the Shadow Ministry of Michael Daley.

Car was re-elected as member for Londonderry at the 2019 election and was appointed to replace Jihad Dib as Shadow Minister for Education in the Shadow Ministry of Jodi McKay.

On 8 June 2021, Car was elected as deputy leader of the party and deputy leader of the opposition. She retained the Education portfolio and was also appointed as Shadow Minister for Early Childhood Learning in the Shadow Ministry of Chris Minns.

Ten days after Labor's victory at the 2023 New South Wales state election, Car was appointed to the Minns ministry as the Minister for Western Sydney. Also, as the deputy leader of the NSW Labor Party and Shadow Minister for Education, she automatically became both the deputy premier of New South Wales and the Minister for Education and Early Learning immediately following the election. She gained the portfolio of Skills, TAFE and Tertiary Education from Tim Crakanthorp on 8 August 2023 but lost it to Steve Whan on 28 September 2023.

== Personal life ==
Car was born and raised in Western Sydney in New South Wales. She has Indian and French heritage with a grandfather who was French and her father from Durgapur, West Bengal, India. She attended Caroline Chisholm College.

Car is married with one son. In 2022, she took leave from parliament to undergo treatment for kidney cancer.

In June 2025, Car was diagnosed with breast cancer and took a period of leave as minister, continuing to serve as deputy premier. On 1 February 2026, Car announced that she had beaten cancer for the second time and will return to state parliament as education minister.

New South Wales Legislative Assembly
Preceded by Bart Bassett	Member for Londonderry; 2015–present	Incumbent
Political offices
Preceded by Yasmin Catley	Deputy Leader of the Opposition of New South Wales; 2021–2023	Succeeded by Natalie Ward
Preceded by Paul Toole	Deputy Premier of New South Wales; 2023–present	Incumbent
Preceded by Sarah Mitchell	Minister for Education and Early Learning; 2023–present	Incumbent
Preceded by Tim Crakanthorp	Minister for Skills, TAFE and Tertiary Education; 2023	Succeeded by Steve Whan
Party political offices
Preceded by Yasmin Catley	Deputy Leader of the Australian Labor Party (NSW Branch); 2021–present	Incumbent
