= Minister for Veterans (New South Wales) =

Government minister in New South Wales, Australia

- Incumbent; David Harris since 5 April 2023
- Department of Communities and Justice
- Style: The Honourable
- Nominator: Premier of New South Wales
- Appointer: Governor of New South Wales
- Inaugural holder: Graham West (as Minister Assisting the Premier on Veterans Affairs)
- Formation: 23 January 2009

The Minister for Veterans is a minister of the Government of New South Wales with responsibility for veterans' affairs in the state of New South Wales, Australia.

The Minister since 5 April 2023 is David Harris, who also holds the Aboriginal Affairs portfolio.

The Minister assists the Minister for Families, Communities and Disability Inclusion administer her portfolio through the Stronger Communities cluster, in particular through the Department of Communities and Justice and a range of other government agencies.

== List of ministers ==
Ministerial title	Minister	Party	Ministry	Term start	Term end	Time in office	Notes
Minister Assisting the Premier on Veterans Affairs	Graham West	Labor	Rees	23 January 2009	4 December 2009	315 days	
Minister Assisting the Premier on Veterans Affairs	Peter Primrose	Labor	Keneally	4 December 2009	21 May 2010	168 days	
Minister Assisting the Premier on Veterans Affairs	Frank Terenzini	Labor	Keneally	21 May 2010	28 March 2011	311 days	
Minister for Veterans Affairs	Victor Dominello	Liberal	Baird (1)	23 April 2014	28 March 2015	339 days	
Minister for Veterans Affairs	David Elliott	Liberal	Baird (2); Berejiklian (1)	2 April 2015	23 March 2019	3 years, 355 days	
Minister for Sport, Multiculturalism, Seniors and Veterans	John Sidoti	Liberal	Berejiklian (2)	2 April 2019	17 September 2019	168 days	
Minister for Sport, Multiculturalism, Seniors and Veterans	Geoff Lee (acting)	Liberal	Berejiklian (2)	17 September 2019	27 May 2021	1 year, 252 days	
Minister for Sport, Multiculturalism, Seniors and Veterans	Natalie Ward	Liberal	Berejiklian (2); Perrottet (1)	27 May 2021	21 December 2021	208 days	
Minister for Veterans	David Elliott	Liberal	Perrottet (2)	21 December 2021	28 March 2023	1 year, 97 days	
Minister for Veterans	David Harris	Labor	Minns	5 April 2023	incumbent	3 years, 155 days	

== See also ==
- List of New South Wales government agencies
- Minister for Veterans' Affairs (Australia)
  - Minister for Veterans (Victoria)
  - Minister for Veterans (Western Australia)
