= Minister for Western New South Wales =

Government minister in New South Wales, Australia

- Incumbent; Tara Moriarty since 5 April 2023
- Department of Regional NSW
- Style: The Honourable
- Nominator: Premier of New South Wales
- Appointer: Governor of New South Wales
- Inaugural holder: Kevin Humphries
- Formation: 3 April 2011

The Minister for Western New South Wales is a minister in the New South Wales Government with responsibility for the region to the west of the Great Dividing Range in New South Wales, Australia.

It was first established in 2011 in the O'Farrell ministry. It was not responsible for any legislation, nor tasked with the management of a department. It was abolished in the second Baird ministry and the NSW Farmers' Association called for its return in the lead-up to the 2019 election. It was re-created in the second Berejiklian ministry, combined with the portfolio of Agriculture, before returning as a separate portfolio in the second Perrottet ministry.

== List of ministers ==
The following individuals have served as Minister for Western New South Wales, or any precedent titles:

Title	Minister	Party	Ministry	Term start	Term end	Time in office	Notes
Minister for Western New South Wales	Kevin Humphries	National	O'Farrell; Baird (1)	3 April 2011	2 April 2015	3 years, 364 days	
Minister for Agriculture and Western New South Wales	Adam Marshall	National	Berejiklian (2); Perrottet (1)	2 April 2019	21 December 2021	2 years, 263 days	
Minister for Western New South Wales	Dugald Saunders	National	Perrottet (2)	21 December 2021	28 March 2023	1 year, 97 days	
Minister for Western New South Wales	Tara Moriarty	Labor	Minns	5 April 2023	Incumbent	3 years, 155 days	
