= Minister for the Prevention of Domestic Violence and Sexual Assault =

Australian government position

Minister for Prevention of Domestic Violence and Sexual Assault

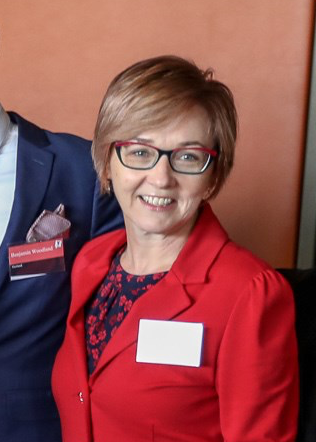
- Incumbent; Jodie Harrison since 5 April 2023
- Department of Communities and Justice
- Style: The Honourable
- Appointer: Governor of New South Wales
- Inaugural holder: Pru Goward
- Formation: 2 April 2015

The Minister for Prevention of Domestic Violence and Sexual Assault, is a minister in the Government of New South Wales who has responsibility for the prevention of domestic violence and sexual assault in New South Wales, Australia.

The reduction in violence against women was one of the objectives in establishing the Minister for the Status of Women in the third Fahey ministry in 1993. A separate portfolio of Prevention of Domestic Violence and Sexual Assault was created in the second Baird ministry. Women's safety was added to the portfolio title in the second Perrottet ministry when Natalie Ward held the portfolio.

With the return of Labor to power at the 2023 election, the portfolio returned to its original title. The current minister, since 5 April 2023, is Jodie Harrison serving in the Minns ministry. The minister supports the Attorney General in the administration of that portfolio through the Department of Communities and Justice and a range of other government agencies. Ultimately, the ministers are responsible to the Parliament of New South Wales.

== List of ministers ==
The following individuals have served as for the Prevention of Domestic Violence and Sexual Assault or any precedent titles:

Title	Minister	Party	Ministry	Term start	Term end	Time in office	Notes
Minister for Prevention of Domestic Violence and Sexual Assault	Pru Goward	Liberal	Berejiklian (1)	2 April 2015	23 March 2019	3 years, 355 days	
Minister for the Prevention of Domestic Violence	Mark Speakman	Liberal	Berejiklian (2)	2 April 2019	27 May 2021	2 years, 263 days	
Minister for Prevention of Domestic and Sexual Violence	Mark Speakman	Liberal	Berejiklian (2); Perrottet (1)	27 May 2021	21 December 2021	2 years, 263 days	
Minister for Women's Safety and the Prevention of Domestic and Sexual Violence	Natalie Ward	Liberal	Perrottet (2)	21 December 2021	28 March 2023	1 year, 97 days	
Minister for the Environment	Penny Sharpe	Labor	Minns	28 March 2023	5 April 2023	8 days	
Minister for the Prevention of Domestic Violence and Sexual Assault	Jodie Harrison	Labor	Minns	5 April 2023	incumbent	3 years, 155 days	

== See also ==
- List of New South Wales government agencies
