= Natalie Ward (politician) =

Australian politician

The Honourable Natalie Ward MLC

Deputy Leader of the NSW Liberal Party
- Incumbent
- Assumed office 8 May 2023
- Leader: Mark Speakman; Kellie Sloane
- Preceded by: Matt Kean

Deputy Leader of the Liberal Party in the Legislative Council
- Incumbent
- Assumed office 21 April 2023
- Leader: Damien Tudehope; Herself (acting)
- Preceded by: Position re-established

Leader of the Opposition in the Legislative Council
- Acting; 6 July 2026 – 7 October 2026
- Leader: Kellie Sloane
- Preceded by: Damien Tudehope
- Succeeded by: Damien Tudehope

Shadow Minister for Transport and Infrastructure
- Incumbent
- Assumed office 6 January 2026
- Leader: Kellie Sloane
- Preceded by: Herself (as Shadow Minister for Transport and Roads and Shadow Minister for Infrastructure)

Shadow Minister for Sport
- Incumbent
- Assumed office 6 January 2026
- Leader: Kellie Sloane
- Preceded by: Eleni Petinos
Previous shadow ministerial positions
Shadow Minister for Transport and Roads Shadow Minister for Infrastructure
In office 9 May 2023 – 6 January 2026
Leader	Mark Speakman; Kellie Sloane
Preceded by	Jo Haylen (as Shadow Minister for Transport); John Graham (as Shadow Minister for Roads)
Succeeded by	Herself (as Shadow Minister for Transport and Infrastructure); Mark Coure (as Shadow Minister for Roads)
Shadow Minister for the Illawarra and South Coast
In office 9 May 2023 – 21 October 2025
Leader	Mark Speakman
Preceded by	Ryan Park
Succeeded by	Chris Rath
Ministerial positions
Minister for Women's Safety and the Prevention of Domestic and Sexual Violence
In office 21 December 2021 – 28 March 2023
Preceded by	Mark Speakman (as Minister for Prevention of Domestic and Sexual Violence)
Succeeded by	Jodie Harrison
Minister for Metropolitan Roads
In office 21 December 2021 – 28 March 2023
Preceded by	Rob Stokes (as Minister for Transport and Roads)
Succeeded by	John Graham
Minister for Sport, Multiculturalism, Seniors and Veterans
In office 27 May 2021 – 21 December 2021
Preceded by	John Sidoti
Succeeded by	Stuart Ayres (as Minister for Tourism and Sport); Mark Coure (as Minister for Multiculturalism and as Minister for Seniors); David Elliott (as Minister for Veterans)
Member of the New South Wales Legislative Council
Incumbent
Assumed office 16 November 2017
Preceded by	Greg Pearce
Succeeded by

Personal details
- Party: Liberal Party
- Spouse: David Begg
- Children: 2
- Profession: Lawyer

Natalie Peta Ward is an Australian politician who is currently the deputy leader of the New South Wales Liberal Party. Ward has been a Liberal member of the New South Wales Legislative Council since 21 November 2017, when she filled a casual vacancy caused by the resignation of The Hon. Greg Pearce. Ward served as the Minister for Sport, Multiculturalism, Seniors and Veterans in the second Berejiklian ministry and the first arrangement of the Perrottet ministry between May and December 2021. She was the Minister for Metropolitan Roads and Minister for Women's Safety and the Prevention of Domestic and Sexual Violence in the second Perrottet ministry, from December 2021 to March 2023.

Ward is a commercial litigation lawyer of 20 years practice in large commercial firms, boutique practice and government regulatory financial services areas. She served on the board of Women Lawyers and is a member of the Rotary Club of Sydney. She is a former director of Australian Rugby Foundation.

Ward was formerly deputy chief of staff to NSW Minister for Finance and Services and Minister for the Illawarra, Greg Pearce. Prior to her appointment to the ministry, Ward served as Parliamentary Secretary to the Attorney General and Chaired the Joint Select Committee on Coercive Control and the Joint Select Committee on Sydney's Night Time Economy.

Her husband, David Begg, is a commercial lawyer and former president of Sydney Rugby Union.

Ward wanted to move to the Legislative Assembly at the 2023 New South Wales state election, but in a preselection contest for the ultra-safe Liberal seat of Davidson, in Sydney’s northern suburbs, she was defeated by Matt Cross, a former staff member for Mike Baird.

After the defeat of the Coalition government at the 2023 state election, Ward was elected deputy leader of the NSW Liberal Party. This is despite the fact that she is a member of the upper house the Legislative Council as the position usually goes to a member of the lower house the Legislative Assembly and therefore necessitating rule changes to allow her to assume the position.

Political offices
Preceded by Rob Stokes as Minister for Transport and Roads	Minister for Metropolitan Roads; 2021–2023	Succeeded by John Graham as Minister for Roads
Preceded by Mark Speakman as Minister for Prevention of Domestic and Sexual Violence	Minister for Women's Safety and the Prevention of Domestic and Sexual Violence; 2021–2023	Succeeded by Jodie Harrison as Minister for the Prevention of Domestic Violence and Sexual Assault
Preceded by John Sidoti	Minister for Sport, Multiculturalism, Seniors and Veterans; 2021	Succeeded by Stuart Ayres as Minister for Tourism and Sport
Preceded by John Sidoti	Minister for Sport, Multiculturalism, Seniors and Veterans; 2021	Succeeded by Mark Coure as Minister for Multiculturalism and as Minister for Seniors
Preceded by John Sidoti	Minister for Sport, Multiculturalism, Seniors and Veterans; 2021	Succeeded by David Elliott as Minister for Minister for Veterans
