= Tara Moriarty =

Member of the New South Wales Legislative Council

The Honourable Tara Moriarty MLC

Minister for Agriculture Minister for Western New South Wales
- Incumbent
- Assumed office 5 April 2023
- Premier: Chris Minns
- Preceded by: Dugald Saunders

Minister for Regional New South Wales
- Incumbent
- Assumed office 5 April 2023
- Premier: Chris Minns
- Preceded by: Paul Toole

Member of the New South Wales Legislative Council
- Incumbent
- Assumed office 23 March 2019
- Preceded by: Ernest Wong

Personal details
- Party: Australian Labor Party

Tara Elizabeth Moriarty is an Australian politician. She has been a member of the New South Wales Legislative Council since 2019, representing the Australian Labor Party.

Moriarty was Chair of Club Plus Superannuation and Secretary/President of the Liquor and Hospitality Division of UV prior to her election. She has been Senior Vice President of NSW Labor and a member of the ALP National Executive.

Upon her election in 2019, Moriarty was immediately appointed to the shadow ministry, serving as the Shadow Minister for Mental Health and Crown Lands. She served in this role until Jodi McKay was replaced as Leader by Chris Minns in 2021.

In 2021, she was appointed Shadow Minister for Corrections, Juvenile Justice and Medical Research in the shadow Ministry of Chris Minns. Following Labor's victory in the 2023 New South Wales state election, Moriarty was appointed Minister for Agriculture, Regional New South Wales and Western New South Wales in the Minns ministry.

New South Wales Legislative Council
Preceded by Ernest Wong	Member of the New South Wales Legislative Council; 2019–present	Incumbent
Political offices
Preceded by Dugald Saunders	Minister for Agriculture and Western New South Wales; 2023–present	Incumbent
Preceded by Paul Toole	Minister for Regional New South Wales; 2023–present	Incumbent
