= Daniel Mookhey =

Australian politician (born 1982)

MLC The Honourable Daniel Mookhey
- नितिन मुखी

67th Treasurer of New South Wales
- Incumbent
- Assumed office 28 March 2023
- Premier: Chris Minns
- Preceded by: Matt Kean

Minister for the Gig Economy
- In office 28 March 2023 – 5 April 2023
- Premier: Chris Minns
- Succeeded by: Sophie Cotsis (as Minister for Industrial Relations)

Member of the New South Wales Legislative Council
- Incumbent
- Assumed office 6 May 2015
- Preceded by: Steve Whan

Personal details
- Born: 1982 (age 43–44) Blacktown, New South Wales, Australia
- Party: Labor
- Spouse: Tamsin Lloyd (m. 2014)
- Education: University of Technology, Sydney; University of New England

Nitin Daniel Mookhey (born 1982) is an Australian politician and current Treasurer of New South Wales. He has been a Labor member of the New South Wales Legislative Council since 6 May 2015.

== Political career ==
Mookhey was appointed to the Legislative Council of New South Wales in 2015 to fill a vacancy caused by Steve Whan's resignation.

After the election of Michael Daley as the Leader of the Opposition in 2018, Mookhey was appointed as opposition cabinet secretary.

In 2019 following the election of Jodi McKay as leader after Labor's defeat in the 2019 New South Wales state election, Mookhey was promoted to the opposition front bench, taking on the roles of Shadow Minister for Finance and Small Business, as well as Shadow Minister for the Gig Economy.

On 11 June 2021, following Chris Minns' election as leader, Mookhey was appointed as the Shadow Treasurer, while retaining the portfolio for the Shadow Minister for the Gig Economy in Minns' Shadow Ministry. He officially assumed the roles of Treasurer and Minister for the Gig Economy on 28 March 2023, after Labor secured victory in the general election held on 25 March 2023.

== Personal life ==
Mookhey was born in Blacktown to Indian migrants from Punjab, India and attended Model Farms High School and Girraween High School.

Mookhey is the first parliamentarian in Australian history to be sworn into office on the Bhagavad Gita.

Political offices
Preceded by Matt Kean	Treasurer of New South Wales; 2023–present	Incumbent
New title	Minister for the Gig Economy; 2023	Succeeded by Sophie Cotsis as Minister for Industrial Relations
