= Minister for Skills, TAFE and Tertiary Education =

Government minister in New South Wales, Australia

- Incumbent; Steve Whan since 28 September 2023
- Department of Education; TAFE NSW
- Style: The Honourable
- Nominator: Premier of New South Wales
- Appointer: Governor of New South Wales
- Inaugural holder: John Fahey (as the Minister for Further Education, Training and Employment)
- Formation: 24 July 1990

The New South Wales Minister for Skills, TAFE and Tertiary Education is a minister in the New South Wales Government and has responsibilities that includes all schools and institutes of higher education in New South Wales, Australia.

The current minister, since 28 September 2023, is Steve Whan. The minister supports the Minister for Education and Early Learning, Prue Car.

Together, the ministers administer the portfolio through the Education cluster, in particular the Department of Education, TAFE NSW, and a range of other government agencies.

Ultimately, the ministers are responsible to the Parliament of New South Wales.

== List of ministers ==
The following individuals have been appointed as the Minister for Skills and Training or any preceding titles:

Title	Minister	Party	Ministry	Term start	Term end	Time in office	Notes
Minister for Further Education, Training and Employment	John Fahey	Liberal	Grieiner (1) (2); Fahey (1)	24 July 1990	3 July 1992	1 year, 345 days	
Minister for Employment and Training	Virginia Chadwick	Liberal	Fahey (2)	3 July 1992	26 May 1993	2 years, 275 days	
Minister for Education, Training and Youth Affairs	Virginia Chadwick	Liberal	Fahey (3)	26 May 1993	4 April 1995	2 years, 275 days	
Minister for Education and Training	John Aquilina	Labor	Carr (1) (2) (3)	4 April 1995	21 November 2001	6 years, 231 days	
Minister for Education and Training	John Watkins	Labor	Carr (3)	21 November 2001	2 April 2003	1 year, 132 days	
Minister for Education and Training	Andrew Refshauge	Labor	Carr (4)	2 April 2003	21 January 2005	1 year, 294 days	
Minister for Education and Training	Carmel Tebbutt	Labor	Carr (4); Iemma (1)	21 January 2005	2 April 2007	2 years, 71 days	
Minister for Education and Training	John Della Bosca	Labor	Iemma (2)	2 April 2007	8 September 2008	1 year, 159 days	
Minister for Education and Training	Verity Firth	Labor	Rees; Keneally	8 September 2008	28 March 2011	2 years, 201 days	
Minister for Skills	John Barilaro	National	Baird (2); Berejiklian (1)	2 April 2015	23 March 2019	3 years, 355 days	
Minister for Skills and Tertiary Education	Geoff Lee	Liberal	Berejiklian (2); Perrottet (1)	2 April 2019	21 December 2021	2 years, 263 days	
Minister for Skills and Training	Alister Henskens	Liberal	Perrottet (2)	21 December 2021	28 March 2023	1 year, 97 days	
Minister for Education and Early Learning	Prue Car	Labor	Minns	28 March 2023	5 April 2023	8 days	
Minister for Skills, TAFE and Tertiary Education	Tim Crakanthorp	Labor	Minns	5 April 2023	3 August 2023	120 days	
Minister for Skills, TAFE and Tertiary Education	Prue Car	Labor	Minns	3 August 2023	28 September 2023	56 days	
Minister for Skills, TAFE and Tertiary Education	Steve Whan	Labor	Minns	28 September 2023	incumbent	2 years, 344 days	

== Assistant Ministers ==
Ministerial title	Minister	Party	Ministry	Term start	Term end	Time in office
Assistant Minister for Skills	Adam Marshall	National	Berejiklian (2)	30 January 2017	23 March 2019	2 years, 52 days

== See also ==
- List of New South Wales government agencies
