= Minister for Heritage (New South Wales) =

New South Wales political position

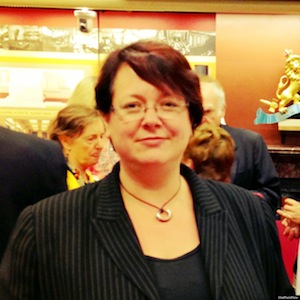
- Incumbent; Penny Sharpe since 28 March 2023
- Department of Climate Change, Energy, the Environment and Water
- Style: The Honourable
- Appointer: Governor of New South Wales

The New South Wales minister for heritage is currently The Hon. Penny Sharpe MLC since March 2023. The actual title of minister for heritage was revived in 2021 having previously only been used for two separate periods, 1986-1988 and 2011-2019.

The NSW Heritage Act was introduced in 1977, along with the creation of the Heritage Council which informs its administration. The purpose of the act is to encourage the conservation of the State’s heritage, identify and protect items of significance, and to assist owners with the conservation of items of significance. The act is currently up for review, as it seen by the current administration as burdened by "costly regulatory obstacles".

== Minister for Heritage ==
The following individuals have been appointed minister responsible for administering the NSW Heritage Act 1977, including ministers whose title does not have the word "heritage".

Minister	Party affiliation	Ministerial title	Term start	Term end	Time in office	Notes
Paul Landa	Labor	Minister for Planning and Environment	21 December 1977	29 February 1980	2 years, 70 days	
Eric Bedford	Labor	Minister for Planning and Environment	29 February 1980	10 February 1984	3 years, 347 days	
Terry Sheahan	Labor	Minister for Planning and Environment	10 February 1984	12 December 1984	306 days	
Bob Carr	Labor	Minister for Planning and Environment	12 December 1984	4 July 1986	3 years, 100 days	
Bob Carr	Labor	Minister for Heritage	4 July 1986	21 March 1988	3 years, 100 days	
David Hay	Liberal	Minister for Planning	21 March 1988	3 May 1991	3 years, 43 days	
Robert Webster	National	Minister for Planning	6 June 1991	4 April 1995	3 years, 336 days	
Craig Knowles	Labor	Minister for Urban Affairs and Planning	4 April 1995	8 April 1999	4 years, 4 days	
Andrew Refshauge	Labor	Minister for Urban Affairs and Planning	8 April 1999	2 April 2003	3 years, 359 days	
Diane Beamer	Labor	Minister Assisting the Minister for Infrastructure and Planning (Planning Administration)	2 April 2003	3 August 2005	2 years, 123 days	
Frank Sartor	Labor	Minister for Planning	3 August 2005	5 September 2008	3 years, 33 days	
Kristina Keneally	Labor	Minister for Planning	8 September 2008	4 December 2009	1 year, 90 days	
Tony Kelly	Labor	Minister for Planning	8 December 2009	28 March 2011	1 year, 114 days	
Robyn Parker	Liberal	Minister for Heritage	3 April 2011	23 April 2014	3 years, 20 days	
Rob Stokes	Liberal	Minister for Heritage	23 April 2014	2 April 2015	344 days	
Mark Speakman	Liberal	Minister for Heritage	2 April 2015	30 January 2017	1 year, 303 days	
Gabrielle Upton	Liberal	Minister for Heritage	30 January 2017	23 March 2019	2 years, 52 days	
Don Harwin	Liberal	Special Minister of State	23 March 2019	21 December 2021	2 years, 273 days	
James Griffin	Liberal	Minister for Environment and Heritage	21 December 2021	28 March 2023	1 year, 97 days	
Penny Sharpe	Labor	Minister for Heritage	28 March 2023	incumbent	3 years, 163 days	
