= Minister for Education and Early Learning =

Government minister in New South Wales, Australia

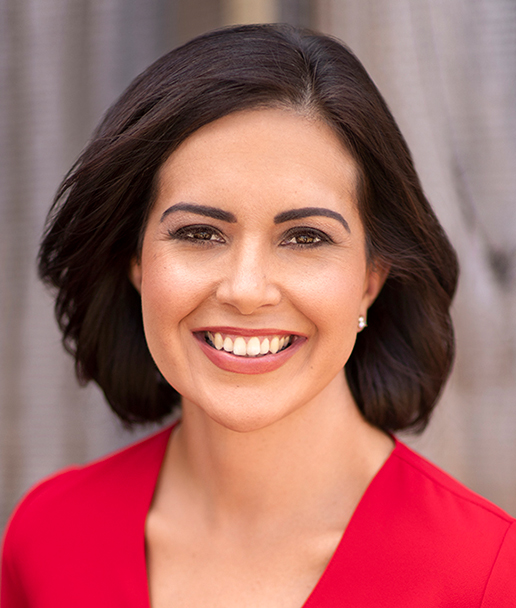
- Incumbent; Prue Car since 28 March 2023
- Department of Education
- Style: The Honourable
- Nominator: Premier of New South Wales
- Appointer: Governor of New South Wales
- Precursor: Minister of Justice and Public Instruction
- Inaugural holder: Sir John Robertson as Minister of Public Instruction
- Formation: 1 May 1880
- Website: Department of Education

The New South Wales Minister for Education and Early Learning is a minister in the New South Wales Government and has responsibilities that includes all schools and institutes of higher education in New South Wales, Australia.

Together, the ministers administer the portfolio through the Education cluster, in particular the Department of Education, TAFE NSW, and a range of other government agencies.

Ultimately, the ministers are responsible to the Parliament of New South Wales.

== Office history ==
The role of administering the education system in New South Wales began with the passing by the New South Wales Legislative Council of the National Education Board Act 1848, which emulated the 'National' system of education established in Ireland by Lord Stanley in 1831 through the Stanley letter. The Act established the Board of National Education, a body corporate, with a Chairman of the Board appointed by the board members. The Board was abolished by the colonial government of Henry Parkes in 1866 with the passing of the Public Schools Act 1866 and its functions were replaced by the Council of Education.

Originally the bill for the act had included a measure to attach the role of President of the Council of Education ex officio to the Colonial Secretary. This measure was deleted in committee stage and the role of President was to be elected by the members of the council. This came to be seen by the first president, Parkes, as an indispensable way in which to protect the independence of the fledgling education system in the colony. From 1873, with the independence of the role of President well established, the responsibility for education within the Parliament was held by the Minister of Justice and Public Instruction.

However this situation did not last and the independent council was abolished with the passing of the Public Instruction Act 1880 by Sir Henry Parkes' third government. The Act dissolved the Council of Education and transferred its responsibilities to a new Minister of Public Instruction, who had the role of establishing for the first time a well-structured system of public education throughout the colony. The Minister administered the portfolio through the Department of Public Instruction, which became the Department of Education in 1915. In 2015 the functions of TAFE NSW were transferred from the education portfolio to the industry, portfolio only to return to the education portfolio in 2019.

== Predecessor offices and ministers ==
=== Board of National Education/Council of Education ===
The Chairman or President were not ministers of the crown, although all but John Smith were current or former members of parliament. They were independent of ministerial supervision until the Minister of Justice and Public Instruction was appointed in December 1873.

Office	Office-holder	Term start	Term end	Time in office
Chairman of the Board of National Education	John Plunkett	15 July 1848	1 February 1858	9 years, 201 days
Chairman of the Board of National Education	Sir Charles Nicholson	1 February 1858	31 December 1858	333 days
Chairman of the Board of National Education	George Holden	1 January 1859	31 December 1859	364 days
Chairman of the Board of National Education	Sir Charles Nicholson	1 January 1860	31 December 1860	365 days
Chairman of the Board of National Education	George Holden	1 January 1861	31 December 1866	5 years, 364 days
President of the Council of Education	Henry Parkes	1 January 1867	14 October 1870	3 years, 286 days
President of the Council of Education	John Smith	14 October 1870	14 July 1871	273 days
President of the Council of Education	George Allen	14 July 1871	1 January 1872	171 days
President of the Council of Education	John Smith	1 January 1872	30 April 1880	8 years, 120 days

=== Ministers of Justice and Public Instruction ===
Title	Minister	Term start	Term end	Time in office	Notes
Minister of Justice and Public Instruction	George Allen MLA	9 December 1873	8 February 1875	1 year, 61 days	
Minister of Justice and Public Instruction	Joseph Docker MLC	9 February 1875	21 March 1877	2 years, 40 days	
Minister of Justice and Public Instruction	Francis Suttor MLA	22 March 1877	16 August 1877	147 days	
Minister of Justice and Public Instruction	John Lackey MLA	17 August 1877	17 December 1877	122 days	
Minister of Justice and Public Instruction	Joseph Leary MLA	18 December 1877	20 December 1878	1 year, 2 days	
Minister of Justice and Public Instruction	Francis Suttor	21 December 1878	30 April 1880	1 year, 131 days	

== List of ministers ==
The following individuals have been appointed Minister for Education and Early Childhood Learning or any previous titles.

=== Education ===
Minister	Party	Title	Term start	Term end	Time in office	Notes
Sir John Robertson	None	Minister of Public Instruction	1 May 1880	10 November 1881	101 days	
Francis Suttor	None	Minister of Public Instruction	14 November 1881	4 January 1883	1 year, 51 days	
George Reid	None	Minister of Public Instruction	5 January 1883	6 March 1884	1 year, 61 days	
William Trickett	None	Minister of Public Instruction	2 May 1884	21 December 1885	1 year, 233 days	
James Young	None	Minister of Public Instruction	22 December 1885	25 February 1886	65 days	
Arthur Renwick	None	Minister of Public Instruction	26 February 1886	19 January 1887	327 days	
James Inglis	Free Trade	Minister of Public Instruction	20 January 1887	16 January 1889	1 year, 362 days	
Francis Suttor	Protectionist	Minister of Public Instruction	17 January 1889	7 March 1889	49 days	
Joseph Carruthers	Free Trade	Minister of Public Instruction	8 March 1889	22 October 1891	2 years, 228 days	
Francis Suttor	Protectionist	Minister of Public Instruction	23 October 1891	2 August 1894	2 years, 283 days	
Jacob Garrard	Free Trade	Minister of Public Instruction	3 August 1894	15 August 1898	4 years, 12 days	
James Hogue	Free Trade	Minister of Public Instruction	27 August 1898	13 September 1899	1 year, 17 days	
John Perry	Protectionist / Progressive	Minister of Public Instruction	14 September 1899	14 June 1904	4 years, 274 days	
John Fegan	Free Trade	Minister of Public Instruction	15 June 1904	29 August 1904	75 days	
Broughton O'Conor	Liberal Reform	Minister of Public Instruction	30 August 1904	13 May 1907	2 years, 256 days	
James Hogue	Liberal Reform	Minister of Public Instruction	14 May 1907	20 October 1910	3 years, 159 days	
George Beeby	Labor	Minister of Public Instruction	21 October 1910	10 September 1911	324 days	
Campbell Carmichael	Labor	Minister of Public Instruction	11 September 1911	26 November 1911	76 days	
Frederick Flowers	Labor	Minister of Public Instruction	27 November 1911	29 February 1912	94 days	
Campbell Carmichael	Labor	Minister of Public Instruction	1 March 1912	5 March 1915	3 years, 4 days	
William Holman	Labor	Minister of Public Instruction	6 March 1915	15 March 1915	9 days	
Arthur Griffith	Labor	Minister of Public Instruction	15 March 1915	7 November 1916	1 year, 237 days	
Augustus James	Nationalist	Minister of Public Instruction	15 November 1916	12 April 1920	3 years, 149 days	
Thomas Mutch	Labor	Minister of Public Instruction	13 April 1920	20 December 1921	1 year, 251 days	
Thomas Ley	Nationalist	Minister of Public Instruction	20 December 1921	20 December 1921	7 hours	
Thomas Mutch	Labor	Minister of Public Instruction	20 December 1921	13 April 1922	114 days	
Albert Bruntnell	Nationalist	Minister of Public Instruction	13 April 1922	17 June 1925	3 years, 65 days	
Thomas Mutch	Labor	Minister for Education	17 June 1925	26 May 1927	1 year, 343 days	
Billy Davies	Labor	Minister of Public Instruction	27 May 1927	18 October 1927	144 days	
David Drummond	Country	Minister for Education	18 October 1927	3 November 1930	3 years, 16 days	
Billy Davies	Labor	Minister for Education	4 November 1930	15 October 1931	1 year, 191 days	
Billy Davies	Labor (NSW)	Minister for Education	15 October 1931	13 May 1932	1 year, 191 days	
David Drummond	Country	Minister for Education	16 May 1932	13 May 1941	8 years, 362 days	
Clive Evatt	Labor	Minister for Education	13 May 1941	8 June 1944	3 years, 26 days	
Robert Heffron	Labor	Minister for Education	8 June 1944	31 May 1960	15 years, 358 days	
Ernest Wetherell	Labor	Minister for Education	31 May 1960	13 May 1965	4 years, 347 days	
Sir Charles Cutler	Country	Minister for Education	13 May 1965	19 June 1972	7 years, 37 days	
Sir Eric Willis	Liberal	Minister for Education	19 June 1972	23 January 1976	3 years, 218 days	
Neil Pickard	Liberal	Minister for Education	23 January 1976	14 May 1976	112 days	
Eric Bedford	Labor	Minister for Education	14 May 1976	29 February 1980	3 years, 291 days	
Paul Landa	Labor	Minister for Education	29 February 1980	2 October 1981	1 year, 216 days	
Ron Mulock	Labor	Minister for Education	2 October 1981	10 February 1984	2 years, 131 days	
Eric Bedford	Labor	Minister for Education	10 February 1984	5 April 1984	55 days	
Rodney Cavalier	Labor	Minister for Education	5 April 1984	21 March 1988	3 years, 351 days	
Terry Metherell	Liberal	Minister for Education and Youth Affairs	25 March 1988	24 July 1990	2 years, 121 days	
Virginia Chadwick	Liberal	Minister for School Education and Youth Affairs	24 July 1990	26 May 1993	4 years, 254 days	
Virginia Chadwick	Liberal	Minister for Education, Training and Youth Affairs	26 May 1993	4 April 1995	4 years, 254 days	
John Aquilina	Labor	Minister for Education and Training	4 April 1995	21 November 2001	6 years, 231 days	
John Watkins	Labor	Minister for Education and Training	21 November 2001	2 April 2003	1 year, 132 days	
Andrew Refshauge	Labor	Minister for Education and Training	2 April 2003	21 January 2005	1 year, 294 days	
Carmel Tebbutt	Labor	Minister for Education and Training	21 January 2005	2 April 2007	2 years, 71 days	
John Della Bosca	Labor	Minister for Education and Training	2 April 2007	8 September 2008	1 year, 159 days	
Verity Firth	Labor	Minister for Education and Training	8 September 2008	28 March 2011	2 years, 201 days	
Adrian Piccoli	National	Minister for Education	3 April 2011	30 January 2017	5 years, 302 days	
Rob Stokes	Liberal	Minister for Education	30 January 2017	23 March 2019	2 years, 52 days	
Sarah Mitchell	National	Minister for Education and Early Childhood Learning	2 April 2019	21 December 2021	3 years, 360 days	
Sarah Mitchell	National	Minister for Education and Early Learning	21 December 2021	28 March 2023	3 years, 360 days	
Prue Car	Labor	Minister for Education and Early Learning	28 March 2023	incumbent	3 years, 202 days	

=== Early Learning ===
Minister	Party	Title	Term start	Term end	Time in office	Notes
Leslie Williams	National	Minister for Early Childhood Education	2 April 2015	23 January 2017	1 year, 296 days	
Sarah Mitchell	National	Minister for Early Childhood Education	30 January 2017	2 April 2019	6 years, 57 days	
Sarah Mitchell	National	Minister for Education and Early Childhood Learning	2 April 2019	21 December 2021	6 years, 57 days	
Sarah Mitchell	National	Minister for Education and Early Learning	21 December 2021	28 March 2023	6 years, 57 days	
Prue Car	Labor	Minister for Education and Early Learning	28 March 2023	incumbent	3 years, 202 days	

== Former ministerial titles ==
=== Assistant ministers ===
Occasionally, an Assistant Minister for Education would be appointed to assist the minister and act as a deputy.

Title	Minister	Party	Term start	Term end	Time in office	Notes
Assistant Minister of Public Instruction	Jack FitzGerald	Labor	4 April 1916	18 July 1916	105 days	
Assistant Minister for Education	Wal Fife	Liberal	13 May 1965	27 June 1967	2 years, 45 days	
Assistant Minister for Education	Bob Debus	Labor	4 July 1986	21 March 1988	11 years, 260 days	
Assistant Minister for Education	Kerry Chikarovski	Liberal	3 July 1992	26 May 1993	327 days	
Assistant Minister for Education	Victor Dominello	Liberal	23 April 2014	2 April 2015	344 days	
Assistant Minister for Education; Minister for Early Childhood Education	Leslie Williams	National	2 April 2015	30 January 2017	1 year, 303 days	
Assistant Minister for Education; Minister for Early Childhood Education	Sarah Mitchell	National	30 January 2017	23 March 2019	2 years, 52 days	

== See also ==
- List of New South Wales government agencies
