= Minister for Agriculture (New South Wales) =

Australian politician

- Incumbent; Tara Moriarty since 5 April 2023
- Department of Primary Industries and Regional Development
- Style: The Honourable
- Nominator: Premier of New South Wales
- Appointer: Governor of New South Wales
- Inaugural holder: Sydney Smith (as Secretary for Mines and Agriculture)
- Formation: 28 February 1890

The New South Wales Minister for Agriculture is responsible for the administration and development of agriculture, fisheries, aquaculture, state forests, biosecurity, and crown lands in New South Wales, Australia.

The current minister, who also serves as the Minister for Western New South Wales, is Tara Moriarty, since 5 April 2023. The minister administers the portfolio through the Regional NSW cluster, including the Department of Regional NSW and a range of other government agencies such as the Department of Primary Industries.

Ultimately the minister is responsible to the Parliament of New South Wales.

== List of ministers ==
=== Agriculture ===
The following individuals have served as Minister for Agriculture, or any precedent titles:

Title	Minister	Party	Term start	Term end	Time in office	Notes
Secretary for Mines and Agriculture	Sydney Smith	Free Trade	28 February 1890	22 October 1891	1 year, 236 days	
Secretary for Mines and Agriculture	Thomas Slattery	Protectionist	23 October 1891	2 August 1894	2 years, 283 days	
Secretary for Mines and Agriculture	Sydney Smith	Free Trade	3 August 1894	15 August 1898	4 years, 12 days	
Secretary for Mines and Agriculture	Joseph Cook	Free Trade	27 August 1898	13 September 1899	1 year, 17 days	
Secretary for Mines and Agriculture	John Fegan	Protectionist	15 September 1899	8 April 1901	1 year, 205 days	
Secretary for Mines and Agriculture	John Kidd	Progressive	10 April 1901	29 August 1904	3 years, 141 days	
Secretary for Mines and Agriculture	Samuel Moore	Liberal Reform	29 August 1904	1 October 1907	3 years, 33 days	
Secretary for Mines and Agriculture	John Perry	Liberal Reform	2 October 1907	21 January 1908	3 years, 18 days	
Minister for Agriculture	John Perry	Liberal Reform	22 January 1908	20 October 1910	3 years, 18 days	
Minister for Agriculture	Donald Macdonell	Labor	21 October 1910	10 September 1911	324 days	
Minister for Agriculture	John Treflé	Labor	11 September 1911	29 January 1914	2 years, 140 days	
Minister for Agriculture	William Ashford	Labor	29 January 1914	23 February 1915	1 year, 25 days	
Minister for Agriculture	George Black	Labor	23 February 1915	15 March 1915	20 days	
Minister for Agriculture	William Ashford	Labor	15 March 1915	1 June 1915	78 days	
Minister for Agriculture	William Grahame	Labor	1 June 1915	15 November 1916	4 years, 227 days	
Minister for Agriculture	William Grahame	Nationalist	15 November 1916	14 January 1920	4 years, 227 days	
Minister for Agriculture	William Ashford	Nationalist	9 February 1920	12 April 1920	63 days	
Minister for Agriculture	Bill Dunn	Labor	12 April 1920	20 December 1921	1 year, 252 days	
Minister for Agriculture	Frank Chaffey	Nationalist	20 December 1921	20 December 1921	7 hours	
Minister for Agriculture	Bill Dunn	Labor	20 December 1921	13 April 1922	114 days	
Minister for Agriculture	Richard Ball	Nationalist	13 April 1922	28 June 1922	76 days	
Minister for Agriculture	Frank Chaffey	Nationalist	28 June 1922	17 June 1925	2 years, 354 days	
Minister for Agriculture	Bill Dunn	Labor	17 June 1925	26 May 1927	1 year, 343 days	
Minister for Agriculture	Paddy Stokes	Labor	27 May 1927	18 October 1927	144 days	
Minister for Agriculture	Harold Thorby	Country	18 October 1927	3 November 1930	3 years, 16 days	
Minister for Agriculture; Minister for Forests	Bill Dunn	Labor	4 November 1930	15 October 1931	1 year, 191 days	
Minister for Agriculture; Minister for Forests	Bill Dunn	Labor (NSW)	15 October 1931	13 May 1932	1 year, 191 days	
Minister for Agriculture; Minister for Forests	Hugh Main	Country	16 May 1932	1 April 1938	5 years, 320 days	
Minister for Agriculture; Secretary for Mines; Minister for Forests	Roy Vincent	Country	2 April 1938	13 April 1938	11 days	
Minister for Agriculture	Albert Reid	Country	13 April 1938	16 May 1941	3 years, 33 days	
Minister for Agriculture and Forests	Bill Dunn	Labor	16 May 1941	8 June 1944	3 years, 23 days	
Minister for Agriculture	Eddie Graham	Labor	8 June 1944	6 February 1947	2 years, 243 days	
Minister for Agriculture	James McGirr	Labor	6 February 1947	13 February 1947	7 days	
Minister for Agriculture	Eddie Graham	Labor	13 February 1947	23 February 1953	6 years, 17 days	
Minister for Agriculture; Minister for Food Production	Eddie Graham	Labor	23 February 1953	13 November 1957	6 years, 17 days	
Minister for Agriculture; Minister for Food Production	Roger Nott	Labor	14 November 1957	1 April 1959	3 years, 109 days	
Minister for Agriculture	Roger Nott	Labor	1 April 1959	3 March 1961	3 years, 109 days	
Minister for Agriculture	Jack Renshaw	Labor	3 March 1961	14 March 1962	1 year, 11 days	
Minister for Agriculture	George Enticknap	Labor	14 March 1962	13 May 1965	3 years, 60 days	
Minister for Agriculture	Bill Chaffey	Country	13 May 1965	5 March 1968	2 years, 297 days	
Minister for Agriculture	Geoff Crawford	Country	5 March 1968	17 December 1975	7 years, 287 days	
Minister for Agriculture; Minister for Water Resources	Bruce Cowan	Country	17 December 1975	14 May 1976	149 days	
Minister for Primary Industries	Don Day	Labor	14 May 1976	19 October 1978	3 years, 291 days	
Minister for Agriculture	Don Day	Labor	19 October 1978	29 February 1980	3 years, 291 days	
Minister for Agriculture	Jack Hallam	Labor	29 February 1980	2 October 1981	8 years, 21 days	
Minister for Agriculture and Fisheries	Jack Hallam	Labor	2 October 1981	4 July 1986	8 years, 21 days	
Minister for Agriculture	Jack Hallam	Labor	4 July 1986	21 March 1988	8 years, 21 days	
Minister for Agriculture and Rural Affairs	Ian Armstrong	National	25 March 1988	26 May 1993	5 years, 66 days	
Minister for Agriculture and Fisheries	Ian Causley	National	26 May 1993	4 April 1995	1 year, 313 days	
Minister for Agriculture	Richard Amery	Labor	4 April 1995	2 April 2003	7 years, 363 days	
Minister for Agriculture and Fisheries	Ian Macdonald	Labor	2 April 2003	3 May 2004	6 years, 229 days	
Minister for Primary Industries	Ian Macdonald	Labor	3 May 2004	17 November 2009	6 years, 229 days	
Minister for Primary Industries	Tony Kelly	Labor	17 November 2009	8 December 2009	21 days	
Minister for Primary Industries	Steve Whan	Labor	8 December 2009	28 March 2011	1 year, 110 days	
Minister for Primary Industries	Katrina Hodgkinson	National	3 April 2011	2 April 2015	3 years, 364 days	
Minister for Primary Industries	Niall Blair	National	2 April 2015	23 March 2019	3 years, 355 days	
Minister for Agriculture and Western New South Wales	Adam Marshall	National	2 April 2019	21 December 2021	2 years, 263 days	
Minister for Agriculture	Dugald Saunders	National	21 December 2021	28 March 2023	1 year, 97 days	
Minister for Roads	John Graham	Labor	28 March 2023	5 April 2023	8 days	
Minister for Agriculture	Tara Moriarty	Labor	5 April 2023	incumbent	3 years, 155 days	

== Former ministerial titles ==
=== Fisheries ===
The Minister for Agriculture and Fisheries was created in 1981 in the fourth Wran ministry. The portfolio had responsibility for the administration and management of oyster farms and fisheries in New South Wales, Australia. Prior to 1981 fisheries had been part of the responsibilities of the Minister for Conservation. The portfolio was abolished in 2004 in the fourth Carr ministry with the portfolio renamed Primary Industries.

Title	Minister	Party	Ministry	Term start	Term end	Time in office	Notes
Minister for Agriculture and Fisheries	Jack Hallam	Labor	Wran (4) (5) (6) (7) (8)	2 October 1981	4 July 1986	4 years, 275 days	
Minister for Agriculture and Fisheries	Ian Causley	National	Fahey (3)	26 May 1993	4 April 1995	1 year, 313 days	
Minister for Fisheries	Bob Martin	Labor	Carr (1) (2)	4 April 1995	8 April 1999	4 years, 4 days	
Minister for Fisheries	Eddie Obeid	Labor	Carr (3)	8 April 1999	2 April 2003	3 years, 359 days	
Minister for Agriculture and Fisheries	Ian Macdonald	Labor	Carr (4)	2 April 2003	3 May 2004	1 year, 31 days	

=== Forests ===
Title	Minister	Party	Term start	Term end	Time in office	Notes
Secretary for Lands; Minister for Forests	William Ashford	Nationalist	15 November 1916	12 April 1920	3 years, 149 days	
Secretary for Lands; Minister for Forests	Peter Loughlin	Labor	12 April 1920	20 December 1921	1 year, 252 days	
Secretary for Lands; Minister for Forests	Walter Wearne	Nationalist	20 December 1921	20 December 1921	7 hours	
Secretary for Lands; Minister for Forests	Peter Loughlin	Labor	20 December 1921	13 April 1922	114 days	
Secretary for Lands; Minister for Forests	Walter Wearne	Nationalist	13 April 1922	17 June 1925	3 years, 65 days	
Secretary for Lands; Minister for Forests	Peter Loughlin	Labor	17 June 1925	19 November 1926	1 year, 155 days	
Secretary for Lands; Minister for Forests	Jack Lang	Labor	25 November 1926	26 May 1927	182 days	
Secretary for Lands; Minister for Forests	Ted Horsington	Labor	26 May 1927	18 October 1927	145 days	
Minister for Forests	Frank Chaffey	Nationalist	18 October 1927	15 April 1929	1 year, 179 days	
Minister for Forests	Reginald Weaver	Nationalist	15 April 1929	3 November 1930	1 year, 202 days	
Minister for Agriculture and Forests	Bill Dunn	Labor	4 November 1930	15 October 1931	1 year, 191 days	
Minister for Agriculture and Forests	Bill Dunn	Labor (NSW)	15 October 1931	13 May 1932	1 year, 191 days	
Minister for Agriculture; Minister for Forests	Hugh Main	Country	16 May 1932	17 June 1932	32 days	
Minister for Forests	Roy Vincent	Country	18 June 1932	16 May 1941	8 years, 332 days	
Minister for Agriculture and Forests	Bill Dunn	Labor	16 May 1941	8 June 1944	3 years, 23 days	
Minister for Lands; Minister for Forests	Milton Morris	Liberal	3 January 1975	30 June 1975	178 days	
Minister for Lands; Minister for Forests	John Mason	Liberal	30 June 1975	23 January 1976	207 days	
Minister for Lands; Minister for Forests	Col Fisher	Country	23 January 1976	14 May 1976	112 days	
Minister for Lands; Minister for Forests; Minister for Water Resources	Lin Gordon	Labor	29 February 1980	2 October 1981	1 year, 216 days	
Minister for Water Resources; Minister for Forests	Paul Whelan	Labor	1 February 1983	5 April 1984	1 year, 64 days	
Minister for Forests	Jack Hallam	Labor	5 November 1986	21 March 1988	1 year, 137 days	
Minister for Lands and Forests	Garry West	National	24 July 1990	6 June 1991	317 days	
Minister for Forestry	Kim Yeadon	Labor	1 December 1997	2 April 2003	5 years, 122 days	
Minister Assisting the Minister for Natural Resources (Forests)	Michael Costa	Labor	2 April 2003	1 July 2004	1 year, 90 days	
Minister for Mineral and Forest Resources	Ian Macdonald	Labor	4 December 2009	4 June 2010	182 days	
Minister for Mineral and Forest Resources	Paul McLeay	Labor	4 June 2010	1 September 2010	89 days	
Minister for Mineral and Forest Resources	Steve Whan	Labor	6 September 2010	28 March 2011	203 days	
Minister for Lands and Forestry	Paul Toole	National	30 January 2017	23 March 2019	2 years, 52 days	

=== Rural affairs ===
The Minister for Rural Affairs was a ministry in New South Wales. It was initially established as an addendum to the Agriculture portfolio, adding responsibilities for rural land protection and rural adjustment grants. It was first established in the first Greiner ministry in 1988 and abolished in 1993. It was re-established in the second Carr ministry and abolished in 2011, with the responsibilities absorbed into the Primary Industries portfolio.

Title	Minister	Party	Term start	Term end	Time in office	Notes
Minister for Agriculture and Rural Affairs	Ian Armstrong	National	25 March 1988	26 May 1993	5 years, 93 days	
Minister for Rural Affairs	Harry Woods	Labor	1 December 1997	2 April 2003	5 years, 122 days	
Minister for Rural Affairs	Tony Kelly	Labor	2 April 2003	5 September 2008	5 years, 156 days	
Minister for Rural Affairs	Phil Costa	Labor	8 September 2008	30 January 2009	144 days	
Minister for Rural Affairs	Tony Kelly	Labor	30 January 2009	14 September 2009	227 days	
Minister for Rural Affairs	Steve Whan	Labor	14 September 2009	28 March 2011	1 year, 195 days	

== See also ==
- List of New South Wales government agencies
