= Carr ministry (2003–2005) =

88th ministry of the New South Wales Government

Fourth Carr ministry
- 88th Cabinet of Government of New South Wales

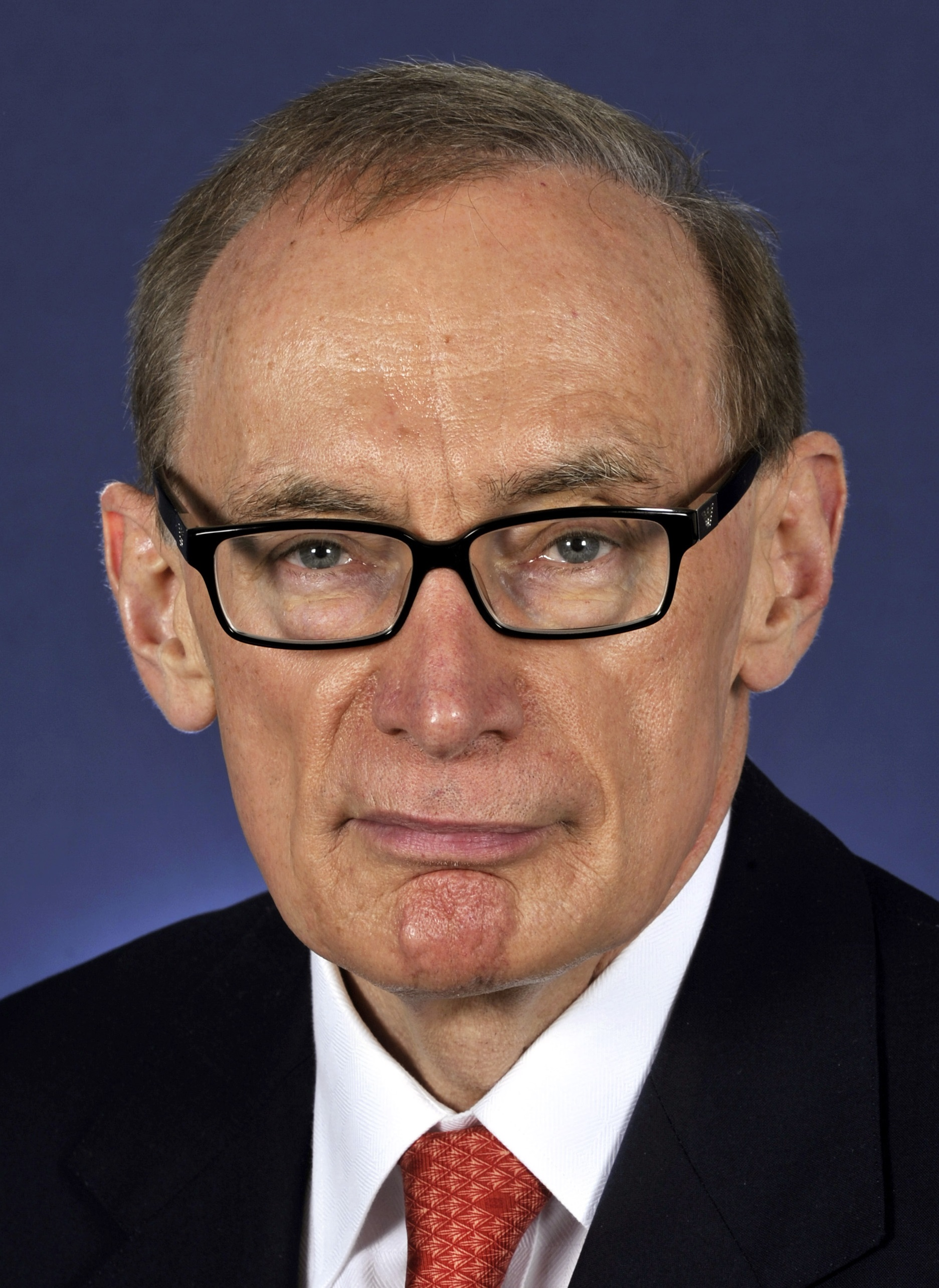
- Premier Bob Carr
- Date formed: 2 April 2003
- Date dissolved: 3 August 2005

People and organisations
- Monarch: Queen Elizabeth II
- Governor: Marie Bashir
- Deputy Premier: Andrew Refshauge
- No. of ministers: 21
- Member party: Labor
- Status in legislature: Majority Labor Government
- Opposition parties: Liberal–National coalition
- Opposition leader: John Brogden

History
- Election: 2003 New South Wales state election
- Predecessor: Third Carr ministry
- Successor: First Iemma ministry

The Carr ministry (2003–2005) or Fourth Carr ministry was the 88th ministry of the New South Wales Government, and was led by the 39th Premier of New South Wales, Bob Carr, representing the Labor Party.

The ministry covered the period from 2 April 2003, when Carr led Labor to victory at the 2003 state election, until 3 August 2005, when Carr resigned as Leader of the Labor Party in New South Wales and hence, as Premier. Carr was succeeded by Morris Iemma.

== Composition of ministry ==
The first arrangement covered the period from 2 April 2003 until 3 May 2004, when there was a minor reconfiguration of the ministry. (Note: On 3 May 2004 Tony Kelly's portfolio of Assisting the Minister for Natural Resources (Lands) was renamed as Lands.) (Note: On 3 May 2004 Ian Macdonald's portfolio of Agriculture and Fisheries was renamed as Primary Industries.)

The second arrangement covered the period from 3 May 2004, inclusive of minor changes in July (Note: On 1 July 2004 Michael Costa's portfolio of assisting the Minister for Natural Resources (Forests) was abolished.) and August, (Note: On 5 August 2004 Michael Costa was appointed to a new role of assisting the Minister for State Development.) until 21 January 2005, when Michael Egan resigned from the ministry, resulting in a major reconfiguration of the ministry. Egan resigned from parliament a few days later. (Note: On 21 January 2005 Michael Egan resigned from the ministry. His portfolios of Treasurer and State Development were transferred to Andrew Refshauge. Egan's role as Leader of the Government in the Legislative Council and the sinecure position of Vice-President of the Executive Council was transferred to John Della Bosca.) (Note: Police portfolio transferred from Watkins to Scully.) (Note: Roads portfolio transferred from Scully to Costa.) (Note: Economic Reform and Ports portfolios created for Costa.) (Note: Transport Services portfolio renamed as Transport and transferred from Costa to Watkins.) (Note: Education and Training portfolio transferred from Refshauge to Tebbutt.) (Note: Community Services and Youth portfolios transferred from Tebbutt to Meagher.) (Note: Central Coast portfolio transferred from Della Bosca to McBride.) (Note: Housing portfolio transferred from Scully to Tripodi, who entered the ministry.)

The third arrangement covered the period from 21 January 2005, when Michael Egan resigned from the ministry, and includes a minor reconfiguration on 1 February 2005, until 3 August 2005 when the ministry was dissolved following the resignations of both Bob Carr and his deputy, Andrew Refshauge. Craig Knowles, once considered a strong candidate to succeed Carr as premier, resigned from the ministry the same day and resigned from parliament a few days later.

Portfolio	Minister	Party	Term commence	Term end	Term of office
Premier	Bob Carr (Note: Retained portfolio from the third Carr ministry.)	Labor	2 April 2003	3 August 2005	2 years, 123 days
Minister for the Arts	Bob Carr	Labor	2 April 2003	3 August 2005	2 years, 123 days
Minister for Citizenship	Bob Carr	Labor	2 April 2003	3 August 2005	2 years, 123 days
Deputy Premier	Andrew Refshauge	Labor	2 April 2003	3 August 2005	2 years, 123 days
Minister for Aboriginal Affairs	Andrew Refshauge	Labor	2 April 2003	3 August 2005	2 years, 123 days
Minister for Education and Training	Andrew Refshauge	Labor	2 April 2003	21 January 2005	1 year, 294 days
Minister for Education and Training	Carmel Tebbutt	Labor	21 January 2005	3 August 2005	194 days
Treasurer	Michael Egan, MLC	Labor	2 April 2003	21 January 2005	1 year, 294 days
Treasurer	Andrew Refshauge	Labor	21 January 2005	3 August 2005	194 days
Minister for State Development	Michael Egan, MLC	Labor	2 April 2003	21 January 2005	1 year, 294 days
Minister for State Development	Andrew Refshauge	Labor	21 January 2005	3 August 2005	194 days
Vice-President of the Executive Council; Leader of the Government in Legislative Council	Michael Egan, MLC	Labor	2 April 2003	21 January 2005	1 year, 294 days
Vice-President of the Executive Council; Leader of the Government in Legislative Council	John Della Bosca, MLC	Labor	21 January 2005	3 August 2005	194 days
Special Minister of State	John Della Bosca, MLC	Labor	2 April 2003	3 August 2005	2 years, 123 days
Minister for Industrial Relations	John Della Bosca, MLC	Labor	2 April 2003	3 August 2005	2 years, 123 days
Minister for Commerce	John Della Bosca, MLC	Labor	2 April 2003	3 August 2005	2 years, 123 days
Assistant Treasurer	John Della Bosca, MLC	Labor	2 April 2003	3 August 2005	2 years, 123 days
Minister for the Central Coast	John Della Bosca, MLC	Labor	2 April 2003	1 February 2005	1 year, 305 days
Minister for the Central Coast	Grant McBride	Labor	1 February 2005	3 August 2005	183 days
Minister for Infrastructure and Planning	Craig Knowles	Labor	2 April 2003	3 August 2005	2 years, 123 days
Minister for Natural Resources	Craig Knowles	Labor	2 April 2003	3 August 2005	2 years, 123 days
Attorney General	Bob Debus	Labor	2 April 2003	3 August 2005	2 years, 123 days
Minister for the Environment	Bob Debus	Labor	2 April 2003	3 August 2005	2 years, 123 days
Minister for Roads	Carl Scully	Labor	2 April 2003	21 January 2005	1 year, 294 days
Minister for Roads	Michael Costa, MLC	Labor	1 February 2005	3 August 2005	183 days
Minister for Housing	Carl Scully	Labor	2 April 2003	1 February 2005	1 year, 305 days
Minister for Housing	Joe Tripodi	Labor	1 February 2005	3 August 2005	183 days
Minister for Health	Morris Iemma	Labor	2 April 2003	3 August 2005	2 years, 123 days
Minister for Transport Services	Michael Costa, MLC	Labor	2 April 2003	21 January 2005	1 year, 294 days
Minister for Transport	John Watkins	Labor	21 January 2005	3 August 2005	194 days
Minister for the Hunter	Michael Costa, MLC	Labor	2 April 2003	3 August 2005	2 years, 123 days
Minister Assisting the Minister for Natural Resources (Forests)	Michael Costa, MLC	Labor	2 April 2003	1 July 2004	1 year, 90 days
Minister Assisting the Minister for State Development	Michael Costa, MLC	Labor	5 August 2004	21 January 2005	169 days
Minister for Economic Reform	Michael Costa, MLC	Labor	21 January 2005	3 August 2005	194 days
Minister for Ports	Michael Costa, MLC	Labor	21 January 2005	3 August 2005	194 days
Minister for Police	John Watkins	Labor	2 April 2003	21 January 2005	1 year, 294 days
Minister for Police	Carl Scully	Labor	21 January 2005	3 August 2005	194 days
Minister for Community Services	Carmel Tebbutt	Labor	2 April 2003	21 January 2005	1 year, 294 days
Minister for Community Services	Reba Meagher	Labor	21 January 2005	3 August 2005	194 days
Minister for Aging	Carmel Tebbutt	Labor	2 April 2003	21 January 2005	1 year, 294 days
Minister for Aging	John Della Bosca, MLC	Labor	21 January 2005	3 August 2005	194 days
Minister for Disability Services	Carmel Tebbutt	Labor	2 April 2003	21 January 2005	1 year, 294 days
Minister for Disability Services	John Della Bosca, MLC	Labor	21 January 2005	3 August 2005	194 days
Minister for Youth	Carmel Tebbutt	Labor	2 April 2003	21 January 2005	1 year, 294 days
Minister for Youth	Reba Meagher	Labor	21 January 2005	3 August 2005	194 days
Minister for Energy and Utilities	Frank Sartor	Labor	2 April 2003	3 August 2005	2 years, 123 days
Minister for Science and Medical Research	Frank Sartor	Labor	2 April 2003	3 August 2005	2 years, 123 days
Minister Assisting the Minister for Health (Cancer)	Frank Sartor	Labor	2 April 2003	3 August 2005	2 years, 123 days
Minister Assisting the Premier on the Arts	Frank Sartor	Labor	2 April 2003	3 August 2005	2 years, 123 days
Minister for Tourism and Sport and Recreation	Sandra Nori	Labor	2 April 2003	3 August 2005	2 years, 123 days
Minister for Rural Affairs	Tony Kelly, MLC	Labor	2 April 2003	3 August 2005	2 years, 123 days
Minister for Local Government	Tony Kelly, MLC	Labor	2 April 2003	3 August 2005	2 years, 123 days
Minister for Emergency Services	Tony Kelly, MLC	Labor	2 April 2003	3 August 2005	2 years, 123 days
Minister Assisting the Minister for Natural Resources (Lands)	Tony Kelly, MLC	Labor	2 April 2003	3 May 2004	1 year, 31 days
Minister for Lands	Tony Kelly, MLC	Labor	3 May 2004	3 August 2005	1 year, 92 days
Minister Assisting the Minister for Natural Resources	Tony Kelly, MLC	Labor	15 June 2005	3 August 2005	49 days
Minister for Regional Development	David Campbell	Labor	2 April 2003	3 August 2005	2 years, 123 days
Minister for the Illawarra	David Campbell	Labor	2 April 2003	3 August 2005	2 years, 123 days
Minister for Small Business	David Campbell	Labor	2 April 2003	3 August 2005	2 years, 123 days
Minister for Agriculture and Fisheries	Ian Macdonald, MLC	Labor	2 April 2003	3 May 2004	1 year, 31 days
Minister for Primary Industries	Ian Macdonald, MLC	Labor	3 May 2004	3 August 2005	1 year, 92 days
Minister for Juvenile Justice	Diane Beamer	Labor	2 April 2003	3 August 2005	2 years, 123 days
Minister for Western Sydney	Diane Beamer	Labor	2 April 2003	3 August 2005	2 years, 123 days
Minister Assisting the Minister for Infrastructure and Planning (Planning Administration)	Diane Beamer	Labor	2 April 2003	3 August 2005	2 years, 123 days
Minister for Fair Trading	Reba Meagher	Labor	2 April 2003	21 January 2005	1 year, 294 days
Minister for Fair Trading	John Hatzistergos, MLC	Labor	1 February 2005	3 August 2005	183 days
Minister Assisting the Minister for Commerce	Reba Meagher	Labor	2 April 2003	21 January 2005	1 year, 294 days
Minister Assisting the Minister for Commerce	John Hatzistergos, MLC	Labor	1 February 2005	3 August 2005	183 days
Minister for Justice	John Hatzistergos, MLC	Labor	2 April 2003	3 August 2005	2 years, 123 days
Minister Assisting the Premier on Citizenship	John Hatzistergos, MLC	Labor	2 April 2003	3 August 2005	2 years, 123 days
Minister for Gaming and Racing	Grant McBride	Labor	2 April 2003	3 August 2005	2 years, 123 days
Minister for Mineral Resources	Kerry Hickey	Labor	2 April 2003	3 August 2005	2 years, 123 days

Ministers are members of the Legislative Assembly unless otherwise noted.

== See also ==
- Members of the New South Wales Legislative Assembly, 2003–2007
- Members of the New South Wales Legislative Council, 2003–2007

== Notes ==
New South Wales government ministries
Preceded by Carr ministry (1999–2003)	Fourth Carr ministry 2003–2005	Succeeded by Iemma ministry (2005–2007)
