= Iemma ministry (2005–2007) =

Government of New South Wales, Australia

First Iemma ministry
- 89th Cabinet of New South Wales

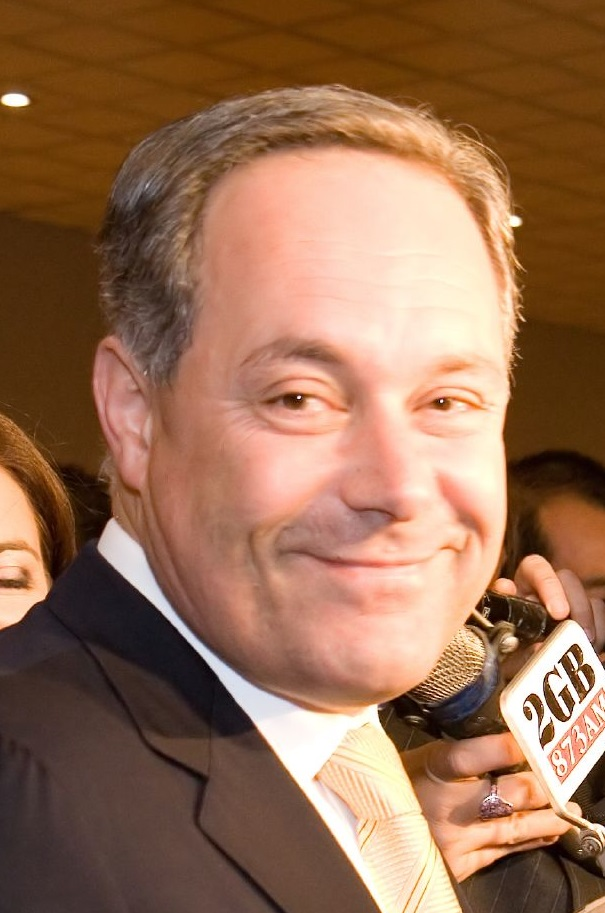
- Premier Morris Iemma
- Date formed: 3 August 2005
- Date dissolved: 2 April 2007

People and organisations
- Monarch: Queen Elizabeth II
- Governor: Marie Bashir)
- Premier: Morris Iemma
- Deputy Premier: John Watkins
- No. of ministers: 21
- Member party: Labor
- Status in legislature: Labor Majority Government
- Opposition party: Liberal–National Coalition
- Opposition leader: Peter Debnam; Barry O'Farrell

History
- Outgoing election: 2007 New South Wales state election
- Predecessor: Fourth Carr ministry
- Successor: Second Iemma ministry

The Iemma ministry (2005–2007) or First Iemma ministry is the 89th ministry of the Government of New South Wales, and was led by the 40th Premier Morris Iemma. It was the first of two occasions when Iemma was Premier.

The 1st Iemma Labor ministry was formed following the shock retirement of Bob Carr as Premier after Carr had the longest continuous service as Premier, from 1995 until 2005. Iemma succeeded Carr after a bitter inter-factional battle against Carl Scully who withdrew from the caucus contest after Iemma received backing from Labor's head office and powerbrokers in the dominant NSW Right of the Labor Party.

This ministry covers the period from 3 August 2005 until 2 April 2007, when the outcome of the 2007 state election was determined and Iemma re-elected for a second term.

== Composition of ministry ==
The composition of the ministry was announced by Premier Iemma on 3 August 2005. Hours before the swearing in ceremony senior ministers Andrew Refshauge and Craig Knowles announced their resignations, resulting in a reshuffle. (Note: On 10 August 2005 John Watkins was appointed Deputy Premier.) (Note: On 10 August 2005 the portfolio of Aboriginal Affairs transferred from Carmel Tebbutt to Milton Orkopoulos.) (Note: On 10 August 2005 the portfolio of Ports and Waterways transferred from Michael Costa to Eric Roozendaal.) (Note: On 10 August 2005 the portfolio of Housing transferred from Joe Tripodi to Cherie Burton.) There was a further ministerial reshuffle on 17 February 2006. (Note: On 17 February 2006 the Treasury portfolio transferred from Morris Iemma to Michael Costa.) (Note: On 17 February 2006 the portfolio of State Development transferred from John Watkins to Morris Iemma.) (Note: On 17 February 2006 John Della Bosca's portfolio of Special Minister of State was abolished and his portfolio of Assistant Treasurer was transferred to Joe Tripodi as Assisting the Treasurer on Business and Economic Regulatory Reform.) (Note: On 17 February 2006 Carl Scully's portfolio of Utilities was abolished and replaced by Joe Tripodi in the portfolio of Energy and David Campbell in the portfolio of Water Utilities.) (Note: On 17 February 2006 Michael Costa's portfolio of Finance was transferred to John Della Bosca.) (Note: On 17 February 2006 Eric Roozendaal's portfolio of Ports and Waterways was transferred to Joe Tripodi.) (Note: On 17 February 2006 the portfolio of Roads was transferred from Joe Tripodi to Eric Roozendaal.) In October 2006 Carl Scully was sacked from the ministry for misleading parliament. (Note: Carl Scully was sacked from the ministry on 26 October 2006 and his Police portfolio was transferred to John Watkins.) In November 2006 Milton Orkopoulos was charged with criminal offences and was sacked from the ministry. (Note: On 9 November 2006 Milton Orkopoulos was sacked from the ministry. His portfolios of Minister for Aboriginal Affairs and Assisting the Premier on Citizenship were transferred to Reba Meagher.) (Note: On 9 November 2006 Eric Roozendaal returned to the ministry in the portfolio Assisting the Minister for Transport.)

| Portfolio | Minister | Party | Term commence | Term end | Term of office |
|---|---|---|---|---|---|
| Premier | Morris Iemma | Labor | 3 August 2005 | 2 April 2007 | 1 year, 242 days |
| Minister for Citizenship | Morris Iemma | Labor | 3 August 2005 | 2 April 2007 | 1 year, 242 days |
| Treasurer | Morris Iemma | Labor | 3 August 2005 | 17 February 2006 | 198 days |
| Treasurer | Michael Costa, MLC | Labor | 17 February 2006 | 2 April 2007 | 1 year, 44 days |
| Deputy Premier | John Watkins | Labor | 10 August 2005 | 2 April 2007 | 1 year, 235 days |
| Minister for Transport (Note: Retained portfolio from the fourth Carr ministry.) | John Watkins | Labor | 3 August 2005 | 2 April 2007 | 1 year, 242 days |
| Minister for State Development | John Watkins | Labor | 3 August 2005 | 17 February 2006 | 198 days |
| Minister for State Development | Morris Iemma | Labor | 17 February 2006 | 2 April 2007 | 1 year, 44 days |
| Special Minister of State | John Della Bosca, MLC | Labor | 3 August 2005 | 2 April 2007 | 1 year, 242 days |
| Minister for Commerce | John Della Bosca, MLC | Labor | 3 August 2005 | 2 April 2007 | 1 year, 242 days |
| Minister for Industrial Relations | John Della Bosca, MLC | Labor | 3 August 2005 | 2 April 2007 | 1 year, 242 days |
| Minister for Aging | John Della Bosca, MLC | Labor | 3 August 2005 | 2 April 2007 | 1 year, 242 days |
| Minister for Disability Services | John Della Bosca, MLC | Labor | 3 August 2005 | 2 April 2007 | 1 year, 242 days |
| Vice-President of the Executive Council; Leader of the Government in Legislative Council | John Della Bosca, MLC | Labor | 3 August 2005 | 2 April 2007 | 1 year, 242 days |
| Assistant Treasurer | John Della Bosca, MLC | Labor | 3 August 2005 | 17 February 2006 | 198 days |
| Minister Assisting the Treasurer on Business and Economic Regulatory Reform | Joe Tripodi | Labor | 17 February 2006 | 2 April 2007 | 1 year, 44 days |
| Attorney-General | Bob Debus | Labor | 3 August 2005 | 2 April 2007 | 1 year, 242 days |
| Minister for the Environment | Bob Debus | Labor | 3 August 2005 | 2 April 2007 | 1 year, 242 days |
| Minister for the Arts | Bob Debus | Labor | 3 August 2005 | 2 April 2007 | 1 year, 242 days |
| Minister for Police | Carl Scully | Labor | 3 August 2005 | 17 February 2006 | 198 days |
| Minister for Police | John Watkins | Labor | 26 October 2006 | 2 April 2007 | 158 days |
| Minister for Utilities | Carl Scully | Labor | 3 August 2005 | 26 October 2006 | 1 year, 84 days |
| Minister for Energy | Joe Tripodi | Labor | 17 February 2006 | 2 April 2007 | 1 year, 44 days |
| Minister for Water Utilities | David Campbell | Labor | 17 February 2006 | 2 April 2007 | 1 year, 44 days |
| Minister for Aboriginal Affairs | Carmel Tebbutt | Labor | 3 August 2005 | 10 August 2005 | 7 days |
| Minister for Aboriginal Affairs | Milton Orkopoulos | Labor | 10 August 2005 | 8 November 2006 | 1 year, 90 days |
| Minister for Aboriginal Affairs | Reba Meagher | Labor | 8 November 2006 | 2 April 2007 | 145 days |
| Minister for Education and Training | Carmel Tebbutt | Labor | 3 August 2005 | 2 April 2007 | 1 year, 242 days |
| Minister for Ports and Waterways | Michael Costa, MLC | Labor | 3 August 2005 | 10 August 2005 | 7 days |
| Minister for Ports and Waterways | Eric Roozendaal, MLC | Labor | 10 August 2005 | 17 February 2006 | 191 days |
| Minister for Ports and Waterways | Joe Tripodi | Labor | 17 February 2006 | 2 April 2007 | 1 year, 44 days |
| Minister for Finance | Michael Costa, MLC | Labor | 3 August 2005 | 17 February 2006 | 198 days |
| Minister for Finance | John Della Bosca, MLC | Labor | 17 February 2006 | 2 April 2007 | 1 year, 44 days |
| Minister for Infrastructure | Michael Costa, MLC | Labor | 3 August 2005 | 2 April 2007 | 1 year, 242 days |
| Minister for the Hunter | Michael Costa, MLC | Labor | 3 August 2005 | 2 April 2007 | 1 year, 242 days |
| Minister for Health | John Hatzistergos, MLC | Labor | 3 August 2005 | 2 April 2007 | 1 year, 242 days |
| Minister for Planning | Frank Sartor | Labor | 3 August 2005 | 2 April 2007 | 1 year, 242 days |
| Minister for Redfern Waterloo | Frank Sartor | Labor | 3 August 2005 | 2 April 2007 | 1 year, 242 days |
| Minister for Science and Medical Research | Frank Sartor | Labor | 3 August 2005 | 2 April 2007 | 1 year, 242 days |
| Minister Assisting the Minister for Health (Cancer) | Frank Sartor | Labor | 3 August 2005 | 2 April 2007 | 1 year, 242 days |
| Minister for Community Services | Reba Meagher | Labor | 3 August 2005 | 2 April 2007 | 1 year, 242 days |
| Minister for Youth | Reba Meagher | Labor | 3 August 2005 | 2 April 2007 | 1 year, 242 days |
| Minister for Tourism and Sport and Recreation | Sandra Nori | Labor | 3 August 2005 | 2 April 2007 | 1 year, 242 days |
| Minister for Women | Sandra Nori | Labor | 3 August 2005 | 2 April 2007 | 1 year, 242 days |
| Minister Assisting the Minister for State Development | Sandra Nori | Labor | 3 August 2005 | 2 April 2007 | 1 year, 242 days |
| Minister for Natural Resources | Ian Macdonald, MLC | Labor | 3 August 2005 | 2 April 2007 | 1 year, 242 days |
| Minister for Primary Industries | Ian Macdonald, MLC | Labor | 3 August 2005 | 2 April 2007 | 1 year, 242 days |
| Minister for Mineral Resources | Ian Macdonald, MLC | Labor | 3 August 2005 | 2 April 2007 | 1 year, 242 days |
| Minister for Justice | Tony Kelly, MLC | Labor | 3 August 2005 | 2 April 2007 | 1 year, 242 days |
| Minister for Juvenile Justice | Tony Kelly, MLC | Labor | 3 August 2005 | 2 April 2007 | 1 year, 242 days |
| Minister for Emergency Services | Tony Kelly, MLC | Labor | 3 August 2005 | 2 April 2007 | 1 year, 242 days |
| Minister for Lands | Tony Kelly, MLC | Labor | 3 August 2005 | 2 April 2007 | 1 year, 242 days |
| Minister for Rural Affairs | Tony Kelly, MLC | Labor | 3 August 2005 | 2 April 2007 | 1 year, 242 days |
| Minister for Western Sydney | Diane Beamer | Labor | 3 August 2005 | 2 April 2007 | 1 year, 242 days |
| Minister for Fair Trading | Diane Beamer | Labor | 3 August 2005 | 2 April 2007 | 1 year, 242 days |
| Minister Assisting the Minister for Commerce | Diane Beamer | Labor | 3 August 2005 | 2 April 2007 | 1 year, 242 days |
| Minister for Roads | Joe Tripodi | Labor | 3 August 2005 | 17 February 2006 | 198 days |
| Minister for Housing | Joe Tripodi | Labor | 3 August 2005 | 10 August 2005 | 7 days |
| Minister for Housing | Cherie Burton | Labor | 10 August 2005 | 2 April 2007 | 1 year, 235 days |
| Minister Assisting the Minister for Health (Mental Health) | Cherie Burton | Labor | 10 August 2005 | 2 April 2007 | 1 year, 235 days |
| Minister for Regional Development | David Campbell | Labor | 3 August 2005 | 2 April 2007 | 1 year, 242 days |
| Minister for the Illawarra | David Campbell | Labor | 3 August 2005 | 2 April 2007 | 1 year, 242 days |
| Minister for Small Business | David Campbell | Labor | 3 August 2005 | 2 April 2007 | 1 year, 242 days |
| Minister for Gaming and Racing | Grant McBride | Labor | 3 August 2005 | 2 April 2007 | 1 year, 242 days |
| Minister for the Central Coast | Grant McBride | Labor | 3 August 2005 | 2 April 2007 | 1 year, 242 days |
| Minister for Local Government | Kerry Hickey | Labor | 3 August 2005 | 2 April 2007 | 1 year, 242 days |
| Minister Assisting the Premier on Citizenship | Milton Orkopoulos | Labor | 10 August 2005 | 8 November 2006 | 1 year, 90 days |
| Minister Assisting the Premier on Citizenship | Reba Meagher | Labor | 8 November 2006 | 2 April 2007 | 145 days |
| Minister Assisting the Minister for Transport | Eric Roozendaal, MLC | Labor | 8 November 2006 | 2 April 2007 | 145 days |

Ministers are members of the Legislative Assembly unless otherwise noted.

== See also ==
- Members of the New South Wales Legislative Assembly, 2003–2007
- Members of the New South Wales Legislative Council, 2003-2007

== Notes ==
New South Wales government ministries
| Preceded by Fourth Carr ministry 2003–2005 | First Iemma ministry 2005–2007 | Succeeded by Second Iemma ministry 2007–2008 |
