= Rees ministry =

91st New South Wales government, led by Nathan Rees

- 91st Cabinet of New South Wales

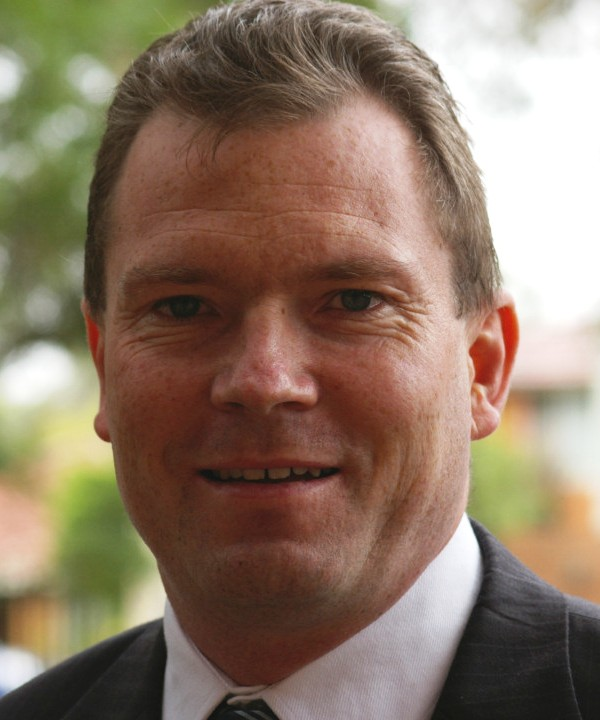
- Premier Nathan Rees, pictured in 2007
- Date formed: 5 September 2008
- Date dissolved: 4 December 2009

People and organisations
- Monarch: Queen Elizabeth II
- Governor: Marie Bashir
- Premier: Nathan Rees
- Deputy Premier: Carmel Tebbutt
- No. of ministers: 23
- Member party: Labor
- Status in legislature: Labor Majority Government
- Opposition party: Liberal–National Coalition
- Opposition leader: Barry O'Farrell

History
- Predecessor: Second Iemma ministry
- Successor: Keneally ministry

The Rees ministry was the 91st ministry of the Government of New South Wales, and was led by the 41st Premier Nathan Rees.

The Rees Labor ministry was formed following the resignation of Premier Morris Iemma on 5 September 2008 and the unanimous election of Rees as Leader of the Labor caucus and Carmel Tebbutt as Deputy Leader.

On 5 September Rees and Tebbutt were sworn as Premier and Deputy Premier respectively by the Governor of New South Wales Professor Marie Bashir AC. The rest of the ministry was sworn in on 8 September 2008 at Government House by the Lieutenant Governor, James Spigelman AC.

== Composition of ministry ==
This ministry was announced on 8 September 2008. Just three days later Matt Brown resigned, causing a minor reshuffle. (Note: Matt Brown resigned on 11 September 2008. He was replaced as Minister for Police by Tony Kelly and by David Campbell as Minister for the Illawarra. Kelly's portfolio of Industrial Relations was transferred to John Hatzistergos.) Tony Stewart was dismissed on 11 November 2008. (Note: Tony Stewart was stood aside on 4 November 2008 following allegations that Stewart had verbally and physically harassed a staff member before being dismissed by Premier Rees on 11 November 2008. His portfolios of Science and Medical Research Small Business and assisting the Minister for Health (Cancer) were reassigned to Jodi McKay.) There was a minor rearrangement in January 2009. (Note: On 23 January 2009 Graham West was appointed to the new role of assisting the Premier on Veteran's Affairs.) (Note: John Robertson was promoted to the ministry on 30 January 2009, appointed to the new portfolios of Public Sector Reform, Special Minister of State and Corrective Services, partly replacing the abolished portfolio of Minister for Justice.) (Note: On 30 January 2009 Steve Whan was promoted to the ministry, replacing Jodi McKay in the portfolio of Small Business and Tony Kelly in the portfolio of Emergency Services. Kelly replaced Phil Costa in the portfolio of Rural Affairs.) John Della Bosca resigned from the ministry on 31 August 2009, (Note: John Della Bosca resigned from the ministry on 31 August 2009 following the public revelation of a 6-month extra-marital affair. His responsibilities were initially reassigned to John Hatzistergos.) prompting a reshuffle in which Rees punished those who had plotted against him as leader. (Note: On 14 September 2009 Carmel Tebbutt was appointed to the portfolio of Health and was replaced in Climate Change and the Environment by John Robertson and in Commerce by Jodi McKay.) (Note: On 14 September 2009 Nathan Rees replaced John Hatzistergos in the portfolio of the Central Coast.) (Note: Tony Kelly was replaced as Minister for Police by Michael Daley and Daley's portfolio of Roads was abolished.) (Note: On 14 September 2009 Verity Firth was replaced as Minister for Women by Linda Burney.) (Note: On 14 September 2009 John Robertson replaced Ian Macdonald as Minister for Energy.) (Note: Steve Whan replaced Tony Kelly as Minister for Rural Affairs.) (Note: David Borger was given the new role of Minister assisting the Minister for Transport.) (Note: On 14 September 2009 Barbara Perry replaced Jodi McKay in the role of Assisting the Minister for Health in relation to Cancer.) In November 2009 the Labor state conference gave Rees the power to choose his own cabinet and he responded by sacking Joe Tripodi and Ian Macdonald. (Note: On 17 November 2009 Joe Tripodi was replaced in the portfolio of Finance by Michael Daley, in Infrastructure by Kristina Keneally, in Regulatory Reform by Peter Primrose and in Ports and Waterways by Paul McLeay.) (Note: On 17 November 2009 Ian Macdonald was replaced in the portfolio of Primary Industries by Tony Kelly, in Mineral Resources by Peter Primrose and in State Development by Eric Roozendaal.) 17 days later a Labor caucus revolt saw Kristina Keneally succeeded Rees as Premier.

Portfolio	Minister	Party	Term commence	Term end	Term of office
Premier	Nathan Rees	Labor	5 September 2008	4 December 2009	1 year, 90 days
Minister for the Arts	Nathan Rees	Labor	8 September 2008	4 December 2009	1 year, 87 days
Deputy Premier	Carmel Tebbutt	Labor	5 September 2008	4 December 2009	1 year, 90 days
Minister for Climate Change and Environment	Carmel Tebbutt	Labor	8 September 2008	14 September 2009	1 year, 87 days
Minister for Climate Change and Environment	John Robertson, MLC	Labor	14 September 2009	4 December 2009	81 days
Minister for Commerce	Carmel Tebbutt	Labor	8 September 2008	14 September 2009	1 year, 6 days
Minister for Commerce	Jodi McKay	Labor	14 September 2009	4 December 2009	81 days
Minister for Health	John Della Bosca MLC	Labor	8 September 2008	1 September 2009	358 days
Minister for Health	John Hatzistergos, MLC	Labor	1 September 2009	14 September 2009	13 days
Minister for Health	Carmel Tebbutt	Labor	14 September 2009	4 December 2009	81 days
Minister for the Central Coast	John Della Bosca MLC	Labor	8 September 2008	1 September 2009	358 days
Minister for the Central Coast	John Hatzistergos, MLC	Labor	1 September 2009	14 September 2009	13 days
Minister for the Central Coast	Nathan Rees	Labor	14 September 2009	4 December 2009	81 days
Vice-President of the Executive Council; Leader of the Government in Legislative Council	John Della Bosca MLC	Labor	8 September 2008	1 September 2009	358 days
Vice-President of the Executive Council; Leader of the Government in Legislative Council	John Hatzistergos, MLC	Labor	1 September 2009	4 December 2009	94 days
Attorney-General	John Hatzistergos, MLC	Labor	8 September 2008	4 December 2009	1 year, 87 days
Minister for Justice	John Hatzistergos, MLC	Labor	8 September 2008	30 January 2009	144 days
Treasurer	Eric Roozendaal, MLC	Labor	8 September 2008	4 December 2009	1 year, 87 days
Minister for Transport	David Campbell	Labor	8 September 2008	4 December 2009	1 year, 87 days
Minister for Education and Training	Verity Firth	Labor	8 September 2008	4 December 2009	1 year, 87 days
Minister for Women	Verity Firth	Labor	8 September 2008	14 September 2009	1 year, 6 days
Minister for Women	Linda Burney	Labor	14 September 2009	4 December 2009	81 days
Minister for Planning	Kristina Keneally	Labor	8 September 2008	4 December 2009	1 year, 87 days
Minister for Redfern Waterloo	Kristina Keneally	Labor	8 September 2008	4 December 2009	1 year, 87 days
Minister for the Illawarra	Matt Brown	Labor	8 September 2008	11 September 2008	3 days
Minister for the Illawarra	David Campbell	Labor	11 September 2008	4 December 2009	1 year, 84 days
Minister for Police	Matt Brown	Labor	8 September 2008	11 September 2008	3 days
Minister for Police	Tony Kelly, MLC	Labor	11 September 2008	14 September 2009	1 year, 3 days
Minister for Police	Michael Daley	Labor	14 September 2009	4 December 2009	81 days
Minister for Finance	Joe Tripodi	Labor	8 September 2008	17 November 2009	1 year, 70 days
Minister for Finance	Michael Daley	Labor	17 November 2009	4 December 2009	17 days
Minister for Infrastructure	Joe Tripodi	Labor	8 September 2008	17 November 2009	1 year, 70 days
Minister for Infrastructure	Kristina Keneally	Labor	17 November 2009	4 December 2009	17 days
Minister for Regulatory Reform	Joe Tripodi (Note: Retained portfolio from the second Iemma ministry.)	Labor	8 September 2008	17 November 2009	1 year, 70 days
Minister for Regulatory Reform	Peter Primrose, MLC	Labor	17 November 2009	4 December 2009	17 days
Minister for Ports and Waterways	Joe Tripodi	Labor	8 September 2008	17 November 2009	1 year, 70 days
Minister for Ports and Waterways	Paul McLeay	Labor	17 November 2009	4 December 2009	17 days
Minister for Primary Industries	Ian Macdonald, MLC	Labor	8 September 2008	17 November 2009	1 year, 70 days
Minister for Primary Industries	Tony Kelly, MLC	Labor	17 November 2009	4 December 2009	17 days
Minister for Energy	Ian Macdonald, MLC	Labor	8 September 2008	14 September 2009	1 year, 6 days
Minister for Energy	John Robertson, MLC	Labor	14 September 2009	4 December 2009	81 days
Minister for Mineral Resources	Ian Macdonald, MLC	Labor	8 September 2008	17 November 2009	1 year, 70 days
Minister for Mineral Resources	Peter Primrose, MLC	Labor	17 November 2009	4 December 2009	17 days
Minister for State Development	Ian Macdonald, MLC	Labor	8 September 2008	17 November 2009	1 year, 70 days
Minister for State Development	Eric Roozendaal, MLC	Labor	17 November 2009	4 December 2009	17 days
Minister for Industrial Relations	Tony Kelly, MLC	Labor	8 September 2008	11 September 2008	3 days
Minister for Industrial Relations	John Hatzistergos, MLC	Labor	11 September 2008	4 December 2009	1 year, 84 days
Minister for Emergency Services	Tony Kelly, MLC	Labor	8 September 2008	30 January 2009	144 days
Minister for Emergency Services	Steve Whan	Labor	30 January 2009	4 December 2009	308 days
Minister for Lands	Tony Kelly, MLC	Labor	8 September 2008	4 December 2009	1 year, 87 days
Minister for Community Services	Linda Burney	Labor	8 September 2008	4 December 2009	1 year, 87 days
Minister for Gaming and Racing	Kevin Greene	Labor	8 September 2008	4 December 2009	1 year, 87 days
Minister for Sport and Recreation	Kevin Greene	Labor	8 September 2008	4 December 2009	1 year, 87 days
Minister for Ageing	Paul Lynch	Labor	8 September 2008	4 December 2009	1 year, 87 days
Minister for Disability Services	Paul Lynch	Labor	8 September 2008	4 December 2009	1 year, 87 days
Minister for Aboriginal Affairs	Paul Lynch	Labor	8 September 2008	4 December 2009	1 year, 87 days
Minister for Local Government	Barbara Perry	Labor	8 September 2008	4 December 2009	1 year, 87 days
Minister Assisting the Minister for Health (Mental Health)	Barbara Perry	Labor	8 September 2008	14 September 2009	1 year, 6 days
Minister Assisting the Minister for Health (Mental Health and Cancer)	Barbara Perry	Labor	14 September 2009	4 December 2009	81 days
Minister for Juvenile Justice	Graham West	Labor	8 September 2008	4 December 2009	64 days
Minister for Volunteering	Graham West	Labor	8 September 2008	4 December 2009	1 year, 87 days
Minister for Youth	Graham West	Labor	8 September 2008	4 December 2009	1 year, 87 days
Minister Assisting the Premier on Veteran's Affairs	Graham West	Labor	23 January 2009	4 December 2009	315 days
Minister for Roads	Michael Daley	Labor	8 September 2008	14 September 2009	1 year, 6 days
Minister for Water	Phil Costa	Labor	8 September 2008	4 December 2009	1 year, 87 days
Minister for Regional Development	Phil Costa	Labor	8 September 2008	4 December 2009	1 year, 87 days
Minister for Rural Affairs	Phil Costa	Labor	8 September 2008	30 January 2009	144 days
Minister for Rural Affairs	Tony Kelly, MLC	Labor	30 January 2009	14 September 2009	227 days
Minister for Rural Affairs	Steve Whan	Labor	14 September 2009	4 December 2009	81 days
Minister for Fair Trading	Virginia Judge	Labor	8 September 2008	4 December 2009	1 year, 87 days
Minister for Citizenship	Virginia Judge	Labor	8 September 2008	4 December 2009	1 year, 87 days
Minister Assisting the Premier on the Arts	Virginia Judge	Labor	8 September 2008	4 December 2009	1 year, 87 days
Minister for Housing	David Borger	Labor	8 September 2008	4 December 2009	1 year, 87 days
Minister for Western Sydney	David Borger	Labor	8 September 2008	4 December 2009	1 year, 87 days
Minister assisting the Minister for Transport	David Borger	Labor	14 September 2009	4 December 2009	81 days
Minister for Science and Medical Research	Tony Stewart	Labor	8 September 2008	11 November 2008	64 days
Minister for Science and Medical Research	Jodi McKay	Labor	11 November 2008	4 December 2009	1 year, 23 days
Minister Assisting the Minister for Health (Cancer)	Tony Stewart	Labor	8 September 2008	11 November 2008	64 days
Minister Assisting the Minister for Health (Cancer)	Jodi McKay	Labor	11 November 2008	14 September 2009	307 days
Minister for Small Business	Tony Stewart	Labor	8 September 2008	11 November 2008	64 days
Minister for Small Business	Jodi McKay	Labor	11 November 2008	30 January 2009	80 days
Minister for Small Business	Steve Whan	Labor	30 January 2009	4 December 2009	308 days
Minister for Tourism	Jodi McKay	Labor	8 September 2008	4 December 2009	1 year, 87 days
Minister for the Hunter	Jodi McKay	Labor	8 September 2008	4 December 2009	1 year, 87 days
Minister for Corrective Services	John Robertson, MLC	Labor	30 January 2009	4 December 2009	308 days
Minister for Public Sector Reform	John Robertson, MLC	Labor	30 January 2009	4 December 2009	308 days
Special Minister of State	John Robertson, MLC	Labor	30 January 2009	4 December 2009	308 days

Ministers are members of the Legislative Assembly unless otherwise noted.

== See also ==
- Members of the New South Wales Legislative Assembly, 2007-2011
- Members of the New South Wales Legislative Council, 2007-2011

== Notes ==
New South Wales government ministries
Preceded by Second Iemma ministry 2007–2008	Rees ministry 2008–2009	Succeeded by Keneally ministry 2009–2011
