= Keneally ministry =

92nd New South Wales government, led by Kristina Keneally

- 92nd Cabinet of New South Wales

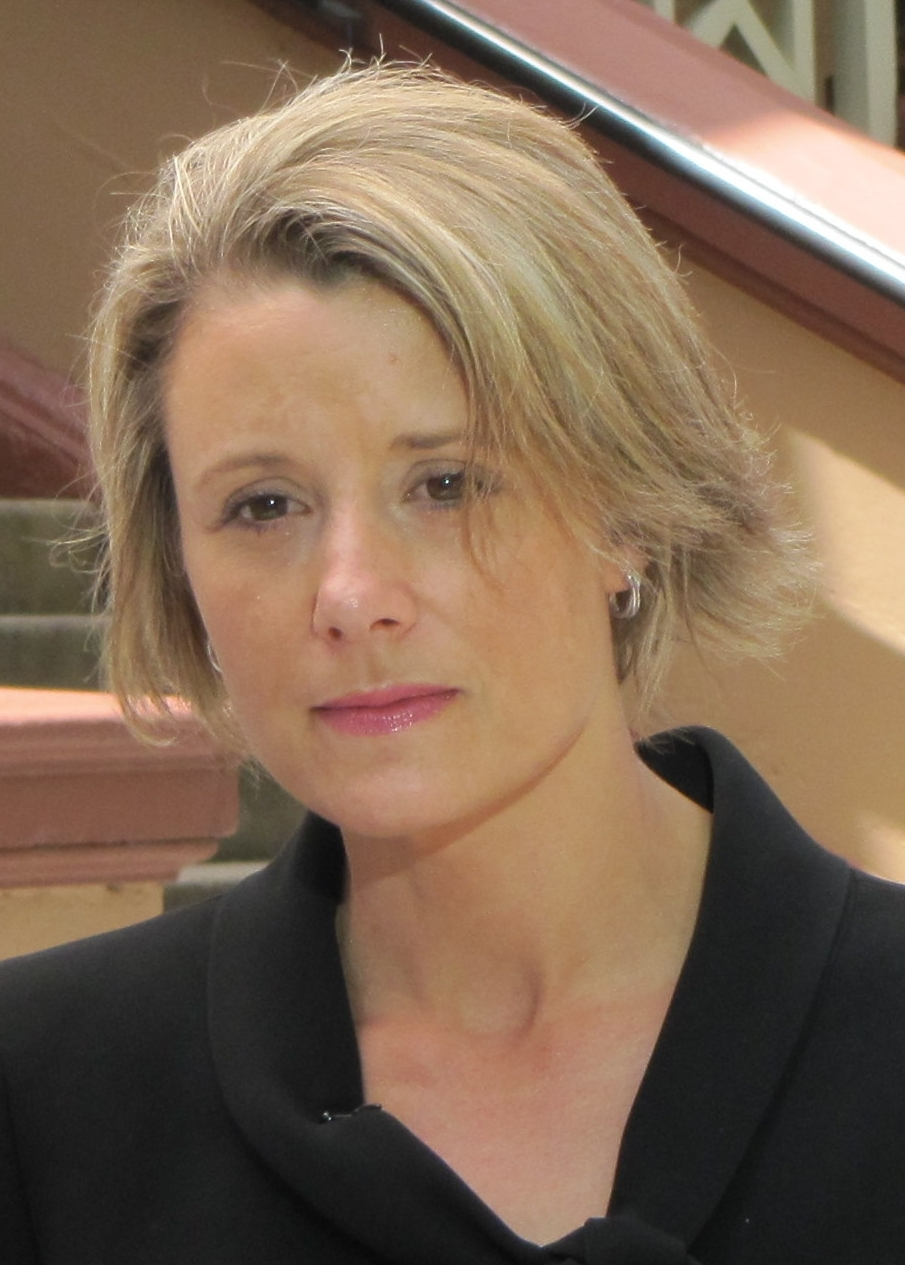
- Premier Kristina Keneally, pictured in 2009
- Date formed: 4 December 2009
- Date dissolved: 28 March 2011

People and organisations
- Monarch: Queen Elizabeth II
- Governor: Marie Bashir
- Premier: Kristina Keneally
- Deputy Premier: Carmel Tebbutt
- No. of ministers: 20
- Member party: Labor
- Status in legislature: Labor Majority Government
- Opposition party: Liberal–National Coalition
- Opposition leader: Barry O'Farrell

History
- Outgoing election: 2011 New South Wales state election
- Predecessor: Rees ministry
- Successor: O'Farrell ministry

The Keneally ministry is the 92nd ministry of the Government of New South Wales, and was led by the 42nd Premier Kristina Keneally.

The ministry was formed following a caucus motion to elect a new Leader of the Australian Labor Party in New South Wales, where Keneally defeated her party colleague, the 41st Premier, Nathan Rees. Keneally led the first two-woman executive (Premier and Deputy Premier) in Australian history.

The ministry was sworn in on 8 December 2009 at Government House by the Governor of New South Wales Marie Bashir. A few days earlier, on 4 December 2009, Keneally and her Deputy, Carmel Tebbutt were sworn in by the Governor, as Premier and Deputy Premier respectively at a ceremony also held at Government House.

This ministry covers the period from 4 December 2009 until 28 March 2011 when the 2011 state election was held, resulting in the loss of Labor to the Coalition; with the O'Farrell ministry gaining government.

== Composition of ministry ==
The composition of the ministry was announced by Premier Keneally on 8 December 2009. The first reshuffle in May 2010 was triggered by the resignation of David Campbell. (Note: On 20 May 2010 David Campbell resigned from the Ministry on 20 May 2010 citing personal reasons. His portfolio was split into Transport which was assigned to John Robertson and Roads which was assigned to assistant minister David Borger.) (Note: Paul Lynch replaced John Robertson in his portfolios of Industrial Relations, Commerce, Energy and Public Sector Reform.) (Note: Peter Primrose replaced Paul Lynch in his portfolios of Ageing and Disability Services.) (Note: Frank Terenzini was promoted to the ministry to replace David Borger in his portfolio of Housing and Peter Primrose in his portfolios of Small Business and assisting the Premier on Veteran's Affairs.) In June 2010 Graham West resigned citing family reasons (Note: On 4 June 2010 Graham West, citing family reasons, resigned from the ministry and announced his intention to not contest the 2011 state election. Barbara Perry replaced him as Minister for Juvenile Justice) and Ian Macdonald resigned after admitting to "errors" in his travel allowance. (Note: Ian Macdonald resigned from both the ministry and from Parliament after admitting that public funds had been misused on a trip to Italy and Dubai. His portfolios were divided between Eric Roozendaal (State and Regional Development), John Robertson (Central Coast), Kevin Greene (Major Events) and Paul McLeay (Mineral and Forest Resources).) In September 2010 Paul McLeay resigned. (Note: Paul McLeay resigned from the ministry on 1 September 2010 after he disclosed to the Premier that he used a parliamentary computer to access gambling and adult websites. His portfolios of Ports and Waterways and the Illawarra were assigned to Eric Roozendaal; whilst Steve Whan was assigned Mineral and Forest Resources.)

Ministry was dissolved on 28 March 2011, following its defeat at the 2011 state election.

| Portfolio | Minister | Party | Term commence | Term end | Term of office |
|---|---|---|---|---|---|
| Premier | Kristina Keneally | Labor | 4 December 2009 | 28 March 2011 | 1 year, 114 days |
| Minister for Redfern-Waterloo (Note: Retained portfolio from the Rees ministry.) | Kristina Keneally | Labor | 4 December 2009 | 28 March 2011 | 1 year, 114 days |
| Deputy Premier | Carmel Tebbutt | Labor | 4 December 2009 | 28 March 2011 | 1 year, 114 days |
| Minister for Health | Carmel Tebbutt | Labor | 4 December 2009 | 28 March 2011 | 1 year, 114 days |
| Attorney General | John Hatzistergos, MLC | Labor | 8 December 2009 | 28 March 2011 | 1 year, 110 days |
| Minister for Citizenship | John Hatzistergos, MLC | Labor | 8 December 2009 | 28 March 2011 | 1 year, 110 days |
| Minister for Regulatory Reform | John Hatzistergos, MLC | Labor | 8 December 2009 | 28 March 2011 | 1 year, 110 days |
| Vice-President of the Executive Council; Leader of the Government in Legislative Council | John Hatzistergos, MLC | Labor | 8 December 2009 | 28 March 2011 | 1 year, 110 days |
| Treasurer | Eric Roozendaal, MLC | Labor | 6 December 2009 | 28 March 2011 | 1 year, 112 days |
| Special Minister of State | Eric Roozendaal, MLC | Labor | 6 December 2009 | 28 March 2011 | 1 year, 112 days |
| Minister for Transport and Roads | David Campbell | Labor | 8 December 2009 | 20 May 2010 | 163 days |
| Minister for Transport | John Robertson, MLC | Labor | 21 May 2010 | 28 March 2011 | 311 days |
| Minister for Roads | David Borger | Labor | 21 May 2010 | 28 March 2011 | 311 days |
| Minister for Education and Training | Verity Firth | Labor | 8 December 2009 | 28 March 2011 | 1 year, 110 days |
| Minister for Planning | Tony Kelly, MLC | Labor | 8 December 2009 | 28 March 2011 | 1 year, 110 days |
| Minister for Infrastructure | Tony Kelly, MLC | Labor | 8 December 2009 | 28 March 2011 | 1 year, 110 days |
| Minister for Lands | Tony Kelly, MLC | Labor | 8 December 2009 | 28 March 2011 | 1 year, 110 days |
| Minister for Climate Change and Environment | Frank Sartor | Labor | 8 December 2009 | 28 March 2011 | 1 year, 110 days |
| Minister Assisting the Minister for Health (Cancer) | Frank Sartor | Labor | 8 December 2009 | 28 March 2011 | 1 year, 110 days |
| Minister for the State Plan | Linda Burney | Labor | 8 December 2009 | 28 March 2011 | 1 year, 110 days |
| Minister for Community Services | Linda Burney | Labor | 8 December 2009 | 28 March 2011 | 1 year, 110 days |
| Minister for Police | Michael Daley | Labor | 8 December 2009 | 28 March 2011 | 1 year, 110 days |
| Minister for Finance | Michael Daley | Labor | 8 December 2009 | 28 March 2011 | 1 year, 110 days |
| Minister for Industrial Relations | John Robertson, MLC | Labor | 8 December 2009 | 21 May 2010 | 164 days |
| Minister for Industrial Relations | Paul Lynch | Labor | 21 May 2010 | 28 March 2011 | 311 days |
| Minister for Commerce | John Robertson, MLC | Labor | 8 December 2009 | 21 May 2010 | 164 days |
| Minister for Commerce | Paul Lynch | Labor | 21 May 2010 | 28 March 2011 | 311 days |
| Minister for Energy | John Robertson, MLC | Labor | 8 December 2009 | 21 May 2010 | 164 days |
| Minister for Energy | Paul Lynch | Labor | 21 May 2010 | 28 March 2011 | 311 days |
| Minister for Public Sector Reform | John Robertson, MLC | Labor | 8 December 2009 | 21 May 2010 | 164 days |
| Minister for Public Sector Reform | Paul Lynch | Labor | 21 May 2010 | 28 March 2011 | 311 days |
| Minister for State and Regional Development | Ian Macdonald, MLC | Labor | 8 December 2009 | 4 June 2010 | 178 days |
| Minister for State and Regional Development | Eric Roozendaal, MLC | Labor | 5 June 2010 | 28 March 2011 | 296 days |
| Minister for Mineral and Forest Resources | Ian Macdonald, MLC | Labor | 8 December 2009 | 4 June 2010 | 178 days |
| Minister for Mineral and Forest Resources | Paul McLeay | Labor | 5 June 2010 | 1 September 2010 | 88 days |
| Minister for Mineral and Forest Resources | Steve Whan | Labor | 6 September 2010 | 28 March 2011 | 203 days |
| Minister for the Central Coast | Ian Macdonald, MLC | Labor | 8 December 2009 | 4 June 2010 | 178 days |
| Minister for the Central Coast | John Robertson, MLC | Labor | 5 June 2010 | 28 March 2011 | 296 days |
| Minister for Major Events | Ian Macdonald, MLC | Labor | 8 December 2009 | 4 June 2010 | 178 days |
| Minister for Major Events | Kevin Greene | Labor | 5 June 2010 | 28 March 2011 | 296 days |
| Minister for Ageing | Paul Lynch | Labor | 8 December 2009 | 21 May 2010 | 164 days |
| Minister for Ageing | Peter Primrose, MLC | Labor | 21 May 2010 | 28 March 2011 | 311 days |
| Minister for Disability Services | Paul Lynch | Labor | 8 December 2009 | 21 May 2010 | 164 days |
| Minister for Disability Services | Peter Primrose, MLC | Labor | 21 May 2010 | 28 March 2011 | 311 days |
| Minister for Aboriginal Affairs | Paul Lynch | Labor | 8 December 2009 | 28 March 2011 | 1 year, 110 days |
| Minister for Primary Industries | Steve Whan | Labor | 8 December 2009 | 28 March 2011 | 1 year, 110 days |
| Minister for Emergency Services | Steve Whan | Labor | 8 December 2009 | 28 March 2011 | 1 year, 110 days |
| Minister for Rural Affairs | Steve Whan | Labor | 8 December 2009 | 28 March 2011 | 1 year, 110 days |
| Minister for Tourism | Jodi McKay | Labor | 8 December 2009 | 28 March 2011 | 1 year, 110 days |
| Minister for the Hunter | Jodi McKay | Labor | 8 December 2009 | 28 March 2011 | 1 year, 110 days |
| Minister for Science and Medical Research | Jodi McKay | Labor | 8 December 2009 | 28 March 2011 | 1 year, 110 days |
| Minister for Women | Jodi McKay | Labor | 8 December 2009 | 28 March 2011 | 1 year, 110 days |
| Minister for Western Sydney | David Borger | Labor | 8 December 2009 | 28 March 2011 | 1 year, 110 days |
| Minister for Housing | David Borger | Labor | 8 December 2009 | 21 May 2010 | 164 days |
| Minister for Housing | Frank Terenzini | Labor | 21 May 2010 | 28 March 2011 | 311 days |
| Minister assisting the Minister for Transport and Roads | David Borger | Labor | 8 December 2009 | 21 May 2010 | 164 days |
| Minister for Local Government | Barbara Perry | Labor | 8 December 2009 | 28 March 2011 | 1 year, 110 days |
| Minister Assisting the Minister for Planning | Barbara Perry | Labor | 8 December 2009 | 28 March 2011 | 1 year, 110 days |
| Minister Assisting the Minister for Health (Mental Health) | Barbara Perry | Labor | 8 December 2009 | 28 March 2011 | 1 year, 110 days |
| Minister for Water | Phil Costa | Labor | 8 December 2009 | 28 March 2011 | 1 year, 110 days |
| Minister for Corrective Services | Phil Costa | Labor | 8 December 2009 | 28 March 2011 | 1 year, 110 days |
| Minister for Gaming and Racing | Kevin Greene | Labor | 8 December 2009 | 28 March 2011 | 1 year, 110 days |
| Minister for Sport and Recreation | Kevin Greene | Labor | 8 December 2009 | 28 March 2011 | 1 year, 110 days |
| Minister for Fair Trading | Virginia Judge | Labor | 8 December 2009 | 28 March 2011 | 1 year, 110 days |
| Minister for the Arts | Virginia Judge | Labor | 8 December 2009 | 28 March 2011 | 1 year, 110 days |
| Minister for Juvenile Justice | Graham West | Labor | 8 December 2009 | 4 June 2010 | 178 days |
| Minister for Juvenile Justice | Barbara Perry | Labor | 5 June 2010 | 28 March 2011 | 296 days |
| Minister for Ports and Waterways | Paul McLeay | Labor | 8 December 2009 | 1 September 2010 | 267 days |
| Minister for Ports and Waterways | Eric Roozendaal, MLC | Labor | 6 September 2010 | 28 March 2011 | 203 days |
| Minister for the Illawarra | Paul McLeay | Labor | 8 December 2009 | 1 September 2010 | 267 days |
| Minister for the Illawarra | Eric Roozendaal, MLC | Labor | 6 September 2010 | 28 March 2011 | 203 days |
| Minister for Small Business | Peter Primrose, MLC | Labor | 8 December 2009 | 21 May 2010 | 164 days |
| Minister for Small Business | Frank Terenzini | Labor | 21 May 2010 | 28 March 2011 | 311 days |
| Minister for Volunteering | Peter Primrose, MLC | Labor | 8 December 2009 | 28 March 2011 | 1 year, 110 days |
| Minister for Youth | Peter Primrose, MLC | Labor | 8 December 2009 | 28 March 2011 | 1 year, 110 days |
| Minister Assisting the Premier on Veteran's Affairs | Peter Primrose, MLC | Labor | 8 December 2009 | 21 May 2010 | 164 days |
| Minister Assisting the Premier on Veteran's Affairs | Frank Terenzini | Labor | 21 May 2010 | 28 March 2011 | 311 days |

Ministers are members of the Legislative Assembly unless otherwise noted.

== See also ==
- Members of the New South Wales Legislative Assembly, 2007-2011
- Members of the New South Wales Legislative Council, 2007-2011

== Notes ==
New South Wales government ministries
| Preceded by Rees ministry | Keneally ministry 2009–2011 | Succeeded by O'Farrell ministry |
