= Minister for Building =

Government minister in New South Wales, Australia

- Incumbent; Anoulack Chanthivong since 5 April 2023
- Department of Transport
- Style: The Honourable
- Appointer: Governor of New South Wales
- Inaugural holder: Claude Matthews (as the Minister for Building Materials)
- Formation: 19 May 1947

The Minister for Building is a minister in the Government of New South Wales with responsibility for building across New South Wales, Australia.

== History ==
=== Building Materials ===
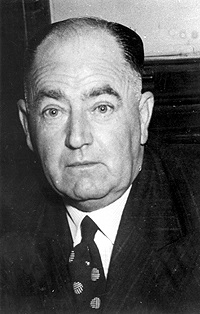
Inaugural Building Materials minister, Claude Matthews

During World War II building controls had been exercised by the Commonwealth government. A secondary industries section had been established in the Premier's department in 1944 with responsibility for developing manufacturing industries and in 1945 transferred to the Department of Labour and Industry. The functions of the section were to keep the Department informed about development and decentralisation of secondary industries, to provide information, advice and assistance to those contemplating the establishment of new industries or the expansion and technical development existing industries in NSW. The Section was responsible for the development and progressive implementation of various plans for industrial development, contact with overseas industries, negotiation for the establishment of factories in Australia, and movement towards the more rational and economic grouping of inter-related industries. The Division worked co-operatively with Commonwealth and other NSW agencies concerned with the development and decentralisation of secondary industries, and maintained contact with manufacturers for the purposes of information exchange, fostering expansion and efficiency, and encouraging maximum employment.

With post war reconstruction, control over building materials returned to the state governments. Controls continued to be necessary in the post-war environment to ensure that State planning priorities (including the demands of population growth) were achieved and scarce resources were allocated equitably. The controls introduced by the Building Operations and Building Materials Control Act 1946, included requiring consent for building operations except those exempted under the Act; preventing architects, builders, contractors and engineers from commencing buildings which were unauthorised, and requiring them to conform to any conditions placed on the building authorisation. Local Government powers to approve building applications were subject to the Act. Consent was required to use bricks except for purposes defined by the Act. Restrictions were placed on the supply of a range of other building materials. Inspectors could visit building sites and places where building materials were manufactured, stored, sold or distributed and require the production of relevant records. This was initially administered by the Building Materials Branch of the Department of Labour and Industry and timber distribution staff of the Forestry Commission. In June 1947 these staff were transferred to the new department of building materials. A technical branch was established to stimulate and develop the various activities allied to the building industry, and to ensure the training of skilled tradesmen to enable the State's housing program to be achieved. The branch also controlled all building materials such as bricks, cement products, and timber. The various branches which had combined to create the Department were operationally restricted to coastal districts while the new department's responsibilities covered the entire State. Bricks for example were not permitted to be used for the construction of fences or garages.

The principal responsibility of the Minister was the development, availability, production and standard of building materials particularly bricks, tiles and baths. It was established in the second McGirr ministry in May 1947, carved out of the responsibilities of the Minister for Labour and Industry. Additional responsibility for the encouragement and regulation of manufacturing, referred to as secondary industries, were added in November 1947 and the title of the portfolio was amended to reflect the additional responsibilities in March 1948.

On 4 November, 1947 the secondary industries division was transferred from the Premier's department to the Department of Building Materials in order to achieve co-ordination between industrial and housing development. Despite the additional responsibilities, the portfolio remained named Building Materials until June 1950 when it was renamed Minister for Secondary Industries and Minister for Building Materials.

On 15 August 1952 William Dickson resigned from the ministry and was elected President of the Legislative Council. The portfolio was abolished, with responsibility for secondary industries returning to the Premier, while building materials returned to the responsibility of the Minister for Labour and Industry. Manufacturing was next represented at a portfolio level as Minister for Industrial Development and Decentralisation.

=== Infrastructure ===
Infrastructure was first represented at a portfolio level in the fourth Carr ministry, combined with Planning. The minister, Craig Knowles, also held the portfolio of Natural Resources and was responsible for the Department of Infrastructure, Planning and Natural Resources. The government's stated purpose in establishing a combined department was:

1. to form one department for the purpose of making integrated decisions about natural resource management and land use planning; that is to bring the social, economic and environmental agendas together to promote sustainability;
2. improve service delivery and provide clear, concise and co-ordinated information to customers;
3. to simplify policy and regulation to resolve confusion and duplication;
4. to reduce costs and redirect savings back to the community;
5. to link decisions about vital infrastructure with the broader plans for NSW; and
6. to devolve decision making to the communities that those decisions affect.

Infrastructure was established as a separate portfolio in the first Iemma ministry, however it was not responsible for a department nor legislation The portfolio was combined with planning in the O'Farrell ministry before being split into separate portfolios in the first Baird ministry. The portfolio was then combined with Transport in the second Baird ministry, before being abolished in the second Berejiklian ministry, subsumed into Transport.

The portfolio was recreated in the second Perrottet ministry. In that ministry from December 2021 to March 2023, the minister was responsible for Barangaroo and Infrastructure NSW. It was one of the six ministries in the transport sector and the Minister (for Infrastructure, Cities and Active Transport) works with the Minister for Transport, the Minister for Metropolitan Roads and the Minister for Regional Transport and Roads. Together they administered the portfolio through the Department of Transport (Transport for NSW) and a range of other government agencies that coordinate funding arrangements for transport operators, including hundreds of local and community transport operators.

== List of ministers ==
Ministerial title	Minister	Party	Ministry	Term start	Term end	Time in office	Notes
Minister for Public Works	Arthur Griffith	Labor	McGowen; Holman (1)	21 October 1910	15 March 1915	4 years, 145 days	
Minister for Public Works	John Cann	Labor	Holman (1)	15 March 1915	15 November 1916	1 year, 245 days	
Minister for Building Materials	Claude Matthews	Labor	McGirr (2)	19 May 1947	9 March 1948	295 days	
Minister for Building Materials	William Dickson	Labor	McGirr (2)	9 March 1948	30 June 1950	2 years, 113 days	
Minister for Secondary Industries; Minister for Building Materials	William Dickson	Labor	McGirr (3); Cahill (1)	30 June 1950	15 August 1952	2 years, 46 days	
Minister for Public Works	Norm Ryan	Labor	Cahill (4); Heffron (1) (2); Renshaw	1 April 1959	13 May 1965	6 years, 42 days	
Minister for Public Works	Davis Hughes	Country	Askin (1) (2) (3) (4)	13 May 1965	17 January 1973	7 years, 249 days	
Minister for Public Works	Leon Punch	Country	Askin (5) (6); Lewis (1) (2)	17 January 1973	14 May 1976	3 years, 118 days	
Minister for Public Works	Jack Ferguson	Labor	Wran (1) (2) (3) (4)	14 May 1976	10 February 1984	7 years, 272 days	
Minister for Public Works	Laurie Brereton	Labor	Wran (5) (6) (7)	10 February 1984	6 February 1986	1 year, 361 days	
Minister for Public Works and Ports	Laurie Brereton	Labor	Wran (8); Unsworth	6 February 1986	26 November 1987	1 year, 293 days	
Minister for Public Works	Peter Cox	Labor	Unsworth	26 November 1987	21 March 1988	116 days	
Minister for Public Works	Wal Murray	National	Greiner (1) (2); Fahey (1) (2)	21 March 1988	26 May 1993	5 years, 66 days	
Minister for Public Works	Ian Armstrong	National	Fahey (3)	26 May 1993	4 April 1995	1 year, 313 days	
Minister for Public Works and Services	Michael Knight	Labor	Carr (1)	4 April 1995	15 December 1995	255 days	
Minister for Public Works and Services	Carl Scully	Labor	Carr (1)	15 December 1995	1 December 1997	1 year, 351 days	
Minister for Public Works and Services	Ron Dyer	Labor	Carr (2)	1 December 1997	8 April 1999	1 year, 128 days	
Minister for Public Works and Services	Morris Iemma	Labor	Carr (3)	8 April 1999	2 April 2003	3 years, 359 days	
Minister for Infrastructure and Planning	Craig Knowles	Labor	Carr (4)	2 April 2003	3 August 2005	2 years, 123 days	
Minister for Infrastructure	Michael Costa	Labor	Iemma (1)	3 August 2005	5 September 2008	3 years, 33 days	
Minister for Infrastructure	Joe Tripodi	Labor	Iemma (2)	8 September 2008	17 November 2009	1 year, 70 days	
Minister for Infrastructure	Kristina Keneally	Labor	Rees	17 November 2009	4 December 2009	17 days	
Minister for Infrastructure	Tony Kelly	Labor	Keneally	8 December 2009	28 March 2011	1 year, 110 days	
Minister for Planning and Infrastructure; Minister Assisting the Premier on Infrastructure NSW	Brad Hazzard	Liberal	O'Farrell	3 April 2011	23 April 2014	3 years, 20 days	
Minister for Infrastructure	Mike Baird	Liberal	Baird (1)	23 April 2014	2 April 2015	344 days	
Minister for Transport and Infrastructure	Andrew Constance	Liberal	Baird (2); Berejiklian (1)	2 April 2015	2 April 2019	4 years, 0 days	
Minister for Infrastructure	Rob Stokes	Liberal	Perrottet (2)	21 December 2021	28 March 2023	1 year, 97 days	
Minister for Building	Anoulack Chanthivong	Labor	Minns	5 April 2023	incumbent	3 years, 155 days	

== See also ==
- List of New South Wales government agencies
