= Minister for Medical Research (New South Wales) =

Government minister in New South Wales, Australia

- Incumbent; David Harris since 5 April 2023
- Style: The Honourable
- Nominator: Premier of New South Wales
- Appointer: Governor of New South Wales
- Inaugural holder: Frank Sartor (as the Minister for Science and Medical Research)
- Formation: 2 April 2003

The Minister for Medical Research is a minister in the New South Wales Government and has responsibilities which included medical research in New South Wales, Australia.

== History ==
The New South Wales government was involved in medical research since 1871 with the establishment of the position of Analytical Chemist. The NSW Medical Research Council was established on 18 September 1946 with objectives that included (1) carrying out a survey of medical research being conducted; (2) advising the government as to the expenditure of money upon medical research and the merits of reputed cures or methods of treatment. The Council however ceased to operate within a year of its establishment.

Medical Research was not represented at a portfolio level until 2003 with the creation of the portfolio of Science and Medical Research. The issues within the portfolio included gene technology; prohibition of human cloning and regulation of research on human embryos; access to Australia’s genetic and biochemical resources; bioethics; and spinal cord injury. The portfolio was combined with the Health portfolio in 2019 in the second Berejiklian ministry, named Health and Medical Research. The portfolio returned to Health in the second Perrottet ministry.

== List of ministers ==
Title	Minister	Party	Ministry	Term start	Term end	Time in office	Notes
Minister for Science and Medical Research	Frank Sartor	Labor	Carr (4); Iemma (1)	2 April 2003	2 April 2007	4 years, 0 days	
Minister for Science and Medical Research	Verity Firth	Labor	Iemma (2)	2 April 2007	5 September 2008	1 year, 159 days	
Minister for Science and Medical Research	Tony Stewart	Labor	Rees	8 September 2008	4 November 2008	57 days	
Minister for Science and Medical Research	Jodi McKay	Labor	Rees; Keneally	4 November 2008	28 March 2011	2 years, 144 days	
Minister for Medical Research	Jillian Skinner (Note: Concurrently held the Health portfolio.)	Liberal	O'Farrell; Baird (1)	3 April 2011	2 April 2015	3 years, 364 days	
Minister for Medical Research	Pru Goward	Liberal	Baird (2)	2 April 2015	30 January 2017	1 year, 303 days	
Minister for Medical Research	Brad Hazzard	Liberal	Berejiklian (1)	30 January 2017	23 March 2019	4 years, 325 days	
Minister for Health and Medical Research	Brad Hazzard	Liberal	Berejiklian (2); Perrottet (1)	2 April 2019	21 December 2021	4 years, 325 days	
Minister for Medical Research	David Harris	Labor	Minns	5 April 2023	incumbent	3 years, 155 days	

== See also ==
- List of New South Wales government agencies
- Minister for Medical Research (Victoria)
