= Minister for Finance (New South Wales) =

Australian politician

- Incumbent; Courtney Houssos since 5 April 2023
- Treasury; Department of Customer Service
- Style: The Honourable
- Nominator: Premier of New South Wales
- Appointer: Governor of New South Wales
- Inaugural holder: Max Ruddock (as the Minister for Revenue)
- Formation: 3 January 1975

The New South Wales Minister for Finance is a minister of the New South Wales Government within Treasury and the Department of Customer Service and has responsibilities for matters relating to revenue collection policy and regulation in the state of New South Wales, Australia.

The minister is supported by the Minister for Small Business who has responsibilities for matters relating to small business policy and regulation in New South Wales.

The minister administers the portfolio and supports the Treasurer of New South Wales, through Treasury, Revenue NSW, and associated government agencies.

Ultimately the minister is responsible to the Parliament of New South Wales.

== List of ministers ==
=== Finance ===
Ministerial title	Minister	Party	Ministry	Term start	Term end	Time in office	Notes
Minister for Revenue	Max Ruddock	Liberal	Lewis (1)	3 January 1975	10 October 1975	280 days	
Minister for Revenue	Peter Coleman	Liberal	Lewis (2)	10 October 1975	23 January 1976	105 days	
Minister for Revenue	Max Ruddock	Liberal	Willis	23 January 1976	14 May 1976	112 days	
Minister for Finance	Terry Sheahan	Labor	Wran (5)	1 February 1983	10 February 1984	1 year, 9 days	
Minister for Finance	Rodney Cavalier	Labor	Wran (6)	10 February 1984	5 April 1984	55 days	
Minister for Finance	Bob Debus	Labor	Wran (7)	5 April 1984	25 March 1988	3 years, 355 days	
Minister for Finance	George Souris	National	Fahey (3)	14 July 1992	26 May 1993	316 days	
Minister for Finance	Michael Costa	Labor	Iemma (1)	3 August 2005	17 February 2006	198 days	
Minister for Finance	John Della Bosca	Labor	Iemma (1)	17 February 2006	2 April 2007	1 year, 44 days	
Minister for Finance	John Watkins	Labor	Iemma (2)	2 April 2007	8 September 2008	1 year, 159 days	
Minister for Finance	Joe Tripodi	Labor	Rees	8 September 2008	17 November 2009	1 year, 70 days	
Minister for Finance	Michael Daley	Labor	Rees; Keneally	17 November 2009	28 March 2011	1 year, 131 days	
Minister for Finance and Services	Greg Pearce	Liberal	O'Farrell	3 April 2011	1 August 2013	2 years, 120 days	
Minister for Finance and Services	Andrew Constance	Liberal	O'Farrell	1 August 2013	23 April 2014	265 days	
Minister for Finance and Services	Dominic Perrottet	Liberal	Baird (1)	23 April 2014	2 April 2015	2 years, 282 days	
Minister for Finance, Services and Property	Dominic Perrottet	Liberal	Baird (2)	2 April 2015	30 January 2017	2 years, 282 days	
Minister for Finance, Services and Property	Victor Dominello	Liberal	Berejiklian (1)	30 January 2017	23 February 2019	2 years, 24 days	
Minister for Finance and Small Business	Damien Tudehope	Liberal	Berejiklian (2); Perrottet (1)	2 April 2019	21 December 2021	3 years, 327 days	
Minister for Finance	Damien Tudehope	Liberal	Perrottet (2)	21 December 2021	23 February 2023	3 years, 327 days	
Minister for Finance	Dominic Perrottet	Liberal	Perrottet (2)	23 February 2023	28 March 2023	33 days	
Minister for Finance	Courtney Houssos	Labor	Minns	3 April 2023	present	3 years, 229 days	

== Related ministerial titles ==
=== Commerce ===
Ministerial title	Minister	Party	Ministry	Term start	Term end	Time in office	Notes
Minister for Commerce	John Della Bosca	Labor	Carr (4); Iemma (1)	2 April 2003	2 April 2007	4 years, 0 days	
Minister for Commerce	Eric Roozendaal	Labor	Iemma (2)	2 April 2007	5 September 2008	1 year, 156 days	
Minister for Commerce	Carmel Tebbutt	Labor	Rees	8 September 2008	14 September 2009	1 year, 6 days	
Minister for Commerce	Jodi McKay	Labor	Rees	14 September 2009	4 December 2009	81 days	
Minister for Commerce	John Robertson	Labor	Keneally	8 December 2009	21 May 2010	164 days	
Minister for Commerce	Paul Lynch	Labor	Keneally	21 May 2010	28 March 2011	311 days	

=== Assistant treasurers ===
Minister	Party	Title	Term start	Term end	Time in office	Notes
William Dick	Liberal Reform	Minister without portfolio assisting the Treasurer	29 August 1904	1 October 1907	3 years, 33 days	
Henry Hoyle	Labor	Minister without portfolio assisting the Treasurer	29 January 1914	31 October 1916	2 years, 276 days	
Bill McKell	Labor	Assistant Colonial Treasurer	17 June 1925	7 June 1927	1 year, 355 days	
Robert Cruickshank	Labor	Assistant Colonial Treasurer	19 September 1927	18 October 1927	29 days	
Bertram Stevens	Nationalist	Assistant Colonial Treasurer	18 October 1927	15 April 1929	1 year, 179 days	
Eric Spooner	United Australia	Assistant Treasurer	15 February 1933	21 August 1935	2 years, 187 days	
Clive Evatt	Labor	Assistant Treasurer	19 May 1947	23 February 1953	5 years, 280 days	
George Freudenstein	Country	Assistant Treasurer	11 March 1971	19 June 1972	1 year, 100 days	
Wal Fife	Liberal	Assistant Treasurer	19 June 1972	3 January 1975	2 years, 198 days	
Max Ruddock	Liberal	Assistant Treasurer	3 January 1975	10 October 1975	280 days	
Peter Coleman	Liberal	Assistant Treasurer	10 October 1975	23 January 1976	105 days	
Max Ruddock	Liberal	Assistant Treasurer	23 January 1976	14 May 1976	112 days	
Ken Booth	Labor	Assistant Treasurer	29 February 1980	2 October 1981	1 year, 216 days	
Phillip Smiles	Liberal	Assistant Treasurer	1 February 1991	1 February 1992	1 year, 0 days	
George Souris	National	Assistant Treasurer	3 July 1992	26 May 1993	327 days	
John Della Bosca	Labor	Assistant Treasurer	8 April 1999	17 February 2006	6 years, 315 days	

=== Assistant minister ===
Ministerial title	Minister	Party	Ministry	Term start	Term end	Time in office	Notes
Minister Assisting the Minister for Commerce	Reba Meagher	Labor	Carr (4)	2 April 2003	21 January 2005	1 year, 294 days	
Minister Assisting the Minister for Commerce	John Hatzistergos	Labor	Carr (4)	1 February 2005	3 August 2005	183 days	
Minister Assisting the Minister for Commerce	Diane Beamer	Labor	Iemma (1)	3 August 2005	2 April 2007	1 year, 242 days	
Minister Assisting the Minister for Finance	John Della Bosca	Labor	Iemma (2); Rees	2 April 2007	1 September 2009	1 year, 72 days	

== See also ==
- List of New South Wales government agencies
- Ministry of Finance
- Minister for Finance (Australia)
- Minister for Finance (Victoria)
