= Minister for Ports and Waterways (New South Wales) =

Government minister in New South Wales, Australia

Minister for Ports and Waterways of New South Wales

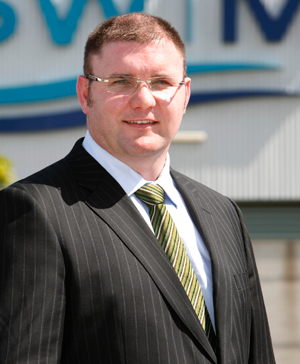
- Minister Paul McLeay (2009–2010)
- Appointer: Governor of New South Wales
- Precursor: Minister for Public Works
- Formation: 3 January 1975
- First holder: Leon Punch
- Final holder: Eric Roozendaal
- Abolished: 28 March 2011

The Minister for Ports was a ministry first established in 1975 in the Coalition Lewis–Cutler ministry and abolished in 2011. It has had three incarnations and was renamed as the Minister for Ports and Waterways in the First Iemma ministry in 2005. In 2011 the portfolio was merged with that of Roads to form the portfolio of Roads and Ports.

== Role and responsibilities ==
Ports had previously been a responsibility of the Minister for Public Works and both portfolios were held by the same minister for the first nine years until 1984. The Minister was responsible for the investigation, planning, design, construction and maintenance of port facilities (except fishing, tourist and recreational facilities), port operation and vessel operations. By 1979 the minister’s responsibilities were drawn together in the Maritime Services Board. From the seventh Wran ministry in 1984 until the Unsworth ministry in 1987 the responsibility for ports was combined with the portfolio for public works. The Minister was responsible for the co-ordination of two major organisations and various statutory bodies, administered via numerous Acts, including the Public Works Act, 1912 , Maritime Services Act, 1935, Navigation Act, 1901 , Sydney Harbour Trust Act, 1900 and New Darling Harbour Act, 1984. Other legislation covered water supply administration; land acquisition; engineering and ship building; construction materials production, supply and distribution (bricks, tiles); prevention of pollution within ports; wharfage and tonnage rates. The main agencies administered by the portfolio were the Department of Public Works and Maritime Services Board. Statutory bodies included the Board of Architects of NSW; Light, Heat and Power Committee; State Dockyard; various port advisory committees, water supply boards and drainage unions/trusts. The portfolio ceased when Laurie Brereton resigned on 26 November 1987. Public Works became a separate portfolio and the Minister for Transport took on the responsibility for Ports.

Ports became a separate Ministry again in the third Fahey ministry. The minister took responsibility for the Maritime Services Board (later the various Waterways Authorities) and a number of statutory bodies. The portfolio was abolished in the third Carr ministry and absorbed by Transport.

The portfolio of Ports had a third incarnation following a re-shuffle of the fourth Carr ministry in 2005 and the title was changed to Ports and Waterways in the First Iemma ministry in August 2005. The portfolio was abolished in the O'Farrell ministry in 2011 when it was combined with Roads to form the portfolio of Roads and Ports.

== List of ministers ==
Title	Minister	Party	Ministry	Term start	Term end	Time in office	Notes
Minister for Ports; Minister for Public Works	Leon Punch	Country	Lewis (1) (2)	3 January 1975	14 May 1976	1 year, 132 days	
Minister for Ports; Minister for Public Works	Jack Ferguson	Labor	Wran (1) (2) (3) (4)	14 May 1976	10 February 1984	7 years, 272 days	
Minister for Ports	Lin Gordon	Labor	Wran (5) (6)	10 February 1984	5 April 1984	55 days	
Minister for Public Works and Ports	Laurie Brereton	Labor	Wran (7) (8); Unsworth	5 April 1984	26 November 1987	3 years, 235 days	
Minister for Ports	Ian Armstrong	National	Fahey (3)	26 May 1993	4 April 1995	1 year, 313 days	
Minister for Ports	Carl Scully	Labor	Carr (1)	4 April 1995	1 December 1997	2 years, 241 days	
Minister for Ports	Kim Yeadon	Labor	Carr (2)	1 December 1997	8 April 1999	1 year, 128 days	
Minister for Ports	Michael Costa	Labor	Carr (4)	21 January 2005	3 August 2005	194 days	
Minister for Ports and Waterways	Michael Costa	Labor	Iemma (1)	3 August 2005	10 August 2005	7 days	
Minister for Ports and Waterways	Eric Roozendaal	Labor	Iemma (1)	10 August 2005	17 February 2006	191 days	
Minister for Ports and Waterways	Joe Tripodi	Labor	Iemma (1) (2); Rees	17 February 2006	17 November 2009	3 years, 273 days	
Minister for Ports and Waterways	Paul McLeay	Labor	Rees; Keneally	8 December 2009	1 September 2010	267 days	
Minister for Ports and Waterways	Eric Roozendaal	Labor	Keneally	6 September 2010	28 March 2011	203 days	
Minister for Roads and Ports	Duncan Gay	National	O'Farrell	4 April 2011	23 April 2014	3 years, 19 days	
