= Eric Roozendaal =

Australian politician

The Honourable Eric Roozendaal

Treasurer of New South Wales
- In office 8 September 2008 – 28 March 2011
- Premier: Nathan Rees; Kristina Keneally
- Preceded by: Michael Costa
- Succeeded by: Mike Baird

Member of Legislative Council of New South Wales
- In office 24 June 2004 – 9 May 2013
- Preceded by: Tony Burke
- Succeeded by: Ernest Wong

Personal details
- Born: 16 March 1962 (age 64) Sydney
- Party: Australian Labor Party (New South Wales Branch) (suspended in 2012); Independent (2012–2013)
- Education: University of New South Wales, Macquarie University

Eric Michael Roozendaal (born 16 March 1962) is a former Australian politician who served as a member of the New South Wales Legislative Council, serving between 2004 and 2013. He is a former General Secretary of the Labor Party. Roozendaal was the Treasurer of New South Wales, Minister of State and Regional Development, Minister of Ports and Waterways, Minister for the Illawarra, and Special Minister of State in the Rees and Keneally governments.

== Early career ==
Roozendaal was born in Sydney. His family is of Dutch-Jewish descent, his grandfather perishing in Auschwitz during the Holocaust. He studied commerce at the University of Sydney, but did not complete the course. He would later graduate from Macquarie University with a Bachelor of Arts and subsequently a Bachelor of Laws from the University of New South Wales. He became an organiser for the New South Wales branch of the Australian Labor Party in 1987, Assistant general secretary in 1995 and general secretary in 1999. This made him the organisation head of the dominant Labor Right faction of the party's largest state branch, a powerful position. He was also a member of the National Executive of the Party.

Roozendaal was campaign director for Premier Bob Carr's successful election campaign in 2003. He was also the party's chief fund-raiser, raising a reported A$16.3 million in his four years as general secretary. He also carried out a crackdown on branch stacking and insisted on the selection of more female candidates in safe Labor seats.

During 2003, Roozendaal was criticised by using internal party polling to destabilise Simon Crean, the then Leader of the Opposition. Roozendaal was also Labor's New South Wales campaign manager at the 2004 federal election.

== Political career ==
In 2004 Roozendaal was appointed to a vacancy in the Legislative Council, succeeding Tony Burke following Burke's election to the Australian House of Representatives. Roozendaal was immediately appointed chair of the Standing Committee on State Development, and then in August 2005 he was appointed Minister for Ports and Waterways, and in February 2006 he was promoted to Minister for Roads. Following the 2007 election, Roozendaal was also appointed Minister for Commerce in addition to his Roads portfolio. As Roads Minister, Roozendaal was embarrassed for being caught illegally driving in a Sydney bus lane, and for dumping a promise to widen the problematic Spit Bridge just two months after the 2007 election. He was also against cyclists using roads during busy times, saying it was "not helpful" for cyclists to ride in peak-hour traffic. Roozendaal described himself as a "rev head", due to his love of V8 Supercars. He was an advocate for transforming Sydney Olympic Park into a V8 Supercar circuit.

Roozendaal was promoted to Treasurer by incoming Premier Nathan Rees, with immediate responsibilities for producing a 2008 mini-budget and maintaining the State's credit rating. In 2010, Roozendaal was accused of wasting taxpayers' money after he took two trips to New York at a cost of almost A$100,000. Roozendaal claimed the trips were designed to reinforce New South Wales' AAA credit rating through meetings with Moody's and Standard & Poor's, even though both companies had representatives in Australia that Roozendaal could have met with.

In 2010 and 2011, Roozendaal was criticised for the deal he brokered, as Treasurer, to privatise some of the NSW Government's electricity assets; namely the retail branches of Integral Energy and Country Energy that were sold to Origin Energy in December 2010. In December 2010 and January 2011, members of the NSW Legislative Council attempted to hold an inquiry into the sale. However, directors of the companies involved refused to attend hearings after the Parliament of New South Wales was prorogued with the effect that directors would not have the protection of parliamentary privilege while giving evidence. The sale, unpopular with Labor's affiliate Unions NSW, was criticised by various union leaders and several called for Roozendaal to be sacked. As a result of the sale, subsequent issues relating to the inquiry and additional concerns relating to wage negotiations for public servants, several union leaders called on the Labor Party to move Roozendaal to an un-winnable position on the Party's Legislative Council ticket for the NSW election in March 2011. In February 2011, Premier Kristina Keneally announced that plans to privatise other electricity assets had been cancelled but promised support for Roozendaal.

During 2012 and 2013, the Independent Commission Against Corruption (ICAC) investigated allegations of corruption involving Roozendaal and Eddie Obeid. A public inquiry heard allegations that Roozendaal was given an A$10,800 discount on a car. Roozendaal told the ICAC that Moses Obeid, a son of Eddie Obeid, helped facilitate the car purchase by introducing him to a car dealer, but that this was to secure a discount rather than an inappropriate benefit. The ICAC has suggested that the deal was "covered up" by various transfers of ownership. Roozendaal told the ICAC he had simply forgotten to transfer the registration to his wife's name. Opposition Leader John Robertson asked Labor's general secretary to suspend Roozendaal from the party until the ICAC released its findings. Following his appearance at the inquiry, in February 2013 Roozendaal announced that he would be separating from his wife of 15 years. He announced his resignation to the Legislative Council on 9 May 2013, in advance of his term that was due to expire in March 2019. and used his farewell speech to criticise Labor over the failure of power privatisation — an issue he said had dogged the labour movement for almost two decades. On 31 July 2013, ICAC cleared Roozendaal and Eddie Obeid of corruption over the motor vehicle transaction.

Parliament of New South Wales
Preceded by Tony Burke	Member of the New South Wales Legislative Council; 2004–2013	Succeeded by Ernest Wong
Political offices
Preceded by Michael Costa	Minister for Ports and Waterways; 2005–2006	Succeeded by Joe Tripodi
Preceded by Joe Tripodi	Minister for Roads; 2006–2008	Succeeded by Michael Daley
Vacant Title last held by Wendy Machin	Minister Assisting the Minister for Transport; 2006–2007	Portfolio abolished
Preceded by John Della Bosca	Minister for Commerce; 2007–2008	Succeeded by Carmel Tebbutt
Preceded by Michael Costa	Treasurer of New South Wales; 2008–2011	Succeeded by Mike Baird
Preceded by Ian Macdonald	Minister for State Development; 2009	Succeeded by Ian Macdonald as Minister for State and Regional Development
Preceded by John Robertson	Special Minister of State; 2009–2011	Succeeded by Chris Hartcher
Preceded by Ian Macdonald	Minister for State and Regional Development; 2010–2011	Succeeded by Andrew Stoner as Minister for Regional Infrastructure and Services
Preceded by Paul McLeay	Minister for Ports and Waterways; 2010–2011	Succeeded by Duncan Gay as Minister for Roads and Ports
Preceded by Paul McLeay	Minister for the Illawarra; 2010–2011	Succeeded by Greg Pearce
Party political offices
Preceded by John Della Bosca	General Secretary of the Australian Labor Party (NSW Branch); 1999–2004	Succeeded by Mark Arbib
