= Ian Macdonald (New South Wales politician) =

Australian politician (born 1949)

Member of Legislative Council of New South Wales
- In office 19 March 1988 – 7 June 2010
- Succeeded by: Luke Foley

Minister for Primary Industries
- In office 3 May 2004 – 17 November 2009
- Preceded by: Tony Kelly
- Succeeded by: Steve Whan

Minister for State and Regional Development
- In office 2 April 2007 – 5 June 2010
- Preceded by: David Campbell
- Succeeded by: Eric Roozendaal

Minister for Major Events
- In office 11 March 2010 – 5 June 2010
- Succeeded by: Kevin Greene

Minister for Mineral and Forest Resources
- In office 3 August 2005 – 5 June 2010
- Preceded by: Tony Kelly
- Succeeded by: Paul McLeay

Personal details
- Born: Ian Michael Macdonald; 7 March 1949 (age 77)
- Party: Labor Party (1972–2013)
- Education: La Trobe University

Ian Michael Macdonald (born 7 March 1949) is a former Australian politician and currently undergoing court proceedings and was a member of the New South Wales Legislative Council from 1988 to 2010 representing the Labor Party. Between 2003 and 2010, Macdonald held a range of ministerial responsibilities in the Carr, Iemma, Rees, and Keneally ministries. Macdonald, who joined the Labor Party in 1972, had his membership of the party terminated in 2013 for bringing the party into disrepute.

After the Independent Commission Against Corruption found that he acted in a corrupt manner, Macdonald was charged with the offence of misconduct in public office for corruptly issuing lucrative mining licences at Doyles Creek in the Hunter Valley, found guilty by a Supreme Court jury in March 2017, and sentenced in June 2017 for a period of ten years, with a minimum custodial period of seven years. Macdonald appealed against the verdict and, on 25 February 2019, his conviction was quashed by the NSW Court of Criminal Appeal who ordered a retrial. He was granted bail and released from custody on the same day. In July 2021 Macdonald was found guilty of misconduct in public office on separate charges relating to the granting of a lucrative coal-exploration licence over Cherrydale Park, in the Bylong Valley, owned by the family of Eddie Obeid.

== Early career and background ==
Raised as one of five children by his mother in a single parent household, Macdonald graduated from La Trobe University with a Bachelor of Arts (Honours) in history and worked for the Australian Council of Overseas Aid, and a range of Commonwealth and State government agencies before his election to parliament in 1988.

At the time of entering Parliament, he was a farmer near Carcoar in the Central West of New South Wales.

== Political career ==
Elected to the Legislative Council in 1988, Macdonald was appointed Minister for Agriculture and Fisheries in 2003 and then the Primary Industries portfolio and a range of other portfolios in the first and second Iemma and Rees ministries including Natural Resources, Mineral Resources, State Development, and Energy. However, granted extraordinary powers by Labor State Conference on 17 November 2009, Rees sacked Macdonald (along with others) from the ministry because of Macdonald's efforts to destabilise Rees in his position.

Macdonald then played a large part in the sacking of Rees in favour of Keneally. Macdonald was previously a member of the New South Wales Socialist Left faction, but was formally expelled in December 2009 for his role in Rees's downfall. Keneally restored Macdonald to the ministry following her election as Premier, making him the Minister for Major Events, Mineral and Forest Resources, State and Regional Development and Central Coast.

Macdonald was plagued by scandal surrounding a trip to Dubai made in 2008, which led him to resign from the ministry on 4 June 2010 on the same day as the resignation of Minister Graham West. Macdonald's Dubai trip was investigated by the Independent Commission Against Corruption (ICAC) after a government report found he misused public funds.

On 7 June 2010 Macdonald resigned from parliament with immediate effect. He was replaced by Luke Foley, the assistant general secretary of the New South Wales Labor Party.

In July 2012 Macdonald was suspended by the Australian Labor Party for "conduct contrary to the principles of the party". His membership was subsequently terminated in mid-2013 for bringing the party in disrepute.

=== ICAC inquiries into alleged corrupt behaviour ===
In November 2011 the ICAC commenced an inquiry that heard allegations that Macdonald, while Minister, accepted sexual favours in return for introducing businessman to executives of state-owned energy companies. It was also alleged that property developer Ron Medich acted as a broker for Macdonald and was seeking to do business with government agencies where Macdonald had influence as a minister. Appearing before the commission to give evidence in relation to the allegations, Macdonald claimed that he was under the influence of alcohol and suffering the effects of depression at the time of the alleged incident.

In November 2012, the ICAC began a series of investigative hearings relating to Macdonald and the property and mining interests of Eddie Obeid, a former Labor minister and "power broker". This inquiry concerned, among other issues, the circumstances surrounding a decision made in 2008 by Macdonald as the Minister for Primary Industries and Minister for Mineral Resources, to open a mining area in the Bylong Valley for coal exploration. These circumstances include whether Macdonald's decision was influenced by Obeid. The witnesses list for the inquiry included former NSW Premiers Morris Iemma and Nathan Rees.

On 31 July 2013 the commission found that Macdonald engaged in corrupt conduct by exercising his ministerial influence to arrange a meeting between Ron Medich and Country Energy managing director Craig Murray on 15 July 2009, and, prior to the meeting, by soliciting the services of a woman as a reward for arranging the meeting. The commission also found that Macdonald acted contrary to his public duty as a minister of the Crown by arranging for the creation of the Mount Penny tenement to benefit members of the Obeid family, and that he acted contrary to his public duty as a minister of the Crown by providing members of the Obeid family with confidential information that was to their benefit. Further, the commission found that Macdonald acted corruptly by deciding to reopen the expressions of interest process for mining exploration licences in order to favour Travers Duncan, and by providing him with confidential information. The commission recommended that the above matters be referred to the director of public prosecutions (DPP) with respect to prosecuting Macdonald. On reviewing the evidence before the commission of the financial benefits accrued to the Obeid family, the ICAC provided relevant information to the NSW Crime Commission for such action as it deems appropriate, and the ICAC also disseminated relevant information to the Australian Taxation Office for appropriate action. Macdonald vowed to launch a court challenge against the corruption findings made against him by the Independent Commission Against Corruption.

One month later, the ICAC made further findings that Macdonald engaged in corrupt conduct by acting contrary to his duty as a minister of the Crown in granting consent to Doyles Creek Mining Pty Ltd to apply for a coal exploration licence at Doyles Creek and by granting the exploration licence to the company, both grants being substantially for the purpose of benefiting John Maitland, a former official of the Construction, Forestry, Mining and Energy Union. The commission found that, but for that purpose, Macdonald would not have made those grants. In January 2014, the premier, Barry O'Farrell, announced that the Liberal/National government would introduce legislation into Parliament to cancel the exploration licences for Doyles Creek, Mount Penny and Glendon Brook. The commission also made findings of corrupt conduct by Obeid and his son, Moses Obeid, John Maitland, and others.

== Criminal charges and findings ==
Ian Macdonald
- Status: In prison
- Convictions: Conspiracy (July 2021)
- Penalty: 9 years and 6 months (5 years, 3 months non-parole period)
- Accomplices: Eddie Obeid; Moses Obeid

Details
- Imprisoned at: Lithgow Correctional Centre

In November 2014 the ICAC announced that Macdonald will be prosecuted by the DPP for the offence of misconduct in public office for corruptly issuing of lucrative mining licences at Doyles Creek in the Hunter Valley. Macdonald was also prosecuted "for two counts of being an accessory before the fact to misconduct in public office, in relation to aiding, abetting, counselling and procuring the commission of the two offences by Mr Macdonald"; and for giving false and misleading evidence to the ICAC.

In December 2015, the Supreme Court heard that Macdonald was unable to secure Legal Aid funding to pay for legal representation in his criminal trial. The Judge commented that a Dietrich application was a "potential collateral challenge to the trial date." It was estimated that Macdonald's defence legal costs would be between A$250,000 and A$1.5 million. In March 2017 a criminal trial before a Supreme Court jury found that Macdonald was guilty of misconduct in public office. Sentenced on 2 June, Macdonald is serving a ten-year sentence, of which seven years were without parole. Immediately following his sentencing, Macdonald's lawyers advised that he would appeal against his conviction. The NSW Court of Criminal Appeal handed down its findings on 25 February 2019 and quashed Macdonald and Maitland's convictions, ordering a retrial. Both men were released from custody on the same day and granted bail. In handing down its findings the Court found that:

.... [trial judge — Justice Christine Adamson] "misdirected" the jurors about the state of mind needed to be found guilty of wilful misconduct in public office. It follows, in our opinion, with the greatest respect to the trial judge, that the jury was not properly directed on the mental element of the offence.

— New South Wales Court of Criminal Appeal judgement, February 2019.

Prior to his sentencing, the NSW Parliament passed legislation to remove parliamentary pensions from former politicians convicted of serious criminal offences.

In late May 2017 Macdonald was also committed to stand trial on conspiracy charges with Obeid, and his son, Moses Obeid, relating to Macdonald's granting of a coal exploration licence involving the Mount Penny tenement; due to commence in March 2019. All three were tried before Justice Elizabeth Fullerton, and the trial commenced in early 2020 and concluded in February 2021. None of the accused gave evidence at their trial. Justice Fullerton handed down her verdict on 19 July, finding all three guilty. On 21 October, Macdonald was sentenced to nine years and six months, with a non-parole period of five years and three months, over his part in the conspiracy to gain a mining lease over the Obeid's family farm at Bylong. Macdonald, together with Obeid, have lodged an appeal against their conviction, claiming that Justice Fullerton made a number of errors of fact and reasoning when she found them guilty. Despite applying for bail, Macdonald is in custody with the appeal expected to be heard in September 2022, later delayed to April 2023.

Political offices
Preceded by Richard Amery	Minister for Agriculture; 2003–2004	Succeeded by himself as Minister for Primary Industries
Preceded by Eddie Obeid	Minister for Fisheries; 2003–2004	Succeeded by Steve Whan
Preceded by himself as Minister for Agriculture	Minister for Primary Industries; 2004–2009	Succeeded by Steve Whan
Preceded by Craig Knowles	Minister for Natural Resources; 2005–2007	Succeeded by himself as Minister for Mineral and Forest Resources
Preceded by Kerry Hickey	Minister for Mineral Resources; 2005–2009	Succeeded by himself as Minister for Mineral and Forest Resources
Preceded by Joe Tripodi	Minister for Energy; 2007–2009	Succeeded by John Robertson
Preceded by Morris Iemma	Minister for State Development; 2007–2009	Succeeded by himself as Minister for State and Regional Development
Preceded by himself as Minister for Mineral Resources and as Minister for Natural Resources	Minister for Mineral and Forest Resources; 2009–2010	Succeeded by Steve Whan
Preceded by himself as Minister for State Development	Minister for State and Regional Development; 2009–2010	Succeeded by Eric Roozendaal
Preceded by Nathan Rees	Minister for the Central Coast; 2009–2010	Succeeded by John Robertson
New portfolio	Minister for Major Events; 2010	Succeeded by Kevin Greene
