= John Della Bosca =

Australian politician

The Honourable John Della Bosca AM

Minister for Health
- In office 8 September 2008 – 31 August 2009
- Preceded by: Reba Meagher
- Succeeded by: Carmel Tebbutt

Minister for the Central Coast
- In office 2 April 2007 – 31 August 2009
- Preceded by: Grant McBride

Personal details
- Born: John Joseph Della Bosca; 18 July 1956 (age 70)
- Party: Australian Labor Party (New South Wales Branch)
- Spouse: Belinda Neal
- Children: 2 sons

John Joseph Della Bosca AM (Italian: [ˈdɛlla ˈboska]; born 18 July 1956) is an Australian former politician, representing the Labor Party in the New South Wales Legislative Council. From 1999 to 2009, Della Bosca served a range of ministerial portfolios, including Minister for Health and Minister for the Central Coast in the NSW State Government.

== Early life and career ==
Della Bosca attended school at De La Salle College, Cronulla. Influenced by a visit to his school by Bob Carr, Della Bosca joined the ALP in January 1973. He rose through his branch and electorate council to take a place on the party's National Executive. Between 1976 and his election to parliament in 1999, Della Bosca worked for the labour movement full-time in various capacities, first as a researcher for Senator Kerry Sibraa. In 1979, he took on the role of National Research Officer for the Australian Transport Officers' Federation, becoming the union's state organiser in 1981.

In 1983, Della Bosca became State Organiser for the ALP. In 1985, he was promoted to Assistant Secretary and in 1990 he attained the position of general secretary, a post he was to hold for nine years.

== Parliamentary career ==
In 1999, Della Bosca made his much-anticipated move into parliamentary politics as a candidate for the Legislative Council. Within a month of his election, Premier Bob Carr appointed him Special Minister of State. In 2000, he was set to become the ALP's next national president, but was forced to withdraw after he criticised then ALP leader Kim Beazley's GST rollback policy in an interview in the news magazine, The Bulletin.

Della Bosca's ministerial responsibilities were expanded following the 2003 election to include Commerce, Finance, Industrial Relations, Ageing and Disability Services. He was also appointed Leader of the Government in the Legislative Council. Following the 2007 election he was appointed Minister for Education and Training, Minister for Industrial Relations and Minister for the Central Coast. On 4 September 2007 Della Bosca stated "the NSW government strives to keep (TAFE) fees as low as possible". Despite this, he announced that course fees would be increasing by 6.5 per cent to 9 per cent.

In May 2008, Della Bosca revealed his probationary driver's licence had been revoked for a period of six months following multiple speeding offences. At the time of the ban Della Bosca was in charge of the Motor Accidents Authority. Later that month, he caused further controversy by swearing at a media photographer who photographed him cycling to work.

On 13 June 2008, Della Bosca was stood down from his position as Minister for Education and Training while police investigated an alleged altercation between Della Bosca and his wife Belinda Neal, who was the Labor Member for Robertson, and staff at Iguana Joe's waterfront bar and nightclub at Gosford. The nightclub issued an apology to Della Bosca, at least parts of which were reported to have been written by Della Bosca himself. The NSW Director of Public Prosecutions subsequently found that "there is insufficient evidence to support any criminal charge against NSW law". On his return to the ministry, Della Bosca was appointed Minister for Health and Minister for the Central Coast, with his former Education portfolio passing to Verity Firth.

On 31 August 2009, Della Bosca resigned from his ministries and as Government leader in the Legislative Council, following the public revelation of a 6-month sexual affair.

On 29 July 2010, Della Bosca announced that he was resigning from the New South Wales Legislative Council to become a campaign director for the National Disability and Carers Alliance (now National Disability Services), and assist in the establishment of a national disability insurance scheme.

Party political offices
| Preceded by Stephen Loosley | General Secretary of the Australian Labor Party (NSW Branch); 1990–1999 | Succeeded by Eric Roozendaal |
| Preceded by Michael Egan | Leader of the Labor Party in the Legislative Council; 2005–2009 | Succeeded by John Hatzistergos |
New South Wales Legislative Council
| Unknown | Member of the Legislative Council; 1999–2010 | Succeeded by Sophie Cotsis |
Political offices
| New title | Special Minister of State; 1999–2006 | Vacant Title next held by John Robertson |
| Vacant Title last held by George Souris | Assistant Treasurer of New South Wales; 1999–2006 | Post abolished |
| Vacant Title last held by Anne Cohen as Minister for Administrative Services | Minister Assisting the Premier on Public Sector Management; 2000–2006 | Vacant Title next held by John Robertson as Minister for Public Sector Reform |
| New title | Minister Assisting the Premier for the Central Coast; 2000–2003 | Succeeded by Himself as Minister for the Central Coast |
| Preceded by Jeff Shaw | Minister for Industrial Relations; 2000–2008 | Succeeded by Eric Roozendaal |
| Preceded by Himself as Minister Assisting the Premier for the Central Coast | Minister for the Central Coast; 2003–2005 | Succeeded by Grant McBride |
| New title | Minister for Commerce; 2003–2007 | Succeeded by Eric Roozendaal |
| Preceded by Carmel Tebbutt | Minister for Ageing; 2005–2007 | Succeeded by Kristina Keneally |
| Preceded by Carmel Tebbutt | Minister for Disability Service; 2005–2007 | Succeeded by Kristina Keneally |
| Preceded by Michael Egan | Leader of the Government in the Legislative Council; 2005–2009 | Succeeded by John Hatzistergos |
| Preceded by Michael Egan | Vice-President of the Executive Council; 2005–2007 | Succeeded by Tony Kelly |
| Preceded by Michael Costa | Minister for Finance; 2006–2007 | Succeeded by John Watkins |
| Preceded by Tony Kelly | Vice-President of the Executive Council; 2007–2009 | Succeeded by John Hatzistergos |
| Preceded by Carmel Tebbutt | Minister for Education and Training; 2007–2008 | Succeeded by Verity Firth |
| New title | Minister Assisting the Minister for Finance; 2007–2009 | Post abolished |
| Preceded by Grant McBride | Minister for the Central Coast; 2007–2009 | Succeeded by John Hatzistergos |
| Preceded by Reba Meagher | Minister for Health; 2008–2009 | Succeeded by Carmel Tebbutt |
