= Joe Tripodi =

Australian politician (born 1967)

Member of the New South Wales Legislative Assembly for Fairfield
- In office 25 March 1995 – 4 March 2011
- Preceded by: Geoff Irwin
- Succeeded by: Guy Zangari

Personal details
- Born: Joseph Guerino Tripodi; 25 November 1967 (age 58) Fairfield, New South Wales
- Party: Labor Party (1983–2014)
- Spouse: Maria Tripodi
- Education: University of Sydney
- Occupation: Economist and union organiser
- Website: NSW Parliament profile

Joseph Guerino Tripodi (Italian: [ɡweˈriːno triˈpɔːdi]; born 25 November 1967) is a former Australian politician. He was a member of the New South Wales Legislative Assembly representing the electorate of Fairfield for the Labor Party between 1995 and 2011. He was Minister for Finance, Infrastructure, Regulatory Reform, Ports and Waterways under former Premier Nathan Rees. A controversial figure during his time in politics, he declined to contest the 2011 state election and retired from public life in that year.

Tripodi's membership of the Labor Party was subsequently terminated in June 2014 after the NSW Independent Commission Against Corruption (ICAC) found that He had acted corruptly by deliberately failing to disclose to his Cabinet colleagues his awareness of the Obeid family's financial interests in Circular Quay leases. In 2016 ICAC made a second finding of corruption against Tripodi for leaking confidential Treasury information to benefit Nathan Tinkler's business interests, and recommended charges. In 2017 ICAC made a third finding of corruption against Tripodi for using his ministerial position to try to award a government water contract to benefit the Obeid family.

== Early career ==
Tripodi was born in 1967 and raised in Fairfield, a suburb in south-western Sydney, the eldest of four children to Italian migrants Angelo and Iolanda, receiving his early years of education at Westfields High School, West Fairfield. He graduated with a Bachelor of Economics (Hons) from the University of Sydney and became an economist with the Reserve Bank of Australia from 1989 to 1991. At age 16, Tripodi joined the Labor Party and served as State Secretary of NSW Young Labor, later becoming an official with the NSW Labor Council from 1993 to 1995.

== Political career ==
In 1995, Tripodi was elected to the New South Wales Legislative Assembly, representing the western Sydney electorate of Fairfield for Labor.

Prior to entering the ministry Tripodi was the Chairman of the Legislative Assembly Public Accounts Committee. He was the Minister for Housing from February to August 2005, when he became Minister for Roads. In September 2005, he was chased and grabbed on the floor of the Assembly by National Party member Andrew Fraser, apparently in relation to a road funding issue. In February 2006, he became Minister for Energy, Minister for Ports and Waterways and Minister Assisting the Treasurer on Business and Economic Regulatory Reform. In April 2007, he became Minister for Small Business, Regulatory Reform, Ports and Waterways.

In 2007, former premier Bob Carr was critical of Tripodi's performance as waterways minister with regard to his management of harbour development.

In 2009, it was reported that Tripodi had proposed electricity industry reform in NSW that would result in the three state-owned retailers being sold off to private enterprise and the sale of long-term "gentrader" contracts.

=== Factional boss ===
Along with Eddie Obeid, Tripodi was seen as a factional leader of a sub-faction known informally as "the Terrigals". He and Obeid have been held responsible for ending the hopes of loyal Terrigal Carl Scully of becoming NSW Premier in 2005 following the resignation of Bob Carr. Tripodi and Obeid reportedly walked into Scully's office and informed him that they had decided to support then Health Minister Morris Iemma instead. This has since been described as "one of the greatest acts of bastardry of all time". Iemma went on to become Premier and win the 2007 NSW elections; however, in 2008 Tripodi and Obeid withdrew their support for Iemma, forcing Iemma to resign from the NSW Premiership.

On 8 September 2008 Iemma's successor Nathan Rees promoted Tripodi to the Finance and Infrastructure portfolios, in addition to his previous responsibilities of Ports and Waterways, and Regulatory Reform. On 15 November 2009 Rees dumped Tripodi from the front bench for allegedly plotting to install former Health Minister John Della Bosca as Premier; Rees used new special powers granted to him at the NSW Labor Party State Conference the day before, which gave him authority to choose who serves on the Labor front bench instead of the State Parliamentary Labor Party. Soon afterwards, Tripodi enacted revenge on Rees by organising a petition calling for a special caucus meeting to enable a leadership challenge. This resulted in Rees on 3 December 2009 stating that "Should I not be Premier by the end of this day, let there be no doubt in the community's mind, no doubt, that any challenger will be a puppet of Eddie Obeid and Joe Tripodi". Rees that day subsequently lost the leadership and Premiership to Kristina Keneally.

=== Controversy ===
His career from early on until its end, was marked by a series of public allegations about impropriety and corruption. In October 2000, he was accused of sexually assaulting an Australian Democrats staffer at a New South Wales Parliament House function the month before. Tripodi denied wrongdoing, and the complainant later withdrew their statement to the NSW Police.

In 2001, the manager of a committee chaired by Tripodi took out an apprehended violence order (AVO) against the MP after he publicly opposed a development application by her husband for a tavern opposite a primary school in Tripodi's electorate. The AVO was withdrawn shortly afterward. Tripodi was also accused of branch stacking. In 1996, it was reported that he paid almost $7,000 in cash to the ALP head office to fund a "branch stack".

In 2005 Tripodi was named as a witness in the Orange Grove affair involving allegations of unlawful rejection of a development application for a proposed retail outlet in southwest Sydney. He was subsequently cleared of wrongdoing by the NSW Independent Commission Against Corruption.

Coalition campaign advertising ahead of the 2007 election identified Tripodi—along with Treasurer Michael Costa and Planning Minister Frank Sartor—as one of the government's least popular. Independent MPs indicated that, in the event of a hung parliament, they would not support a minority Labor government in which Tripodi remained a minister.

During an ICAC investigation into Wollongong City Council in 2008, it was revealed that a former Council officer against whom corruption allegations had been made was a personal friend of Tripodi's and had subsequently been appointed to a senior position in a department in his portfolio Tripodi responded that the appointment had been "at arm's length" from him, and on 3 March 2008 the ICAC indicated there was no evidence that would sustain an investigation.

=== Retirement from Parliament ===
Tripodi's announcement of his decision to not contest the March 2011 NSW election came as pressure was mounting from the Premier Kristina Keneally to "refresh and renew" Labor politics in NSW. Tripodi was the 15th Labor MP to announce their retirement since the last state election in 2007. Although denying that he was pushed, Keneally praised his contribution to government economic reform, especially in the areas of energy, housing and ports. There was significant media opinion that Tripodi's decision was a major victory for Labor's head office who saw him as a political liability.

Appearing on ABC's Stateline in November 2010 after announcing his retirement, Tripodi stated he regretted entering Parliament at a young age and if he had his time again he would enter politics at the age of 45 or 50.

=== Federal politics possibility ===
In 2009 it was reported that Tripodi had approached senior Labor officials in 2008 to seek advice about possible endorsement in the federal seat of Fowler at the 2010 election. In the same unconfirmed report, Karl Bitar, Labor's national secretary, advised Tripodi to get out of politics altogether due to the reputation from various scandals and from being viewed as a factional player and powerbroker. It was also reported that Kevin Rudd, Labor's Prime Minister at that time, would be highly reluctant to accept Tripodi in the federal Labor caucus. Tripodi denied the media report, describing it as "completely false".

== Findings of the Independent Commission Against Corruption ==
In October 2013, the NSW Independent Commission Against Corruption commenced investigative hearings surrounding allegations that, between 2000 and 2011, Eddie Obeid misused his position as a Member of Parliament to attempt to influence public officials to exercise their official functions with respect to retail leases at Circular Quay, without disclosing that Obeid, his family or a related entity had an interest in some of those leases. It was also alleged that during the same period, certain public officials improperly exercised their official functions, with respect to retail leases at Circular Quay, to benefit Obeid or his family. Further allegations were also made that alleged that Obeid had attempted to influence public officials to exercise their official functions with respect to the review and grant of water licences at a farm at Bylong in the Upper Hunter region, without disclosing that Obeid, his family or a related entity had an interest in the licences. Tripodi and former members of his staff were called as witnesses before the commission. On 6 November 2013, Tripodi requested that his membership of the Labor Party be suspended until such time as the Commission released its findings. The Commission handed down its findings in June 2014, and found that Tripodi engaged in corrupt conduct in 2007 by deliberately failing to disclose to his Cabinet colleagues his awareness of the Obeid family's financial interests in Circular Quay leases. While the ICAC did not recommend any charges be laid against Tripodi, NSW Labor terminated his membership of the Labor Party for bringing the party into disrepute.

In May 2014 in a separate matter before the NSW Independent Commission Against Corruption, junior counsel assisting the inquiry, Greg O'Mahoney, told former MP Jodi McKay that "we've got pretty good information" that the three people who distributed leaflets making damaging allegations about her throughout her electorate were: "the Tinkler group (Nathan Tinkler), Miss Anne Wills [an associate of Mr Tripodi and a consultant to Buildev] and Mr Joe Tripodi." In the Inquiry, it was alleged that the leaflets were distributed because McKay refused a bribe from Tinkler.

In 2016 ICAC made a second finding of corruption against Tripodi for leaking confidential Treasury information to benefit Nathan Tinkler's company Buildev, and recommended the Director of Public Prosecutions consider charging Tripodi with misconduct in public office. In 2017 ICAC found Tripodi engaged in "serious corrupt conduct" for using his ministerial position to try to award a lucrative government water contract which would have financially benefited the Obeid family, and again recommended charges of misconduct in public office.

As a state minister, Tripodi was entitled to use the honorific "The Honourable", even in his post-political career. Following findings of corrupt conduct against Tripodi and the announcement of the decision to commence criminal proceedings, at the request of Mike Baird, the Premier of New South Wales, the Department of Premier and Cabinet asked Tripodi to show cause why he should not lose the title of “honourable”. Tripodi chose not to respond and Baird recommended to Governor David Hurley that the honorific be removed; which was authorised with effect from December 2014.

New South Wales Legislative Assembly
Preceded by Geoff Irwin	Member for Fairfield; 1995 – 2011	Succeeded by Guy Zangari
Political offices
Preceded by Carl Scully	Minister for Housing; 2005	Succeeded by Cherie Burton
Preceded by Michael Costa	Minister for Roads; 2005–2006	Succeeded by Eric Roozendaal
Preceded by Carl Scully as Minister for Utilities	Minister for Energy; 2006–2007	Succeeded by Ian Macdonald
Preceded by Eric Roozendaal	Minister for Ports and Waterways; 2006–2009	Succeeded by Paul McLeay
Preceded by John Della Bosca as Assistant Treasurer	Minister Assisting the Treasurer on Business and Economic Regulatory Reform; 2006–2007	Succeeded by Peter Primrose as Minister for Regulatory Reform
Preceded by John Della Bosca as Assistant Treasurer	Minister for Regulatory Reform; 2007–2009	Succeeded by Peter Primrose as Minister for Regulatory Reform
Preceded by David Campbell	Minister for Small Business; 2007–2008	Succeeded by Tony Stewart
Preceded by John Watkins	Minister for Finance; 2008–2009	Succeeded by Michael Daley
Preceded by Michael Costa	Minister for Infrastructure; 2008–2009	Succeeded by Tony Kelly
