= Tony Kelly (politician) =

Australian former politician

The Honourable Tony Kelly ALGA
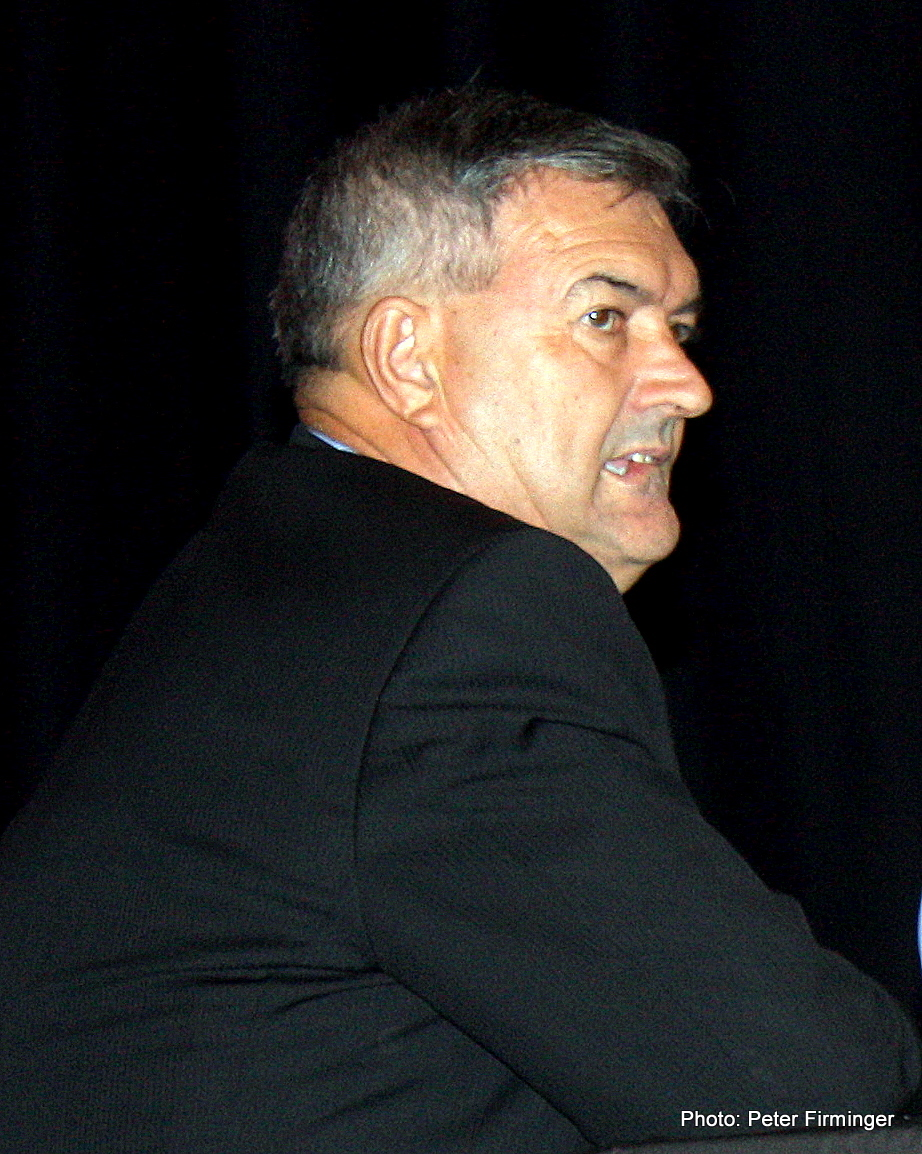

Member of the New South Wales Legislative Council
- In office 17 September 1997 – 6 June 2011
- Preceded by: Peter Watkins
- Succeeded by: Steve Whan

Minister for Planning
- In office 8 December 2009 – 28 March 2011
- Preceded by: Kristina Keneally
- Succeeded by: Brad Hazzard

Minister for Lands
- In office 3 June 2004 – 28 March 2011
- Preceded by: Richard Amery
- Succeeded by: Brad Hazzard

Minister for Infrastructure
- In office 8 December 2009 – 28 March 2011
- Preceded by: Joe Tripodi
- Succeeded by: Brad Hazzard

Personal details
- Born: Anthony Bernard Kelly; 25 August 1948 (age 78)
- Party: Australian Labor Party (circa 1975–2011)
- Spouse: Anne Kelly
- Children: 2 sons

Anthony Bernard Kelly (born 25 August 1948) is an Australian former politician, who was a member of the New South Wales Legislative Council representing the Australian Labor Party from 1997 until 2011.

Following an investigation by the Independent Commission Against Corruption in 2011, it was found that Kelly engaged in corrupt conduct during the government purchase of a beach property in northern Sydney. Kelly did not face criminal charges. The Director of Public Prosecutions decided that there was insufficient evidence to proceed with a prosecution for forgery and misconduct in public office.

== Early life and background ==
Kelly was educated at St Mary's Catholic School in Wellington, New South Wales, and at St Stanislaus' College in Bathurst, New South Wales. He undertook further studies in local government administration at Mitchell College of Advanced Education, now Charles Sturt University.

Kelly worked for 20 years with the Wellington Council, becoming general manager.

== Political career ==
Kelly entered the Legislative Council in September 1987 and served until the 1988 election, which his party lost. Kelly re-entered the Council in September 1997 and was re-elected at the 2003 and 2011 elections for eight-year terms; resigning from the council with immediate effect on 6 June 2011.

During his time in parliament, Kelly served as Minister Assisting the Minister for Natural Resources (Lands), 2003 to 2004; Minister for Local Government, 2003 to 2005; Minister for Emergency Services, 2003 to 2009; Minister for Rural Affairs, 2003 to 2008; Minister for Lands, 2004 to 2011; Minister Assisting the Minister for Natural Resources, 2005; Minister for Juvenile Justice, 2005 to 2008; Minister for Justice, 2005 to 2008; Minister for Police, 2008 to 2009; and Minister for Planning and Minister for Infrastructure, 2009 to 2011. He was Leader of the Government in the Legislative Council from 2003 to 2011.

== Unauthorised purchase of property at Currawong ==
=== ICAC Investigation ===
On 20 June 2011, the Independent Commission Against Corruption (ICAC) announced that it would hold a public inquiry into matters arising from the purchase of property at Currawong, Pittwater, by the NSW Government.

ICAC held a public inquiry over 11 days in June and July 2011. The ICAC Commissioner, David Ipp, presided at the public inquiry, at which 21 witnesses gave evidence. ICAC concluded its investigation in mid-December. In sum, ICAC found that Kelly engaged in corrupt conduct with respect to the purchase of the property by the NSW Government. The ICAC found that Kelly, as the then Minister for Lands, authorised the purchase even though he knew he was not authorised to do so, and that he backdated a letter to before the caretaker period of government commenced, knowing that it would be used by a public servant to falsely represent that written authority had been given to authorise the purchase. The allegations generated significant publicity. That public servant was the Director General of the Department of Lands, Warwick Watkins. On release of the findings, the Labor Party immediately moved to terminate Kelly's membership.

ICAC's key findings were as follows:

- Kelly and Watkins engaged in corrupt conduct in relation to a backdated letter that was used to claim authority for the purchase of property at Currawong.
- Kelly created the letter which was later used by himself, Watkins and the LPMA's then corporate secretary and chief financial officer, Robert Costello, to mislead public officials into believing the letter was genuine.
- Corrupt conduct was found against Costello.
- The four former Unions NSW properties at Currawong, Pittwater, were purchased by Watkins on behalf of the NSW Government from then owner, Eco Villages Australia Pty Limited. Contracts were exchanged for the $12.2-million purchase on 15 March 2011.
- Watkins was not authorized to commit the NSW Government to the purchase of the Currawong site.
- Watkins engaged in corrupt conduct by purchasing the land.

ICAC's opinion was that the matter be referred to the Director of Public Prosecutions with respect to the prosecution of Watkins, Kelly and Costello for various criminal offences.

Watkins claimed the letter to Kelly dated 25 February 2011 from the premier Kristina Keneally authorized the purchase of the site. However, ICAC found that the Premier's letter only authorized negotiations and did not authorize Watkins to purchase the site. ICAC reported that after the contract for purchase of the Currawong property was executed and exchanged on 15 March 2011. However, given the caretaker period of government when such actions are not to be undertaken, questions were soon raised within the government about whether the purchase was authorized. On 17 March 2011 the Director General of the Department of Premier and Cabinet NSW engaged the Internal Audit Bureau (IAB) to investigate Watkins' authority to purchase the site. The following day, the Director General stood Watkins down and met with Watkins where he was told that he had not been authorized to purchase the land. Subsequently, Watkins contacted Kelly and asked if he would sign a letter – backdating it – confirming their alleged understanding that Watkins was authorized to purchase the Currawong property. The effect of the backdating of the letter was to convey that authority was given on 28 February 2011, prior to the exchange of contracts. Thus, the provision of the backdated letter to the IAB investigator finding that Watkins was authorized to execute the contracts for the purchase of the site by Kelly.

=== Director of Public Prosecutions' advice ===
In December 2011, the DPP advised ICAC that there was insufficient evidence to support criminal charges against Kelly. ICAC accepted the DPP's advice. Thus, prosecution of Kelly did not proceed. The DPP also advised against prosecuting Costello. Arising from ICAC's investigation and DPP advice, it was only Watkins that would face criminal charges.

== Further corruption ==
In August 2017, Kelly, along with other former Labor ministers Eddie Obeid and Joe Tripodi, were found by ICAC to have prepared a "deceptive" cabinet minute to benefit the Obeid family. ICAC's Operation Credo, its investigation into Obeid-linked company Australian Water Holdings. ICAC found Tripodi was "doing Mr Obeid's bidding" in backing attempts by AWH to enter into a lucrative public-private partnership with the state government in 2010. ICAC reported that the Obeid family had a $3 million stake in AWH, despite their claims the money was advanced as a loan. ICAC recommended the DPP charge Kelly, Obeid, Tripodi and Gilbert Brown with misconduct while in public office, which is a criminal offence carrying a jail term, Brown was a senior member of Kelly's staff.

== See also ==
- First Iemma ministry
- Second Iemma ministry
- Rees ministry
- Keneally ministry

Political offices
Preceded by Harry Woods	Minister for Local Government; 2003–2005	Succeeded by Kerry Hickey
Preceded by Kristina Keneally	Minister for Planning; 2009–2011	Succeeded by Brad Hazzard as Minister for Planning and Infrastructure
New South Wales Legislative Council
Preceded by Duncan Gay	Chairman of Committees; 1999–2003	Succeeded by Amanda Fazio
