= Paul McLeay =

Australian politician

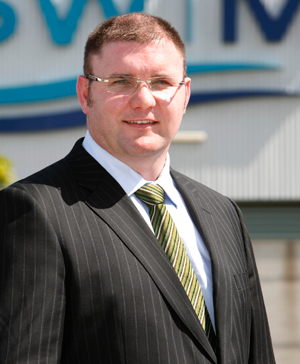

Member for Heathcote
- In office 22 March 2003 – 26 March 2011
- Preceded by: Ian McManus
- Succeeded by: Lee Evans

Minister for Ports and Waterways
- In office 17 November 2009 – 1 September 2010
- Preceded by: Joe Tripodi
- Succeeded by: Eric Roozendaal

Minister for Mineral and Forest Resources
- In office 5 June 2010 – 1 September 2010
- Preceded by: Ian Macdonald
- Succeeded by: Steve Whan

Minister for the Illawarra
- In office 8 December 2009 – 1 September 2010
- Preceded by: David Campbell
- Succeeded by: Eric Roozendaal

Personal details
- Born: 23 August 1972 (age 54) Sydney, New South Wales, Australia
- Party: Labor Party
- Spouse: Cassandra Wilkinson
- Children: 2
- Website: NSW Parliamentary website

Paul Edward McLeay (born 23 August 1972), a former Australian politician, was a member of the New South Wales Legislative Assembly representing the electorate of Heathcote for the Labor Party between 2003 and 2011.

In 2010, McLeay resigned his position as a Minister on 1 September 2010 after he admitted using a parliamentary computer to visit gambling websites. He was the fifth minister to resign from Kristina Keneally's Labor government.

== Early years and background ==
McLeay is the son of Janice McLeay, former Commissioner of the NSW Industrial Relations Commission, and Leo McLeay, a former Speaker of the Australian House of Representatives between 1989 and 1993.

He is married to Cassandra Wilkinson, author, past president of FBi Radio and senior public servant. They have two children. Prior to entering politics, McLeay held the position of Assistant General Secretary of the NSW Public Service Association.

== New South Wales parliamentary career ==
On entering Parliament, McLeay was appointed parliamentary Secretary to the Minister for Health and Chairman of the Public Accounts Committee. In 2009, he was appointed Minister for Ports and Waterways and Minister for the Illawarra. In June 2010, McLeay was appointed Minister for Mineral and Forest Resources. In September 2010, McLeay resigned as a Minister.

McLeay was a Director of Engadine District Youth Services and President of the Bundeena volunteer fire brigade.

New South Wales Legislative Assembly
Preceded by Ian McManus	Member for Heathcote; 2003 – 2011	Succeeded by Lee Evans
