= Michael Costa (politician) =

Australian politician

The Honourable Michael Costa MLC

60th Treasurer of New South Wales
- In office 17 February 2006 – 5 September 2008
- Premier: Morris Iemma
- Preceded by: Michael Egan
- Succeeded by: Eric Roozendaal

Minister for Finance
- In office 3 August 2005 – 17 February 2006
- Premier: Morris Iemma
- Preceded by: George Souris
- Succeeded by: John Watkins

Minister for Roads
- In office 21 January 2005 – 3 August 2005
- Premier: Bob Carr
- Preceded by: Carl Scully
- Succeeded by: Joe Tripodi

Minister for Ports
- In office 21 January 2005 – 3 August 2005
- Premier: Bob Carr
- Preceded by: Kim Yeadon
- Succeeded by: Eric Roozendaal

Minister for Transport Services
- In office 2 April 2003 – 21 January 2005
- Premier: Bob Carr
- Preceded by: Carl Scully
- Succeeded by: John Watkins

Minister for Police
- In office 21 November 2001 – 2 April 2003
- Premier: Bob Carr
- Preceded by: Paul Whelan
- Succeeded by: John Watkins

Member of Legislative Council of New South Wales
- In office 6 September 2001 – 23 September 2008
- Preceded by: Johno Johnson
- Succeeded by: John Robertson

Personal details
- Born: 15 July 1956 (age 70) Newcastle, New South Wales
- Party: Labor Party
- Spouse(s): Helen (div.); Deborah
- Children: 2 sons, 2 daughters
- Occupation: Union official

Michael Costa (born 15 July 1956) is an Australian former Labor politician. He was a member of the New South Wales Legislative Council from 2001 until 2008, and Treasurer of New South Wales from 2006 to 2008 and held other ministerial portfolios in the governments of premiers Bob Carr and Morris Iemma.

== Early life and career ==
Costa was born in Newcastle to Greek Cypriot migrants who came to Australia in the 1950s. In 1979, Costa began work as a rigger at the Garden Island naval dockyard. It was there where he was first involved with the Australian labour movement becoming a Delegate for the Federated Ironworkers' Association (now Australian Workers' Union).

In 1983, Costa joined the NSW Railways and started work as a trainee engineman, but never progressed to a driver, and became active in the Australian Federated Union of Locomotive Enginemen (AFULE). At the time the AFULE had a militant leadership who began a series of strikes over differences with the Australian Railways Union, whereby brake vans were removed from goods trains, and the guards were given locomotive jobs. In 1989, Costa was elected as an organiser with the Labor Council of New South Wales. In 1998, he was elected as Secretary of the Labor Council. He was the first Secretary to be of a non-English-speaking background.

== New South Wales Parliamentary career ==
Costa stood as the Labor Candidate for Strathfield at the 1991 election but was unsuccessful. Costa was appointed to the Legislative Council in 2001 following the resignation of Johno Johnson in the Carr Labor Government. Costa served as Police Minister from 21 November 2001 until 2 April 2003.

=== Transport Services and Roads portfolios ===
Costa served as Transport Services Minister from 2 April 2003 until 21 January 2005. He was also appointed as Minister for the Hunter, Minister Assisting the Minister for Natural Resources and Minister Assisting the Minister for State Development. The Transport portfolio was controversial during this time, mainly due to rail line closures and a train driver dispute. He is credited with the bus reform policies pursued by the Government. He also ordered the closure of the Murwillumbah line in April 2004 and the near-closure of part of the Newcastle line.

In 2004, train reliability was affected by a train driver dispute. This mainly stemmed from a "shortage of fit drivers and an unauthorised overtime ban" by drivers. Journalist Miranda Devine wrote that "health and psychometric checks of drivers, random drug and alcohol testing and "data loggers" on trains, which can be used to monitor a driver's speed, have caused disquiet among workers." NSW Unions said of Costa and the rail executive that "there has been a total breakdown in goodwill between RailCorp and its workforce."

When the Treasurer Michael Egan resigned unexpectedly in January 2005, the then Premier, Bob Carr, took the opportunity for a major reshuffle. Costa was subsequently shifted sideways to Roads and the minor portfolios of Ports and Economic Reform and replaced in Transport by John Watkins. Costa was Roads Minister between 21 January and 3 August 2005.

Following a cabinet reshuffle brought about by the resignation of Premier Carr in August 2005, Costa became the Minister for Finance and Infrastructure.

=== NSW Treasurer ===
Costa was appointed Treasurer on 17 February 2006. His time as Treasurer was marked by his relationship with his Federal counterpart, Peter Costello, at a time when the state's economy had begun to contract, raising the spectre of a recession.

Costa was the architect of his government's plans to privatise NSW's electricity sector and in the face of union opposition was arguing that the move would create jobs and secure a new power station to meet power demand. After the NSW ALP conference voted down the privatisation plans, Costa threatened to quit if the policy did not pass the NSW Parliament.

In September 2008, with Opposition from the Liberal and National Parties, as well as dissident Labor MPs, the privatisation bill was defeated. Soon afterwards, amid mounting leadership speculation, Morris Iemma dumped Costa as Treasurer, but then resigned as Premier after losing the support of the dominant right faction, and was replaced by Nathan Rees. Costa announced that he was quitting politics, and after resigning from his seat was replaced by John Robertson.

A week after his sacking, Costa said the Government was dominated by "spin merchants" and "machine politicians" who were unqualified to govern.

== Political views ==
Costa is seen as pro-economic development. The Sydney Morning Herald described him this way:

There's no holding back from Costa when he advocates coal mining, aluminium smelters and the privatisation of the electricity industry. This is an unabashed supporter of economic considerations above all else, for public service reform and for not believing climate-change doomsayers. As he puts it: "I want to see economic prosperity. I make no apology for that."

Costa has been described as the "State Government's leading climate change sceptic" mainly because of his views supporting increasing capacity of smelters and power stations. In June 2007, during question time in the New South Wales Legislative Council, Costa launched into a tirade against the theory of global warming and told caucus it should adopt a proposal that would allow big power users such as aluminium smelters to avoid the costs of meeting the Government's renewable energy targets to "save jobs in Newcastle and Wollongong". He also said he did not support Tim Flannery being made 2007 Australian of the Year. Part of Costa's statement is as follows:

But the Greens and idiots like Tim Flannery said it will never rain. Well it has started to rain and it seems as though it is going to rain forever. These people do not understand climate cycles. When it comes to the climate they are alarmists and cannot see beyond the end of their noses. They create division, panic and fear so that they can rustle up a few naive people to vote for them at election time. Climates change.

During the 2015 New South Wales state election, Costa whose own privatisation plan had been rejected by Labor's state conference, supported the privatisation stance of the Liberal government.

== Political commentator ==
After quitting politics, Costa became a regular columnist for The Australian newspaper. His columns were controversial for their attacks on environmentalists and the then-prime minister Kevin Rudd. For instance, in one column he attacked Rudd's essay The Global Financial Crisis, published in the left-leaning journal, The Monthly, arguing that "All the way through his essay Rudd tries to have it both ways, cherrypicking economic history to support his political prejudices". Another column claimed that "Rudd has a highly developed ability to ignore inconvenient views he has recently held when they conflict with his immediate political requirements". Costa was also critical of Rudd's plan to lift the age pension eligibility threshold to 67, arguing that "it will alone make very little real contribution to the important challenge of dealing with the costs of an ageing population".

Costa was also critical of Malcolm Turnbull, then leader of the Opposition, writing that "The Howard government lost many ministers but continued to have electoral success because, whether you liked it or not, you knew what the Howard government stood for. Does anybody know what the Turnbull opposition stands for?", a comment that earned the praise of conservative Daily Telegraph columnist Tim Blair.

In mid-2009, Costa stopped writing regular columns, but returned a year later, after the revelation in Betrayal, a book by Daily Telegraph journalist Simon Benson, that Rudd had reneged on a promise he made to Iemma to publicly support the electricity privatisation. Costa wrote that:

At a personal level these events are a kind of political morality tale. On one side is Iemma, an honourable man who was motivated by a misguided but strongly held belief in labour solidarity and doing the right thing by the ALP. On the other side is Rudd, a person who made a promise and consequently accrued benefits without reciprocating when he was required to do so. It is about the selflessness and selfishness. It is about character.

Costa also predicted that Rudd's character would be an issue at the 2010 Federal election stating that "(Rudd) chose to put his political popularity before the policy position. He chose to take the advice of machine men. These same machine men no doubt are closely watching the opinion polls and planning to politically execute him if his standing in the polls continues to decline". A few weeks later, Rudd resigned as prime minister shortly before a leadership ballot which he would have lost.

In December 2010, Costa had a piece titled Reform the cure for Labor's ills published in The Australian, contributing to the Labor Party's internal debate after the 2010 federal election which nearly saw Labor lose government after only one term in office. In that article, Costa argued that Labor's problems were due to the rise of individuals who valued winning elections at all costs, and had scant regard for sound policy. Costa also warned that Julia Gillard's embrace of the Greens was a tactical mistake as it had the effect of legitimising the Greens. Costa recommended that Labor reject the Greens by showing the negative economic and social consequences of their policies.

As of 2024, Costa has been appearing on The Bolt Report on a number of occasions to provide political commentary on controversial topics. Since October 2012, he has appeared on Channel 7 breakfast show Sunrise on Wednesdays as a Hot Topics regular, along with 2GB breakfast radio host Alan Jones.

== Personal life ==
Michael Costa currently resides in Wollombi in the Hunter Valley in rural New South Wales with his wife Deborah, a primary school teacher, with their two young children, Valentina and Mikos. He also has a son and daughter from a previous marriage. He has revealed that he struggled with bipolar disorder in 2001.

On 14 April 2011, an armed man broke into Costa's home, threatening his wife with a knife before tying her up and fleeing with their car.

Trade union offices
Preceded by Peter Sams	Secretary of the Labor Council of New South Wales; 1998–2001	Succeeded by John Robertson
