= Carr ministry =

Carr ministry may refer to the Government of New South Wales led by Bob Carr:

- Carr ministry (1995–1997)
- Carr ministry (1997–1999)
- Carr ministry (1999–2003)
- Carr ministry (2003–2005)
