= Minister for Multiculturalism =

Government minister in New South Wales, Australia

- Incumbent; Steve Kamper since 5 April 2023
- Department of Communities and Justice
- Style: The Honourable
- Nominator: Premier of New South Wales
- Appointer: Governor of New South Wales
- Inaugural holder: Clive Evatt (as Minister in Charge of Tourist Activities and Immigration)
- Formation: 9 May 1946

The Minister for Multiculturalism is a minister of the Government of New South Wales with responsibility for social policy and welfare, including multiculturalism in the state of New South Wales, Australia.

The Minister since 5 April 2023 is Steve Kamper, who also holds the Small Business, Lands and Property, and Sport portfolios.

The Minister assists the Minister for Families, Communities and Disability Services administer her portfolio through the Department of Communities and Justice.

== List of ministers ==
Ministerial title	Minister	Party	Ministry	Term start	Term end	Time in office	Notes
Minister in Charge of Tourist Activities and Immigration	Clive Evatt	Labor	McKell (2)	9 May 1946	6 February 1947	273 days	
Minister in Charge of Tourist Activities and Immigration	Frank Finnan	Labor	McGirr (1) (2)	6 February 1947	9 March 1948	1 year, 32 days	
Minister in Charge of Tourist Activities and Immigration	Claude Matthews	Labor	McGirr (2)	9 March 1948	21 September 1949	1 year, 196 days	
Minister in Charge of Tourist Activities and Immigration	Joshua Arthur	Labor	McGirr (2)	21 September 1949	30 June 1950	3 years, 155 days	
Minister for Immigration	Joshua Arthur	Labor	McGirr (3); Cahill (1)	30 June 1950	23 February 1953	3 years, 155 days	
Minister for Immigration	Gus Kelly	Labor	Cahill (2)	23 February 1953	15 March 1956	3 years, 21 days	
Minister for Youth, Ethnic and Community Affairs	Steve Mauger	Liberal	Lewis (1) (2)	3 January 1975	23 January 1976	1 year, 20 days	
Minister for Youth, Ethnic and Community Affairs	Jim Clough	Liberal	Willis	23 January 1976	14 May 1976	112 days	
Minister for Ethnic Affairs	Neville Wran	Labor	Wran (7) (8)	6 February 1985	4 July 1986	1 year, 148 days	
Minister for Ethnic Affairs	Barrie Unsworth	Labor	Unsworth	4 July 1986	21 March 1988	1 year, 261 days	
Minister for Ethnic Affairs	Nick Greiner	Liberal	Greiner (1) (2)	25 March 1988	24 June 1992	4 years, 95 days	
Minister for Ethnic Affairs	John Fahey	Liberal	Fahey (1)	24 June 1992	3 July 1992	9 days	
Minister for Ethnic Affairs	George Souris	National	Fahey (2)	3 July 1992	26 May 1993	327 days	
Minister for Multicultural and Ethnic Affairs	Michael Photios	Liberal	Fahey (3)	26 May 1993	4 April 1995	1 year, 313 days	
Minister for Ethnic Affairs	Bob Carr	Labor	Carr (1) (2)	4 April 1995	8 April 1999	10 years, 121 days	
Minister for Citizenship	Bob Carr	Labor	Carr (3) (4)	8 April 1999	3 August 2005	10 years, 121 days	
Minister for Citizenship	Morris Iemma	Labor	Iemma (1) (2)	3 August 2005	5 September 2008	3 years, 33 days	
Minister for Citizenship	Virginia Judge	Labor	Rees	8 September 2008	4 December 2009	1 year, 90 days	
Minister for Citizenship	John Hatzistergos	Labor	Keneally	8 December 2009	28 March 2011	1 year, 114 days	
Minister for Citizenship and Communities	Victor Dominello	Liberal	O'Farrell; Baird (1)	3 April 2011	2 April 2015	4 years, 5 days	
Minister for Multiculturalism	John Ajaka	Liberal	Baird (2)	2 April 2015	30 January 2017	1 year, 303 days	
Minister for Multiculturalism	Ray Williams	Liberal	Berejiklian (1)	30 January 2017	23 March 2019	2 years, 52 days	
Minister for Sport, Multiculturalism, Seniors and Veterans	John Sidoti	Liberal	Berejiklian (2)	2 April 2019	17 September 2019	168 days	
Minister for Sport, Multiculturalism, Seniors and Veterans	Geoff Lee (acting)	Liberal	Berejiklian (2)	17 September 2019	27 May 2021	1 year, 252 days	
Minister for Sport, Multiculturalism, Seniors and Veterans	Natalie Ward	Liberal	Berejiklian (2); Perrottet (1)	27 May 2021	21 December 2021	208 days	
Minister for Multiculturalism	Mark Coure	Liberal	Perrottet (2)	21 December 2021	28 March 2023	1 year, 97 days	
Minister for Multiculturalism	Steve Kamper	Labor	Minns	5 April 2023	incumbent	3 years, 227 days	

== Former ministerial titles ==
=== Assisting ministers ===
Ministerial title	Minister	Party	Ministry	Term start	Term end	Time in office	Notes
Minister Assisting the Premier on Citizenship	Morris Iemma	Labor	Carr (1) (2) (3)	8 April 1999	2 April 2003	3 years, 359 days	
Minister Assisting the Premier on Citizenship	John Hatzistergos	Labor	Carr (4)	2 April 2003	3 August 2005	2 years, 123 days	
Minister Assisting the Premier on Citizenship	Milton Orkopoulos	Labor	Iemma (1)	3 August 2005	8 November 2006	1 year, 97 days	
Minister Assisting the Premier on Citizenship	Reba Meagher	Labor	Iemma (1)	8 November 2006	2 April 2007	145 days	
Minister Assisting the Premier on Citizenship	Graham West	Labor	Iemma (2)	2 April 2007	11 April 2007	9 days	
Minister Assisting the Premier on Citizenship	Barbara Perry	Labor	Iemma (2)	11 April 2007	5 September 2008	1 year, 147 days	

== See also ==
- List of New South Wales government agencies
