= Minister for Regional New South Wales =

Cabinet position in New South Wales Government

- Incumbent; Tara Moriarty since 5 April 2023
- Department of Regional NSW
- Style: The Honourable
- Nominator: Premier of New South Wales
- Appointer: Governor of New South Wales
- Inaugural holder: Ray Chappell (as Minister for Regional Development)
- Formation: 26 May 1993

The Minister for Regional New South Wales is a minister in the Government of New South Wales who has responsibilities for regional areas. The minister is responsible for administering the Regional NSW cluster.

In the Minns ministry there are two other ministers with specific regional responsibility:

- Minister for Regional Health, Ryan Park
- Minister for Regional Transport and Roads, Jenny Aitchison.

Ultimately the minister is responsible to the Parliament of New South Wales.

== List of ministers ==
=== Regional New South Wales ===
The following individuals have served as Minister for Regional New South Wales or any precedent titles:

Title	Minister	Party	Ministry	Term start	Term end	Time in office	Notes
Minister for Regional Development	Ray Chappell	National	Fahey (3)	26 May 1993	4 April 1995	1 year, 313 days	
Minister for Small Business and Regional Development	Carl Scully	Labor	Carr (1)	4 April 1995	15 December 1995	255 days	
Minister for State and Regional Development	Michael Egan	Labor	Carr (1)	15 December 1995	1 December 1997	1 year, 351 days	
Minister for Regional Development	Harry Woods	Labor	Carr (2) (3)	1 December 1997	2 April 2003	5 years, 122 days	
Minister for Regional Development	David Campbell	Labor	Carr (4); Iemma (1)	2 April 2003	2 April 2007	4 years, 0 days	
Minister for Regional Development	Tony Kelly	Labor	Iemma (2)	2 April 2007	5 September 2008	1 year, 156 days	
Minister for Regional Development	Phil Costa	Labor	Rees	8 September 2008	4 December 2009	1 year, 87 days	
Minister for State and Regional Development	Ian Macdonald	Labor	Keneally	8 December 2009	5 June 2010	179 days	
Minister for State and Regional Development	Eric Roozendaal	Labor	Keneally	5 June 2010	28 March 2011	296 days	
Minister for Regional Infrastructure and Services	Andrew Stoner	National	O'Farrell; Baird (1)	28 March 2011	17 October 2014	3 years, 203 days	
Minister for Regional Infrastructure and Services	Troy Grant	National	Baird (1)	17 October 2014	2 April 2015	167 days	
Minister for Regional Development	John Barilaro	National	Baird (2)	2 April 2015	30 January 2017	6 years, 187 days	
Minister for Regional New South Wales	John Barilaro	National	Berejiklian (1)	30 January 2017	2 April 2019	6 years, 187 days	
Minister for Regional New South Wales, Industry and Trade	John Barilaro	National	Berejiklian (2)	2 April 2019	6 October 2021	6 years, 187 days	
Minister for Regional New South Wales	Paul Toole	National	Perrottet (1) (2)	6 October 2021	28 March 2023	1 year, 173 days	
Minister for Regional New South Wales	Tara Moriarty	Labor	Minns	5 April 2023	incumbent	3 years, 224 days	

== Assistant ministerial titles ==
=== Regional tourism ===
Title	Minister	Party	Ministry	Term start	Term end	Time in office	Notes
Assistant Minister for Tourism and Major Events	Katrina Hodgkinson	National	O'Farrell	23 April 2014	17 October 2014	177 days	
Minister for Regional Tourism	John Barilaro	National	Baird (1)	17 October 2014	2 April 2015	167 days	

== See also ==
- List of New South Wales government agencies
