= Minister for Seniors (New South Wales) =

Government minister in New South Wales, Australia

- Incumbent; Jodie Harrison since 5 April 2023
- Department of Communities and Justice
- Style: The Honourable
- Nominator: Premier of New South Wales
- Appointer: Governor of New South Wales
- Inaugural holder: Jim Longley (as Minister for the Ageing)
- Formation: 6 October 1993

The Minister for Seniors is a minister of the Government of New South Wales with responsibility for social policy and welfare concerning seniors or the aged in the state of New South Wales, Australia.

The Minister since 5 April 2023 is Jodie Harrison, who also holds the Women and Prevention of Domestic Violence and Sexual Assault portfolios.

The Minister assists the Minister for Families and Communities administer her portfolio through the Stronger Communities cluster, in particular through the Department of Communities and Justice and a range of other government agencies.

== List of ministers ==
Ministerial title	Minister	Party	Ministry	Term start	Term end	Time in office	Notes
Minister for the Ageing	Jim Longley	Liberal	Fahey (3)	6 October 1993	4 April 1995	1 year, 180 days	
Minister for Aged Services	Ron Dyer	Labor	Carr (1)	4 April 1995	1 December 1997	2 years, 241 days	
Minister for Ageing	Faye Lo Po'	Labor	Carr (2)	1 December 1997	8 April 1999	4 years, 222 days	
Minister for Ageing	Faye Lo Po'	Labor	Carr (3)	8 April 1999	11 July 2002	4 years, 222 days	
Minister for Ageing	Carmel Tebbutt	Labor	Carr (3)	11 July 2002	3 April 2003	2 years, 266 days	
Minister for Ageing	Carmel Tebbutt	Labor	Carr (4)	3 April 2003	21 January 2005	2 years, 266 days	
Minister for Ageing	John Della Bosca	Labor	Iemma (1)	21 January 2005	2 April 2007	2 years, 71 days	
Minister for Ageing	Kristina Keneally	Labor	Iemma (2)	2 April 2007	5 September 2008	1 year, 156 days	
Minister for Ageing	Paul Lynch	Labor	Rees	8 September 2008	4 December 2009	1 year, 255 days	
Minister for Ageing	Paul Lynch	Labor	Keneally	4 December 2009	21 May 2010	1 year, 255 days	
Minister for Ageing	Peter Primrose	Labor	Keneally	21 May 2010	28 March 2011	311 days	
Minister for Ageing	Andrew Constance	Liberal	O'Farrell	3 April 2011	23 April 2014	3 years, 20 days	
Minister for Ageing	John Ajaka	Liberal	Baird (1) (2)	23 April 2014	30 January 2017	2 years, 282 days	
Minister for Ageing	Tanya Davies	Liberal	Berejiklian (1)	30 January 2017	23 March 2019	2 years, 52 days	
Minister for Sport, Multiculturalism, Seniors and Veterans	John Sidoti	Liberal	Berejiklian (2)	2 April 2019	17 September 2019	168 days	
Minister for Sport, Multiculturalism, Seniors and Veterans	Geoff Lee (acting)	Liberal	Berejiklian (2)	17 September 2019	27 May 2021	1 year, 252 days	
Minister for Sport, Multiculturalism, Seniors and Veterans	Natalie Ward	Liberal	Berejiklian (2); Perrottet (1)	27 May 2021	21 December 2021	208 days	
Minister for Seniors	Mark Coure	Liberal	Perrottet (2)	21 December 2021	28 March 2023	1 year, 97 days	
Minister for Seniors	Jodie Harrison	Labor	Minns	5 April 2023	incumbent	3 years, 227 days	

== See also ==
- Minister for Aged Care
- List of New South Wales government agencies
