= Baird ministry (2014–2015) =

94th New South Wales government ministry, led by Mike Baird

First Baird ministry
- 94th Cabinet of New South Wales

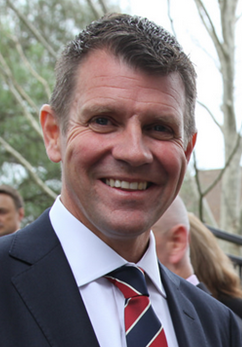
- Premier Mike Baird, pictured in 2014
- Date formed: 17 April 2014
- Date dissolved: 2 April 2015

People and organisations
- Monarch: Queen Elizabeth II
- Governor: Marie Bashir (until October 2014); David Hurley (from October 2014)
- Premier: Mike Baird
- Deputy Premier: Andrew Stoner; Troy Grant
- No. of ministers: 22
- Member party: Liberal–National Coalition
- Status in legislature: Majority Coalition Government
- Opposition party: Labor
- Opposition leader: John Robertson (2011-2014); Linda Burney (2014-2015 interim); Luke Foley (2015)

History
- Outgoing election: 2015 state election
- Predecessor: O'Farrell ministry
- Successor: Second Baird ministry

The Baird ministry (2014–2015) or First Baird ministry was the 94th ministry of the Government of New South Wales, and was led by Mike Baird, the state's 44th Premier.

The Liberal–National coalition ministry was formed following the announcement by Barry O'Farrell on 16 April 2014 that he would resign as Premier. Baird was elected as leader of the Liberal Party on 17 April 2014 and was sworn in as Premier together with his ministry on 23 April 2014 at Government House by the Governor of New South Wales Marie Bashir.

The ministry covered the period from 17 April 2014 until 2 April 2015 when the Second Baird ministry was formed, following the re-election of the Coalition at the 2015 state election.

== Composition of ministry ==
The first rearrangement occurred in May 2014 when Mike Gallacher resigned from the ministry after he was named at the Independent Commission Against Corruption for alleged involvement in a corrupt scheme to receive illegal political donations. (Note: Gallacher resigned from the ministry on 2 May 2014. He was replaced by Stuart Ayres (Police and Emergency Services), Andrew Constance (Industrial Relations), Duncan Gay (Vice-President of the Executive Council and Leader of the Government in Legislative Council) and Rob Stokes (Central Coast).) (Note: Matthew Mason-Cox was promoted to the ministry in the portfolio of Fair Trading replacing Stuart Ayres.) The second rearrangement occurred in October 2014 following the resignation of Andrew Stoner as Deputy Premier and Leader of the National Party citing family reasons. Troy Grant was elected unopposed to succeed him as leader of the Nationals. (Note: Andrew Stoner resigned from the ministry on 15 October 2014 and was replaced by Troy Grant (Deputy Premier, Trade and Investment, Regional Infrastructure and Services, Tourism and Major Events), Duncan Gay (North Coast) and promoted to the ministry was John Barilaro (Small Business).) (Note: Katrina Hodgkinson relinquished the portfolio of Assistant Minister for Tourism and Major Events and was replaced by John Barilaro in the portfolio of Regional Tourism.)

Portfolio	Minister	Party	Term commence	Term end	Term of office
Premier	Mike Baird	Liberal	17 April 2014	2 April 2015	350 days
Minister for Infrastructure	Mike Baird	Liberal	23 April 2014	2 April 2015	344 days
Minister for Western Sydney	Mike Baird	Liberal	23 April 2014	2 April 2015	344 days
Deputy Premier (Note: Retained portfolio from the O'Farrell ministry.)	Andrew Stoner	National	17 April 2014	17 October 2014	183 days
Minister for Trade and Investment	Andrew Stoner	National	23 April 2014	17 October 2014	177 days
Minister for Regional Infrastructure and Services	Andrew Stoner	National	23 April 2014	17 October 2014	177 days
Minister for Tourism and Major Events	Andrew Stoner	National	23 April 2014	17 October 2014	177 days
Deputy Premier	Troy Grant	National	17 October 2014	2 April 2015	167 days
Minister for Trade and Investment	Troy Grant	National	17 October 2014	2 April 2015	167 days
Minister for Regional Infrastructure and Services	Troy Grant	National	17 October 2014	2 April 2015	167 days
Minister for Tourism and Major Events	Troy Grant	National	17 October 2014	2 April 2015	167 days
Minister for Small Business	Andrew Stoner	National	23 April 2014	17 October 2014	177 days
Minister for Small Business	John Barilaro	National	17 October 2014	2 April 2015	167 days
Minister for the North Coast	Andrew Stoner	National	23 April 2014	17 October 2014	177 days
Minister for the North Coast	Duncan Gay MLC	National	17 October 2014	2 April 2015	167 days
Minister for Transport	Gladys Berejiklian	Liberal	23 April 2014	2 April 2015	344 days
Minister for the Hunter.	Gladys Berejiklian	Liberal	23 April 2014	2 April 2015	344 days
Minister for Education	Adrian Piccoli	National	23 April 2014	2 April 2015	344 days
Minister for Police and Emergency Services	Mike Gallacher MLC	Liberal	23 April 2014	2 May 2014	9 days
Minister for Police and Emergency Services	Stuart Ayres	Liberal	7 May 2014	2 April 2015	330 days
Minister for Industrial Relations	Mike Gallacher MLC	Liberal	23 April 2014	2 May 2014	9 days
Minister for Industrial Relations	Andrew Constance	Liberal	7 May 2014	2 April 2015	330 days
Minister for the Central Coast	Mike Gallacher MLC	Liberal	23 April 2014	2 May 2014	9 days
Minister for the Central Coast	Rob Stokes	Liberal	7 May 2014	2 April 2015	330 days
Vice-President of the Executive Council; Leader of the Government in Legislative Council	Mike Gallacher MLC	Liberal	23 April 2014	2 May 2014	9 days
Vice-President of the Executive Council; Leader of the Government in Legislative Council	Duncan Gay MLC	National	7 May 2014	2 April 2015	330 days
Minister for Roads and Freight	Duncan Gay MLC	National	23 April 2014	2 April 2015	344 days
Minister for Resources and Energy	Anthony Roberts	Liberal	23 April 2014	2 April 2015	344 days
Special Minister of State	Anthony Roberts	Liberal	23 April 2014	2 April 2015	344 days
Minister for Health	Jillian Skinner	Liberal	23 April 2014	2 April 2015	344 days
Minister for Medical Research	Jillian Skinner	Liberal	23 April 2014	2 April 2015	344 days
Treasurer	Andrew Constance	Liberal	23 April 2014	2 April 2015	344 days
Minister for Planning	Pru Goward	Liberal	23 April 2014	2 April 2015	344 days
Minister for Women	Pru Goward	Liberal	23 April 2014	2 April 2015	344 days
Attorney General	Brad Hazzard	Liberal	23 April 2014	2 April 2015	344 days
Minister for Justice	Brad Hazzard	Liberal	23 April 2014	2 April 2015	344 days
Minister for Family and Community Services	Gabrielle Upton	Liberal	23 April 2014	2 April 2015	344 days
Minister for Primary Industries	Katrina Hodgkinson	National	23 April 2014	2 April 2015	344 days
Assistant Minister for Tourism and Major Events	Katrina Hodgkinson	National	23 April 2014	17 October 2014	177 days
Minister for Regional Tourism	John Barilaro	National	17 October 2014	2 April 2015	167 days
Minister for Natural Resources, Lands and Water	Kevin Humphries	National	23 April 2014	2 April 2015	344 days
Minister for Western New South Wales	Kevin Humphries	National	23 April 2014	2 April 2015	344 days
Minister for Ageing	John Ajaka MLC	Liberal	23 April 2014	2 April 2015	344 days
Minister for Disability Services	John Ajaka MLC	Liberal	23 April 2014	2 April 2015	344 days
Minister for the Illawarra	John Ajaka MLC	Liberal	23 April 2014	2 April 2015	344 days
Minister for Fair Trading	Stuart Ayres	Liberal	23 April 2014	7 May 2014	14 days
Minister for Fair Trading	Matthew Mason-Cox, MLC	Liberal	7 May 2014	2 April 2015	330 days
Minister for Sport and Recreation	Stuart Ayres	Liberal	23 April 2014	2 April 2015	344 days
Minister Assisting the Premier on Western Sydney	Stuart Ayres	Liberal	23 April 2014	2 April 2015	344 days
Minister for Citizenship and Communities	Victor Dominello	Liberal	23 April 2014	2 April 2015	344 days
Minister for Aboriginal Affairs	Victor Dominello	Liberal	23 April 2014	2 April 2015	344 days
Minister for Veterans Affairs	Victor Dominello	Liberal	23 April 2014	2 April 2015	344 days
Assistant Minister for Education	Victor Dominello	Liberal	23 April 2014	2 April 2015	344 days
Minister for the Environment	Rob Stokes	Liberal	23 April 2014	2 April 2015	344 days
Minister for Heritage	Rob Stokes	Liberal	23 April 2014	2 April 2015	344 days
Assistant Minister for Planning	Rob Stokes	Liberal	23 April 2014	2 April 2015	344 days
Minister for Hospitality, Gaming and Racing	Troy Grant	National	23 April 2014	2 April 2015	344 days
Minister for the Arts	Troy Grant	National	23 April 2014	2 April 2015	344 days
Minister for Finance and Services	Dominic Perrottet	Liberal	23 April 2014	2 April 2015	344 days
Minister for Local Government	Paul Toole	National	23 April 2014	2 April 2015	344 days
Minister for Mental Health	Jai Rowell	Liberal	23 April 2014	2 April 2015	344 days
Assistant Minister for Health	Jai Rowell	Liberal	23 April 2014	2 April 2015	344 days

Ministers are members of the Legislative Assembly unless otherwise noted.

== See also ==
- Members of the New South Wales Legislative Assembly, 2011–2015
- Members of the New South Wales Legislative Council, 2011–2015

== Notes ==
New South Wales government ministries
Preceded by O'Farrell ministry	Baird ministry 2014–2015	Succeeded by Second Baird ministry
