= Iemma ministry (2007–08) =

90th ministry of the New South Wales government

Second Iemma ministry
- 90th Cabinet of New South Wales

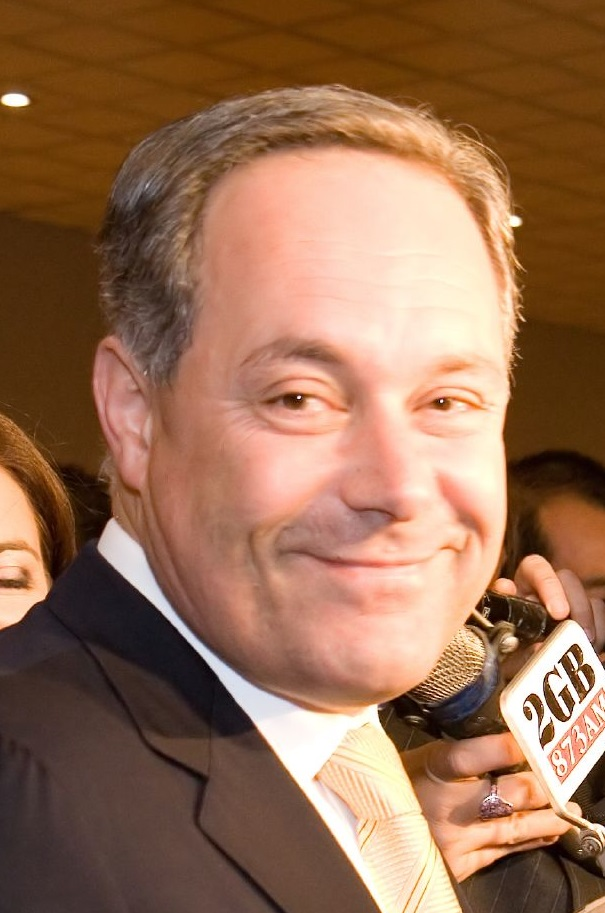
- Premier Morris Iemma
- Date formed: 2 April 2007
- Date dissolved: 5 September 2008

People and organisations
- Monarch: Queen Elizabeth II
- Governor: Marie Bashir
- Deputy Premier: John Watkins
- No. of ministers: 20
- Member party: Labor
- Status in legislature: Labor Majority Government
- Opposition party: Liberal–National Coalition
- Opposition leader: Barry O'Farrell

History
- Election: 2007 New South Wales state election
- Predecessor: First Iemma ministry
- Successor: Rees ministry

The Iemma ministry (2007–08) or Second Iemma ministry is the 90th ministry of the Government of New South Wales, and was led by the 40th Premier Morris Iemma. It was the second and subsequent of two occasions when Iemma was Premier.

The Second Iemma Labor ministry was formed following the 2007 state election where the Iemma government was re-elected.

This ministry covers the period from 2 April 2007 until 5 September 2008, when the Rees ministry was sworn in after Nathan Rees succeeded Iemma as Premier in a Labor caucus revolt on 5 September 2008.

== Composition of ministry ==
The ministry was announced on 2 April 2007. Paul Gibson was set to be appointed to the portfolios of Sport, Western Sydney and assistant minister for road safety however he was dumped amid allegations of domestic violence. The Labor caucus elected Barbara Perry unopposed for promotion to the ministry. (Note: Barbara Perry was promoted to the ministry on 11 April and was allocated the portfolio of Juvenile Justice from John Hatzistergos and Western Sydney and Minister Assisting the Premier on Citizenship from Graham West.) Phil Koperberg resigned from the ministry in February 2008 prompting a second minor rearrangement. (Note: Phil Koperberg resigned from the ministry on 27 February 2008. His portfolio of Climate Change, Environment and Water was split with Verity Firth appointed to the portfolio of Climate Change and Environment, while Nathan Rees was appointed to the new portfolio of Water, expanded from his previous portfolio of Water Utilities.)

Portfolio	Minister	Party	Term commence	Term end	Term of office
Premier	Morris Iemma (Note: Retained portfolio from the first Iemma ministry.)	Labor	2 April 2007	5 September 2008	1 year, 156 days
Minister for Citizenship	Morris Iemma	Labor	2 April 2007	5 September 2008	1 year, 156 days
Deputy Premier	John Watkins	Labor	2 April 2007	5 September 2008	1 year, 156 days
Minister for Transport	John Watkins	Labor	2 April 2007	5 September 2008	1 year, 156 days
Minister for Finance	John Watkins	Labor	2 April 2007	5 September 2008	1 year, 156 days
Minister Assisting the Minister for Finance	John Della Bosca, MLC	Labor	2 April 2007	5 September 2008	1 year, 156 days
Minister for Education and Training	John Della Bosca, MLC	Labor	2 April 2007	5 September 2008	1 year, 156 days
Minister for Industrial Relations	John Della Bosca, MLC	Labor	2 April 2007	5 September 2008	1 year, 156 days
Minister for the Central Coast	John Della Bosca, MLC	Labor	2 April 2007	5 September 2008	1 year, 156 days
Treasurer	Michael Costa, MLC	Labor	2 April 2007	5 September 2008	1 year, 156 days
Minister for Infrastructure	Michael Costa, MLC	Labor	2 April 2007	5 September 2008	1 year, 156 days
Minister for the Hunter	Michael Costa, MLC	Labor	2 April 2007	5 September 2008	1 year, 156 days
Attorney-General	John Hatzistergos, MLC	Labor	2 April 2007	5 September 2008	1 year, 156 days
Minister for Justice	John Hatzistergos, MLC	Labor	2 April 2007	5 September 2008	1 year, 156 days
Minister for Juvenile Justice	John Hatzistergos, MLC	Labor	2 April 2007	11 April 2007	9 days
Minister for Juvenile Justice	Barbara Perry	Labor	11 April 2007	5 September 2008	1 year, 147 days
Minister for Planning	Frank Sartor	Labor	2 April 2007	5 September 2008	1 year, 156 days
Minister for Redfern Waterloo	Frank Sartor	Labor	2 April 2007	5 September 2008	1 year, 156 days
Minister for the Arts	Frank Sartor	Labor	2 April 2007	5 September 2008	1 year, 156 days
Minister for Health	Reba Meagher	Labor	2 April 2007	5 September 2008	1 year, 156 days
Minister for Police	David Campbell	Labor	2 April 2007	5 September 2008	1 year, 156 days
Minister for the Illawarra	David Campbell	Labor	2 April 2007	5 September 2008	1 year, 156 days
Minister for Roads	Eric Roozendaal, MLC	Labor	2 April 2007	5 September 2008	1 year, 156 days
Minister for Commerce	Eric Roozendaal, MLC	Labor	2 April 2007	5 September 2008	1 year, 156 days
Minister for Primary Industries	Ian Macdonald, MLC	Labor	2 April 2007	5 September 2008	1 year, 156 days
Minister for Energy	Ian Macdonald, MLC	Labor	2 April 2007	5 September 2008	1 year, 156 days
Minister for Mineral Resources	Ian Macdonald, MLC	Labor	2 April 2007	5 September 2008	1 year, 156 days
Minister for State Development	Ian Macdonald, MLC	Labor	2 April 2007	5 September 2008	1 year, 156 days
Minister for Lands	Tony Kelly, MLC	Labor	2 April 2007	5 September 2008	1 year, 156 days
Minister for Rural Affairs	Tony Kelly, MLC	Labor	2 April 2007	5 September 2008	1 year, 156 days
Minister for Regional Development	Tony Kelly, MLC	Labor	2 April 2007	5 September 2008	1 year, 156 days
Vice-President of the Executive Council; Leader of the Government in Legislative Council	Tony Kelly, MLC	Labor	2 April 2007	5 September 2008	1 year, 156 days
Minister for Climate Change, Environment and Water	Phil Koperberg	Labor	2 April 2007	27 February 2008	331 days
Minister for Climate Change and Environment	Verity Firth	Labor	27 February 2008	5 September 2008	191 days
Minister for Community Services	Kevin Greene	Labor	2 April 2007	5 September 2008	1 year, 156 days
Minister for Ageing	Kristina Keneally	Labor	2 April 2007	5 September 2008	1 year, 156 days
Minister for Disability Services	Kristina Keneally	Labor	2 April 2007	5 September 2008	1 year, 156 days
Minister for Small Business	Joe Tripodi	Labor	2 April 2007	5 September 2008	1 year, 156 days
Minister for Regulatory Reform	Joe Tripodi	Labor	2 April 2007	5 September 2008	1 year, 156 days
Minister for Ports and Waterways	Joe Tripodi	Labor	2 April 2007	5 September 2008	1 year, 156 days
Minister for Emergency Services	Nathan Rees	Labor	2 April 2007	5 September 2008	1 year, 156 days
Minister for Water Utilities	Nathan Rees	Labor	2 April 2007	27 February 2008	331 days
Minister for Water	Nathan Rees	Labor	27 February 2008	5 September 2008	191 days
Minister for Housing	Matt Brown	Labor	2 April 2007	5 September 2008	1 year, 156 days
Minister for Tourism	Matt Brown	Labor	2 April 2007	5 September 2008	1 year, 156 days
Minister for Fair Trading	Linda Burney	Labor	2 April 2007	5 September 2008	1 year, 156 days
Minister for Youth	Linda Burney	Labor	2 April 2007	5 September 2008	1 year, 156 days
Minister for Volunteering	Linda Burney	Labor	2 April 2007	5 September 2008	1 year, 156 days
Minister for Local Government	Paul Lynch	Labor	2 April 2007	5 September 2008	1 year, 156 days
Minister for Aboriginal Affairs	Paul Lynch	Labor	2 April 2007	5 September 2008	1 year, 156 days
Minister Assisting the Minister for Health (Mental Health)	Paul Lynch	Labor	2 April 2007	5 September 2008	1 year, 156 days
Minister for Women	Verity Firth	Labor	2 April 2007	5 September 2008	1 year, 156 days
Minister for Science and Medical Research	Verity Firth	Labor	2 April 2007	5 September 2008	1 year, 156 days
Minister Assisting the Minister for Health (Cancer)	Verity Firth	Labor	2 April 2007	5 September 2008	1 year, 156 days
Minister for Gaming and Racing	Graham West	Labor	2 April 2007	5 September 2008	1 year, 156 days
Minister for Sport and Recreation	Graham West	Labor	2 April 2007	5 September 2008	1 year, 156 days
Minister for Western Sydney	Graham West	Labor	2 April 2007	11 April 2007	9 days
Minister for Western Sydney	Barbara Perry	Labor	11 April 2007	5 September 2008	1 year, 156 days
Minister Assisting the Premier on Citizenship	Graham West	Labor	2 April 2007	11 April 2007	9 days
Minister Assisting the Premier on Citizenship	Barbara Perry	Labor	11 April 2007	5 September 2008	1 year, 156 days

Ministers are members of the Legislative Assembly unless otherwise noted.

== See also ==
- Members of the New South Wales Legislative Assembly, 2007-2011
- Members of the New South Wales Legislative Council, 2007-2011

== Notes ==
New South Wales government ministries
Preceded by First Iemma ministry 2005–2007	Second Iemma ministry 2007–2008	Succeeded by Rees ministry 2008–2009
