= Minister for Western Sydney =

Government minister in New South Wales, Australia

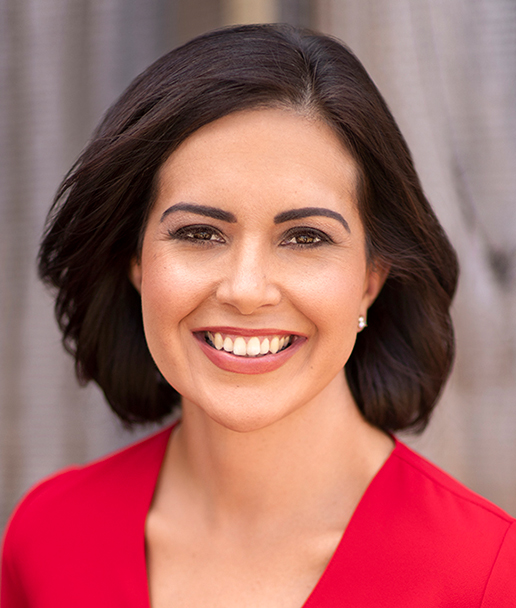
- Incumbent; Prue Car since 5 April 2023
- Department of Planning, Housing and Infrastructure
- Style: The Honourable
- Nominator: Premier of New South Wales
- Appointer: Governor of New South Wales
- Inaugural holder: Kim Yeadon
- Formation: 1 December 1997

The Minister for Western Sydney is a minister in the New South Wales Government with responsibility for the Greater Western Sydney, Australia.

It was first established in 1997 in the second Carr ministry as an assistant minister, before becoming a separate portfolio in the third Carr ministry. The portfolio was only intermittently responsible for any legislation, nor tasked with the management of a department. The region is not defined, although generally consistent with Greater Western Sydney the portfolio has on occasion been responsible for areas outside that region, such as the Sydney Olympic Park.

In the second Perrottet ministry the portfolio is responsible for the Western Parkland City Authority, which includes the region around the Western Sydney Airport.

== List of ministers ==
The following individuals have served as Minister for Western Sydney, or any precedent titles:

Title	Minister	Party	Ministry	Term start	Term end	Time in office	Notes
Minister for Western Sydney	Kim Yeadon	Labor	Carr (3)	8 April 1999	2 April 2003	3 years, 359 days	
Minister for Western Sydney	Diane Beamer	Labor	Carr (4); Iemma (1)	2 April 2003	2 April 2007	4 years, 0 days	
Minister for Western Sydney	Graham West	Labor	Iemma (2)	2 April 2007	11 April 2007	9 days	
Minister for Western Sydney	Barbara Perry	Labor	Iemma (2)	11 April 2007	8 September 2008	1 year, 150 days	
Minister for Western Sydney	David Borger	Labor	Rees; Keneally	8 September 2008	28 March 2011	2 years, 201 days	
Minister for Western Sydney	Barry O'Farrell	Liberal	O'Farrell	3 April 2011	23 April 2014	3 years, 364 days	
Minister for Western Sydney	Mike Baird	Liberal	Baird (1) (2)	23 April 2014	23 January 2017	1 year, 296 days	
Minister for Western Sydney	Stuart Ayres	Liberal	Berejiklian (1)	30 January 2017	23 March 2019	5 years, 185 days	
Minister for Jobs, Investment, Tourism and Western Sydney	Stuart Ayres	Liberal	Berejiklian (2); Perrottet (1)	2 April 2019	21 December 2021	5 years, 185 days	
Minister for Western Sydney	Stuart Ayres	Liberal	Perrottet (2)	21 December 2021	3 August 2022	5 years, 185 days	
Minister for Western Sydney	David Elliott	Liberal	Perrottet (2)	5 August 2022	28 March 2023	235 days	
Minister for Western Sydney	Prue Car	Labor	Minns	5 April 2023	incumbent	3 years, 155 days	

=== Assistant ministers ===
Title	Minister	Party	Ministry	Term start	Term end	Time in office	Notes
Minister Assisting the Premier on Western Sydney	Kim Yeadon	Labor	Carr (1) (2)	1 December 1997	8 April 1999	1 year, 128 days	
Minister Assisting the Premier on Western Sydney	Stuart Ayres	Liberal	O'Farrell; Baird (1)	9 December 2013	2 April 2015	1 year, 114 days	
