= Centre for Policing, Intelligence & Counter Terrorism =

Australian organisation

The Centre for Policing, Intelligence and Counter Terrorism is an Australian organisation at Macquarie University formed in response to the threat of terrorism. The centre, founded in 2005, seeks to promote research, deliver postgraduate programs, and provide professional education and consultancy services.

The main focuses of the centre are:

- Policing (Operational Response and Public Disorder)
- South-East Asia Geo-Political Trends
- Cybercrime and Cyberterrorism
- Organised Crime
- Terrorism and Insurgency
- Counter-terrorism
- Intelligence Analysis
- Transport Security
- Computer Forensics

The current director is Peter Anderson, who was the New South Wales (NSW) Labor Minister for Police and Emergency Services from 1981 to 1986. He has been serving in this capacity since 2007. In late 2013, Peter Anderson's position was advertised as vacant pending his retirement in December 2013.

In October 2010, the NSW Independent Commission Against Corruption (New South Wales) (ICAC) completed an investigation into multiple allegations from a number of former PICT staff about bullying and victimisation. The ICAC-appointed investigator found substance in the allegations of bullying and victimisation against former staff. The ICAC appointed investigator also found evidence supporting the allegation that the university failed to take adequate action in response to complaints raised by a number of staff. The ICAC sent a copy of the report to the University and the NSW Ombudsman.
