= Baird ministry (2015–2017) =

Cabinet of New South Wales

Second Baird ministry
- 95th Cabinet of New South Wales

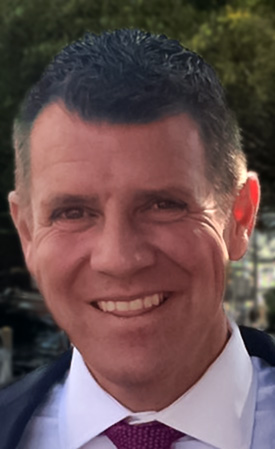
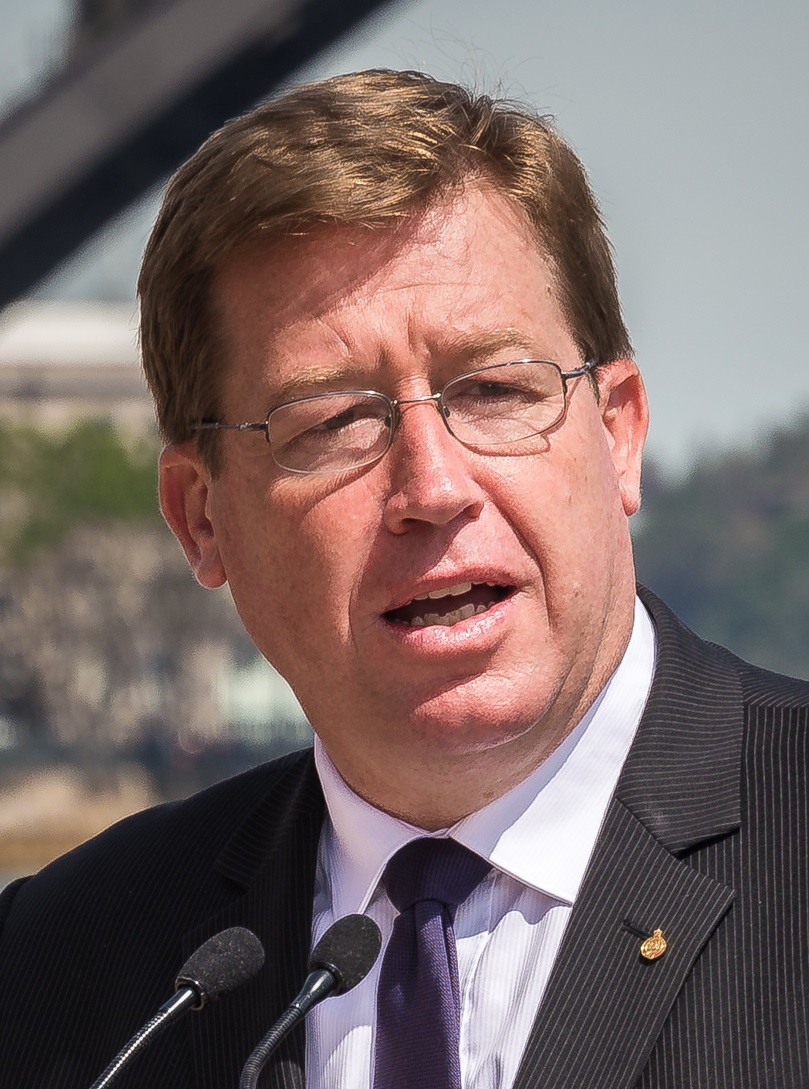
- Mike Baird Troy Grant
- Date formed: 2 April 2015
- Date dissolved: 23 January 2017

People and organisations
- Monarch: Queen Elizabeth II
- Governor: David Hurley
- Premier: Mike Baird
- Deputy Premier: Troy Grant / John Barilaro
- No. of ministers: 22
- Total no. of members: 22
- Member party: Liberal–National Coalition
- Status in legislature: Majority Coalition Government
- Opposition party: Labor
- Opposition leader: Luke Foley

History
- Election: 2015 state election
- Predecessor: First Baird ministry
- Successor: First Berejiklian ministry

The Second Baird ministry was the 95th ministry of the Government of New South Wales, and was led by Mike Baird, the state's 44th Premier. It is the second and subsequent of two occasions when Baird served as Premier.

The Liberal–National coalition ministry was formed following the 2015 state election where the Baird government was re-elected.

== Composition of ministry ==
Baird announced his ministry on 1 April 2015 and the ministry was sworn in on 2 April 2015 at Government House by the Governor of New South Wales David Hurley. The only change to the ministry was the resignation of Troy Grant as Deputy Premier in November 2016 following the loss of the Orange state by-election. John Barilaro replaced him as Leader of the National Party and Deputy Premier. (Note: Troy Grant resigned as Deputy Premier on 15 November 2016 following the loss of the Orange state by-election and was replaced by John Barilaro. Both Grant and Barilaro retained their portfolios.)

The ministry ended upon the resignation by Baird as Premier, and the swearing in of Gladys Berejiklian as the Premier and John Barilaro as Deputy Premier on 23 January 2017.

Portfolio	Minister	Party	Term commence	Term end	Term of office
Premier	Mike Baird (Note: Retained portfolio from the first Baird ministry.)	Liberal	2 April 2015	23 January 2017	1 year, 296 days
Minister for Western Sydney	Mike Baird	Liberal	2 April 2015	23 January 2017	1 year, 296 days
Deputy Premier	Troy Grant	National	2 April 2015	15 November 2016	1 year, 227 days
Minister for Justice and Police	Troy Grant	National	2 April 2015	23 January 2017	1 year, 296 days
Minister for the Arts	Troy Grant	National	2 April 2015	23 January 2017	1 year, 296 days
Minister for Racing	Troy Grant	National	2 April 2015	23 January 2017	1 year, 296 days
Deputy Premier	John Barilaro	National	15 November 2016	23 January 2017	69 days
Minister for Regional Development	John Barilaro	National	2 April 2015	23 January 2017	1 year, 296 days
Minister for Skills	John Barilaro	National	2 April 2015	23 January 2017	1 year, 296 days
Minister for Small Business	John Barilaro	National	2 April 2015	23 January 2017	1 year, 296 days
Treasurer	Gladys Berejiklian	Liberal	2 April 2015	23 January 2017	1 year, 296 days
Minister for Industrial Relations	Gladys Berejiklian	Liberal	2 April 2015	23 January 2017	1 year, 296 days
Minister for Education	Adrian Piccoli	National	2 April 2015	23 January 2017	1 year, 296 days
Minister for Roads, Maritime and Freight	Duncan Gay MLC	National	2 April 2015	23 January 2017	1 year, 296 days
Vice-President of the Executive Council; Leader of the Government in Legislative Council	Duncan Gay MLC	National	2 April 2015	23 January 2017	1 year, 296 days
Minister for Industry, Resources and Energy	Anthony Roberts	Liberal	2 April 2015	23 January 2017	1 year, 296 days
Minister for Health	Jillian Skinner	Liberal	2 April 2015	23 January 2017	1 year, 296 days
Minister for Transport and Infrastructure	Andrew Constance	Liberal	2 April 2015	23 January 2017	1 year, 296 days
Minister for Family and Community Services	Brad Hazzard	Liberal	2 April 2015	23 January 2017	1 year, 296 days
Minister for Social Housing	Brad Hazzard	Liberal	2 April 2015	23 January 2017	1 year, 296 days
Minister for Planning	Rob Stokes	Liberal	2 April 2015	23 January 2017	1 year, 296 days
Minister for Finance, Services and Property	Dominic Perrottet	Liberal	2 April 2015	23 January 2017	1 year, 296 days
Attorney General	Gabrielle Upton	Liberal	2 April 2015	23 January 2017	1 year, 296 days
Minister for Mental Health	Pru Goward	Liberal	2 April 2015	23 January 2017	1 year, 296 days
Minister for Medical Research	Pru Goward	Liberal	2 April 2015	23 January 2017	1 year, 296 days
Minister for Women	Pru Goward	Liberal	2 April 2015	23 January 2017	1 year, 296 days
Minister for Prevention of Domestic Violence and Sexual Assault	Pru Goward	Liberal	2 April 2015	23 January 2017	1 year, 296 days
Assistant Minister for Health	Pru Goward	Liberal	2 April 2015	23 January 2017	1 year, 296 days
Minister for Ageing	John Ajaka MLC	Liberal	2 April 2015	23 January 2017	1 year, 296 days
Minister for Disability Services	John Ajaka MLC	Liberal	2 April 2015	23 January 2017	1 year, 296 days
Minister for the Illawarra	John Ajaka MLC	Liberal	2 April 2015	23 January 2017	1 year, 296 days
Minister for Trade, Tourism and Major Events	Stuart Ayres	Liberal	2 April 2015	23 January 2017	1 year, 296 days
Minister for Sport	Stuart Ayres	Liberal	2 April 2015	23 January 2017	1 year, 296 days
Minister for Innovation and Better Regulation	Victor Dominello	Liberal	2 April 2015	23 January 2017	1 year, 296 days
Minister for Local Government	Paul Toole	National	2 April 2015	23 January 2017	1 year, 296 days
Minister for Primary Industries	Niall Blair MLC	National	2 April 2015	23 January 2017	1 year, 296 days
Minister for Lands and Water	Niall Blair MLC	National	2 April 2015	23 January 2017	1 year, 296 days
Minister for the Environment	Mark Speakman	Liberal	2 April 2015	23 January 2017	1 year, 296 days
Minister for Heritage	Mark Speakman	Liberal	2 April 2015	23 January 2017	1 year, 296 days
Assistant Minister for Planning	Mark Speakman	Liberal	2 April 2015	23 January 2017	1 year, 296 days
Minister for Corrections	David Elliott	Liberal	2 April 2015	23 January 2017	1 year, 296 days
Minister for Emergency Services	David Elliott	Liberal	2 April 2015	23 January 2017	1 year, 296 days
Minister for Veterans Affairs	David Elliott	Liberal	2 April 2015	23 January 2017	1 year, 296 days
Minister for Early Childhood Education	Leslie Williams	National	2 April 2015	23 January 2017	1 year, 296 days
Minister for Aboriginal Affairs	Leslie Williams	National	2 April 2015	23 January 2017	1 year, 296 days
Assistant Minister for Education	Leslie Williams	National	2 April 2015	23 January 2017	1 year, 296 days

Ministers are members of the Legislative Assembly unless otherwise noted.

== See also ==
- Members of the New South Wales Legislative Assembly, 2015–2019
- Members of the New South Wales Legislative Council, 2015–2019

== Notes ==
New South Wales government ministries
Preceded by First Baird ministry	Second Baird ministry 2015–2017	Succeeded by First Berejiklian ministry
