= Minister for Industry and Trade =

Australian politician in New South Wales

- Incumbent; Anoulack Chanthivong since 5 April 2023
- Premier's Department
- Style: The Honourable
- Nominator: Premier of New South Wales
- Appointer: Governor of New South Wales
- Inaugural holder: Jacob Garrard (as the Minister for Labour and Industry)
- Formation: 11 March 1895

The Minister for Industry and Trade is a minister in the Government of New South Wales who has responsibilities for sponsoring and supporting enterprise, trade, and international investment in the state of New South Wales, Australia. The minister is responsible for administering the portfolio through the Premier's Department.

Ultimately the minister is responsible to the Parliament of New South Wales.

== History ==
=== Labour and Industry (1895-1921) ===
The Minister for Labour and Industry portfolio was established in 1895 in the Reid ministry and held in conjunction with the Minister of Public Instruction. In 1921, in the first Dooley ministry, the portfolio of Labour and Industry was split into Labour and the new portfolio of State Industrial Enterprises. State Industrial Enterprises became the responsibility of the Minister for Railways. The responsibilities included - building construction, metal quarries, monier pipeworks, docks and workshops. The State Industrial Enterprises portfolio was abolished in 1925 in the first Lang ministry.

=== State Development (1986-2011) ===
The Minister for State Development was a minister in the New South Wales Government that sought to attract new investment into the State and to identify opportunities for existing NSW businesses, through providing services to the business sector and co-ordination services to the public sector to develop an internationally competitive economy in New South Wales.

The portfolio was abolished in 2011 with the formation of the O'Farrell ministry and its responsibilities were split between the portfolios of Trade and Investment and Regional Infrastructure and Services.

== List of ministers ==
=== Industry ===
The following individuals have served as the Minister for Industry, or any precedent titles:

Ministerial title	Minister	Party	Ministry	Term start	Term end	Time in office	Notes
Minister of Public Instruction; Minister for Labour and Industry	Jacob Garrard	Free Trade		11 March 1895	15 August 1898	3 years, 157 days	
Minister of Public Instruction; Minister for Labour and Industry	James Hogue	Free Trade		27 August 1898	13 September 1899	1 year, 17 days	
Minister of Public Instruction; Minister for Labour and Industry	John Perry	Protectionist		14 September 1899	27 March 1901	4 years, 274 days	
Minister of Public Instruction; Minister for Labour and Industry	John Perry	Progressive		28 March 1901	14 June 1904	4 years, 274 days	
Minister of Public Instruction; Minister for Labour and Industry	John Fegan	Progressive		17 June 1904	29 August 1904	73 days	
Minister of Public Instruction; Minister for Labour and Industry	Broughton O'Conor	Liberal Reform		29 August 1904	13 May 1907	2 years, 257 days	
Minister of Public Instruction; Minister for Labour and Industry	James Hogue	Liberal Reform		14 May 1907	1 October 1907	140 days	
Minister for Labour and Industry	William Wood	Liberal Reform		2 October 1907	21 January 1908	111 days	
Minister for Labour and Industry	James Hogue	Liberal Reform		22 January 1908	20 October 1910	2 years, 271 days	
Minister for Labour and Industry	George Beeby	Labor		21 October 1910	10 September 1911	324 days	
Minister for Labour and Industry	Campbell Carmichael	Labor		11 September 1911	26 November 1911	76 days	
Minister for Labour and Industry	George Beeby	Labor		27 November 1911	9 December 1912	1 year, 12 days	
Minister for Labour and Industry	Campbell Carmichael	Labor		10 December 1912	29 June 1913	201 days	
Minister for Labour and Industry	James McGowen	Labor		30 June 1913	29 January 1914	213 days	
Minister for Labour and Industry	John Estell	Labor		29 January 1914	31 October 1916	2 years, 276 days	
Minister for Labour and Industry	Henry Hoyle	Labor		31 October 1916	15 November 1916	15 days	
Minister for Labour and Industry	George Beeby	Nationalist		15 November 1916	23 July 1919	2 years, 250 days	
Minister for Labour and Industry	Augustus James	Nationalist		23 July 1919	12 April 1920	264 days	
Minister for Labour and Industry	George Cann	Labor		12 April 1920	10 October 1921	1 year, 181 days	
Minister of Public Instruction and Labour and Industry	Thomas Ley	Nationalist		20 December 1921	20 December 1921	7 hours	
Minister for Labour and Industry	Ernest Farrar	Nationalist		13 April 1922	17 June 1925	3 years, 65 days	
Minister for Labour and Industry	Jack Baddeley	Labor		17 June 1925	18 October 1927	2 years, 123 days	
Minister for Labour and Industry	Ernest Farrar	Nationalist		18 October 1927	3 November 1930	3 years, 16 days	
Minister for Labour and Industry	Jack Baddeley	Labor		4 November 1930	15 October 1931	345 days	
Minister for Labour and Industry	Jack Baddeley	Labor (NSW)		15 October 1931	13 May 1932	211 days	
Minister for Labour and Industry	John Dunningham	Nationalist		16 May 1932	26 May 1938	6 years, 10 days	
Minister for Labour and Industry	Alexander Mair	Nationalist		1 June 1938	13 October 1938	134 days	
Minister for Labour and Industry	Herbert Hawkins	Nationalist		13 October 1938	16 June 1939	246 days	
Minister for Labour and Industry	Athol Richardson	Nationalist		26 June 1939	5 August 1939	51 days	
Minister for Labour and Industry and Social Services	Athol Richardson	Nationalist		5 August 1939	16 August 1939	51 days	
Minister for Labour and Industry and Social Services	George Gollan	Nationalist		16 August 1939	16 May 1941	1 year, 273 days	
Minister for Labour and Industry and Social Services	Hamilton Knight	Labor		16 May 1941	6 February 1947	5 years, 266 days	
Minister for Labour and Industry and Social Welfare	Hamilton Knight	Labor		6 February 1947	29 October 1947	5 years, 266 days	
Minister for Labour and Industry and Social Welfare	Jack Baddeley	Labor		29 October 1947	9 March 1948	132 days	
Minister for Labour and Industry and Social Welfare	Frank Finnan	Labor		9 March 1948	30 June 1950	4 years, 351 days	
Minister for Labour and Industry	Frank Finnan	Labor		30 June 1950	23 February 1953	4 years, 351 days	
Minister for Labour and Industry	Abe Landa	Labor		23 February 1953	15 March 1956	3 years, 21 days	
Minister for Labour and Industry	Jim Maloney	Labor		15 March 1956	13 May 1965	9 years, 59 days	
Minister for Labour and Industry	Eric Willis	Liberal		13 May 1965	11 March 1971	5 years, 302 days	
Minister for Labour and Industry	Frederick Hewitt	Liberal		11 March 1971	14 May 1976	5 years, 64 days	
Minister for Industrial Development; Minister for Decentralisation	Don Day	Labor	Wran (3) (4) (5)	29 February 1980	10 February 1984	3 years, 347 days	
Minister for Industry and Decentralisation	George Paciullo	Labor	Wran (6)	10 February 1984	5 April 1984	55 days	
Minister for Industry and Decentralisation	Eric Bedford	Labor	Wran (7)	5 April 1984	31 December 1985	1 year, 270 days	
Minister for Industry and Decentralisation	Neville Wran	Labor	Wran (7)	1 January 1986	6 February 1986	36 days	
Minister for Industry and Small Business	Peter Cox	Labor	Wran (8); Unsworth	6 February 1986	26 November 1987	1 year, 293 days	
Minister for Commerce	John Della Bosca	Labor	Carr (4); Iemma (1)	2 April 2003	2 April 2007	4 years, 0 days	
Minister for Commerce	Eric Roozendaal	Labor	Iemma (2)	2 April 2007	5 September 2008	1 year, 156 days	
Minister for Commerce	Carmel Tebbutt	Labor	Rees	8 September 2008	14 September 2009	1 year, 6 days	
Minister for Commerce	Jodi McKay	Labor	Rees	14 September 2009	4 December 2009	81 days	
Minister for Commerce	John Robertson	Labor	Keneally	8 December 2009	21 May 2010	164 days	
Minister for Commerce	Paul Lynch	Labor	Keneally	21 May 2010	28 March 2011	311 days	
Minister for Industry, Resources and Energy	Anthony Roberts	Liberal	Baird (2)	2 April 2015	30 January 2017	1 year, 303 days	
Minister for Trade and Industry	Niall Blair	National	Berejiklian (1)	30 January 2017	2 April 2019	2 years, 62 days	
Minister for Regional New South Wales, Industry and Trade	John Barilaro	National	Berejiklian (2)	2 April 2019	6 October 2021	2 years, 187 days	
Minister for Trade and Industry	Stuart Ayres	Liberal	Perrottet (1)	6 October 2021	21 December 2021	76 days	
Treasurer	Daniel Mookhey	Labor	Minns	28 March 2023	5 April 2023	8 days	
Minister for Industry and Trade	Anoulack Chanthivong	Labor	Minns	5 April 2023	incumbent	3 years, 155 days	

=== Trade ===
The following individuals have served as the Minister for Trade, or any precedent titles:

Ministerial title	Minister	Party	Ministry	Term start	Term end	Time in office	Notes
Minister for Trade and Investment	Andrew Stoner	National	O'Farrell Baird (1)	4 April 2011	17 October 2014	3 years, 196 days	
Minister for Trade and Investment	Troy Grant	National	Baird (1)	17 October 2014	2 April 2015	167 days	
Minister for Trade, Tourism and Major Events	Stuart Ayres	Liberal	Baird (2)	2 April 2015	30 January 2017	1 year, 303 days	
Minister for Trade and Industry	Niall Blair	National	Berejiklian (1)	30 January 2017	2 April 2019	2 years, 62 days	
Minister for Regional New South Wales, Industry and Trade	John Barilaro	National	Berejiklian (2)	2 April 2019	6 October 2021	2 years, 187 days	
Minister for Trade and Industry	Stuart Ayres	Liberal	Perrottet (1)	6 October 2021	21 December 2021	301 days	
Minister for Enterprise, Investment and Trade	Stuart Ayres	Liberal	Perrottet (2)	21 December 2021	3 August 2022	301 days	
Minister for Enterprise, Investment and Trade	Alister Henskens	Liberal	Perrottet (2)	5 August 2022	28 March 2023	235 days	
Treasurer	Daniel Mookhey	Labor	Minns	28 March 2023	5 April 2023	8 days	
Minister for Industry and Trade	Anoulack Chanthivong	Labor	Minns	5 April 2023	incumbent	3 years, 155 days	

== Former ministerial titles ==
=== State Industrial Enterprises ===
The following individuals have served as the Minister for State Industrial Enterprises, or any equivalent titles:

Ministerial title	Minister	Party	Ministry	Term start	Term end	Time in office	Notes
Minister for State Industrial Enterprises	Carlo Lazzarini	Labor	Dooley (1)	10 October 1921	20 December 1921	71 days	
Minister for Business Undertakings	Stephen Perdriau	Nationalist	Fuller (1)	20 December 1921	20 December 1921	7 hours	
Minister for State Industrial Enterprises	Carlo Lazzarini	Labor	Dooley (2)	20 December 1921	13 April 1922	114 days	
Minister for Railways and State Industrial Enterprises	Sir Thomas Henley	Nationalist	Fuller (2)	13 April 1922	19 June 1922	67 days	
Minister for Railways and State Industrial Enterprises	Richard Ball	Nationalist	Fuller (2)	28 June 1922	17 June 1925	2 years, 354 days	

=== Decentralisation ===
The following individuals have served as the Minister for Decentralisation, or any equivalent titles:

Ministerial title	Minister	Party	Ministry	Term start	Term end	Time in office	Notes
Minister for Industrial Development and Decentralisation	Jack Renshaw	Labor	Heffron (2); Renshaw	14 March 1962	13 May 1965	3 years, 60 days	
Minister for Decentralisation and Development	John Fuller	Country	Askin (1) (2) (3) (4) (5)	13 May 1965	3 December 1973	8 years, 204 days	
Minister for Decentralisation and Development	Tim Bruxner	Country	Askin (6)	3 December 1973	23 January 1976	2 years, 51 days	
Minister for Decentralisation and Development	Milton Morris	Liberal	Lewis (1) (2) Willis	23 January 1976	14 May 1976	112 days	
Minister for Decentralisation and Development	Don Day	Labor	Wran (1)	14 May 1976	19 October 1978	2 years, 158 days	
Minister for Decentralisation	Jack Hallam	Labor	Wran (2)	19 October 1978	29 February 1980	1 year, 133 days	
Minister for Industrial Development; Minister for Decentralisation	Don Day	Labor	Wran (3) (4) (5)	29 February 1980	10 February 1984	3 years, 347 days	
Minister for Industry and Decentralisation	George Paciullo	Labor	Wran (6)	10 February 1984	5 April 1984	55 days	
Minister for Industry and Decentralisation	Eric Bedford	Labor	Wran (7)	5 April 1984	31 December 1985	1 year, 270 days	
Minister for Industry and Decentralisation	Neville Wran	Labor	Wran (7)	1 January 1986	6 February 1986	36 days	

=== State Development ===
Title	Minister	Party	Ministry	Term start	Term end	Time in office	Notes
Minister for State Development	Barrie Unsworth	Labor	Unsworth	4 July 1986	21 March 1988	1 year, 261 days	
Minister for State Development	Wal Murray	National	Greiner (1)	21 March 1988	24 July 1990	2 years, 125 days	
Minister for State Development	John Hannaford	Liberal	Greiner (1)	24 July 1990	6 June 1991	317 days	
Minister for State Development	Michael Yabsley	Liberal	Greiner (2)	6 June 1991	24 June 1992	1 year, 18 days	
Minister for State Development	Robert Webster	National	Fahey (1)	24 June 1992	3 July 1992	9 days	
Minister for State Development	Peter Collins	Liberal	Fahey (2)	3 July 1992	26 May 1993	327 days	
Minister for Economic Development	John Fahey	Liberal	Fahey (3)	26 May 1993	4 April 1995	1 year, 313 days	
Minister for State Development	Michael Egan	Labor	Carr (1)	4 April 1995	15 December 1995	255 days	
Minister for State and Regional Development	Michael Egan	Labor	Carr (1)	15 December 1995	1 December 1997	1 year, 351 days	
Minister for State Development	Michael Egan	Labor	Carr (2) (3) (4)	1 December 1997	21 January 2005	7 years, 51 days	
Minister for State Development	Andrew Refshauge	Labor	Iemma (1)	21 January 2005	3 August 2005	194 days	
Minister for State Development	John Watkins	Labor	Iemma (1)	3 August 2005	17 February 2006	198 days	
Minister for State Development	Morris Iemma	Labor	Iemma (1)	17 February 2006	2 April 2007	1 year, 44 days	
Minister for State Development	Ian Macdonald	Labor	Iemma (2)Rees	2 April 2007	17 November 2009	2 years, 229 days	
Minister for State Development	Eric Roozendaal	Labor	Keneally	17 November 2009	4 December 2009	17 days	
Minister for State and Regional Development	Ian Macdonald	Labor	Keneally	8 December 2009	5 June 2010	179 days	
Minister for State and Regional Development	Eric Roozendaal	Labor	Keneally	5 June 2010	28 March 2011	296 days	

=== Investment ===
The following individuals have served as the Minister for Investment, or any precedent titles:

Ministerial title	Minister	Party	Ministry	Term start	Term end	Time in office	Notes
Minister for Trade and Investment	Andrew Stoner	National	O'Farrell Baird (1)	4 April 2011	17 October 2014	3 years, 196 days	
Minister for Trade and Investment	Troy Grant	National	Baird (1)	17 October 2014	2 April 2015	167 days	
Minister for Jobs, Investment, Tourism and Western Sydney	Stuart Ayres	Liberal	Berejiklian (2); Perrottet (1)	2 April 2019	21 December 2021	3 years, 123 days	
Minister for Enterprise, Investment and Trade	Stuart Ayres	Liberal	Perrottet (2)	21 December 2021	3 August 2022	3 years, 123 days	
Minister for Enterprise, Investment and Trade	Alister Henskens	Liberal	Perrottet (2)	5 August 2022	28 March 2023	235 days	
Treasurer	Daniel Mookhey	Labor	Minns	28 March 2023	5 April 2023	8 days	
