= Carr ministry (1995–1997) =

85th New South Wales government ministry, led by Bob Carr

First Carr ministry
- 85th Cabinet of Government of New South Wales

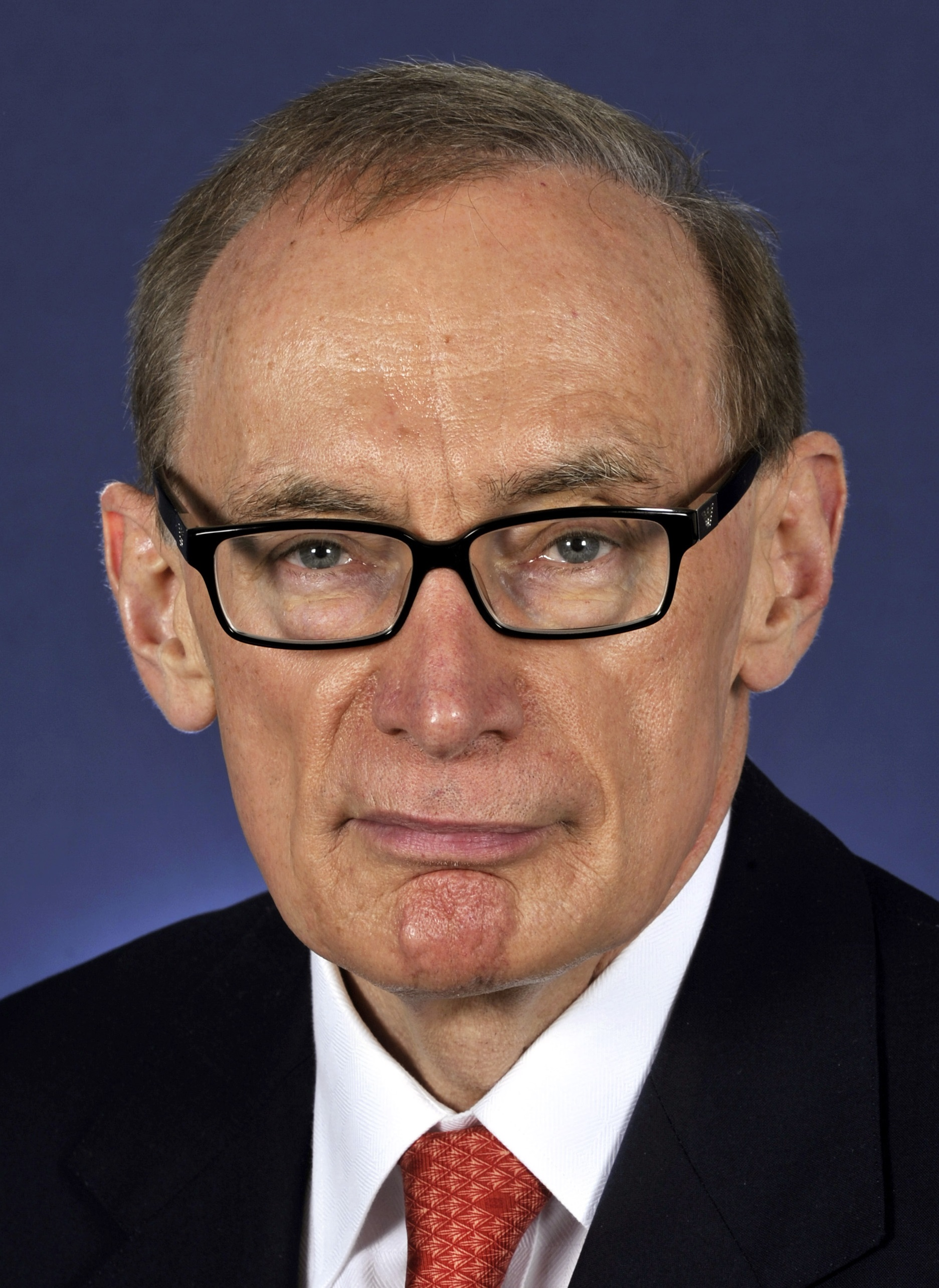
- Premier Bob Carr
- Date formed: 4 April 1995
- Date dissolved: 1 December 1997

People and organisations
- Monarch: Queen Elizabeth II
- Governor: Peter Sinclair; Gordon Samuels
- Premier: Bob Carr
- Deputy Premier: Andrew Refshauge
- No. of ministers: 20
- Member party: Labor
- Status in legislature: Majority Labor Government
- Opposition parties: Liberal–National coalition
- Opposition leader: Peter Collins

History
- Election: 1995 New South Wales state election
- Predecessor: Third Fahey ministry
- Successor: Second Carr ministry

The Carr ministry (1995–1997) or First Carr ministry was the 85th ministry of the New South Wales Government, and was led by the 39th Premier of New South Wales, Bob Carr, representing the Labor Party.

== Composition of ministry ==
The ministry covers the period from 4 April 1995, when Carr led Labor to victory at the 1995 state election. There were two new assistant roles created early in the ministry, (Note: On 7 June 1995 Carl Scully was appointed to a new role of Assistant Minister for Energy.) (Note: On 26 July 1995 John Aquilina was appointed to a new role of Minister Assisting the Premier on Youth Affairs.) a minor rearrangements in December 1995, (Note: On 6 December 1995 the portfolio of Consumer Affairs was renamed Fair Trading. Faye Lo Po' retained the portfolio.) (Note: On 15 December 1995 the portfolios of State Development and Small Business and Regional Development were amalgamated to become State and Regional Development. Michael Egan was appointed minister and Carl Scully appointed assistant minister.) (Note: On 15 December 1995 the portfolio of Public Works and Services was transferred from Michael Knight to Carl Scully.) a new assistant role in March 1996, (Note: On 13 March 1996 Bob Debus was appointed to a new role of Minister Assisting the Minister for the Arts.) and a minor rearrangement in December 1996. (Note: On 28 November 1996 the portfolio of Roads was transferred from Michael Knight to Carl Scully.) The ministry continued until 1 December 1997 when the second Carr ministry was formed.

Portfolio	Minister	Party	Term commence	Term end	Term of office
Premier	Bob Carr	Labor	4 April 1995	1 December 1997	2 years, 241 days
Minister for the Arts	Bob Carr	Labor	4 April 1995	1 December 1997	2 years, 241 days
Minister for Ethnic Affairs	Bob Carr	Labor	4 April 1995	1 December 1997	2 years, 241 days
Deputy Premier	Andrew Refshauge	Labor	4 April 1995	1 December 1997	2 years, 241 days
Minister for Health	Andrew Refshauge	Labor	4 April 1995	1 December 1997	2 years, 241 days
Minister for Aboriginal Affairs	Andrew Refshauge	Labor	4 April 1995	1 December 1997	2 years, 241 days
Treasurer	Michael Egan, MLC	Labor	4 April 1995	1 December 1997	2 years, 241 days
Minister for Energy	Michael Egan, MLC	Labor	4 April 1995	1 December 1997	2 years, 241 days
Minister Assisting the Premier	Michael Egan, MLC	Labor	4 April 1995	1 December 1997	2 years, 241 days
Vice-President of the Executive Council; Leader of the Government in Legislative Council	Michael Egan, MLC	Labor	4 April 1995	1 December 1997	2 years, 241 days
Minister for State Development	Michael Egan, MLC	Labor	4 April 1995	15 December 1995	255 days
Minister for State and Regional Development	Michael Egan, MLC	Labor	15 December 1995	1 December 1997	1 year, 351 days
Minister for Police	Paul Whelan	Labor	4 April 1995	1 December 1997	2 years, 241 days
Minister for Transport	Brian Langton	Labor	4 April 1995	1 December 1997	2 years, 241 days
Minister for Tourism	Brian Langton	Labor	4 April 1995	1 December 1997	2 years, 241 days
Minister for Education and Training	John Aquilina	Labor	4 April 1995	1 December 1997	2 years, 241 days
Minister Assisting the Premier on Youth Affairs	John Aquilina	Labor	26 July 1995	1 December 1997	2 years, 128 days
Minister for the Environment	Pam Allan	Labor	4 April 1995	1 December 1997	2 years, 241 days
Minister for the Olympics	Michael Knight	Labor	4 April 1995	1 December 1997	2 years, 241 days
Minister for Roads	Michael Knight	Labor	4 April 1995	28 November 1996	1 year, 238 days
Minister for Roads	Carl Scully	Labor	28 November 1996	15 December 1995	1 year, 3 days
Minister for Public Works and Services	Michael Knight	Labor	4 April 1995	15 December 1995	255 days
Minister for Public Works and Services	Carl Scully	Labor	15 December 1995	28 November 1996	349 days
Minister for Community Services	Ron Dyer, MLC	Labor	4 April 1995	1 December 1997	2 years, 241 days
Minister for Aged Services	Ron Dyer, MLC	Labor	4 April 1995	1 December 1997	2 years, 241 days
Minister for Disability Services	Ron Dyer, MLC	Labor	4 April 1995	1 December 1997	2 years, 241 days
Attorney General	Jeff Shaw, MLC	Labor	4 April 1995	1 December 1997	2 years, 241 days
Minister for Industrial Relations	Jeff Shaw, MLC	Labor	4 April 1995	1 December 1997	2 years, 241 days
Minister for Land and Water Conservation	Kim Yeadon	Labor	4 April 1995	1 December 1997	2 years, 241 days
Minister for Urban Affairs and Planning	Craig Knowles	Labor	4 April 1995	1 December 1997	2 years, 241 days
Minister for Housing	Craig Knowles	Labor	4 April 1995	1 December 1997	2 years, 241 days
Minister for Agriculture	Richard Amery	Labor	4 April 1995	1 December 1997	2 years, 241 days
Minister for Ports	Carl Scully	Labor	4 April 1995	1 December 1997	2 years, 241 days
Minister for Small Business and Regional Development	Carl Scully	Labor	4 April 1995	15 December 1995	255 days
Assistant Minister for State Development	Carl Scully	Labor	4 April 1995	15 December 1995	255 days
Assistant Minister for State and Regional Development	Carl Scully	Labor	15 December 1995	1 December 1997	1 year, 351 days
Assistant Minister for Energy	Carl Scully	Labor	7 June 1995	1 December 1997	2 years, 177 days
Minister for Corrective Services	Bob Debus	Labor	4 April 1995	1 December 1997	2 years, 241 days
Minister for Emergency Services	Bob Debus	Labor	4 April 1995	1 December 1997	2 years, 241 days
Minister Assisting the Minister for the Arts	Bob Debus	Labor	13 March 1996	1 December 1997	1 year, 263 days
Minister for Gaming and Racing	Richard Face	Labor	4 April 1995	1 December 1997	2 years, 241 days
Minister Assisting the Premier on Hunter Development	Richard Face	Labor	4 April 1995	1 December 1997	2 years, 241 days
Minister for Women	Faye Lo Po'	Labor	4 April 1995	1 December 1997	2 years, 241 days
Minister for Consumer Affairs	Faye Lo Po'	Labor	4 April 1995	6 December 1995	246 days
Minister for Fair Trading	Faye Lo Po'	Labor	6 December 1995	1 December 1997	1 year, 360 days
Minister for Mineral Resources	Bob Martin	Labor	4 April 1995	1 December 1997	2 years, 241 days
Minister for Fisheries	Bob Martin	Labor	4 April 1995	1 December 1997	2 years, 241 days
Minister for Sport and Recreation	Gabrielle Harrison	Labor	4 April 1995	1 December 1997	2 years, 241 days
Minister for Local Government	Ernie Page	Labor	4 April 1995	1 December 1997	2 years, 241 days

Ministers are members of the Legislative Assembly unless otherwise noted.

== See also ==
- Members of the New South Wales Legislative Assembly, 1995–1999
- Members of the New South Wales Legislative Council, 1995–1999

== Notes ==
New South Wales government ministries
Preceded by Fahey–Armstrong ministry	First Carr ministry 1995–1997	Succeeded by Second Carr ministry (1997–1999)
