= Fahey–Armstrong ministry =

84th New South Wales government ministry, led by John Fahey

- 84th Cabinet of Government of New South Wales
- Date formed: 26 May 1993
- Date dissolved: 4 April 1995

People and organisations
- Monarch: Queen Elizabeth II
- Governor: Peter Sinclair
- Premier: John Fahey
- Deputy Premier: Ian Armstrong
- No. of ministers: 22
- Ministers removed: 1
- Total no. of members: 21
- Member party: Liberal–National coalition
- Status in legislature: Minority Coalition Government
- Opposition parties: Labor
- Opposition leader: Bob Carr

History
- Outgoing election: 1995 New South Wales state election
- Predecessor: Second Fahey ministry
- Successor: First Carr ministry

The Fahey–Armstrong ministry or Third Fahey ministry was the 84th ministry of the New South Wales Government, and was led by the 38th Premier of New South Wales, John Fahey, representing the Liberal Party in coalition with the National Party, led by Ian Armstrong.

The ministry covers the period from 26 May 1993 until 4 April 1995, when the coalition was defeated at the 1995 state election by Labor, led by Bob Carr.

== Composition of ministry ==
The ministry commenced on 26 May 1993 and there was a single rearrangement in June 1994, when Terry Griffiths was forced to resign from both the ministry and the Liberal Party over claims of sexual harassment. (Note: Terry Griffiths was forced to resign from the ministry on 27 June 1994. Garry West was appointed to his portfolios of Police and Emergency Services.) (Note: Ted Pickering returned to the ministry, appointed to Garry West's portfolios of Energy, Government and Cooperatives.)

Portfolio	Minister	Party	Term commence	Term end	Term of office
Premier	John Fahey	Liberal	26 May 1993	4 April 1995	1 year, 313 days
Minister for Economic Development	John Fahey	Liberal	26 May 1993	4 April 1995	1 year, 313 days
Deputy Premier	Ian Armstrong	National	26 May 1993	4 April 1995	1 year, 313 days
Minister for Public Works	Ian Armstrong	National	26 May 1993	4 April 1995	1 year, 313 days
Minister for Ports	Ian Armstrong	National	26 May 1993	4 April 1995	1 year, 313 days
Minister for Transport (Note: Retained portfolio from the second Fahey ministry.)	Bruce Baird	Liberal	26 May 1993	4 April 1995	1 year, 313 days
Minister for Roads	Bruce Baird	Liberal	26 May 1993	4 April 1995	1 year, 313 days
Minister for Land and Water Conservation	George Souris	National	26 May 1993	4 April 1995	1 year, 313 days
Attorney General	John Hannaford, MLC	Liberal	26 May 1993	4 April 1995	1 year, 313 days
Minister for Justice	John Hannaford, MLC	Liberal	26 May 1993	4 April 1995	1 year, 313 days
Vice-President of the Executive Council; Leader of the Government in Legislative Council	John Hannaford, MLC	Liberal	26 May 1993	4 April 1995	1 year, 313 days
Minister for Planning	Robert Webster, MLC	National	26 May 1993	4 April 1995	1 year, 313 days
Minister for Housing	Robert Webster, MLC	National	26 May 1993	4 April 1995	1 year, 313 days
Minister for Energy	Garry West	National	26 May 1993	27 June 1994	1 year, 32 days
Minister for Energy	Ted Pickering, MLC	National	27 June 1994	4 April 1995	281 days
Minister for Local Government and Cooperatives	Garry West	National	26 May 1993	27 June 1994	1 year, 32 days
Minister for Local Government and Cooperatives	Ted Pickering, MLC	National	27 June 1994	4 April 1995	281 days
Minister for Education, Training and Youth Affairs	Virginia Chadwick, MLC	Liberal	26 May 1993	4 April 1995	1 year, 313 days
Minister for Tourism	Virginia Chadwick, MLC	Liberal	26 May 1993	4 April 1995	1 year, 313 days
Minister Assisting the Premier	Virginia Chadwick, MLC	Liberal	26 May 1993	4 April 1995	1 year, 313 days
Treasurer	Peter Collins	Liberal	26 May 1993	4 April 1995	1 year, 313 days
Minister for the Arts	Peter Collins	Liberal	26 May 1993	4 April 1995	1 year, 313 days
Minister for Health	Ron Phillips	Liberal	26 May 1993	4 April 1995	1 year, 313 days
Minister for Industrial Relations and Employment	Kerry Chikarovski	Liberal	26 May 1993	4 April 1995	1 year, 313 days
Minister for the Status of Women	Kerry Chikarovski	Liberal	26 May 1993	4 April 1995	1 year, 313 days
Minister for Agriculture and Fisheries	Ian Causley	National	26 May 1993	4 April 1995	1 year, 313 days
Minister for Mines	Ian Causley	National	26 May 1993	4 April 1995	1 year, 313 days
Minister for Police	Terry Griffiths	Liberal	26 May 1993	27 June 1994	1 year, 32 days
Minister for Police	Garry West	National	27 June 1994	4 April 1995	281 days
Minister for Emergency Services	Terry Griffiths	Liberal	26 May 1993	27 June 1994	1 year, 32 days
Minister for Emergency Services	Garry West	National	27 June 1994	4 April 1995	281 days
Minister for Community Services	Jim Longley	Liberal	26 May 1993	4 April 1995	1 year, 313 days
Minister for Aboriginal Affairs	Jim Longley	Liberal	26 May 1993	4 April 1995	1 year, 313 days
Minister for the Ageing	Jim Longley	Liberal	6 October 1993	4 April 1995	1 year, 180 days
Minister for the Environment	Chris Hartcher	Liberal	26 May 1993	4 April 1995	1 year, 313 days
Chief Secretary	Anne Cohen	Liberal	26 May 1993	4 April 1995	1 year, 313 days
Minister for Administrative Services	Anne Cohen	Liberal	26 May 1993	4 April 1995	1 year, 313 days
Minister for Multicultural and Ethnic Affairs	Michael Photios	Liberal	26 May 1993	4 April 1995	1 year, 313 days
Minister Assisting the Minister for Justice	Michael Photios	Liberal	26 May 1993	4 April 1995	1 year, 313 days
Minister for Consumer Affairs	Wendy Machin	National	26 May 1993	4 April 1995	1 year, 313 days
Minister Assisting the Minister for Roads	Wendy Machin	National	26 May 1993	4 April 1995	1 year, 313 days
Minister Assisting the Minister for Transport	Wendy Machin	National	6 October 1993	4 April 1995	1 year, 180 days
Minister for Sport, Recreation and Racing	Chris Downey	Liberal	26 May 1993	4 April 1995	1 year, 313 days
Minister for Small Business	Ray Chappell	National	26 May 1993	4 April 1995	1 year, 313 days
Minister for Regional Development	Ray Chappell	National	26 May 1993	4 April 1995	1 year, 313 days

Ministers are members of the Legislative Assembly unless otherwise noted.

== See also ==
- Members of the New South Wales Legislative Assembly, 1991–1995
- Members of the New South Wales Legislative Council, 1991–1995

== Notes ==
New South Wales government ministries
Preceded by Fahey–Murray ministry (1992–1993)	Fahey–Armstrong ministry 1993–1995	Succeeded by Carr ministry (1995–1997)
