= Minister for Sport (New South Wales) =

- Incumbent; Steve Kamper since 5 April 2023
- Department of Creative Industries, Tourism, Hospitality and Sport
- Style: The Honourable
- Nominator: Premier of New South Wales
- Appointer: Governor of New South Wales
- Inaugural holder: Eric Willis (as the Minister for Tourism and Sport)
- Formation: 11 March 1971

The Minister for Sport is a minister in the Government of New South Wales with responsibilities for the administration and support for all sporting bodies in the state of New South Wales, Australia. It has often been combined with other portfolio responsibilities, most commonly Tourism.

== Scope ==
=== Minister for Culture, Sport and Recreation (1975-1976) ===
The formation of the ministry and supporting department was a response to the Government’s growing involvement in leisure and sporting activities. Included in these activities were sport, recreation, the visual arts and crafts, and the performing arts. Some of the government controls relating to motor, horse and greyhound racing, Sunday entertainment and the Sydney Cricket and Sports Ground were also transferred to the new Department from the Chief Secretary, although the Chief Secretary’s successor, the Department of Services, continued to provide the administrative staff for many of these activities.

The responsibilities of the portfolio included the Advisory Committee on Cultural Grants, Art Gallery of New South Wales, the Archives Authority of New South Wales, the Library and Library Board of New South Wales, Museums, Film Council, Observatory and Opera House and the sport and recreation service of New South Wales. The last organisation aimed to promote physical fitness and recreational opportunities which was achieved by providing camping facilities, swimming instruction, school vacation play centres.

The ministry was abolished in the first Wran ministry in 1976, separated into the portfolio of Sport and Recreation and while cultural activities became the responsibility of the Premier.

== List of ministers ==
The following individuals have served as minister where sport was one of the responsibilities in the portfolio:

Title	Minister	Party	Ministry	Term start	Term end	Time in office	Notes
Minister for Tourism and Sport	Eric Willis	Liberal	Askin (4)	11 March 1971	19 June 1972	1 year, 100 days	
Minister for Sport	Ian Griffith	Liberal	Askin (4) (5) (6)	19 June 1972	3 January 1975	2 years, 198 days	
Minister for Culture, Sport and Recreation	John Barraclough	Liberal	Lewis (1) (2)	3 January 1975	23 January 1976	1 year, 20 days	
Minister for Culture, Sport and Recreation	David Arblaster (Note: Concurrently Minister for Tourism.)	Liberal	Willis	23 January 1976	14 May 1976	112 days	
Minister for Sport and Recreation	Ken Booth	Labor	Wran (1) (2) (3)	14 May 1976	2 October 1981	5 years, 141 days	
Minister for Sport and Recreation	Michael Cleary	Labor	Wran (4)	2 October 1981	26 May 1982	6 years, 171 days	
Minister for Leisure, Sport and Tourism	Michael Cleary	Labor	Wran (4) (5)	26 May 1982	10 February 1984	6 years, 171 days	
Minister for Sport and Recreation	Michael Cleary	Labor	Wran (6) (7) (8); Unsworth	10 February 1984	21 March 1988	6 years, 171 days	
Minister for Sport, Recreation and Racing	Bob Rowland Smith	National	Greiner (1)	25 March 1988	18 September 1989	3 years, 60 days	
Minister for Sport and Recreation	Bob Rowland Smith	National	Greiner (1)	18 September 1989	24 May 1991	3 years, 60 days	
Minister for Sport, Recreation and Racing	George Souris	National	Greiner (2); Fahey (1)	6 June 1991	3 July 1992	1 year, 27 days	
Minister for Sport, Recreation and Racing	Joe Schipp	Liberal	Fahey (2)	3 July 1992	26 May 1993	327 days	
Minister for Sport, Recreation and Racing	Christopher Downy	Liberal	Fahey (3)	26 May 1993	4 April 1995	1 year, 313 days	
Minister for Sport and Recreation	Gabrielle Harrison	Labor	Carr (1) (2)	4 April 1995	8 April 1999	4 years, 4 days	
Minister for Sport and Recreation	John Watkins	Labor	Carr (3)	8 April 1999	21 November 2001	2 years, 227 days	
Minister for Sport and Recreation	Morris Iemma	Labor	Carr (3)	21 November 2001	2 April 2003	1 year, 132 days	
Minister for Tourism and Sport and Recreation	Sandra Nori	Labor	Carr (4); Iemma (1)	2 April 2003	2 April 2007	4 years, 0 days	
Minister for Sport and Recreation	Graham West	Labor	Iemma (2)	2 April 2007	5 September 2008	1 year, 156 days	
Minister for Sport and Recreation	Kevin Greene	Labor	Rees; Keneally	5 September 2008	28 March 2011	2 years, 204 days	
Minister for Sport and Recreation	Graham Annesley	Liberal	O'Farrell	3 April 2011	28 August 2013	2 years, 147 days	
Minister for Sport and Recreation	Gabrielle Upton	Liberal	O'Farrell	30 August 2013	23 April 2014	236 days	
Minister for Sport and Recreation	Stuart Ayres (Note: Stuart Ayres held the Tourism portfolio from 2 April 2015 until 30 January 2017.)	Liberal	Baird (1)	23 April 2014	2 April 2015	4 years, 334 days	
Minister for Sport	Stuart Ayres	Liberal	Baird (2); Berejiklian (1)	2 April 2015	23 March 2019	4 years, 334 days	
Minister for Sport, Multiculturalism, Seniors and Veterans	John Sidoti	Liberal	Berejiklian (2)	2 April 2019	17 September 2019	168 days	
Minister for Sport, Multiculturalism, Seniors and Veterans	Geoff Lee (acting)	Liberal	Berejiklian (2)	17 September 2019	27 May 2021	1 year, 232 days	
Minister for Sport, Multiculturalism, Seniors and Veterans	Natalie Ward	Liberal	Berejiklian (2); Perrottet (1)	27 May 2021	21 December 2021	208 days	
Minister for Tourism and Sport	Stuart Ayres	Liberal	Perrottet (2)	21 December 2021	3 August 2022	225 days	
Minister for Sport	Alister Henskens	Liberal	Perrottet (2)	5 August 2022	28 March 2023	235 days	
Minister for Transport	Jo Haylen	Labor	Minns	28 March 2023	5 April 2023	8 days	
Minister for Sport	Steve Kamper	Labor	Minns	5 April 2023	incumbent	3 years, 155 days	

== See also ==
- List of New South Wales government agencies
- Minister for Sport (Australia)
  - Minister for Sport (Victoria)
  - Minister for Sport and Recreation (Northern Territory)
  - Minister for Sport and Recreation (Western Australia)
