= Carr ministry (1997–1999) =

86th ministry of the New South Wales Government

Second Carr ministry
- 86th Cabinet of Government of New South Wales

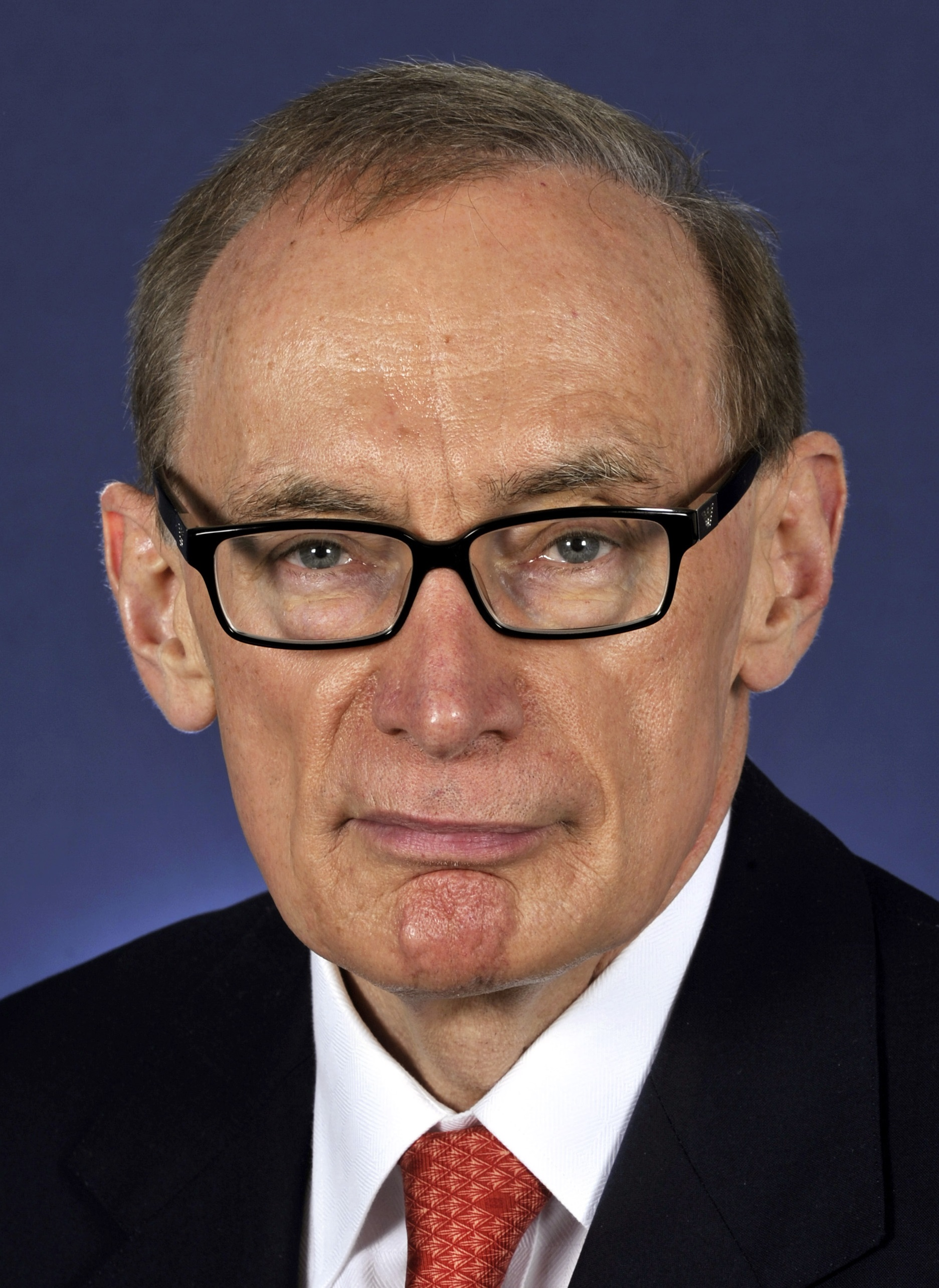
- Premier Bob Carr
- Date formed: 1 December 1997
- Date dissolved: 8 April 1999

People and organisations
- Monarch: Queen Elizabeth II
- Governor: Gordon Samuels
- Premier: Bob Carr
- Deputy Premier: Andrew Refshauge
- No. of ministers: 21
- Ministers removed: 1
- Total no. of members: 20
- Member party: Labor
- Status in legislature: Majority Labor Government
- Opposition parties: Liberal–National coalition
- Opposition leader: Peter Collins (1997–1998); Kerry Chikarovski (1998–1999)

History
- Outgoing election: 1999 New South Wales state election
- Predecessor: First Carr ministry
- Successor: Third Carr ministry

The Carr ministry (1997–1999) or Second Carr ministry was the 86th ministry of the New South Wales Government, and was led by the 39th Premier of New South Wales, Bob Carr, representing the Labor Party.

The ministry covered the period from 1 December 1997 until 8 April 1999, when Carr led Labor to victory at the 1999 state election.

== Composition of ministry ==
The ministry covered the period from 1 December 1997. There was a minor rearrangement in April 1998 when Brian Langton relinquished his ministerial duties due to his involvement in a political scandal, after the Independent Commission Against Corruption (ICAC) found him guilty of corruptly rorting charter plane expenses. The ICAC deemed that Langton had sought advantage for himself by deliberate deception of the Parliamentary Accounts Department. (Note: Brian Langton resigned on 30 April 1998. Jeff Shaw was appointed to his portfolio of Fair Trading and Bob Debus was appointed to his portfolio of Emergency Services.) The ministry continued until 8 April 1999 when the ministry was configured following the 1999 state election.

Portfolio	Minister	Party	Term commence	Term end	Term of office
Premier	Bob Carr (Note: Retained portfolio from the first Carr ministry.)	Labor	1 December 1997	8 April 1999	1 year, 128 days
Minister for the Arts	Bob Carr	Labor	1 December 1997	8 April 1999	1 year, 128 days
Minister for Ethnic Affairs	Bob Carr	Labor	1 December 1997	8 April 1999	1 year, 128 days
Deputy Premier	Andrew Refshauge	Labor	1 December 1997	8 April 1999	1 year, 128 days
Minister for Health	Andrew Refshauge	Labor	1 December 1997	8 April 1999	1 year, 128 days
Minister for Aboriginal Affairs	Andrew Refshauge	Labor	1 December 1997	8 April 1999	1 year, 128 days
Treasurer	Michael Egan, MLC	Labor	1 December 1997	8 April 1999	1 year, 128 days
Minister for State Development	Michael Egan, MLC	Labor	1 December 1997	8 April 1999	1 year, 128 days
Vice-President of the Executive Council; Leader of the Government in Legislative Council	Michael Egan, MLC	Labor	1 December 1997	8 April 1999	1 year, 128 days
Minister for Police	Paul Whelan	Labor	1 December 1997	8 April 1999	1 year, 128 days
Minister for the Olympics	Michael Knight	Labor	1 December 1997	8 April 1999	1 year, 128 days
Minister for Fair Trading	Brian Langton	Labor	1 December 1997	30 April 1998	150 days
Minister for Fair Trading	Jeff Shaw, MLC	Labor	30 April 1998	8 April 1999	343 days
Minister for Emergency Services	Brian Langton	Labor	1 December 1997	30 April 1998	150 days
Minister for Emergency Services	Bob Debus	Labor	30 April 1998	8 April 1999	343 days
Minister for Education and Training	John Aquilina	Labor	1 December 1997	8 April 1999	1 year, 128 days
Minister Assisting the Premier on Youth Affairs	John Aquilina	Labor	1 December 1997	8 April 1999	1 year, 128 days
Attorney General	Jeff Shaw, MLC	Labor	1 December 1997	8 April 1999	1 year, 128 days
Minister for Industrial Relations	Jeff Shaw, MLC	Labor	1 December 1997	8 April 1999	1 year, 128 days
Minister for the Environment	Pam Allan	Labor	1 December 1997	8 April 1999	1 year, 128 days
Minister for Information Technology	Kim Yeadon	Labor	1 December 1997	8 April 1999	1 year, 128 days
Minister for Forestry	Kim Yeadon	Labor	1 December 1997	8 April 1999	1 year, 128 days
Minister for Ports	Kim Yeadon	Labor	1 December 1997	8 April 1999	1 year, 128 days
Minister Assisting the Premier on Western Sydney	Kim Yeadon	Labor	1 December 1997	8 April 1999	1 year, 128 days
Minister for Urban Affairs and Planning	Craig Knowles	Labor	1 December 1997	8 April 1999	1 year, 128 days
Minister for Housing	Craig Knowles	Labor	1 December 1997	8 April 1999	1 year, 128 days
Minister for Transport	Carl Scully	Labor	1 December 1997	8 April 1999	1 year, 128 days
Minister for Roads	Carl Scully	Labor	1 December 1997	8 April 1999	1 year, 128 days
Minister for Agriculture	Richard Amery	Labor	1 December 1997	8 April 1999	1 year, 128 days
Minister for Land and Water Conservation	Richard Amery	Labor	1 December 1997	8 April 1999	1 year, 128 days
Minister for Energy	Bob Debus	Labor	1 December 1997	8 April 1999	1 year, 128 days
Minister for Tourism	Bob Debus	Labor	1 December 1997	8 April 1999	1 year, 128 days
Minister for Corrective Services	Bob Debus	Labor	1 December 1997	8 April 1999	1 year, 128 days
Minister Assisting the Minister for the Arts	Bob Debus	Labor	1 December 1997	8 April 1999	1 year, 128 days
Minister for Community Services	Faye Lo Po'	Labor	1 December 1997	8 April 1999	1 year, 128 days
Minister for Aging	Faye Lo Po'	Labor	1 December 1997	8 April 1999	1 year, 128 days
Minister for Disability Services	Faye Lo Po'	Labor	1 December 1997	8 April 1999	1 year, 128 days
Minister for Women	Faye Lo Po'	Labor	1 December 1997	8 April 1999	1 year, 128 days
Minister for Regional Development	Harry Woods	Labor	1 December 1997	8 April 1999	1 year, 128 days
Minister for Rural Affairs	Harry Woods	Labor	1 December 1997	8 April 1999	1 year, 128 days
Minister for Public Works and Services	Ron Dyer, MLC	Labor	1 December 1997	8 April 1999	1 year, 128 days
Minister for Gaming and Racing	Richard Face	Labor	1 December 1997	8 April 1999	1 year, 128 days
Minister Assisting the Premier on Hunter Development	Richard Face	Labor	1 December 1997	8 April 1999	1 year, 128 days
Minister for Mineral Resources	Bob Martin	Labor	1 December 1997	8 April 1999	1 year, 128 days
Minister for Fisheries	Bob Martin	Labor	1 December 1997	8 April 1999	1 year, 128 days
Minister for Sport and Recreation	Gabrielle Harrison	Labor	1 December 1997	8 April 1999	1 year, 128 days
Minister for Local Government	Ernie Page	Labor	1 December 1997	8 April 1999	1 year, 128 days

Ministers are members of the Legislative Assembly unless otherwise noted.

== See also ==
- Members of the New South Wales Legislative Assembly, 1995–1999
- Members of the New South Wales Legislative Council, 1995–1999

== Notes ==
New South Wales government ministries
Preceded by First Carr ministry (1995–1997)	Second Carr ministry 1997–1999	Succeeded by Third Carr ministry (1999–2003)
