= Carr ministry (1999–2003) =

87th ministry of the New South Wales Government

Third Carr ministry
- 87th Cabinet of Government of New South Wales

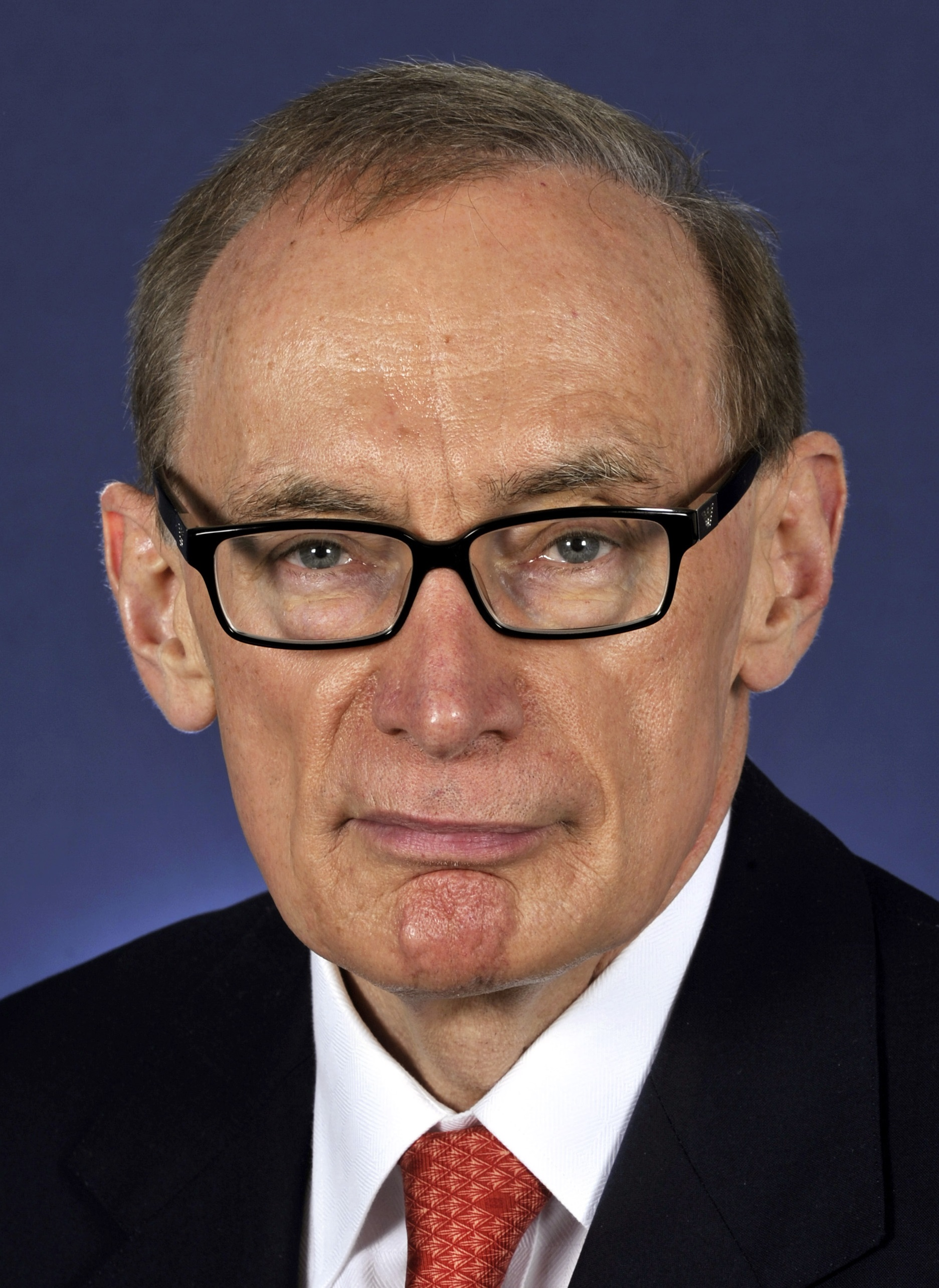
- Premier Bob Carr
- Date formed: 8 April 1999
- Date dissolved: 3 April 2003

People and organisations
- Monarch: Queen Elizabeth II
- Governor: Gordon Samuels; Marie Bashir
- Premier: Bob Carr
- Deputy Premier: Andrew Refshauge
- No. of ministers: 21
- Member party: Labor
- Status in legislature: Majority Labor Government
- Opposition parties: Liberal–National coalition
- Opposition leader: Kerry Chikarovski (1999–2002); John Brogden (2002–2003)

History
- Election: 1999 New South Wales state election
- Outgoing election: 2003 New South Wales state election
- Predecessor: Second Carr ministry
- Successor: Fourth Carr ministry

The Carr ministry (1999–2003) or Third Carr ministry was the 87th ministry of the New South Wales Government, and was led by the 39th Premier of New South Wales, Bob Carr, representing the Labor Party.

The ministry covered the period from 8 April 1999, when Carr led Labor to victory at the 1999 state election, until 3 April 2003, when Carr's Labor government was re-elected at the 2003 state election. As of 2023, this is the last term of Parliament in which the elected Premier of New South Wales has served the full term.

== Composition of ministry ==
The ministry was announced on 8 April 1999 and two new roles were created in March 2000. (Note: John Della Bosca assigned additional roles to assist the Premier on Public Sector Management and the Central Coast.) In June 2000 Jeff Shaw resigned from parliament to be appointed a judge of the Supreme Court, resulting in a reconfiguration of the ministry. (Note: Jeff Shaw resigned from parliament to be appointed a judge of the Supreme Court. He was replaces as Attorney General by Bob Debus and John Della Bosca replaced him as Minister for Industrial Relations.) Having spent more than five years as the Minister for the Olympics organising the Sydney Olympics in September 2000, Michael Knight retired from parliament in January 2001. (Note: Michael Knight retired from parliament on 12 January 2001 and his Olympics portfolio was abolished) (Note: Bob Debus was replaced as Minister for Corrective Services by John Watkins.) In November 2001 Paul Whelan resigned from the ministry. (Note: Paul Whelan resigned as Minister for Police on 21 November 2001 and was replaced by Michael Costa, who entered the ministry.) (Note: The portfolio of Urban Affairs and Planning was renamed Planning and Andrew Refshauge remained minister.) (Note: John Aquilina gained the portfolio of Land and Water Conservation from Richard Amery and Fair Trading from John Watkins who took on Aquilina's portfolio of Education and Training.) (Note: Richard Amery gained the portfolio of Corrective Services from John Watkins and lost Land and Water Conservation to John Aquilina.) (Note: Morris Iemma gained the portfolio of Sport and Recreation from John Watkins.) (Note: John Watkins was promoted to the portfolio of Education and Training from John Aquilina and gave up Fair Trading to Aquilina, Corrective Services to Richard Amery and Sport and Recreation to Morris Iemma.) The fourth re-arrangement occurred in July 2002, when Faye Lo Po' retired from the ministry. (Note: Faye Lo Po' retired from the ministry on 11 July 2002 and was replaced as Minister for Women by Sandra Nori. Lo Po's other portfolios of Community Services, Aging and Disability Services were transferred to Carmel Tebbutt.) Richard Face had announced that he would not contest the 2003 election and retired from the ministry in February 2003. (Note: Richard Face retired from the ministry on 13 February 2003, with his portfolios of Gaming and Racing and Assisting the Premier on Hunter Development allocated to Michael Egan.) The ministry was replaced by the Fourth Carr ministry following the 2003 election.

| Portfolio | Minister | Party | Term commence | Term end | Term of office |
|---|---|---|---|---|---|
| Premier | Bob Carr (Note: Retained portfolio from the first Carr ministry.) | Labor | 8 April 1999 | 2 April 2003 | 3 years, 359 days |
| Minister for the Arts | Bob Carr | Labor | 8 April 1999 | 2 April 2003 | 3 years, 359 days |
| Minister for Ethnic Affairs | Bob Carr | Labor | 8 April 1999 | 2 April 2003 | 3 years, 359 days |
| Deputy Premier | Andrew Refshauge | Labor | 8 April 1999 | 2 April 2003 | 3 years, 359 days |
| Minister for Aboriginal Affairs | Andrew Refshauge | Labor | 8 April 1999 | 2 April 2003 | 3 years, 359 days |
| Minister for Housing | Andrew Refshauge | Labor | 8 April 1999 | 2 April 2003 | 3 years, 359 days |
| Minister for Urban Affairs and Planning | Andrew Refshauge | Labor | 8 April 1999 | 21 November 2001 | 2 years, 227 days |
| Minister for Planning | Andrew Refshauge | Labor | 21 November 2001 | 2 April 2003 | 1 year, 132 days |
| Treasurer | Michael Egan, MLC | Labor | 8 April 1999 | 2 April 2003 | 3 years, 359 days |
| Minister for State Development | Michael Egan, MLC | Labor | 8 April 1999 | 2 April 2003 | 3 years, 359 days |
| Vice-President of the Executive Council; Leader of the Government in Legislative Council | Michael Egan, MLC | Labor | 8 April 1999 | 2 April 2003 | 3 years, 359 days |
| Minister for Police | Paul Whelan | Labor | 8 April 1999 | 21 November 2001 | 2 years, 227 days |
| Minister for Police | Michael Costa, MLC | Labor | 21 November 2001 | 2 April 2003 | 1 year, 132 days |
| Minister for the Olympics | Michael Knight | Labor | 8 April 1999 | 12 January 2001 | 1 year, 279 days |
| Minister for Health | Craig Knowles | Labor | 8 April 1999 | 2 April 2003 | 3 years, 359 days |
| Minister for Education and Training | John Aquilina | Labor | 8 April 1999 | 21 November 2001 | 2 years, 227 days |
| Minister for Education and Training | John Watkins | Labor | 21 November 2001 | 2 April 2003 | 1 year, 132 days |
| Attorney General | Jeff Shaw, MLC | Labor | 8 April 1999 | 28 June 2000 | 1 year, 81 days |
| Attorney General | Bob Debus | Labor | 28 June 2000 | 2 April 2003 | 2 years, 278 days |
| Minister for Industrial Relations | Jeff Shaw, MLC | Labor | 8 April 1999 | 28 June 2000 | 1 year, 81 days |
| Minister for Industrial Relations | John Della Bosca, MLC | Labor | 28 June 2000 | 2 April 2003 | 2 years, 278 days |
| Minister for Transport | Carl Scully | Labor | 8 April 1999 | 2 April 2003 | 3 years, 359 days |
| Minister for Roads | Carl Scully | Labor | 8 April 1999 | 2 April 2003 | 3 years, 359 days |
| Minister for Community Services | Faye Lo Po' | Labor | 8 April 1999 | 11 July 2002 | 3 years, 94 days |
| Minister for Community Services | Carmel Tebbutt | Labor | 11 July 2002 | 2 April 2003 | 265 days |
| Minister for Aging | Faye Lo Po' | Labor | 8 April 1999 | 11 July 2002 | 3 years, 94 days |
| Minister for Aging | Carmel Tebbutt | Labor | 11 July 2002 | 2 April 2003 | 265 days |
| Minister for Disability Services | Faye Lo Po' | Labor | 8 April 1999 | 11 July 2002 | 3 years, 94 days |
| Minister for Disability Services | Carmel Tebbutt | Labor | 11 July 2002 | 2 April 2003 | 265 days |
| Minister for Women | Faye Lo Po' | Labor | 8 April 1999 | 11 July 2002 | 3 years, 94 days |
| Minister for Women | Sandra Nori | Labor | 11 July 2002 | 2 April 2003 | 265 days |
| Minister for Information Technology | Kim Yeadon | Labor | 8 April 1999 | 2 April 2003 | 3 years, 359 days |
| Minister for Forestry | Kim Yeadon | Labor | 8 April 1999 | 2 April 2003 | 3 years, 359 days |
| Minister for Ports | Kim Yeadon | Labor | 8 April 1999 | 2 April 2003 | 3 years, 359 days |
| Minister for Western Sydney | Kim Yeadon | Labor | 8 April 1999 | 2 April 2003 | 3 years, 359 days |
| Minister for Agriculture | Richard Amery | Labor | 8 April 1999 | 2 April 2003 | 3 years, 359 days |
| Minister for Land and Water Conservation | Richard Amery | Labor | 8 April 1999 | 21 November 2001 | 2 years, 227 days |
| Minister for Land and Water Conservation | John Aquilina | Labor | 21 November 2001 | 2 April 2003 | 1 year, 132 days |
| Minister for the Environment | Bob Debus | Labor | 8 April 1999 | 2 April 2003 | 3 years, 359 days |
| Minister for Emergency Services | Bob Debus | Labor | 8 April 1999 | 2 April 2003 | 3 years, 359 days |
| Minister Assisting the Premier on the Arts | Bob Debus | Labor | 8 April 1999 | 2 April 2003 | 3 years, 359 days |
| Minister for Corrective Services | Bob Debus | Labor | 8 April 1999 | 12 January 2001 | 1 year, 279 days |
| Minister for Corrective Services | John Watkins | Labor | 12 January 2001 | 21 November 2001 | 313 days |
| Minister for Corrective Services | Richard Amery | Labor | 21 November 2001 | 2 April 2003 | 1 year, 132 days |
| Minister for Local Government | Harry Woods | Labor | 8 April 1999 | 2 April 2003 | 3 years, 359 days |
| Minister for Regional Development | Harry Woods | Labor | 8 April 1999 | 2 April 2003 | 3 years, 359 days |
| Minister for Rural Affairs | Harry Woods | Labor | 8 April 1999 | 2 April 2003 | 3 years, 359 days |
| Minister for Gaming and Racing | Richard Face | Labor | 8 April 1999 | 13 February 2003 | 3 years, 311 days |
| Minister for Gaming and Racing | Michael Egan, MLC | Labor | 13 February 2003 | 2 April 2003 | 48 days |
| Minister Assisting the Premier on Hunter Development | Richard Face | Labor | 8 April 1999 | 13 February 2003 | 3 years, 311 days |
| Minister Assisting the Premier on Hunter Development | Michael Egan, MLC | Labor | 13 February 2003 | 2 April 2003 | 48 days |
| Special Minister of State | John Della Bosca, MLC | Labor | 8 April 1999 | 2 April 2003 | 3 years, 359 days |
| Assistant Treasurer | John Della Bosca, MLC | Labor | 8 April 1999 | 2 April 2003 | 3 years, 359 days |
| Minister Assisting the Premier on Public Sector Management | John Della Bosca, MLC | Labor | 31 March 2000 | 2 April 2003 | 3 years, 2 days |
| Minister Assisting the Premier for the Central Coast | John Della Bosca, MLC | Labor | 31 March 2000 | 2 April 2003 | 3 years, 2 days |
| Minister for Public Works and Services | Morris Iemma | Labor | 8 April 1999 | 2 April 2003 | 3 years, 359 days |
| Minister Assisting the Premier on Citizenship | Morris Iemma | Labor | 8 April 1999 | 2 April 2003 | 3 years, 359 days |
| Minister for Small Business | Sandra Nori | Labor | 8 April 1999 | 2 April 2003 | 3 years, 359 days |
| Minister for Tourism | Sandra Nori | Labor | 8 April 1999 | 2 April 2003 | 3 years, 359 days |
| Minister for Mineral Resources | Eddie Obeid, MLC | Labor | 8 April 1999 | 2 April 2003 | 3 years, 359 days |
| Minister for Fisheries | Eddie Obeid, MLC | Labor | 8 April 1999 | 2 April 2003 | 3 years, 359 days |
| Minister for Fair Trading | John Watkins | Labor | 8 April 1999 | 21 November 2001 | 2 years, 227 days |
| Minister for Fair Trading | John Aquilina | Labor | 21 November 2001 | 2 April 2003 | 1 year, 132 days |
| Minister for Sport and Recreation | John Watkins | Labor | 8 April 1999 | 21 November 2001 | 2 years, 227 days |
| Minister for Sport and Recreation | Morris Iemma | Labor | 21 November 2001 | 2 April 2003 | 1 year, 132 days |
| Minister for Juvenile Justice | Carmel Tebbutt MLC | Labor | 8 April 1999 | 2 April 2003 | 3 years, 359 days |
| Minister Assisting the Premier on Youth | Carmel Tebbutt MLC | Labor | 8 April 1999 | 2 April 2003 | 3 years, 359 days |
| Minister Assisting the Minister for the Environment | Carmel Tebbutt MLC | Labor | 8 April 1999 | 11 July 2002 | 3 years, 94 days |

Ministers are members of the Legislative Assembly unless otherwise noted.

== See also ==
- Members of the New South Wales Legislative Assembly, 1999–2003
- Members of the New South Wales Legislative Council, 1999–2003

== Notes ==
New South Wales government ministries
| Preceded by Carr ministry (1997–1999) | Third Carr ministry 1999–2003 | Succeeded by Carr ministry (2003–2005) |
