= Minister for Disability Inclusion =

Government minister in New South Wales, Australia

- Incumbent; Kate Washington since 5 April 2023
- Department of Communities and Justice
- Style: The Honourable
- Appointer: Governor of New South Wales
- Inaugural holder: Ron Dyer
- Formation: 4 April 1995

The Minister for Disability Inclusion is a minister of the Government of New South Wales with responsibility for social policy and welfare, including matters relating disability in the state of New South Wales, Australia.

The Minister since 5 April 2023 is Kate Washington who also holds the Families and Communities portfolio.

Collectively the ministers administer the portfolio through the Department of Communities and Justice and a range of other government agencies.

== List of ministers ==
Ministerial title	Minister	Party	Ministry	Term start	Term end	Time in office	Notes
Minister for Disability Services	Ron Dyer	Labor	Carr (1)	4 April 1995	1 December 1997	2 years, 241 days	
Minister for Disability Services	Faye Lo Po'	Labor	Carr (2)	1 December 1997	8 April 1999	4 years, 222 days	
Minister for Disability Services	Faye Lo Po'	Labor	Carr (3)	8 April 1999	11 July 2002	4 years, 222 days	
Minister for Disability Services	Carmel Tebbutt	Labor	Carr (3)	11 July 2002	3 April 2003	2 years, 266 days	
Minister for Disability Services	Carmel Tebbutt	Labor	Carr (4)	3 April 2003	21 January 2005	2 years, 266 days	
Minister for Disability Services	John Della Bosca	Labor	Carr (4)	21 January 2005	3 August 2005	2 years, 71 days	
Minister for Disability Services	John Della Bosca	Labor	Iemma (1)	3 August 2005	2 April 2007	2 years, 71 days	
Minister for Disability Services	Kristina Keneally	Labor	Iemma (2)	2 April 2007	5 September 2008	1 year, 156 days	
Minister for Disability Services	Paul Lynch	Labor	Rees	8 September 2008	4 December 2009	1 year, 255 days	
Minister for Disability Services	Paul Lynch	Labor	Keneally	4 December 2009	21 May 2010	1 year, 255 days	
Minister for Disability Services	Peter Primrose	Labor	Keneally	21 May 2010	28 March 2011	311 days	
Minister for Disability Services	Andrew Constance	Liberal	O'Farrell	3 April 2011	2 August 2013	2 years, 121 days	
Minister for Disability Services	John Ajaka	Liberal	O'Farrell	2 August 2013	17 April 2014	3 years, 181 days	
Minister for Disability Services	John Ajaka	Liberal	Baird (1) (2)	23 April 2014	30 January 2017	3 years, 181 days	
Minister for Disability Services	Ray Williams	Liberal	Berejiklian (1)	30 January 2017	23 March 2019	2 years, 62 days	
Minister for Families, Communities and Disability Services	Gareth Ward	Liberal	Berejiklian (2)	2 April 2019	14 May 2021	2 years, 42 days	
Minister for Families, Communities and Disability Services	Alister Henskens	Liberal	Berejiklian (2); Perrottet (1)	27 May 2021	21 December 2021	208 days	
Minister for Disability Services (Note: Natasha Maclaren-Jones also held the Families and Communities portfolio.)	Natasha Maclaren-Jones	Liberal	Perrottet (2)	21 December 2021	28 March 2023	1 year, 97 days	
Minister for the Environment	Penny Sharpe	Labor	Minns	28 March 2023	5 April 2023	8 days	
Minister for Disability Inclusion (Note: Kate Washington also holds the Families and Communities portfolio.)	Kate Washington	Labor	Minns	5 April 2023	incumbent	3 years, 227 days	

== See also ==
- List of New South Wales government agencies
