= Minister for Women (New South Wales) =

Government minister in New South Wales, Australia

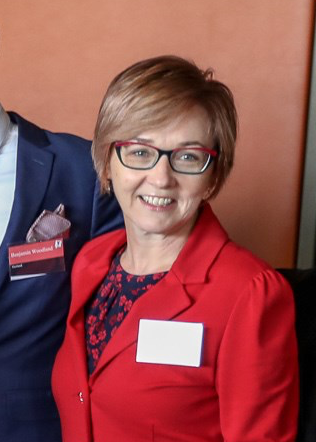
- Incumbent; Jodie Harrison since 5 April 2023
- Department of Communities and Justice
- Style: The Honourable
- Appointer: Governor of New South Wales
- Inaugural holder: Kerry Chikarovski (as Minister for the Status of Women)
- Formation: 26 May 1993

The Minister for Women is a minister in the Government of New South Wales with responsibility for women's issues in New South Wales, Australia.

There had been a Women’s Co-ordination Unit and a Women’s Advisory Council since at least 1977 for which the Premier and later the Minister for Families and Communities had been responsible. In 1993 in the third Fahey ministry these functions were brought together in a portfolio aimed at changing the portrayal of women, improving their status at home, at work and in the community, and reducing violence against women. From the first Carr ministry it was renamed Minister for Women. A separate portfolio of Prevention of Domestic Violence and Sexual Assault was created in the second Baird ministry.

The portfolio became part of the portfolio of Mental Health, Regional Youth and Women in the second Berejiklian ministry and returned as stane alone portfolio in the second Perrottet ministry. The current minister, since 5 April 2023, is Jodie Harrison serving in the Minns ministry. The minister supports the Attorney General in the administration of that portfolio through the Department of Communities and Justice and a range of other government agencies.

Ultimately, the ministers are responsible to the Parliament of New South Wales.

== List of ministers ==
Title	Minister	Party	Ministry	Term start	Term end	Time in office	Notes
Minister for the Status of Women	Kerry Chikarovski	Liberal	Fahey (3)	26 May 1993	4 April 1995	1 year, 313 days	
Minister for Women	Faye Lo Po'	Labor	Carr (1) (2) (3)	4 April 1995	2 April 2003	7 years, 363 days	
Minister for Women	Sandra Nori	Labor	Carr (4); Iemma (1)	2 April 2003	2 April 2007	4 years, 0 days	
Minister for Women	Verity Firth	Labor	Iemma (2); Rees	2 April 2007	14 September 2009	2 years, 165 days	
Minister for Women	Linda Burney	Labor	Rees	14 September 2009	4 December 2009	81 days	
Minister for Women	Jodi McKay	Labor	Keneally	8 December 2009	28 March 2011	1 year, 110 days	
Minister for Women	Pru Goward	Liberal	O'Farrell; Baird (1) (2)	3 April 2011	30 January 2017	5 years, 302 days	
Minister for Women	Tanya Davies	Liberal	Berejiklian (1)	30 January 2017	23 March 2019	2 years, 52 days	
Minister for Mental Health, Regional Youth and Women	Bronnie Taylor	National	Berejiklian (2); Perrottet (1)	2 April 2019	21 December 2021	3 years, 360 days	
Minister for Women	Bronnie Taylor	National	Perrottet (2)	21 December 2021	28 March 2023	3 years, 360 days	
Minister for Women	Jodie Harrison	Labor	Minns	5 April 2023	incumbent	3 years, 227 days	

== Related ministerial titles ==
=== Prevention of Domestic Violence and Sexual Assault ===
The following individuals have served as for the Prevention of Domestic Violence and Sexual Assault or any precedent titles:

Title	Minister	Party	Ministry	Term start	Term end	Time in office	Notes
Minister for Prevention of Domestic Violence and Sexual Assault	Pru Goward	Liberal	Berejiklian (1)	2 April 2015	23 March 2019	3 years, 355 days	
Minister for the Prevention of Domestic Violence	Mark Speakman	Liberal	Berejiklian (2)	2 April 2019	27 May 2021	2 years, 263 days	
Minister for Prevention of Domestic and Sexual Violence	Mark Speakman	Liberal	Berejiklian (2); Perrottet (1)	27 May 2021	21 December 2021	2 years, 263 days	
Minister for Women's Safety and the Prevention of Domestic and Sexual Violence	Natalie Ward	Liberal	Perrottet (2)	21 December 2021	28 March 2023	1 year, 97 days	
Minister for the Environment	Penny Sharpe	Labor	Minns	28 March 2023	5 April 2023	8 days	
Minister for the Prevention of Domestic Violence and Sexual Assault	Jodie Harrison	Labor	Minns	5 April 2023	incumbent	3 years, 227 days	

== See also ==
- Minister for Women (Australia)
- Minister for Women (Victoria)
- List of New South Wales government agencies
