= Minister for Jobs and Tourism =

Government minister in New South Wales, Australia

- Incumbent; Steve Kamper since 17 March 2025
- Department of Creative Industries, Tourism, Hospitality and Sport
- Style: The Honourable
- Nominator: Premier of New South Wales
- Appointer: Governor of New South Wales
- Inaugural holder: Clive Evatt (as Minister in Charge of Tourist Activities and Immigration)
- Formation: 9 May 1946

The Minister for Jobs and Tourism is a minister in the Government of New South Wales with responsibilities for tourism in the state of New South Wales, Australia. Tourism has often been combined with other portfolio responsibilities, most commonly Sport.

The Minister in Charge of Tourist Activities and Immigration was a ministry in the government of New South Wales, responsible for promoting New South Wales as a place to visit and encouraging migration through its offices in London, and for the management of government-owned resorts. It was created in 1946 and abolished in 1950.

== Role and responsibilities ==
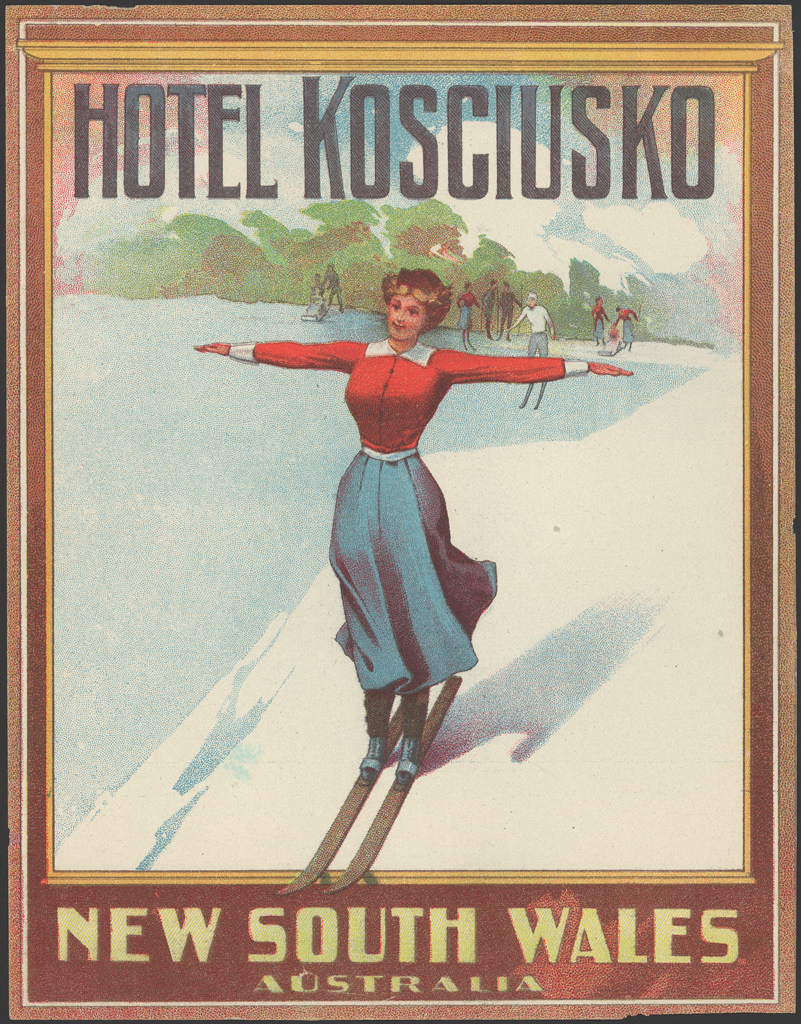
Hotel Kosciusko brochure showing female skier with red top and blue skirt

A government agency responsible for tourism and immigration was first created in 1905, the Intelligence Department, whose duties were "designed to make the attractions and possibilities of the State better known at home and a abroad, and to promote settlement on the land and to encourage immigration". It was renamed the Immigration and Tourist Bureau in 1908. In 1919 the bureau was divided into two separate agencies, with immigration becoming the responsibility of the Minister for Labour and Industry while the Tourist Bureau was the responsibility of the Chief Secretary. In 1938 Management of the Tourist Bureau was transferred to the Department of Railways. The responsibilities of the Tourist Bureau were managing the tourist resorts at Jenolan Caves, Jenolan Caves House, Abercrombie Caves, Yarrangobilly Caves, Wombeyan Caves and Hotel Kosciusko. (Note: The Hotel Kosciusko was opened in 1909 and burnt down in 1951. All that remains is the staff quarters which is now Sponars Chalet, near Smiggin Holes..) The also conducted tours and published promotional material on NSW tourist attractions.

The elevation of tourist activities to a ministerial level was controversial. The Premier William McKell stated that there was a need for a Minister to devote himself to these matters and that "It is becoming increasingly, recognised, not only here but throughout the world, that we have much to offer the tourist, but to take full advantage of our opportunities we must take active steps to organise the trade and provide the facilities required". The Sydney Morning Herald criticised the unnecessary cost of the portfolio, stating there was no justification for the new office as immigration was a commonwealth matter and the political sphere was the worst way to develop tourist activities.

The portfolio was abolished in the third McGirr ministry, with a new portfolio of immigration, while tourism ceased to be represented at a ministerial level until the fourth Cahill ministry in 1959.

== List of ministers ==
=== Jobs ===
Minister for Employment was a title which existed beside Industrial Relations in the Wran and Unsworth ministries. Employment continued at a portfolio as part of composite portfolios until the Third Fahey ministry in 1995 when it was merged into the Industrial relations portfolio.

The portfolio was responsible for developing and managing job creation programs, to advise the government on the employment impacts of its policies and to analyse the labour market with particular interest in the effects of structural change and constraints in employment growth. Employment had not previously been represented in a portfolio.

The following individuals have served as Minister where Employment was one of the responsibilities in the portfolio:

Title	Minister	Party	Ministry	Term start	Term end	Time in office	Notes
Minister for Employment	Laurie Brereton	Labor	Wran (6)	10 February 1984	5 April 1984	55 days	
Minister for Employment	Bob Debus	Labor	Wran (7) (8)	5 April 1984	4 July 1986	2 years, 90 days	
Minister for Employment; Minister for Industrial Relations	Pat Hills	Labor	Unsworth	4 July 1986	21 March 1988	1 year, 261 days	
Minister for Industrial Relations and Employment	John Fahey	Liberal	Greiner (1)	25 March 1988	24 July 1990	2 years, 121 days	
Minister for Further Education, Training and Employment; Minister for Industrial Relations	John Fahey	Liberal	Greiner (1) (2); Fahey (1)	24 July 1990	3 July 1992	1 year, 345 days	
Minister for Employment and Training	Virginia Chadwick	Liberal	Fahey (2)	3 July 1992	26 May 1993	327 days	
Minister for Industrial Relations and Employment	Kerry Chikarovski	Liberal	Fahey (3)	26 May 1993	4 April 1995	1 year, 313 days	
Minister for Jobs, Investment, Tourism and Western Sydney	Stuart Ayres	Liberal	Berejiklian	2 April 2019	21 December 2021	2 years, 263 days	
Minister for Jobs and Tourism	John Graham	Labor	Minns	6 April 2023	17 March 2025	3 years, 224 days	
Minister for Jobs and Tourism	Steve Kamper	Labor	Minns	17 March 2025	Incumbent	1 year, 244 days	

=== Tourism ===
The following individuals have served as minister where tourism was one of the responsibilities in the portfolio:

Title	Minister	Party	Ministry	Term start	Term end	Time in office	Notes
Minister in Charge of Tourist Activities and Immigration	Clive Evatt	Labor	McKell (2)	9 May 1946	6 February 1947	273 days	
Minister in Charge of Tourist Activities and Immigration	Frank Finnan	Labor	McGirr (1) (2)	6 February 1947	9 March 1948	1 year, 32 days	
Minister in Charge of Tourist Activities and Immigration	Claude Matthews	Labor	McGirr (2)	9 March 1948	21 September 1949	1 year, 196 days	
Minister in Charge of Tourist Activities and Immigration	Joshua Arthur	Labor	McGirr (2)	21 September 1949	30 June 1950	282 days	
Minister for Tourist Activities	Gus Kelly	Labor	Cahill (4); Heffron (1) (2); Renshaw	1 April 1959	13 May 1965	6 years, 42 days	
Minister for Tourist Activities	Eric Willis	Liberal	Askin (1)	13 May 1965	5 March 1968	7 years, 37 days	
Minister for Tourism	Eric Willis	Liberal	Askin (2) (3) (4)	5 March 1968	11 March 1971	7 years, 37 days	
Minister for Tourism and Sport	Eric Willis	Liberal	Askin (4)	11 March 1971	19 June 1972	7 years, 37 days	
Minister for Tourism	Tom Lewis	Liberal	Askin (4) (5) (6)	19 June 1972	3 January 1975	2 years, 198 days	
Minister for Tourism	Charles Cutler	National	Lewis (1)	3 January 1975	16 December 1975	347 days	
Minister for Tourism	Tim Bruxner	National	Lewis (2)	17 December 1975	23 January 1976	37 days	
Minister for Tourism	David Arblaster (Note: Concurrently Minister for Sport.)	Liberal	Willis	23 January 1976	14 May 1976	112 days	
Minister for Tourism	Ken Booth	Labor	Wran (1) (2) (3)	14 May 1976	2 October 1981	5 years, 141 days	
Minister for Tourism	Michael Cleary	Labor	Wran (4)	2 October 1981	26 May 1982	6 years, 175 days	
Minister for Leisure, Sport and Tourism	Michael Cleary	Labor	Wran (4) (5)	26 May 1982	10 February 1984	6 years, 175 days	
Minister for Tourism	Michael Cleary	Labor	Wran (6) (7) (8); Unsworth	10 February 1984	25 March 1988	6 years, 175 days	
Minister for Tourism	Garry West	National	Greiner (1)	25 March 1988	6 June 1991	3 years, 73 days	
Minister for Tourism	Michael Yabsley	Liberal	Greiner (2)	6 June 1991	24 June 1992	1 year, 18 days	
Minister for Tourism	Robert Webster	National	Fahey (1)	24 June 1992	3 July 1992	9 days	
Minister for Tourism	Bruce Baird	Liberal	Fahey (2)	3 July 1992	26 May 1993	327 days	
Minister for Tourism	Virginia Chadwick	Liberal	Fahey (3)	26 May 1993	4 April 1995	1 year, 313 days	
Minister for Tourism	Brian Langton	Labor	Carr (1)	4 April 1995	1 December 1997	2 years, 241 days	
Minister for Tourism	Bob Debus	Labor	Carr (2)	1 December 1997	8 April 1999	1 year, 128 days	
Minister for Tourism	Sandra Nori	Labor	Carr (3)	8 April 1999	2 April 2003	7 years, 359 days	
Minister for Tourism, Sport and Recreation	Sandra Nori	Labor	Carr (4); Iemma (1)	2 April 2003	2 April 2007	7 years, 359 days	
Minister for Tourism	Matt Brown	Labor	Iemma (2)	2 April 2007	5 September 2008	1 year, 156 days	
Minister for Tourism	Jodi McKay	Labor	Rees; Keneally	8 September 2008	28 March 2011	2 years, 201 days	
Minister for Tourism, Major Events, Hospitality and Racing	George Souris	National	O'Farrell	4 April 2011	23 April 2014	3 years, 19 days	
Minister for Tourism and Major Events	Andrew Stoner	National	Baird (1)	23 April 2014	17 October 2014	177 days	
Minister for Tourism and Major Events	Troy Grant	National	Baird (1)	17 October 2014	2 April 2015	167 days	
Minister for Trade, Tourism and Major Events	Stuart Ayres	Liberal	Baird (2)	2 April 2015	30 January 2017	1 year, 303 days	
Minister for Tourism and Major Events	Adam Marshall	National	Berejiklian (1)	30 January 2017	23 March 2019	2 years, 52 days	
Minister for Jobs, Investment, Tourism and Western Sydney	Stuart Ayres	Liberal	Berejiklian (2); Perrottet (1)	2 April 2019	21 December 2021	3 years, 123 days	
Minister for Tourism and Sport	Stuart Ayres	Liberal	Perrottet (2)	21 December 2021	3 August 2022	3 years, 123 days	
Minister for Tourism	Ben Franklin	National	Perrottet (2)	5 August 2022	28 March 2023	235 days	
Minister for the Arts	John Graham	Labor	Minns	28 March 2023	6 April 2023	3 years, 233 days	
Minister for Jobs and Tourism	John Graham	Labor	Minns	6 April 2023	17 March 2025	3 years, 233 days	
Minister for Jobs and Tourism	Steve Kamper	Labor	Minns	17 March 2025	Incumbent	1 year, 244 days	

== Former ministerial titles ==
=== Major events ===
The Minister for Major Events was a ministry first established in 2010 in the Keneally ministry and combined with Tourism and Gaming and Racing in the O'Farrell ministry. Major Events was abolished as a portfolio title in the second Berejiklian ministry.

The first minister with specific responsibility for a major event was Michael Knight as the Minister for Olympics, following the success of the Sydney bid to host the 2000 Summer Olympics. The minister concurrently held the portfolios of Public Works and Services and Roads and was closely linked to the provisions of buildings and infrastructure for the event.

The portfolio of Major Events was not responsible for a department, nor any legislation, with the Major Events Act 2009 remaining the responsibility of the Premier. The first minister, Ian Macdonald, also held the portfolios of State and Regional Development, Mineral and Forest Resources, and Central Coast. In 2011 the portfolio was absorbed by the new portfolio of Tourism, Major Events, Hospitality and Racing and remained a named part of portfolios until 2019 when it became part of the portfolio of Jobs, Investment, Tourism and Western Sydney.

The following individuals have served as minister before major events was combined with tourism:

Title	Minister	Party	Ministry	Term start	Term end	Time in office	Notes
Minister for the Olympics	Michael Knight	Labor	Carr (1)	4 April 1995	12 January 2001	5 years, 283 days	
Minister for Major Events	Ian Macdonald	Labor	Keneally	11 March 2010	5 June 2010	86 days	
Minister for Major Events	Kevin Greene	Labor	Keneally	5 June 2010	28 March 2011	296 days	
Minister for Tourism, Major Events, Hospitality and Racing	George Souris	National	O'Farrell	4 April 2011	23 April 2014	3 years, 19 days	
Minister for Tourism and Major Events	Andrew Stoner	National	Baird (1)	23 April 2014	17 October 2014	177 days	
Minister for Tourism and Major Events	Troy Grant	National	Baird (1)	17 October 2014	2 April 2015	167 days	
Minister for Trade, Tourism and Major Events	Stuart Ayres	Liberal	Baird (2)	2 April 2015	30 January 2017	1 year, 303 days	
Minister for Tourism and Major Events	Adam Marshall	National	Berejiklian (1)	30 January 2017	23 March 2019	2 years, 52 days	

=== Assistant ministers ===
Title	Minister	Party	Ministry	Term start	Term end	Time in office	Notes
Assistant Minister for Tourism and Major Events	Katrina Hodgkinson	National	O'Farrell	23 April 2014	17 October 2014	177 days	
Minister for Regional Tourism	John Barilaro	National	Baird (1)	17 October 2014	2 April 2015	167 days	

== See also ==
- List of New South Wales government agencies
- Minister for Tourism (Australia)
  - Minister for Tourism (Victoria)
  - Minister for Tourism (Western Australia)
