= Minister for Industrial Relations (New South Wales) =

Cabinet position in New South Wales

- Incumbent; Sophie Cotsis since 5 April 2023
- Department of Premier and Cabinet and New South Wales Treasury
- Style: The Honourable
- Nominator: Premier of New South Wales
- Appointer: Governor of New South Wales
- Inaugural holder: Jacob Garrard (as the Minister for Labour and Industry)
- Formation: 11 March 1895

The Minister for Industrial Relations is a Minister of the Crown in the Government of New South Wales who has responsibilities for matters relating to industrial and labour laws and regulation in the state of New South Wales, Australia. The portfolio was established in 1895 in the Reid ministry and titled Minister for Labour and Industry, held in conjunction with the Minister of Public Instruction. The minister is responsible for assisting the Premier and the Treasurer in the administration of their respective clusters.

Ultimately the Minister is responsible to the Parliament of New South Wales.

== History ==
The 1890s in New South Wales were a period of depression, with soaring unemployment and poverty, accompanied by industrial disputes and strikes, such as the bitter and prolonged 1890 Australian maritime dispute, the 1891 and 1894 shearers' strikes and the 1892 Broken Hill miners' strike.The Government Labour Bureau was established in February 1892 in response to the soaring unemployment and poverty brought on by the depression, with its principal tasks being in finding work for the unemployed and assisting families. There was also a legislative response, such as Trade Disputes Conciliation and Arbitration Act 1892, Apprentices Act 1894, and the Factories and Shops Act 1896.

The portfolio was established to be responsible for industrial registration, safety in the workplace, and the labour exchange, including the Government Labour Bureau.

Industrial relations in NSW was affected by the WorkChoices legislation and the Fair Work Act, which saw the Commonwealth assume responsibility for private sector employment matters. In 2017 Industrial Relations came within The Treasury and the portfolio was abolished in 2019 and merged into the portfolio of Minister for the Public Service and Employee Relations, Aboriginal Affairs, and the Arts. At the time of its abolition, the minister was Dominic Perrottet, who was also the Treasurer, since 30 January 2017.

The ministry was reestablished in December 2021.

== List of ministers ==
Minister	Party	Ministerial title	Term start	Term end	Time in office	Notes
Jacob Garrard	Free Trade	Minister of Public Instruction; Minister for Labour and Industry	11 March 1895	15 August 1898	3 years, 157 days	
James Hogue	Free Trade	Minister of Public Instruction; Minister for Labour and Industry	27 August 1898	13 September 1899	1 year, 17 days	
John Perry	Protectionist	Minister of Public Instruction; Minister for Labour and Industry	14 September 1899	27 March 1901	4 years, 274 days	
John Perry	Progressive	Minister of Public Instruction; Minister for Labour and Industry	28 March 1901	14 June 1904	4 years, 274 days	
John Fegan	Progressive	Minister of Public Instruction; Minister for Labour and Industry	17 June 1904	29 August 1904	73 days	
Broughton O'Conor	Liberal Reform	Minister of Public Instruction; Minister for Labour and Industry	29 August 1904	13 May 1907	2 years, 257 days	
James Hogue	Liberal Reform	Minister of Public Instruction; Minister for Labour and Industry	14 May 1907	1 October 1907	140 days	
William Wood	Liberal Reform	Minister for Labour and Industry	2 October 1907	21 January 1908	111 days	
James Hogue	Liberal Reform	Minister for Labour and Industry	22 January 1908	20 October 1910	2 years, 271 days	
George Beeby	Labor	Minister for Labour and Industry	21 October 1910	10 September 1911	324 days	
Campbell Carmichael	Labor	Minister for Labour and Industry	11 September 1911	26 November 1911	76 days	
George Beeby	Labor	Minister for Labour and Industry	27 November 1911	9 December 1912	1 year, 12 days	
Campbell Carmichael	Labor	Minister for Labour and Industry	10 December 1912	29 June 1913	201 days	
James McGowen	Labor	Minister for Labour and Industry	30 June 1913	29 January 1914	213 days	
John Estell	Labor	Minister for Labour and Industry	29 January 1914	31 October 1916	2 years, 276 days	
Henry Hoyle	Labor	Minister for Labour and Industry	31 October 1916	15 November 1916	15 days	
George Beeby	Nationalist	Minister for Labour and Industry	15 November 1916	23 July 1919	2 years, 250 days	
Augustus James	Nationalist	Minister for Labour and Industry	23 July 1919	12 April 1920	264 days	
George Cann	Labor	Minister for Labour and Industry	12 April 1920	10 October 1921	1 year, 181 days	
Greg McGirr	Labor	Minister for Labour	10 October 1921	20 December 1921	71 days	
Thomas Ley	Nationalist	Minister of Public Instruction and Labour and Industry	20 December 1921	20 December 1921	7 hours	
Edward Kavanagh	Labor	Minister for Labour	20 December 1921	13 April 1922	114 days	
Ernest Farrar	Nationalist	Minister for Labour and Industry	13 April 1922	17 June 1925	3 years, 65 days	
Jack Baddeley	Labor	Minister for Labour and Industry	17 June 1925	18 October 1927	2 years, 123 days	
Ernest Farrar	Nationalist	Minister for Labour and Industry	18 October 1927	3 November 1930	3 years, 16 days	
Jack Baddeley	Labor	Minister for Labour and Industry	4 November 1930	15 October 1931	345 days	
Jack Baddeley	Labor (NSW)	Minister for Labour and Industry	15 October 1931	13 May 1932	211 days	
John Dunningham	Nationalist	Minister for Labour and Industry	16 May 1932	26 May 1938	6 years, 10 days	
Alexander Mair	Nationalist	Minister for Labour and Industry	1 June 1938	13 October 1938	134 days	
Herbert Hawkins	Nationalist	Minister for Labour and Industry	13 October 1938	16 June 1939	246 days	
Athol Richardson	Nationalist	Minister for Labour and Industry	26 June 1939	5 August 1939	51 days	
Athol Richardson	Nationalist	Minister for Labour and Industry and Social Services	5 August 1939	16 August 1939	51 days	
George Gollan	Nationalist	Minister for Labour and Industry and Social Services	16 August 1939	16 May 1941	1 year, 273 days	
Hamilton Knight	Labor	Minister for Labour and Industry and Social Services	16 May 1941	6 February 1947	5 years, 266 days	
Hamilton Knight	Labor	Minister for Labour and Industry and Social Welfare	6 February 1947	29 October 1947	5 years, 266 days	
Jack Baddeley	Labor	Minister for Labour and Industry and Social Welfare	29 October 1947	9 March 1948	132 days	
Frank Finnan	Labor	Minister for Labour and Industry and Social Welfare	9 March 1948	30 June 1950	4 years, 351 days	
Frank Finnan	Labor	Minister for Labour and Industry	30 June 1950	23 February 1953	4 years, 351 days	
Abe Landa	Labor	Minister for Labour and Industry	23 February 1953	15 March 1956	3 years, 21 days	
Jim Maloney	Labor	Minister for Labour and Industry	15 March 1956	13 May 1965	9 years, 59 days	
Eric Willis	Liberal	Minister for Labour and Industry	13 May 1965	11 March 1971	5 years, 302 days	
Frederick Hewitt	Liberal	Minister for Labour and Industry	11 March 1971	14 May 1976	5 years, 64 days	
Paul Landa	Labor	Minister for Industrial Relations	14 May 1976	9 August 1976	87 days	
Pat Hills	Labor	Minister for Industrial Relations	9 August 1976	4 July 1986	11 years, 225 days	
Pat Hills	Labor	Minister for Industrial Relations; Minister for Employment	4 July 1986	21 March 1988	11 years, 225 days	
John Fahey	Liberal	Minister for Industrial Relations and Employment	25 March 1988	24 July 1990	4 years, 100 days	
John Fahey	Liberal	Minister for Industrial Relations; Minister for Further Education, Training and Employment	24 July 1990	3 July 1992	4 years, 100 days	
John Hannaford	Liberal	Minister for Industrial Relations	3 July 1992	26 May 1993	327 days	
Kerry Chikarovski	Liberal	Minister for Industrial Relations and Employment	26 May 1993	4 April 1995	1 year, 313 days	
Jeff Shaw	Labor	Minister for Industrial Relations	4 April 1995	28 June 2000	6 years, 85 days	
John Della Bosca	Labor	Minister for Industrial Relations	28 June 2000	13 June 2008	7 years, 351 days	
Eric Roozendaal	Labor	Minister for Industrial Relations	13 June 2008	8 September 2008	87 days	
Tony Kelly	Labor	Minister for Industrial Relations	8 September 2008	11 September 2008	2 days	
John Hatzistergos	Labor	Minister for Industrial Relations	11 September 2008	8 December 2009	1 year, 88 days	
John Robertson	Labor	Minister for Industrial Relations	8 December 2009	21 May 2010	164 days	
Paul Lynch	Labor	Minister for Industrial Relations	21 May 2010	28 March 2011	311 days	
Mike Baird	Liberal	Minister for Industrial Relations	12 September 2012	17 April 2014	1 year, 217 days	
Mike Gallacher	Liberal	Minister for Industrial Relations	23 April 2014	7 May 2014	14 days	
Andrew Constance	Liberal	Minister for Industrial Relations	7 May 2014	2 April 2015	330 days	
Gladys Berejiklian	Liberal	Minister for Industrial Relations	2 April 2015	30 January 2017	1 year, 303 days	
Dominic Perrottet	Liberal	Minister for Industrial Relations	30 January 2017	23 March 2019	2 years, 52 days	
Don Harwin	Liberal	Minister for the Public Service and Employee Relations, Aboriginal Affairs, and the Arts	2 April 2019	15 April 2020	1 year, 13 days	
Gladys Berejiklian (acting)	Liberal	Minister for the Public Service and Employee Relations, Aboriginal Affairs, and the Arts	15 April 2020	3 July 2020	79 days	
Don Harwin	Liberal	Minister for the Public Service and Employee Relations, Aboriginal Affairs, and the Arts	3 July 2020	21 December 2021	1 year, 171 days	
Damien Tudehope	Liberal	Minister for Employee Relations	21 December 2021	23 February 2023	1 year, 64 days	
Dominic Perrottet	Liberal	Minister for Employee Relations	23 February 2023	28 March 2023	33 days	
Daniel Mookhey	Labor	Minister for the Gig Economy	28 March 2023	5 April 2023	8 days	
Sophie Cotsis	Labor	Minister for Industrial Relations	5 April 2023	incumbent	3 years, 227 days	
