= Electoral results for the district of Penrith =

Election results for Penrith, New South Wales, Australia

Penrith, an electoral district of the Legislative Assembly in the Australian state of New South Wales, was created in 1973.

== Members for Penrith ==
Election	Member	Party
1973	Ron Mulock	Labor
1976	Ron Mulock	Labor
1978	Ron Mulock	Labor
1981	Peter Anderson	Labor
1984	Peter Anderson	Labor
1988	Guy Matheson	Liberal
1991	Faye Lo Po'	Labor
1995	Faye Lo Po'	Labor
1999	Faye Lo Po'	Labor
2003	Karyn Paluzzano	Labor
2007	Karyn Paluzzano	Labor
2010 by	Stuart Ayres	Liberal
2011	Stuart Ayres	Liberal
2015	Stuart Ayres	Liberal
2019	Stuart Ayres	Liberal
2023	Karen McKeown	Labor

== Election results ==
=== Elections in the 2020s ===
==== 2023 ====
2023 New South Wales state election: Penrith
Party	Candidate	Votes	%	±%
Liberal	Stuart Ayres	19,266	38.3	−1.4
Labor	Karen McKeown	19,262	38.3	+1.4
One Nation	Belinda McWilliams	4,122	8.2	+1.4
Greens	Minoo Toussi	2,643	5.2	+0.6
Legalise Cannabis	Timothy Pateman	2,467	4.9	+4.9
Animal Justice	Vanessa Blazi	1,840	3.7	+2.0
Sustainable Australia	Geoff Brown	744	1.5	−0.2
Total formal votes		50,344	96.1	+0.0
Informal votes		2,047	3.9	0.0
Turnout		52,391	87.8	−0.9
Two-party-preferred result
Labor	Karen McKeown	22,661	51.6	+2.2
Liberal	Stuart Ayres	21,226	48.4	−2.2
Labor gain from Liberal		Swing	+2.2	

=== Elections in the 2010s ===
==== 2019 ====
2019 New South Wales state election: Penrith
Party	Candidate	Votes	%	±%
Liberal	Stuart Ayres	19,561	40.04	−5.59
Labor	Karen McKeown	17,415	35.65	+2.79
One Nation	Carl Halley	3,510	7.18	+7.18
Greens	Nick Best	2,454	5.02	−0.51
Independent	Mark Tyndall	1,415	2.90	+2.90
Shooters, Fishers, Farmers	Rodney Franich	1,276	2.61	+2.61
Christian Democrats	David Burton	1,095	2.24	−1.66
Animal Justice	Kaj McBeth	885	1.81	+1.81
Independent	Marcus Cornish	665	1.36	+1.36
Sustainable Australia	Geoff Brown	577	1.18	+1.18
Total formal votes		48,853	96.41	+0.43
Informal votes		1,819	3.59	−0.43
Turnout		50,672	89.58	−1.91
Two-party-preferred result
Liberal	Stuart Ayres	21,204	51.34	−4.90
Labor	Karen McKeown	20,096	48.66	+4.90
Liberal hold		Swing	−4.90	

==== 2015 ====
2015 New South Wales state election: Penrith
Party	Candidate	Votes	%	±%
Liberal	Stuart Ayres	21,712	45.6	−8.7
Labor	Emma Husar	15,632	32.9	+7.0
Independent	Jackie Kelly	4,272	9.0	+9.0
Greens	Mark O'Sullivan	2,633	5.5	−3.7
Christian Democrats	May Spencer	1,856	3.9	−1.7
No Land Tax	Angelo Pezzano	949	2.0	+2.0
Australia First	Victor Waterson	322	0.7	+0.7
Socialist Equality	Carolyn Kennett	202	0.4	+0.4
Total formal votes		47,578	96.0	+0.2
Informal votes		1,995	4.0	−0.2
Turnout		49,573	91.5	−0.2
Two-party-preferred result
Liberal	Stuart Ayres	23,212	56.2	−9.9
Labor	Emma Husar	18,061	43.8	+9.9
Liberal hold		Swing	−9.9	

==== 2011 ====
2011 New South Wales state election: Penrith
Party	Candidate	Votes	%	±%
Liberal	Stuart Ayres	23,074	54.0	+21.4
Labor	John Thain	10,832	25.3	−23.3
Greens	Suzie Wright	4,232	9.9	+4.3
Christian Democrats	Andrew Green	2,474	5.8	−0.4
Outdoor Recreation	Joaquim De Lima	2,119	5.0	+5.0
Total formal votes		42,731	96.4	−0.9
Informal votes		1,589	3.6	+0.9
Turnout		44,320	93.9	
Two-party-preferred result
Liberal	Stuart Ayres	25,023	66.3	+25.6
Labor	John Thain	12,704	33.7	−25.6
Liberal gain from Labor		Swing	+25.6	

==== 2010 by-election ====
Penrith state by-election, 2010
Party	Candidate	Votes	%	±%
Liberal	Stuart Ayres	19,856	51.50	+18.95
Labor	John Thain	9,437	24.48	−24.19
Greens	Suzie Wright	4,679	12.14	+6.57
Christian Democrats	Andrew Green	1,692	4.39	−1.81
Independent	Noel Selby	1,047	2.72	+2.72
Independent Australia First	Mick Saunders	766	1.99	+1.99
Outdoor Recreation	David Leyonhjelm	721	1.87	+1.87
Democrats	Jose Sanz	358	0.93	+0.04
Total formal votes		38,556	96.78	−0.49
Informal votes		1,282	3.22	+0.49
Turnout		39,838	86.04	−5.14
Two-party-preferred result
Liberal	Stuart Ayres	21,831	66.48	+25.73
Labor	John Thain	11,009	33.52	−25.73
Liberal gain from Labor		Swing	+25.73	

=== Elections in the 2000s ===
==== 2007 ====
2007 New South Wales state election: Penrith
Party	Candidate	Votes	%	±%
Labor	Karyn Paluzzano	19,983	48.7	+2.3
Liberal	Tricia Hitchen	13,368	32.6	−3.0
Christian Democrats	Andrew Green	2,544	6.2	+3.4
Greens	Suzie Wright	2,285	5.6	−0.3
Independent	Geoff Brown	1,468	3.6	+3.6
AAFI	Andrew Mavin	1,052	2.6	+1.0
Democrats	Geraldine Waters	365	0.9	+0.0
Total formal votes		41,065	97.3	+0.3
Informal votes		1,151	2.7	−0.3
Turnout		42,216	93.7	
Two-party-preferred result
Labor	Karyn Paluzzano	22,020	59.2	+2.6
Liberal	Tricia Hitchen	15,146	40.8	−2.6
Labor hold		Swing	+2.6	

==== 2003 ====
2003 New South Wales state election: Penrith
Party	Candidate	Votes	%	±%
Labor	Karyn Paluzzano	18,354	45.9	−7.4
Liberal	Jim Aitken	14,368	35.9	+10.7
Greens	Lesley Edwards	2,429	6.1	+3.0
Christian Democrats	Kenneth Nathan	1,199	3.0	−0.5
One Nation	Judith Dansie	890	2.2	−6.5
Independent	Kevin Crameri	826	2.1	+2.1
Save Our Suburbs	Barbie Bates	778	1.9	+1.9
AAFI	Ian Gelling	601	1.5	+0.6
Democrats	Geraldine Waters	353	0.9	−1.4
Independent	Mitch Arvidson	158	0.4	+0.4
Unity	Li Cai	72	0.2	+0.2
Total formal votes		40,028	97.0	+0.0
Informal votes		1,238	3.0	−0.0
Turnout		41,266	92.5	
Two-party-preferred result
Labor	Karyn Paluzzano	19,951	56.1	−10.6
Liberal	Jim Aitken	15,618	43.9	+10.6
Labor hold		Swing	−10.6	

=== Elections in the 1990s ===
==== 1999 ====
1999 New South Wales state election: Penrith
Party	Candidate	Votes	%	±%
Labor	Faye Lo Po'	21,467	53.2	+5.4
Liberal	Ross Fowler	10,154	25.2	−15.5
One Nation	Jean Eykamp	3,523	8.7	+8.7
Christian Democrats	Brian Grigg	1,425	3.5	−0.2
Greens	Lesley Edwards	1,230	3.0	+3.0
Democrats	Richard Villa	933	2.3	−0.5
AAFI	David Morris	366	0.9	+0.9
Earthsave	Maureen Rogers	340	0.8	+0.8
Independent	Victoria Harris-Ball	309	0.8	+0.8
Independent	Steve Grim-Reaper	238	0.6	+0.6
Independent	Wendy Broderick	129	0.3	+0.3
Independent	Norman Hooper	114	0.3	+0.3
Non-Custodial Parents	Judith Thompson	108	0.3	+0.3
Total formal votes		40,336	97.0	+1.6
Informal votes		1,243	3.0	−1.6
Turnout		41,579	93.8	
Two-party-preferred result
Labor	Faye Lo Po'	23,235	66.7	+12.4
Liberal	Ross Fowler	11,592	33.3	−12.4
Labor hold		Swing	+12.4	

==== 1995 ====
1995 New South Wales state election: Penrith
Party	Candidate	Votes	%	±%
Labor	Faye Lo Po'	15,621	46.0	−1.6
Liberal	Jim Aitken	14,287	42.1	+1.7
Independent	Paul Quinn	1,612	4.7	+4.7
Call to Australia	Brian Grigg	1,229	3.6	+0.2
Democrats	Brooke Watson	1,197	3.5	−0.2
Total formal votes		33,946	95.9	+3.2
Informal votes		1,445	4.1	−3.2
Turnout		35,391	94.9	
Two-party-preferred result
Labor	Faye Lo Po'	17,421	52.8	−1.8
Liberal	Jim Aitken	15,578	47.2	+1.8
Labor hold		Swing	−1.8	

==== 1991 ====
1991 New South Wales state election: Penrith
Party	Candidate	Votes	%	±%
Labor	Faye Lo Po'	15,086	47.7	+4.0
Liberal	Guy Matheson	12,777	40.4	−2.0
Independent	Betty Bourke	1,543	4.9	+4.9
Democrats	Ivan Metcalfe	1,175	3.7	+3.7
Call to Australia	Brian Grigg	1,075	3.4	−2.2
Total formal votes		31,656	92.7	−3.8
Informal votes		2,492	7.3	+3.8
Turnout		34,148	94.5	
Two-party-preferred result
Labor	Faye Lo Po'	16,606	54.6	+5.9
Liberal	Guy Matheson	13,823	45.4	−5.9
Labor gain from Liberal		Swing	+5.9	

=== Elections in the 1980s ===
==== 1988 ====
1988 New South Wales state election: Penrith
Party	Candidate	Votes	%	±%
Labor	Peter Anderson	12,650	42.2	−10.7
Liberal	Guy Matheson	12,503	41.7	+5.9
Call to Australia	Brian Grigg	2,147	7.2	+7.2
Independent	Scott Duffus	2,039	6.8	+6.8
Independent	Ian Perry	610	2.0	+2.0
Total formal votes		29,949	96.8	−1.1
Informal votes		994	3.2	+1.1
Turnout		30,943	94.6	
Two-party-preferred result
Liberal	Guy Matheson	14,817	52.2	+10.3
Labor	Peter Anderson	13,571	47.8	−10.3
Liberal gain from Labor		Swing	+10.3	

==== 1984 ====
1984 New South Wales state election: Penrith
Party	Candidate	Votes	%	±%
Labor	Peter Anderson	21,794	58.8	−12.0
Liberal	Ross Shuttleworth	11,545	31.1	+1.9
Democrats	Kevin Crameri	2,576	7.0	+7.0
Independent	Ian Perry	1,150	3.1	+3.1
Total formal votes		37,065	97.4	+0.5
Informal votes		968	2.6	−0.5
Turnout		38,033	93.2	+1.0
Two-party-preferred result
Labor	Peter Anderson		64.3	−6.5
Liberal	Ross Shuttleworth		35.7	+6.5
Labor hold		Swing	−6.5	

==== 1981 ====
1981 New South Wales state election: Penrith
Party	Candidate	Votes	%	±%
Labor	Peter Anderson	22,850	70.8	−1.2
Liberal	Ross Shuttleworth	9,413	29.2	+1.2
Total formal votes		32,263	96.9	
Informal votes		1,038	3.1	
Turnout		33,301	92.2	
Labor hold		Swing	−1.2	

=== Elections in the 1970s ===
==== 1978 ====
1978 New South Wales state election: Penrith
Party	Candidate	Votes	%	±%
Labor	Ron Mulock	28,018	76.2	+16.6
Liberal	Geoffrey Saunders	8,745	23.8	−10.7
Total formal votes		36,763	97.0	−1.3
Informal votes		1,145	3.0	+1.3
Turnout		37,908	93.3	−1.3
Labor hold		Swing	+12.3	

==== 1976 ====
1976 New South Wales state election: Penrith
Party	Candidate	Votes	%	±%
Labor	Ron Mulock	19,804	59.6	+3.0
Liberal	Eileen Cammack	11,458	34.5	−3.9
Independent	Roy Allsopp	1,970	5.9	+5.9
Total formal votes		33,232	98.3	+1.2
Informal votes		590	1.7	−1.2
Turnout		33,822	94.6	+3.1
Two-party-preferred result
Labor	Ron Mulock	21,223	63.9	+4.0
Liberal	Eileen Cammack	12,009	36.1	−4.0
Labor hold		Swing	+4.0	

==== 1973 ====
1973 New South Wales state election: Penrith
Party	Candidate	Votes	%	±%
Labor	Ron Mulock	15,634	56.6	
Liberal	Eileen Cammack	10,623	38.5	
Independent	Joseph Stein	1,369	5.0	
Total formal votes		27,626	97.1	
Informal votes		813	2.9	
Turnout		28,439	91.5	
Two-party-preferred result
Labor	Ron Mulock	16,547	59.9	+0.8
Liberal	Eileen Cammack	11,079	40.1	−0.8
Labor notional hold		Swing	+0.8	

Penrith was a new seat with a notional Labor majority.
