= Electoral results for the district of Badgerys Creek =

Election results for Badgerys Creek, New South Wales, Australia

Badgerys Creek, an electoral district of the Legislative Assembly in the Australian state of New South Wales, was created in 1991 and abolished in 1999.

== Members ==
| Election | Member | Party |
|---|---|---|
| 1991 | Anne Cohen | Liberal |
| 1995 | Diane Beamer | Labor |

== Election results ==
=== 2023 ===
2023 New South Wales state election: Badgerys Creek
| Party | Candidate | Votes | % | ±% |
|---|---|---|---|---|
| Liberal | Tanya Davies | 26,972 | 51.8 | −2.3 |
| Labor | Garion Thain | 16,766 | 32.2 | −2.2 |
| One Nation | Benjamin Green | 4,268 | 8.2 | +5.8 |
| Greens | Nick Best | 2,751 | 5.3 | +0.4 |
| Sustainable Australia | Peter Cooper | 1,321 | 2.5 | −0.6 |
| Total formal votes | | 52,078 | 96.2 | +0.2 |
| Informal votes | | 2,072 | 3.8 | −0.2 |
| Turnout | | 54,150 | 89.9 | +1.3 |
Two-party-preferred result
| Liberal | Tanya Davies | 28,868 | 60.5 | +0.7 |
| Labor | Garion Thain | 18,866 | 39.5 | −0.7 |
| Liberal hold | | Swing | +0.7 | |

=== 1995 ===
1995 New South Wales state election: Badgerys Creek
| Party | Candidate | Votes | % | ±% |
|---|---|---|---|---|
| Labor | Diane Beamer | 18,035 | 46.0 | +3.2 |
| Liberal | Anne Cohen | 17,923 | 45.8 | −3.1 |
| Independent | John Thomson | 1,365 | 3.5 | +3.5 |
| Citizen Opinion Law Order | Tony Caughey | 1,012 | 2.6 | +2.6 |
| Call to Australia | Jonathan Grigg | 840 | 2.1 | +2.1 |
| Total formal votes | | 39,175 | 95.1 | +6.9 |
| Informal votes | | 2,023 | 4.9 | −6.9 |
| Turnout | | 41,198 | 94.6 | |
Two-party-preferred result
| Labor | Diane Beamer | 19,150 | 50.1 | +2.6 |
| Liberal | Anne Cohen | 19,043 | 49.9 | −2.6 |
| Labor gain from Liberal | | Swing | +2.6 | |

=== 1991 ===
1991 New South Wales state election: Badgerys Creek
| Party | Candidate | Votes | % | ±% |
|---|---|---|---|---|
| Liberal | Anne Cohen | 14,844 | 48.9 | +5.2 |
| Labor | Diane Beamer | 12,975 | 42.8 | +2.6 |
| Independent | Ray Allan | 1,471 | 4.9 | +4.8 |
| Independent EFF | David Bryant | 1,040 | 3.4 | −10.0 |
| Total formal votes | | 30,330 | 88.2 | −8.0 |
| Informal votes | | 4,045 | 11.8 | +8.0 |
| Turnout | | 34,375 | 94.2 | |
Two-party-preferred result
| Liberal | Anne Cohen | 15,555 | 52.5 | −0.6 |
| Labor | Diane Beamer | 14,091 | 47.5 | +0.6 |
| Liberal notional hold | | Swing | −0.6 | |

Badgerys Creek was a new seat with a notional Liberal majority.
