= Electoral results for the district of Baulkham Hills =

Election results for Bankstown, New South Wales, Australia

Baulkham Hills, an electoral district of the Legislative Assembly in the Australian state of New South Wales, was established in 1991.

Election	Member	Party
1991	Wayne Merton	Liberal
1995	Wayne Merton	Liberal
1999	Wayne Merton	Liberal
2003	Wayne Merton	Liberal
2007	Wayne Merton	Liberal
2011	David Elliott	Liberal
2015	David Elliott	Liberal
2019	David Elliott	Liberal

== Election results ==
=== Elections in the 2010s ===
==== 2019 ====
2019 New South Wales state election: Baulkham Hills
Party	Candidate	Votes	%	±%
Liberal	David Elliott	30,040	59.71	−4.82
Labor	Ryan Tracey	11,600	23.06	+0.89
Greens	Erica Hockley	3,937	7.83	−0.08
Christian Democrats	Craig Hall	1,868	3.71	+0.29
Animal Justice	Linda Newfield	1,485	2.95	+2.95
Sustainable Australia	Heather Boyd	1,380	2.74	+2.74
Total formal votes		50,310	97.48	+0.22
Informal votes		1,302	2.52	−0.22
Turnout		51,612	92.89	−0.92
Two-party-preferred result
Liberal	David Elliott	31,658	68.68	−3.11
Labor	Ryan Tracey	14,434	31.32	+3.11
Liberal hold		Swing	−3.11	

==== 2015 ====
2015 New South Wales state election: Baulkham Hills
Party	Candidate	Votes	%	±%
Liberal	David Elliott	31,793	64.5	−3.1
Labor	Ryan Tracey	10,920	22.2	+5.9
Greens	Alice Suttie	3,894	7.9	−2.0
Christian Democrats	Kaia Thorpe	1,686	3.4	−0.9
No Land Tax	Neil Holden	973	2.0	+2.0
Total formal votes		49,266	97.3	+0.4
Informal votes		1,390	2.7	−0.4
Turnout		50,656	93.8	−4.6
Two-party-preferred result
Liberal	David Elliott	33,021	71.8	−6.6
Labor	Ryan Tracey	12,975	28.2	+6.6
Liberal hold		Swing	−6.6	

==== 2011 ====
2011 New South Wales state election: Baulkham Hills
Party	Candidate	Votes	%	±%
Liberal	David Elliott	31,000	66.0	+14.4
Labor	Tony Hay	8,337	17.7	−13.3
Greens	Mick Hollins	5,360	11.4	+3.9
Christian Democrats	Kaia Thorpe	2,280	4.9	+0.0
Total formal votes		46,977	97.2	−0.3
Informal votes		1,330	2.8	+0.3
Turnout		48,307	94.8	+0.5
Two-party-preferred result
Liberal	David Elliott	32,963	76.4	+15.9
Labor	Tony Hay	10,161	23.6	−15.9
Liberal hold		Swing	+15.9	

=== Elections in the 2000s ===
==== 2007 ====
2007 New South Wales state election: Baulkham Hills
Party	Candidate	Votes	%	±%
Liberal	Wayne Merton	23,153	51.5	+5.9
Labor	Tony Hay	13,940	31.0	−5.3
Greens	Mark Rodowicz	3,359	7.5	+0.7
Christian Democrats	Godwin Goh	2,173	4.8	+0.4
Unity	Yan Li	1,251	2.8	+0.7
Against Further Immigration	Gregory Piol	1,046	2.3	+0.0
Total formal votes		44,922	97.5	−0.1
Informal votes		1,147	2.5	+0.1
Turnout		46,069	94.3	
Two-party-preferred result
Liberal	Wayne Merton	24,870	60.5	+6.5
Labor	Tony Hay	16,211	39.5	−6.5
Liberal hold		Swing	+6.5	

==== 2003 ====
2003 New South Wales state election: Baulkham Hills
Party	Candidate	Votes	%	±%
Liberal	Wayne Merton	19,652	47.0	−0.9
Labor	Tony Hay	14,327	34.3	+2.2
Greens	Gabi Martinez	2,880	6.9	+3.7
Christian Democrats	Tania Piper	1,825	4.4	+4.4
Unity	Anne Bi	1,127	2.7	−0.5
Democrats	Margaret van de Weg	1,083	2.6	−4.3
Against Further Immigration	George Bilson	889	2.1	+0.2
Total formal votes		41,783	97.8	+0.2
Informal votes		944	2.2	−0.2
Turnout		42,727	93.7	
Two-party-preferred result
Liberal	Wayne Merton	21,150	55.9	−2.3
Labor	Tony Hay	16,705	44.1	+2.3
Liberal hold		Swing	−2.3	

=== Elections in the 1990s ===
==== 1999 ====
1999 New South Wales state election: Baulkham Hills
Party	Candidate	Votes	%	±%
Liberal	Wayne Merton	19,737	47.9	−11.6
Labor	Tony Hay	13,206	32.1	+4.3
Democrats	Margaret Ferrara	2,861	6.9	+6.2
One Nation	Lothar Schultejohann	1,825	4.4	+4.4
Unity	Matthew Wong	1,336	3.2	+3.2
Greens	Chris Harris	1,315	3.2	+3.2
Against Further Immigration	Margaret King	794	1.9	−6.4
Non-Custodial Parents	David Marshall	106	0.3	+0.3
Total formal votes		41,180	97.6	+1.6
Informal votes		1,016	2.4	−1.6
Turnout		42,196	94.7	
Two-party-preferred result
Liberal	Wayne Merton	21,440	58.1	−9.8
Labor	Tony Hay	15,439	41.9	+9.8
Liberal hold		Swing	−9.8	

==== 1995 ====
1995 New South Wales state election: Baulkham Hills
Party	Candidate	Votes	%	±%
Liberal	Wayne Merton	20,644	58.9	−6.4
Labor	Tony Hay	9,946	28.4	+2.2
Against Further Immigration	Dale Elder	3,037	8.7	+8.7
Call to Australia	Tony Kassas	1,438	4.1	+4.1
Total formal votes		35,065	95.9	+5.2
Informal votes		1,517	4.1	−5.2
Turnout		36,582	95.6	
Two-party-preferred result
Liberal	Wayne Merton	22,605	67.5	−2.3
Labor	Tony Hay	10,895	32.5	+2.3
Liberal hold		Swing	−2.3	

==== 1991 ====
1991 New South Wales state election: Baulkham Hills
Party	Candidate	Votes	%	±%
Liberal	Wayne Merton	20,500	65.2	−5.3
Labor	Bill Pinkstone	8,232	26.2	−3.3
Democrats	Brian Shoebridge	2,690	8.6	+8.6
Total formal votes		31,422	90.7	−6.0
Informal votes		3,240	9.3	+6.0
Turnout		34,662	95.9	
Two-party-preferred result
Liberal	Wayne Merton	21,308	69.7	−0.8
Labor	Bill Pinkstone	9,245	30.3	+0.8
Liberal notional hold		Swing	−0.8	

Baulkham Hills was a new seat with a notional Liberal majority.
