= Electoral results for the district of Mulgoa =

Election results for Mulgoa, New South Wales, Australia

Mulgoa, an electoral district of the Legislative Assembly in the Australian state of New South Wales, has had two incarnations, the first from 1988 to 1991, the second from 1999.

== Members ==
First incarnation (1988–1991)
Election	Member	Party
1988	Tony Aquilina	Labor
Second incarnation (1999–present)
Election	Member	Party
1999	Diane Beamer	Labor
2003	Diane Beamer	Labor
2007	Diane Beamer	Labor
2011	Tanya Davies	Liberal
2015	Tanya Davies	Liberal
2019	Tanya Davies	Liberal

== Election results ==
=== Elections in the 2010s ===
==== 2019 ====
2019 New South Wales state election: Mulgoa
Party	Candidate	Votes	%	±%
Liberal	Tanya Davies	29,379	57.19	+3.91
Labor	Todd Carney	17,270	33.62	−1.42
Greens	Rob Shield	2,897	5.64	+1.44
Sustainable Australia	Jessie Bijok	1,829	3.56	+3.56
Total formal votes		51,375	95.87	+0.10
Informal votes		2,213	4.13	−0.10
Turnout		53,588	91.98	−1.08
Two-party-preferred result
Liberal	Tanya Davies	29,910	61.33	+1.67
Labor	Todd Carney	18,858	38.67	−1.67
Liberal hold		Swing	+1.67	

==== 2015 ====
2015 New South Wales state election: Mulgoa
Party	Candidate	Votes	%	±%
Liberal	Tanya Davies	25,709	53.3	−0.2
Labor	Todd Carney	16,909	35.0	+3.6
Christian Democrats	Jennifer Scholfield	2,193	4.5	−0.2
Greens	Kingsley Liu	2,024	4.2	−1.6
No Land Tax	Tania Canto	1,425	3.0	+3.0
Total formal votes		48,260	95.8	+0.7
Informal votes		2,132	4.2	−0.7
Turnout		50,392	93.1	+1.6
Two-party-preferred result
Liberal	Tanya Davies	26,786	59.7	−2.7
Labor	Todd Carney	18,114	40.3	+2.7
Liberal hold		Swing	−2.7	

==== 2011 ====
2011 New South Wales state election: Mulgoa
Party	Candidate	Votes	%	±%
Liberal	Tanya Davies	23,822	53.2	+17.9
Labor	Prue Guillaume	14,270	31.9	−23.1
Greens	Patrick Darley-Jones	2,554	5.7	+0.8
Independent Australia First	Tony Robinson	1,861	4.2	+4.2
Christian Democrats	Luke Portelli	1,681	3.8	+3.8
Democratic Labor	Emily Dunn	609	1.4	+1.4
Total formal votes		44,797	95.9	−0.5
Informal votes		1,898	4.1	+0.5
Turnout		46,695	94.6	
Two-party-preferred result
Liberal	Tanya Davies	25,223	62.0	+23.2
Labor	Prue Guillaume	15,437	38.0	−23.2
Liberal gain from Labor		Swing	+23.2	

=== Elections in the 2000s ===
==== 2007 ====
2007 New South Wales state election: Mulgoa
Party	Candidate	Votes	%	±%
Labor	Diane Beamer	23,097	55.0	−3.1
Liberal	Karen Chijoff	14,835	35.3	+6.7
Greens	Wade Smith	2,065	4.9	+0.8
Against Further Immigration	Geoffrey Dakin	2,019	4.8	+2.4
Total formal votes		42,016	96.4	+0.2
Informal votes		1,575	3.6	−0.2
Turnout		43,591	94.2	
Two-party-preferred result
Labor	Diane Beamer	24,261	61.1	−5.5
Liberal	Karen Chijoff	15,432	38.9	+5.5
Labor hold		Swing	−5.5	

==== 2003 ====
2003 New South Wales state election: Mulgoa
Party	Candidate	Votes	%	±%
Labor	Diane Beamer	25,941	59.5	+6.4
Liberal	Christine Bourne	12,006	27.5	+3.3
Greens	William Gayed	1,754	4.0	+2.0
Save Our Suburbs	Jean Lopez	1,474	3.4	+3.4
Against Further Immigration	Dennis Fordyce	1,061	2.4	+1.4
One Nation	Michael Church	876	2.0	−6.9
Democrats	Lorraine Dodd	497	1.1	−2.1
Total formal votes		43,609	96.1	−0.2
Informal votes		1,757	3.9	+0.2
Turnout		45,366	93.3	
Two-party-preferred result
Labor	Diane Beamer	26,953	67.9	+0.3
Liberal	Christine Bourne	12,742	32.1	−0.3
Labor hold		Swing	+0.3	

=== Elections in the 1990s ===
==== 1999 ====
1999 New South Wales state election: Mulgoa
Party	Candidate	Votes	%	±%
Labor	Diane Beamer	21,413	53.1	−1.2
Liberal	Christine Bourne	9,772	24.2	−13.5
One Nation	Rick Putra	3,569	8.9	+8.9
Democrats	Andrew Owen	1,282	3.2	+0.7
No Badgerys Creek Airport	Al Mewett	1,196	3.0	+3.0
Greens	Peter Grant	791	2.0	+2.0
Gun Owners and Sporting Hunters Rights	Val Horton	711	1.8	+1.8
Republic 2001	Simon Hedges	450	1.1	+1.1
Against Further Immigration	James Carey	407	1.0	+1.0
Outdoor Recreation	Leah Mathews	403	1.0	+1.0
People First	Brent Lawson	188	0.5	+0.5
Non-Custodial Parents	Ian Owens	121	0.3	+0.3
Total formal votes		40,303	96.3	+1.8
Informal votes		1,555	3.7	−1.8
Turnout		41,858	93.6	
Two-party-preferred result
Labor	Diane Beamer	22,993	67.6	+8.9
Liberal	Christine Bourne	11,029	32.4	−8.9
Labor notional hold		Swing	+8.9	

=== Elections in the 1980s ===
==== 1988 ====
1988 New South Wales state election: Mulgoa
Party	Candidate	Votes	%	±%
Labor	Tony Aquilina	14,689	52.0	−11.8
Liberal	Douglas Hayne	11,573	40.9	+12.7
Independent	David Collier	2,009	7.1	+7.1
Total formal votes		28,271	95.4	−1.9
Informal votes		1,348	4.6	+1.9
Turnout		29,619	94.0	
Two-party-preferred result
Labor	Tony Aquilina	15,254	55.5	−12.6
Liberal	Douglas Hayne	12,235	44.5	+12.6
Labor notional hold		Swing	−12.6	
