= Minchinbury =

Minchinbury may refer to:

- Minchinbury, New South Wales, a suburb of Sydney
- Minchinbury (wine), a popular brand of sparkling wine in Australia, formerly known as Minchinbury Champagne. The brand is now owned by Treasury Wine Estates. It was originally grown and made where the suburb now stands.
- Electoral district of Minchinbury, a former electorate for the parliament of New South Wales
- Minchinbury Sandstone, a type of sedimentary rock
