= 1991 New South Wales state election =

State election for New South Wales, Australia in March 1991

- 25 May 1991

All 99 seats in the New South Wales Legislative Assembly and 15 (of the 44) seats in the New South Wales Legislative Council 50 Assembly seats were needed for a majority
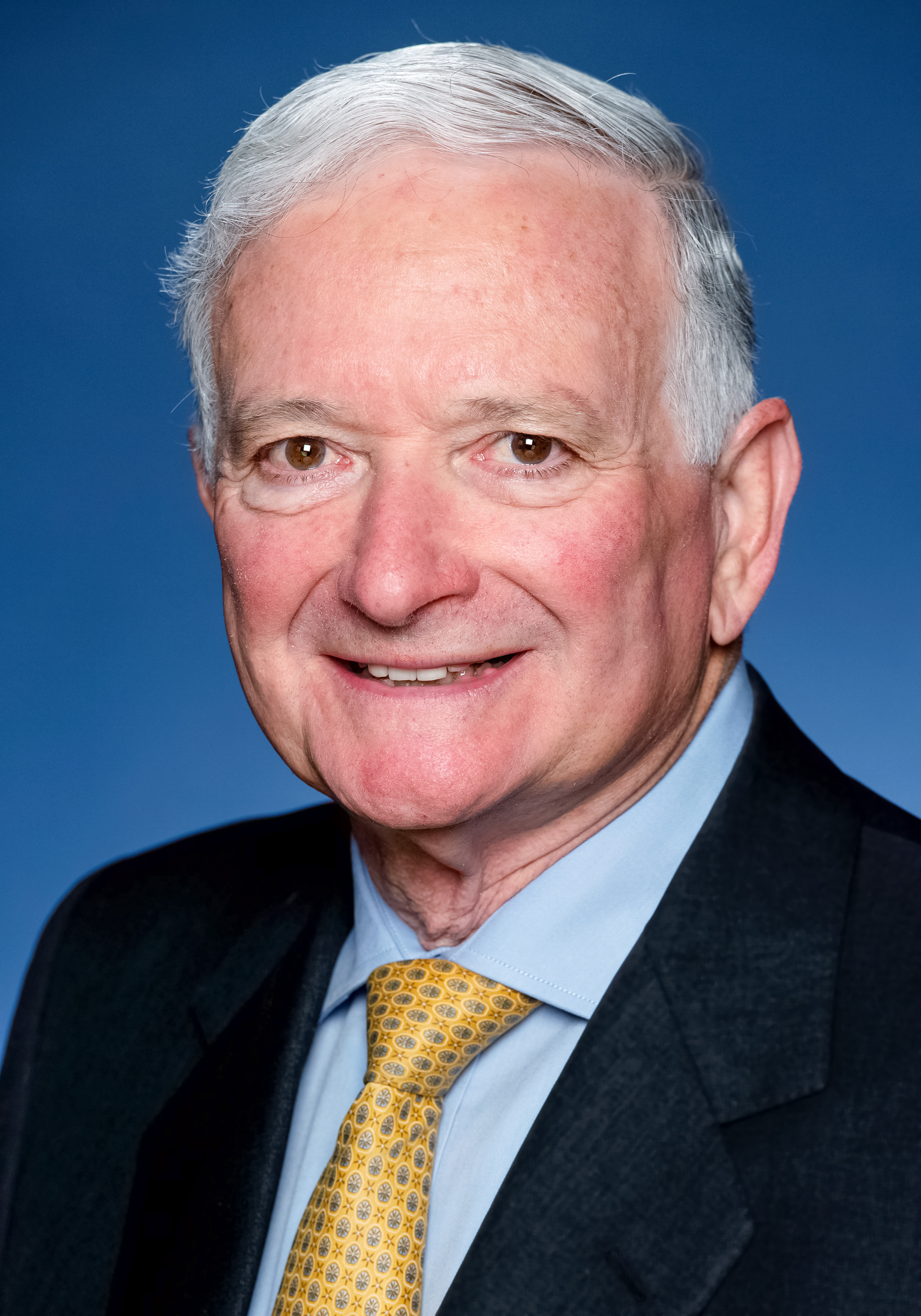

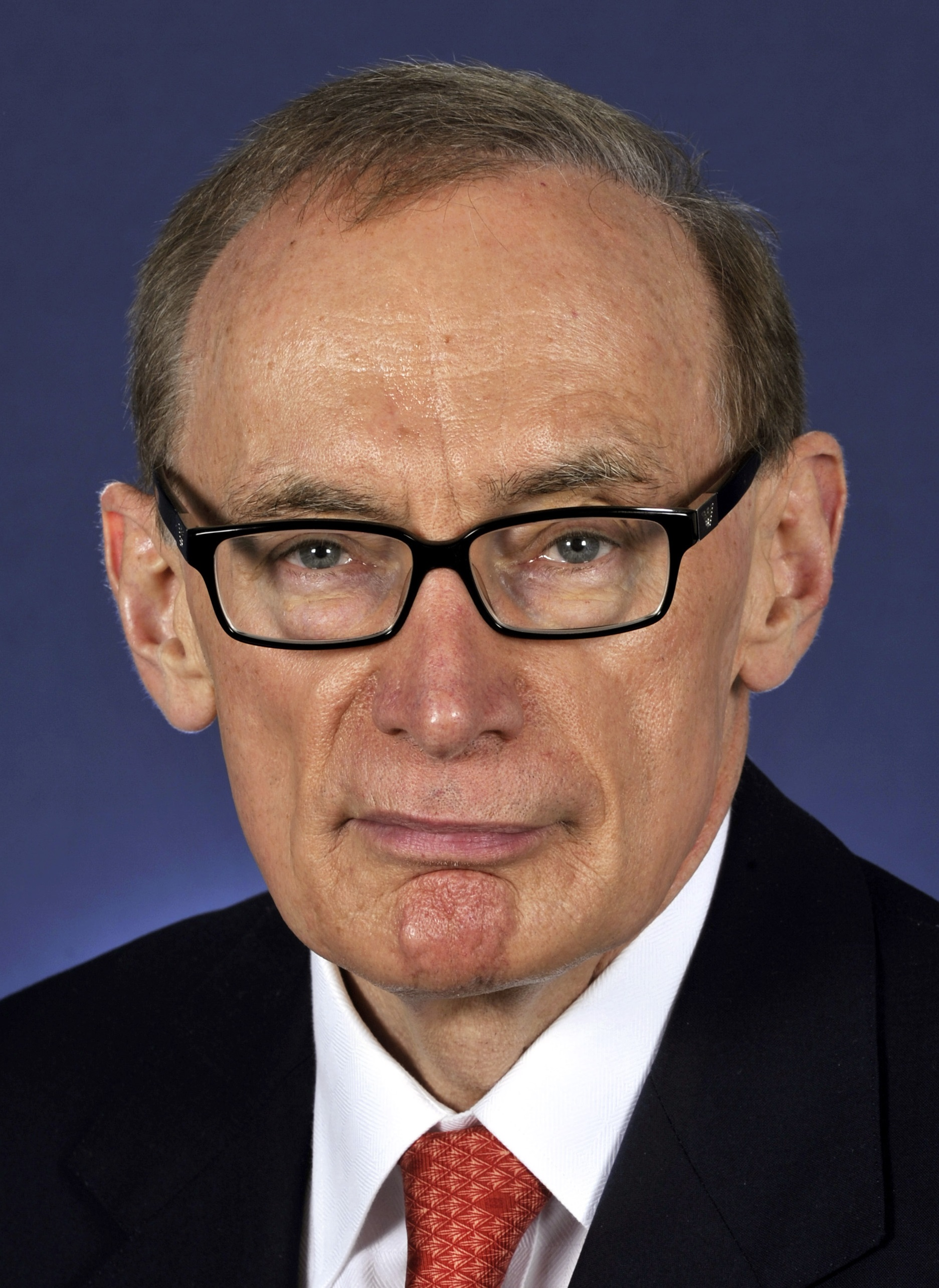
	First party	Second party
Leader	Nick Greiner	Bob Carr
Party	Liberal/National coalition	Labor
Leader since	15 March 1983	6 April 1988
Leader's seat	Ku-ring-gai	Maroubra
Last election	59 seats	43 seats
Seats won	49	46
Seat change	▼10	▲3
Popular vote	1,377,314	1,204,066
Percentage	44.68%	39.05%
Swing	▼4.87	▲0.56
TPP	52.69%	47.31%
TPP swing	▼3.27	▲3.27
- Two-candidate-preferred margin by electorate
Premier before election
Nick Greiner
Liberal/National coalition
Resulting Premier
Nick Greiner
Liberal/National coalition

Elections to the 50th Parliament of New South Wales were held on Saturday 25 May 1991. All seats in the Legislative Assembly and half the seats in the Legislative Council were up for election. The Liberal–National Coalition government of Premier Nick Greiner, which enjoyed a considerable majority following their landslide win at the 1988 election, was seeking a second term in office against new Labor Opposition Leader Bob Carr.

The government had reduced the number of lower house seats from 109 to 99 for the 1991 election, reversing an increase approved by the Unsworth Labor government.

== Background ==
=== Greiner Government ===
The 1988 election generated a two-party preferred swing to the Coalition of 8.4% and saw the Labor Party record its lowest primary vote in half a century. This was a clear rejection of the Unsworth Government, although it was less clear whether the electorate was endorsing the full range of Coalition policies. Qualms about the meaning of its mandate were clearly of little concern to the new government, under Nick Greiner which immediately began introducing wide-ranging reforms to the New South Wales public sector.

The finance and administration of all government trading enterprises was put on a more commercial basis, with standard rates of return on capital set and separate community service obligations for specific public funding identified. There were major expenditure cuts and dramatic price increases in education, public transport and electricity. The new government spoke of New South Wales living beyond its means; introducing new user-pay charges, proposed the sale of underused public assets to help pay off state debt, and flagged the use of private capital to build public infrastructure. It was a radical agenda at the time, but it was package of reforms that would become the standard across Australia over the next decade.

The government implemented “truth in sentencing” laws which required judges to set minimum terms for convicted criminals and abolished time off for good behaviour in jail. Responding to the corruption allegations that had regularly swirled around New South Wales politics, the government also created a standing royal commission, the Independent Commission Against Corruption (ICAC), as an independent body to investigate allegations of corruption and maladministration.

The government attracted most controversy over changes on the educational sector, adding the confrontational style of Education Minister Terry Metherell. There were major cutbacks in teaching and ancillary staff, closures of schools and an increase in class sizes and the number of composite classes. The government unzoned state schools, and have allowed parents to enroll their children outside of the local district. This situation allowed the creation of new selective and specialist high schools.

=== Labor Opposition ===
The Labor Opposition initially struggled in the face of the government's rapidly moving agenda. Ten ministers had either retired or been defeated at the 1988 election. The former Environment and Planning Minister, Bob Carr had reluctantly accepted the party leadership. The Opposition had some encouraging results at by-elections as the government's new taxes and charges began to bite.

Labor made important gains at the March 1990 federal election, but the electoral position had been reversed by the end of the year.

=== Economic conditions ===
The economic recession of the early-1990s hit the State's finances, but New South Wales was substantially better off than interstate Labor administrations that had accumulated debt and gambled on failed commercial ventures.

The hard medicine introduced by the Greiner Government was unpopular, but it was becoming apparent that New South Wales was in a better position as a result of the financial changes. The surprise resignation of Metherell over tax charges in July 1990 provided a boost for the government by removing its most controversial Minister.

Opinion polls showed the government trailing by seven points in March 1990, but 15 points ahead in December. The government was now well placed for an early election and keen to avoid the opprobrium of another tough budget.

== Redistribution ==
The opportunity came with the finalisation of a redistribution in March 1991. The Coalition had promised to cut the size of the Legislative Assembly from 109 to 99 seats, reversing the previous government's increase and automatically triggering a redistribution.

== Campaign ==
The government campaigned on its record, arguing good financial management had prevented New South Wales suffering the sort of financial collapse caused by interstate Labor Governments.

The Labor Party campaigned on those same government reforms, but concentrated on how the government's new taxes and charges had hurt lower to middle income families, combined with the government's sale of state assets and institutions, reduction in services for health, public housing maintenance, transport (particularly rail), tolls on the M4 motorway, and RTA road $2 million funding for Western Sydney Council's being wiped out and used in the Deputy Premier Wal Murray's Western NSW seat of Barwon following the Nyngan floods of 1990. The Nyngan floods additionally damaged the passenger rail line, with the flood damaged rail line never repaired or services reopened. The tendering out to a South African listed company transport and delivery of documents in contravention of the international boycott of business dealings with South African private, listed and government organisations was also an issue.

Disparity in government responses to natural disasters was highlighted by the lack of natural disaster declarations in March 1990. On 18 March 1990, a savage hailstorm devastated regions of areas from southwest Sydney to near Dee Why. Hailstones the size of cricket balls and in some case larger pummeled vehicles and punctured holes in house roofs across many suburbs particularly Liverpool, Bankstown, Bass Hill, Auburn and Lidcombe. Hail sizes reported from this storm were up to 8 cm in diameter. One reliable report from Liverpool used two hands to indicate the sizes of the hail that fell at his residence. The Government failed to make a disaster declaration, however.

Adding insult to injury, the electorates with government members were assisted as a priority with many employees of those whose homes had been damaged in the South West of Sydney being directed to the government members' areas first. The 1990 disaster was until recently one of Australia's most costly natural disasters with a cost in 1990 of AUD$319 million (2011 normalised cost of AUD$1.3 billion). Some homes for over 10 years in the Southwest of Sydney damaged by this weather event had temporary "Tarps" on roofs. Local government infrastructure in the areas damaged by the hailstorm event also had to repair local facilities with existing funds to repair them with the absence of a natural disaster declaration. Local halls, swimming facilities, sporting and recreational areas were repaired without disaster relief funding from the state government, leaving the cost of repairs to local governments.

== Key dates ==
Date	Event
3 May 1991	The Legislative Assembly was dissolved, and writs were issued by the Governor to proceed with an election.
8 May 1991	Nominations for candidates for the election closed at noon.
25 May 1991	Polling day, between the hours of 8am and 6pm.
6 June 1991	The Greiner-Murray Ministry was reconstituted.
28 June 1991	The writ was returned and the results formally declared.
2 July 1991	Parliament resumed for business.

== Results ==
The result was a stalemate. Total formal voting for the state was 3,083,260 voters with 3,205,524 formal votes in 1988.

=== Legislative Assembly ===
Party	Votes	%	+/–	Seats	+/–
Labor	1,204,066	39.05	▲0.57	46	▲3
Liberal	1,053,100	34.16	▼1.64	32	▼7
National	324,214	10.52	▼3.22	17	▼3
Independents	256,223	8.31	▲0.14	4	▼3
Democrats	165,229	5.36	▲3.55	0	Steady
Call to Australia	36,807	1.19	▲0.75	0	Steady
Country Residents	16,557	0.54	▲0.54	0	Steady
Greens	16,556	0.54	New	0	New
Citizens Electoral Council	5,198	0.17	New	0	New
Others	5,310	0.17	▼1.39	0	Steady
Total	3,083,260	100.00	–	99	–
Valid votes	3,083,260	90.68			
Invalid/blank votes	316,832	9.32	▲6.04		
Total votes	3,400,092	100.00	–		
Registered voters/turnout	3,631,618	93.62	▲0.04		
Source: NSW Parliament
Two-party-preferred
Liberal/National Coalition	1,539,949	52.75	▼3.27		
Labor	1,379,267	47.25	▲3.27		
Total	2,919,216	100.00	–		

Popular vote
Labor	39.05%
Liberal	34.16%
National	10.52%
Democrats	5.36%
Call to Australia	1.19%
Independents	8.31%
Others	1.42%
Two-party-preferred vote
Coalition	52.69%
Labor	47.31%
Parliamentary seats
Labor	49
Liberal	32
National	17
Independents	4

=== Legislative Council ===
Party	Votes	%	+/–	Seats			
Party	Votes	%	+/–	Seats Won	Not Up	Total Seats	Seat Change
Liberal/National Coalition	1,453,441	46.02	▼0.81	7	13	20	▲1
Labor	1,195,324	37.85	▼0.22	6	12	18	▼3
Democrats	167,245	5.30	▲3.97	1	1	2	Steady
Call to Australia	114,648	3.63	▼2.16	1	1	2	▼1
Greens	106,325	3.37	New	0	0	0	New
EFF/Grey Power/CEC	49,077	1.55	▼0.87	0	0	0	Steady
Country Residents Party	21,628	0.68	New	0	0	0	New
No Toxic Incinerator Group	18,706	0.59	New	0	0	0	New
Marie Bignold Team	14,403	0.46	New	0	0	0	New
Others	17,598	0.56		0	0	0	Steady
Total	3,158,395	100.00	–	15	27	42	–
Valid votes	3,158,395	94.25					
Invalid/blank votes	192,718	5.75	▼2.64				
Total votes	3,351,113	100.00	–				
Registered voters/turnout	3,631,618	92.28	▲1.66				
Source: NSW Parliament

The 9.32% informal vote at the 1991 election was the highest on record. Labor-held seats in particular had high informal votes, with 23.48% in Bankstown, 17.80% in Cabramatta, 15.29% in Canterbury, 19.13% in Fairfield, 16.03% in Heffron, 15.82% in Lakemba, 22.24% in Londonderry, 16.07% in Smithfield and 8.26% in The Entrance. Informal votes was higher than all candidates except the winner of the seat. ABC election analyst Antony Green's election analysis stated it "may well be the highest ever recorded at a democratic election in the world".

The Liberal Party won The Entrance by only 116 votes. The Labor Party launched a challenge to the result in the Court of Disputed Returns, based on the significant number of voters in the electorate who had incorrectly been issued absent votes for the neighbouring electorate of Gosford. The Court upheld the appeal and ordered a by-election, which Labor won. At the by-election, the informal vote was only 1.57%.

The referendum for changes to the upper house was approved by 58% of voters.

The Coalition recorded 52.7% of the two-party preferred vote, but most of its vote was wasted on landslide margins in its heartland. Labor rebounded strongly under Carr, recovering much of the ground it had lost in its severe defeat three years earlier. As a result, the Coalition suffered a 10-seat swing, winning only 49 of the 99 seats, one seat short of a majority. The Coalition also lost control of the Legislative Council at the election.

Labor defeated the four Independents elected in formerly safe Labor seats in 1988 and, in addition, re-gained Broken Hill, Drummoyne and Port Stephens, seats that on the new boundaries were notionally Coalition held. Former Labor MPs were returned to Parliament in both Cessnock and Bathurst, while the issue of user-pay charges played an important part in Labor gaining both Parramatta and Penrith.

Coming so close to victory was a shock for the Labor Party, having entered the 1991 election merely hoping to hold what it had, and regain traditional Labor seats lost to Independents in 1988. The Coalition was overconfident that perceptions of good economic management would see it re-elected. It ran a presidential campaign that won the overall vote but resulted in the loss of key seats. The Coalition's best results were in safe Liberal Party seats on Sydney's North Shore, while Labor won the battle in marginal seats.

== Seats changing hands ==
Seat	Pre-1991			Swing	Post-1991		
Seat	Party	Member	Margin	Swing	Margin	Member	Party
Bathurst	Liberal	David Berry	5.2	-10.3	5.1	Mick Clough	Labor
Cessnock	Liberal	Bob Roberts	0.4	-4.8	4.4	Stan Neilly	Labor
Manly	Liberal	David Hay	14.9	-15.6	0.7	Peter Macdonald	Independent
Newcastle	Independent	George Keegan	3.1	-15.5	12.4	Bryce Gaudry	Labor
Penrith	Liberal	Guy Matheson	1.2	-5.8	4.6	Faye Lo Po'	Labor
Swansea	Independent	Ivan Welsh	8.1	-14.0	6.4	Don Bowman	Labor
Tamworth	National	Noel Park	25.1	-34.9	9.8	Tony Windsor	Independent
Wollongong	Independent	Frank Arkell	4.7	-13.3	8.6	Gerry Sullivan	Labor

=== Redistribution affected seats ===
Seat	1988 election			1990 redistribution			Swing	1991 election		
Seat	Party	Member	Margin	Party	Member	Margin	Swing	Margin	Member	Party
Bligh	Independent	Clover Moore	0.6	Liberal	Notional	4.1	-10.2	6.1	Clover Moore	Independent
Broken Hill	Labor	Bill Beckroge	2.0	National	Notional	2.0	-12.1	10.1	Bill Beckroge	Labor
Drummoyne	Labor	John Murray	2.1	Liberal	Notional	0.9	-4.5	3.6	John Murray	Labor
North Shore	Independent	Robyn Read	2.1§	Liberal	Notional	1.6	+0.9	2.5	Phillip Smiles	Liberal
Parramatta	Liberal	John Books	0.5	Labor	Notional	0.3	+2.3	2.6	Andrew Ziolkowski	Labor
Port Stephens	Labor	Bob Martin	0.2	Liberal	Notional	2.9	-13.0	10.1	Bob Martin	Labor

§ Margin estimated on Independent member Ted Mack's results against Liberal at the 1988 election.

== Post-election pendulum ==
Government seats (53)
Marginal
The Entrance	Bob Graham	LIB	0.2%
Maitland	Peter Blackmore	LIB	0.6%
Manly	Peter Macdonald	IND	0.7% v LIB
Camden	Liz Kernohan	LIB	1.5%
North Shore	Phillip Smiles	LIB	2.5% v IND
Badgerys Creek	Anne Cohen	LIB	2.5%
Blue Mountains	Barry Morris	LIB	2.6%
Gladesville	Ivan Petch	LIB	2.9%
Sutherland	Chris Downy	LIB	3.0%
Murwillumbah	Don Beck	NAT	3.1%
Orange	Garry West	NAT	5.3% v IND
Fairly safe
Bligh	Clover Moore	IND	6.1% v LIB
Southern Highlands	John Fahey	LIB	6.4%
Gosford	Chris Hartcher	LIB	6.7%
Coffs Harbour	Andrew Fraser	NAT	7.0%
Burrinjuck	Alby Schultz	LIB	8.8%
Strathfield	Paul Zammit	LIB	9.3%
Ermington	Michael Photios	LIB	9.7%
Tamworth	Tony Windsor	IND	9.8% v NAT
Safe
Miranda	Ron Phillips	LIB	10.3%
Clarence	Ian Causley	NAT	10.6%
Cronulla	Malcolm Kerr	LIB	11.3%
Georges River	Terry Griffiths	LIB	11.4%
Oxley	Bruce Jeffery	NAT	11.5%
Northern Tablelands	Ray Chappell	NAT	11.5%
Murrumbidgee	Adrian Cruickshank	NAT	11.8%
Willoughby	Peter Collins	LIB	11.9% v IND
Lismore	Bill Rixon	NAT	12.2%
Wakehurst	Brad Hazzard	LIB	12.7%
Monaro	Peter Cochran	NAT	12.7%
Bega	Russell Smith	LIB	12.8%
Vaucluse	Michael Yabsley	LIB	13.0%
Ballina	Don Page	NAT	13.3%
Upper Hunter	George Souris	NAT	14.7%
Barwon	Wal Murray	NAT	15.1%
Albury	Ian Glachan	LIB	15.3%
Wagga Wagga	Joe Schipp	LIB	15.8%
Lachlan	Ian Armstrong	NAT	16.2%
Dubbo	Gerry Peacocke	NAT	16.9%
The Hills	Tony Packard	LIB	17.4% v IND
Port Macquarie	Wendy Machin	NAT	17.7%
South Coast	John Hatton	IND	18.3% v LIB
Myall Lakes	John Turner	NAT	18.6%
Eastwood	Andrew Tink	LIB	18.7%
Baulkham Hills	Wayne Merton	LIB	19.7%
Ku-ring-gai	Nick Greiner	LIB	22.7%
Davidson	Terry Metherell	LIB	22.7%
Hawkesbury	Kevin Rozzoli	LIB	22.8%
Pittwater	Jim Longley	LIB	23.4%
Lane Cove	Kerry Chikarovski	LIB	23.7%
Northcott	Bruce Baird	LIB	26.4%
Murray	Jim Small	NAT	31.4%
Gordon	Tim Moore	LIB	33.5%

Opposition seats (46)
Marginal
Coogee	Ernie Page	ALP	1.6%
Parramatta	Andrew Ziolkowski	ALP	2.6%
Kogarah	Brian Langton	ALP	3.3%
Drummoyne	John Murray	ALP	3.6%
Cessnock	Stan Neilly	ALP	4.4%
Moorebank	Craig Knowles	ALP	4.4%
Hurstville	Morris Iemma	ALP	4.6%
Penrith	Faye Lo Po'	ALP	4.6%
Bathurst	Mick Clough	ALP	5.1%
Fairly safe
Swansea	Don Bowman	ALP	6.4% v IND
Canterbury	Kevin Moss	ALP	6.8%
Rockdale	George Thompson	ALP	6.8%
Smithfield	Carl Scully	ALP	7.0%
Riverstone	John Aquilina	ALP	7.5%
Blacktown	Pam Allan	ALP	8.3%
Wollongong	Gerry Sullivan	ALP	8.6% v IND
East Hills	Pat Rogan	ALP	8.7%
Wyong	Paul Crittenden	ALP	9.0%
Lakemba	Wes Davoren	ALP	9.4%
Ashfield	Paul Whelan	ALP	9.9%
Campbelltown	Michael Knight	ALP	9.9%
Safe
Bankstown	Doug Shedden	ALP	10.1%
Broken Hill	Bill Beckroge	ALP	10.1%
Port Stephens	Bob Martin	ALP	10.1%
Keira	Col Markham	ALP	10.5%
Maroubra	Bob Carr	ALP	10.8%
Peats	Tony Doyle	ALP	11.0%
Fairfield	Geoff Irwin	ALP	11.3%
Kiama	Bob Harrison	ALP	11.4%
Granville	Kim Yeadon	ALP	11.9%
Newcastle	Bryce Gaudry	ALP	12.4% v IND
Lake Macquarie	Jeff Hunter	ALP	12.7%
Mount Druitt	Richard Amery	ALP	13.0%
Charlestown	Richard Face	ALP	13.1%
Bulli	Ian McManus	ALP	13.2%
Wallsend	John Mills	ALP	13.2%
Port Jackson	Sandra Nori	ALP	13.7% v IND
Londonderry	Paul Gibson	ALP	14.0%
Heffron	Deirdre Grusovin	ALP	15.7%
Cabramatta	John Newman	ALP	16.0%
St Marys	Tony Aquilina	ALP	16.4%
Liverpool	Peter Anderson	ALP	16.5%
Auburn	Peter Nagle	ALP	18.1%
Illawarra	Terry Rumble	ALP	19.7%
Marrickville	Andrew Refshauge	ALP	19.8%
Waratah	John Price	ALP	21.0%

== Aftermath ==
The balance of power rested with four independents who held seats that would have normally been held by the Coalition. Both John Hatton in South Coast and Clover Moore in Bligh were re-elected. They were joined by former National Party member Tony Windsor in Tamworth and local councillor Dr Peter Macdonald in Manly. Windsor quickly came to an accommodation with the Government, assuring it of another term. However, the three non-aligned Independents, knowing that Greiner was still in a shaky position, used their numbers to negotiate a comprehensive memorandum of understanding. Signed in October 1991, it was a document that concentrated more on issues of accountability and process rather than specific policies.

Most importantly, the agreement introduced fixed four-year parliamentary terms, a provision entrenched in the Constitution with 76% support at a referendum called in conjunction with the 1995 election.

== See also ==
- Candidates of the 1991 New South Wales state election
