= 2010 Penrith state by-election =

- 19 June 2010
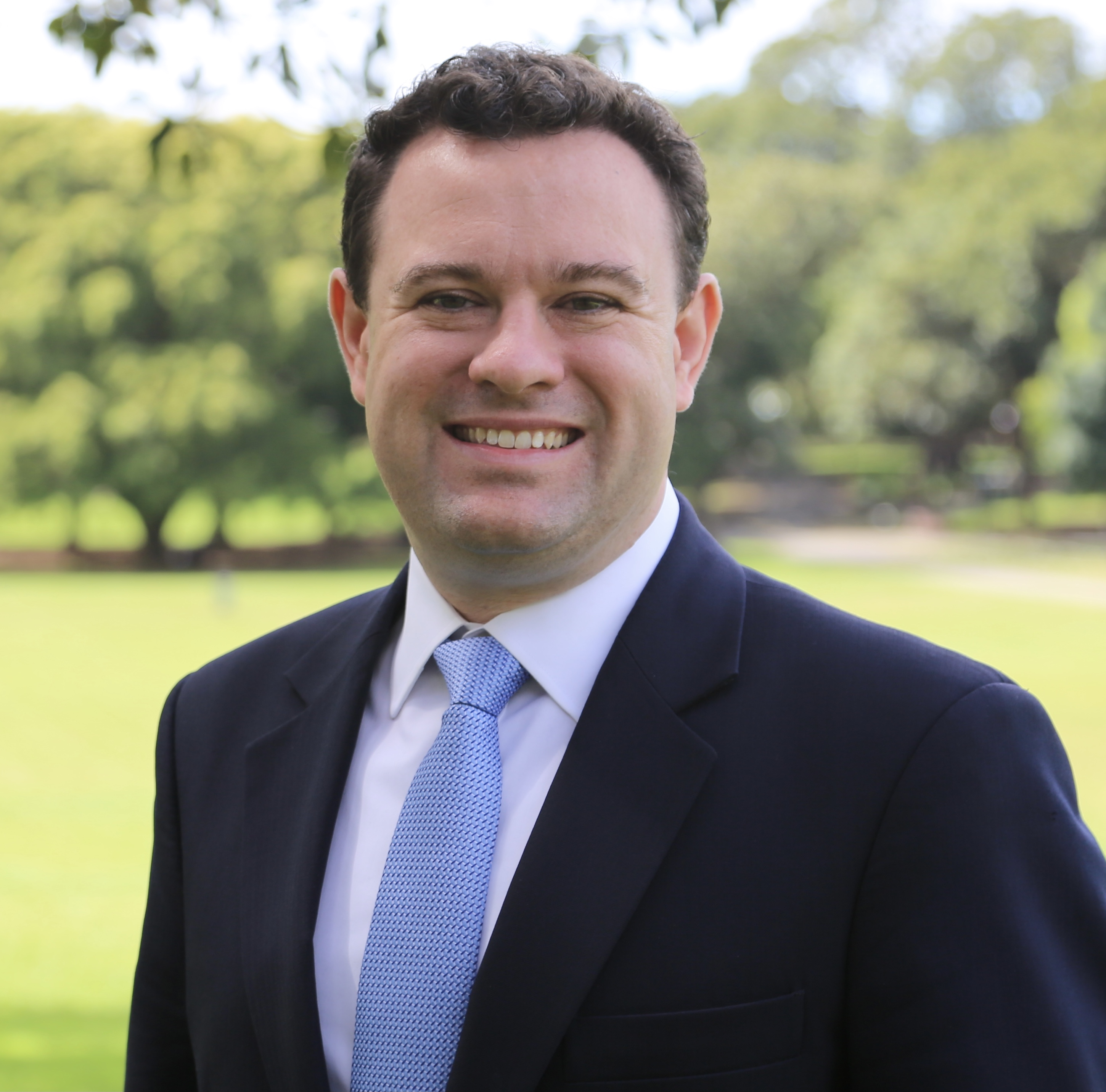

	First party	Second party	Third party
Candidate	Stuart Ayres	John Thain	Susie Wright
Party	Liberal	Labor	Greens
Popular vote	19,856	9,437	4,679
Percentage	51.50%	24.48%	12.14%
Swing	▲18.95pp	▼24.48pp	▲6.57pp
TPP	66.48%	33.52%
TPP swing	▲25.73pp	▼25.73pp
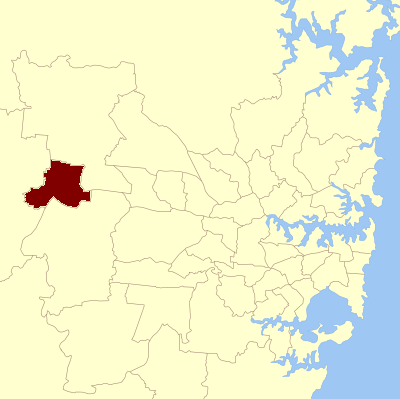
- Location of Penrith in New South Wales
MP before election
Karyn Paluzzano
Labor
Elected MP
Stuart Ayres
Liberal

A by-election was held for the New South Wales Legislative Assembly seat of Penrith on 19 June 2010. The by-election was triggered by the resignation of sitting Labor member and former Parliamentary Secretary for Education and Training Karyn Paluzzano, who had lied to an Independent Commission Against Corruption (ICAC) inquiry over her actions, such as signing false staff payslips and rorting her electoral mail allowance. Paluzzano resigned from Cabinet after she admitted lying to ICAC. Paluzzano resigned from Parliament on 7 May 2010, hours after being suspended from the Labor Party.

Penrith had been in Labor hands for all but one term since its creation in 1974. Labor held it on a majority of 9.1%—a margin that would be considered on the stronger side of fairly safe under normal circumstances (any seat with a two-party margin between 6-10% is considered fairly safe on paper). However, the by-election came at a bad time for the government. In addition to the scandal surrounding Paluzzano, Labor was only polling at 39% support, a marked drop from the 2007 election. While Premier Kristina Keneally had invested considerable time into rehabilitating Labor's image since ousting Nathan Rees in a caucus coup, it was not enough to improve her party's standing in the polls.

The by-election was won by Liberal candidate Stuart Ayres with a 25.7-point two-party swing. The size of this swing, at the time, was the biggest against a sitting NSW government on record; previously, the highest swing was the 23.1 per cent swing achieved by the Liberal Party in the 2008 Ryde by-election. Additionally, this result marked the first time that the Liberal Party achieved a primary vote majority in Penrith, with the Labor primary vote having halved from the last election. Indeed, on paper it turned Penrith from a fairly safe Labor seat into a safe Liberal seat in one stroke.

The loss of Penrith presaged Labor's massive defeat at the 2011 state election nine months later.

== Candidates ==
Candidates are listed in ballot paper order.

Party	Candidate	Notes
Labor Party	John Thain	
Greens	Suzie Wright	
	Mick Saunders	A member of the unregistered Australia First Party.
Liberal Party	Stuart Ayres	Partner of Liberal Senator Marise Payne.
Outdoor Recreation Party	David Leyonhjelm	Contested Bennelong at the 2007 federal election for the Liberty and Democracy Party; former chair of the Shooters Party.
Australian Democrats	Jose Sanz	
Christian Democratic Party	Andrew Green	
Independent	Noel Selby	

== Results ==
Penrith state by-election, 2010
Party	Candidate	Votes	%	±%
Liberal	Stuart Ayres	19,856	51.50	+18.95
Labor	John Thain	9,437	24.48	−24.19
Greens	Suzie Wright	4,679	12.14	+6.57
Christian Democrats	Andrew Green	1,692	4.39	−1.81
Independent	Noel Selby	1,047	2.72	+2.72
Independent Australia First	Mick Saunders	766	1.99	+1.99
Outdoor Recreation	David Leyonhjelm	721	1.87	+1.87
Democrats	Jose Sanz	358	0.93	+0.04
Total formal votes		38,556	96.78	−0.49
Informal votes		1,282	3.22	+0.49
Turnout		39,838	86.04	−5.14
Two-party-preferred result
Liberal	Stuart Ayres	21,831	66.48	+25.73
Labor	John Thain	11,009	33.52	−25.73
Liberal gain from Labor		Swing	+25.73	
