= Electoral district of Mulgoa =

Mulgoa New South Wales—Legislative Assembly
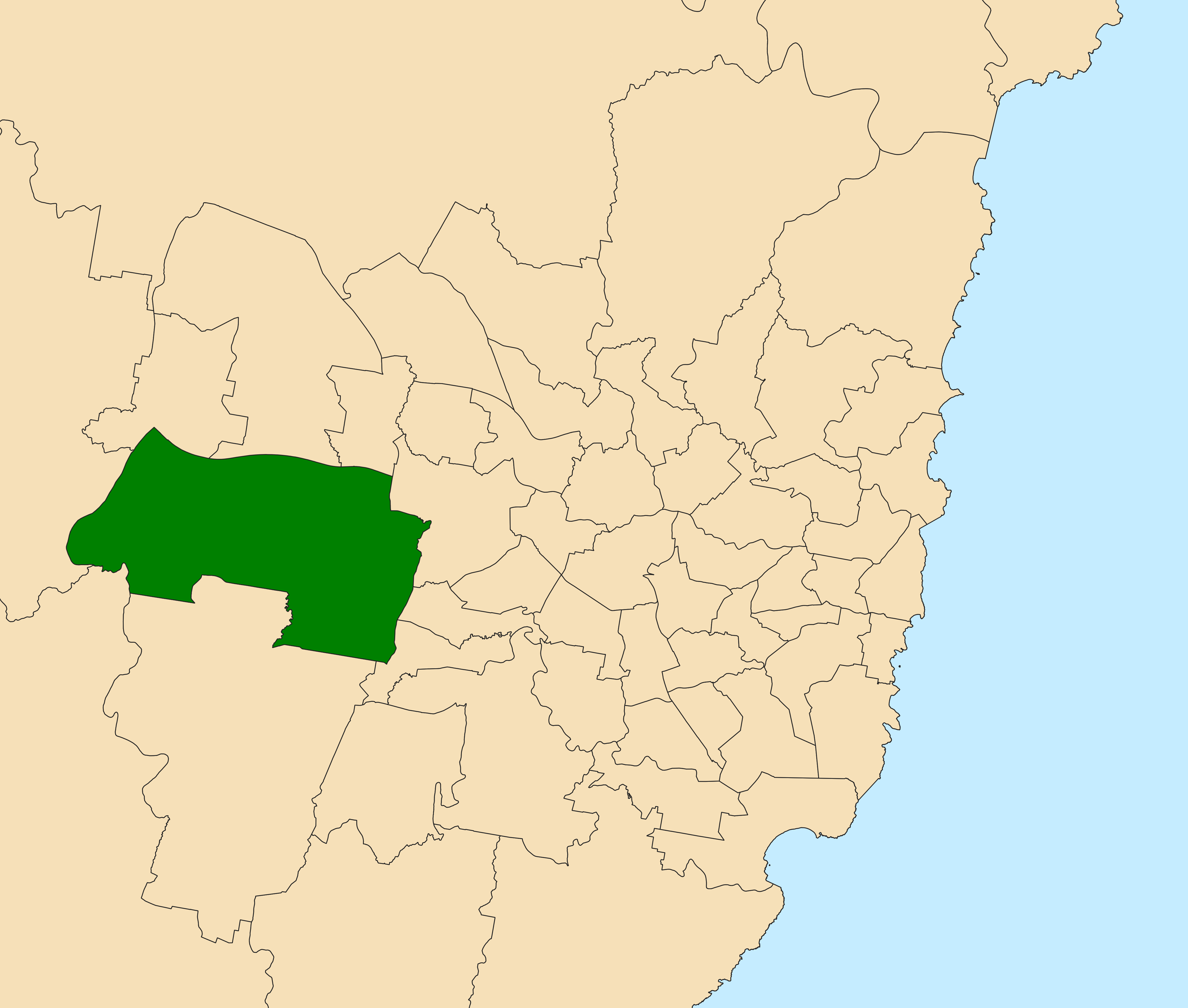
- Location within Sydney
- State: New South Wales
- Dates current: 1988–1991; 1999–2023
- Electors: 58,259 (2019)
- Area: 272.66 km^{2} (105.3 sq mi)
- Demographic: Outer-metropolitan
Electorates around Mulgoa:
Penrith	Londonderry	Mount Druitt
Blue Mountains	Mulgoa	Cabramatta; Prospect
Wollondilly	Camden	Liverpool

Mulgoa was an electoral district of the Legislative Assembly in the Australian state of New South Wales.

Mulgoa included the suburbs of Abbotsbury, Austral, Badgerys Creek, Cecil Hills, Cecil Park, Eastern Creek, Elizabeth Hills, Erskine Park, Glenmore Park, Horsley Park, Kemps Creek, Luddenham, Middleton Grange, Mount Vernon, Mulgoa, Orchard Hills, Regentville, St Clair, Wallacia and West Hoxton.

Mulgoa was originally created 1988, but was abolished in 1991, when it was largely replaced by Badgerys Creek. It was recreated in 1999, largely replacing Badgerys Creek. As a result of a redistribution in 2021, Mulgoa was once again abolished at the 2023 election, replaced by a new incarnation of Badgerys Creek.

== Members for Mulgoa ==
First incarnation (1988–1991)
Member	Party	Term
Tony Aquilina	Labor	1988–1991
Second incarnation (1999–2023)
Member	Party	Term
Diane Beamer	Labor	1999–2011
Tanya Davies	Liberal	2011–2023

== Election results ==
2019 New South Wales state election: Mulgoa
Party	Candidate	Votes	%	±%
Liberal	Tanya Davies	29,379	57.19	+3.91
Labor	Todd Carney	17,270	33.62	−1.42
Greens	Rob Shield	2,897	5.64	+1.44
Sustainable Australia	Jessie Bijok	1,829	3.56	+3.56
Total formal votes		51,375	95.87	+0.10
Informal votes		2,213	4.13	−0.10
Turnout		53,588	91.98	−1.08
Two-party-preferred result
Liberal	Tanya Davies	29,910	61.33	+1.67
Labor	Todd Carney	18,858	38.67	−1.67
Liberal hold		Swing	+1.67	
