= Electoral district of Carlingford =

State electoral district of New South Wales, Australia

Carlingford was an electoral district of the Legislative Assembly in the Australian State of New South Wales from 1988 to 1991, named after the suburb of Carlingford. In 1999, it was replaced by Baulkham Hills. Its only member was Wayne Merton, representing the Liberal Party.

== Members for Carlingford ==
Member	Party	Term
Wayne Merton	Liberal	1988–1991

== Election results ==
=== 1988 ===
1988 New South Wales state election: Carlingford
Party	Candidate	Votes	%	±%
Liberal	Wayne Merton	20,171	68.2	+9.1
Labor	Jenifer Klugman	9,420	31.8	−1.3
Total formal votes		29,591	96.4	−1.5
Informal votes		1,105	3.6	+1.5
Turnout		30,696	95.5	
Liberal notional hold		Swing	+5.2	
