= Orange Grove affair =

2004 Political scandal in New South Wales, Australia

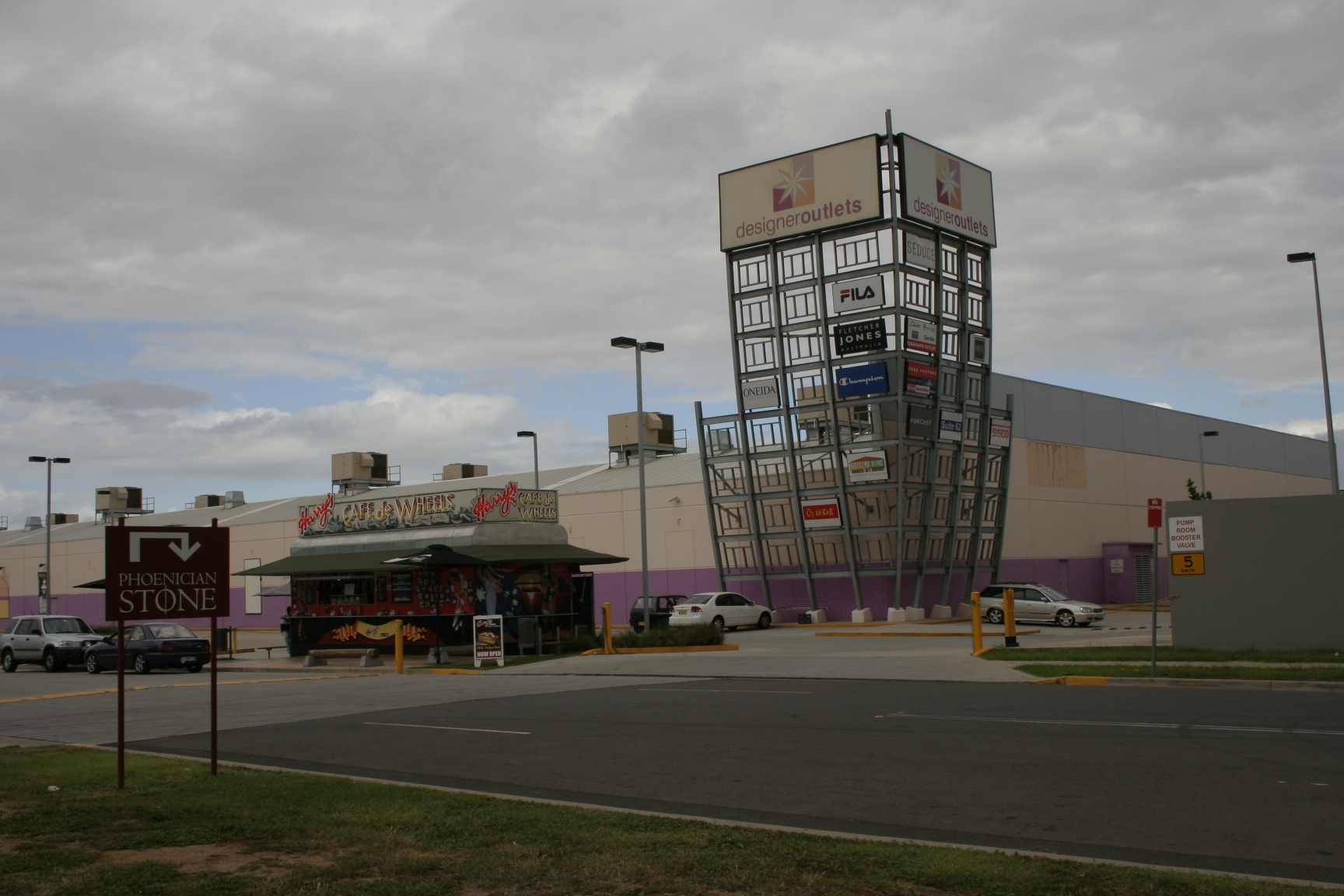
Orange Grove designer outlets 2007

The Orange Grove affair was a political scandal in Australia concerning the dealings of the New South Wales state Australian Labor Party government with multinational corporation The Westfield Group. It resulted from a court decision in 2004 to force the closure of the Orange Grove shopping centre after a zoning dispute, with the loss of approximately 200 jobs. Westfield, which owned a nearby shopping centre, had challenged the legitimacy of the Orange Grove centre, which was operating on land not zoned for this purpose.

When the courts ruled in Westfield's favour, Liverpool City Council sought State Government approval for a retrospective rezoning, to validate its earlier decision to approve the shopping centre. The State Government declined to intervene, despite a planning report suggesting that course of action, and the retail component of the Orange Grove centre was forced to close. The bulky goods component of the centre remained open, as the centre was legally zoned for bulky goods sales.

However, the State Opposition subsequently unearthed information about a meeting between Premier Bob Carr's chief of staff and a prominent Westfield employee, sparking allegations that interference from Westfield had played a role in the government's decision not to intervene. As a result, a parliamentary inquiry was commissioned, and the Independent Commission Against Corruption announced an investigation. The investigation concluded in 2005, with no findings of corruption against any person. However, the Commission recommended that the NSW Government strengthen guidelines for public servants dealing with corruption allegations by lobbyists.

== Background ==
In March 2002, Frank Mosca, an architect working on behalf of Sydney businessman Nabil Gazal, applied to change an existing development consent for a property in a light industrial area on Orange Grove Road in the Sydney suburb of Warwick Farm, just north of central Liverpool to change the permitted use of the site from "bulky goods/ warehousing" to "warehouse clearance outlet". This was intended to permit the building of an "outlet mall", mainly consisting of retailing, although described as "factory outlets", even though the area was zoned under its Local Environment Plan (LEP) for industrial uses, in which retailing was generally forbidden, except for a limited range of "bulky goods" or goods produced on the premises. The zoning was consistent with a long-standing policy of discouraging retailing away from established centres with good transport connections, currently embodied as a draft State Environmental Planning Policy: Integration of Land Use and Transport (SEPP 66). The Orange Grove site had poor bus connections only and none on Sundays.

In due course Council officers advised that a new development application was required, and this was submitted on 5 June. On 13 June the Council wrote to Mosca clearly stating what retailing activities could be carried out on the site according to the LEP. Mr Mosca submitted a Statement of Environmental Effects in July, which argued that "warehouse clearance outlets" were not specifically prohibited by the LEP, and therefore Council could consent to them. The development application was eventually advertised for public comment in November and no comments having been received it was decided that under council rules it could be approved at officer level, without reference to a Council committee. Immediately following the end of the comment period on 15 December, an officer of Liverpool City Council approved the development application, apparently satisfied that "warehouse clearance outlets" were not forbidden by the LEP. Prior to the approval, the Orange Centre commenced trading in November, with Craig Knowles, the local member and state Planning Minister, attending the official opening.

== Legal action ==
On 17 June 2003, the Westfield Group, which operates a 3-level, similarly large shopping centre 1 kilometre southward of the Orange Grove site, within the Liverpool central business district, commenced legal action in the Land and Environment Court arguing that a retail outlet operating out of an industrial zone was contrary to the council's LEP. On 8 December, the Liverpool City Council decided to amend the LEP to introduce a new definition for "outlet centre" and retrospectively rezone the Orange Centre site. On 16 January 2004, the court ruled in favour of Westfield and ordered the closure of the centre's retail activities, with a deadline ultimately extended to 30 June. This verdict was subsequently upheld by the Court of Appeal on 31 March.

While the dispute had been ongoing, the Carr government had sacked the strife-torn Liverpool council, after a series of incidents of economic mismanagement, and on 16 March, it appointed Gabrielle Kibble, the daughter of former Governor-General John Kerr, as administrator. On 14 April, Kibble forwarded an application for a retrospective rezoning as an amendment to the Liverpool Local Environment Plan (LEP) to the Minister Assisting the Minister for Infrastructure and Planning (Planning Administration), Diane Beamer, as required by planning legislation.

== Consideration of retrospective amendment to LEP ==
On 15 April 2004, Mark Ryan, Director of Corporate Affairs, Westfield, phoned Premier Carr's Chief of Staff, Graeme Wedderburn and suggested that the original Liverpool Council planning decision for the centre had been approved corruptly. Next day Wedderburn discussed the allegation with Carr and with Minister Beamer's Chief of Staff, Michael Meagher. He later phoned Beamer directly and told her to "be wary of things that come out of Liverpool. There had been some allegations from Westfield." On 19 April, Ryan met Wedderburn and gave more details of his claims about Liverpool City Council, but conceded that he had no hard evidence. Wedderburn told Beamer, at a meeting on 20 April, "You should be very careful, you should take great care not to be influenced, subject to any undue influence, not to be inappropriately lobbied in making this plan, in making decisions here", according to Meagher. Nevertheless, according to evidence subsequently presented at ICAC, Wedderburn made no suggestion as to what Beamer's decision on the proposed variation to the LEP should be. During ICAC's subsequent investigations, it focused on whether these corruption allegation affected Bealmer's subsequent decision not to amend the LEP.

On 16 June, the Department of Infrastructure, Planning and Natural Resources, advised Beamer to approve Liverpool City Council's proposed variation to its LEP that would have retrospectively validated the planning approval for the shopping centre. The Department's head, Jennifer Westacott, contradicted this recommendation in a memorandum signed on 25 June. Beamer's Chief of Staff, Michael Meagher, later told the Independent Commission Against Corruption (ICAC),"…what we had was something I’d never seen before. It was highly unusual, and it was, I suppose confusing in a way too."

As the date for the centre's closure, set for mid-2004, drew closer, both sides increased the pressure. Westfield declared that an A$150 million redevelopment of its own centre was under threat if Orange Grove was allowed to continue operating, and suggested that Orange Grove could cause the loss of up to A$18 million a year from the local economy. After further discussions with Westacott and a further memorandum, Beamer declined to approve the proposed variation on the grounds that the shopping centre tended to undermine the viability of the Liverpool shopping centre, on 8 July 2004.

== Corruption allegations ==
On 10 July 2004, Gazal, Orange Grove's owner, signed a statutory declaration alleging that he had been told by Labor member Joe Tripodi on 22 May that the retrospective approval would be denied by Beamer. Furthermore, he alleged that Tripodi had told him that Carr had directly instructed Beamer to reject the proposal after having contact with Westfield. In addition, Samir Bargshoon, a contract cleaner and friend of Gazal, signed a statutory declaration alleging that he had heard, on the same day, Tripodi say that Beamer had told him that Carr had instructed her not to sign the rezoning of the Liverpool designer outlets. Gazal's solicitor, Joseph D’Agostino, also signed a statutory declaration containing an allegation that Tripodi had indicated that the planning issue was being handled "at a higher level then (sic) himself." Mosca, the shopping centre's architect signed a statutory declaration alleging that Tripodi had said, in relation to the rezoning, "Carr rang Beamer and asked her to screw it over".

Gazal's allegations received substantial media attention, and led to both the state opposition and the Sydney tabloid The Daily Telegraph becoming involved. It subsequently emerged that the Department of Infrastructure, Planning and Natural Resources submission to Minister Beamer had supported the rezoning of the centre, due to the number of jobs that would be lost if it were to close. Then Opposition Leader, John Brogden, tabled a draft press release in parliament that would have announced Beamer's decision to support Kibble's proposal.

It also emerged that Mark Ryan, a senior Westfield lobbyist, had telephoned Graeme Wedderburn, the Premier's chief of staff, on 15 April 2003, two days after Kibble had publicly supported the rezoning. Wedderburn had then met Ryan and Craig Marshall, another Westfield executive, on 19 April. Though Wedderburn strongly defended his actions, he also publicly admitted that Orange Grove had been the focus of these meetings. Premier Carr, Wedderburn and Beamer all faced questions from the media over alleged links between the two events.

== ICAC investigation ==
ICAC investigated these matters, holding public hearings from December 2004 to 23 March 2005 and reporting in August. It found that the original decision by Liverpool Council on the planning application was not corrupt. It found that Ryan's claims of corruption in the original decision were possibly "mischievous", but not corrupt. It did not consider that there was anything corrupt in the behaviour of Premier Carr, Wedderburn or Meagher. It scrutinised Westacott's advocacy but found no suggestion of impropriety. It concluded that Wedderburn's expression of concern about possible corruption in relation to the original decision by Liverpool Council had no significant effect on Minister Beamer's decision to reject the revised LEP, which could be justified on legitimate planning grounds.

In relation to Tripodi, ICAC suggested that Tripodi might have been "content to be enlisted as the Gazcorp troubleshooter to perform a task which, in his opinion, was not difficult at all but which would raise his standing in the eyes of those who enlisted him", but when he lost confidence that Beamer would approve the proposed amendment of the LEP, he attempted on 22 May "to distance himself from this unfortunate result by ascribing to higher powers or to those with influence beyond his control the true cause of the likely rejection of the LEP amendment".

ICAC found no evidence of corruption, but recommended that the NSW Government improve its guidelines on dealing with lobbyists. It also recommended that the Government adopt better protocols for ministers and their staff for dealing with allegations of corruption in relation to external parties. It noted that current guidelines were based on public service guidelines, and instructed ministerial staff to "report unethical behaviour or suspected corrupt to senior management", without explaining who "senior management" were. Finally, it recommended that the Government finalise State Environmental Planning Policy 66 - Integration of Land Use and Transport.
