= Electoral district of Minchinbury =

Former state electoral district of New South Wales, Australia

Minchinbury was an electoral district of the Legislative Assembly in the Australian state of New South Wales from 1988 to 1991, which included the suburb of Minchinbury. Its only member was Anne Cohen, a member of the Liberal Party. It was replaced by Badgerys Creek.

== Members for Minchinbury ==
Member	Party	Term
Anne Cohen	Liberal	1988–1991

== Election results ==
=== 1988 ===
1988 New South Wales state election: Minchinbury
Party	Candidate	Votes	%	±%
Liberal	Anne Cohen	12,417	40.0	+2.1
Labor	Gregory Lucas	12,008	38.6	−19.9
Independent EFF	Joe Bryant	6,652	21.4	+21.4
Total formal votes		31,077	96.1	−1.0
Informal votes		1,271	3.9	+1.0
Turnout		32,348	94.2	
Two-party-preferred result
Liberal	Anne Cohen	15,469	52.5	+12.9
Labor	Gregory Lucas	13,996	47.5	−12.9
Liberal notional gain from Labor		Swing	+12.9	
