= David Elliott (politician) =

Australian former politician (born 1970)

The Honourable David Elliott
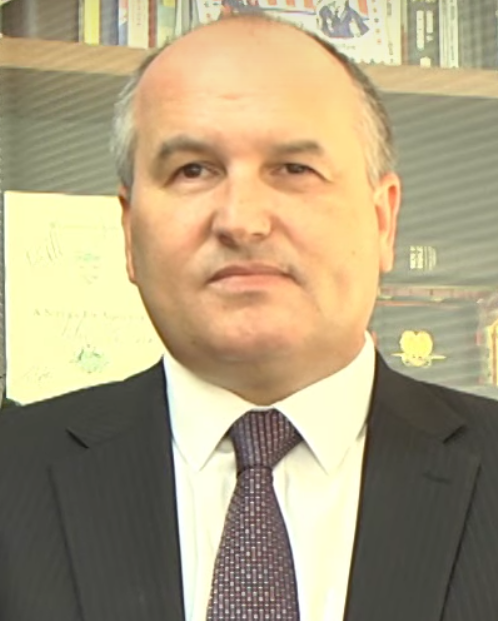
- Elliott in 2015

Minister for Transport
- In office 21 December 2021 – 28 March 2023
- Premier: Dominic Perrottet
- Preceded by: Paul Toole (as Minister for Transport and Roads)
- Succeeded by: Jo Haylen

Minister for Veterans
- In office 21 December 2021 – 28 March 2023
- Premier: Dominic Perrottet
- Preceded by: Natalie Ward (as Minister for Sport, Multiculturalism, Seniors and Veterans)
- Succeeded by: David Harris

Minister for Western Sydney
- In office 5 August 2022 – 28 March 2023
- Premier: Dominic Perrottet
- Preceded by: Stuart Ayres
- Succeeded by: Prue Car

Minister for Police and Emergency Services
- In office 2 April 2019 – 21 December 2021
- Premier: Gladys Berejiklian; Dominic Perrottet
- Preceded by: Troy Grant
- Succeeded by: Paul Toole (as Minister for Police)

Minister for Counter Terrorism
- In office 30 January 2017 – 23 March 2019
- Premier: Gladys Berejiklian
- Preceded by: new portfolio
- Succeeded by: Anthony Roberts (as Minister for Counter Terrorism and Corrections)

Minister for Corrections
- In office 2 April 2015 – 23 March 2019
- Premier: Mike Baird; Gladys Berejiklian
- Preceded by: Brad Hazzard (as Minister for Justice)
- Succeeded by: Anthony Roberts (as Minister for Counter Terrorism and Corrections)

Minister for Veterans Affairs
- In office 2 April 2015 – 23 March 2019
- Premier: Mike Baird; Gladys Berejiklian
- Preceded by: Victor Dominello
- Succeeded by: John Sidoti (as Minister for Sport, Multiculturalism, Seniors and Veterans)

Minister for Emergency Services
- In office 2 April 2015 – 30 January 2017
- Premier: Mike Baird
- Preceded by: Stuart Ayres (as Minister for Police and Emergency Services)
- Succeeded by: Troy Grant

Member of the New South Wales Legislative Assembly for Baulkham Hills
- In office 26 March 2011 – 25 March 2023
- Preceded by: Wayne Merton
- Succeeded by: district abolished

Personal details
- Born: 11 June 1970 (age 56)
- Party: Liberal
- Education: University of Western Sydney; Royal Military College, Duntroon; University of New England; Charles Sturt University
- Occupation: Former chief executive officer former army officer
- Awards: Australian Service Medal Australian Defence Medal Centenary Medal Order of Saint John (chartered 1888)

Military service
- Allegiance: Australia
- Branch/service: Australian Army
- Years of service: 1995–1997, 2000
- Rank: Captain
- Battles/wars: Bougainville Peacekeeping Operation

David Andrew Elliott (born 11 June 1970) is an Australian former politician. Elliott served as the New South Wales Minister for Transport and the Minister for Veterans in the Perrottet ministry between 21 December 2021 and 25 March 2023. Elliott was a member of the New South Wales Legislative Assembly representing Baulkham Hills for the Liberal Party between 2011 and 2023.

Elliott served as the Minister for Police and Emergency Services between April 2019 and December 2021 in the second Berejiklian ministry and the first arrangement of the Perrottet ministry. Elliott was Minister for Counter Terrorism from January 2017 until March 2019 and Minister for Corrections and Minister for Veterans Affairs from April 2015 until March 2019 in the first Berejiklian ministry. He was Minister for Emergency Services between 2015 and 2017 in the second Baird government.

== Early years and background ==
In 1995, Elliott joined the Australian Army and commenced his officer training at Royal Military College, Duntroon, attaining the rank of Captain in April 1997. Taking 18 months' leave, he worked as Press Secretary for the Hon. Peter Collins, QC MP who was elected NSW Leader of the Opposition following the 1995 state election. During 1999, Elliott was Director for the Australians for Constitutional Monarchy campaign against the referendum for Australia to become a republic; for which he was awarded the Centenary Medal on 1 January 2001 for service to the constitutional reform debate.

Returning to the Army in 2000, Elliott served in peace-keeping forces in Bouganville, Papua New Guinea and was awarded the Australian Service Medal. For the next four years, Elliott worked as state operations manager in St John Ambulance (NSW), before commencing as Executive Officer of the Australian Hotels Association, and later becoming Deputy chief executive officer. In 2008, Elliott became chief executive officer of the Civil Contractors Federation and held this position until his election to Parliament.

Elliott was a director of Castle Hill RSL Club Limited from 2009 to 2016. Elliott was a director of Life Education Australia between 2009 and 2011, and a member of Sydney Chamber of Commerce from 2008 to 2011. Between 1992 and 2001, he held a range of Liberal Party elected positions.

== Political career ==
On 16 June 2007, Elliott sought Liberal Party pre-selection for the federal seat of Mitchell, but lost by a margin of 20 votes to 81 against Alex Hawke, then an advisor to Ray Williams MP. Paul Blanch, a grazier from Orange, received 8 votes. Alan Cadman, who had been the member for Mitchell since 1974, chose not to contest the pre-selection, but was later quoted as saying that this was due to "relentless branch-stacking within the electorate." In February 2010, Elliott unsuccessfully sought Liberal Party pre-selection for the Legislative Council of New South Wales in a bitter and public battle with David Clarke, a member of the Liberal's so called 'religious right' faction.

Following the announcement of the retirement of sitting Liberal member, Wayne Merton, Elliott won party pre-selection for the NSW seat of Baulkham Hills, running against Baulkham Hills Councillor Mike Thomas and solicitor Damien Tudehope. At the 2011 election, Elliott was elected to the safe Liberal seat with a swing of 14.4 points and won the seat with 76.4 per cent of the two-party vote. Elliott's main opponent was Tony Hay, representing Labor.

Following the 2015 state election, Elliott was sworn in as the Minister for Emergency Services, the Minister for Corrections, and the Minister for Veterans Affairs in the second Baird government. On 30 January 2017, Elliott was sworn in as the Minister for Counter-Terrorism, the Minister for Corrections, and the Minister for Veterans Affairs in the first Berejiklian ministry.

On 18 October 2018 Elliott used parliamentary privilege in the Legislative Assembly to raise an allegation that Luke Foley, at the time leader of the opposition, had "a little bit too much to drink at a party and harassed an ABC journalist." Later that month, ABC journalist Ashleigh Raper released a statement, alleging that at an event in November 2016, Foley "placed his hand down the back of her dress and inside her underpants." Hours later, Foley read a statement in which he resigned as leader of the Labor Party, but denied the allegation and said he would commence defamation proceedings in the Federal Court.

Following the 2019 state election, Elliott was sworn in as the Minister for Police and Emergency Services in the second Berejiklian ministry, with effect from 2 April 2019. He served in this role in the first arrangement of the Perrottet ministry and was sworn in as Minister for Transport and Minister for Veterans in December 2021 in the second arrangement of the ministry.

On 23 October 2022, Elliott announced he will not be contesting the 2023 state election.

== Controversies ==
In November 2019, Elliott was cleared by police following an investigation into an alleged road rage incident involving a 17-year-old P-plate driver. Elliot had told the P-plate driver he "worked for the cops".

Also in November 2019, Elliott responded to revelations police strip-searched 122 girls by stating he would want officers to search his own children if "they were at risk of doing something wrong".

In December 2019, he attracted attention for an offensive post on Facebook, in which he told a "mate" that he'd "rip your head off and s--- in the hole".

In December 2019, Elliott was denounced for deciding to take a holiday to Europe during the Black Summer bushfires, one of the worst bushfire disasters in the country's history. He faced heavy criticism because of his role as New South Wales Emergency Services Minister, with New South Wales being by far the worst-hit area of the country, with bushfires throughout NSW destroying almost a thousand houses and killing or displacing a billion animals, with nine people killed, including three firefighters. He was not helped by the fact that just a week earlier, the federal Liberal Party leader and prime minister, Scott Morrison, faced similar criticism for going on a holiday to Hawaii.

Elliott responded to the claims by saying he would keep bushfire-affected communities and firefighters in his thoughts while on holiday. After public pressure and criticism following catastrophic fires on 31 December 2019, Elliott "apparently" backflipped and returned home from his European trip.

On 9 March 2020, the NSW Police announced an investigation into whether Elliott's use of highly restricted firearms broke the law.

On 21 February 2022, the passenger rail network in NSW was shut down after Transport for NSW and the RTBU failed to reach an agreement in their ongoing enterprise agreement negotiations. This shutdown was particularly noteworthy as it occurred on the same day that Australia's international border reopened (after being closed for two years in response to the COVID-19 pandemic).

As Minister for Transport, Elliott attracted criticism for appearing to be unaware of the sequence of events which led to the shutdown, accusing the RTBU of engaging in "terrorist-like activity", and for claiming that he did not know a shutdown would occur until the morning of Monday 21 February as he would have been asleep by 10pm the previous night.

Following the handling of the shutdown, Elliott was rebuked by Premier Perrottet who stated “My expectation is that ministers are available around the clock. I certainly am, and I expect the same of my ministers”.

In January 2023, Elliott revealed that he had tipped off Perrottet about the existence of evidence of him wearing a Nazi uniform to his 21st birthday.

== ICAC investigation (Operation Rosny) ==
In August 2026, Elliott was questioned at the ICAC investigation into allegations of corruption involving the New South Wales branch of the Liberal Party, the CEO of Catholic Schools NSW Dallas McInerney, the property developer Jean Nassif, the hotelier Michael O’Hara, certain Strathfield councillors, and others.

Elliott told the inquiry that he had come to believe that “a cult had taken over the [Liberal] party” after branch stacking by the religious right faction in The Hills region of Sydney. He revealed that he had received death threats after he opposed developments by property developer and Liberal Party donor, Jean Nassif, whose donations were alleged to be designed to obtain favourable planning decisions.

Elliott appeared as a witness and there was no investigation into his time as a minister. He said that the "battle" of fighting corruption in the parliament was not over, and claimed there were still people in the Liberal shadow ministry "who gave evidence to criminals".

== Honours and awards ==

Order of St John	
Australian Service Medal	with BOUGAINVILLE clasp
Centenary Medal	1 January 2001
Australian Defence Medal	

New South Wales Legislative Assembly
Preceded by Wayne Merton	Member for Baulkham Hills; 2011–2023	Seat abolished
Political offices
Preceded by Victor Dominello	Minister for Veterans Affairs; 2015–2019	Succeeded by John Sidoti as Minister for Sport, Multiculturalism, Seniors and Veterans
Preceded by Stuart Ayres as Minister for Police and Emergency Services	Minister for Emergency Services; 2015–2017	Succeeded by Troy Grant
Preceded by Brad Hazzard as Minister for Justice	Minister for Corrections; 2015–2019	Succeeded by Anthony Roberts as Minister for Counter Terrorism and Corrections
New title	Minister for Counter Terrorism; 2017–2019	Succeeded by Anthony Roberts as Minister for Counter Terrorism and Corrections
Preceded by Troy Grant as Minister for Police and as Minister for Emergency Services	Minister for Police and Emergency Services; 2019–2021	Succeeded by Paul Toole as Minister for Police
Preceded by Troy Grant as Minister for Police and as Minister for Emergency Services	Minister for Police and Emergency Services; 2019–2021	Succeeded by Steph Cooke as Minister for Emergency Services and Resilience
Preceded by Rob Stokes as Minister for Transport and Roads	Minister for Transport; 2021–2023	Succeeded by Jo Haylen
Preceded by Natalie Ward as Minister for Sport, Multiculturalism, Seniors and Veterans	Minister for Veterans; 2021–2023	Succeeded by David Harris
Preceded by Stuart Ayres	Minister for Western Sydney; 2022–2023	Succeeded by Prue Car
