= Stuart Ayres =

Former Australian politician (born 1980)

The Honourable Stuart Ayres
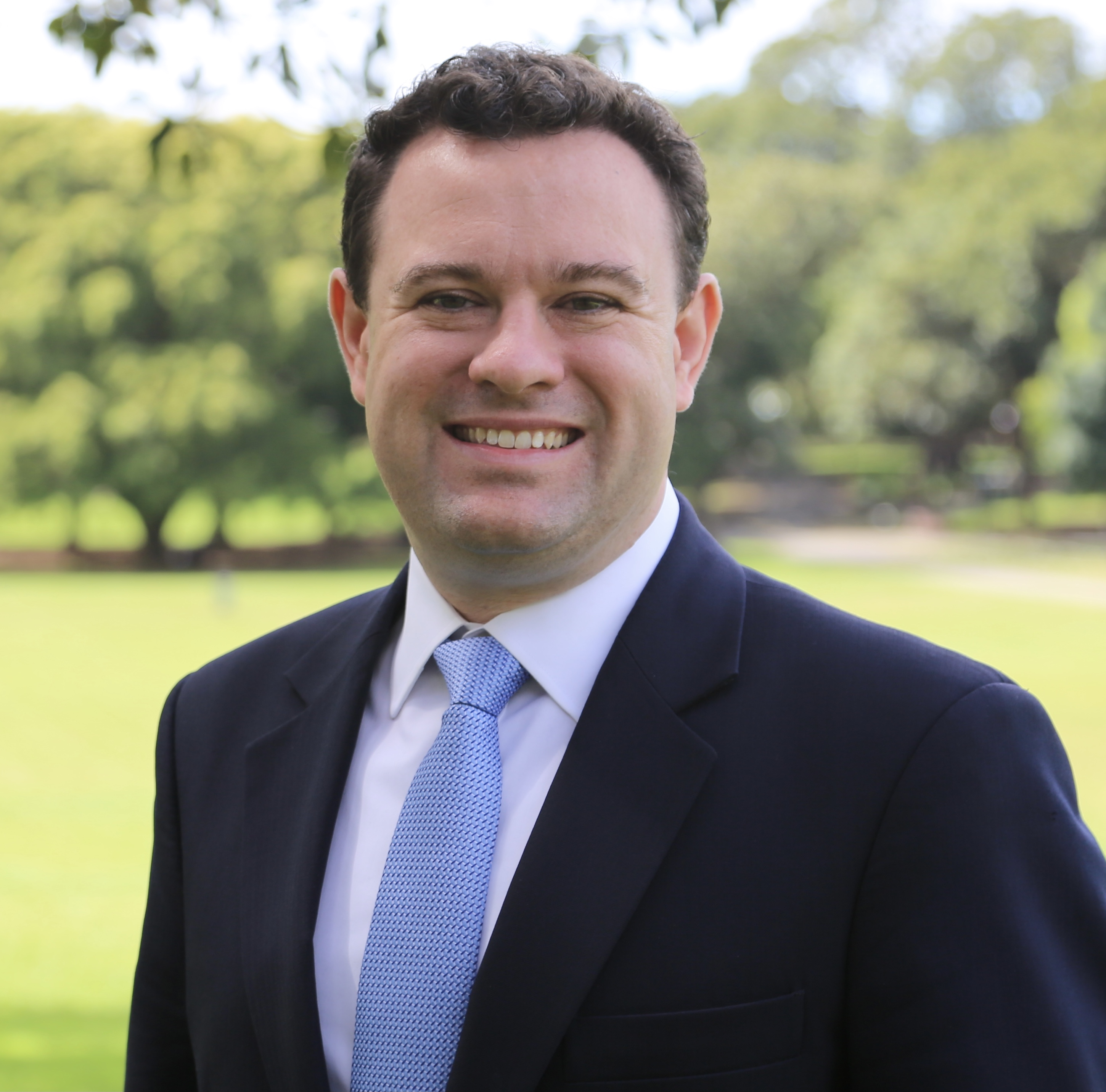

Deputy Leader of the Liberal Party in New South Wales
- In office 5 October 2021 – 3 August 2022
- Leader: Dominic Perrottet
- Preceded by: Dominic Perrottet
- Succeeded by: Matt Kean

Minister for Western Sydney
- In office 30 January 2017 – 5 August 2022
- Premier: Gladys Berejiklian; Dominic Perrottet
- Preceded by: Mike Baird
- Succeeded by: David Elliott

Minister for Tourism
- In office 2 April 2019 – 5 August 2022
- Premier: Gladys Berejiklian; Dominic Perrottet
- Preceded by: Adam Marshall (as Minister for Tourism and Major Events)
- Succeeded by: Ben Franklin

Minister for Investment
- In office 2 April 2019 – 5 August 2022
- Premier: Gladys Berejiklian; Dominic Perrottet
- Succeeded by: Alister Henskens (as Minister for Enterprise, Investment and Trade)

Minister for Sport
- In office 21 December 2021 – 5 August 2022
- Premier: Dominic Perrottet
- Preceded by: Natalie Ward (as Minister for Sport, Multiculturalism, Seniors and Veterans)
- Succeeded by: Alister Henskens (as Minister for Enterprise, Investment and Trade)
- In office 23 April 2014 – 2 April 2019
- Premier: Mike Baird; Gladys Berejiklian
- Preceded by: Gabrielle Upton (as Minister for Sport and Recreation)
- Succeeded by: John Sidoti (as Minister for Sport, Multiculturalism, Seniors and Veterans)

Member of the New South Wales Legislative Assembly for Penrith
- In office 19 June 2010 – 25 March 2023
- Preceded by: Karyn Paluzzano
- Succeeded by: Karen McKeown

Personal details
- Born: Stuart Laurence Ayres; 24 November 1980 (age 45)
- Party: Liberal
- Domestic partner: Marise Payne (2007–2024)
- Education: St Dominic's College
- Alma mater: ACPE

Stuart Laurence Ayres (born 24 November 1980) is an Australian politician. He was a member of the New South Wales Legislative Assembly from 19 June 2010 to 25 March 2023, representing the electorate of Penrith as a member of the Liberal Party.

He also served as the Deputy Leader of the New South Wales Liberal Party in the Perrottet ministry from October 2021 to August 2022 and was the New South Wales Minister for Enterprise, Investment and Trade, the Minister for Tourism and Sport, and the Minister for Western Sydney from December 2021 to August 2022, until his resignation due to an investigation into his role in the John Barilaro trade commissioner scandal.

Ayres has previously served as the Minister for Jobs, Investment, Tourism and Western Sydney and as the Minister for Trade and Industry from October to December 2021; as the Minister for Jobs, Investment, Tourism and Western Sydney in the second Berejiklian ministry; as the Minister for Sport from April 2014, as the Minister for WestConnex and as the Minister for Western Sydney from January 2017 until March 2019 in the first Berejiklian ministry; as the Minister for Trade, Tourism and Major Events between 2015 and 2017; as the Minister for Police and Emergency Services during 2014 and 2015; as the Minister Assisting the Premier on Western Sydney between 2013 and 2015; and as the Minister for Fair Trading between 2013 and 2014.

== Personal life ==
Ayres was born to a father serving in the Australian Defence Force which resulted in his moving to various locations across Australia until settling in Penrith in 1993. Ayres was educated at St Dominic's College in Kingswood. Ayres played Australian rules football for Penrith Australian Football Club.

He was the partner of former Liberal Senator Marise Payne. In 2024, Payne and Ayres separated.

In April 2024, Ayres was appointed as the CEO of the Urban Development Institute of Australia.

== Early career ==
Ayres graduated in 1999 with a degree in sports business from the Australian College of Physical Education and worked as a development officer for the Australian Football League before joining the staff of the member for Lindsay, Jackie Kelly, in her capacity as the then Minister for Sport and Tourism and the Minister assisting the Prime Minister for the Sydney 2000 Olympic Games.

Ayres was an account executive for Austereo, and returned to the Australian College of Physical Education in 2008, initially as student recruitment manager and then later as director of marketing and business development.

Ayres has been heavily involved in the administration of local sport in Western Sydney where he has been a board member of the Penrith Australian Football Club for 10 years and was also the founding secretary of the Penrith Valley Sports Foundation.

== Political career ==
Ayres was elected at the Penrith state by-election on 19 June 2010, receiving 66.3% of the two-party-preferred vote. Ayres took the previously safe Labor seat on a 25.7-point swing—the largest swing against a sitting government in New South Wales history. This turned Penrith into a safe Liberal seat at one stroke. Indeed, Ayres' primary-vote margin was enough to win the seat without the need for preferences. Like his partner, Marise Payne, Ayres is member of the Liberals' Moderate faction, and is a republican. In his maiden speech to parliament, he voiced his support for Australia to have an Australian head of state and become a republic.

Following his re-election in March 2011, Ayres was elected to the position of deputy government whip in the NSW Legislative Assembly. Since then, he was promoted to Parliamentary Secretary for Roads and Transport and appointed as the Premier's Parliamentary Secretary for Western Sydney. In December 2013, Ayres was appointed as the Minister for Fair Trading and as the Minister Assisting the Premier on Western Sydney. Due to the resignation of Barry O'Farrell as Premier, and the subsequent ministerial reshuffle by Mike Baird, the new Liberal Leader, in April 2014 in addition to his existing ministerial responsibilities, Ayres was appointed Minister for Sport and Recreation, and appointed as a member of Cabinet.

Following the resignation of Mike Gallacher in May 2014, Ayres gained the portfolio of Police and Emergency Services and lost the portfolio of Fair Trading. Following the 2015 state election, Ayres was sworn in as the Minister for Trade, Tourism and Major Events and the Minister for Sport on 2 April 2015 as a member of the second Baird government. In the first Berejiklian ministry, Ayres was appointed as the Minister for Western Sydney, the Minister for WestConnex, and the Minister for Sport, with effect from 30 January 2017. Following the 2019 state election, Ayres was sworn in as the Minister for Jobs, Investment, Tourism and Western Sydney in the second Berejiklian ministry, since 2 April 2019.

Upon Gladys Berejiklian's resignation on 1 October 2021, Ayres sought the Deputy Leadership of the Liberal Party on a ticket with Dominic Perrottet as the leader. On 5 October 2021, Ayres and Perrottet won the ticket, and were elected as the Deputy Leader and Leader of the New South Wales Liberal Party, respectively. On the same day, Ayres was sworn in as the Minister for Jobs, Investment, Tourism and Western Sydney and as the Minister for Trade and Industry. In a subsequent rearrangement of the Perrottet ministry, on 21 December 2021, Ayres was sworn in as the Minister for Enterprise, Investment and Trade, as the Minister for Tourism and Sport, and as the Minister for Western Sydney.

Ayres resigned from both Deputy Leader of the Liberal Party and his Ministerial positions on 3 August 2022 due to his involvement in the appointment of former Deputy Premier John Barilaro to a lucrative U.S. trade role. Ayres stood down as a cabinet member while he was being investigated over a potential breach of the ministerial code of conduct for an intervention he took with Investment NSW's chief executive Amy Brown to add an additional candidate to the shortlist for the position. He was succeeded by Matt Kean as Deputy Leader of the Liberal party at the party room meeting on 9 August.

He lost his seat in Parliament in the 2023 New South Wales state election. Ayres and Karen McKeown both polled 38.3% of the first preferences, after distribution of subsequent preferences McKeown won the seat with 51.6% of the vote to 48.4% for Ayres.

== See also ==
- O'Farrell ministry
- First Baird ministry
- Second Baird ministry
- First Berejiklian ministry
- Second Berejiklian ministry
- Perrottet ministry

New South Wales Legislative Assembly
Preceded by Karyn Paluzzano	Member for Penrith; 2010–2023	Succeeded by Karen McKeown
Political offices
Preceded by Himself as Parliamentary Secretary for Western Sydney	Minister Assisting the Premier on Western Sydney; 2013–2015	Succeeded by portfolio abolished
Preceded by Anthony Roberts	Minister for Fair Trading; 2013–2014	Succeeded by Matthew Mason-Cox
Preceded by Gabrielle Upton	Minister for Sport; 2014–2019	Succeeded by John Sidoti as Minister for Sport, Multiculturalism, Seniors and Veterans
Preceded by Gabrielle Upton	Minister for Recreation; 2014–2015	Succeeded by himself as Minister for Sport
Preceded by Mike Gallacher	Minister for Police and Emergency Services; 2014–2015	Succeeded by Troy Grant as Minister for Justice and Police
Preceded by Mike Gallacher	Minister for Police and Emergency Services; 2014–2015	Succeeded by David Elliott as Minister for Emergency Services
Preceded by Troy Grant as Minister for Trade and Investment as Minister for Tourism and Major Events	Minister for Trade, Tourism and Major Events; 2015–2017	Succeeded by Niall Blair as Minister for Trade and Industry
Preceded by Troy Grant as Minister for Trade and Investment as Minister for Tourism and Major Events	Minister for Trade, Tourism and Major Events; 2015–2017	Succeeded by Adam Marshall as Minister for Tourism and Major Events
Preceded by Mike Baird	Minister for Western Sydney; 2017–2022	Succeeded by David Elliott
New title	Minister for WestConnex; 2017–2019	Succeeded by Andrew Constance as Minister for Transport and Roads
Preceded by Adam Marshall as Minister for Tourism and Major Events	Minister for Tourism; 2019–2022	Succeeded by Ben Franklin
New title	Minister for Investment; 2019–2022	Succeeded by Alister Henskens as Minister for Enterprise, Investment and Trade
New title	Minister for Jobs; 2019–2021	Title discontinued
Preceded by John Barilaro	Minister for Trade; 2021–2022	Succeeded by Alister Henskens as Minister for Enterprise, Investment and Trade
Preceded by John Barilaro	Minister for Industry; 2021	Succeeded by Himself as Minister for Jobs, Investment, Tourism and Western Sydney
Preceded by Himself as Minister for Trade and Industry	Minister for Enterprise; 2021–2022	Succeeded by Alister Henskens as Minister for Enterprise, Investment and Trade
Preceded by Natalie Ward as Minister for Sport, Multiculturalism, Seniors and Veterans	Minister for Sport; 2021–2022	Succeeded by Alister Henskens
