= Karen McKeown =

Australian politician

Karen McKeown OAM MP
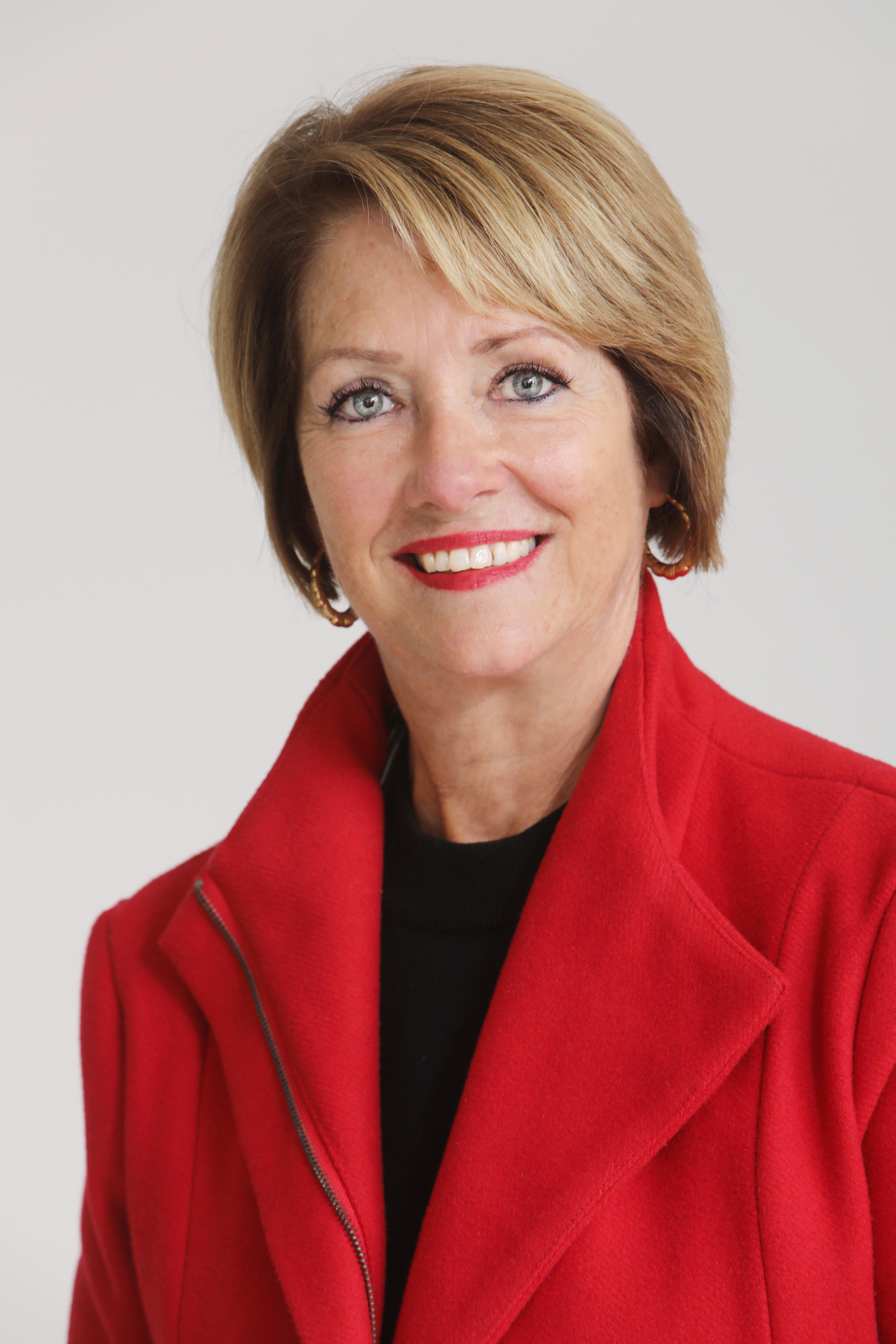

Member of the New South Wales Legislative Assembly for Penrith
- Incumbent
- Assumed office 25 March 2023
- Preceded by: Stuart Ayres

Mayor of Penrith
- In office 28 September 2020 – 13 January 2022
- Preceded by: Ross Fowler
- Succeeded by: Tricia Hitchen
- In office 21 September 2015 – 26 September 2016
- Preceded by: Ross Fowler
- Succeeded by: John Thain

Councillor of the Penrith City Council
- In office 2004–2024
- Succeeded by: Hollie McLean

Personal details
- Party: Australian Labor Party
- Occupation: Politician, unionist

Karen Anne McKeown is an Australian politician and a member of the New South Wales Legislative Assembly, representing the seat of Penrith for the Australian Labor Party. She was elected at the 2023 New South Wales state election, defeating former Liberal minister Stuart Ayres.

McKeown previously served on Penrith City Council from 2004 to 2024, including two terms as Mayor of Penrith and multiple terms as Deputy Mayor.

== Early life and education ==
McKeown was born and raised in Western Sydney. She completed a Bachelor of Commerce at Western Sydney University, with double sub-majors in law and employee relations. She holds a Labour Law Certificate from the University of Sydney, and an Executive Certificate for Elected Members from the University of Technology Sydney.

She is also a graduate of the Australian Institute of Company Directors and the Australian Institute of Superannuation Trustees.

== Career ==
Before entering Parliament, McKeown worked in the trade union movement, including with the Finance Sector Union, United Workers Union, and Public Service Association of NSW. She worked as a delegate, trainer, and industrial officer, often balancing part-time study, work, and parenting responsibilities.

She later taught in the TAFE system and worked in workplace advocacy.

== Local government ==
McKeown was first elected to Penrith City Council in 2004. She served two terms as Mayor of Penrith (2015–2016 and 2020–2022), and as Deputy Mayor (2006–2007 and 2019–2020).

During her time in local government, McKeown was:

- A founding member of the Multicultural Working Party and the Resilience Committee
- A member of the Local Traffic Committee and the Penrith CBD Corporation Board
- Vice President of the Australian Local Government Women’s Association (NSW)
- A director of both Local Government NSW and the Australian Local Government Association

== State politics ==
McKeown first contested the state seat of Penrith in 2019, but was narrowly defeated by then-Liberal MP Stuart Ayres. She was again preselected in 2023 and won the seat at the 2023 New South Wales state election.

In Parliament, she serves as:

- Deputy Chair, Committee on Children and Young People
- Member of the Committee on the Ombudsman, the Law Enforcement Conduct Commission, and the Crime Commission

She has used her role to advocate for domestic violence reform, superannuation equity, Indigenous recognition, and improved infrastructure and services in Western Sydney.

== Personal life ==
McKeown grew up in a working-class family in Western Sydney, raised by her mother and grandmother. She frequently references her upbringing and lived experience with housing insecurity, health challenges, and gender inequality in public speeches.

She is married to Brendan, a Northern Irish migrant, and they have children. McKeown’s father died in 2019 shortly after her first state campaign was launched.

== Honours ==
- Medal of the Order of Australia (OAM), awarded for service to local government and the community of Penrith.

== See also ==
- Members of the New South Wales Legislative Assembly, 2023–2027

New South Wales Legislative Assembly
Member for Penrith
Assumed office	25 March 2023
Preceded by	Stuart Ayres

Local offices
Mayor of Penrith
Term	2015–2016
Preceded by	Ross Fowler
Succeeded by	John Thain
Term	2020–2022
Preceded by	Ross Fowler
Succeeded by	Tricia Hitchen

Member of the City of Penrith Council for South Ward
In office	2004–2024
Succeeded by	Hollie McLean
