= Karyn Paluzzano =

Australian politician

Member of the New South Wales Legislative Assembly for Penrith
- In office 22 March 2003 – 7 May 2010
- Preceded by: Faye Lo Po'
- Succeeded by: Stuart Ayres

Parliamentary Secretary Assisting the Minister for Education and Training
- In office 23 September 2008 – 4 May 2010

Personal details
- Born: 6 May 1960 (age 66) New South Wales
- Party: Labor Party
- Spouse: Robert Paluzzano
- Children: 1 son, 2 daughters
- Education: University of Western Sydney
- Occupation: Radiographer

Karyn Lesley Paluzzano (born 6 May 1960) is an Australian former politician. She was a Labor Party Member of the New South Wales Legislative Assembly from 2003 to 2010, representing the electorate of Penrith. In September 2012, Paluzzano was sentenced to twelve months' home detention following a guilty plea for falsely claiming parliamentary allowances, as well as giving false and misleading evidence to an anti-corruption inquiry.

== Personal life ==
Paluzzano has lived in Penrith and Lower Blue Mountains for all her life. She was educated at Glenbrook and Lapstone Primary Schools and Nepean High School. Paluzzano was awarded a Master of Education by Nepean College of Advanced Education (now Western Sydney University), a Bachelor of Education and Diploma of Teaching (Distinction), and an Associate Diploma in Medical Radiography.

Paluzzano is married to Robert Paluzzano and with him has three children.

== Early career ==
Paluzzano was initially a radiographer and then became a teacher and university lecturer. During 1995 to 2002, Paluzzano was a visiting lecturer at the Australian Catholic University, University of Technology Sydney, and University of Western Sydney. Paluzzano has also worked as a Senior Education Officer Consultant and teacher at Werrington County Public School for the NSW Department of School Education. In 1999, Paluzzano was elected to Penrith City Council as a Councillor in the South Ward and remained a councilor until 2004.

== New South Wales state political career ==
Following the retirement of Faye Lo Po', Paluzzano won endorsement and then election for the seat of Penrith at the 2003 NSW state election, after being forced to preferences. Paluzzano was re-elected at the 2007 state election, again on preferences, with a slightly increased majority.

In 2008, Paluzzano was appointed Parliamentary Secretary Assisting the Minister for Education and Training by Premier Nathan Rees. She retained the post after Kristina Keneally succeeded Rees in 2009.

In December 2009, Timothy Horan, an Electorate Officer working for Paluzzano, alleged to the clerk of the Legislative Assembly that Paluzzano had illegally used public money to fund her re-election campaign. At first she denied the accusation at a preliminary Independent Commission Against Corruption (ICAC) hearing on 16 April 2010. At a subsequent ICAC hearing on 5 May, Paluzzano admitted to falsely signing employee pay forms and using her electoral mail allowance for political purposes.

On 4 May 2010, Paluzzano stepped down as Parliamentary Secretary for Education and Training. On 7 May, two days after Paluzzano admitted to rorting her electoral mail allowance and lying about it, Keneally directed Labor's state secretary to suspend Paluzzano's party membership. Paluzzano resigned from the legislature hours later. Her resignation came seven years and one day after her election to state parliament, making her eligible for a parliamentary pension. Her resignation triggered a by-election for her seat, which saw it resoundingly lost to Liberal candidate Stuart Ayres on a swing of over 25 per cent. At the time, it was the largest two-party swing against a sitting government in New South Wales history. The loss of Penrith proved to be a harbinger of NSW's massive defeat at the 2011 state election.

The commission, after completing its inquiry in July 2010, recommended that criminal changes be laid against Paluzzano. ICAC asked the Director of Public Prosecutions to consider charging Paluzzano over a range of offences, including misconduct in public office, obtaining money for one of her staff members, obtaining a "valuable thing" for herself and misleading corruption investigators.

On 7 June 2012, Paluzzano pleaded guilty to four charges relating to falsely claiming parliamentary payments between 2006 and 2007, as well as giving misleading evidence to the corruption watchdog during the 2010 inquiry. On 6 September 2012, Paluzzano was sentenced to a minimum of twelve months' home detention.

New South Wales Legislative Assembly
Preceded by Faye Lo Po'	Member for Penrith; 2003–2010	Succeeded by Stuart Ayres
