= Electoral district of Baulkham Hills =

State electoral district of New South Wales, Australia

Baulkham Hills New South Wales—Legislative Assembly
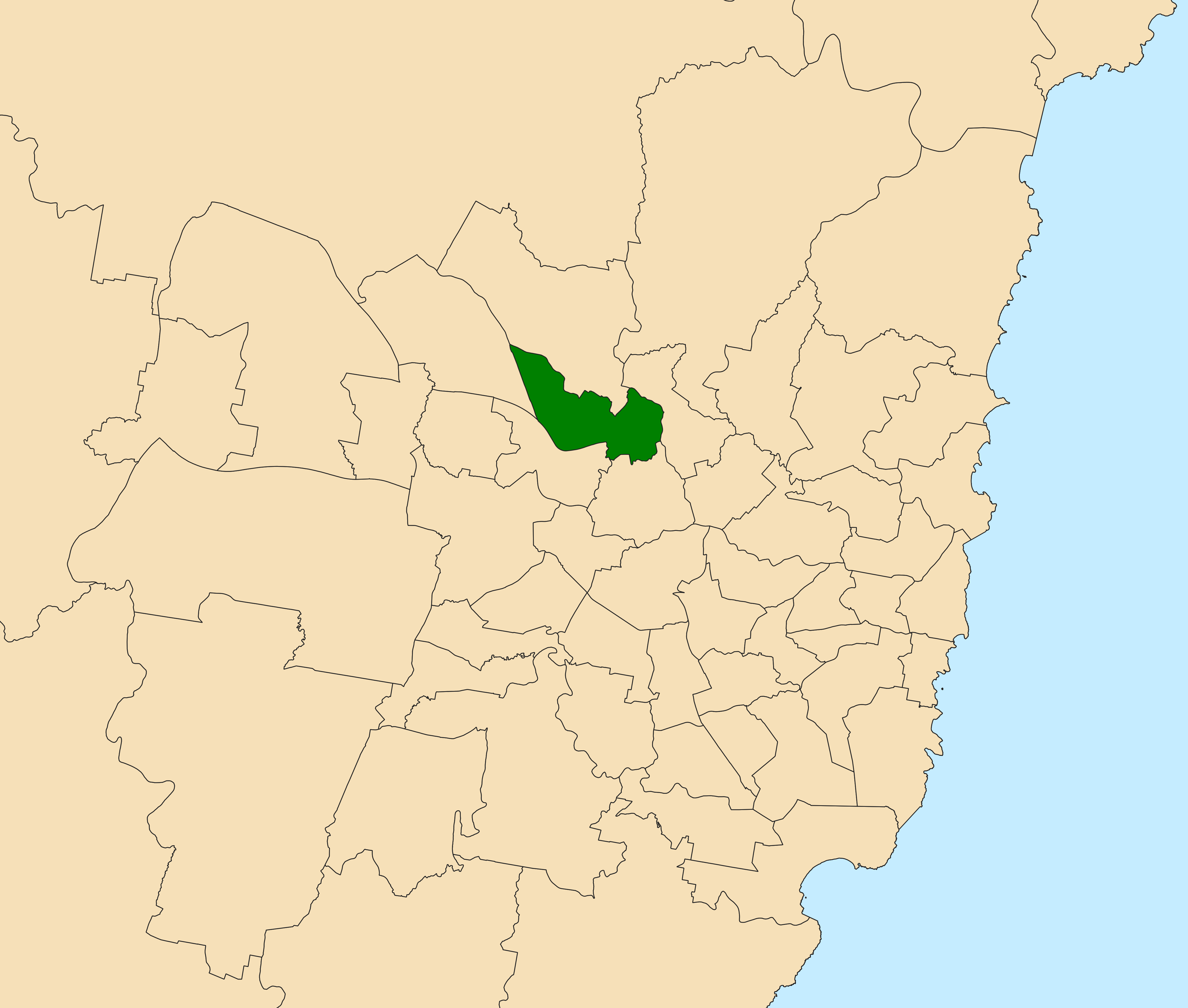
- Location within Sydney
- State: New South Wales
- Abolished: 2023
- Dates current: 1991–2023
- Namesake: Baulkham Hills, New South Wales
- Electors: 55,564 (2019)
- Area: 41 km^{2} (15.8 sq mi)
- Demographic: Outer metropolitan
Electorates around Baulkham Hills:
Riverstone	Castle Hill	Epping
Riverstone	Baulkham Hills	Epping
Seven Hills	Parramatta	Epping

Baulkham Hills was an electoral district of the Legislative Assembly in the Australian state of New South Wales. Its last member was David Elliott of the Liberal Party.

Baulkham Hills was a 41 km² electorate in Sydney's north-west, taking in the suburbs of Baulkham Hills, Bella Vista and parts of Carlingford, Castle Hill, Kellyville, North Rocks and West Pennant Hills.

The Baulkham Hills electorate was first created in 1991, replacing the short-lived electorate of Carlingford (1988–1991). As with its predecessor, it covers a series of wealthy and largely conservative suburbs. As a result of a redistribution in 2021, Baulkham Hills was abolished at the 2023 election; its territory split between Castle Hill, Epping and Kellyville.

== Members for Baulkham Hills ==
Member	Party	Period
Wayne Merton	Liberal	1991–2011
David Elliott	Liberal	2011–2023

== Election results ==
2019 New South Wales state election: Baulkham Hills
Party	Candidate	Votes	%	±%
Liberal	David Elliott	30,040	59.71	−4.82
Labor	Ryan Tracey	11,600	23.06	+0.89
Greens	Erica Hockley	3,937	7.83	−0.08
Christian Democrats	Craig Hall	1,868	3.71	+0.29
Animal Justice	Linda Newfield	1,485	2.95	+2.95
Sustainable Australia	Heather Boyd	1,380	2.74	+2.74
Total formal votes		50,310	97.48	+0.22
Informal votes		1,302	2.52	−0.22
Turnout		51,612	92.89	−0.92
Two-party-preferred result
Liberal	David Elliott	31,658	68.68	−3.11
Labor	Ryan Tracey	14,434	31.32	+3.11
Liberal hold		Swing	−3.11	
