= Guy Matheson =

Australian politician

Guy Kevin Vincent Matheson (born 20 September 1952) was an Australian politician and member of the New South Wales Legislative Assembly from 1988 until 1991. He was a member of the Liberal Party.

Matheson obtained a certificate in commercial accountancy at Penrith TAFE and worked in the Penrith branch of the National Australia Bank. He joined the Liberal party at age 18.

Prior to the 1988 election, Matheson won Liberal pre-selection for the seat of Penrith. The seat was considered unwinnable for the Liberal party and Matheson's campaign was low key and based on the slogan "Who is this Guy?". However the election was a landslide victory for the Liberal party and Matheson defeated the previous member Peter Anderson with a two party preferred swing of greater than 10%.

A very strong recovery in the ALP vote at the 1991 election resulted in Matheson losing this traditionally safe Labor seat to the ALP's Faye Lo Po' with a swing of more than 7%. Matheson has not nominated for public office since 1991.

New South Wales Legislative Assembly
Preceded by Peter Anderson	Member for Penrith; 1988–1991	Succeeded by Faye Lo Po'
