= Faye Lo Po' =

Australian politician

Faye Lo Po' AM (born 1 February 1936) is a former Australian politician, serving as member of the New South Wales Legislative Assembly for the electorate of Penrith between 1991 and 2003.

== Political career ==
A longtime member of the Labor Party, Lo Po' was heavily involved in local politics in the 1970s and 1980s, culminating in a term as mayor of the Penrith City Council in 1990–1991, before being elected to the NSW Parliament. While an MP, she held a number of portfolios, including Minister for Women, Community Services, Fair Trading, Consumer Affairs. While the ALP were in opposition from 1994 to 1995, she was Shadow Minister for Housing.

She was Alderman of Prospect Electricity from 1980 to 1987 and from 1991 to 1992, serving as chair. From 1986 to 1987, she was chair of the NSW Women's Advisory Council, a Member of the Metropolitan Waste Disposal Authority, chair of the NSW Board of Adult Education, and patron of various groups. She was appointed a Member of the Order of Australia (AM) in 1984.

Civic offices
Preceded by Brian King	Mayor of Penrith; 1990–1991	Succeeded by Tony Aquilina
New South Wales Legislative Assembly
Preceded by Guy Matheson	Member for Penrith; 1991–2003	Succeeded by Karyn Paluzzano
Political offices
Preceded by Wendy Machin	Minister for Consumer Affairs; 1995	Office abolished
New title	Minister for Fair Trading; 1995–1997	Succeeded by Brian Langton
Preceded by Kerry Chikarovski as Minister for the Status of Women	Minister for Women; 1995–2003	Succeeded by Sandra Nori
Preceded by Ron Dyer	Minister for Community Services; Minister for Ageing; Minister for Disability Services; 1997–2003	Succeeded by Carmel Tebbutt
