= Electoral district of Badgerys Creek =

State electoral district of New South Wales, Australia

Badgerys Creek New South Wales—Legislative Assembly
- Interactive map of district boundaries from the 2023 state election
- State: New South Wales
- Dates current: 1991–1999; 2023–present
- MP: Tanya Davies
- Party: Liberal Party
- Namesake: Badgerys Creek
- Electors: 60,267 (2023)
- Area: 396.01 km^{2} (152.9 sq mi)
Electorates around Badgerys Creek:
Penrith	Londonderry	Mount Druitt; Blacktown
Blue Mountains	Badgerys Creek	Prospect; Cabramatta
Wollondilly	Camden	Liverpool; Leppington

Badgerys Creek is an electoral district of the Legislative Assembly in the Australian state of New South Wales. It is located on the outskirts of Greater Western Sydney.

== History ==
Badgerys Creek was first established in 1991, replacing Minchinbury. It was abolished in 1999 and replaced by Mulgoa. A redistribution ahead of the 2023 election abolished Mulgoa and re-established Badgerys Creek. Based on the results of the 2019 election, it is estimated to have a notional margin of 9.7 percent for the Liberal Party.

== Geography ==
On its current boundaries, Badgerys Creek takes in the suburbs of Badgerys Creek, Bradfield, Bringelly, Cecil Park, Erskine Park, Glenmore Park, Greendale, Horsley Park, Luddenham, Mount Vernon, Mulgoa, Oran Park, Regentville, St Clair, Wallacia and parts of Catherine Field, Cobbitty, Kemps Creek and Orchard Hills.

== Members for Badgerys Creek ==
First incarnation (1991–1999)
Anne Cohen	Liberal	1991–1995
Diane Beamer	Labor	1995–1999
Second incarnation (2023–present)
Tanya Davies	Liberal	2023–present

== Election results ==
2023 New South Wales state election: Badgerys Creek
Party	Candidate	Votes	%	±%
Liberal	Tanya Davies	26,972	51.8	−2.3
Labor	Garion Thain	16,766	32.2	−2.2
One Nation	Benjamin Green	4,268	8.2	+5.8
Greens	Nick Best	2,751	5.3	+0.4
Sustainable Australia	Peter Cooper	1,321	2.5	−0.6
Total formal votes		52,078	96.2	+0.2
Informal votes		2,072	3.8	−0.2
Turnout		54,150	89.9	+1.3
Two-party-preferred result
Liberal	Tanya Davies	28,868	60.5	+0.7
Labor	Garion Thain	18,866	39.5	−0.7
Liberal hold		Swing	+0.7	
