= Electoral district of Penrith =

Penrith New South Wales—Legislative Assembly
- Interactive map of district boundaries from the 2023 state election
- State: New South Wales
- Dates current: 1973–present
- MP: Karen McKeown
- Party: Labor
- Namesake: Penrith
- Electors: 56,565 (2023)
- Area: 75.61 km^{2} (29.2 sq mi)
- Demographic: Outer-metropolitan
Electorates around Penrith:
Hawkesbury	Londonderry	Londonderry
Blue Mountains	Penrith	Londonderry
Blue Mountains	Badgerys Creek	Badgerys Creek

Penrith is an electoral district of the Legislative Assembly in the Australian state of New South Wales since 1973. It is represented by Karen McKeown of the Labor Party.

It has been traditionally a safe Labor seat for most of its history but has had times where it has fallen to the Liberal Party. It is now regarded as a key marginal seat.

== Geography ==
On its current boundaries, Penrith takes in the suburbs of Penrith, Emu Heights, Emu Plains, Jamisontown, Leonay, South Penrith, Cambridge Gardens, Werrington Downs and parts of Cambridge Park, Castlereagh, Cranebrook, and Kingswood.

== Members for Penrith ==
Member	Party	Term
Ron Mulock	Labor	1973–1981
Peter Anderson	Labor	1981–1988
Guy Matheson	Liberal	1988–1991
Faye Lo Po'	Labor	1991–2003
Karyn Paluzzano	Labor	2003–2010
Stuart Ayres	Liberal	2010–2023
Karen McKeown	Labor	2023–present

== Election results ==
2023 New South Wales state election: Penrith
Party	Candidate	Votes	%	±%
Liberal	Stuart Ayres	19,266	38.3	−1.4
Labor	Karen McKeown	19,262	38.3	+1.4
One Nation	Belinda McWilliams	4,122	8.2	+1.4
Greens	Minoo Toussi	2,643	5.2	+0.6
Legalise Cannabis	Timothy Pateman	2,467	4.9	+4.9
Animal Justice	Vanessa Blazi	1,840	3.7	+2.0
Sustainable Australia	Geoff Brown	744	1.5	−0.2
Total formal votes		50,344	96.1	+0.0
Informal votes		2,047	3.9	0.0
Turnout		52,391	87.8	−0.9
Two-party-preferred result
Labor	Karen McKeown	22,661	51.6	+2.2
Liberal	Stuart Ayres	21,226	48.4	−2.2
Labor gain from Liberal		Swing	+2.2	
