= Tanya Davies =

Member of the New South Wales Legislative Assembly

Tanya Davies MP

Member of the New South Wales Parliament for Badgerys Creek
- Incumbent
- Assumed office 25 March 2023
- Preceded by: New seat
- Majority: 11.3 points

Member of the New South Wales Parliament for Mulgoa
- In office 26 March 2011 – 25 March 2023
- Preceded by: Diane Beamer
- Succeeded by: Seat abolished
- Majority: 9.7 points

Minister for Mental Health
- In office 30 January 2017 – 23 March 2019
- Premier: Gladys Berejiklian
- Preceded by: Pru Goward
- Succeeded by: Bronnie Taylor (as Minister for Mental Health, Regional Youth and Women)

Minister for Women
- In office 30 January 2017 – 23 March 2019
- Premier: Gladys Berejiklian
- Preceded by: Pru Goward
- Succeeded by: Bronnie Taylor (as Minister for Mental Health, Regional Youth and Women)

Minister for Ageing
- In office 30 January 2017 – 23 March 2019
- Premier: Gladys Berejiklian
- Preceded by: John Ajaka
- Succeeded by: John Sidoti (as Minister for Sport, Multiculturalism, Seniors and Veterans)

Personal details
- Born: Newcastle, New South Wales
- Party: Liberal Party
- Occupation: Physiotherapist

Tanya Davies is an Australian politician who has served as a member of the New South Wales Legislative Assembly representing the Liberal Party since 2011. She is a member of the conservative faction of the Liberal Party.

Davies was the New South Wales Minister for Mental Health, the Minister for Women and the Minister for Ageing from January 2017 until March 2019 in the first Berejiklian government.

== Early years and background ==
Davies was born and raised in Newcastle and moved to Sydney aged 17, initially living with her grandparents at Regents Park for her university studies where she graduated with a degree in physiotherapy from the University of Sydney. Davies worked as a physiotherapist in the public health system before working in higher education institutions such as the University of Western Sydney and TAFE. Elected to Penrith City Council in 2008, Davies served on Council until 2012. Davies' husband, Mark Davies, also served on Penrith City Council and in 2012 was elected mayor of the City of Penrith. Davies has two children: the elder Laura and the younger Harry.

== Political career ==
In 2011 Davies contested the then Labor seat of Mulgoa in Sydney's western suburbs. She was elected with a swing of 23.2 points, winning the seat with 62 per cent of the two-party. Davies' Labor opponent was Prue Car, now Deputy Premier of NSW. Diane Beamer, who was the sitting Labor member, had retired from politics after holding the seat and its predecessor, Badgerys Creek, for 16 years.

In 2017 Davies was appointed the Minister for Mental Health, the Minister for Women and the Minister for Ageing in the Berejiklian government. In June 2018, Davies voted against a bill that would create 150-metre (490 ft) "safe access zones" outside abortion clinics. She is an opponent of legal abortion and was one of two Liberal Party members who threatened to leave the government if amendments were not made on a 2019 bill to decriminalise abortion.

Davies was re-elected at the 2019 state election, but was not reappointed to the Second Berejiklian ministry.

The 2020 redistribution undertaken for the 2023 New South Wales state election was finalised in 2021, where the district of Mulgoa was effectively renamed Badgerys Creek. While the Perrottet government was defeated at the election, Davies was comfortably elected to the new district.

=== Opposition to COVID-19 vaccine mandates ===
In January 2022 she spoke at a 'Prayer and pushback' forum moderated by a former Hillsong Church pastor and featuring anti-vax speakers, where, contrary to policies of state and federal government, she spoke against COVID-19 vaccinations for children.

Davies spoke again at an ‘anti-vaccination rally’ in March 2022, where among other things she criticised the Perrottet government’s handling of vaccine mandates and COVID-19 restrictions.

=== Mark Davies ===
Husband and Penrith City Councillor Mark Davies unsuccessfully nominated for preselection as the Liberal Party candidate for Lindsay in both 2022 and 2025.

== See also ==
- First Berejiklian ministry

New South Wales Legislative Assembly
Preceded by Diane Beamer	Member for Mulgoa; 2011 – 2023	Seat abolished
New seat	Member for Badgerys Creek; 2023 – present	Incumbent
Political offices
Preceded by Pru Goward	Minister for Mental Health; 2017–2019	Succeeded by Bronnie Taylor as Minister for Mental Health, Regional Youth and Women
Preceded by Pru Goward	Minister for Women; 2017–2019	Succeeded by Bronnie Taylor as Minister for Mental Health, Regional Youth and Women
Preceded by John Ajaka	Minister for Ageing; 2017–2019	Succeeded by John Sidoti as Minister for Sport, Multiculturalism, Seniors and Veterans
