= Diane Beamer =

Australian politician

The Honourable Diane Beamer

Minister for Fair Trading
- In office 3 August 2005 – 2 April 2007
- Premier: Morris Iemma
- Preceded by: John Hatzistergos
- Succeeded by: Linda Burney

Minister for Western Sydney
- In office 2 April 2003 – 2 April 2007
- Premier: Bob Carr; Morris Iemma
- Preceded by: Kim Yeadon
- Succeeded by: Graham West

Minister for Juvenile Justice
- In office 2 April 2003 – 3 August 2005
- Premier: Bob Carr
- Preceded by: Carmel Tebbutt
- Succeeded by: Tony Kelly

Member of the New South Wales Legislative Assembly for Mulgoa
- In office 5 March 1999 – 4 March 2011
- Preceded by: Tony Aquilina
- Succeeded by: Tanya Davies

Member of the New South Wales Legislative Assembly for Badgerys Creek
- In office 25 March 1995 – 5 March 1999
- Preceded by: Anne Cohen
- Succeeded by: District abolished

Personal details
- Born: 15 July 1960 (age 66) England
- Citizenship: Australian
- Party: Labor
- Spouse(s): Stephen Hutchins (previous marriage); David Humphries
- Children: 6
- Education: University of Sydney (BA)

Diane Beamer (born 15 July 1960) is an Australian politician. As an Australian Labor Party member of the New South Wales Legislative Assembly, she represented the state electorates of Badgerys Creek (1995–1999) and Mulgoa (1999–2011). This included ministerial roles in the Carr and Iemma governments. Beamer chose not to recontest the 2011 election. In December 2018, Labor endorsed Beamer as their candidate for the Division of Lindsay at the 2019 Australian federal election. She was defeated by the Liberals' Melissa McIntosh.

== Early life and education ==
Born in England, Beamer migrated with her parents to Australia in the early 1960s. During their first years in Sydney, the family lived in a Nissen hut at Cabramatta Migrant Hostel.

In 1975, Beamer joined the Emu Plains Branch of the Australian Labor Party. She later graduated from the University of Sydney with a Bachelor of Arts (BA). From 1985 to 1989, Beamer worked as an electorate officer for the Minister for Sport and Tourism John Brown.

=== Civic roles ===
Between 1989 and 1995, Beamer served as an elected councillor of the City of Penrith. This included 1992–93 as Deputy Mayor and 1993–94 as Mayor. She has also been a member of the Board of Ripples Aquatic Centre and a Parliamentary Patron of the Spokeswomen Program.

== New South Wales state politics (1995-2011) ==
In 1991, Beamer unsuccessfully contested the seat of Badgerys Creek, however was elected to it in 1995. Following Badgerys Creek's abolition in 1999, she was elected as Member for Mulgoa. In April 2003, Beamer became Minister Assisting the Minister for Infrastructure and Planning (Planning Administration), Juvenile Justice and Minister for Western Sydney. When Morris Iemma became Premier in August 2005, Beamer was appointed Minister for Fair Trading and Minister assisting the Minister for Commerce while continuing to be Minister for Western Sydney.

=== Orange Grove Affair ===
see also Orange Grove affair

On 16 June 2004, the Department of Infrastructure, Planning and Natural Resources, advised Beamer as Minister Assisting the Minister for Infrastructure and Planning (Planning Administration) to approve a variation of the Local Environment Plan (LEP) which would have retrospectively validated the planning approval for an Orange Grove shopping centre. On 8 July 2004, Beamer declined to approve the proposed variation on the grounds that the shopping centre tended to undermine the viability of the Liverpool shopping centre. The owners of the Orange Grove centre subsequently claimed that this decision was corrupt. This led to an investigation by the Independent Commission Against Corruption (ICAC), which made no findings of corruption against any person.

=== Retirement from state politics ===
After the 2007 election, Beamer served as a backbencher and chose not to recontest the 2011 election.

== Australian federal politics (2019) ==
In December 2018, the Australian Labor Party National Executive endorsed Beamer to take over from Emma Husar as the Labor candidate for the Division of Lindsay at the 2019 Australian federal election. The seat was won by the Liberals' Melissa McIntosh. Beamer's previous state electorates of Badgerys Creek and Mulgoa cover much of the same geographic area as the seat of Lindsay.

== Family and personal life ==
Beamer has six children. She was married to former Australian politician Stephen Hutchins, but is now married to Sydney journalist David Humphries.

Civic offices
Preceded by Bill Gayed	Mayor of Penrith; 1993–1994	Succeeded by Pat Sheehy
New South Wales Legislative Assembly
Preceded by Anne Cohen	Member for Badgerys Creek; 1995–1999	District abolished
Preceded by Tony Aquilina	Member for Mulgoa; 1999–2011	Succeeded by Tanya Davies
Political offices
New title	Minister Assisting the Minister for Infrastructure and Planning (Planning Administration); 2003–2005	Vacant Title next held by Barbara Perry as Minister Assisting the Minister for Planning
Preceded by Kim Yeadon	Minister for Western Sydney; 2003–2007	Succeeded by Graham West
Preceded by Carmel Tebbutt	Minister for Juvenile Justice; 2003–2005	Succeeded by Tony Kelly
Preceded by John Hatzistergos	Minister Assisting the Minister for Commerce; 2005–2007	Office abolished
Preceded by John Hatzistergos	Minister for Fair Trading; 2005–2007	Succeeded by Linda Burney
