= Wayne Merton =

Australian politician

Wayne Ashley Merton (born 18 October 1943), a former Australian politician, was a Member of the New South Wales Legislative Assembly representing the electorates of Carlingford between 1988 and 1991 and Baulkham Hills between 1991 and 2011 for the Liberal Party. He was Minister for Justice and Minister for Emergency Services from October 1992 to May 1993.

He is married with three children. His daughter Rachel was elected to the New South Wales Legislative Council at the 2023 New South Wales state election.

In March 2010, Merton announced his decision to retire and would not contest the 2011 election. After a heated preselection campaign, David Elliott was chosen as his successor for the safe seat of Baulkham Hills.

New South Wales Legislative Assembly
New district	Member for Carlingford; 1988 – 1991	District abolished
New district	Member for Baulkham Hills; 1991 – 2011	Succeeded by David Elliott
