= Anne Cohen =

Australian politician (1941–2026)

Anne Margaret Cohen (2 January 1941 – 10 May 2026) was an Australian politician. She was the Liberal member for Minchinbury and then Badgerys Creek from 1988 to 1995.

== Life and career ==
Cohen was born in Inverell, New South Wales on 2 January 1941. She was an editor and small business owner before entering politics. Married to Richard, she has two children. In 1988, she was selected as the Liberal candidate for the new notionally Labor seat of Minchinbury; she had a narrow win. In 1991 Minchinbury was replaced by Badgerys Creek, which Cohen also won. Shortly after that election she became Chief Secretary and Minister for Administrative Services. She was the last Chief Secretary of New South Wales, with the office being abolished in 1995. In 1995, she was very narrowly defeated by Labor candidate Diane Beamer.

Later in 1995 she attempted to return to the NSW Parliament via a vacancy in the Legislative Council caused by the resignation of Stephen Mutch but was defeated in the preselection by Mike Gallacher.

Cohen died on 10 May 2026, at the age of 85.

New South Wales Legislative Assembly
Preceded by New seat	Member for Minchinbury; 1988–1991	Succeeded by Abolished
Preceded by New seat	Member for Badgerys Creek; 1991–1995	Succeeded by Diane Beamer
