= Electoral results for the district of Albury =

Election results for Albury, New South Wales, Australia

Albury, an electoral district of the Legislative Assembly in the Australian state of New South Wales, was created in 1880. It was abolished in 1920 when multiple member constituencies were established using the Hare-Clark single transferable vote. It was re-created in 1927 when the state returned to single member electorates.

== Members ==
First incarnation (1880–1920)
Election	Member	Party
1880	George Day	None
1882	George Day	None
1885	George Day	None
1887	George Day	Protectionist
1889	John Wilkinson	Protectionist
1891	John Wilkinson	Protectionist
1894	John Wilkinson	Protectionist
1895	Richard Ball	Free Trade
1898	Thomas Griffith	Protectionist
1901	Thomas Griffith	Independent
1904	Gordon McLaurin	Progressive
1907	Gordon McLaurin	Independent
1913	John Cusack	Labor
1917	Arthur Manning	Nationalist
Second incarnation (1927–present)
Election	Member	Party
1927	John Ross	Nationalist
1930	Joseph Fitzgerald	Labor
1932	Alexander Mair	United Australia
1935	Alexander Mair	United Australia
1938	Alexander Mair	United Australia
1941	Alexander Mair	United Australia
1944	Alexander Mair	Democratic / Liberal
1946 by	John Hurley	Labor
1947	Doug Padman	Liberal
1950	Doug Padman	Liberal
1953	Doug Padman	Liberal
1956	Doug Padman	Liberal
1959	Doug Padman	Liberal
1962	Doug Padman	Liberal
1965	Gordon Mackie	Liberal
1968	Gordon Mackie	Liberal
1971	Gordon Mackie	Liberal
1973	Gordon Mackie	Liberal
1976	Gordon Mackie	Liberal
1978	Harold Mair	Labor
1981	Harold Mair	Labor
1984	Harold Mair	Labor
1988	Ian Glachan	Liberal
1991	Ian Glachan	Liberal
1995	Ian Glachan	Liberal
1999	Ian Glachan	Liberal
2003	Greg Aplin	Liberal
2007	Greg Aplin	Liberal
2011	Greg Aplin	Liberal
2015	Greg Aplin	Liberal
2019	Justin Clancy	Liberal
2023	Justin Clancy	Liberal

== Election results ==
=== 2023 ===
2023 New South Wales state election: Albury
Party	Candidate	Votes	%	±%
Liberal	Justin Clancy	26,368	53.0	−3.7
Labor	Marcus Rowland	11,081	22.3	−2.6
Greens	Eli Davern	4,672	9.4	+0.0
Shooters, Fishers, Farmers	Peter Sinclair	4,009	8.1	+8.1
Animal Justice	Asanki Fernando	1,263	2.5	+2.5
Liberal Democrats	Geoffrey Robertson	1,224	2.5	+2.5
Sustainable Australia	Ross Hamilton	1,171	2.4	−4.6
Total formal votes		49,788	96.5	+1.3
Informal votes		1,795	3.5	−1.3
Turnout		51,583	86.2	−0.1
Two-party-preferred result
Liberal	Justin Clancy	28,811	66.3	+0.5
Labor	Marcus Rowland	14,626	33.7	−0.5
Liberal hold		Swing	+0.5	

=== Elections in the 2010s ===
==== 2019 ====
2019 New South Wales state election: Albury
Party	Candidate	Votes	%	±%
Liberal	Justin Clancy	27,039	56.77	−1.06
Labor	Lauriston Muirhead	11,840	24.86	−6.83
Greens	Dean Moss	4,411	9.26	+3.64
Sustainable Australia	Ross Hamilton	3,335	7.00	+7.00
Keep Sydney Open	Reuben McNair	1,007	2.11	+2.11
Total formal votes		47,632	95.22	−1.28
Informal votes		2,393	4.78	+1.28
Turnout		50,025	86.84	−1.06
Two-party-preferred result
Liberal	Justin Clancy	28,258	65.98	+2.75
Labor	Lauriston Muirhead	14,572	34.02	−2.75
Liberal hold		Swing	+2.75	

==== 2015 ====
2015 New South Wales state election: Albury
Party	Candidate	Votes	%	±%
Liberal	Greg Aplin	26,800	57.8	−0.9
Labor	Ross Jackson	14,684	31.7	+16.4
Greens	Niloufer King	2,603	5.6	+0.6
Christian Democrats	Kym Wade	1,254	2.7	+0.2
No Land Tax	John Marra	1,006	2.2	+2.2
Total formal votes		46,347	96.5	+0.5
Informal votes		1,681	3.5	−0.5
Turnout		48,028	87.9	−1.0
Two-party-preferred result
Liberal	Greg Aplin	27,915	63.2	−13.9
Labor	Ross Jackson	16,233	36.8	+13.9
Liberal hold		Swing	−13.9	

==== 2011 ====
2011 New South Wales state election: Albury
Party	Candidate	Votes	%	±%
Liberal	Greg Aplin	26,316	61.1	−4.2
Labor	Darren Cameron	6,566	15.2	−12.1
Independent	Paul Wareham	6,276	14.6	+14.6
Greens	Colin Hesse	2,188	5.1	−2.2
Christian Democrats	Rhonda Avasalu	1,101	2.6	+2.6
Democrats	Stephen Bingle	617	1.4	+1.4
Total formal votes		43,064	96.3	−1.1
Informal votes		1,667	3.7	+1.1
Turnout		44,731	90.0	−0.4
Two-party-preferred result
Liberal	Greg Aplin	28,606	76.9	+7.9
Labor	Darren Cameron	8,609	23.1	−7.9
Liberal hold		Swing	+7.9	

=== Elections in the 2000s ===
==== 2007 ====
2007 New South Wales state election: Albury
Party	Candidate	Votes	%	±%
Liberal	Greg Aplin	27,643	65.3	+19.2
Labor	Chris Ryan	11,589	27.4	+13.9
Greens	Chris Sobey	3,077	7.3	+4.4
Total formal votes		42,309	97.4	−0.2
Informal votes		1,143	2.6	+0.2
Turnout		43,452	90.4	
Two-party-preferred result
Liberal	Greg Aplin	28,311	69.0	−3.4
Labor	Chris Ryan	12,731	31.0	+3.4
Liberal hold		Swing	−3.4	

==== 2003 ====
2003 New South Wales state election: Albury
Party	Candidate	Votes	%	±%
Liberal	Greg Aplin	16,826	44.0	+1.0
Independent	Claire Douglas	8,595	22.5	−12.4
Independent	Robert Ballard	5,267	13.8	+13.8
Labor	Nico Mathews	4,710	12.3	−5.3
Greens	Darran Stonehouse	1,092	2.9	+2.9
Independent	Heather Wilton	599	1.6	+1.6
Christian Democrats	Gail Schwartze	518	1.4	+1.4
One Nation	John Morgans	321	0.8	−3.7
AAFI	Sue Galley	305	0.8	+0.8
Total formal votes		38,233	97.5	−1.0
Informal votes		975	2.5	+1.0
Turnout		39,208	91.2	
Notional two-party-preferred count
Liberal	Greg Aplin	20,158	72.5	+7.7
Labor	Nico Mathews	7,656	27.5	−7.7
Two-candidate-preferred result
Liberal	Greg Aplin	19,275	61.5	+10.5
Independent	Claire Douglas	12,059	38.5	−10.5
Liberal hold		Swing	+10.5	

=== Elections in the 1990s ===
==== 1999 ====
1999 New South Wales state election: Albury
Party	Candidate	Votes	%	±%
Liberal	Ian Glachan	16,374	43.0	−6.9
Independent	Claire Douglas	13,272	34.9	+34.9
Labor	Mike O'Donnell	6,703	17.6	−9.9
One Nation	Michael Smith	1,731	4.5	+4.5
Total formal votes		38,080	98.5	+3.2
Informal votes		583	1.5	−3.2
Turnout		38,663	93.0	
Notional two-party-preferred count
Liberal	Ian Glachan	20,134	64.8	−2.5
Labor	Mike O'Donnell	10,934	35.2	+2.5
Two-candidate-preferred result
Liberal	Ian Glachan	17,913	51.0	−16.3
Independent	Claire Douglas	17,226	49.0	+49.0
Liberal hold		Swing	−16.3	

==== 1995 ====
1995 New South Wales state election: Albury
Party	Candidate	Votes	%	±%
Liberal	Ian Glachan	20,443	58.6	−3.1
Labor	Darren Cameron	9,748	27.9	−5.1
Independent	Amanda Strelec	2,628	7.5	+7.5
Greens	Jill Pattinson	1,184	3.4	+3.4
Democrats	Ian McKenzie	650	1.9	+1.9
Independent	Peter Boardman	248	0.7	+0.7
Total formal votes		34,901	96.0	+3.2
Informal votes		1,461	4.0	−3.2
Turnout		36,362	92.8	−0.3
Two-party-preferred result
Liberal	Ian Glachan	22,077	66.3	+1.0
Labor	Darren Cameron	11,214	33.7	−1.0
Liberal hold		Swing	+1.0	

==== 1991 ====
1991 New South Wales state election: Albury
Party	Candidate	Votes	%	±%
Liberal	Ian Glachan	19,759	61.6	+23.2
Labor	Peter Rowe	10,574	33.0	−1.6
Call to Australia	Fred Showler	954	3.0	+3.0
Citizens Electoral Council	John Kerr	764	2.4	+2.4
Total formal votes		32,051	92.8	−5.7
Informal votes		2,475	7.2	+5.7
Turnout		34,526	93.1	−0.8
Two-party-preferred result
Liberal	Ian Glachan	20,620	65.3	+3.6
Labor	Peter Rowe	10,955	34.7	−3.6
Liberal hold		Swing	+3.6	

=== Elections in the 1980s ===
==== 1988 ====
1988 New South Wales state election: Albury
Party	Candidate	Votes	%	±%
Liberal	Ian Glachan	11,930	38.4	−8.5
Labor	Harold Mair	10,716	34.5	−16.4
National	Mervyn McIntosh	8,438	27.1	+27.1
Total formal votes		31,084	98.6	−0.2
Informal votes		450	1.4	+0.2
Turnout		31,534	93.9	
Two-party-preferred result
Liberal	Ian Glachan	18,805	61.7	+13.7
Labor	Harold Mair	11,654	38.3	−13.7
Liberal gain from Labor		Swing	+13.7	

==== 1984 ====
1984 New South Wales state election: Albury
Party	Candidate	Votes	%	±%
Labor	Harold Mair	15,788	50.8	−4.5
Liberal	Ian Glachan	14,617	47.1	+2.4
Democrats	Christopher Rooke	665	2.1	+2.1
Total formal votes		31,070	98.8	+0.4
Informal votes		366	1.2	−0.4
Turnout		31,436	92.0	+1.9
Two-party-preferred result
Labor	Harold Mair		51.9	−3.4
Liberal	Ian Glachan		48.1	+3.4
Labor hold		Swing	−3.4	

==== 1981 ====
1981 New South Wales state election: Albury
Party	Candidate	Votes	%	±%
Labor	Harold Mair	15,850	55.3	+7.1
Liberal	Brian Moriarty	12,833	44.7	+5.5
Total formal votes		28,683	98.4	
Informal votes		466	1.6	
Turnout		29,149	90.1	
Labor hold		Swing	+7.6	

=== Elections in the 1970s ===
==== 1978 ====
1978 New South Wales state election: Albury
Party	Candidate	Votes	%	±%
Labor	Harold Mair	11,435	48.2	+6.3
Liberal	Phillip Williams	9,304	39.2	−19.0
National Country	Clifford Chamberlain	2,996	12.6	+12.6
Total formal votes		23,735	98.3	−0.1
Informal votes		411	1.7	+0.1
Turnout		24,146	91.6	−0.6
Two-party-preferred result
Labor	Harold Mair	12,024	50.7	+8.8
Liberal	Phillip Williams	11,711	49.3	−8.8
Labor gain from Liberal		Swing	+8.8	

==== 1976 ====
1976 New South Wales state election: Albury
Party	Candidate	Votes	%	±%
Liberal	Gordon Mackie	13,195	58.2	+1.5
Labor	Kevin Esler	9,498	41.8	+6.8
Total formal votes		22,693	98.4	+0.1
Informal votes		361	1.6	−0.1
Turnout		23,054	92.2	−0.7
Liberal hold		Swing	−6.2	

==== 1973 ====
1973 New South Wales state election: Albury
Party	Candidate	Votes	%	±%
Liberal	Gordon Mackie	11,948	56.7	+5.3
Labor	Gordon Mitchell	7,375	35.0	−2.8
Democratic Labor	Anthony Quinn	1,761	8.3	−2.5
Total formal votes		21,084	98.3	
Informal votes		361	1.7	
Turnout		21,445	92.9	
Two-party-preferred result
Liberal	Gordon Mackie	13,357	63.4	+3.4
Labor	Gordon Mitchell	7,727	36.6	−3.4
Liberal hold		Swing	+3.4	

==== 1971 ====
1971 New South Wales state election: Albury
Party	Candidate	Votes	%	±%
Liberal	Gordon Mackie	9,360	51.4	−6.9
Labor	Kevin Esler	6,881	37.8	+5.8
Democratic Labor	Anthony Quinn	1,965	10.8	+1.1
Total formal votes		18,206	98.4	
Informal votes		292	1.6	
Turnout		18,498	91.7	
Two-party-preferred result
Liberal	Gordon Mackie	10,932	60.0	−6.1
Labor	Kevin Esler	7,274	40.0	+6.1
Liberal hold		Swing	−6.1	

=== Elections in the 1960s ===
==== 1968 ====
1968 New South Wales state election: Albury
Party	Candidate	Votes	%	±%
Liberal	Gordon Mackie	11,537	58.3	+23.4
Labor	Douglas McFarlane	6,327	32.0	−6.1
Democratic Labor	Anthony Quinn	1,921	9.7	+4.6
Total formal votes		19,785	98.3	−0.5
Informal votes		344	1.7	+0.5
Turnout		20,129	93.3	−0.2
Two-party-preferred result
Liberal	Gordon Mackie	13,074	66.1	+7.3
Labor	Douglas McFarlane	6,711	33.9	−7.3
Liberal hold		Swing	+7.3	

==== 1965 ====
1965 New South Wales state election: Albury
Party	Candidate	Votes	%	±%
Labor	Robert White	7,754	38.1	−1.5
Liberal	Gordon Mackie	7,086	34.8	−18.3
Country	James Griffiths	4,463	22.0	+22.0
Democratic Labor	Leo Keane	1,030	5.1	+0.3
Total formal votes		20,333	98.8	−0.3
Informal votes		246	1.2	+0.3
Turnout		20,579	93.5	+0.3
Two-party-preferred result
Liberal	Gordon Mackie	11,960	58.8	+0.6
Labor	Robert White	8,373	41.2	−0.6
Liberal hold		Swing	+0.6	

==== 1962 ====
1962 New South Wales state election: Albury
Party	Candidate	Votes	%	±%
Liberal	Doug Padman	10,518	53.1	−5.1
Labor	Robert White	7,832	39.6	+7.8
Democratic Labor	Leo Keane	949	4.8	−5.2
Independent	Robert Garland	498	2.5	+2.5
Total formal votes		19,797	99.1	
Informal votes		188	0.9	
Turnout		19,985	93.2	
Two-party-preferred result
Liberal	Doug Padman	11,526	58.2	−6.0
Labor	Robert White	8,271	41.8	+6.0
Liberal hold		Swing	−6.0	

=== Elections in the 1950s ===
==== 1959 ====
1959 New South Wales state election: Albury
Party	Candidate	Votes	%	±%
Liberal	Doug Padman	11,672	58.2	
Labor	Reginald Garland	6,368	31.8	
Democratic Labor	Lawrence Esler	1,988	10.0	
Total formal votes		20,038	98.9	
Informal votes		232	1.1	
Turnout		20,270	92.7	
Two-party-preferred result
Liberal	Doug Padman	12,871	64.2	
Labor	Reginald Garland	7,167	35.8	
Liberal hold		Swing		

==== 1956 ====
1956 New South Wales state election: Albury
Party	Candidate	Votes	%	±%
Liberal	Doug Padman	11,205	58.4	+6.6
Labor	Robert White	7,988	41.6	−6.6
Total formal votes		19,193	99.1	+0.2
Informal votes		173	0.9	−0.2
Turnout		19,366	92.9	−1.0
Liberal hold		Swing	+6.6	

==== 1953 ====
1953 New South Wales state election: Albury
Party	Candidate	Votes	%	±%
Liberal	Doug Padman	9,644	51.8	
Labor	Frank Finnan	8,988	48.2	
Total formal votes		18,632	98.9	
Informal votes		208	1.1	
Turnout		18,840	93.9	
Liberal hold		Swing		

==== 1950 ====
1950 New South Wales state election: Albury
Party	Candidate	Votes	%	±%
Liberal	Doug Padman	9,894	55.3	
Labor	John Hurley	7,996	44.7	
Total formal votes		17,890	99.4	
Informal votes		111	0.6	
Turnout		18,001	93.5	
Liberal hold		Swing		

=== Elections in the 1940s ===
==== 1947 ====
1947 New South Wales state election: Albury
Party	Candidate	Votes	%	±%
Liberal	Doug Padman (Note: Jointly endorsed by the Liberal and Country parties.)	7,561	50.1	−3.0
Labor	John Hurley	7,533	49.9	+3.0
Total formal votes		15,094	99.1	+1.2
Informal votes		141	0.9	−1.2
Turnout		15,235	94.2	+4.3
Liberal hold		Swing	−3.0	

- John Hurley (Labor) won the seat at the 1946 by-election, but it was regained by the Doug Padman (Liberal).

==== 1946 by-election ====
1946 Albury by-election Saturday 9 November
Party	Candidate	Votes	%	±%
Labor	John Hurley	7,013	49.47	
Country	Alfred Townsend	3,823	26.97	
Liberal	Ernest Atkinson	3,339	23.56	
Total formal votes		14,175	85.38	
Informal votes		163	1.14	
Turnout		14,338	86.52	
Two-party-preferred result
Labor	John Hurley	7,518	53.04	
Country	Alfred Townsend	6,657	46.96	
Labor gain from Liberal		Swing		

Alexander Mair (Liberal) resigned to unsuccessfully contest a seat in the Australian Senate at the 1946 federal election.

==== 1944 ====
1944 New South Wales state election: Albury
Party	Candidate	Votes	%	±%
Democratic	Alexander Mair	7,139	53.1	+0.6
Labor	John King	6,316	46.9	−0.6
Total formal votes		13,455	97.9	−1.1
Informal votes		281	2.1	+1.1
Turnout		13,736	89.9	−1.8
Democratic hold		Swing	+0.6	

==== 1941 ====
1941 New South Wales state election: Albury
Party	Candidate	Votes	%	±%
United Australia	Alexander Mair	6,882	52.5	
Labor	John King	6,235	47.5	
Total formal votes		13,117	99.0	
Informal votes		132	1.0	
Turnout		13,249	91.7	
United Australia hold		Swing		

=== Elections in the 1930s ===
==== 1938 ====
1938 New South Wales state election: Albury
Party	Candidate	Votes	%	±%
United Australia	Alexander Mair	7,356	57.8	−1.2
Labor	Edward Jones	5,380	42.2	+1.2
Total formal votes		12,736	99.3	+0.9
Informal votes		91	0.7	−0.9
Turnout		12,827	95.7	+0.2
United Australia hold		Swing	−1.2	

==== 1935 ====
1935 New South Wales state election: Albury
Party	Candidate	Votes	%	±%
United Australia	Alexander Mair	7,086	59.0	+28.4
Labor (NSW)	Edward Jones	4,918	41.0	+0.9
Total formal votes		12,004	98.4	−0.7
Informal votes		192	1.6	+0.7
Turnout		12,196	95.5	−0.7
United Australia hold		Swing	+0.9	

==== 1932 ====
1932 New South Wales state election: Albury
Party	Candidate	Votes	%	±%
Labor (NSW)	Joseph Fitzgerald	4,803	40.1	+11.6
United Australia	Alexander Mair	3,674	30.6	+30.6
Country	John Ross	3,509	29.3	+29.3
Total formal votes		11,986	99.1	+1.1
Informal votes		112	0.9	−1.1
Turnout		12,098	96.2	+0.6
Two-party-preferred result
United Australia	Alexander Mair	6,964	58.1	
Labor (NSW)	Joseph Fitzgerald	5,022	41.9	
United Australia gain from Labor (NSW)		Swing	N/A	

==== 1930 ====
1930 New South Wales state election: Albury
Party	Candidate	Votes	%	±%
Labor	Joseph Fitzgerald	5,943	51.7	
Ind. Nationalist	John Ross (defeated)	5,461	47.5	
Communist	William Ford	96	0.8	
Total formal votes		11,500	98.0	
Informal votes		230	2.0	
Turnout		11,730	95.6	
Labor gain from Nationalist		Swing		

John Ross won the seat at the 1927 election as a Nationalist however he resigned from the party before the election, and contested the seat as an Independent Nationalist

=== Elections in the 1920s ===
==== 1927 ====
This section is an excerpt from 1927 New South Wales state election § Albury

1927 New South Wales state election: Albury
Party	Candidate	Votes	%	±%
Nationalist	John Ross	5,544	45.6	
Labor	James Hannan	4,786	39.4	
Independent Labor	Vern Goodin (defeated)	1,492	12.3	
Independent	George Daniel	263	2.2	
Independent	Charles Riley	65	0.5	
Total formal votes		12,150	98.8	
Informal votes		146	1.2	
Turnout		12,296	82.7	
Two-party-preferred result
Nationalist	John Ross	5,996	54.0	
Labor	James Hannan	5,105	46.0	
Nationalist win		(new seat)		

==== 1920–1927 ====
District abolished

=== Elections in the 1910s ===
==== 1917 ====
This section is an excerpt from 1917 New South Wales state election § Albury

1917 New South Wales state election: Albury
Party	Candidate	Votes	%	±%
Nationalist	Arthur Manning	3,395	50.0	+50.0
Labor	George Bodkin	2,385	35.1	−9.3
Independent Labor	John Cusack	1,011	14.9	+14.9
Total formal votes		6,791	98.6	+1.4
Informal votes		94	1.4	−1.4
Turnout		6,885	61.2	−8.7
Second round result
Nationalist	Arthur Manning	3,916	55.2	+55.2
Labor	George Bodkin	3,177	44.8	−7.8
Total formal votes		7,093	99.8	+1.2
Informal votes		13	0.2	−1.2
Turnout		7,106	63.1	+1.9
Nationalist gain from Labor		Swing		

The sitting member John Cusack was expelled from Labor in the November 1916 Labor split over conscription.

==== 1913 ====
This section is an excerpt from 1913 New South Wales state election § Albury

1913 New South Wales state election: Albury
Party	Candidate	Votes	%	±%
Labor	John Cusack	3,239	44.4	
Independent Liberal	Gordon McLaurin	2,116	29.0	
Farmers and Settlers	Hermann Paech (Note: Also endorsed by Liberal Reform.)	1,701	23.3	
Country Party Association	John McEachern	234	3.2	
Total formal votes		7,290	97.2	
Informal votes		211	2.8	
Turnout		7,501	69.9	
Second round result
Labor	John Cusack	3,970	52.6	
Independent Liberal	Gordon McLaurin	3,575	47.4	
Total formal votes		7,545	99.3	
Informal votes		53	0.7	
Turnout		7,598	70.8	
Labor gain from Independent Liberal				

==== 1910 ====
This section is an excerpt from 1910 New South Wales state election § Albury

1910 New South Wales state election: Albury
Party	Candidate	Votes	%	±%
Independent Liberal	Gordon McLaurin	2,786	55.5	−6.0
Labour	Benjamin Lloyd	2,234	44.5	+6.0
Total formal votes		5,020	98.4	+2.0
Informal votes		82	1.6	−2.0
Turnout		5,102	69.2	+8.4
Member changed to Independent Liberal from Progressive (defunct)		Swing	−6.0	

=== Elections in the 1900s ===
==== 1907 ====
This section is an excerpt from 1907 New South Wales state election § Albury

1907 New South Wales state election: Albury
Party	Candidate	Votes	%	±%
Former Progressive	Gordon McLaurin	2,452	61.5	
Labour	Henry Davies	1,533	38.5	
Total formal votes		3,985	96.4	
Informal votes		150	3.6	
Turnout		4,135	60.9	
Former Progressive hold				

==== 1904 ====
This section is an excerpt from 1904 New South Wales state election § Albury

1904 New South Wales state election: Albury
Party	Candidate	Votes	%	±%
Progressive	Gordon McLaurin	1,390	35.3	
Labour	Henry Davies	902	22.9	
Independent	Walter Billson	850	21.6	
Liberal Reform	Henry Ogilvie	799	20.3	
Total formal votes		3,941	98.9	
Informal votes		44	1.1	
Turnout		3,985	59.0	
Progressive gain from Independent				

Albury lost part of the district to Corowa and was expanded to include part of the abolished seat of The Hume. Thomas Griffith (Independent), the member for Albury, did not contest the election, while Gordon McLaurin (Progressive) was the member for The Hume.

==== 1901 ====
This section is an excerpt from 1901 New South Wales state election § Albury

1901 New South Wales state election: Albury
Party	Candidate	Votes	%	±%
Independent	Thomas Griffith	901	50.5	−0.7
Liberal Reform	Richard Ball	882	49.5	+0.7
Total formal votes		1,783	98.5	+0.3
Informal votes		27	1.5	−0.3
Turnout		1,810	75.4	+6.5
Member changed to Independent from Progressive				

=== Elections in the 1890s ===
==== 1898 ====
This section is an excerpt from 1898 New South Wales colonial election § Albury

1898 New South Wales colonial election: Albury
Party	Candidate	Votes	%	±%
National Federal	Thomas Griffith	834	51.2	
Free Trade	Richard Ball	795	48.8	
Total formal votes		1,629	98.3	
Informal votes		29	1.8	
Turnout		1,658	68.9	
National Federal gain from Free Trade				

==== 1895 ====
This section is an excerpt from 1895 New South Wales colonial election § Albury

1895 New South Wales colonial election: Albury
Party	Candidate	Votes	%	±%
Free Trade	Richard Ball	814	56.3	
Protectionist	George Billson	633	43.8	
Total formal votes		1,447	98.9	
Informal votes		16	1.1	
Turnout		1,463	73.3	
Free Trade gain from Protectionist				

==== 1894 ====
This section is an excerpt from 1894 New South Wales colonial election § Albury

1894 New South Wales colonial election: Albury
Party	Candidate	Votes	%	±%
Protectionist	John Wilkinson	842	51.9	
Free Trade	William Hall	782	48.2	
Total formal votes		1,624	99.1	
Informal votes		15	0.9	
Turnout		1,639	85.3	
Protectionist hold				

==== 1891 ====
This section is an excerpt from 1891 New South Wales colonial election § Albury

1891 New South Wales colonial election: Albury Friday 19 June
Party	Candidate	Votes	%	±%
Protectionist	John Wilkinson (elected)	670	63.0	
Free Trade	Luke Gulson	393	37.0	
Total formal votes		0	100.0	
Informal votes		1,063	0.0	
Turnout		17	1.6	
Protectionist hold				

=== Elections in the 1880s ===
==== 1889 ====
This section is an excerpt from 1889 New South Wales colonial election § Albury

1889 New South Wales colonial election: Albury Saturday 2 February
Party	Candidate	Votes	%	±%
Protectionist	John Wilkinson (elected)	472	51.5	
Protectionist	George Day	445	48.5	
Total formal votes		917	98.4	
Informal votes		15	1.6	
Turnout		932	65.1	
Protectionist hold				

==== 1887 ====
This section is an excerpt from 1887 New South Wales colonial election § Albury

1887 New South Wales colonial election: Albury Friday 11 February
Party	Candidate	Votes	%	±%
Protectionist	George Day (re-elected)	513	58.6	
Free Trade	William Smith	363	41.4	
Total formal votes		876	98.0	
Informal votes		18	2.0	
Turnout		894	61.8	

==== 1885 ====
This section is an excerpt from 1885 New South Wales colonial election § Albury

1885 New South Wales colonial election: Albury Friday 16 October
Candidate	Votes	%
George Day (re-elected)	501	61.2
Luke Gulson	318	38.8
Total formal votes	819	96.9
Informal votes	26	3.1
Turnout	845	63.9

==== 1882 ====
This section is an excerpt from 1882 New South Wales colonial election § Albury

1882 New South Wales colonial election: Albury Monday 4 December
Candidate	Votes	%
George Day (re-elected)	294	40.2
James Hayes	275	37.6
Luke Gulson	162	22.2
Total formal votes	731	97.9
Informal votes	16	2.1
Turnout	747	65.8

==== 1880 ====
This section is an excerpt from 1880 New South Wales colonial election § Albury

1880 New South Wales colonial election: Albury Saturday 20 November
Candidate	Votes	%
George Day (re-elected)	unopposed	
	(new seat)	

George Day was the sitting member for The Hume
