= William Cleaver Woods =

Doctor William Cleaver Woods M.B. Ch.M. M.D.
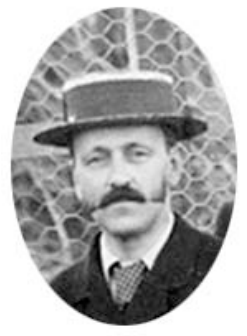

22nd Mayor of Albury
- In office 1894
- Preceded by: George H Billson
- Succeeded by: David S Watson
- In office 1911
- Preceded by: Alexander G Daniel
- Succeeded by: James Allen
- In office 1917–1918
- Preceded by: Percy D Burrows
- Succeeded by: Alfred Waugh

Alderman on Albury Council
- Incumbent
- Assumed office 1891
- In office 1908–1925

Personal details
- Born: 25 April 1852 West Derby, Lancashire, England, British Empire
- Died: 9 April 1943 (aged 90) Sydney, New South Wales, Australia
- Resting place: Albury New Cemetery
- Spouse: Margaret née Grieve
- Children: 11, including John
- Education: University of Melbourne (M.D.); University of Edinburgh (M.B., Ch.M, M.D.)
- Occupation: Physician, local councillor
- Known for: Pioneering the use of X-rays for cancer diagnosis and treatment

William Cleaver Woods, M.B., Ch.M. Edinburgh, M.D. (25 April 1852 – 9 April 1943) was a physician, politician and pioneer of Australian medical science, specialising in X-rays for diagnostic applications and cancer treatments.

== Life and times ==
In 1852, Woods was born in West Derby, Lancashire in England, the son of Richard Woods and Catherine née Cromwell. He was christened on 7 June 1852 in Liverpool, Lancashire, England. At the age of 10, the family moved to Melbourne in Australia and Woods grew up in Ballarat. Woods, a physician from Liverpool, England, married Margaret, née Grieve from New South Wales. The couple travelled to Europe aboard the R.M.S. Oceana for the honeymoon. The Woods had a large family with 9 sons and 2 daughters. The sons included Dr. L.S. Woods from Albury, Dr. John Grieve Woods, also known as the Flying Doctor of Broken Hill, Dr. R.G. Woods from Goulburn, G.C. Woods of Lockhart, and Norman Woods from Sydney. The daughters were Rice from Melbourne and Manning from Albury. Four other sons died prior to his death in 1943.

Woods died in 1943 at Sydney, New South Wales, Australia. He was buried at Albury New Cemetery, North Albury, New South Wales, Australia. Location: Latitude: -36.060649; Longitude: 146.927309.

== Education ==
He graduated from Melbourne University. In 1876, he returned to England and attended Edinburgh University and University of Edinburgh Medical School and graduated in 1882 with the degrees of Bachelor of Medicine and Master of Surgery and then the M.D. degree. On 7 September 1883, the Medical Board of Victoria met and accepted Woods’ diploma and registered, No. 1089, William Cleaver Woods, M.B. et Ch.M. Edinburgh, 1882 from Albury. On 15 September 1883, the Australian Medical Journal reported in the Local Subjects section that Dr. W.C. Woods had been appointed Health Officer at Wodonga, Victoria. In 1886, he was awarded a doctorate with the thesis on the association between dogs, sheep and hydatids. In 1901, Woods was awarded a doctorate from the University of Melbourne with an additional thesis on hydatids.

== Medical practice and X-ray pioneering ==
In 1888, Woods opened the Burnley Private Hospital at Albury, New South Wales and in 1903 established a medical office on Swift Street. In 1896, Woods became the first physician in Australia and among the first in the world to utilize x-rays to treat cancer of the larynx.

In 1901, Woods listed for sale a complete x-ray set with a guarantee to be in perfect order. The x-ray set included 3 tubes, a 5-inch coil from W. Watson and Son, a 12 cell bichromate battery and tube holder.

In 1901, Woods reported on Rontgen Rays for Cancer in the Medical Notes of the Australasian Medical Gazette. Woods referred to a cablegram that mentioned Professor Lahmann of the Medical College in Chicago, Illinois had successfully treated cancer with the Rontgen Rays. Woods remarked that his experience with this method of cancer treatment: "is far from encouraging. Three years ago he undertook a series of experiments with the rays on several cancer patients, but after an exhaustive trial he was compelled to admit that no apparent check was made in the progress of the cancerous growth".

== Political career ==
From 1891 to 1897, and then from 1908 to 1925 Woods served as alderman for the city of Albury. In 1894, he was elected mayor of Albury and then elected to the office of mayor again in 1917-18.
