= List of mayors of Albury =

Mayors of Albury, a city and local government area in the Riverina region of New South Wales, Australia.

== Mayors of Albury ==
=== Town of Albury ===
#	Portrait	Mayor	Term Start	Term End
1		James T Fallon	1859	1862
2		Walter M Miller	1862	1863
3		John Roper	1862	
4		Samual CV North	1864	1865
5		Samuel F Blackmore	1865	1866
5		Lewis Jones	1867	
7		George Henry Mott	1868	
8		George Day	1869	1870
9		Lewis Solomon	1871	
9		William NM Edmonson	1872	
(8)		George Day	1873	
10		Kenneth McLennan	1874	
11		James Day	1875	1876
12		William J Jones	1877	1878
13		Alfred H Emerson	1879	1880
14		George C Thorsold	1879	
(9)		William NM Edmonson	1880	
(13)		Alfred H Emerson	1881	
15		William E Lamport	1882	
(14)		George C Thorsold	1883	
16		Luke Gulson	1884	
17		George H Billson	1885	1886
18		Thomas H Griffth	1887	
19		Thomas H Mate	1888	
20		George A Thompson	1889	1890
21		Arthur Phillips	1892	
(17)		George H Billson	1893	
22		William Cleaver Woods	1894	
23		David S Watson	1895	1896
24		James Hodge	1897	
25		Conrad TenBrink	1898	
26		Walter J Billson	1899	1900
27		John C Chenery	1901	
(26)		Walter J Billson	1902	
28		Robert M Wilkinson	1903	1905
(25)		Conrad TenBrink	1906	
29		Alfred Waugh	1907	1908
30		Alexander G Daniel	1909	1910
(22)		William C Woods	1911	
31		James Allen	1912	
32		George P Frere	1913	
(29)		Alfred Waugh	1914	
33		Stuart M Logan	1915	
34		Percy D Burrows	1916	
(22)		William Cleaver Woods	1917	1918
(29)		Alfred Waugh	1919	1920
35		Jame P Smithenbecker	1921	
(29)		Alfred Waugh	1922	
36		Clive H Burt	1923	1924
37		Henry G Davies	1925	
(29)		Alfred Waugh	1926	1938
38		Dudley G Padman	1939–1945	
39		Cleaver E Bunton	1945	

=== City of Albury ===
Albury was proclaimed a city in 1946.

#	Portrait	Mayor	Term start	Term end	Term length	Ref
(39)		Cleaver E Bunton	1946	1960		
40		John C King	1961	1961		
(39)		Cleaver E Bunton	1961	1972		
41		Tom E Pearsall	1973	1974		
(39)		Cleaver E Bunton	1974	1976		
42		Max R Barry	1976	1976		
43		Harold D Mair	1976	1977		
44		John L Roach	1977	1989		
45		Leslie C Langford	1989	1992		
46		Arch J McLeish	1992	1994		
47		James G Paterson	1994	1994		
(45)		Leslie C Langford	1995	1995		
48		Amanda Duncan-Strelic	1995	1995		
49		Patricia G Gould	1996	1999		
50		Mel Read	2000	2000		
(49)		Patricia G Gould	2001	2004		
51		Arthur Frauenfelder	2004	2006		
(48)		Amanda Duncan-Strelic	2006	2007		
52		Stuart Baker	2007	2008		
(49)		Patricia G Gould	2008	2009		
53		Alice Glachan	28 September 2009	23 September 2013	3 years, 11 months and 26 days	
54		Kevin Mack	23 September 2013	2015		
55		Henk van de Ven	2015	2016		
(54)		Kevin Mack	2016	2022		
56		Kylie King	10 January 2022	14 October 2024	2 years, 9 months and 4 days	
(54)		Kevin Mack	14 October 2024	28 September 2026	1 year, 11 months and 14 days	
(56)		Kylie King	28 September 2026	Incumbent	0 months	
