= Arthur Affleck =

Australian aviator (1903–1966)

- Born: Arthur Herbert Affleck; 3 July 1903; Brighton, Victoria, Australia
- Died: 11 September 1966 (aged 63); Vancouver, Canada
- Aviation career
- Flight license: 1925
- Air force: Royal Australian Air Force

Arthur Herbert Affleck (3 July 1903 – 11 September 1966) was a Qantas pilot who was the first pilot of the Royal Flying Doctor Service of Australia in 1928.

Affleck was born at Brighton, Victoria on 3 July 1903. He worked in a bank for two years and joined the Royal Australian Air Force (RAAF) in 1923, with the wish to become trained as a commercial pilot. After six months as a clerk with the RAAF he was selected for training as a Civil Aviation Cadet. In 1925, having received his pilot's wings, he left the RAAF and joined Australian Aerial Services Ltd. In 1927 he joined Qantas. On 17 May 1928 he flew the surgeon Dr Kenyon Welch from Cloncurry, Queensland to Julia Creek, Queensland in a de Havilland DH.50. This was the first flight of the Royal Flying Doctor Service. In 1936 Affleck became a Flying Inspector with the Civil Aviation branch of the Defence Department. In 1959 he became regional director of civil aviation for Papua New Guinea.

In 1963, aged 60, he retired, moved to Sydney and published his autobiography The Wandering Years. On 11 September 1966 he died while on a cruise on the Orsova off the coast of Vancouver.

== See also ==
- Clyde Fenton – the first physician–pilot for the Royal Flying Doctor Service of Australia in the Northern Territory
