= John Grieve Woods =

Australian general practitioner (1900–1980)

John Grieve Woods (17 January 1900 in Albury, New South Wales – 27 April 1980 in Newcastle) was an Australian general practitioner and soldier. He was the son of Dr. William Cleaver Woods, a pioneer of Australian radiology and x-rays. He was nicknamed "The Flying Doctor" for his years of service in the Royal Flying Doctor Service of Australia.

== See also ==
- John Flynn (minister)
