= Electoral district of Albury =

State electoral district of New South Wales, Australia

Albury New South Wales—Legislative Assembly
- Interactive map of district boundaries since the 2023 state election
- State: New South Wales
- Dates current: 1880–1920, 1927–present
- MP: Justin Clancy
- Party: Liberal
- Namesake: Albury, New South Wales
- Electors: 59,834 (2023)
- Area: 16,286.87 km^{2} (6,288.4 sq mi)
- Demographic: Provincial and rural
Electorates around Albury:
Murray	Wagga Wagga; Cootamundra	Monaro
Murray	Albury	Monaro
Victoria	Victoria	Monaro

Albury is an electoral district of the Legislative Assembly of the Australian state of New South Wales. The member for Albury has been Justin Clancy of the Liberal Party since 2019.

Albury is a regional electorate in the state's south, on the border with Victoria. It encompasses the local government areas of the City of Albury, Greater Hume Shire, Federation Council, part of Snowy Valleys Council that includes the town of Cabramurra. Its significant population centres include Albury, Culcairn, Jindera, Corowa, Howlong, Holbrook and Tumbarumba.

== History ==
Albury was first created in 1880 from part of Hume and is named after the city of Albury. In 1920, Albury, Wagga Wagga and Corowa were absorbed into Murray, and four members were elected under proportional representation. At the end of proportional representation in 1927, Albury was recreated.

Albury has generally been considered as a heartland seat for the Liberal Party and its predecessors. While Labor has occasionally managed to break the conservative hold on the seat, these have typically occurred only at the peak of a popular government. For instance, former Albury mayor Harold Mair won the seat for Labor in 1978 and held it for a decade–only the second Labor member ever to win it in its present incarnation, and the only one to hold it for more than one term. However, Mair's name recognition in the area was not enough to keep him from being swept out in the landslide Labor defeat of 1988. Liberal Ian Glachan, who had been Mair's opponent in 1984, with the seat becoming a safe Liberal seat again.

Since then, Labor has never come close to retaking the seat. Labor candidates are usually fortunate to get much more than 30 percent of the primary vote. The Liberal hold on the seat has only been seriously threatened once since then. In 1999, Glachan suffered a 16-point swing and bested independent Claire Douglas by only 687 votes. At that election, Labor was pushed into third place. However, Glachan would have easily retained the seat with a 15 percent majority in a "traditional" two-party contest with Labor. The seat reverted to form in 2003 upon Glachan's retirement. His successor, Greg Aplin, won 61.5 percent of the two-party vote, and Labor was pushed to fourth place on the primary vote behind Aplin and two independents. Aplin held the seat without serious difficulty until 2019, when he was succeeded by fellow Liberal Justin Clancy.

== Members ==
First incarnation (1880–1920)
Member	Party	Term
George Day	None	1880–1887
George Day	Protectionist	18871889
John Wilkinson	Protectionist	1889–1895
Richard Ball	Free Trade	1895–1898
Thomas Griffith	Protectionist	1898–1901
Thomas Griffith	Independent	1901–1904
Gordon McLaurin	Progressive	1904–1907
Gordon McLaurin	Independent	1907–1913
John Cusack	Labor	1913–1917
John Cusack	Independent Labor	1917–1917
Arthur Manning	Nationalist	1917–1920
Second incarnation (1927—present)
Member	Party	Term
John Ross	Nationalist	1927–1930
John Ross	Independent	1930–1930
Joseph Fitzgerald	Labor	1930–1932
Alexander Mair	United Australia	1932–1943
Alexander Mair	Democratic	1943–1945
Alexander Mair	Liberal	1945–1946
John Hurley	Labor	1946–1947
Doug Padman	Liberal	1947–1965
Gordon Mackie	Liberal	1965–1978
Harold Mair	Labor	1978–1988
Ian Glachan	Liberal	1988–2003
Greg Aplin	Liberal	2003–2019
Justin Clancy	Liberal	2019–present

== Election results ==
2023 New South Wales state election: Albury
Party	Candidate	Votes	%	±%
Liberal	Justin Clancy	26,368	53.0	−3.7
Labor	Marcus Rowland	11,081	22.3	−2.6
Greens	Eli Davern	4,672	9.4	+0.0
Shooters, Fishers, Farmers	Peter Sinclair	4,009	8.1	+8.1
Animal Justice	Asanki Fernando	1,263	2.5	+2.5
Liberal Democrats	Geoffrey Robertson	1,224	2.5	+2.5
Sustainable Australia	Ross Hamilton	1,171	2.4	−4.6
Total formal votes		49,788	96.5	+1.3
Informal votes		1,795	3.5	−1.3
Turnout		51,583	86.2	−0.1
Two-party-preferred result
Liberal	Justin Clancy	28,811	66.3	+0.5
Labor	Marcus Rowland	14,626	33.7	−0.5
Liberal hold		Swing	+0.5	
