= Greg Aplin =

Australian politician (born 1952)

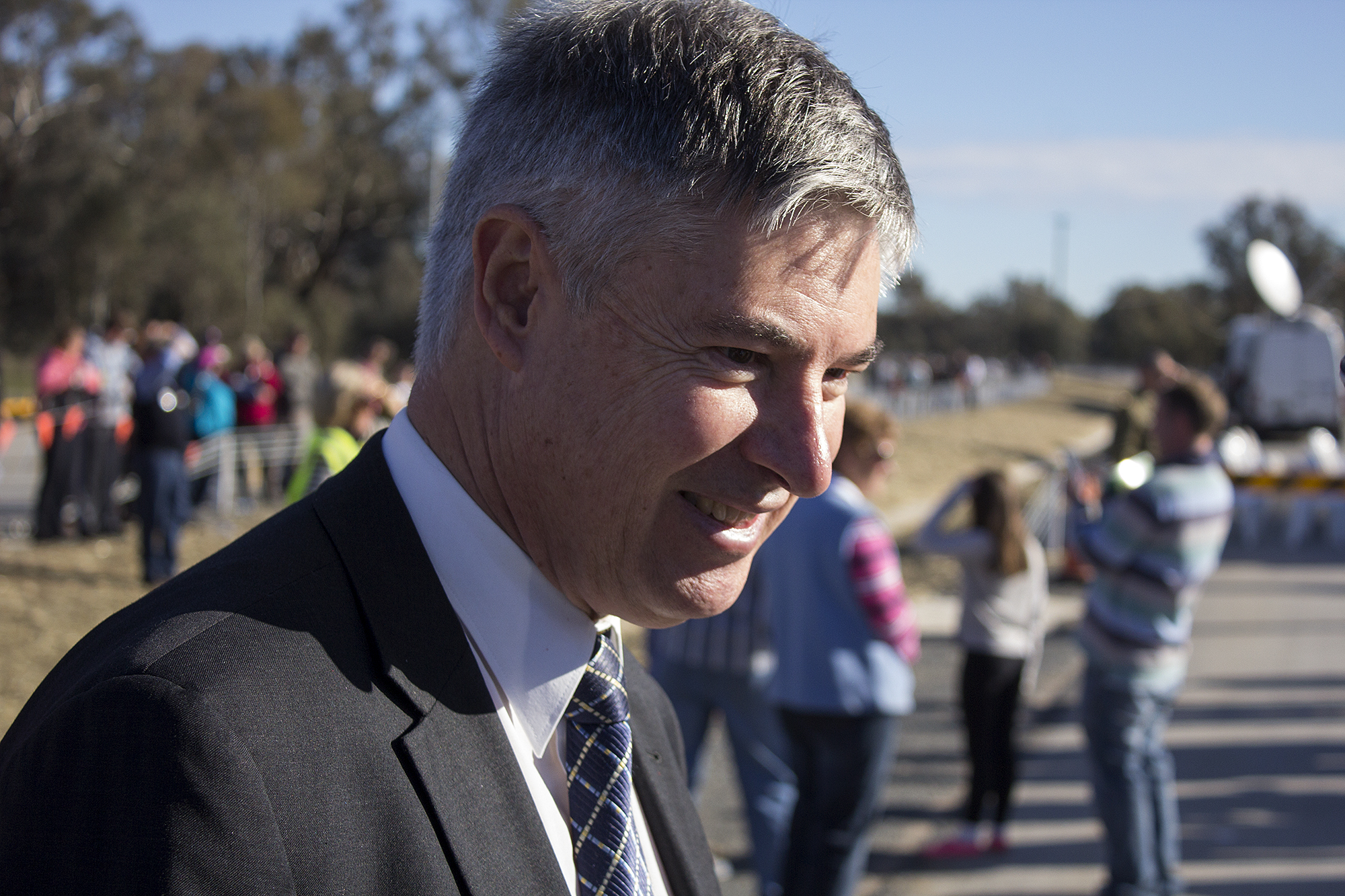
- Aplin at the Holbrook bypass open day

Member of the New South Wales Parliament for Albury
- In office 22 March 2003 – 23 March 2019
- Preceded by: Ian Glachan
- Succeeded by: Justin Clancy

Personal details
- Born: 9 October 1952 (age 73) Northern Rhodesia
- Party: Liberal Party
- Spouse: Jill Aplin
- Education: University of Cape Town (BA Hons)
- Profession: Administration manager
- Awards: General Service Medal

Military service
- Allegiance: Rhodesia
- Branch/service: British South Africa Police
- Years of service: 1975–77
- Battles/wars: Rhodesian Bush War

Gregory John Aplin (born 9 October 1952), an Australian politician, was a member of the New South Wales Legislative Assembly representing Albury for the Liberal Party from 2003 until 2019.

== Early life and background ==
Aplin was born in Northern Rhodesia, now Zambia, on 9 October 1952. He studied at the University of Cape Town, graduating with a Bachelor of Arts with Honours. He worked for the Rhodesian Ministry of Foreign Affairs, before doing national service with the British South Africa Police between 1975 and 1977, during which time he was awarded the General Service Medal. He returned to the Ministry of Foreign Affairs and was given a three years posting to Sydney. Aplin was acting Director of the Rhodesia Information Service in Sydney when it was closed by the new Mugabe government in May 1980. In 1980 he then returned to the newly independent Zimbabwe to work for the government in regional development, and arranging state visits.

Greg Aplin has been married to his wife Jill since 1975 and together they have four children. Aplin is a Rotarian and has been awarded a Paul Harris Fellowship, given to members who donate US$1,000 to Rotary International.

== Television ==
Aplin moved to Australia in 1981 and began working in television. He worked in Wollongong, Orange, and Albury, where he became station manager of Prime Television AMV-4, a post he held for 13 years. He won a Logie Award as the Executive Producer of a television programme. In 2001, when Australia's regional television stations were centralising, he became the administration manager for the University of New South Wales School of Rural Health in Albury and Wagga Wagga. A year later he became a researcher and media adviser for Member for Farrer, Sussan Ley.

== Political career ==
When Ian Glachan announced his retirement, Aplin was preselected as the Liberal Party's candidate for the seat in the 2003 state election. He received more than 16,826 first preference votes, out polling the nearest candidate, Albury City Councillor and Independent candidate, Clare Douglas, who received 8,595 first preference votes. Another two Albury City councillors polled third and fourth, with Olympian Rob Ballard receiving 5,267 votes, and Labor Party candidate Nico Matthews receiving 4,710 votes.

Aplin was appointed to the Standing Committee on Natural Resource Management in Public Affairs Committee two months after his election to the Parliament, and is the parliamentary ambassador for Keep Australia Beautiful. He was appointed to the Public Accounts Committee in October 2005. In March 2006, Peter Debnam (who was Opposition leader at the time) promoted Aplin to the Opposition front bench as the Shadow Minister for Housing. Aplin was re-elected at the 2007 and 2011 general elections. Prior to the 2011 general election, Aplin held the shadow portfolio of Mental Health and Aboriginal Affairs under Opposition Leader Barry O'Farrell. However, Aplin was not selected to join the O'Farrell ministry, and remained on the backbench under Premiers Mike Baird and Gladys Berejiklian. He retired at the 2019 election.

New South Wales Legislative Assembly
Preceded by Ian Glachan	Member for Albury; 2003–2019	Succeeded by Justin Clancy
