= Ian Glachan =

Australian politician

Ian Doric Glachan OAM (15 September 1934 – 20 April 2005) was an Australian politician. He was a Liberal Party member of the New South Wales Legislative Assembly from 1988 to 2003, representing the electorate Albury. He was subsequently elected Mayor of the Greater Hume Shire in 2005, but died suddenly the next month.

== Early career ==
Glachan attended Sydney Boys High School, graduating in 1947. He worked as a marine engineer, farmer, and businessman, as well as serving in the Royal Australian Air Force and as an officer in the Australian Merchant Navy.

== Political career ==
In 1984 he stood as the Liberal candidate for Albury, but was defeated by sitting member Harold Mair of the Labor Party. Glachan stood again in the 1988 election and won handily amid Labor's collapse in the more rural portions of the state that year. He actually won enough of a swing to turn Albury into a safe Liberal seat in one stroke, largely due to the Nationals' preferences flowing overwhelmingly to him. Glachan became chairman of the Parliament's Public Accounts Committee, and served as member for Albury until 2003 when he was succeeded by Greg Aplin. In March 2005 he was elected to the newly created Greater Hume Shire Council, and became its first mayor at the inaugural meeting on 16 March 2005.

== Other work ==
Ian Glachan was actively involved in the restoration of his local church building the Anglican Church at Jindera. He was the founding secretary of a committee that established the Trinity Anglican College and a wing at the Thurgoona campus was named after him. Glachan was presented with Rotary International's Paul Harris Fellowship, given to members who donate $1000 US. He served as a Justice of the Peace and as chairman of the Albury's Mercy Hospital building appeal.

Glachan received the Centenary Medal on 1 January 2001 for "service to the parliament and electorate as State Member for Albury". He was awarded the Medal of the Order of Australia (OAM) in the 2006 Australia Day Honours for "service to the Parliament of New South Wales, and to the community of the Albury region through a range of local organisations".

== Personal life ==
Ian Glachan was married to Helen, now a member of the New South Wales State executive of the Liberal Party of Australia. They had three daughters Jane, Alice, Ann. Alice Glachan is the former Mayor of the City of Albury. He died suddenly on 20 April 2005. His funeral was held at St Matthew's Anglican Church, Albury, and was attended by then state Liberal leader John Brogden.

New South Wales Legislative Assembly
Preceded by Harold Mair	Member for Albury; 1988–2003	Succeeded by Greg Aplin
Political offices
Preceded by New Creation	Mayor of Greater Hume Shire; 2005	Succeeded by John Ross
