= John Wilkinson (Australian politician) =

Australian politician

John Wilkinson (1854-1941) was an Australian politician, elected from 1889 to 1895 as a member of the New South Wales Legislative Assembly, for the electoral district of Albury.

Wilkinson was born on the Isle of Sheppey, Kent, England and arrived in Sydney as a boy in a ship of which father was a doctor. His father practised in Bathurst, Lambing Flat, Albury and Sale where he died in 1865. His family returned to Albury and he attended school there. He was articled to Joseph Dwyer and admitted as a solicitor in New South Wales and Victoria in 1881. He practiced as a solicitor in Sydney and then practised in Albury. Wilkinson was mayor of Albury in 1896. He was the member for Albury from 1889 to 1895.

== Notes ==
New South Wales Legislative Assembly
Preceded by George Day	Member for Albury; 1889 – 1895	Succeeded by Richard Ball
