= 1946 Albury state by-election =

Election result for Albury, New South Wales, Australia

A by-election was held for the New South Wales Legislative Assembly seat of Albury on Saturday 9 November 1946.

It was triggered by the resignation of the former Premier of New South Wales and second Leader of the New South Wales Liberal Party, Alexander Mair, in order to run for a seat in the Australian Senate.

The seat was subsequently won by John Hurley of the Labor Party. The Liberals witnessed a drop in their primary vote due to the Country Party fielding a candidate and splitting the conservative vote.

== Background ==
The seat of Albury, a traditionally safe Liberal seat, was held since 1932 by Alexander Mair, who after serving as a cabinet minister rose to become Premier of the state from 1939 to 1941. Following the electoral defeat in 1941, Mair played a central role in the negotiations to merge the conservative parties to form Robert Menzies' newly created Liberal Party of Australia, becoming a delegate for the Canberra Conference in October 1944 and hosting the second party conference in his seat in Albury at Mate's Department Store. Despite initial efforts to merge the Democratic Party with the Liberal Democratic Party becoming deadlocked over questions of party organisation and by acrimony between Weaver and the LDP leader, Ernest K White, they were ultimately successful and the Liberal party was born in early 1945. Serving on the Liberals' New South Wales executive from 1945 to 1946, when first party leader Weaver died suddenly on 12 November 1945, Mair was chosen to succeed him.

He served as the second Leader of the New South Wales Liberal Party only briefly until he resigned as leader on 21 March 1946, being succeeded by his former Minister for Justice, Vernon Treatt. On 14 August 1946, after serving fourteen years in the New South Wales Parliament, Mair resigned his seat to run for a seat in the Australian Senate. At the 1946 federal election held on 28 September, Mair was unsuccessful with the Labor Party winning all three NSW seats.

== Results ==
1946 Albury by-election Saturday 9 November
Party	Candidate	Votes	%	±%
Labor	John Hurley	7,013	49.47	
Country	Alfred Townsend	3,823	26.97	
Liberal	Ernest Atkinson	3,339	23.56	
Total formal votes		14,175	85.38	
Informal votes		163	1.14	
Turnout		14,338	86.52	
Two-party-preferred result
Labor	John Hurley	7,518	53.04	
Country	Alfred Townsend	6,657	46.96	
Labor gain from Liberal		Swing		

The Liberal candidate, Ernest Atkinson, was excluded on the first count. The Labor candidate John Hurley picked up 15% of the Liberal preferences which was enough to defeat the Country Party candidate, Alfred Townsend.
