= Justin Clancy =

Australian politician

Justin Clancy MP
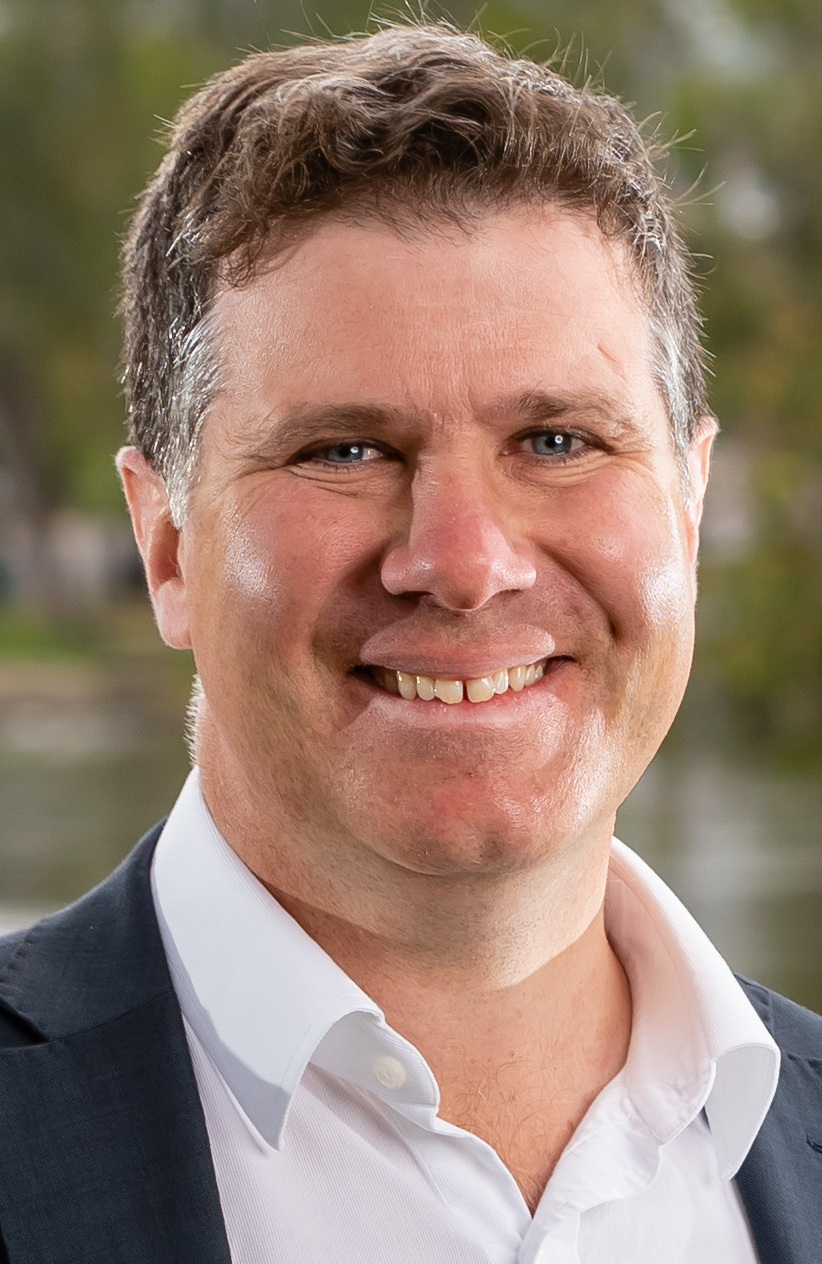

Deputy Leader of the Opposition in the Legislative Assembly in New South Wales
- Incumbent
- Assumed office 21 November 2025
- Leader: Kellie Sloane
- Preceded by: Robyn Preston

Member of the New South Wales Legislative Assembly for Albury
- Incumbent
- Assumed office 23 March 2019

Personal details
- Party: Liberal Party of Australia
- Occupation: Politician, vet
- Website: www.justinclancy.com.au

Justin Paul Clancy is an Australian politician. He has been a member of the New South Wales Legislative Assembly since 2019, representing Albury for the Liberal Party.

Clancy was educated at St Joseph's College, Hunters Hill and was a veterinarian before entering politics.

== Political career ==
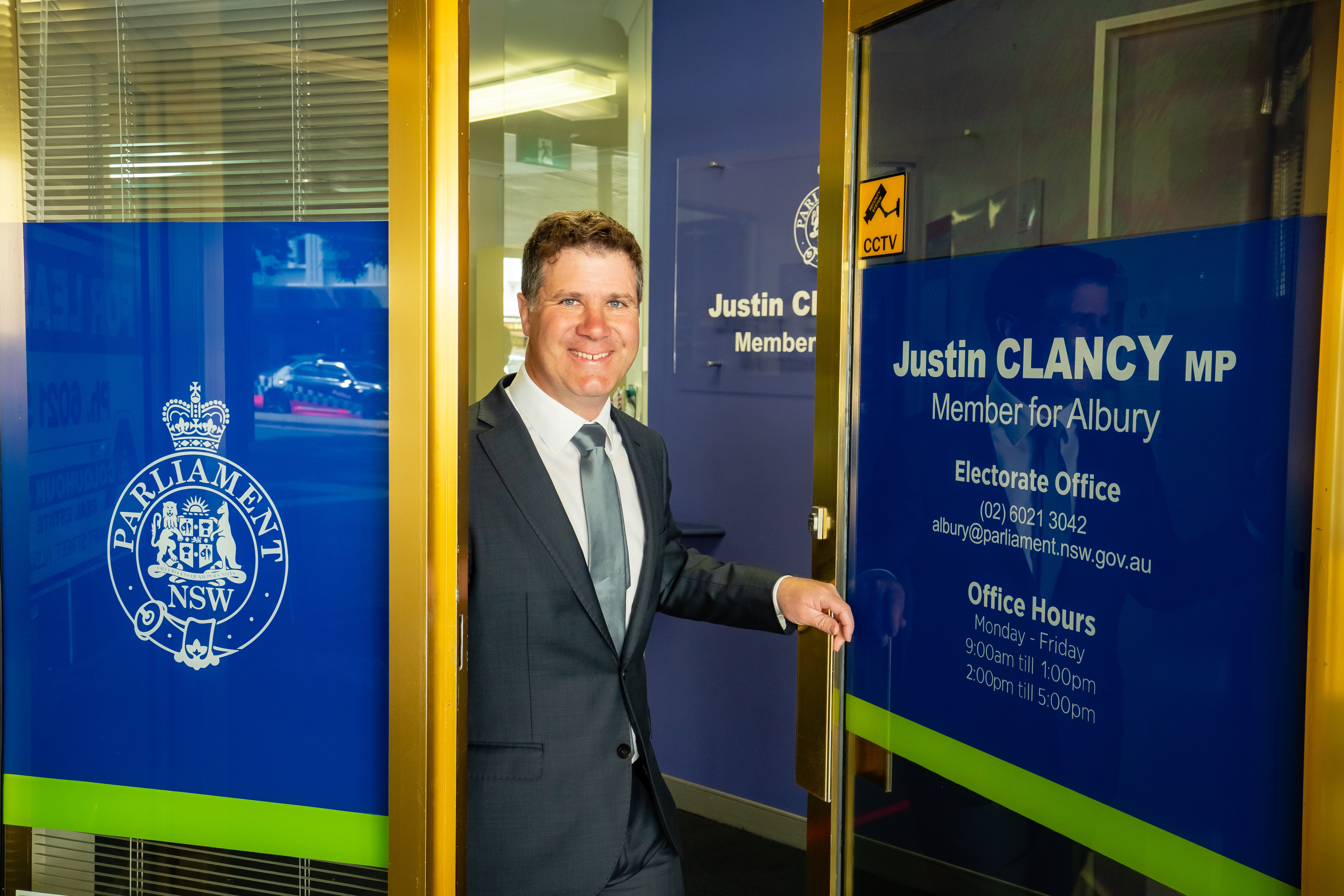
Justin Clancy MP in his Office

In November 2018, Clancy was endorsed by the Liberal Party to contest Albury at the 2019 state election, following the retirement of Greg Aplin. He comfortably won the seat with 56.8% of the primary vote, and 66% of the final vote. Clancy won again in the 2023 New South Wales state election with 53% of the primary vote, and 66.3% after preferences.

Clancy is a member of three parliamentary committees: Investment, Industry and Regional Development; Protecting Local Water Utilities from Privatisation; and Remote, Rural and Regional Health. He is also the former deputy chair of the Legislative Assembly Committee on Community Services.

New South Wales Legislative Assembly
Preceded by Greg Aplin	Member for Albury; 2019–present	Incumbent
