= Doug Padman =

Australian politician

The Honourable Doug Padman MLA OBE
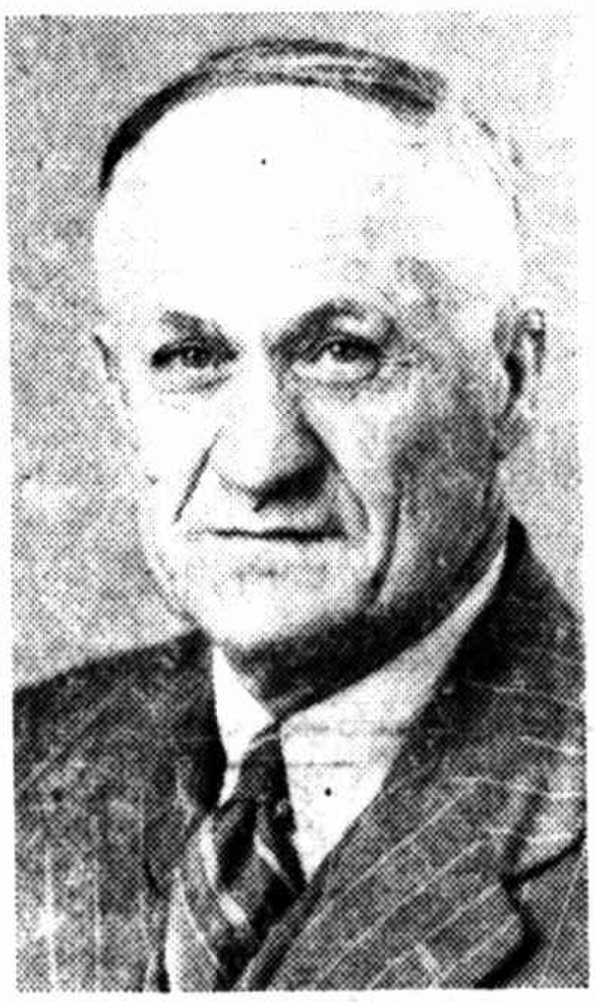

Member of the New South Wales Legislative Assembly for Albury
- In office 1947–1965
- Preceded by: John Hurley
- Succeeded by: Gordon Mackie

Mayor of Albury
- In office 1939–1945
- Preceded by: Alfred Waugh
- Succeeded by: Cleaver Bunton

Alderman on Albury Municipal Council
- In office 1930–1945

Personal details
- Born: 16 July 1885 Adelaide, British Province of South Australia
- Died: 31 August 1970 (aged 85) Albury, New South Wales, Australia
- Party: Liberal Party
- Spouse: Bertha Elizabeth Scholz (m. 1912)
- Children: 3
- Education: Prince Alfred College

Dudley Gordon Padman OBE (16 June 1885 – 31 August 1970) was an Australian politician who served as the member for Albury in the New South Wales Legislative Assembly as well as an alderman on and the Mayor of Albury Council.

== Early life ==
Padman was born in Adelaide and educated at Bridgewater, South Australia and Prince Alfred College. He married Bertha Elizabeth Scholz in 1912 and they had a daughter and two sons.

== Political career ==
He was an alderman of Albury Council from 1930 to 1947 and Mayor from 1939 until 1945.

Padman was elected as a member of the New South Wales Legislative Assembly representing the seat of Albury in 1947, and served until 1965.

== Later life ==
He was made an OBE in 1966. He died in Albury.

Political offices
Preceded by Alfred Waugh	Mayor of Albury; 1939 – 1945	Succeeded by Cleaver Bunton
New South Wales Legislative Assembly
Preceded by John Hurley	Member for Albury; 1947 – 1965	Succeeded by Gordon Mackie
