= Gordon Mackie (politician) =

Australian politician

Gordon Charlton Mackie (13 August 1911 – 5 May 1990) was an Australian politician, elected as a member of the New South Wales Legislative Assembly representing the seat of Albury.

Mackie moved to Albury as a young man where his father was a businessman and farmer and Gordon Mackie became a grazier. He served in the Second Australian Imperial Force during World War II. He married Edna and had one son and one daughter. He was a councillor of Culcairn Shire from 1959 until 1965 and deputy president of it from 1959 until 1965.

Mackie was elected the Liberal member for Albury in 1965 and held it until he retired in 1977. He was later replaced by Harold Mair in 1977. He died in Albury.

== Notes ==
New South Wales Legislative Assembly
Preceded by Doug Padman	Member for Albury; 1965 – 1978	Succeeded by Harold Mair
