= John Hurley (New South Wales politician, born 1894) =

Australian politician

Personal details
- Born: 21 July 1894 near Yarrawonga, Victoria
- Died: 27 August 1985 (aged 91) Henty, New South Wales
- Party: Labor Party

Cornelius John Hurley (21 July 1894 – 27 August 1985) was an Australian politician and a member of the New South Wales Legislative Assembly for 109 days in 1946–7. He was a member of the Labor Party.

== Early life ==
Hurley was born in Burramine near Yarrawonga, Victoria and was the son of a farmer. He was educated to elementary level at Telford Public School. He initially worked in rural industries and was a farmer near Henty after 1910. He was involved in community organizations including the Pastures Protection Board and the Australian Wheatgrowers' Federation.

== State Parliament ==
Hurley entered parliament as the Labor member for Albury after he won the November 1946 by-election caused by the resignation of the former premier and Liberal Party member Alexander Mair, who unsuccessfully contested the Senate election at the 1946 federal election. The election was a three-cornered contest between the Labor, Liberal and Country parties and Hurley's victory was achieved through a 15% leakage of second preference votes from the Liberal candidate. The final result was a 6% swing to Labor. However, Hurley's parliamentary career ended 109 days later when the 34th New South Wales Parliament was dissolved on 29 March 1947. At the ensuing state election he was defeated by 27 (0.09%) votes by Doug Padman, who was endorsed by both the Liberal party and the Country Party but sat in parliament as a Liberal. Hurley unsuccessfully re-contested the seat at the 1950 election and then retired from public life. He did not hold caucus, parliamentary or ministerial office.

New South Wales Legislative Assembly
Preceded by Alexander Mair	Member for Albury; 1946–1947	Succeeded by Doug Padman
