= Alexander Mair =

Australian politician

The Honourable Alexander Mair
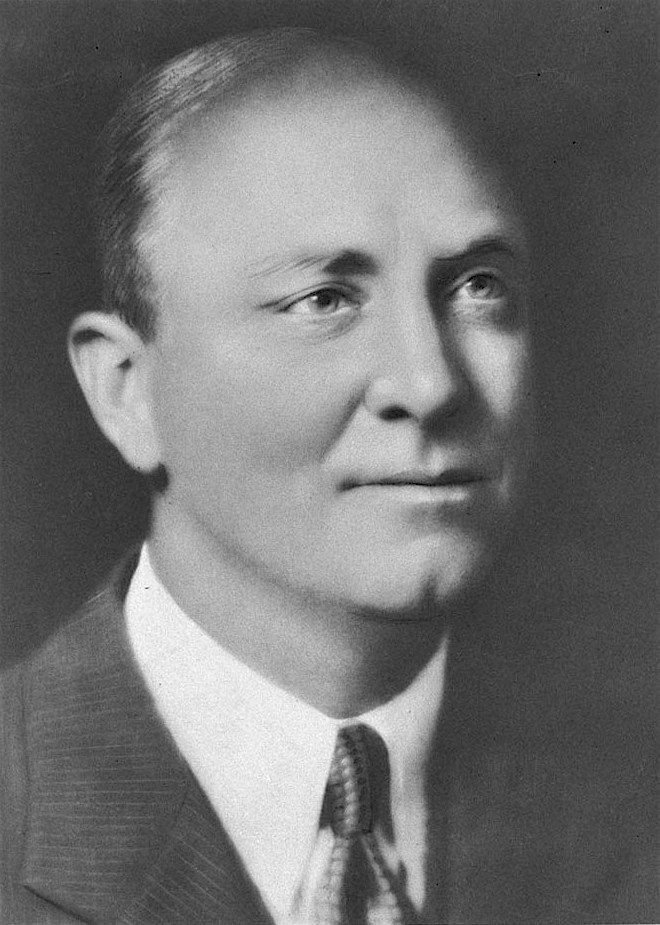
- Mair as Premier in 1940.

26th Premier of New South Wales
- In office 5 August 1939 – 16 May 1941
- Monarch: George VI
- Governor: Lord Wakehurst
- Deputy: Michael Bruxner
- Preceded by: Bertram Stevens
- Succeeded by: William McKell

Colonial Treasurer of New South Wales
- In office 13 October 1938 – 16 August 1939
- Preceded by: Bertram Stevens
- Succeeded by: Athol Richardson

Member of the New South Wales Parliament for Albury
- In office 11 June 1932 – 14 August 1946
- Preceded by: Joseph Fitzgerald
- Succeeded by: John Hurley

Personal details
- Born: 25 August 1889 Melbourne, Victoria
- Died: 3 August 1969 (aged 79) Melbourne, Victoria, Australia
- Party: United Australia Party (until 1943); Democratic Party (1943–1945); Liberal Party (from 1945)
- Spouse: Grace Lennox
- Children: 3

Alexander Mair (25 August 1889 – 3 August 1969) was an Australian politician who served as Premier of New South Wales from 5 August 1939 to 16 May 1941. Born in Melbourne, Mair worked in various businesses there before moving to Albury, New South Wales where he went on to be a member of the New South Wales Legislative Assembly for fourteen years. In 1932, Mair was elected to the seat of Albury and was re-elected a further four times. He rose quickly through the cabinet of Bertram Stevens' United Australia Party government, becoming an Assistant Minister in April 1938, Minister for Labour and Industry in June and Colonial Treasurer in October.

A staunch supporter of Stevens throughout his Premiership, Mair became his successor as Premier in August 1939 following Stevens' defeat in a no-confidence motion moved by renegade Minister, Eric Spooner. Becoming Premier at a difficult time for the government, Mair's leadership was marked by his unification of his formerly fractious party, the reining-in of government expenditure and increased taxes to reduce debt, and new labour laws to reduce unemployment. When the Second World War broke out in September 1939, Mair mobilised the state towards the war effort but found it difficult to communicate his message to the voters. He served as Premier until losing the May 1941 election to the Labor Party under William McKell, losing 20 seats.

Remaining as Opposition Leader, with the UAP shattered, Mair became leader of the new Democratic Party and was involved in the negotiations to unite the broken conservative parties and form the Liberal Party in 1945. When Reginald Weaver died in November 1945, only months after becoming the first leader of the Liberal Party in New South Wales, Mair was selected to succeed him. Mair remained as leader until he resigned in March 1946 to contest the Australian Senate. He was unsuccessful and thereafter retired back to Melbourne, where he died in 1969, aged 79.

== Early life ==
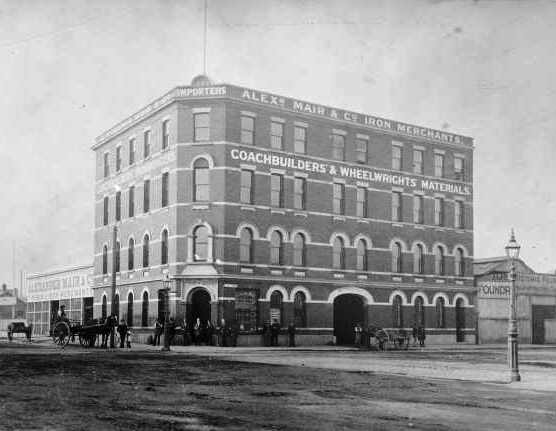
Alexander Mair & Co. offices on the corner of Victoria and Leicester Streets, Carlton, circa 1888.

Alexander Mair was born on 25 August 1889 in the Melbourne suburb of North Carlton, Victoria, the eldest child of Victorian-born parents Alexander Mair, a timber and steel merchant, and his wife Florence Mair (née Hunter). Mair was educated at Wesley College, where he excelled in sports, and then later at Bradshaw's Business College. Upon leaving education, Mair was employed in his father's company, Alexander Mair & Co, timber, iron and steel merchants. On 29 October 1913, Mair married Grace Lennox at the Scots' Church, Melbourne and together had two sons, John and Sandy, and a daughter, Margaret.

When his father also died in that year, Mair took charge of the company, which expanded into hardware. He involved himself in every facet of the company, often visiting overseas suppliers. However, a bout of influenza in the 1919 epidemic and subsequent asthma led him gradually to withdraw from business. In 1922 he sold the steelyard and then in 1925 sold the rest of the company's other assets to James McEwan & Co. Pty Ltd, serving as a director of the latter until 1927. In 1928, Mair purchased 'Rockwood', a grazing property outside of Albury, New South Wales, where the Mairs raised sheep and cattle as well as grain.

== Early political career ==
Mair first entered politics at the 11 June 1932 election, when he stood as the United Australia Party candidate for the local seat of Albury in the New South Wales Legislative Assembly. The election campaign was noted for having occurred not long after the dismissal of Premier Jack Lang, and was affected by violence by the right-wing New Guard. Despite this, Mair gained the seat from the Labor party member, Joseph Fitzgerald. Despite only gaining 30.65% of the primary vote to Fitzgerald's 40.07%, Mair was able to secure the seat with Country Party preferences, on a 58–41% margin.

As the local member, Mair became interested in helping those affected by the Great Depression and fulfilled his election promise to give most of his parliamentary salary to the poor in his own electorate, a practice which he continued until 1938. Serving on the backbench, Mair was noted for being a strong supporter of Premier Bertram Stevens at a time when party discipline within the UAP was non-existent. Mair soon built up a reputation for being a loyal, yet also strongly independent member of parliament, and a powerful debater in the House.

At the May 1935 election, Mair was returned in his seat with an increased margin of 59.03%. In 1937, he visited Britain with his wife for the coronation of King George VI and later attempted to enter the Soviet Union, in an attempt to study the social problems associated with a communist system, as a sailor on a Norwegian ship, but was refused entry.

== Minister of the Crown ==
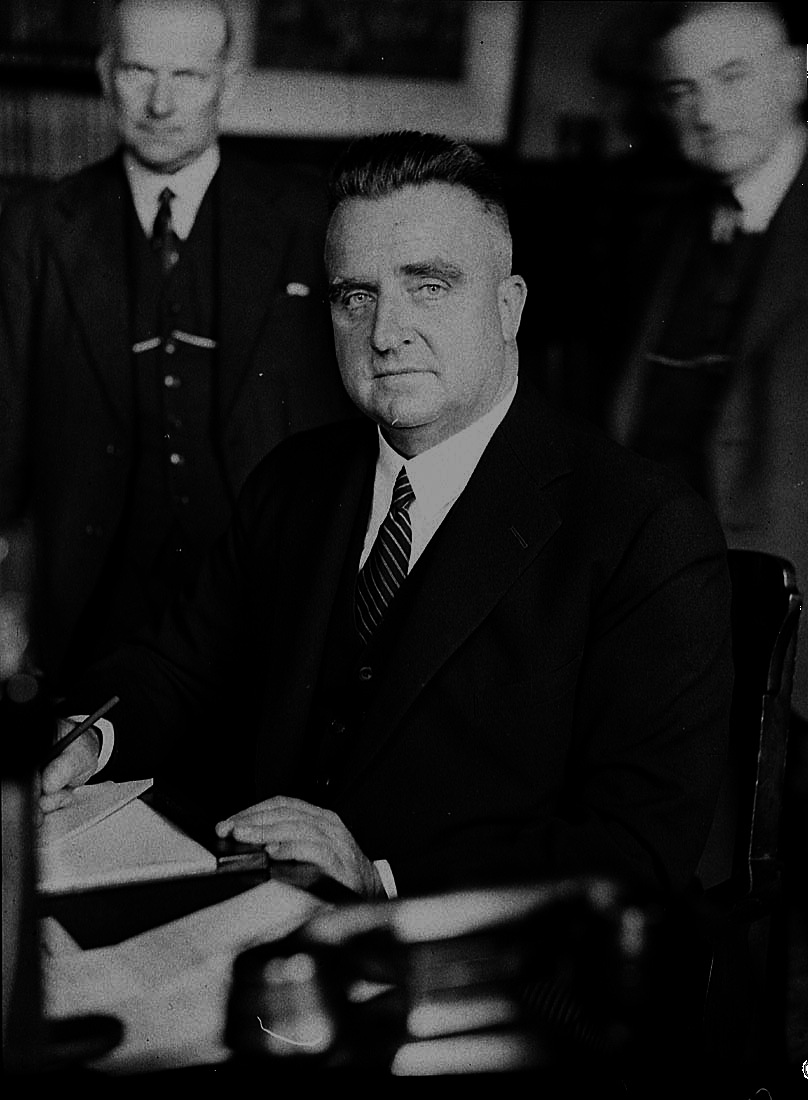
Premier Bertram Stevens. After Stevens' defeat in 1939, Mair was to remain loyal to him throughout his term as Premier.

At the March 1938 election, Mair was returned with a slightly reduced margin of 57.76%. On this occasion, however, Mair was appointed to Premier Stevens' new cabinet as an Assistant Minister on 13 April 1938. He served in this capacity for ten weeks until 1 June 1938, when he was promoted as the Minister for Labour and Industry, which had been vacated by the death of his predecessor, John Dunningham. Despite serving only a brief time in this portfolio, Mair was largely successful, gaining a reputation as understanding and sympathetic to worker's views, leading to the resolution of several industrial disputes.

He served until 13 October, when Premier Stevens promoted him as Colonial Treasurer. Upon taking office, Mair immediately proposed drastic cuts in expenditure to bring the budget back into balance, and to find new sources of taxation income. As part of this, he issued a circular to all government Ministers to declare any expenditure over £3000 to Treasury for approval. All complied except Deputy Leader and Minister for Public Works and Local Government, Eric Spooner, who sought to undermine confidence in Stevens' leadership. In July 1939, Stevens and Mair attempted to prevent Spooner's disruptive tactics by creating a committee of four, consisting of Mair, Stevens, Spooner and Country Party Leader, Michael Bruxner, to approve all expenditure. Furious at this gesture, Spooner resigned on 21 July 1939 as Minister and Deputy Leader, citing a 'disagreement in government policy on relief works' as the reason.

On 1 August 1939, Spooner carried a motion of no confidence in Stevens in the house, which unexpectedly passed by two votes, owing to the absence of several ministers. On 3 August Stevens tendered his resignation to the Governor, Lord Wakehurst, but was granted several days to remain until his successor was chosen. Upon the resignation, Spooner was touted as Stevens' possible successor until Deputy Premier Bruxner refused to form a coalition government with Spooner, who was opposed to Country Party influence, while Stevens attempted to gather support for Mair. At a party meeting on 5 August, Spooner chose not to nominate and Mair defeated Athol Richardson 18 votes to 6, becoming Leader of the United Australia Party and was sworn in as Premier by Lord Wakehurst on the same day.

== Premier of New South Wales ==
Inheriting an increasingly dysfunctional government and a deteriorating financial situation, Mair moved swiftly to combat party disunity but re-establishing the backbench policy committees that had fallen into disuse under Stevens. Mair called regular party meetings and his conciliatory manner soon united his formerly dysfunctional party. It was this party discipline and unity that was to be the hallmark of Mair's premiership. Identifying several key areas of reform, Mair moved to combat the economic situation by steeply raising taxation but also provided for a certain proportion of capital raised by wages and income tax to be spent on unemployment and social relief. Other areas included amendments to the Landlord and Tenant Act, assistance for country racing clubs and the providing of health and safety measures in coal mines. Despite this, Mair remained loyal to former leader Bertram Stevens. While speaking in Albury on 14 August, he commented: "What I learned under his capable leadership will be turned to the benefit of New South Wales."

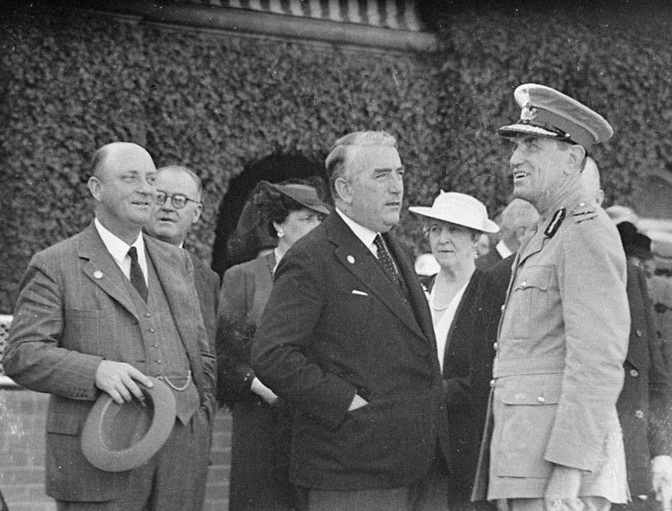
Premier Mair (left) with Prime Minister Robert Menzies (centre) and Governor Lord Wakehurst in March 1940. Mair was very critical of Menzies over the internment of enemy aliens during the war.

Mair extensively reshuffled his cabinet, announcing the new ministry on 16 August. Among the appointments included Athol Richardson as Colonial Treasurer, Lewis Martin took up Spooner's former roles of Public Works and Local Government and the relatively new Vernon Treatt as Minister for Justice. Faced with a population of 53,000 registered unemployed, on 30 August Mair made plans to combat youth unemployment by providing generous pension schemes for coalminers and introducing compulsory retirement at age 60, thereby halving the unemployment rate. Despite attempts to reassure business speculation over the outbreak of war, on 3 September 1939 the Second World War erupted. At the cabinet meeting the next day, Mair, both of his sons having enlisted, reaffirmed the need to support Britain and the Allies. Mair personally also took on this responsibility by contributing £4000 in war loans. In December, Mair's Government refused to register refugee German doctors and Mair later criticised Prime Minister Robert Menzies for not acting to intern enemy aliens. When Parliament returned in March 1940, the Opposition Leader, William McKell, moved a censure motion on the government, citing its ineffectiveness to act on unemployment and housing. Mair responded by tearing apart their arguments in a one-hour and a half long speech.

Mair's choice in Justice Minister Vernon Treatt proved problematic when it was alleged that he had acted to reduce fines for certain companies that had sold low-quality bread to the Defence Department. Despite a Royal Commission clearing Treatt of any wrongdoing, public confidence in the Mair Government had plummeted. At the campaign for the 10 May 1941 election, Mair performed poorly, finding it difficult to distinguish himself from his predecessor and proposing policies but only promising action after the war. McKell's Labor Party did the opposite, leaving war matters to the federal government and promising current reforms. At the election, the Labor Party polled more than half the vote while Bruxner's Country Party lost nine seats and Mair's UAP lost twenty seats: twelve to Labor, seven to independents and one to redistribution. Mair himself retained his seat with 52.47%. The conservative political forces would not take government again until under Robert Askin in 1965.

== Later career ==
=== Opposition ===
Mair now became Leader of the Opposition for the shattered conservative parties on 19 May 1941 and, despite the electoral defeat, pledged his full support for the government in war matters. However, with the very poor results of the federal United Australia Party under Billy Hughes at the 1943 Federal election, the UAP disintegrated. A large number of former UAP members then formed the Democratic Party in New South Wales, led by Mair, while others moved into the Commonwealth Party and the Liberal Democratic Party. The Democratic Party then merged with the Commonwealth Party in January 1944. With the conservative vote split in half, Mair had little chance, and resigned as Democratic Party Leader on 10 February 1944, to be replaced by Deputy Leader Reginald Weaver, who then became Leader of the Opposition, with Mair becoming Deputy Leader. Weaver and Mair led the hopelessly divided conservative forces to defeat at the 27 May 1944 election, losing another three seats. It was also the last state election contested by Mair, which he retained his seat for the last time with 53.06%.

Following the electoral defeat, Mair played a central role in the negotiations to merge the conservative parties to form Robert Menzies' newly created Liberal Party, becoming a delegate for the Canberra Conference in October 1944 and hosting the second party conference in his seat in Albury at Mate's Department Store. Despite initial efforts to merge the Democratic Party with the Liberal Democratic Party becoming deadlocked over questions of party organisation and by acrimony between Weaver and the LDP leader, Ernest K White, they were ultimately successful and the Liberal party was born in early 1945. Serving on the Liberals' New South Wales executive from 1945 to 1946, when first party leader Weaver died suddenly on 12 November 1945, Mair was chosen to succeed him.

He served as the second Leader of the New South Wales Liberal Party only briefly until he resigned as leader on 21 March 1946, being succeeded by his former Minister for Justice, Vernon Treatt. On 14 August 1946, after serving fourteen years in the New South Wales Parliament, Mair resigned his seat to run for a place in the Australian Senate for New South Wales. At the federal election held on 28 September 1946, the Liberal Party was defeated and failed to win any Senate seats up for election, as the electoral system up to the 1949 election tended to give all seats in each state to the party that won the most votes.

=== After politics ===
Mair now retired from politics and returned to his property in Albury, but witnessed the loss of his former seat to the Labor Party at the 9 November by-election. Mair, however, then assisted in returning his seat to the Liberal Party at the May 1947 election. In 1948, he sold 'Rockwood'.

Returning to Melbourne in 1949, Mair took up various business and organisation positions, including as a board member of the Melbourne Dental Hospital, a national councillor for the Young Men's Christian Association, vice-president of the Royal Victorian Institute for the Blind and vice-president of the Guide Dogs for the Blind. On 12 January 1949, King George VI, on the advice of the Governor of New South Wales, John Northcott, granted him retention of the title "The Honourable" for life, for having served more than three years on the Executive Council of New South Wales.

Almost a quarter of a century after he left Parliament, Mair died on 3 August 1969 in his St Kilda home, survived by his wife, two sons and daughter.

== Bibliography ==
- Clune, David; Turner, Ken (2006). "Alexander Mair". The Premiers of New South Wales 1856–2005. Vol. 2, 1901–2005. Sydney: Federation Press. pp. 237–246. ISBN 9781862875494.

New South Wales Legislative Assembly
Preceded by Joseph Fitzgerald	Member for Albury; 1932–1946	Succeeded by John Hurley
Political offices
Preceded by John Dunningham	Minister for Labour and Industry; 1938	Succeeded by Herbert Hawkins
Preceded by Bertram Stevens	Colonial Treasurer of New South Wales; 1938–1939	Succeeded by Athol Richardson
Preceded by Bertram Stevens	Premier of New South Wales; 1939–1941	Succeeded by William McKell
Preceded by Bertram Stevens	Secretary for Public Works; 1939	Succeeded by Lewis Martin
Preceded by Bertram Stevens	Minister for Local Government; 1939	Succeeded by Lewis Martin
Preceded by William McKell	Leader of the Opposition of New South Wales; 1941–1944	Succeeded by Reginald Weaver
Preceded by Reginald Weaver	Leader of the Opposition of New South Wales; 1945–1946	Succeeded by Vernon Treatt
Party political offices
Preceded by Bertram Stevens	Leader of the United Australia Party; 1939–1943	Party disbanded
New political party	Leader of the Democratic Party; 1943–1944	Succeeded by Reginald Weaver
Preceded by Reginald Weaver	Deputy Leader of the Democratic Party; 1944–1945	Party disbanded
Preceded by Reginald Weaver	Leader of the New South Wales Liberal Party; 1945–1946	Succeeded by Vernon Treatt
