= Royal Flying Doctor Service =

Aeromedical organisation in Australia

- Abbreviation: RFDS
- Predecessor: AIM Aerial Medical Service
- Established: 15 May 1928; 98 years ago
- Founder: John Flynn
- Founded at: Cloncurry, Queensland, Australia
- Type: Not-for-profit organisation
- Legal status: Charity
- Headquarters: Canberra, Australia
- Region served: Australia
- Services: Aeromedical retrieval; Primary care
- National Board Chair: Tracey Hayes
- National Deputy Chair: John O'Donnell
- Affiliations: Six autonomous regional divisions and a national office
- Website: flyingdoctor.org.au

The Royal Flying Doctor Service (RFDS), commonly known as the Flying Doctor, is an aeromedical retrieval service in Australia. It is a non-profit organisation that provides urgent and emergency medical transport for patients in rural and remote areas of Australia who require transfer to a higher level of care (such as a tertiary referral hospital). The RFDS also provides primary health care services such as general practice, mental health and allied health to remote communities who would otherwise have limited access.

The RFDS operates as a federation of six regional organisations, known as Sections and Operations, which are overseen and coordinated nationally by RFDS of Australia. Founded in 1928, the RFDS was the world's first comprehensive civilian aeromedical service, and remains one of the largest aeromedical emergency and healthcare services in the world.

== History ==
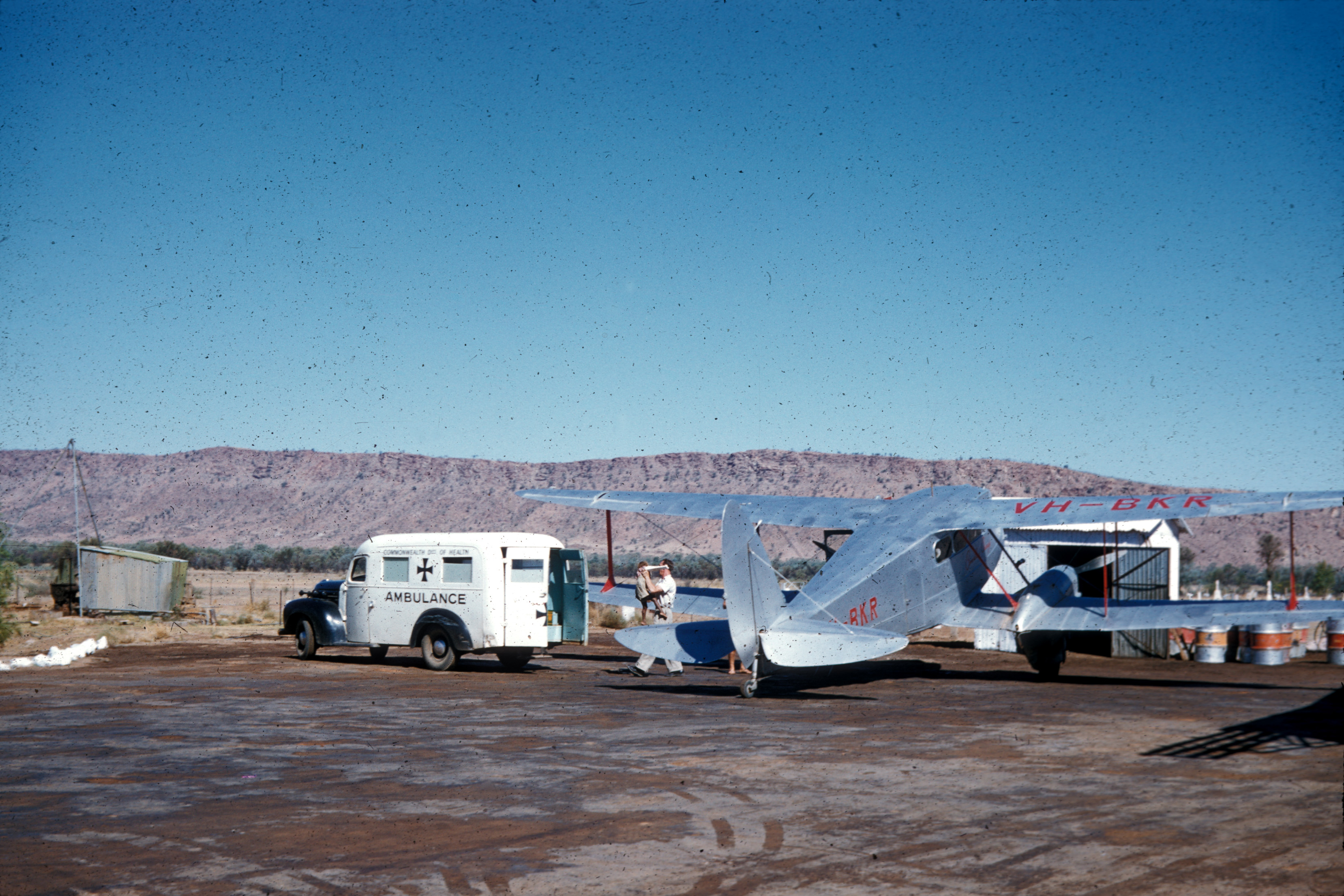
The Flying Doctor at Connellan's airstrip in Alice Springs (Mparntwe), c.1960s

=== "Mantle of safety" ===
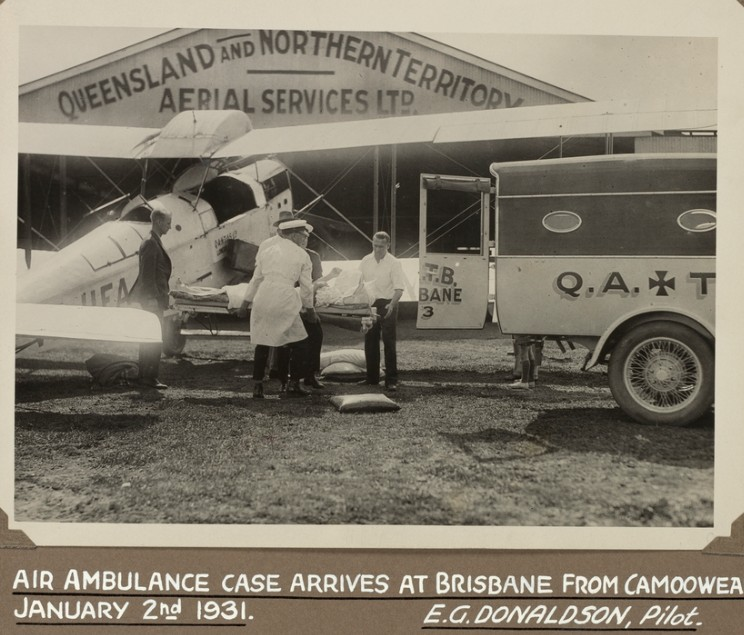
One of the De Havilland DH.50's flown by Qantas, doing ambulance work, delivering a patient to Brisbane in 1931.

Reverend John Flynn had worked in rural and remote areas of Victoria and was commissioned by the Presbyterian Church to look at the needs of people living in the outback. His report to the Presbyterian Assembly in 1912 resulted in the establishment of the Australian Inland Mission (AIM), of which he was appointed Superintendent. In 1928, he formed the AIM Aerial Medical Service, a one-year experiment based in Cloncurry, Queensland. This experiment later became The Royal Flying Doctor Service.

Flynn's missionary work involved the establishment of hospitals in bush communities, but this did not help those who lived far from any major community. In his public speaking he would often retell the tragic circumstances that had befallen several bush settlers. The fate of Jimmy Darcy, in 1917, was one of these stories.

==== Jimmy Darcy ====
Darcy was a stockman at Ruby Plains, a remote cattle station in Western Australia. After being found injured with a ruptured bladder by some friends, he was transported over 30 miles (12 hours), to the nearest town, Halls Creek. Here, Darcy was met by FW Tuckett, the Postmaster, and the only man in the settlement trained in first aid. Tuckett said there was nothing he could reliably do for injuries so serious, and tried unsuccessfully to contact doctors at Wyndham, and then Derby, by telegraph. He eventually got through to a doctor in Perth. Through communication by morse code, Dr. Holland guided Tuckett through two rather messy bladder operations using the only sharp instrument available, a pen knife. Due to the total absence of any medical facilities, Darcy had been operated on strapped to the Post Office counter, having first been made insensible with whisky. Holland then travelled 10 days to Halls Creek on a boat for cattle transport, a Model T Ford, a horse-drawn carriage, and even on foot, only to find that Darcy had died the day before. The operations had been successful, but the stockman had died from an undiagnosed case of malaria and a ruptured abscess in his appendix.

It was from stories such as this that Flynn, and his following at the AIM, became inspired to develop a route of communications that could solve the problem of remoteness, but no feasible technology seemed apparent.

=== Flight and radio: the fusion of two fledgling technologies ===
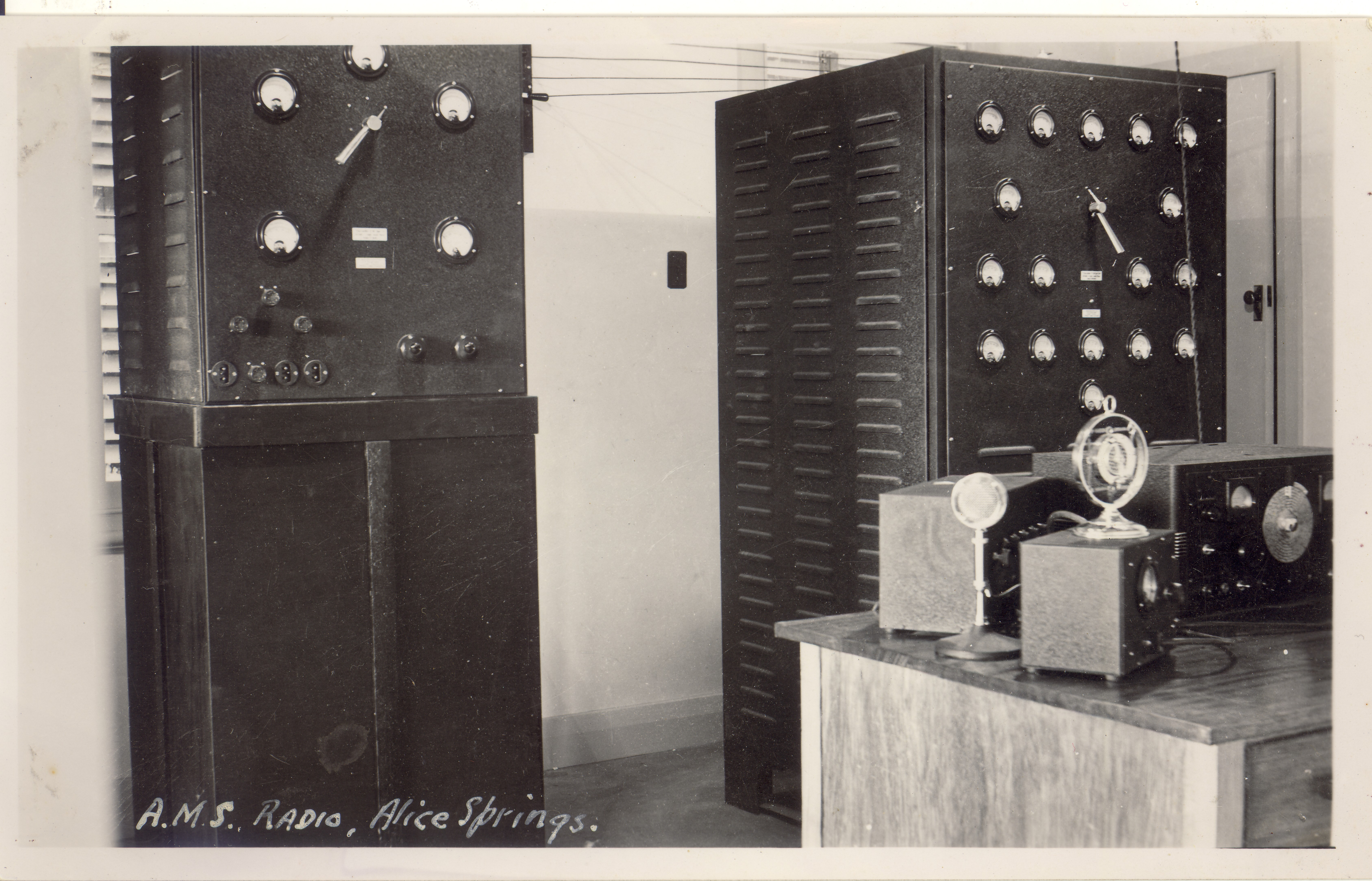
AIM [Aerial Medical Service] AMS radio, Alice Springs

Victorian pilot Lieutenant (John) Clifford Peel had heard Flynn's public speeches, and on being shipped out to France for World War I in 1917, sent Flynn a letter explaining how he had seen a missionary doctor visiting isolated patients using a plane. Assisted by costing estimates by Peel, Flynn immediately took the idea of using aircraft to begin his idea, and published Peel's idea in the church's newsletter. Peel died in combat in September 1918, probably not even knowing the impact he had in the creation of an Australian icon.

Along with motorised flight, another new technology was being developed that could replace the complicated means of communication by telegraph. Together with Alfred Traeger, Flynn began experiments with radio in the mid-1920s to enable remote outposts to contact a centralised medical base. The pedal radio was the first result of this collaboration. These were distributed gradually to stations, missions and other human residences around Cloncurry, the base site for a 50-watt transmitter.

Experimental aerial medical services commenced in 1926 and an injured miner was transported by air from Mount Isa to Cloncurry in November 1927.

By 1928, Flynn had gathered sufficient funds through fundraising activities to launch the experiment of the AMS on 15 May. Its supporters included industrialist HV McKay, medical doctor George Simpson and Hudson Fysh, one of the founders of Qantas. Qantas supplied the first aircraft to the fledgling organisation, VH-UER a De Havilland DH.50, dubbed "Victory". On 17 May 1928, two days after inception, the service's first official flight piloted by Arthur Affleck departed from Cloncurry, 85 miles to Julia Creek in Central Queensland, where the plane was met by over 100 people at the airstrip. Qantas charged two shillings per mile for use of the Victory during the first year of the project.

=== Current operations ===
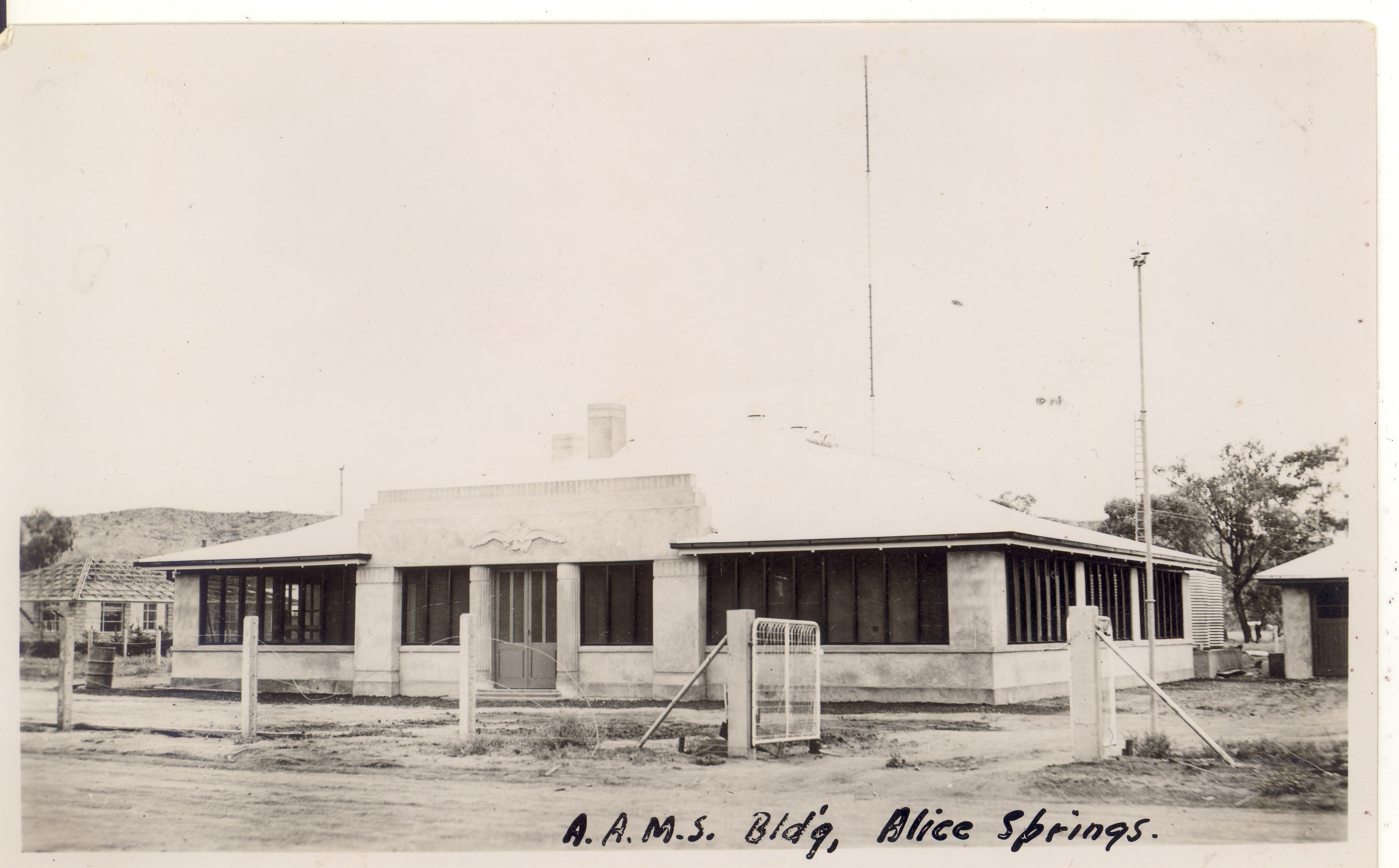
AIM Aerial Medical Service Building, Alice Springs

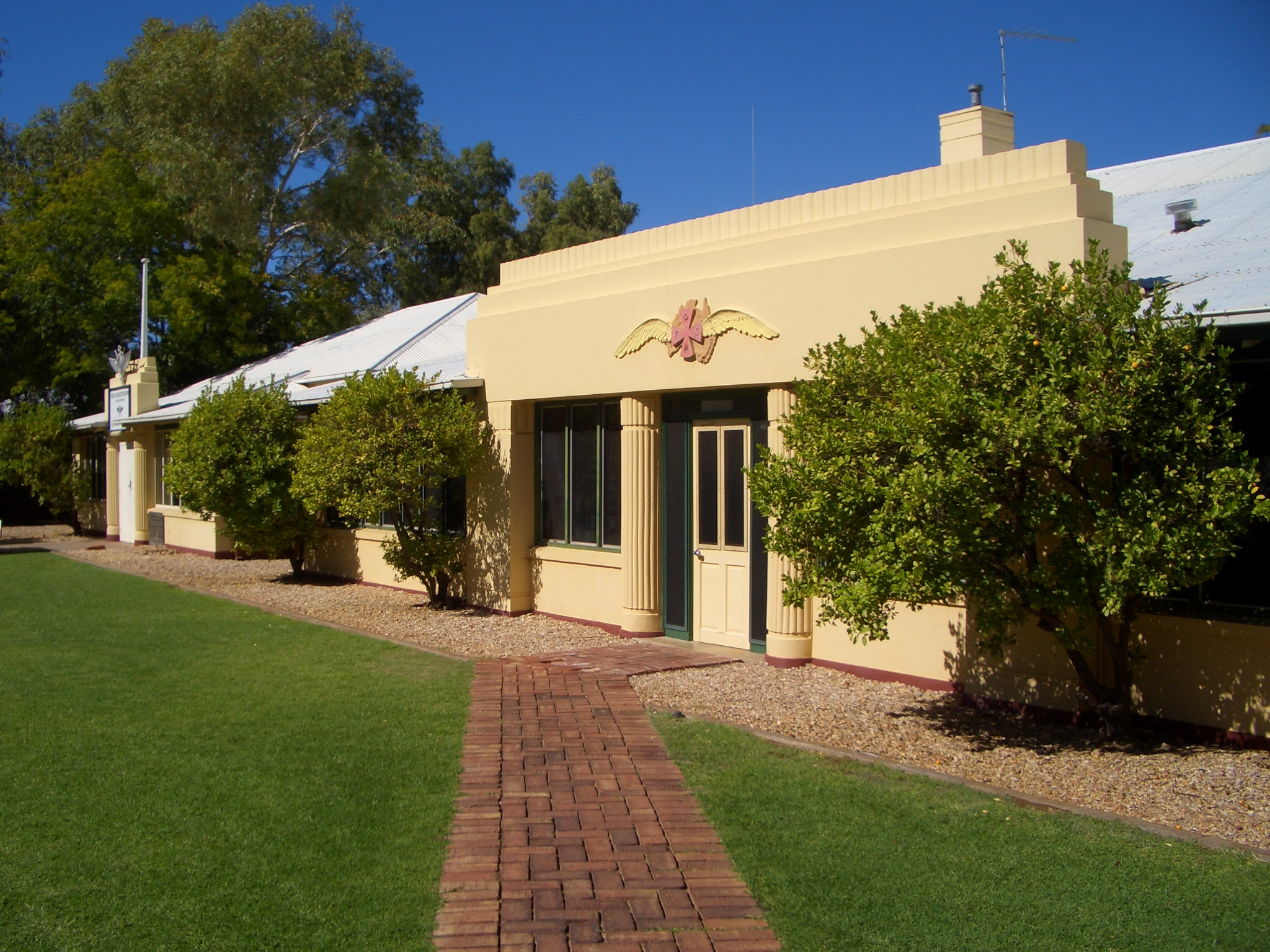
Dispatch service building, Alice Springs

Within the first year of operations, the service flew approximately 20,000 miles in 50 flights, becoming the first comprehensive air ambulance service in the world. The service persisted through difficult first years, dealing with postwar Australia and the Great Depression of the 1930s. During its first few decades the service relied heavily on community fundraising, volunteer support and donations. Nowadays, the service is supported by the Commonwealth, State and Territory Governments, but still relies heavily on fundraising and donations from the community to purchase and medically equip its aircraft, and to finance other major capital initiatives. Until the 1960s the service predominantly hired aircraft, pilots and service technicians from contractors. After this point, the service moved on to purchasing its own equipment and employing its own pilots and mechanics.

In 1932, the success from its operations in Cloncurry, and the increasing public awareness to this vital rural service, resulted in a push for a national network of flying doctors, hopefully with sponsorship from the government. In 1934 this was realised with the new Australian Aerial Medical Service opening up "Sections" across the nation. Bases were set up in Wyndham, Port Hedland, Kalgoorlie, Broken Hill, Alice Springs and Meekatharra. The Queensland experiment was expanded with two additional bases opening in Charters Towers and Charleville. An official Federal Council for the organisation was formed in 1936. In 1937, Dr Jean White became the first female flying doctor in Australia, and the world, when she started work at Normanton. In 1942 the service was again renamed as the Flying Doctor Service, with Royal being bestowed upon the service in 1955. On 22 October 1958, Holden car manufacturers donated its 500,000th vehicle to the service in Melbourne.

Sister Myra Blanch was one of the first nurses, known as "Flying Sisters", to join the service. She was key in the New South Wales Section operations during the 1940s and 50s, though nurses did not serve regularly until the 1960s. Many patient transports are conducted with an RFDS nurse and pilot only on board. Nurses have been responsible for many innovations to the service, including an addition to the RFDS medical chest to incorporate a "body chart" (1951). The chart was an anatomical representation of a human being, with areas clearly numbered. With such a chart, a remote doctor can ask the patient "where is the pain felt?" and receive a comprehensible reply. The medicines contained in the chest are similarly numbered for ease in communicating medical instructions.

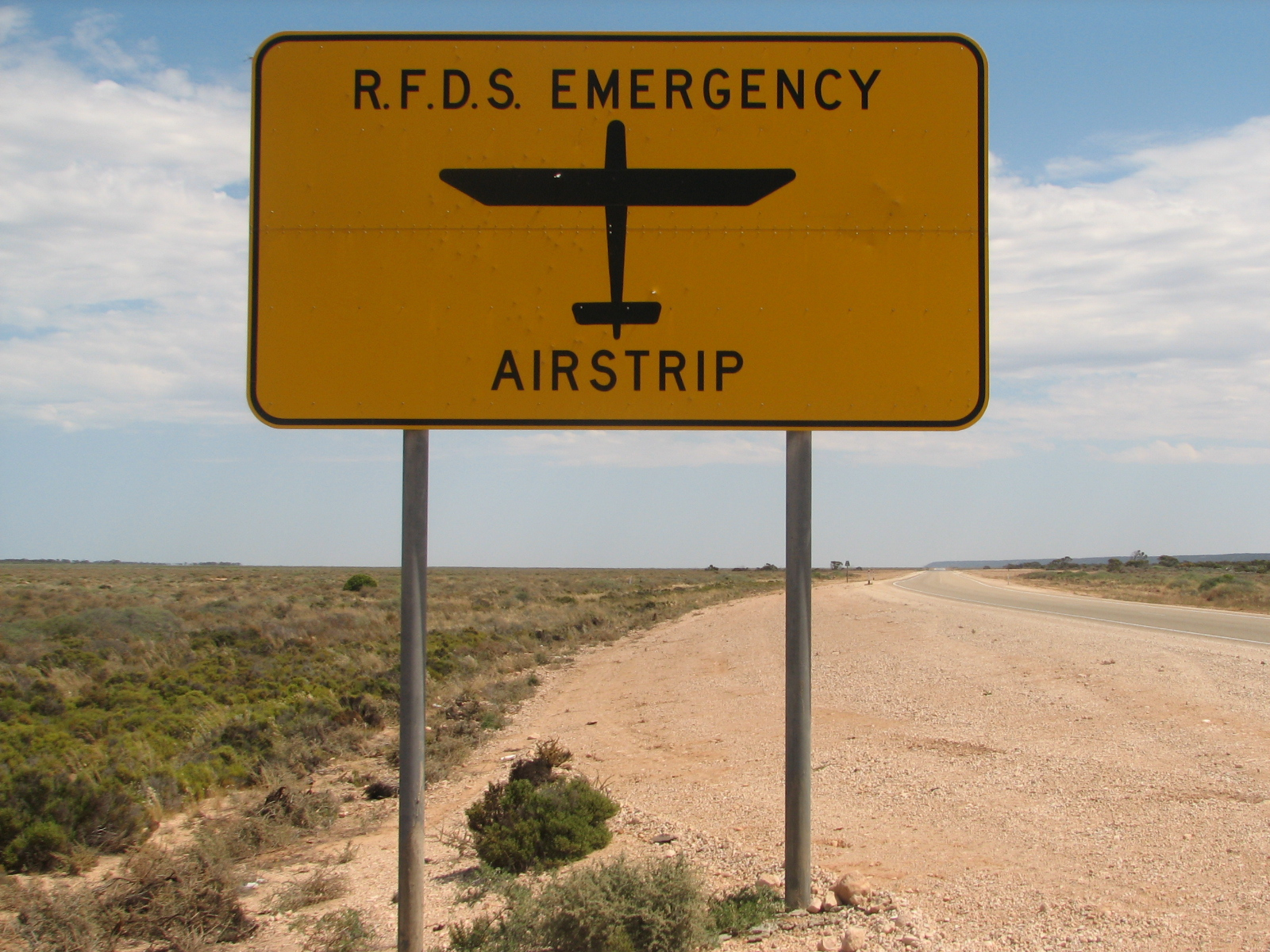
A sign on the Eyre Highway indicating that an RFDS emergency airstrip is ahead. There are three such strips on the highway.

The service is still heavily reliant on community support for funding, particularly through events such as the Simpson Desert Bike Challenge, and is well respected across the country as an organisation that has contributed much to rural, regional and remote communities.

Its services include:

- Emergency - primary aeromedical response to accident or illness
- Emergency - secondary aeromedical evacuation and medical retrieval services
- Non-Emergency Transport - by aeromedical and road ambulances
- Telehealth - 24 hours per day, 7 days per week, medical consultation services by radio, telephone or video call
- Primary health care clinics - the transportation of general practitioners, nurses and allied health professionals for regular clinical visits to remote areas (often a circuit visiting several communities and/or stations). Clinics include general practice, nurse-led child and maternal health, Aboriginal and Torres Strait Islander health, Rural Women's GP Service, mental health, dental services, allied health and medical specialists.
- Consultation, communication, and support for rural and remote doctors across Australia
- Inter-hospital transfer of patients
- Education and training opportunities and midwifery scholarships

The service also uses not just aircraft but also four-wheel drives and other utility land vehicles to aid in transportation and communications.

Cardiovascular emergencies represent a significant proportion of RFDS aeromedical retrievals. In rural and remote Australia, where cardiac catheterisation laboratories and specialist cardiology services are unavailable, the RFDS provides a critical link between initial stabilisation at the local rural hospital and definitive cardiac care at tertiary centres. Rural and remote medical officers initiate emergency management of conditions including ST-elevation myocardial infarction, acute heart failure, and life-threatening arrhythmias before coordinating transfer through RFDS retrieval services. Timely aeromedical retrieval in these settings is essential to minimising the mortality gap between rural and metropolitan patients with acute cardiovascular disease.

=== Organisation ===
The RFDS is made up of seven legal entities: RFDS of Australia (federation office), Central Operations, Queensland Section, South Eastern Section, Tasmania, Victoria and Western Operations. The RFDS operates in a federated structure and each of the seven entities has its own Board and Management. Each entity operates independently, both financially and operationally.

The Flying Doctor operates from numerous bases, health services and other facilities (including marketing, fundraising and public relations as well as the national office) across Australia.

RFDS bases are operated by:

- Central Operations - with bases at Adelaide Airport, Alice Springs Airport and Port Augusta Airport, and health services at Andamooka, Marla and Marree.
- South Eastern Section - Broken Hill, New South Wales; Dubbo, New South Wales; Launceston, Tasmania; Essendon Airport; and Sydney Airport and Bankstown Airport in Sydney.
- Victoria Operations - bases across the state, including Essendon Airport; and a fleet of more than 100 road ambulances operating from more than 20 rural and regional bases. The Victorian Section office is in Richmond, an inner eastern suburb of Melbourne.
- Queensland Section - Brisbane Airport, Bundaberg Airport, Cairns Airport, Roma Airport, Charleville, Longreach, Mount Isa, Rockhampton and Townsville Airport
- Western Operations - Broome, Kalgoorlie, Meekatharra, Perth's Jandakot Airport, and Port Hedland. The Rio Tinto LifeFlight Pilatus PC-24 jets are located in Broome and Jandakot.

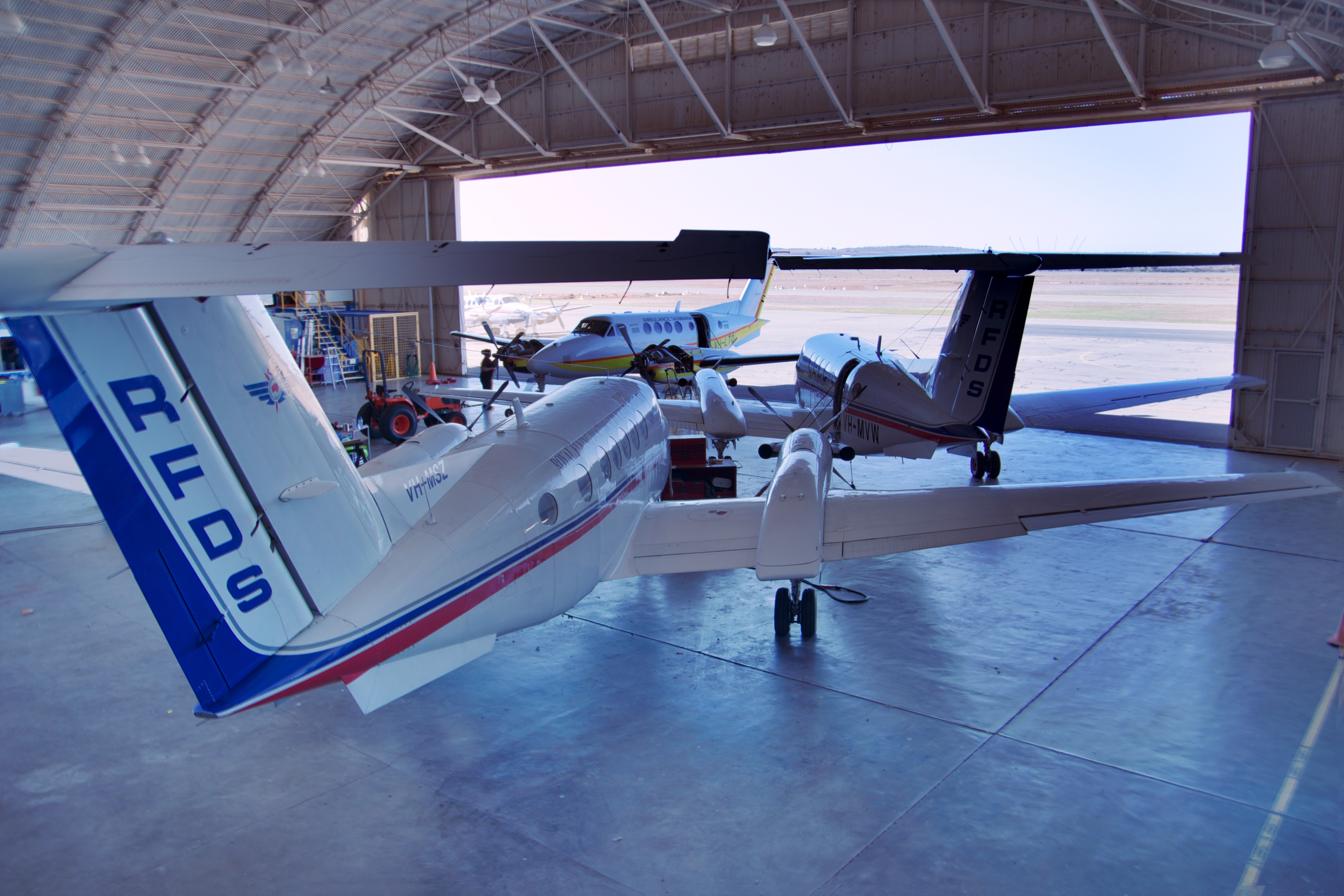
Royal Flying Doctor Service hangar, Broken Hill, New South Wales

Bases at Carnarvon, Geraldton, Derby, and Wyndham have closed, while the original base at Cloncurry was moved to Mount Isa in 1965 and the early base at Charters Towers moved to Cairns in 1972. The most recent new base was opened in Broome in 2016.

=== Aircraft ===
The first aircraft operated by the "Aerial Medical Service" in 1928 was a de Havilland DH.50 hired from the fledgling Qantas. It was replaced in 1934 by a DH.83 Fox Moth.

During the 1930s and 1940s the fleet consisted of a mix of de Havilland DH.50s, DH.83 Fox Moths, DH.84 Dragons, DH.104 Doves and the de Havilland Australia DHA-3 Drover.

From the 1950s to 1970s, the fleet included the Beechcraft Baron, Beechcraft Travel Air, Beechcraft Queen Air, Beechcraft Duke, Cessna 180, Cessna 182, Cessna 421, Piper Cherokee and Piper PA-31 Navajo.

Aircraft were provided by contractors until the 1960s. Subsequently, the RFDS owned its own aircraft and employed its own pilots and engineers.

In the late 1960s the NSW Section operated two British built Beagle B.206 Mk2 until replaced in the late 70s when the RFDS base at Broken Hill operated the Australian-made GAF Nomad.

From the 1980s to the 2000s, the fleet included the Cessna 404 and Cessna 441.

For a time in the mid-2000s the aeromedical evacuation aircraft used were either the Pilatus PC-12 or the Beechcraft King Air 200 series. The internal configuration of these two aircraft varies in the different RFDS sections. Typically they are configured with two rear-facing seats which look onto two stretchers. In some aircraft, one stretcher can be removed quickly and two seats slipped into place instead.

The PC-12, PC-24 and King Air are pressurised and so can safely transport patients who would not otherwise tolerate the decreased air pressure in a non-pressurised aircraft. The internal cabin pressure can be maintained throughout the flight at that of sea level. This is important for patients critically sensitive to pressure changes. Also, pressurised aircraft can fly at high enough altitude to be above turbulent weather. This is of great benefit in providing an environment safe for the patient and staff, and also limits complications of aeromedical transport such as motion sickness and exacerbation of injuries such as unstable fractures.

In October 2009 the standardisation on the two aircraft types ended when two Cessna 208B Grand Caravans and a Hawker 800XP joined the fleet.

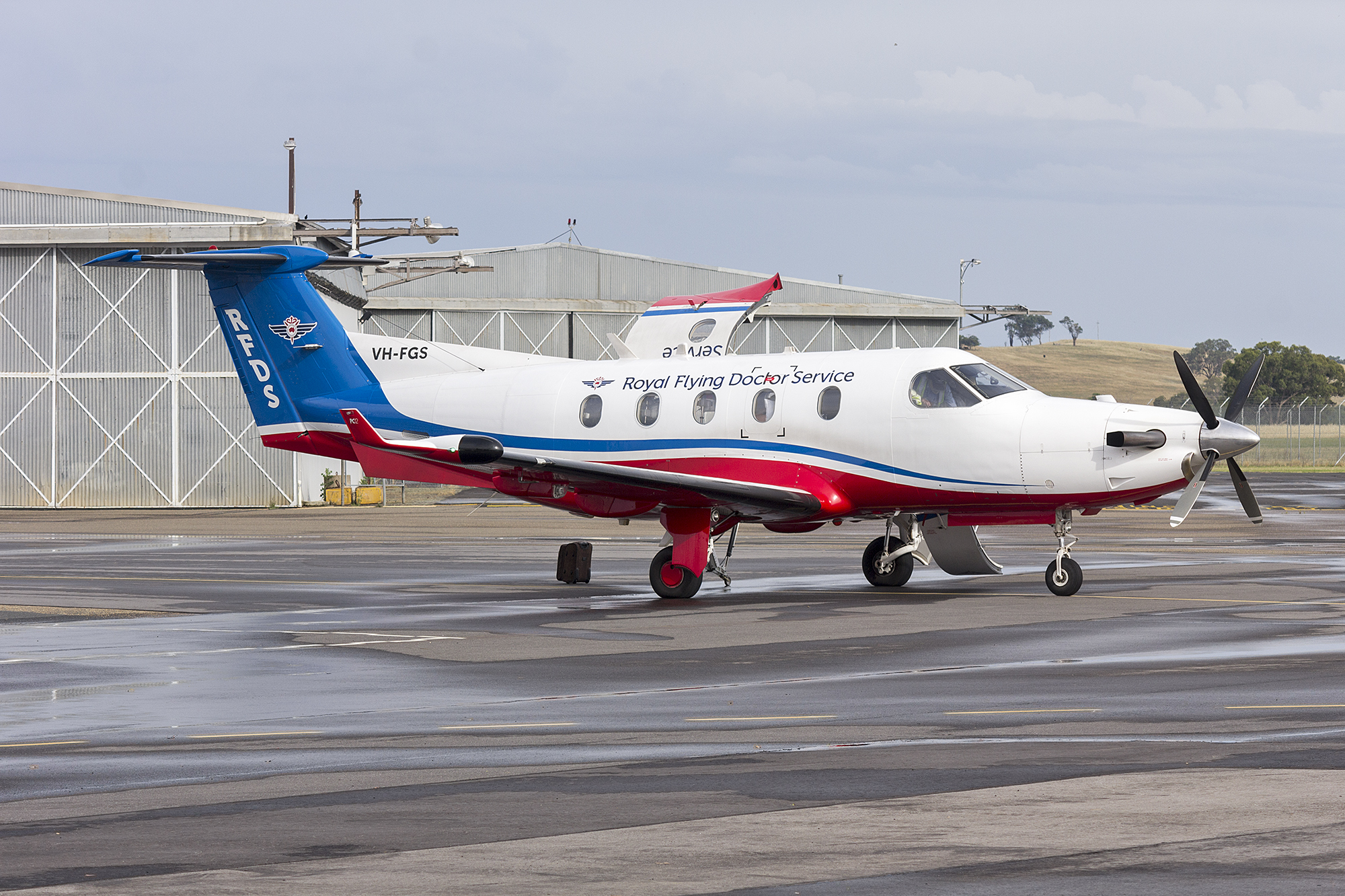
Pilatus PC-12-45

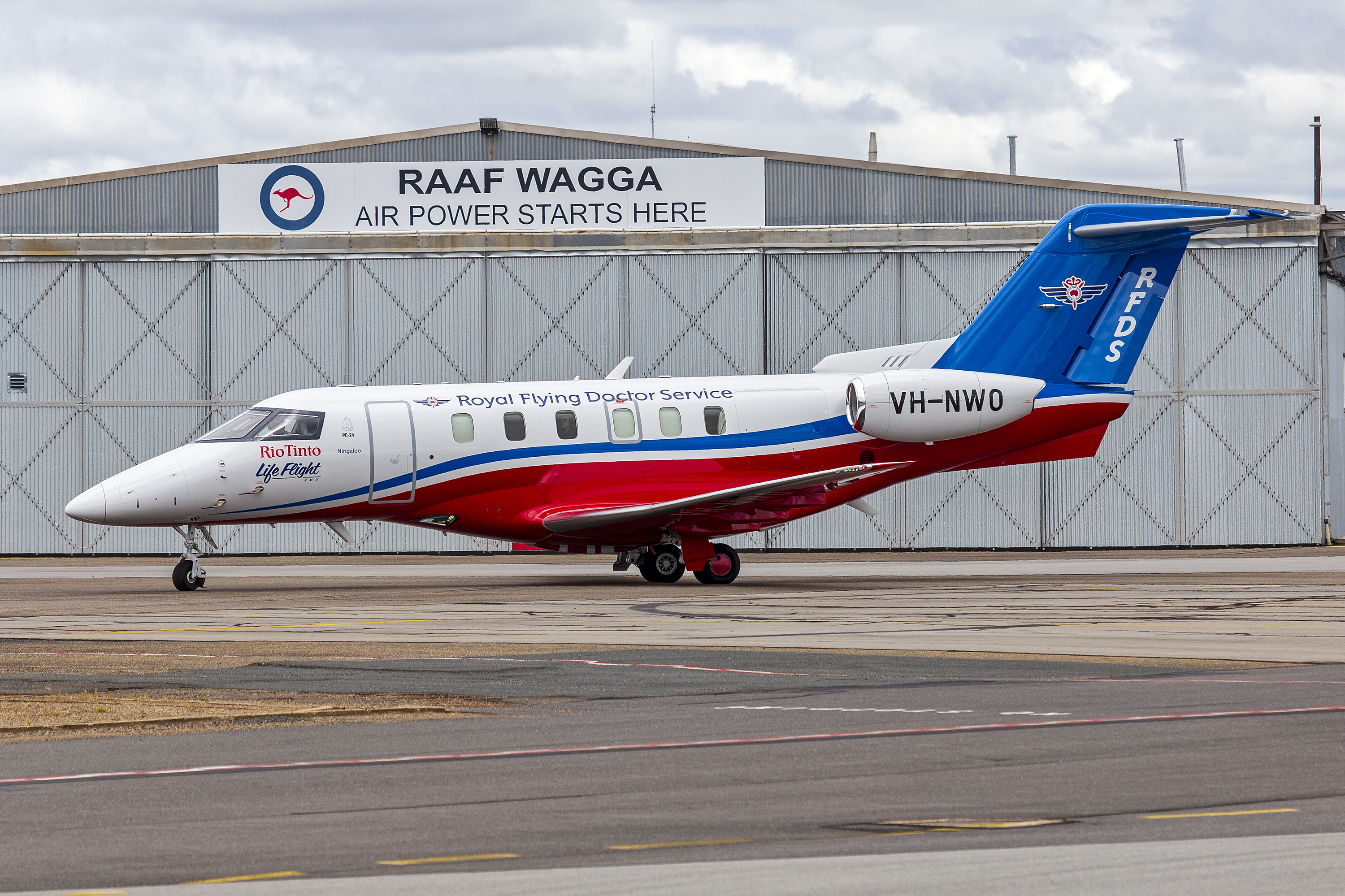
Pilatus PC-24

Royal Flying Doctor Service of Australia fleet (as of March 2023)
Aircraft	In service	Patients	Crew (including pilots)	Notes
Airbus EC145	2	2 (1 stretcher)	3	
Beechcraft B200	17	5 (2 stretchers)	3	
Beechcraft B200C	13	5 (2 stretchers)	3	
Beechcraft B300C	10	5 (2 stretchers)	3	
Pilatus PC-12	35	5 (2 stretchers)	3	
Pilatus PC-24	4	5 (3 stretchers)		
Total	81			

The South Eastern Section operates 18 King Airs (B200, B200C, B300C); The Queensland Section operates 20 King Airs (B200, B200C, B300C) and 3 PC-12s; The Western Operations operates 16 PC-12s and 3 PC-24; and Central Operations operates 19 PC-12 and 2 PC-24.

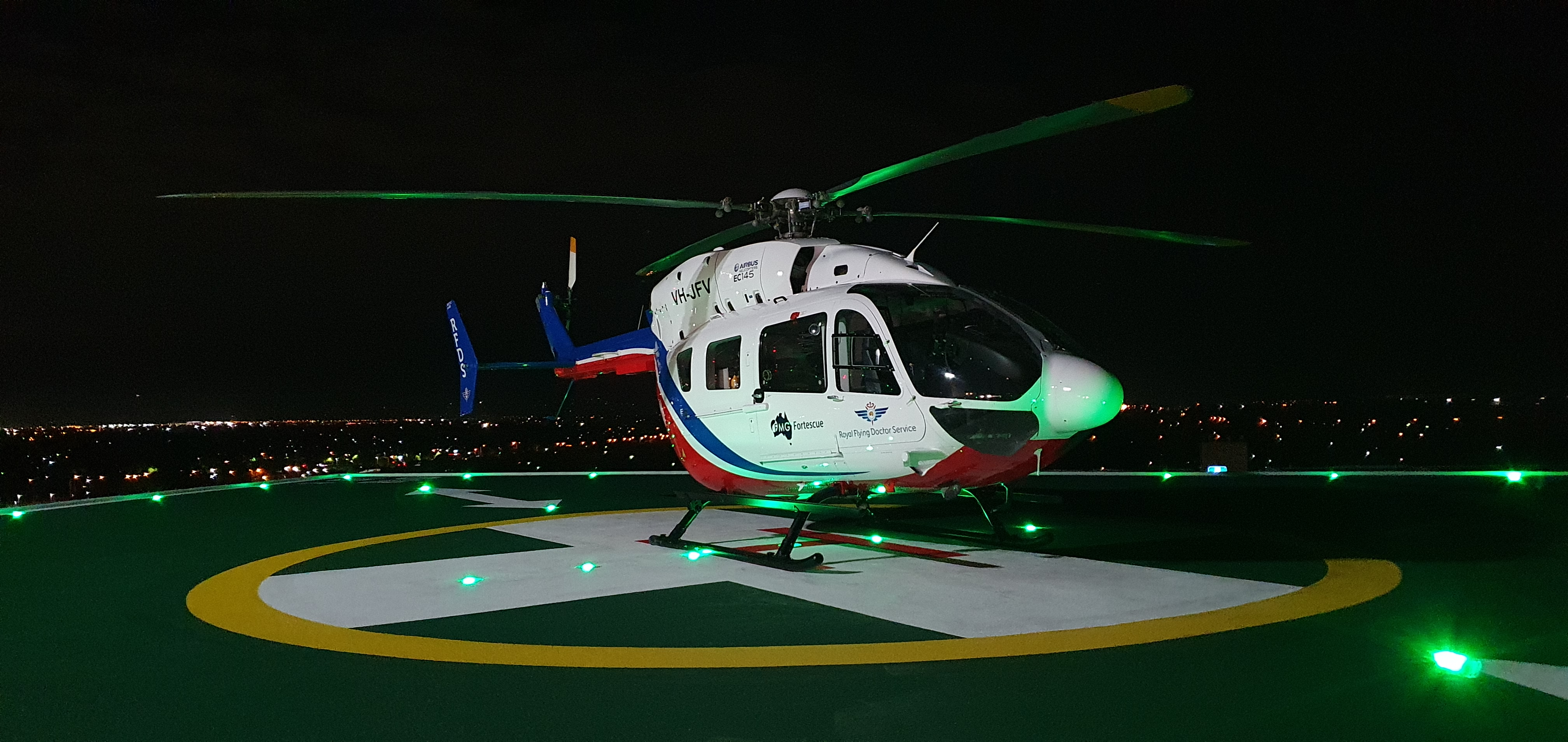
Airbus EC145

By 2021, the RFDS had received their 4 Pilatus PC-24 jets, replacing their Hawker 800XP jet. They are based at Jandakot Airport and Broome in WA and Adelaide SA. The PC-24 can fit 3 stretcher beds and two seated patients. The aircraft can cruise at 45,000 feet (14,000 m) and halves the time of flight compared to the existing propeller driven fleet. The PC-24 can also operate out of paved and unpaved runways.

In 2022, The Western Operations started operating its own helicopters. Two Airbus EC145 were imported from Germany and reconfigured at Jandakot Airport into hospital retrieval platforms. The aircraft are operated single pilot IFR with NVIS (NVG). The service provides retrievals up to 200 kilometres (120 mi) from Perth, landing in sports ovals or helipads. Patients are then flown directly to rooftop helipads located on all the major hospitals in Perth.

=== Medical retrieval equipment ===
The RFDS uses a wide range of contemporary emergency medical equipment to provide aeromedical retrieval services. These include transport ventilators, critical care monitors, infusion devices, point-of-care testing, portable diagnostic ultrasound and a range of other splints and devices.

=== Statistics ===
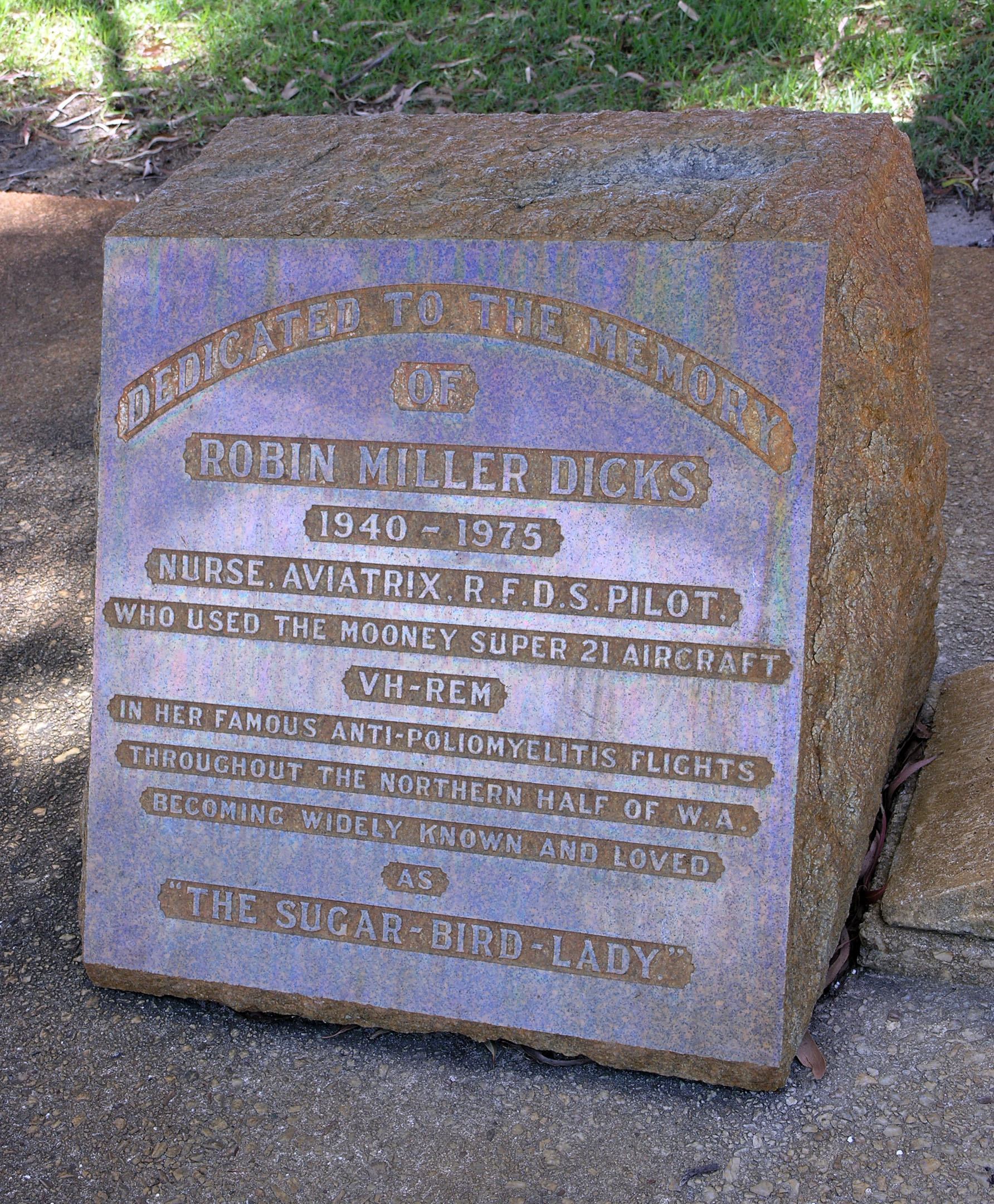
Memorial to RFDS pilot, Robin Miller Dicks, the "Sugarbird Lady" at Jandakot Airport

According to the RFDS of Australia 2015/16 Annual Report the service owns 67 aircraft, and operates 23 bases with 1,225 employees.

Each day, on average, the service:

- travels 73,554 kilometres by air
- performs 211 landings
- has 800 patient contacts (includes patients at clinics, patient transports and telehealth)
- transports 177 patients (includes primary evacuations, inter-hospital transfer, transports from clinics, repatriations and road transports by Victoria Mobile Patient Care Service)
- conducts 254 telehealth sessions.

=== School of the Air ===
The School of the Air, which links outback students with centralised teachers, until recently used the same radio equipment as the RFDS. This has been superseded with the availability of internet services.

== Notable people ==
Notable people associated with the RFDS include:

- Arthur Affleck, first pilot
- Marie Bashir, former NSW Governor, official patron
- Clyde Fenton, first doctor in the Northern Territory, also a pilot
- John Flynn, founder
- Wylie Gibbs, doctor
- Macarthur Job, pilot
- Silva McLeod, Tonga's first woman pilot, flew for the RFDS
- Robin Miller, nurse/pilot, "The Sugarbird Lady"
- John Grieve Woods, doctor

== Cultural references ==
- The service was depicted in the 1936 film The Flying Doctor
- The RFDS was the subject of the TV drama series The Flying Doctors. The series followed the lives of an RFDS crew based in a fictional township called "Coopers Crossing" (set in the real-life town of Minyip in north-western rural Victoria) and the members of the local population that they served.
- RFDS: Royal Flying Doctor Service is an Australian drama television series which centres around the lives of workers for the Royal Flying Doctors Service. It commenced airing on the Seven Network in 2021.
- In the 1950s the RFDS featured in a BBC Radio series The Flying Doctor, which became well known for the catchphrase "Flying Doctor calling Wollumboola Base". A television show of the same title based on this radio series and starring Richard Denning ran on the British ITV network for one season (1959–60).
- At the closing of Charlie Drake's humorous song "My Boomerang Won't Come Back", it is implied that the narrator accidentally downs a Flying Doctor plane with his boomerang.
- The Royal Flying Doctor Service of Australia is featured in the outback map of the video game Flight Control.
- The British space rock group Hawklords released a song called "Flying Doctor" on their album 25 Years On (1978). It describes an Australian flying doctor who has a drug cabinet key.
- In the television series Thomas & Friends, Season 22 introduces Isla, a plane in service to the RFDS, who is good friends with Shane, the Australian engine Thomas first met back in the special Thomas & Friends: The Great Race. The episode "Cyclone Thomas" has Isla shown flying to various medical emergencies with her on-board doctor, Dr. Claire, and attempting to help evacuate residents from a town threatened by a cyclone.
- Air Hawk and the Flying Doctors was a long-running cartoon that featured the service.

== Heritage listings ==
The First and Second Australian Inland Mission Hospitals in Birdsville are listed on the Queensland Heritage Register.

In 2009 as part of the Q150 celebrations, the Royal Flying Doctor Service was announced as one of the Q150 Icons of Queensland for its role as an iconic "innovation and invention".

In 2011 the Royal Flying Doctor Service of Australia (Queensland Section) was inducted into the Queensland Business Leaders Hall of Fame in recognition of its contribution to rural health and rural community building in Australia.

== See also ==
- Emergency Medical Retrieval Service (similar service in Scotland)
- Emergency medical services in Australia
- Air medical services
