= Harold Mair =

Australian politician

Harold David Mair, OAM (2 June 1919 – 7 September 2011) was an Australian politician. Mair was mayor of Albury from 1976 until 1977. In 1978, he was elected to the New South Wales Legislative Assembly as the member for Albury, representing the Labor Party. He was only the second Labor member ever to win Albury in the single-member era (since 1927), and to date the only Labor member to hold this traditionally conservative seat for more than one term.

In 1988 he lost his seat to the Liberal Party's Ian Glachan, who had been his opponent in 1984.

A footbridge constructed as part of the Hume Freeway project in Albury, which replaced the Dean Street Bridge, was named after Harold Mair.

Political offices
Preceded by Max Barry	Mayor of Albury; 1976–1977	Succeeded by John Roach
New South Wales Legislative Assembly
Preceded by Gordon Mackie	Member for Albury; 1978–1988	Succeeded by Ian Glachan
