= Electoral results for the district of Murray =

Election results for Murray, New South Wales, Australia

Murray, an electoral district of the Legislative Assembly in the Australian state of New South Wales, has had two incarnations, the first from 1859 to 1999, the second from 2015 to the present.

== Members ==
First incarnation (1859–1999)
| Election | Member | Party | | | | |
|---|---|---|---|---|---|---|
| 1859 | John Hay | None | | | | |
| 1860 | | None | | | | |
| 1864 | Robert Landale | None | | | | |
| 1869 | Patrick Jennings | None | | | | |
| 1872 | Patrick Jennings | None | | | | |
| 1872 by | William Hay | None | | | | |
| 1875 | William Hay | None | | | | |
| 1877 | Robert Barbour | None | Member | Party | | |
| 1880 | William Hay | None | Alexander Wilson | None | | |
| 1882–1887 | Robert Barbour | None | Alexander Wilson | None | | |
| 1882–1887 | Robert Barbour | None | John Chanter | None | | |
| 1885 | Robert Barbour | None | John Chanter | None | | |
| 1887 | Robert Barbour | Protectionist | John Chanter | Protectionist | | |
| 1889 | Robert Barbour | Protectionist | John Chanter | Protectionist | | |
| 1894 | James Hayes | Protectionist | | | | |
| 1895 | James Hayes | Protectionist | | | | |
| 1898 | James Hayes | Protectionist | | | | |
| 1901 | James Hayes | Progressive | | | | |
| 1904 | Robert Scobie | Labour | | | | |
| 1907 | Robert Scobie | Labour | | | | |
| 1910 | Robert Scobie | Labour | | | | |
| 1913 | Robert Scobie | Labour | | | | |
| 1917 | Robert Scobie | Nationalist | | | | |
| 1917 by | Brian Doe | Nationalist | Member | Party | Member | Party |
| 1920 | George Beeby | Progressive | William O'Brien | Labor | Richard Ball | Nationalist |
| 1920 apt | Matthew Kilpatrick | Progressive | William O'Brien | Labor | Richard Ball | Nationalist |
| 1922 | Matthew Kilpatrick | Progressive | William O'Brien | Labor | Richard Ball | Nationalist |
| 1925 | Matthew Kilpatrick | Country | Vern Goodin | Labor | Richard Ball | Nationalist |
| 1927 | Mat Davidson | Labor | | | | |
| 1930 | John Donovan | Labor | | | | |
| 1932 | Joe Lawson | Country | | | | |
| 1935 | Joe Lawson | Country | | | | |
| 1938 | Joe Lawson | Country | | | | |
| 1941 | Joe Lawson | Country | | | | |
| 1944 | Joe Lawson | Country | | | | |
| 1947 | Joe Lawson | Country | | | | |
| 1950 | Joe Lawson | Country | | | | |
| 1953 | Joe Lawson | Country | | | | |
| 1956 | Joe Lawson | Country | | | | |
| 1959 | Joe Lawson | Country | | | | |
| 1962 | Joe Lawson | Country | | | | |
| 1965 | Joe Lawson | Country | | | | |
| 1968 | Joe Lawson | Independent | | | | |
| 1971 | Joe Lawson | Independent | | | | |
| 1973 by | Mary Meillon | Liberal | | | | |
| 1973 | Mary Meillon | Liberal | | | | |
| 1976 | Mary Meillon | Liberal | | | | |
| 1978 | Mary Meillon | Liberal | | | | |
| 1980 by | Tim Fischer | National | | | | |
| 1981 | Tim Fischer | National | | | | |
| 1984 | Tim Fischer | National | | | | |
| 1985 by | Jim Small | National | | | | |
| 1988 | Jim Small | National | | | | |
| 1991 | Jim Small | National | | | | |
| 1995 | Jim Small | National | | | | |
Second incarnation (2015–present)
| Election | Member | Party | | | | |
| 2015 | Adrian Piccoli | National | | | | |
| 2017 by | Austin Evans | National | | | | |
| 2019 | Helen Dalton | Shooters, Fishers, Farmers | | | | |
| 2023 | Helen Dalton | Independent | | | | |

== Election results ==
=== Elections in the 2020s ===
==== 2023 ====
2023 New South Wales state election: Murray
| Party | Candidate | Votes | % | ±% |
|---|---|---|---|---|
| Independent | Helen Dalton | 24,824 | 50.2 | +50.2 |
| National | Peta Betts | 12,974 | 26.3 | −8.4 |
| Labor | Max Buljubasic | 4,124 | 8.3 | −0.7 |
| Shooters, Fishers, Farmers | Desiree Gregory | 2,369 | 4.8 | −33.3 |
| Legalise Cannabis | Adrian Carle | 1,840 | 3.7 | +3.7 |
| Ind. Riverina State | David Landini | 1,207 | 2.4 | +0.3 |
| Greens | Amelia King | 913 | 1.8 | −0.8 |
| Public Education | Kevin Farrell | 446 | 0.9 | +0.9 |
| Sustainable Australia | Michael Florance | 404 | 0.8 | −0.3 |
| Independent | Greg Adamson | 314 | 0.6 | +0.6 |
| Total formal votes | | 49,415 | 96.8 | +0.7 |
| Informal votes | | 1,631 | 3.2 | −0.7 |
| Turnout | | 51,046 | 86.3 | −1.8 |
Notional two-party-preferred count
| National | Peta Betts | 17,003 | 72.1 | −2.7 |
| Labor | Max Buljubasic | 6,570 | 27.9 | +2.7 |
Two-candidate-preferred result
| Independent | Helen Dalton | 27,260 | 66.0 | +66.0 |
| National | Peta Betts | 14,035 | 34.0 | −13.2 |
| Member changed to Independent from Shooters, Fishers, Farmers | | | | |

=== Elections in the 2010s ===
==== 2019 ====
2019 New South Wales state election: Murray
| Party | Candidate | Votes | % | ±% |
|---|---|---|---|---|
| Shooters, Fishers, Farmers | Helen Dalton | 18,305 | 38.75 | +38.75 |
| National | Austin Evans | 16,636 | 35.22 | −20.28 |
| Labor | Alan Purtill | 4,134 | 8.75 | −7.43 |
| One Nation | Tom Weyrich | 3,949 | 8.36 | +8.36 |
| Greens | Nivanka De Silva | 1,238 | 2.62 | +0.39 |
| Ind. Riverina State | David Landini | 976 | 2.07 | +2.07 |
| Christian Democrats | Philip Langfield | 715 | 1.51 | +0.11 |
| Independent | Brian Mills | 633 | 1.34 | −2.42 |
| Sustainable Australia | Carl Kendall | 455 | 0.96 | +0.96 |
| Keep Sydney Open | Liam Davies | 192 | 0.41 | +0.41 |
| Total formal votes | | 47,233 | 96.15 | −0.11 |
| Informal votes | | 1,889 | 3.85 | +0.11 |
| Turnout | | 49,122 | 88.06 | +0.56 |
Two-party-preferred result
| National | Austin Evans | 20,029 | 74.91 | −0.29 |
| Labor | Alan Purtill | 6,707 | 25.09 | +0.29 |
Two-candidate-preferred result
| Shooters, Fishers, Farmers | Helen Dalton | 20,765 | 53.54 | +53.54 |
| National | Austin Evans | 18,020 | 46.46 | −26.19 |
| Shooters, Fishers, Farmers gain from National | | | | |

==== 2017 by-election ====
2017 Murray by-election Saturday 14 October
| Party | Candidate | Votes | % | ±% |
|---|---|---|---|---|
| National | Austin Evans | 18,548 | 40.7 | −14.8 |
| Shooters, Fishers, Farmers | Helen Dalton | 14,332 | 31.5 | +31.5 |
| Labor | Michael Kidd | 9,324 | 20.5 | +4.3 |
| Independent | Brian Mills | 1,363 | 3.0 | −0.8 |
| Independent | Peter Robinson | 1,072 | 2.4 | +2.4 |
| Greens | Ray Goodlass | 912 | 2.0 | −0.2 |
| Total formal votes | | 45,551 | 96.9 | +0.6 |
| Informal votes | | 1,466 | 3.1 | −0.6 |
| Turnout | | 47,017 | 84.0 | −3.5 |
Two-candidate-preferred result
| National | Austin Evans | 21,237 | 53.3 | −19.3 |
| Shooters, Fishers, Farmers | Helen Dalton | 18,570 | 46.7 | +46.7 |
| National hold | | Swing | –19.3 | |

Adrian Piccoli (National) resigned.

==== 2015 ====
2015 New South Wales state election: Murray
| Party | Candidate | Votes | % | ±% |
|---|---|---|---|---|
| National | Adrian Piccoli | 25,752 | 55.5 | −22.3 |
| Independent Country | Helen Dalton | 8,440 | 18.2 | +18.2 |
| Labor | Max Buljubasic | 7,509 | 16.2 | −1.3 |
| Independent | Brian Mills | 1,745 | 3.8 | +3.8 |
| Greens | Jordanna Glassman | 1,035 | 2.2 | −1.1 |
| No Land Tax | Garry Codemo | 929 | 2.0 | +2.0 |
| Christian Democrats | David Elder | 651 | 1.4 | +0.0 |
| Independent | Atul Misra | 337 | 0.7 | +0.7 |
| Total formal votes | | 46,398 | 96.3 | −0.5 |
| Informal votes | | 1,801 | 3.7 | +0.5 |
| Turnout | | 48,199 | 87.5 | −3.7 |
Notional two-party-preferred count
| National | Adrian Piccoli | 28,295 | 75.2 | −5.7 |
| Labor | Max Buljubasic | 9,329 | 24.8 | +5.7 |
Two-candidate-preferred result
| National | Adrian Piccoli | 27,504 | 72.7 | −8.3 |
| Independent Country | Helen Dalton | 10,353 | 27.3 | +27.3 |
| National notional hold | | Swing | −8.3 | |

Muray was a new seat combining most of the abolished district of Murrumbidgee and the southern part of the abolished district of Murray-Darling. Adrian Piccoli (National) was the member for Murrumbidgee and the member for Murray-Darling, John Williams (National), was an unsuccessful candidate at the election for the Legislative Council.

District recreated

==== 1999–2015 ====
District abolished

=== Elections in the 1990s ===
==== 1995 ====
1995 New South Wales state election: Murray
| Party | Candidate | Votes | % | ±% |
|---|---|---|---|---|
| National | Jim Small | 24,495 | 77.6 | +3.2 |
| Labor | Peter Hargreaves | 7,061 | 22.4 | +6.2 |
| Total formal votes | | 31,556 | 93.0 | −1.6 |
| Informal votes | | 2,371 | 7.0 | +1.6 |
| Turnout | | 33,927 | 89.6 | |
| National hold | | Swing | −3.8 | |

==== 1991 ====
1991 New South Wales state election: Murray
| Party | Candidate | Votes | % | ±% |
|---|---|---|---|---|
| National | Jim Small | 23,272 | 74.4 | −1.1 |
| Labor | Mark Kilby | 5,048 | 16.1 | −7.9 |
| Democrats | Bernard Gee | 1,251 | 4.0 | +4.0 |
| Independent | James Hayes | 1,187 | 3.8 | +3.8 |
| Citizens Electoral Council | Edward Harvey | 506 | 1.6 | +1.6 |
| Total formal votes | | 31,264 | 94.6 | −3.4 |
| Informal votes | | 1,771 | 5.4 | +3.4 |
| Turnout | | 33,035 | 90.5 | |
Two-party-preferred result
| National | Jim Small | 23,999 | 81.4 | +5.5 |
| Labor | Mark Kilby | 5,490 | 18.6 | −5.5 |
| National hold | | Swing | +5.5 | |

=== Elections in the 1980s ===
==== 1988 ====
1988 New South Wales state election: Murray
| Party | Candidate | Votes | % | ±% |
|---|---|---|---|---|
| National | Jim Small | 22,205 | 77.0 | +9.1 |
| Labor | Bernard Kelly | 6,626 | 23.0 | −0.3 |
| Total formal votes | | 28,831 | 98.1 | −0.4 |
| Informal votes | | 570 | 1.9 | +0.4 |
| Turnout | | 29,401 | 89.4 | |
| National hold | | Swing | +4.3 | |

==== 1985 by-election ====
1985 Murray by-election Saturday 2 February
| Party | Candidate | Votes | % | ±% |
|---|---|---|---|---|
| National | Jim Small | 16,678 | 63.0 | −5.0 |
| Independent | Ray Brooks | 9,813 | 37.0 | +13.7 |
| Total formal votes | | 26,491 | 97.5 | −1.0 |
| Informal votes | | 677 | 2.5 | +1.0 |
| Turnout | | 27,168 | 82.1 | −6.5 |
| National hold | | Swing | −5.0 | |

National party member Tim Fischer resigned to successfully contest the seat of Farrer at the 1984 federal election.

==== 1984 ====
1984 New South Wales state election: Murray
| Party | Candidate | Votes | % | ±% |
|---|---|---|---|---|
| National | Tim Fischer | 19,144 | 67.9 | +0.9 |
| Labor | Michael Anthony | 6,584 | 23.4 | −4.7 |
| Independent | John Murphy | 1,721 | 6.1 | +6.1 |
| Democrats | Gregory Butler | 732 | 2.6 | −2.3 |
| Total formal votes | | 28,181 | 98.5 | +0.2 |
| Informal votes | | 432 | 1.5 | −0.2 |
| Turnout | | 28,613 | 88.7 | +1.1 |
Two-party-preferred result
| National | Tim Fischer | | 72.6 | +3.5 |
| Labor | Michael Anthony | | 27.4 | −3.5 |
| National hold | | Swing | +3.5 | |

==== 1981 ====
1981 New South Wales state election: Murray
| Party | Candidate | Votes | % | ±% |
|---|---|---|---|---|
| National Country | Tim Fischer | 17,765 | 67.0 | +67.0 |
| Labor | Robert Allen | 7,447 | 28.1 | +3.4 |
| Democrats | Gregory Butler | 1,300 | 4.9 | +4.9 |
| Total formal votes | | 26,512 | 98.3 | |
| Informal votes | | 445 | 1.7 | |
| Turnout | | 26,957 | 87.6 | |
Two-party-preferred result
| National Country | Tim Fischer | 17,965 | 69.1 | +5.0 |
| Labor | Robert Allen | 8,047 | 30.9 | −5.0 |
| National Country gain from Liberal | | Swing | N/A | |

==== 1980 by-election ====
1980 Murray by-election Saturday 13 September
| Party | Candidate | Votes | % | ±% |
|---|---|---|---|---|
| Country | Tim Fischer | 8,496 | 45.4 | |
| Labor | Robert Allen | 5,804 | 31.0 | +6.3 |
| Liberal | Bill Hazelton | 4,435 | 23.7 | −19.7 |
| Total formal votes | | 18,735 | 98.5 | |
| Informal votes | | 289 | 1.5 | |
| Turnout | | 19,024 | 83.3 | |
Two-party-preferred result
| Country | Tim Fischer | 12,396 | 67.0 | |
| Labor | Robert Allen | 6,119 | 33.1 | −6.8 |
| Country gain from Liberal | | Swing | | |

Mary Meillon (Liberal) died..

=== Elections in the 1970s ===
==== 1978 ====
1978 New South Wales state election: Murray
| Party | Candidate | Votes | % | ±% |
|---|---|---|---|---|
| Liberal | Mary Meillon | 8,228 | 43.4 | +4.6 |
| Labor | Brian Oates | 4,675 | 24.7 | −1.1 |
| Independent | Gregory Graham | 4,277 | 22.7 | −1.4 |
| Labor | Robert Allen | 1,762 | 9.3 | +9.3 |
| Total formal votes | | 18,964 | 97.6 | −1.1 |
| Informal votes | | 467 | 2.4 | +1.1 |
| Turnout | | 19,431 | 88.0 | −1.2 |
Two-party-preferred result
| Liberal | Mary Meillon | 11,396 | 60.1 | −2.5 |
| Labor | Brian Oates | 7,568 | 39.9 | +39.9 |
| Liberal hold | | Swing | −2.5 | |

==== 1976 ====
1976 New South Wales state election: Murray
| Party | Candidate | Votes | % | ±% |
|---|---|---|---|---|
| Liberal | Mary Meillon | 7,234 | 38.8 | +5.5 |
| Labor | Ross Boyd | 4,804 | 25.8 | +2.2 |
| Independent | Gregory Graham | 4,479 | 24.1 | +18.0 |
| Independent | Ian Fleming | 2,102 | 11.3 | +11.3 |
| Total formal votes | | 18,619 | 98.7 | +2.3 |
| Informal votes | | 236 | 1.3 | −2.3 |
| Turnout | | 18,855 | 89.2 | −0.3 |
Two-candidate-preferred result
| Liberal | Mary Meillon | 11,663 | 62.6 | +9.9 |
| Independent | Gregory Graham | 6,956 | 37.4 | +37.4 |
| Liberal hold | | Swing | +9.9 | |

==== 1973 ====
1973 New South Wales state election: Murray
| Party | Candidate | Votes | % | ±% |
|---|---|---|---|---|
| Independent | Bruce Jeffery | 5,942 | 34.6 | +34.6 |
| Liberal | Mary Meillon | 5,723 | 33.3 | +19.0 |
| Labor | Douglas Drew | 4,045 | 23.6 | +23.6 |
| Independent | Gregory Graham | 1,041 | 6.1 | +6.1 |
| Democratic Labor | Brian Maw | 351 | 2.0 | −6.3 |
| Independent | Kevin Lowndes | 62 | 0.4 | +0.4 |
| Total formal votes | | 17,164 | 96.4 | |
| Informal votes | | 647 | 3.6 | |
| Turnout | | 17,811 | 89.5 | |
Two-party-preferred result
| Liberal | Mary Meillon | 11,980 | 69.8 | |
| Labor | Douglas Drew | 5,184 | 30.2 | |
Two-candidate-preferred result
| Liberal | Mary Meillon | 9,044 | 52.7 | +52.7 |
| Independent | Bruce Jeffery | 8,120 | 47.3 | +47.3 |
| Liberal gain from Independent | | Swing | N/A | |

==== 1973 by-election ====
1973 Murray by-election Saturday 6 October
| Party | Candidate | Votes | % | ±% |
|---|---|---|---|---|
| Country | Bruce Jeffery | 6,663 | 39.96 | +8.77 |
| Liberal | Mary Meillon | 5,661 | 33.95 | +19.68 |
| Labor | Douglas Drew | 4,351 | 26.09 | +26.09 |
| Total formal votes | | 16,675 | 98.6 | +1.6 |
| Informal votes | | 236 | 1.4 | −1.6 |
| Turnout | | 16,911 | 85.0 | −5.6 |
Two-party-preferred result
| Liberal | Mary Meillon | 8,335 | 51.15 | +51.15 |
| Country | Bruce Jeffery | 8,145 | 48.85 | −0.57 |
| Liberal gain from Independent | | Swing | | |

Joe Lawson (Independent) died.

==== 1971 ====
1971 New South Wales state election: Murray
| Party | Candidate | Votes | % | ±% |
|---|---|---|---|---|
| Independent | Joe Lawson | 7,452 | 46.2 | +13.5 |
| Country | Bruce Birrell | 5,026 | 31.2 | +14.9 |
| Liberal | Allan Connell | 2,299 | 14.3 | +5.5 |
| Democratic Labor | Brian Maw | 1,339 | 8.3 | +3.9 |
| Total formal votes | | 16,116 | 97.0 | |
| Informal votes | | 496 | 3.0 | |
| Turnout | | 16,612 | 90.6 | |
Two-candidate-preferred result
| Independent | Joe Lawson | 8,335 | 51.7 | −7.8 |
| Country | Bruce Birrell | 7,781 | 48.3 | +7.8 |
| Independent hold | | Swing | −7.8 | |

=== Elections in the 1960s ===
==== 1968 ====
1968 New South Wales state election: Murray
| Party | Candidate | Votes | % | ±% |
|---|---|---|---|---|
| Independent | Joe Lawson | 6,326 | 32.7 | +32.7 |
| Labor | Henry O'Callaghan | 4,676 | 24.2 | −2.4 |
| Country | Bruce Birrell | 3,156 | 16.3 | −57.1 |
| Country | Donald Kendell | 2,643 | 13.7 | +13.7 |
| Liberal | Michael Butler | 1,710 | 8.8 | +8.8 |
| Democratic Labor | Victor Groutsch | 847 | 4.4 | +4.4 |
| Total formal votes | | 19,358 | 96.9 | |
| Informal votes | | 609 | 3.1 | |
| Turnout | | 19,967 | 91.7 | |
Two-candidate-preferred result
| Independent | Joe Lawson | 11,521 | 59.5 | +59.5 |
| Country | Bruce Birrell | 7,837 | 40.5 | −32.9 |
| Member changed to Independent from Country | | Swing | | |

==== 1965 ====
1965 New South Wales state election: Murray
| Party | Candidate | Votes | % | ±% |
|---|---|---|---|---|
| Country | Joe Lawson | 13,378 | 73.4 | +7.3 |
| Labor | George Xeros | 4,839 | 26.6 | −7.3 |
| Total formal votes | | 18,217 | 99.1 | −0.2 |
| Informal votes | | 163 | 0.9 | +0.2 |
| Turnout | | 18,380 | 92.2 | +1.3 |
| Country hold | | Swing | +7.3 | |

==== 1962 ====
1962 New South Wales state election: Murray
| Party | Candidate | Votes | % | ±% |
|---|---|---|---|---|
| Country | Joe Lawson | 11,764 | 66.1 | +1.5 |
| Labor | John Hayes | 6,034 | 33.9 | −1.5 |
| Total formal votes | | 17,798 | 99.3 | |
| Informal votes | | 132 | 0.7 | |
| Turnout | | 17,930 | 90.9 | |
| Country hold | | Swing | +1.5 | |

=== Elections in the 1950s ===
==== 1959 ====
1959 New South Wales state election: Murray
| Party | Candidate | Votes | % | ±% |
|---|---|---|---|---|
| Country | Joe Lawson | 11,555 | 64.6 | |
| Labor | John Hayes | 6,334 | 35.4 | |
| Total formal votes | | 17,889 | 99.1 | |
| Informal votes | | 154 | 0.9 | |
| Turnout | | 18,043 | 90.7 | |
| Country hold | | Swing | | |

==== 1956 ====
1956 New South Wales state election: Murray
| Party | Candidate | Votes | % | ±% |
|---|---|---|---|---|
| Country | Joe Lawson | 12,106 | 70.1 | +11.9 |
| Labor | Willie Peters | 5,164 | 29.9 | −11.9 |
| Total formal votes | | 17,270 | 99.3 | +0.7 |
| Informal votes | | 122 | 0.7 | −0.7 |
| Turnout | | 17,392 | 86.8 | −2.4 |
| Country hold | | Swing | +11.9 | |

==== 1953 ====
1953 New South Wales state election: Murray
| Party | Candidate | Votes | % | ±% |
|---|---|---|---|---|
| Country | Joe Lawson | 9,593 | 58.2 | |
| Labor | Francis Holden | 6,877 | 41.8 | |
| Total formal votes | | 16,470 | 98.6 | |
| Informal votes | | 239 | 1.4 | |
| Turnout | | 16,709 | 89.2 | |
| Country hold | | Swing | | |

==== 1950 ====
1950 New South Wales state election: Murray
| Party | Candidate | Votes | % | ±% |
|---|---|---|---|---|
| Country | Joe Lawson | 6,067 | 36.7 | |
| Labor | James Flood | 5,245 | 31.7 | |
| Country | Ebenezer Kendell | 5,222 | 31.6 | |
| Total formal votes | | 16,534 | 99.1 | |
| Informal votes | | 143 | 0.9 | |
| Turnout | | 16,677 | 91.8 | |
Two-party-preferred result
| Country | Joe Lawson | 10,739 | 64.9 | |
| Labor | James Flood | 5,795 | 35.1 | |
| Country hold | | Swing | | |

=== Elections in the 1940s ===
==== 1947 ====
1947 New South Wales state election: Murray
| Party | Candidate | Votes | % | ±% |
|---|---|---|---|---|
| Country | Joe Lawson | 6,763 | 61.7 | +4.6 |
| Labor | James Flood | 4,198 | 38.3 | −4.6 |
| Total formal votes | | 10,961 | 99.4 | +1.3 |
| Informal votes | | 65 | 0.6 | −1.3 |
| Turnout | | 11,026 | 89.5 | +0.6 |
| Country hold | | Swing | +4.6 | |

==== 1944 ====
1944 New South Wales state election: Murray
| Party | Candidate | Votes | % | ±% |
|---|---|---|---|---|
| Country | Joe Lawson | 6,053 | 57.1 | +3.3 |
| Labor | James Flood | 4,540 | 42.9 | −3.3 |
| Total formal votes | | 10,593 | 98.1 | −0.6 |
| Informal votes | | 205 | 1.9 | +0.6 |
| Turnout | | 10,798 | 88.9 | +5.6 |
| Country hold | | Swing | +3.3 | |

==== 1941 ====
1941 New South Wales state election: Murray
| Party | Candidate | Votes | % | ±% |
|---|---|---|---|---|
| Country | Joe Lawson | 6,054 | 53.8 | |
| Labor | James Lloyd | 5,203 | 46.2 | |
| Total formal votes | | 11,257 | 98.7 | |
| Informal votes | | 144 | 1.3 | |
| Turnout | | 11,401 | 83.3 | |
| Country hold | | Swing | | |

=== Elections in the 1930s ===
==== 1938 ====
1938 New South Wales state election: Murray
| Party | Candidate | Votes | % | ±% |
|---|---|---|---|---|
| Country | Joe Lawson | 7,520 | 60.7 | +9.7 |
| Labor | James Lloyd | 4,875 | 39.3 | −9.7 |
| Total formal votes | | 12,395 | 97.8 | −0.8 |
| Informal votes | | 281 | 2.2 | +0.8 |
| Turnout | | 12,676 | 90.2 | −0.2 |
| Country hold | | Swing | +9.7 | |

==== 1935 ====
1935 New South Wales state election: Murray
| Party | Candidate | Votes | % | ±% |
|---|---|---|---|---|
| Country | Joe Lawson | 6,510 | 51.0 | +4.6 |
| Labor (NSW) | John Donovan | 6,263 | 49.0 | +8.4 |
| Total formal votes | | 12,773 | 98.6 | +0.7 |
| Informal votes | | 175 | 1.4 | −0.7 |
| Turnout | | 12,948 | 90.4 | −3.3 |
| Country hold | | Swing | −6.2 | |

==== 1932 ====
1932 New South Wales state election: Murray
| Party | Candidate | Votes | % | ±% |
|---|---|---|---|---|
| Country | Joe Lawson | 5,269 | 46.4 | +14.4 |
| Labor (NSW) | John Donovan | 4,602 | 40.6 | −8.3 |
| United Australia | John Dowling | 1,473 | 13.0 | +13.0 |
| Total formal votes | | 11,344 | 97.9 | +1.4 |
| Informal votes | | 237 | 2.1 | −1.4 |
| Turnout | | 11,581 | 93.7 | +1.1 |
Two-party-preferred result
| Country | Joe Lawson | 6,491 | 57.2 | +7.8 |
| Labor (NSW) | John Donovan | 4,853 | 42.8 | −7.8 |
| Country gain from Labor (NSW) | | Swing | +7.8 | |

==== 1930 ====
1930 New South Wales state election: Murray
| Party | Candidate | Votes | % | ±% |
|---|---|---|---|---|
| Labor | John Donovan | 5,299 | 48.9 | |
| Country | Joe Lawson | 3,468 | 32.0 | |
| Country | Frederick Grabau | 2,064 | 19.1 | |
| Total formal votes | | 10,831 | 96.5 | |
| Informal votes | | 395 | 3.5 | |
| Turnout | | 11,226 | 92.6 | |
Two-party-preferred result
| Labor | John Donovan | 5,476 | 50.6 | |
| Country | Joe Lawson | 5,355 | 49.4 | |
| Labor gain from Country | | Swing | | |

The sitting member for Murray, Mat Davidson (Labor) successfully contested Cobar.

=== Elections in the 1920s ===
==== 1927 ====
1927 New South Wales state election: Murray
| Party | Candidate | Votes | % | ±% |
|---|---|---|---|---|
| Labor | Mat Davidson | 5,855 | 52.3 | |
| Nationalist | John Dowling | 5,341 | 47.7 | |
| Total formal votes | | 11,196 | 98.5 | |
| Informal votes | | 171 | 1.5 | |
| Turnout | | 11,367 | 76.3 | |
| Labor win | | (new seat) | | |

==== 1925 ====
1925 New South Wales state election: Murray
| Party | Candidate | Votes | % | ±% |
|---|---|---|---|---|
| Quota | | 6,138 | | |
| Labor | Vern Goodin (elected 3) | 4,708 | 19.2 | +19.2 |
| Labor | William O'Brien | 3,711 | 15.1 | −10.2 |
| Labor | George Bodkin | 2,972 | 12.1 | +12.1 |
| Nationalist | Richard Ball (elected 1) | 8,274 | 33.7 | +1.5 |
| Nationalist | Joseph Niesigh | 167 | 0.7 | +0.7 |
| Progressive | Matthew Kilpatrick (elected 2) | 4,037 | 16.4 | +4.0 |
| Progressive | Charles Coghlan | 498 | 2.0 | +2.0 |
| Progressive | Olave Olsen | 184 | 0.8 | +0.8 |
| Total formal votes | | 24,551 | 95.3 | −0.5 |
| Informal votes | | 1,200 | 4.7 | +0.5 |
| Turnout | | 25,751 | 60.4 | −4.8 |
Party total votes
| Labor | | 11,391 | 46.4 | +5.2 |
| Nationalist | | 8,441 | 34.4 | −6.9 |
| Progressive | | 4,719 | 19.2 | +1.7 |

==== 1922 ====
1922 New South Wales state election: Murray
| Party | Candidate | Votes | % | ±% |
|---|---|---|---|---|
| Quota | | 6,162 | | |
| Nationalist | Richard Ball (elected 1) | 7,933 | 32.2 | +12.3 |
| Nationalist | Edward Collins | 1,895 | 7.7 | +7.7 |
| Nationalist | John Jelbart | 342 | 1.4 | +1.4 |
| Labor | William O'Brien (elected 2) | 6,343 | 25.7 | +1.3 |
| Labor | Patrick Quilty | 2,137 | 8.7 | +8.7 |
| Labor | Walter Boston | 1,674 | 6.8 | +6.8 |
| Progressive | Matthew Kilpatrick (elected 3) | 3,043 | 12.3 | +8.6 |
| Progressive | Ernest Field | 738 | 3.0 | +3.0 |
| Progressive | John Smithenbecker | 539 | 2.2 | +2.2 |
| Total formal votes | | 24,644 | 95.8 | +2.1 |
| Informal votes | | 1,092 | 4.2 | −2.1 |
| Turnout | | 25,736 | 65.2 | +9.3 |
Party total votes
| Nationalist | | 10,170 | 41.3 | +10.1 |
| Labor | | 10,154 | 41.2 | −4.7 |
| Progressive | | 4,320 | 17.5 | −5.4 |

==== 1920 appointment ====
On 9 August 1920 George Beeby resigned to accept appointment as a judge of the Court of Industrial Arbitration and president of the Board of Trade. Between 1920 and 1927 the Legislative Assembly was elected using a form of proportional representation with multi-member seats and a single transferable vote (modified Hare-Clark). There was confusion at the time as to the process to be used to fill the vacancy. In accordance with the practice prior to 1920, the Speaker of the Legislative Assembly issued a writ of election requiring a by-election to be conducted, however the Chief Electoral Officer said he couldn't do so under then law at the time and that a by-election would be contrary to the principle of proportional representation. The vacancy was left unfilled until the Parliament passed the Parliamentary Elections (Casual Vacancies) Act on 10 December 1920, so that casual vacancies were filled by the next unsuccessful candidate on the incumbent member's party list. Matthew Kilpatrick was the unsuccessful Progressive candidate at the 1920 election and took his seat on 15 December 1920.

==== 1920 ====
1920 New South Wales state election: Murray
| Party | Candidate | Votes | % | ±% |
|---|---|---|---|---|
| Quota | | 4,959 | | |
| Labor | William O'Brien (elected 1) | 4,833 | 24.4 | |
| Labor | Edmund Clear | 3,590 | 18.1 | |
| Labor | Claude Thompson | 676 | 3.4 | |
| Nationalist | Richard Ball (elected 2) | 3,957 | 19.9 | |
| Nationalist | Arthur Manning (defeated) | 2,224 | 11.2 | |
| Progressive | George Beeby (elected 3) | 3,810 | 19.2 | |
| Progressive | Matthew Kilpatrick | 742 | 3.7 | |
| Total formal votes | | 19,832 | 93.7 | |
| Informal votes | | 1,326 | 6.3 | |
| Turnout | | 21,158 | 55.9 | |
Party total votes
| Labor | | 9,099 | 45.9 | |
| Nationalist | | 6,181 | 31.2 | |
| Progressive | | 4,552 | 23.0 | |

=== Elections in the 1910s ===
==== 1917 by-election ====
1917 Murray by-election Saturday 22 September
| Party | Candidate | Votes | % | ±% |
|---|---|---|---|---|
| Nationalist | Brian Doe | 3,041 | 58.6 | 0.0 |
| Labor | Richard O'Halloran | 2,147 | 41.4 | +1.1 |
| Total formal votes | | 5,188 | 100.0 | +1.1 |
| Informal votes | | 0 | | −1.1 |
| Turnout | | 5,188 | 53.6 (Note: based on an electoral roll of 9,672 at the 1917 state election.) | +1.5 |
| Nationalist hold | | Swing | 0.0 | |

Robert Scobie (Nationalist) died.

==== 1917 ====
1917 New South Wales state election: Murray
| Party | Candidate | Votes | % | ±% |
|---|---|---|---|---|
| Nationalist | Robert Scobie | 2,926 | 58.6 | +13.8 |
| Labor | Richard O'Halloran | 2,010 | 40.3 | −14.9 |
| Independent | Patrick Duffy | 55 | 1.1 | +1.1 |
| Total formal votes | | 4,991 | 98.9 | +1.0 |
| Informal votes | | 56 | 1.1 | −1.0 |
| Turnout | | 5,047 | 52.2 | −1.0 |
| Member changed to Nationalist from Labor | | | | |

The sitting member Robert Scobie was expelled from Labor in the November 1916 Labor split over conscription.

==== 1913 ====
1913 New South Wales state election: Murray
| Party | Candidate | Votes | % | ±% |
|---|---|---|---|---|
| Labor | Robert Scobie | 3,035 | 55.2 | |
| Liberal Reform | Robert Gibson (Note: Also endorsed by Farmers and Settlers.) | 2,463 | 44.8 | |
| Total formal votes | | 5,498 | 97.9 | |
| Informal votes | | 118 | 2.1 | |
| Turnout | | 5,616 | 53.2 | |
| Labor hold | | | | |

==== 1910 ====
1910 New South Wales state election: The Murray
| Party | Candidate | Votes | % | ±% |
|---|---|---|---|---|
| Labour | Robert Scobie | Unopposed | | |
| Labour hold | | | | |

=== Elections in the 1900s ===
==== 1907 ====
1907 New South Wales state election: The Murray
| Party | Candidate | Votes | % | ±% |
|---|---|---|---|---|
| Labour | Robert Scobie | 2,041 | 63.6 | |
| Liberal Reform | Frank Byrne | 1,168 | 36.4 | |
| Total formal votes | | 3,209 | 96.8 | |
| Informal votes | | 105 | 3.2 | |
| Turnout | | 3,314 | 48.6 | |
| Labour hold | | | | |

==== 1904 ====
1904 New South Wales state election: The Murray
| Party | Candidate | Votes | % | ±% |
|---|---|---|---|---|
| Labour | Robert Scobie | 1,936 | 58.3 | |
| Independent Liberal | Robert Gibson | 1,385 | 41.7 | |
| Total formal votes | | 3,321 | 98.6 | |
| Informal votes | | 49 | 1.5 | |
| Turnout | | 3,370 | 50.5 | |
| Labour win | | (new seat) | | |

The Murray electorate retained nothing but the name, the former district being divided between Corowa and Deniliquin. The member for The Murray was James Hayes (Progressive) who was appointed to the Legislative Council and did not contest the election. The district re-created in 1904 consisted of the abolished seat of Wentworth and parts of The Lachlan and the abolished seat of Hay. The member for Wentworth was Robert Scobie (Labour). The member for The Lachlan was James Carroll (Progressive) who unsuccessfully contested that seat. The member for Hay was Frank Byrne who did not contest the election.

==== 1901 ====
1901 New South Wales state election: The Murray
| Party | Candidate | Votes | % | ±% |
|---|---|---|---|---|
| Progressive | James Hayes | 885 | 59.3 | |
| Independent Liberal | Alexander McArthur | 607 | 40.7 | |
| Total formal votes | | 1,492 | 98.2 | |
| Informal votes | | 27 | 1.8 | |
| Turnout | | 1,519 | 49.2 | |
| Progressive hold | | | | |

=== Elections in the 1890s ===
==== 1898 ====
This section is an excerpt from 1898 New South Wales colonial election § The Murray

1898 New South Wales colonial election: The Murray
| Party | Candidate | Votes | % | ±% |
|---|---|---|---|---|
| National Federal | James Hayes | unopposed | | |
| National Federal hold | | | | |

==== 1895 ====
This section is an excerpt from 1895 New South Wales colonial election § The Murray

1895 New South Wales colonial election: The Murray
| Party | Candidate | Votes | % | ±% |
|---|---|---|---|---|
| Protectionist | James Hayes | 661 | 60.0 | |
| Free Trade | Hugh Bridson | 408 | 37.1 | |
| Ind. Protectionist | David Fealy | 32 | 2.9 | |
| Total formal votes | | 1,101 | 97.4 | |
| Informal votes | | 30 | 2.7 | |
| Turnout | | 1,131 | 55.3 | |
| Protectionist hold | | | | |

==== 1894 ====
This section is an excerpt from 1894 New South Wales colonial election § The Murray

1894 New South Wales colonial election: The Murray
| Party | Candidate | Votes | % | ±% |
|---|---|---|---|---|
| Protectionist | James Hayes | 976 | 64.3 | |
| Free Trade | William Drummond | 543 | 35.8 | |
| Total formal votes | | 1,519 | 98.4 | |
| Informal votes | | 24 | 1.6 | |
| Turnout | | 1,543 | 74.3 | |
| Protectionist win | | (previously 2 members) | | |

==== 1891 ====
This section is an excerpt from 1891 New South Wales colonial election § The Murray

1891 New South Wales colonial election: The Murray Monday 29 June
| Party | Candidate | Votes | % | ±% |
|---|---|---|---|---|
| Protectionist | John Chanter (elected 1) | 956 | 39.1 | |
| Protectionist | Robert Barbour (elected 2) | 918 | 37.5 | |
| Free Trade | George Chandler | 573 | 23.4 | |
| Total formal votes | | 2,447 | 99.3 | |
| Informal votes | | 17 | 0.7 | |
| Turnout | | 1,473 | 48.9 | |
| Protectionist hold 2 | | | | |

=== Elections in the 1880s ===
==== 1889 ====
This section is an excerpt from 1889 New South Wales colonial election § The Murray

1889 New South Wales colonial election: The Murray Monday 28 January
| Party | Candidate | Votes | % | ±% |
|---|---|---|---|---|
| Protectionist | John Chanter (elected 2) | unopposed | | |
| Protectionist | Robert Barbour (elected 1) | unopposed | | |
| Protectionist hold 2 | | | | |

==== 1887 ====
This section is an excerpt from 1887 New South Wales colonial election § The Murray

1887 New South Wales colonial election: The Murray Saturday 26 February
| Party | Candidate | Votes | % | ±% |
|---|---|---|---|---|
| Protectionist | John Chanter (re-elected 1) | 836 | 35.7 | |
| Protectionist | Robert Barbour (re-elected 2) | 759 | 32.4 | |
| Free Trade | William Virgoe | 750 | 32.0 | |
| Total formal votes | | 2,345 | 98.9 | |
| Informal votes | | 26 | 1.1 | |
| Turnout | | 1,377 | 47.8 | |

==== 1885 ====
This section is an excerpt from 1885 New South Wales colonial election § The Murray

1885 New South Wales colonial election: The Murray Thursday 29 October
| Candidate | Votes | % |
|---|---|---|
| John Chanter (elected 1) | 851 | 38.3 |
| Robert Barbour (re-elected 2) | 741 | 33.4 |
| Alexander Wilson (defeated) | 630 | 28.4 |
| Total formal votes | 2,222 | 99.3 |
| Informal votes | 16 | 0.7 |
| Turnout | 1,517 | 55.8 |

==== 1882 ====
This section is an excerpt from 1882 New South Wales colonial election § The Murray

1882 New South Wales colonial election: The Murray Saturday 16 December
| Candidate | Votes | % |
|---|---|---|
| Robert Barbour (elected 1) | 879 | 31.2 |
| Alexander Wilson (re-elected 2) | 832 | 29.5 |
| Thomas Hanson | 633 | 22.5 |
| Edward Killen | 474 | 16.8 |
| Total formal votes | 2,818 | 98.6 |
| Informal votes | 40 | 1.4 |
| Turnout | 1,745 | 59.3 |

==== 1880 ====
This section is an excerpt from 1880 New South Wales colonial election § The Murray

1880 New South Wales colonial election: The Murray Thursday 2 December
| Candidate | Votes | % |
|---|---|---|
| Alexander Wilson (elected 1) | 1,058 | 26.9 |
| William Hay (elected 2) | 992 | 25.2 |
| Edward Killen | 951 | 24.2 |
| Robert Barbour (defeated) | 933 | 23.7 |
| Total formal votes | 3,934 | 98.6 |
| Informal votes | 56 | 1.4 |
| Turnout | 2,206 | 69.1 |
| | (1 new seat) | |

=== Elections in the 1870s ===
==== 1877 ====
This section is an excerpt from 1877 New South Wales colonial election § The Murray

1877 New South Wales colonial election: The Murray Monday 5 November
| Candidate | Votes | % |
|---|---|---|
| Robert Barbour (elected) | 815 | 51.9 |
| James Davidson | 754 | 48.1 |
| Total formal votes | 1,569 | 97.4 |
| Informal votes | 42 | 2.6 |
| Turnout | 1,611 | 62.9 |

==== 1875 ====
This section is an excerpt from 1874-75 New South Wales colonial election § The Murray

1874–75 New South Wales colonial election: The Murray Thursday 7 January 1875
| Candidate | Votes | % |
|---|---|---|
| William Hay (re-elected) | 469 | 58.6 |
| Robert Barbour | 331 | 41.4 |
| Total formal votes | 800 | 100.0 |
| Informal votes | 0 | 0.0 |
| Turnout | 800 | 64.8 |

==== 1872 by-election ====
1872 The Murray by-election Monday 5 August
| Candidate | Votes | % |
|---|---|---|
| William Hay (elected) | 389 | 61.6 |
| George Stephen | 238 | 37.7 |
| Henry Lane | 5 | 0.8 |
| Total formal votes | 632 | 100.0 |
| Informal votes | 0 | 0.0 |
| Turnout | 632 | 54.5 |

Patrick Jennings resigned.

==== 1872 ====
This section is an excerpt from 1872 New South Wales colonial election § The Murray

1872 New South Wales colonial election: The Murray Thursday 21 March
| Candidate | Votes | % |
|---|---|---|
| Patrick Jennings (re-elected) | unopposed | |

=== Elections in the 1860s ===
==== 1869 ====
This section is an excerpt from 1869-70 New South Wales colonial election § The Murray

1869–70 New South Wales colonial election: The Murray Wednesday 29 December 1869
| Candidate | Votes | % |
|---|---|---|
| Patrick Jennings (elected) | 341 | 87.2 |
| Robert Hunt | 50 | 12.8 |
| Total formal votes | 391 | 100.0 |
| Informal votes | 0 | 0.0 |
| Turnout | 391 | 40.5 |

==== 1864 ====
This section is an excerpt from 1864–65 New South Wales colonial election § The Murray

1864–65 New South Wales colonial election: The Murray Saturday 24 December 1864
| Candidate | Votes | % |
|---|---|---|
| Robert Landale (elected) | unopposed | |

==== 1860 ====
This section is an excerpt from 1860 New South Wales colonial election § The Murray

1860 New South Wales colonial election: The Murray Wednesday 19 December
| Candidate | Votes | % |
|---|---|---|
| John Hay (re-elected) | 123 | 97.6 |
| James Willoughby | 3 | 2.4 |
| Total formal votes | 126 | 100.0 |
| Informal votes | 0 | 0.0 |
| Turnout | 126 | 17.5 |

=== Elections in the 1850s ===
==== 1859 ====
This section is an excerpt from 1859 New South Wales colonial election § The Murray

1859 New South Wales colonial election: The Murray Wednesday 29 June
| Candidate | Votes | % |
|---|---|---|
| John Hay (re-elected) | unopposed | |
