= Electoral results for the district of Corowa =

Election results for Corowa, New South Wales, Australia

Corowa, an electoral district of the Legislative Assembly in the Australian state of New South Wales had two incarnations, from 1904 until 1920 and from 1927 until 1950.

First incarnation (1904–1920)
Election	Member	Party
1904	Richard Ball	Liberal Reform
1907	Richard Ball	Liberal Reform
1910	Richard Ball	Liberal Reform
1913	Richard Ball	Farmers and Settlers
1917	Richard Ball	Nationalist
Second incarnation (1927–1950)
Election	Member	Party
1927	Richard Ball	Nationalist
1930	Richard Ball	Nationalist / Country
1932	Richard Ball	Country
1935	Richard Ball	Country
1937 by	Christopher Lethbridge	Independent
1941	Christopher Lethbridge	Independent
1944	Christopher Lethbridge	Independent
1946 by	Ebenezer Kendell	Country
1947	Ebenezer Kendell	Country

== Election results ==
=== Elections in the 1940s ===
==== 1947 ====
1947 New South Wales state election: Corowa
Party	Candidate	Votes	%	±%
Country	Ebenezer Kendell	7,638	63.7	+29.8
Labor	James Adam	4,352	36.3	+7.0
Total formal votes		11,990	99.1	+1.3
Informal votes		111	0.9	−1.3
Turnout		12,101	93.1	+4.6
Country gain from Independent		Swing	N/A	

Ebenezer Kendell (Country) had won the seat at the 1946 by-election following the resignation of Christopher Lethbridge (Independent).

==== 1946 by-election ====
1946 Corowa by-election Saturday 9 November
Party	Candidate	Votes	%	±%
Country	Ebenezer Kendell	4,475	38.8	+4.9
Labor	James Adam	4,362	37.8	+8.5
Liberal	Christopher Lethbridge (defeated)	2,362	23.4	−13.4
Total formal votes		11,530	99.4	+1.6
Informal votes		78	0.7	−1.6
Turnout		11,608	85.1	−3.4
Two-party-preferred result
Country	Ebenezer Kendell	6,677	57.9	
Labor	James Adam	4,853	42.1	
Country gain from Independent		Swing	N/A	

The by-election was caused by the resignation of Christopher Lethbridge (Independent).

==== 1944 ====
1944 New South Wales state election: Corowa
Party	Candidate	Votes	%	±%
Independent	Christopher Lethbridge	4,165	36.8	−26.6
Country	Ebenezer Kendell	3,841	33.9	−2.7
Labor	Thomas McGrath	3,320	29.3	+29.3
Total formal votes		11,326	97.8	−0.4
Informal votes		253	2.2	+0.4
Turnout		11,579	88.5	+0.3
Two-candidate-preferred result
Independent	Christopher Lethbridge	6,846	60.4	−3.0
Country	Ebenezer Kendell	4,480	39.6	+3.0
Independent hold		Swing	−3.0	

==== 1941 ====
1941 New South Wales state election: Corowa
Party	Candidate	Votes	%	±%
Independent	Christopher Lethbridge	7,496	63.4	
Country	James Smith	4,324	36.6	
Total formal votes		11,820	98.2	
Informal votes		210	1.8	
Turnout		12,030	88.2	
Independent hold		Swing		

=== Elections in the 1930s ===
==== 1938 ====
1938 New South Wales state election: Corowa
Party	Candidate	Votes	%	±%
Independent	Christopher Lethbridge	6,333	52.2	+52.2
Country	Ebenezer Kendell	4,973	41.0	−59.0
Independent	Clive Walker	833	6.9	+6.9
Total formal votes		12,139	98.5	
Informal votes		185	1.5	
Turnout		12,324	94.4	
Independent gain from Country		Swing	N/A	

Christopher Lethbridge (Independent) had won the seat at the 1937 by-election following the death of Richard Ball (Country).

==== 1937 by-election ====
1937 Corowa by-election Saturday 11 December 1937
Party	Candidate	Votes	%	±%
Independent	Christopher Lethbridge	5,862	50.3	
Country	Sydney Creed	3,112	26.7	
Country	Alfred Townsend	2,451	21.1	
Independent	Robert Ballantyne	219	1.9	
Total formal votes		11,644	98.2	
Informal votes		211	1.8	
Turnout		11,855	90.5	
Independent gain from Country		Swing	N/A	

The by-election was caused by the death of Richard Ball (Country).

==== 1935 ====
1935 New South Wales state election: Corowa
Party	Candidate	Votes	%	±%
Country	Richard Ball	unopposed		
Country hold				

==== 1932 ====
1932 New South Wales state election: Corowa
Party	Candidate	Votes	%	±%
Country	Richard Ball	4,740	42.2	−19.1
Country	Sydney Creed	3,336	29.7	+29.7
Labor (NSW)	Patrick Quilty	3,143	28.0	−10.7
Total formal votes		11,219	98.7	−0.1
Informal votes		145	1.3	+0.1
Turnout		11,364	95.1	+2.0
Two-candidate-preferred result
Country	Richard Ball	5,610	50.0	
Country	Sydney Creed	5,609	50.0	
Member changed to Country from Nationalist				

- Richard Ball was elected at the 1930 election as a Nationalist candidate, but joined the Country party instead of the UAP.

==== 1930 ====
1930 New South Wales state election: Corowa
Party	Candidate	Votes	%	±%
Nationalist	Richard Ball	6,750	61.3	
Labor	John Metcalfe	4,268	38.7	
Total formal votes		11,018	98.8	
Informal votes		135	1.2	
Turnout		11,153	93.1	
Nationalist hold		Swing		

=== Elections in the 1920s ===
==== 1927 ====
1927 New South Wales state election: Corowa
Party	Candidate	Votes	%	±%
Nationalist	Richard Ball	7,267	69.6	
Labor	James Pearce	3,168	30.4	
Total formal votes		10,435	98.3	
Informal votes		183	1.7	
Turnout		10,618	76.2	
Nationalist win		(new seat)		

District recreated

==== 1920 - 1927 ====
District abolished

=== Elections in the 1910s ===
==== 1917 ====
1917 New South Wales state election: Corowa
Party	Candidate	Votes	%	±%
Nationalist	Richard Ball	3,996	67.7	+2.2
Labor	Samuel Ringwood	1,909	32.3	−2.2
Total formal votes		5,905	99.4	+1.2
Informal votes		34	0.6	−1.2
Turnout		5,939	53.9	−11.5
Nationalist hold		Swing	+2.2	

==== 1913 ====
1913 New South Wales state election: Corowa
Party	Candidate	Votes	%	±%
Farmers and Settlers	Richard Ball (Note: Also endorsed by Liberal Reform.)	4,445	65.5	
Labor	William Tomkins	2,341	34.5	
Total formal votes		6,786	98.2	
Informal votes		125	1.8	
Turnout		6,911	65.4	
Member changed to Farmers and Settlers from Liberal Reform				

==== 1910 ====
1910 New South Wales state election: Corowa
Party	Candidate	Votes	%	±%
Liberal Reform	Richard Ball	3,869	61.5	
Labour	John Grant	2,423	38.5	
Total formal votes		6,292	98.7	
Informal votes		81	1.3	
Turnout		6,373	70.4	
Liberal Reform hold				

=== Elections in the 1900s ===
==== 1907 ====
1907 New South Wales state election: Corowa
Party	Candidate	Votes	%	±%
Liberal Reform	Richard Ball	2,568	56.0	
Labour	John Grant	2,015	44.0	
Total formal votes		4,583	97.5	
Informal votes		120	2.6	
Turnout		4,703	61.2	
Liberal Reform hold				

==== 1904 ====
1904 New South Wales state election: Corowa
Party	Candidate	Votes	%	±%
Liberal Reform	Richard Ball	2,276	62.1	
Independent Liberal	Emanuel Gorman	1,392	38.0	
Total formal votes		3,668	98.5	
Informal votes		55	1.5	
Turnout		3,723	58.3	
Liberal Reform win		(new seat)		

Corowa was a new seat comprising parts of Albury, Murray and the abolished seat of The Hume. Gordon McLaurin (Progressive) was the member for The Hume, however he successfully contested Albury, while James Hayes (Progressive), the member for The Murray was appointed to the Legislative Council and did not contest the election.
