= Deniliquin and Moama Railway Company =

Australian railway company

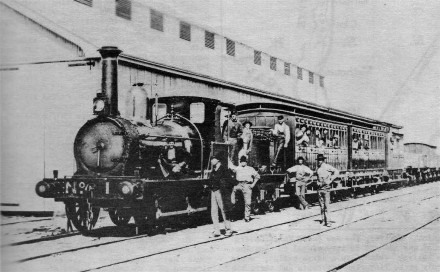
The Deniliquin and Moama Railway Company's locomotive No.1, with Mixed Train, at Deniliquin on the opening day, 4 July 1876

The Deniliquin and Moama Railway Company was a railway company formed by a syndicate of Victorian capitalists to construct a railway from Moama to Deniliquin in New South Wales, Australia. The capital required £125,000 was raised through the sale of £5 shares.

== Background ==
The rich Riverina district of New South Wales, which lies between the Murray and the Murrumbidgee Rivers, was handicapped in the middle of the 19th century by its distance from the seaboard. The Government of Victoria sought to capture the trading potentialities of the area.

A broad gauge (5 ft 3 in (1,600 mm)) railway was opened by the Victorian Railways (VR) between Melbourne and Echuca in September 1864 for goods traffic and in October for passenger business. Echuca lies on the Murray River, which forms the border between Victoria and New South Wales. Consequently, pressure arose to have the line extended across the river, northward to Deniliquin. However, the Government of New South Wales was adamant in its refusal to construct a railway which, to a large extent, would have only served Victorian interests.

== New South Wales concedes ==
In a weak moment during March 1874 and under considerable political pressure, the Government of New South Wales passed an Act which enabled the construction by a private syndicate of a 1600mm gauge railway from Moama to Deniliquin. The line was 44 mi (71 km) long, connecting with the Victorian Railways line at the bridge over the Murray River, near Echuca.

== Construction ==
Work commenced at Echuca where a junction was made with the Victorian northern railway. The initial crossing of the Murray was made over a temporary trestle bridge, 1,700 feet (520 m) in length and built from red gum piles. As it was necessary to permit the passage of river craft, a lifting span was incorporated.

Clear of the Murray, the railway entered Moama. The country from Moama to Deniliquin comprises a series of almost level plains. The permanent way was laid on the surface and ballasted with sand. Throughout its length, there were only five curves of 80 chains (1.6 km). The line was built within a period of 12 months.

John Whitton, the Engineer-in-Charge for the New South Wales Government Railways, was not impressed by the construction standards.

"Although this line will be perfectly safe for public traffic so long as it is properly maintained, I regret that I am unable to certify that it has been completed to my satisfaction, and for the following reasons. The rails weighing 50 lbs. to the yard are too light for the heavy rolling stock now running over them. The ballast is not of a quality to merit my approval, and I do not think a good road can be maintained with it during wet weather. No care appears to have been taken in selecting the timber for the bridges, as many of the beams in almost every structure are very much split and have large dead knots, worm holes, and gum veins in them. The driving of the piles has been most erratic; they are leaning in all direction, and are rarely driven throughout any bridge at equal distances from the centre line of roadway. The carpentry generally is of the roughest possible kind. The line has not been set out in a satisfactory manner. Those portions which should be straight are in most cases crooked, and some of them to a very considerable extent."

== Official opening ==
On 4 July 1876, Moama celebrated the opening of the line with great gusto; a whole bullock being roasted and eaten in honour of the event. The Official gathering was held at Deniliquin where some 600 guests enjoyed the hospitality of the directors of the company.

The only member of the NSW Legislature present at Deniliquin for the opening was the local Member for Murray, William Hay. Such was the disinterest by the NSW Government in providing a rail connection to the town that it was reputed to have quipped that "The New South Wales Government would as soon think of proposing to make a railway to the Moon as to Deniliquin". There remains no rail connection at Deniliquin with the NSW Railway system.

== New bridge across the Murray ==
A contract was signed in September 1875 for an iron bridge to replace the temporary wooden one. A contemporary newspaper account highlights the terrors associated with the crossing of the original temporary bridge. "Frequently, passengers from Echuca would cross the river in a boat and board the train at Moama rather than risk what appeared to be a very perilous journey across the bridge. Passengers......state that the train appeared to crawl over the rickerty structure, which swayed and creaked as if it was going to collapse every minute and let the train.......drop into the swift-moving stream of the River Murray".

== Fares, people & freight ==
On opening, a second class fare to Deniliquin was 9 shillings. This was higher per mile (40 miles) than the longer journey (60m) from Melbourne to Sandhurst (Castlemaine) which cost 6 shillings.

In 1877, The Riverine Herald noted that 'Were it not for this line, traffic between Deniliquin and Echuca would almost be suspended, owing to the scarcity of feed along the route. As the River Murray has not been navigable for some months, and as it will not be for a few weeks to come, the people of the outlying districts of Riverina would have had to suffer considerable hardships had the railway not been completed. As it is large quantities of merchandise, &c., are daily arriving at the terminus for the back country. It would be impossible for sheep to be sent to market from Riverina if this line was not available for transit. In fact the advantages accruing to the inhabitants of these parts from the railway at the present time are legion in number.'

The papers reported in 1877, that the passenger traffic has been 'so large recently that the passenger carriages at present owned by the Company are barely sufficient to meet requirements. We hear that there have been recently as many as ninety-five passengers by one train—a striking contrast to the days of King Cobb, when under ordinary circumstances one coach daily [8 - 14 passengers] was considered sufficient to meet the requirements of the travelling public between here [Deniliquin] and Moama.'

In 1888, a reporter noted 'It may not generally be known that the traveller can leave Deniliquin by the early morning train and go by Echuca to Seymour and there catch the express from Melbourne which will take him either to Albury by eleven o'clock the same night, or Sydney by noon the next day, thus saving a dreary coach drive to either Hay or Jerilderie or a railway ride via Melbourne with the at least twelve hours loss of time in each case. The same thing happens with regard to delivery of the mails at Deniliquin from Sydney.

== Performance ==
In the first six months, the line carried 15,000 passengers, 19,999 tons of freight, 275,302 sheep, and 19,937 bales of wool. Gross revenue was £13,308. In 1878, for the fifth half yearly review Charles Lilley, the Traffic Manager, reported 30,843 operational miles, 15,451 passengers, 12,021 tons of freight, 234,000 sheep, 8,520 cattle, and 21,000 bales of wool.

The half-year dividend to shareholders was 7.5% (7 shillings and 6 pence per share on 25,000 shares of £5 each). In 1885 and In 1887 at the 26th half-year review, the dividend was 8%. At the next half-year review, the dividend was 10%. In 1892 (35th meeting) the dividend was 7%, which the Directors considered 'satisfactory taking into account the general depression all over the colonies'. At the 39th meeting in 1894, the dividend was 5%. The chairman noted that 'the shareholders had actually received in dividends more than twice as much as they had paid into the company in the first place'. The same dividend was paid in 1896.

In 1899, the dividend fell to 4%, which the Chairman attributed to the "continuous droughts". A year later, the situation was no better. The board recommended that "having regard to the probable continuance of the present severe drought, they do not deem it advisable to recommend the payment of a dividend, although the earnings show a profit of three per cent, on the year".

In 1901, the dividend was 4% but the chairman warned that "the drought was still persistently sticking to this part of the country, and shareholders could hardly expect a better dividend until we had good rains and consequently good seasons, when there would be plenty of produce to carry, and an all round improvement in business". The same dividend was paid and the same caution repeated in 1903. In 1905, the dividend was 2.5%. The chairman noted that "as the lambing has been good, and there is abundance of grass and water all over the district, better returns may be looked for".

In 1908, the dividend rose to 5%. The chairman said that "business had been better than for many years, and no extra labor had been employed. The directors had purchased 250 tons of new rails to keep the line in thorough order". The same dividend was paid in 1910 and 1911. In 1914, a 1-shilling bonus was added to the 5% dividend. The chairman said: "During the lean years the shareholders had to go without any dividends, but on the present occasion the business transacted has been so good that the directors felt justified in recommending payment of a bonus of 1/- per share in addition to the 5% dividend". In 1919, the dividend was 6%, and it rose to 7% in 1921. The same dividend was paid in 1922. In 1923, the dividend was 8%.

In August 1923, at the 98th half-yearly meeting, an 8% dividend was announced. The directors also informed the shareholders that negotiations were In progress between the Victorian Government and the company for the purchase of the company's property. The shareholders endorsed the sale and, on Tuesday 5 February 1924, the 99th and last half-yearly meeting was held. A dividend of 3% was approved. The chairman, S J. Staughton said he was sorry the company had come to an end, not only because it was a good financial investment, but because it was always a pleasure to him to visit Deniliquin and to know the very satisfactory way the staff had always helped to make the business a success. Whether the railway would be as satisfactory to the residents of the district as it had been formerly, remained to be proved.

== State acquisition ==
On 1 December 1923, under the terms of the 1922 Border Railways Act, the Deniliquin and Moama Railway Company was taken over by the New South Wales government for transfer to the Victorian Railways. Since that date, the line has been part of the Victorian railway system.

== Rolling stock ==
=== Locomotives ===
All four of the Company's locomotives were built to the design of the Victorian Railways T class 0-6-0 tender engine of 1874. None have been preserved, however VR T class number 94 (originally 265) is preserved and on display at the Newport Railway Museum.

Class	Wheel arrangement	Fleet number	Manufacturer	Builders number	Year introduced	Year withdrawn	Comments
Unclassed (Later VR T)	0-6-0	1	Beyer, Peacock & Company	1588	1875	1925	
Unclassed (Later VR T)	0-6-0	2	Beyer, Peacock & Company	1589	1875	1925	
Unclassed (Later VR T)	0-6-0	3	Beyer, Peacock & Company	1664	1876	1927	renumbered as T class 96
Unclassed (Later VR T)	0-6-0	4	Beyer, Peacock & Company	1735	1878	1925	

=== Passenger Carriages and Vans ===
Deniliquin and Moama Railway Company owned a number of fixed-wheel passenger carriages and guards vans.

The first class cars, 1 & 2 A, had four compartments and six wheels; they became 4 & 43 X in the VR roster. Car 4 X was converted into a workmen's sleeper and lasted into the 1980s. Second class cars had five compartments and four wheels. Guards vans 1 and 2 D also had six wheels, becoming VR 27 & 33 Z, and remained in service until the 1970s. All of these appear to be of similar design to existing VR carriages, if not identical. It is not clear how many of each the D&MR owned, and it is most probable that VR stock was used at various times.

=== Goods Wagons ===
A variety of four-wheel rolling stock was also acquired by the VR when they took-over the Deniliquin and Moama Railway Company in 1923.

Amongst the goods stock of the D&MR were nine fixed wheel open wagons similar in design to their 'standard' 10 ton capacity I wagons, which the VR had been building through the 1880s. These wagons were classed ID and numbered 31, and 33 to 50. In 1922 five more had been built to the standard pattern of I wagons of that period by Newport Workshops, as ID 46 to 50. After 1923, these last five wagons were re-numbered into the I wagon group to replace accident damaged vehicles, some surviving until the 1970s.

There were also four flat wagons coded NK numbered 1 to 4, twenty-seven box vans coded HD numbered 5 to 31, and thirteen ballast wagons coded ND numbered 13, and 65 to 76. Many of these were scrapped soon after acquisition, however some survived as late as the 1970s. There may have been other wagons owned by the D&MR, apart from the many from VR that were used frequently on through traffic.

It appears that all the D&MR stock was originally uncoded, but a later date (presumed to be the mid 1900s) the VR equivalent codes were emplaced with the suffix D added to indicate their unusual origin.

Companies
First	Deniliquin and Moama Railway Company; 1874 – 30 November 1923	Succeeded by Victorian Railways
