= 1937 Corowa state by-election =

Election result for Corowa, New South Wales, Australia

A by-election was held for the New South Wales Legislative Assembly electorate of Corowa on 11 December 1937 because of the death of Richard Ball (Country).

== Dates ==
Date	Event
30 October 1937	Richard Ball died.
10 November 1937	Writ of election issued by the Speaker of the Legislative Assembly and close of electoral rolls.
19 November 1937	Nominations
11 December 1937	Polling day, between the hours of 8 am and 8 pm
24 December 1937	Return of writ

== Result ==
1937 Corowa by-election]] Saturday 11 December 1937
Party	Candidate	Votes	%	±%
Independent	Christopher Lethbridge	5,862	50.3	
Country	Sydney Creed	3,112	26.7	
Country	Alfred Townsend	2,451	21.1	
Independent	Robert Ballantyne	219	1.9	
Total formal votes		11,644	98.2	
Informal votes		211	1.8	
Turnout		11,855	90.5	
Independent gain from Country		Swing	N/A	

== See also ==
- Electoral results for the district of Corowa
- List of New South Wales state by-elections
