= 1985 Murray state by-election =

Election result for Murray, New South Wales, Australia

A by-election was held for the New South Wales Legislative Assembly electorate of Murray on 2 February 1985. The election was triggered by the resignation of National party member, Tim Fischer to successfully contest the seat of Farrer at the 1984 federal election.

The Murray by-election was held the same day as the Peats by-election.

== Dates ==
| Date | Event |
|---|---|
| 18 October 1984 | Tim Fischer resigned from parliament. |
| 3 January 1985 | Writ of election issued by the Speaker of the Legislative Assembly and close of electoral rolls. |
| 10 January 1985 | Nominations |
| 2 February 1985 | Polling day |
| 22 February 1985 | Return of writ |

== Results ==
1985 Murray by-election Saturday 2 February
| Party | Candidate | Votes | % | ±% |
|---|---|---|---|---|
| National | Jim Small | 16,678 | 63.0 | −5.0 |
| Independent | Ray Brooks | 9,813 | 37.0 | +13.7 |
| Total formal votes | | 26,491 | 97.5 | −1.0 |
| Informal votes | | 677 | 2.5 | +1.0 |
| Turnout | | 27,168 | 82.1 | −6.5 |
| National hold | | Swing | −5.0 | |

== See also ==
- Electoral results for the district of Murray
- List of New South Wales state by-elections
