= 1973 Murray state by-election =

Election result for Murray, New South Wales, Australia

A by-election was held for the New South Wales Legislative Assembly electorate of Murray on 6 October 1973 because of the death of Joe Lawson (Independent). Lawson had represented the district since 1932, as a member of the Country Party until 1968 when he lost pre-selection. He ran as an independent, winning the seat at the 1968 and 1971 elections.

== Dates ==
Date	Event
14 August 1973	Joe Lawson died.
7 September 1973	Writ of election issued by the Speaker of the Legislative Assembly.
14 September 1973	Nominations
6 October 1973	Polling day
2 November 1973	Return of writ

== Candidates ==
This was the first election for all 3 candidates and each would again contest the electorate at the general election in November 1973 with similar results.

- Mary Meillon (Liberal) was the eldest daughter of Joe Lawson.
- Bruce Jeffery (Country) was secretary of the Rural Lands Protection Board in Jerilderie and would later be elected the member for Oxley.
- Douglas Drew (Labor) did not stand again after 1973.

== Result ==
1973 Murray by-election Saturday 6 October
Party	Candidate	Votes	%	±%
Country	Bruce Jeffery	6,663	39.96	+8.77
Liberal	Mary Meillon	5,661	33.95	+19.68
Labor	Douglas Drew	4,351	26.09	+26.09
Total formal votes		16,675	98.6	+1.6
Informal votes		236	1.4	−1.6
Turnout		16,911	85.0	−5.6
Two-party-preferred result
Liberal	Mary Meillon	8,335	51.15	+51.15
Country	Bruce Jeffery	8,145	48.85	−0.57
Liberal gain from Independent		Swing		

== See also ==
- Electoral results for the district of Murray
- List of New South Wales state by-elections
