= 1917 Murray state by-election =

Election result for Murray, New South Wales, Australia

A by-election was held in the New South Wales state electoral district of Murray on 22 September 1917. The by-election was triggered by the death of Robert Scobie (Nationalist).

== Dates ==
| Date | Event |
|---|---|
| 15 August 1917 | Death of Robert Scobie. |
| 24 August 1917 | Writ of election issued by the Speaker of the Legislative Assembly and close of electoral rolls. |
| 1 September 1917 | Nominations |
| 22 September 1917 | Polling day |
| 9 October 1917 | Return of writ |

== Results ==
1917 Murray by-election Saturday 22 September
| Party | Candidate | Votes | % | ±% |
|---|---|---|---|---|
| Nationalist | Brian Doe | 3,041 | 58.6 | 0.0 |
| Labor | Richard O'Halloran | 2,147 | 41.4 | +1.1 |
| Total formal votes | | 5,188 | 100.0 | +1.1 |
| Informal votes | | 0 | | −1.1 |
| Turnout | | 5,188 | 53.6 (Note: based on an electoral roll of 9,672 at the 1917 state election.) | +1.5 |
| Nationalist hold | | Swing | 0.0 | |

== See also ==
- Electoral results for the district of Murray
- List of New South Wales state by-elections
