= Deniliquin railway station =

Railway Station in New South Wales

Deniliquin
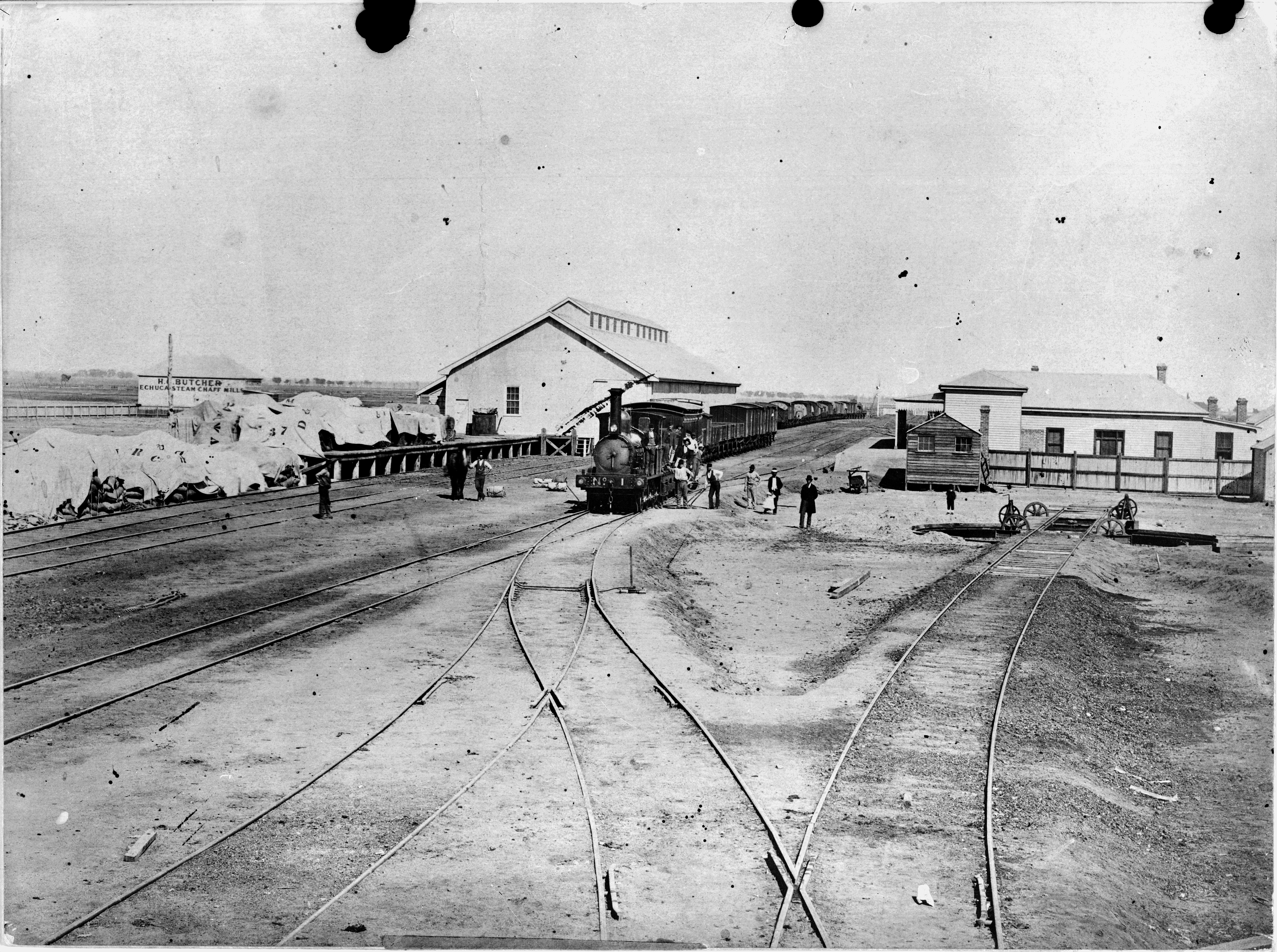
- Deniliquin Railway Station on opening day.

General information
- Location: Australia
- Coordinates: 35°31′52″S 144°57′26″E
- Line: Deniliquin
- Distance: 322.91 kilometres from Southern Cross
- Platforms: 2
- Tracks: 3

Other information
- Status: Closed
- Station code: DQN

History
- Opened: 4 July 1876

Services
Preceding station	Disused railways	Following station
Southdown	Deniliquin line	Terminus
	List of closed railway stations in New South Wales	
Track layout
Location

Deniliquin railway station was a railway station serving the town of Deniliquin, New South Wales, Australia. The station was opened on 4 July 1876 by the Deniliquin and Moama Railway Company and was bought by Victorian Railways in 1923. The station was the terminus of the Deniliquin railway line. The station building was demolished and is not in use anymore.

== History ==
Residents of Deniliquin lobbied for the railway due to the high costs of freight transfer, with one estimate that the cost of sending a ton of goods from Echuca to Deniliquin was quoted at more than twice the cost of bringing the same goods from London to Melbourne. In March 1874, the Government of New South Wales passed an Act which allowed private enterprise to construct a railway from Moama to Deniliquin, connecting with the Victorian Railways line at the bridge over the Murray River near Echuca. Work commenced on the line in late 1875. The line cost around £4000 per mile to construct.

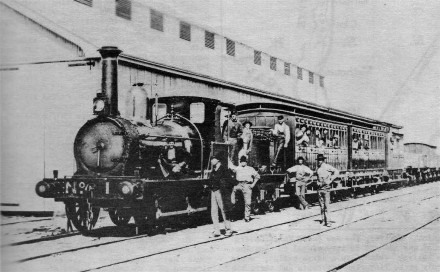
The Deniliquin and Moama Railway Company's locomotive No.1, with Mixed Train, at Deniliquin on the Opening Day, 4 July 1876

Deniliquin railway station was opened on 4 July 1876 where a large crowd of people assembled to greet the arrival of the first train at 2 pm, celebrated by performances from the town's brass band. A ceremony took place in the station's large good shed to mark the opening of the line, attended by up to 700 people including the directors of the railway company as well as John Hay, MP for The Murray.

The station and the line was bought by Victorian Railways in 1923, as part of the 1922 Border Railways Act.

On 8 April 1924 a significant fire originating in the booking office of the station led to the almost complete destruction of both the station building and the neighbouring railway hotel.

The station nowadays is unrecognisable, with no platforms intact and the yard ripped up. There have been a number of calls from within Deniliquin and along the former line from Echuca for the rail to be returned. The station building was demolished some time in 1984. The silos are intact but unreachable by train.
