= Ebenezer Kendell =

Australian politician

Personal details
- Born: 31 May 1886 near Minlaton, South Australia
- Died: 7 April 1966 (aged 79) Lockhart, New South Wales
- Party: Country Party

Ebenezer Thomas Kendell (31 May 1886 – 7 April 1966) was an Australian politician and a member of the New South Wales Legislative Assembly from 1946 until 1950. He was a member of the Country Party.

== Early life ==
Kendell was born at Miniacowie near Minalton on the Yorke Peninsula, South Australia. He was the son of a farmer and was educated to elementary level. He became a wheat farmer in the Wimmera district of Victoria and served in the First Australian Imperial Force in the Middle East and France in World War One. Following repatriation, he was one of a 100 Australian farmers chosen to study irrigation and wheat growing at the University of California. He moved from the Wimmera to Lockhart, New South Wales in 1927 and became active in community organizations including the Farmers' and Settlers' Association of New South Wales, the Returned and Services League of Australia, the Australian Wheat Growers Association, the Hospital Board and the Show Society.

== State Parliament ==
Kendall was the unsuccessful Country Party candidate for the seat of Corowa at the state elections of 1938, and 1944. On both occasions he was defeated by the incumbent Independent Country member Christopher Lethbridge. Kendell was elected as the member for Corowa at the 1946 by-election caused by Lethbridge's resignation to contest the federal seat of Riverina at the 1946 election. Lethbridge was unsuccessful and then contested the by-election as the Liberal candidate but was beaten by Kendell, who retained the seat at the next election in 1947. The seat was abolished by a redistribution at the 1950 election and Kendell stood as one of two endorsed candidates for the seat of Murray. He was defeated by the incumbent member Joe Lawson, and retired from public life. He did not hold a party, parliamentary or ministerial position.

New South Wales Legislative Assembly
Preceded by Christopher Lethbridge	Member for Corowa; 1946 – 1950	Succeeded by Seat abolished
