= 1947 New South Wales state election =

State election for New South Wales, Australia in May 1947

← 1944	3 May 1947	1950 →

All 90 seats in the New South Wales Legislative Assembly 46 Assembly seats were needed for a majority
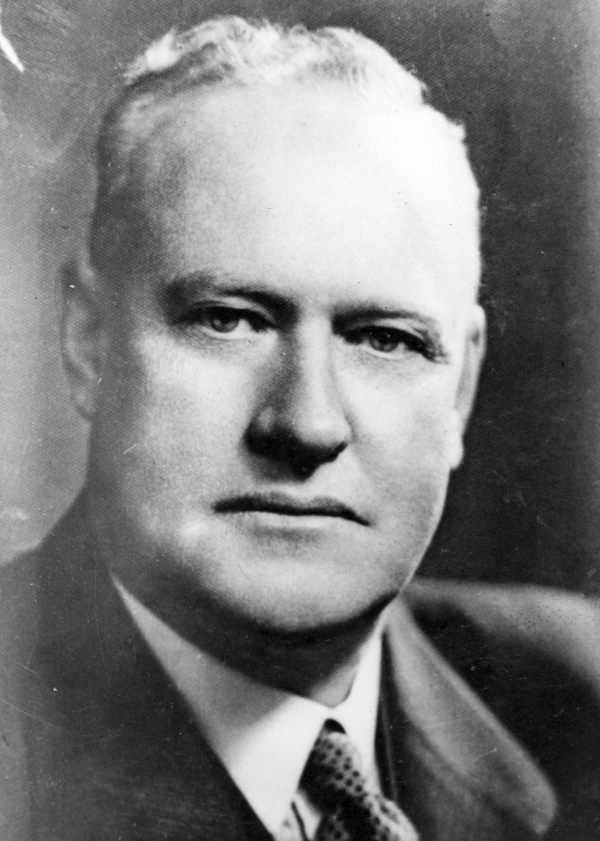

	First party	Second party
Leader	James McGirr	Vernon Treatt
Party	Labor	Liberal/Country coalition
Leader since	6 February 1947	20 March 1946
Leader's seat	Bankstown	Woollahra
Last election	56 seats	22 seats
Seats won	52	34
Seat change	▼4	▲12
Percentage	45.95%	40.75%
Swing	▲0.75	▲11.43
- Two-candidate-preferred margin by electorate
Premier before election
James McGirr
Labor
Elected Premier
James McGirr
Labor

The 1947 New South Wales state election was held on 3 May 1947. It was conducted in single member constituencies with compulsory preferential voting and was held on boundaries created at a 1940 redistribution. The election was for all of the 90 seats in the Legislative Assembly.

== Issues ==
At the beginning of 1947, Labor had been in power for 6 years under the premiership of William McKell. The urban conservative parties, which had been in a state of disarray at the previous election in 1944 had been unified as the Liberal Party of Australia under the federal leadership of Robert Menzies. However, in New South Wales the state Liberals had lost their two most experienced and capable leaders, Reginald Weaver who had died in November 1945 and Alexander Mair who had resigned from parliament to unsuccessfully contest a NSW senate seat at the 1946 federal election. They had been led by Vernon Treatt since March 1946. In February 1947, 3 months before the election was due, McKell stunned most people in the Labor Party and general community by announcing that he would resign to take up the position of Governor-General. McKell's preference as a successor was his ally in the struggle against Jack Lang, Bob Heffron. However, revealing the residual influence of Lang, the caucus chose his preferred candidate, the Housing Minister, James McGirr. Both parties went to the election with untried leaders. However, residual respect for McKell, continuing economic growth, the popularity of the federal Labor government and the memory of the factional fights among the state's conservative politicians gave Labor a significant advantage in the campaign.

== Key dates ==
Date	Event
6 February 1947	First McGirr ministry sworn in.
29 March 1947	The Legislative Assembly was dissolved, and writs were issued by the Governor to proceed with an election.
3 April 1947	Nominations for candidates for the election closed at noon.
3 May 1947	Polling day.
19 May 1947	Second McGirr ministry sworn in.
27 May 1947	Last day for the writs to be returned and the results formally declared.
28 May 1947	Opening of 35th Parliament.

== Results ==
While Labor lost some of the traditionally conservative seats it had picked up at the 1944 election to the Liberal Party, the result of the election was a landslide victory for Labor. Many of the gains of the Liberal and Country parties were conservative members who had been elected as independents at the previous election. They had rejoined the parties when some degree of order had been restored:

New South Wales state election, 3 May 1947 Legislative Assembly << 1944–1950 >>
Enrolled voters	1,852,787 (Note: There were 1,713,921 enrolled voters in 82 contested electorates and 138,866 were enrolled in 8 uncontested electorates (5 Labor and 3 Country).)				
Votes cast	1,621,257		Turnout	94.61	+3.19
Informal votes	32,262		Informal	1.99	−1.14
Summary of votes by party
Party	Primary votes	%	Swing	Seats	Change
Labor	730,194	45.95	+ 0.75	52	−4
Liberal (Note: Includes Doug Padman (Albury) and Ray Bladwell (Goulburn) who were jointly endorsed by the Liberal and Country parties.) (Note: Swing and change are compared to the Democratic Party at the 1944 election.)	485,286	30.50	+5.34	19	+7
Country	162,467	10.22	−0.19	15	+5
Independent	94,163	5.92	+0.20	2	−3
Lang Labor	64,851	4.08	−5.25	2	−
Communist	27,237	1.71	−0.03	0	−
Independent Labor	13,917	0.88	−0.91	0	−
Independent Liberal (Note: Swing and change are compared to Independent Democrat at the 1944 election.)	11,150	0.49	-1.92	0	−4
Protestant Labour	3,361	0.21	+0.21	0	−
Other			-4.50		−1
Total	1,589,265			90	

== Retiring members ==
William McKell (Labor, Redfern) resigned in February 1947; no by-election was held due to the proximity of the election.

=== Labor ===
- Ted Horsington (Sturt)
- John Sweeney (Bulli)

== Seats changing party representation ==
Seat	1944		1947	
Seat	Party	Member	Member	Party
Albury (Note: John Hurley (Labor) had won the seat at the 1946 Corowa by-election caused by the resignation of former Premier Alexander Mair (Liberal).)	Liberal		Doug Padman	Liberal
Corowa (Note: Ebenezer Kendell (Country) had won the seat at the 1946 Corowa by-election caused by the resignation of Independent Christopher Lethbridge.)	Independent		Ebenezer Kendell	Country
Drummoyne	Labor	Robert Greig	Robert Dewley	Liberal
Hornsby	Independent Democrat	Sydney Storey		Liberal
Lachlan	Labor	John Chanter	Robert Medcalf	Country
Lane Cove	Labor	Henry Woodward	Ken McCaw	Liberal
Manly (Note: Douglas Darby (Liberal) won the seat at the 1945 Manly by-election caused by the death of Independent Democrat turned Liberal Alfred Reid.)	Independent Democrat		Douglas Darby	Liberal
Mosman	Independent	Donald Macdonald	Pat Morton	Liberal
Nepean	Independent Democrat	Joseph Jackson (Note: Joseph Jackson (Nepean) was re-elected in 1944 as Independent Democrat candidate and later joined the Liberal Party.)		Liberal
Orange	Labor	Bob O'Halloran	Charles Cutler	Country
Oxley	Independent Country	Les Jordan		Country
Ryde (Note: Eric Hearnshaw (Liberal) had won the seat at the 1945 Ryde by-election caused by the death of Independent James Shand.)	Independent Democrat		Eric Hearnshaw	Liberal
Tamworth	Independent	Bill Chaffey		Country

== Aftermath ==
McGirr, Treatt and Country Party Leader Michael Bruxner retained their leadership roles throughout the parliament.

There were 11 by-elections during the parliament with a net loss of 3 seats for Labor.

== See also ==
- Members of the New South Wales Legislative Assembly, 1947–1950
- Candidates of the 1947 New South Wales state election
