= 1872 Murray colonial by-election =

By-election in New South Wales, Australia

A by-election was held for the New South Wales Legislative Assembly electorate of Murray on 5 August 1872 because of the resignation of Patrick Jennings. William Hay was elected with 61% of the vote.

== Dates ==
Date	Event
25 June 1872	Patrick Jennings resigned.
26 June 1872	Writ of election issued by the Speaker of the Legislative Assembly and close of electoral rolls.
22 July 1872	Nominations
5 August 1872	Polling day
31 August 1872	Return of writ

== Results ==
1872 The Murray by-election Monday 5 August
Candidate	Votes	%
William Hay (elected)	389	61.6
George Stephen	238	37.7
Henry Lane	5	0.8
Total formal votes	632	100.0
Informal votes	0	0.0
Turnout	632	54.5

== See also ==
- Electoral results for the district of Murray
- List of New South Wales state by-elections
