= William O'Brien (Australian politician) =

Australian politician

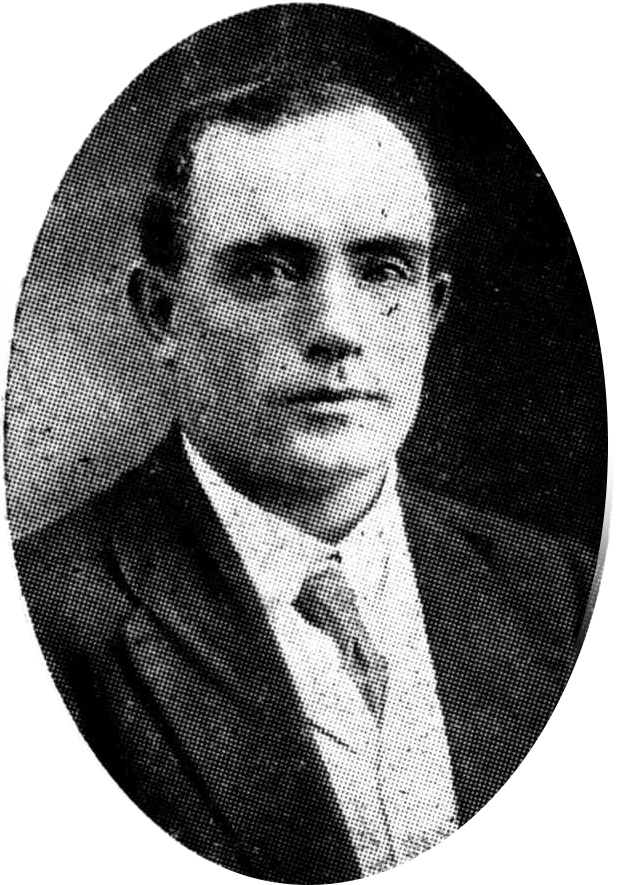
Mr William O'Brien

William Joseph O'Brien (7 September 1882 – 15 June 1953) was an Australian politician.

He was born in Parkes to carrier William O'Brien and Bridget, née O'Sullivan. He worked as a cabinetmaker and in the railways, and was an official in the Furniture Trades' Union, being a delegate to and later president of the Trades and Labor Council. In 1916 he was a foundation member of the Industrial Vigilance Council and a delegate to the Anti-Conscription League, and from 1913 to 1917 he served on the central executive of the Australian Labor Party (vice-president 1916–17). In 1917 he was elected to the New South Wales Legislative Assembly as the member for Annandale, transferring to Murray with the introduction of proportional representation in 1920. O'Brien served until 1925. He died at Leichhardt in 1953.

New South Wales Legislative Assembly
Preceded by Arthur Griffith	Member for Annandale; 1917–1920	Succeeded by Seat abolished
Preceded by Brian Doe	Member for Murray; 1920–1925; Served alongside: Ball, Beeby/Kilpatrick	Succeeded by Vern Goodin
