= 1946 Corowa state by-election =

Election result for Corowa, New South Wales, Australia

A by-election was held for the New South Wales Legislative Assembly electorate of Corowa on 9 November 1946 because of the resignation of Christopher Lethbridge (Independent), to contest the federal seat of Riverina at the 1946 election as a Liberal candidate, however he was unsuccessful. Lethbridge then nominated as a Liberal candidate to regain the seat.

The by-elections for Albury, Auburn and Ashfield were held on the same day.

== Dates ==
Date	Event
16 August 1946	Christopher Lethbridge resigned.
28 September 1946	Federal election
15 October 1946	Writ of election issued by the Speaker of the Legislative Assembly and close of electoral rolls.
21 October 1946	Nominations
9 November 1946	Polling day, between the hours of 8 am and 8 pm
27 November 1946	Return of writ

== Result ==
1946 Corowa by-election]] Saturday 9 November
Party	Candidate	Votes	%	±%
Country	Ebenezer Kendell	4,475	38.8	+4.9
Labor	James Adam	4,362	37.8	+8.5
Liberal	Christopher Lethbridge (defeated)	2,362	23.4	−13.4
Total formal votes		11,530	99.4	+1.6
Informal votes		78	0.7	−1.6
Turnout		11,608	85.1	−3.4
Two-party-preferred result
Country	Ebenezer Kendell	6,677	57.9	
Labor	James Adam	4,853	42.1	
Country gain from Independent		Swing	N/A	

== See also ==
- Electoral results for the district of Corowa
- List of New South Wales state by-elections
