= John Donovan (Australian politician) =

Australian politician (1902–1976)

Member of the New South Wales Parliament for Murray
- In office 25 October 1930 – 18 May 1932
- Preceded by: Mat Davidson
- Succeeded by: Joe Lawson

Personal details
- Born: John Rawdon Donovan; 24 October 1902 Deniliquin, New South Wales
- Died: 12 February 1976 (aged 73) Sydney
- Resting place: Northern Suburbs Lawn Cemetery
- Party: Labor Party
- Spouse: Hilda Thomson
- Children: 3
- Occupation: Telegraphist, Publican

John Rawdon Donovan (24 October 1902 – 12 February 1976) was an Australian politician. He was a Labor Party member of the New South Wales Legislative Assembly from 1930 until 1932, representing the electorate of Murray.

Donovan was born at Deniliquin, and educated at Deniliquin Intermediate School and by night school. He joined the Postmaster General's Department in 1917 as a messenger boy and later, a telegraphist. He left the postal service in 1926, taking over the license of his family's hotel, the Edward River Hotel at Deniliquin, until his election to parliament. He was involved in local politics, serving as an alderman of the Deniliquin Council from 1920 until 1930. Donovan was also a prominent member of the local sporting community, and served as secretary of the Deniliquin Athletics Club and the Deniliquin Licensed Victuallers Race Club at the time of his election.

In 1930, Mat Davidson, the popular local Labor MLA, decided to contest the new seat of Cobar, and Donovan was selected by Labor to run for his old seat of Murray. He won a narrow victory amidst Labor's strong victory at the 1930 election, defeating Country Party candidate Joe Lawson. His career was to be short-lived, however; Donovan lost his seat to Lawson in 1932, as Labor suffered a significant defeat across the state. He again contested Murray in 1935, but was soundly defeated by Lawson.

He subsequently worked in the New South Wales Department of Labour and Industry from 1933 until 1935, and was the private secretary to senior federal minister Eddie Ward from 1941 until 1947. He was the secretary of the Australian delegation to the International Labour Organization conference in Geneva in 1947. He was then appointed as a Commonwealth Conciliation Commissioner, serving until his retirement in 1956. He died in Sydney in 1976, and was buried in the Northern Suburbs Lawn Cemetery.

New South Wales Legislative Assembly
Preceded by Mat Davidson	Member for Murray; 1930–1932	Succeeded by Joe Lawson
