= Vern Goodin =

Australian politician

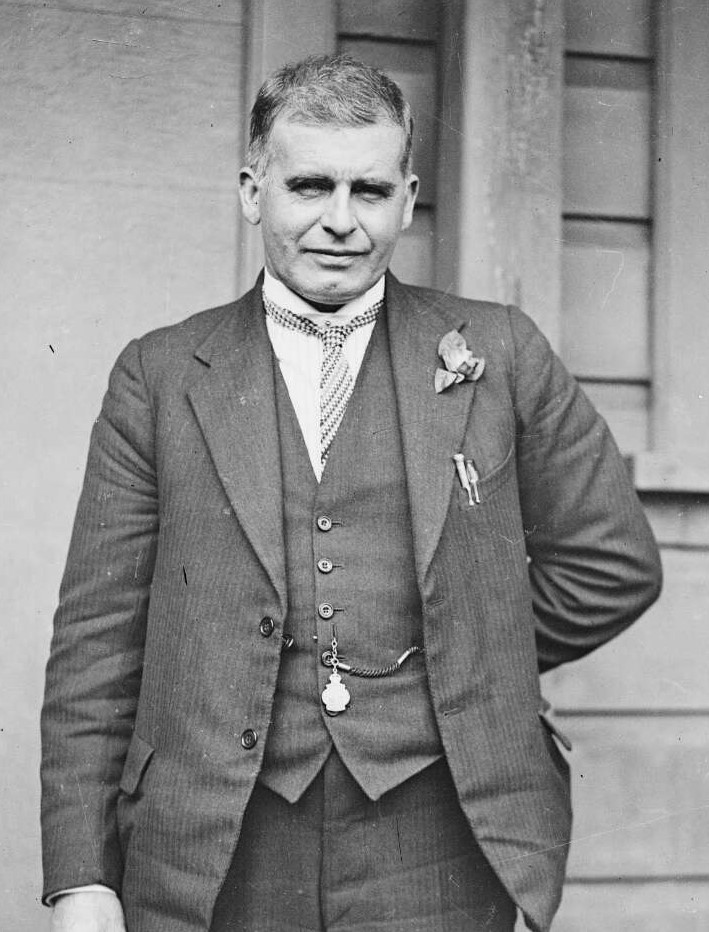

Vernon William Edward Goodin (24 July 1892 – 12 October 1971) was an Australian politician.

Goodin was born in Kenthurst near Sydney and educated at Albion Street Superior public school and Sydney Boys High School, and became a teacher in state schools. He married Margaret Elsie Morison in December 1917 and they had one daughter and one son.

Goodin was elected as a Labor Party member for the seat of Murray in the New South Wales Legislative Assembly in 1925. After being expelled from the party for opposition to Jack Lang he lost his seat in 1927 and returned to teaching.

Goodin married Leila Edith Rosenthall in 1939 and had one daughter and one son. He died in the Sydney suburb of Carlingford.

== Notes ==
New South Wales Legislative Assembly
Preceded by William O'Brien	Member for Murray; 1925–1927; Served alongside: Richard Ball, Matthew Kilpatrick	Succeeded by Mat Davidson
