= Robert Barbour (New South Wales politician) =

Australian politician

Robert Barbour (January 1827 – 4 August 1895) was an Australian politician, merchant and squatter.

== Early life ==
Barbour was born Beith, Ayrshire, Scotland and migrated to Victoria in 1851. He married Catherine Pitty in 1858 and they had 12 children.

He owned redgum sawmills at Echuca, Barmah and Yeilima (near Nathalia, Victoria) until 1877 and several paddle steamers until around 1879. He was later involved in land speculation and became embroiled in expensive legal disputes with Henry Ricketson, ultimately losing before the Privy Council and ordered to pay Ricketson's costs, which all but ruined him financially.

== Parliamentary career ==
He was the member for the New South Wales Legislative Assembly seat of Murray from 1877 to 1880 and from 1882 to 1894. He was a candidate at the 1874-75 election for Murray, endorsed by the local selectors' association but received 41.38% of the votes and was defeated by the sitting member William Hay who was supported by the squatters. Hay did not contest the 1877 election and Barbour was elected with 51.94% of the votes. Murray became a two-member electorate for the 1880 election however Barbour was defeated by Hay and Alexander Wilson. Barbour stood for the 1882 by-election for Gundagai but received just 12.43% of the votes.

Hay did not contest the 1882 election and Barbour was elected first with 31.19% of the votes while Wilson was re-elected. Barbour was re-elected at the 1885 election while Wilson was defeated by John Chanter. Both Barbour and Chanter had joined the Protectionist Party in 1887 and both were re-elected in 1887 election, were unopposed in 1889 election, and re-elected in 1891.

He was involved in the formation of what would become the Farmers and Settlers Association however he was expelled in 1894 for what were said to be underhanded transactions as a land agent. He did not stand for the 1894 election.

== Death ==
Barbour died in the Sydney suburb of Summer Hill on August 4, 1895 (aged 68) and was survived by his wife, four sons and five daughters.

New South Wales Legislative Assembly
Preceded by William Hay	Member for Murray; 1877–1880	Succeeded by William Hay; Alexander Wilson
Preceded by William Hay	Member for Murray; 1882–1894; Served alongside: Alexander Wilson/John Chanter	Succeeded by James Hayes
