= Matthew Kilpatrick =

Australian politician

Matthew Kilpatrick (8 December 1873 – 13 January 1949) was an Australian politician.

He was born in County Donegal in Ireland, the son of farmer Thomas Kilpatrick and Esther, née Wilson. He arrived in Victoria in July 1874 and quickly moved to the Goulburn Valley, where he farmed dairy cattle until 1890. After moving to the Riverina district and buying a property at Oaklands he married Fanny Pyke in 1899, with whom he had three children. He resumed farming and was on the executive of the Farmers' and Settlers' Association of New South Wales from 1920 to 1921. He married Mary Becker in 1921 with whom he had a further three children. In 1920, Kilpatrick was elected to the New South Wales Legislative Assembly as a Progressive member for Murray. He was a key member of Bruxner's True Blues the beginning of the state's Country Party in 1925. With the reintroduction of single-member districts in 1927 he was elected as the member for Wagga Wagga. He served until his defeat in 1941. Kilpatrick died at Coogee in 1949. He came to Australia with his parents and siblings, arriving in Melbourne on SS Great Britain in July 1874. He was one of 5 brothers and a sister who survived to adulthood. In Wagga a street is named after him. Likewise two of his brothers also have streets with the Kilpatrick name commemorating them, Richard in Shepparton, Victoria and Thomas in Mareeba, Nth Queensland. Richard was a Victorian MLC and Thomas a local councillor.

His biographical entry for the NSW Parliament contains incorrect information regarding his date of birth.

New South Wales Legislative Assembly
Preceded by George Beeby	Member for Murray; 1920–1927; Served alongside: Ball, O'Brien/Goodin	Succeeded by Mat Davidson
New seat	Member for Wagga Wagga; 1927–1941	Succeeded by Eddie Graham
