= Jim Small =

Australian politician (1933–2021)

James Richard Small (22 September 1933 – 29 October 2021) was an Australian politician. He was the National Party member for Murray in the New South Wales Legislative Assembly from 1985 to 1999.

Small was born at Bondi in Sydney. He was educated at Deniliquin and underwent national service 1954–56. He became a bank clerk and then primary producer, and married Judith on 15 October 1955 (they had four children: two sons and two daughters). He was active in the local community and in the local branch of the Country Party for many years.

In 1984, following the resignation of the member for the local state seat of Murray, Tim Fischer, to contest the federal seat of Farrer, Small was selected as the Nationals' candidate for the by-election. He was elected without difficulty, defeating his only opponent, independent candidate Ray Brooks, with a 12.96% margin. He held the seat easily until 1999, when it was combined with the solid Labor seat of Broken Hill to create the new seat of Murray-Darling, a marginal National seat. In the event, both Small and Broken Hill MP Bill Beckroge retired, and the seat was won by Labor.

Small retired for a number of years on his property in Deniliquin and died aged 88 after health complications on 29 October 2021.

New South Wales Legislative Assembly
Preceded by Tim Fischer	Member for Murray; 1985–1999	Succeeded by Abolished
