= Tim Fischer =

Australian politician (1946–2019)

The Honourable Tim Fischer AC FTSE
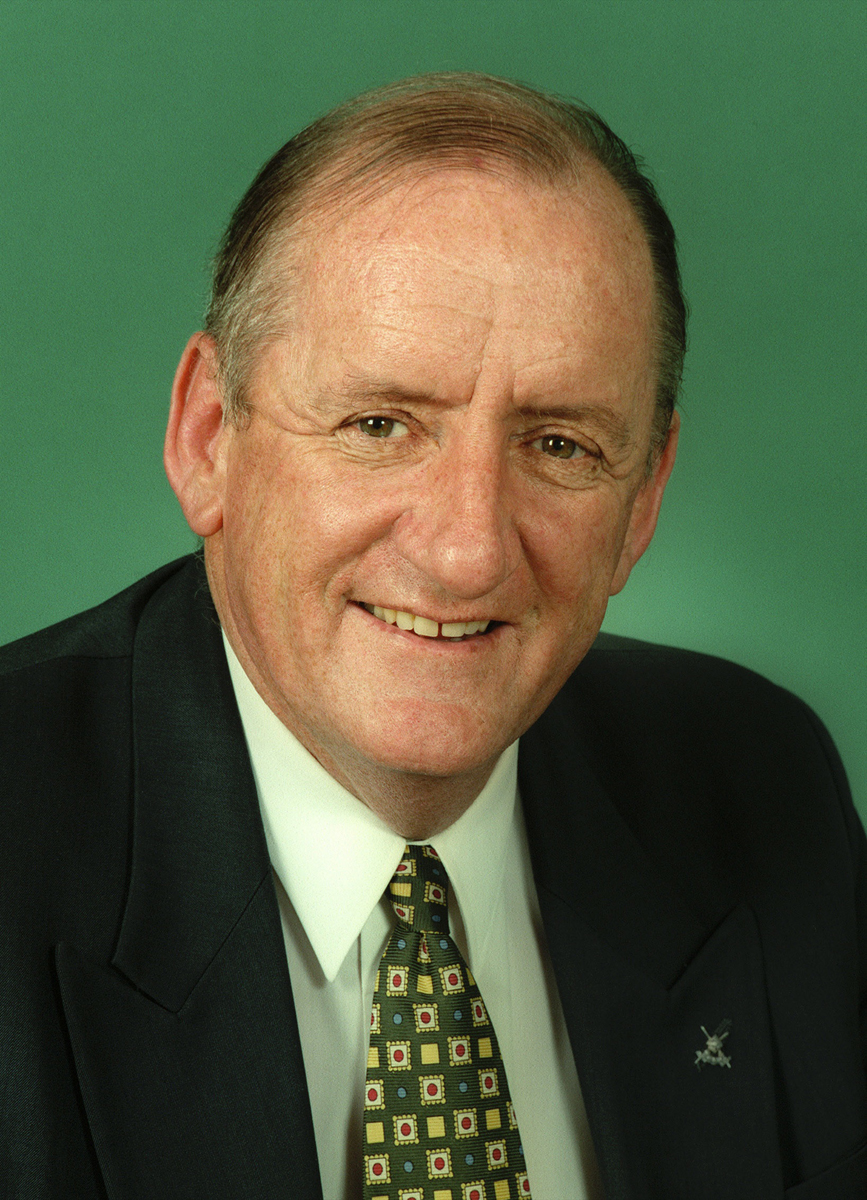
- Official portrait, c. 1996

Deputy Prime Minister of Australia
- In office 11 March 1996 – 20 July 1999
- Prime Minister: John Howard
- Preceded by: Kim Beazley
- Succeeded by: John Anderson

Leader of the National Party
- In office 10 April 1990 – 20 July 1999
- Deputy: Bruce Lloyd; John Anderson
- Preceded by: Charles Blunt
- Succeeded by: John Anderson

Minister for Trade
- In office 11 March 1996 – 20 July 1999
- Prime Minister: John Howard
- Preceded by: Bob McMullan
- Succeeded by: Mark Vaile

Australian Ambassador to the Holy See
- In office 30 January 2009 – 20 January 2012
- Nominated by: Kevin Rudd
- Preceded by: Anne Plunkett
- Succeeded by: John McCarthy

Member of the Australian Parliament for Farrer
- In office 1 December 1984 – 8 October 2001
- Preceded by: Wal Fife
- Succeeded by: Sussan Ley

Member of the New South Wales Parliament for Murray
- In office 13 September 1980 – 18 October 1984
- Preceded by: Mary Meillon
- Succeeded by: Jim Small

Member of the New South Wales Parliament for Sturt
- In office 13 February 1971 – 12 August 1980
- Preceded by: New district
- Succeeded by: John Sullivan

Personal details
- Born: Timothy Andrew Fischer; 3 May 1946 Lockhart, New South Wales, Australia
- Died: 22 August 2019 (aged 73) East Albury, New South Wales, Australia
- Party: National Party of Australia
- Spouse: Judy Brewer (m. 1992)
- Children: 2
- Awards: Companion of the Order of Australia

Military service
- Allegiance: Australia
- Branch/service: Australian Army
- Years of service: 1966–1969
- Rank: Second Lieutenant
- Unit: 1st Battalion, Royal Australian Regiment
- Battles/wars: Vietnam War
- Service number: 2784385

Timothy Andrew Fischer AC FTSE (3 May 1946 – 22 August 2019) was an Australian politician and diplomat who served as leader of the National Party from 1990 to 1999. He was Australia's tenth deputy prime minister, and the first in the Howard government, from 1996 to 1999.

Fischer was born in Lockhart, New South Wales. He served with the Australian Army in the Vietnam War. On his return he bought a farming property at Boree Creek. He served in the New South Wales Legislative Assembly from 1971 to 1984. Fischer was elected to the House of Representatives at the 1984 election, representing the Division of Farrer until his retirement in 2001. He replaced Charles Blunt as leader of the National Party in 1990, and in the Howard government served as Deputy Prime Minister and Minister for Trade. After leaving politics, Fischer served as chairman of Tourism Australia from 2004 to 2007, and was later Ambassador to the Holy See from 2009 to 2012.

== Early life ==
Fischer was born on 3 May 1946 in Lockhart, New South Wales. He was the fourth of five children born to Barbara Mary (née van Cooth) and Julius Ralph Fischer; he was predeceased by an older brother who died of meningitis as an infant. His parents were "from once wealthy Melbourne families whose businesses had collapsed with the onset of the Great Depression". Fischer's father worked as a jackaroo, settling in Boree Creek, New South Wales, in 1936, where he ran a stock and station agency and later bought a small farm. His paternal grandfather was born in Kleve, Germany, and had his assets frozen due to anti-German sentiment during World War I. His paternal grandmother was the daughter of a French seaman. Fischer's mother worked as a nurse prior to her marriage. His maternal grandfather was a Dutch immigrant who married the daughter of Francis Mason, an Irish immigrant who became speaker of the Victorian Legislative Assembly.

Fischer grew up on the family property at Boree Creek and attended Boree Creek Public School for six years. From 1958 he boarded at Xavier College in Melbourne. He graduated in 1963 and won a scholarship to attend university, but returned to Boree Creek to assist his family. In 1966 he was conscripted into the Australian Army and commissioned at the Officer Training Unit, Scheyville. Fischer served with the 1st Battalion, Royal Australian Regiment (1RAR) between July 1966 and March 1969 as a second lieutenant. With his battalion, he served in the Vietnam War. Fischer was wounded in the Battle of Coral-Balmoral in May–June 1968. 1RAR and the 1st Australian Task Force were awarded Unit Citation for Gallantry for their actions Battle of Coral-Balmoral and Fischer was entitled to wear the citation insignia.

Upon his return from Vietnam, Fischer took over the family property at Boree Creek and became active in the Country Party, as the party was then called.

== Career ==
=== State politics ===
Fischer represented Sturt in the New South Wales Legislative Assembly from 1971 to 1980 and Murray from 1980 to 1984. He served on the opposition frontbench from 1978 to 1984.

=== Federal politics ===
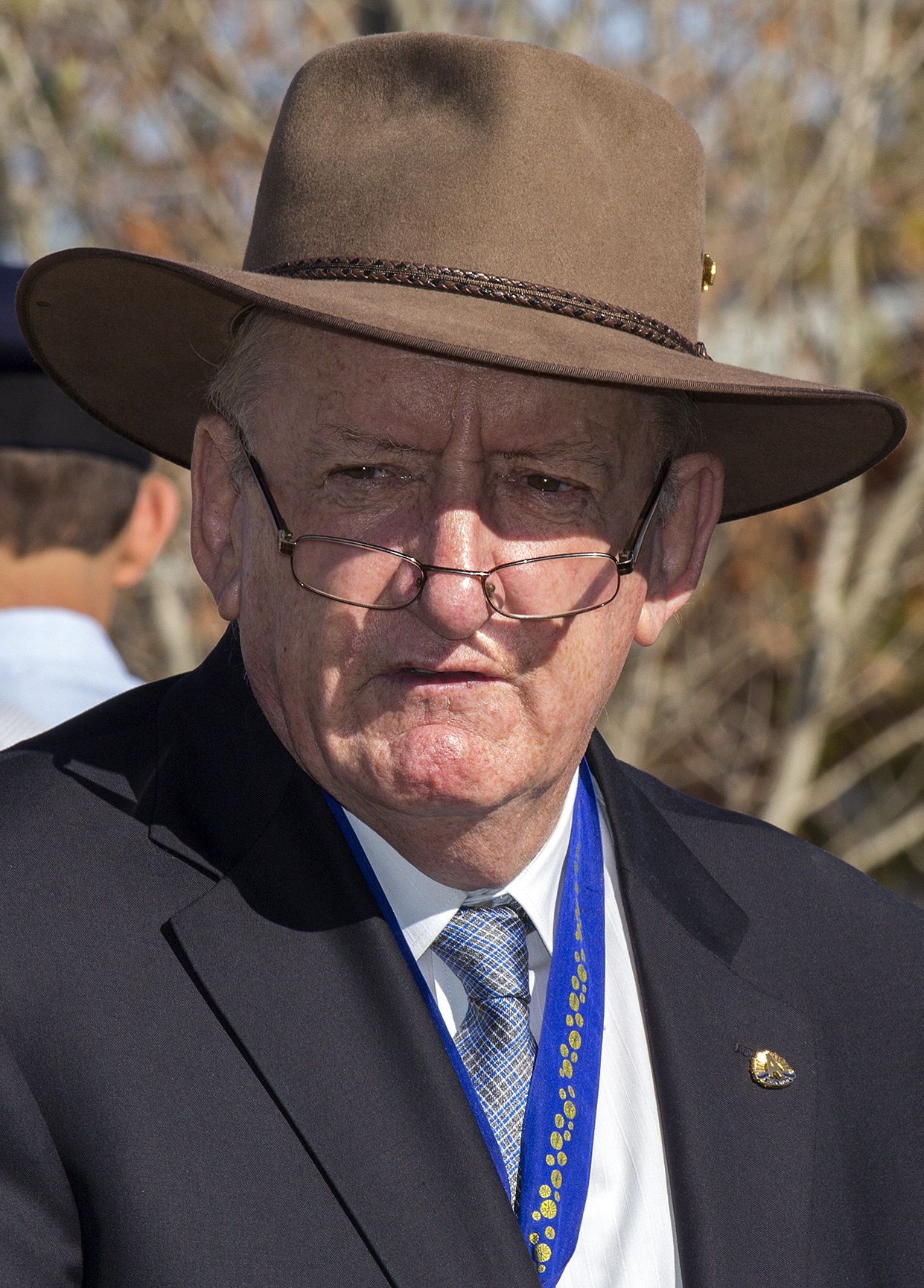
Fischer in 2013

In 1984, Fischer won the federal seat of Farrer in the New South Wales far west for the National Party of Australia, as the Country Party had been renamed. Within a year he was on the opposition frontbench, and soon became a popular figure in both the party and parliament. His sometimes rustic manner and bumbling English concealed a shrewd political brain. In 1990, when an attempt by Charles Blunt to modernise the Nationals' image ended with him losing his own seat, Fischer succeeded him as leader, defeating the former leader Ian Sinclair.

Fischer was an enthusiastic supporter of the "Fightback" package of economic and tax reforms proposed by the Liberal leader John Hewson in 1991. But he was unsuccessful in persuading the majority of rural voters, particularly in Queensland, that the proposed changes, particularly the goods and services tax, were in their interests, and Labor under Paul Keating won the 1993 election. On 23 March 1993, ten days after the election, Ian Sinclair unsuccessfully challenged Fischer for the leadership.

In January 1994, Fischer suffered head and neck injuries in a car accident 15 kilometres (9.3 mi) south of his property in Lockhart, New South Wales. His car T-boned a vehicle that had failed to yield to a give-way sign; the driver and passenger in the other vehicle were killed. Fischer was knocked unconscious in the accident and taken to hospital in Wagga Wagga. He took a month off from politics to aid his recovery, with his deputy John Anderson acting as party leader in his absence.

The Liberals finally regained office under John Howard in 1996. Fischer became Deputy Prime Minister and Minister for Trade. The Liberals had won a majority in their own right in the 1996 election, leaving the Nationals in a much weaker position compared to previous Coalition governments. Nonetheless, Fischer was fairly active. He supported the government introducing tough gun control measures on automatic and semi-automatic weapons following the Port Arthur massacre in April 1996 alongside then-prime minister John Howard, measures which were opposed by much of his party's rural base.

Fischer also had difficulty with the determination of many Liberals, including the Treasurer, Peter Costello, to carry out sweeping free-market reforms, including abolishing tariff protection for rural industries, deregulating petrol prices and implementing other measures which farmers' organisations regarded as harmful to themselves.

In pushing to permanently extinguish native title rights of indigenous Australians following the Mabo and Wik decisions, Fischer attracted much criticism.

Further trouble for Fischer and the Nationals came with the rise of One Nation, a right-wing populist party led by Pauline Hanson, a disendorsed Liberal candidate who was nonetheless elected member for the Queensland seat of Oxley at the 1996 federal election. One Nation had its greatest appeal in country areas of New South Wales and Queensland—the Nationals' traditional heartland. For much of 1997 and 1998, it looked as though One Nation might sweep the Nationals out of existence. In the 1998 election campaign, however, Fischer strongly counter-attacked One Nation, mainly on the grounds of their "flat tax" economic policies, and succeeded in holding the Nationals' losses to one Senate seat in Queensland.

In 2001, shortly before the expiry of his last parliamentary term, Fischer made public his support for an Australian republic in the future.

As an MP, and later as leader of the Nationals, Fischer often had a rather hectic schedule of visits to various rural National branch meetings, and other relevant functions and gatherings. As a result, he earned the affectionate nickname of "Two-Minute Tim" – often he would arrive, speak to the gathering for a few minutes (i.e. the "Two-Minutes"), grab a quick bite to eat while chatting to some of the attendees, then have to head off to the next stop on his schedule.

In 2014 it was revealed on the ABC program A Country Road that sometime before the 1998 federal election, Fischer, then National Party leader, had met with his deputy John Anderson and former minister John Sharp for a luncheon at which they were surprised to learn from each other that they all intended to retire at the forthcoming election. They agreed that it was not a good idea for all of them to retire at the same time, as it could give a negative image to the party which at the time was battling against perceptions that its future was uncertain. In the end, only Sharp retired, with Fischer and Anderson delaying their own retirements and successfully recontesting the election.

In 1999, he surprised his colleagues by resigning as party leader and as a minister, and by announcing that he would retire at the election due in 2001. His decision to quit politics was motivated partly by the demands of his family, in particular that his son Harrison has autism (Fischer himself claimed to have "high functioning" autism, though he was never professionally diagnosed).

Fischer is the only person to have served the entirety of his ministerial career as Deputy Prime Minister.

=== Post-political career ===
After his retirement, he returned to farming at Boree Creek, and became involved in charity work, assisting organisations such as the St Vincent de Paul Society, the Fred Hollows Foundation and Autism New South Wales.

Fischer served as chairman of Tourism Australia from 2004 until 2007. He was made a fellow (FTSE) of the Australian Academy of Technological Sciences and Engineering (ATSE) in 2000. He served as chairman and a patron of the Crawford Fund, an initiative of the ATSE supporting international agricultural research, from 2001 to 2006. He was vice-chair and chair of the Crop Trust (2013–2017) and a "vigorous supporter" of the Svalbard Global Seed Vault. He served as national chairman of the Royal Flying Doctor Service. He also served as founding Patron of Australia for UNHCR (2001–2006), an Australian charity that raises funds for the UN's refugee agency.

Fischer was appointed a Companion of the Order of Australia (AC) in the 2005 Australia Day Honours' List in recognition of his contributions to Australian politics, trade liberalisation, rail transport development, support of humanitarian aid, and to fostering community acceptance of cultural differences.

On 21 July 2008, Fischer was nominated by Prime Minister Kevin Rudd as the first resident Australian Ambassador to the Holy See. Fischer worked closely with the Vatican on all aspects of the canonisation of Australia's first Roman Catholic saint, Mary MacKillop. He retired from the post on 20 January 2012.

In August 2013, following the shooting death of Australian baseball player Christopher Lane in Oklahoma, Fischer called for a tourism boycott of the United States to protest the activities of the National Rifle Association of America and what he felt were overly lax American gun laws.

== Personal life ==
In 1992, Fischer married Judy Brewer. They had two sons.

Fischer was noted as a tireless advocate for rail transport and was probably Australia's best known railfan. He had a childhood hobby of studying rail gauges of the world. After retiring from politics he continued his association with rail as special envoy for the Adelaide to Darwin railway line and travelled on the first freight train and first Ghan passenger train to Darwin in 2004. The V class GT46C locomotive V544, owned and operated by Aurizon, is named after him. In 2007 he led the Rail Freight Network Review into rail freight in Victoria, as commissioned by the Victorian Government.

Between 2008 and 2009, Fischer hosted three series of ABC Local Radio podcasts The Great Train Show, covering a wide range of railway topics from around the world and within Australia.

In October 2018, Fischer was diagnosed with acute myeloid leukaemia. He died on 22 August 2019 at the Albury-Wodonga Cancer Centre in East Albury, New South Wales at age 73. Fischer himself attributed the illness to exposure to Agent Orange during his service in Vietnam. Fischer was given a state funeral, which was held in Albury on 29 August 2019.

== Honours ==
Ribbon	Award	Date awarded	Notes
	Companion of the Order of Australia (AC)	26 January 2005	
	Australian Active Service Medal 1945–1975	with VIETNAM clasp	
	Vietnam Medal		
	Queen Elizabeth II Silver Jubilee Medal	1977	
	Centenary Medal	1 January 2001	
	Australian Defence Medal		
	Anniversary of National Service 1951–1972 Medal		
	Vietnam Campaign Medal (South Vietnam)		
	Grand Cross of the Order of May (Argentina)		
	Grand Cross of the Order of Bernardo O'Higgins (Chile)		
	Grand Officer of the Order of the Southern Cross (Brazil)		
	Knight Commander with Star of the Order of St Gregory the Great (Holy See)	2019	
	Knight Grand Cross of the Order of Pius IX (Holy See)	2012	

== Publications ==
- Fischer, Tim (2000). Seven days in East Timor: Ballot and Bullets. Allen & Unwin. ISBN 978-1-86508-277-6.
- Rees, Peter; Fischer, Tim (2003). Tim Fischer's Outback Heroes: and communities that count. Allen & Unwin. ISBN 978-1-86508-831-0.
- Fischer, Tim (2004). Transcontinental Train Odyssey: the Ghan, the Khyber, the Globe. A personal guide to the great transcontinental railways of the world. Allen & Unwin. ISBN 978-1-74114-450-5.
- Fischer, Tim (2005). Asia & Australia: tango in trade, tourism and transport. University of New England Press. ISBN 978-1-86389-922-2.
- Fischer, Tim (2011). Trains Unlimited. Harper Collins. ISBN 978-0-7304-9740-0.
- Fischer, Tim (2018). Steam Australia: Locomotives that Galvanised the Nation. NLA Publishing. ISBN 978-0-64227-929-3.

== Bibliography ==
- Rees, Peter (2001). The boy from Boree Creek: the Tim Fischer story. Allen & Unwin. ISBN 1-86508-534-0.

New South Wales Legislative Assembly
New title	Member for Sturt; 1971–1980	Succeeded by John Sullivan
Preceded by Mary Meillon	Member for Murray; 1980–1984	Succeeded by Jim Small
Parliament of Australia
Preceded by Wal Fife	Member for Farrer; 1984–2001	Succeeded by Sussan Ley
Party political offices
Preceded by Charles Blunt	Leader of the National Party of Australia; 1990–1999	Succeeded by John Anderson
Political offices
Preceded by Bob McMullan	Minister for Trade; 1996–1999	Succeeded by Mark Vaile
Preceded by Kim Beazley	Deputy Prime Minister of Australia; 1996–1999	Succeeded by John Anderson
Diplomatic posts
Preceded by Anne Plunkett	Australian Ambassador to the Holy See; 2008–2012	Succeeded by John McCarthy
