= Christopher Lethbridge (Australian politician) =

Australian politician

Personal details
- Born: 30 August 1886 Mitchell, Queensland
- Died: 8 March 1981 (aged 94) Port Macquarie, New South Wales
- Party: Independent, Liberal Party

Christopher Baron Lethbridge (30 August 1886 – 8 March 1981) was an Australian politician and a member of the New South Wales Legislative Assembly between 1937 and 1946. He was an Independent member of parliament.

== Early life ==
Lethbridge was born in Mitchell, Queensland and was the son of a clerk. He was educated at Brisbane Grammar School and became an articled clerk. He served with the First Australian Imperial Force in France during World War One. Lethbridge was admitted as a solicitor in 1920 and founded Nicholson and Lethbridge, a law firm in Corowa where he was noted for his legal representation of soldier settlers. Lethbridge was involved in community organizations including the Ambulance Board and the Corowa Race club. Lethbridge also developed a farm,'Barondale' in the Corowa region.

== State Parliament ==
Lethbridge entered parliament as the Independent member for Corowa after he won the November 1937 by-election caused by the death of the former Country Party member Richard Ball. Labor did not contest the by-election but supported Lethbridge, which raised accusations that he was a Labor Party stooge. This impression was heightened when Lethbridge joined Labor members and rebel United Australia Party members in August 1939 to pass a motion of no confidence in the Premier Bertram Stevens which brought down Stevens' government. Lethbridge's vote gave Stevens' opponents their 1-vote victory. However, Lethbridge generally voted with the conservative parties and after 1939 he was considered to be a conservative independent. He retained the seat with this designation until he joined the nascent Liberal Party in July 1946. The next month he resigned from parliament to contest the seat of Division of Riverina at the 1946 federal election as the Liberal candidate. He came third behind the Australian Labor Party's incumbent Joe Langtry and the Country Party's Hugh Roberton. He contested the by-election for Corowa, caused by his resignation, as the Liberal candidate but was easily defeated by the endorsed Country Party candidate Ebenezer Kendell. Lethbridge then retired from public life. He did not hold caucus, parliamentary or ministerial office.

New South Wales Legislative Assembly
Preceded by Richard Ball	Member for Corowa; 1937–1946	Succeeded by Ebenezer Kendell
