= William Hay (Australian politician) =

Australian politician (1816–1908)

William Hay (1816 – 14 November 1908) was an Australian politician.

== Early life ==
Hay was born in Banffshire, Scotland, educated at the University of Aberdeen and arrived in Sydney in 1838.

== Parliamentary career ==
He was elected as the member for the Murray in the New South Wales Legislative Assembly in 1872 and held the seat until 1877. He held it again from 1880 to 1882. Hay won the seat at the 1872 by-election caused by the resignation of Patrick Jennings.

He was re-elected at the 1874–75 election, but did not contest the 1877 election. Murray became a two-member electorate for the 1880 election and Hay was elected along with Alexander Wilson. Hay did not contest the 1882 election.

== Death ==
Hay died in the Melbourne suburb of Brighton on 14 November 1908 (aged 91–92).

New South Wales Legislative Assembly
| Preceded by Patrick Jennings | Member for Murray; 1872–1877 | Succeeded by Robert Barbour |
| Preceded by Robert Barbour | Member for Murray; 1880–1882; Served alongside: Alexander Wilson | Succeeded by Robert Barbour |
