= Mary Meillon =

Australian politician

Mary Mellon (née Lawson; 4 October 1919 – 8 June 1980) was an Australian politician. She was the Liberal member for Murray in the New South Wales Legislative Assembly from 1973 to 1980.

Born Mary Lawson in Deniliquin, her father Joe Lawson was also a New South Wales politician. She attended Hornsby Girls High School before working as a stenographer. She married Francis Meillon on 5 September 1942, with whom she had one son and two daughters.

When her father, the member for Murray in the New South Wales Legislative Assembly, died in 1973, Meillon was selected as the Liberal Party's candidate for the by-election to replace him (Joe Lawson had been an ex-Country Party Independent). She narrowly defeated the Country Party's candidate, Bruce Jeffery, who later represented the Oxley and Port Macquarie electorates. Meillon was the fourth woman elected to the assembly, the first Liberal woman, and the first woman to win a seat since 1946. Defeating an independent Jeffery in the 1973 state election, she held the seat against challenges from Independent Country candidates (since the Coalition agreement prohibited the party from endorsing candidates to run against sitting Liberals) until her death in Sydney in 1980; the by-election to replace her was won by future federal Nationals leader Tim Fischer.

New South Wales Legislative Assembly
Preceded by Joe Lawson	Member for Murray; 1973–1980	Succeeded by Tim Fischer
