= State of Riverina =

Australian state proposal

The State of Riverina is a proposed state of Australia, to be formed out of the current Riverina region in New South Wales and Victoria.

Support for separation of the Riverina from the rest of New South Wales dates back to the 19th century. Following World War I, a Riverina New State League operated from 1921 to 1923. The Riverina Movement was one of a number of new state movements that emerged in Australia in the 1920s.

== Riverina Movement ==
Badge of the Riverina Movement

The Riverina Movement was a short-lived movement that advocated the creation of the State of Riverina.

The official launch of the movement occurred at a riverside rally in Wagga Wagga on 28 February 1931.

An official badge was created for the movement, based on the Australian Army's Rising Sun badge with the addition of an Australian flag emblazoned with a capital "R" for Riverina. The badges, manufactured by Angus & Coote, were sold by the movement's women's auxiliary.

At the 1932 New South Wales state election, six members of the Riverina Movement were elected to state parliament - five Country Party MLA's, one United Australia Party MLA, and one Country Party MLC. Hardy was elected to the Senate at the 1931 federal election.

== Riverina State Party ==
Riverina State Party Riverina State Group
- Abbreviation: RSP; RSG
- Leader: David Landini
- Founder: David Landini
- Founded: 1 December 2018
- Split from: National Party
- Headquarters: Riverina, New South Wales
- Membership (2025): 1,646
- Ideology: Riverina statehood
- Colours: Creamsicle orange Poseidon blue Bright maroon

The Riverina State Party (RSP) or Riverina State Group (RSG) is an Australian political party founded in support of the creation of a State of Riverina out of the Riverina region of NSW and parts of regional Victoria.

The party was founded in 2018 by David Landini, a former National Party member who also served briefly as a Wakool Shire councillor in 2016.

Landini received 2.07% of the vote in the seat of Murray at the 2019 New South Wales state election, running on behalf of the RSP. He increased his vote to 2.40% at the 2023 state election.

In March 2025, the party had 1400 members. When it applied for federal level registration on 17 October 2025, the application included a membership of 1,646.

== Politics of Riverina ==
Riverina is home to a large number of electorates at both a state and federal level. Riverina federal seats include, or partially include as of 2026

- Farrer (One Nation Held),
- Riverina (National Held),

State seats include, or partially include as of 2025

- Albury (Liberal held)
- Cootamundra (National held)
- Murray (Independent held)
- Wagga Wagga (Independent held)
