= Richard Ball (Australian politician) =

Politician and engineer in New South Wales, Australia

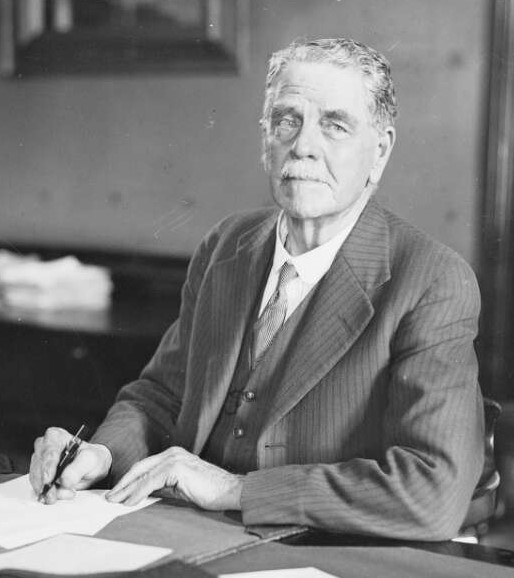
Ball in 1930

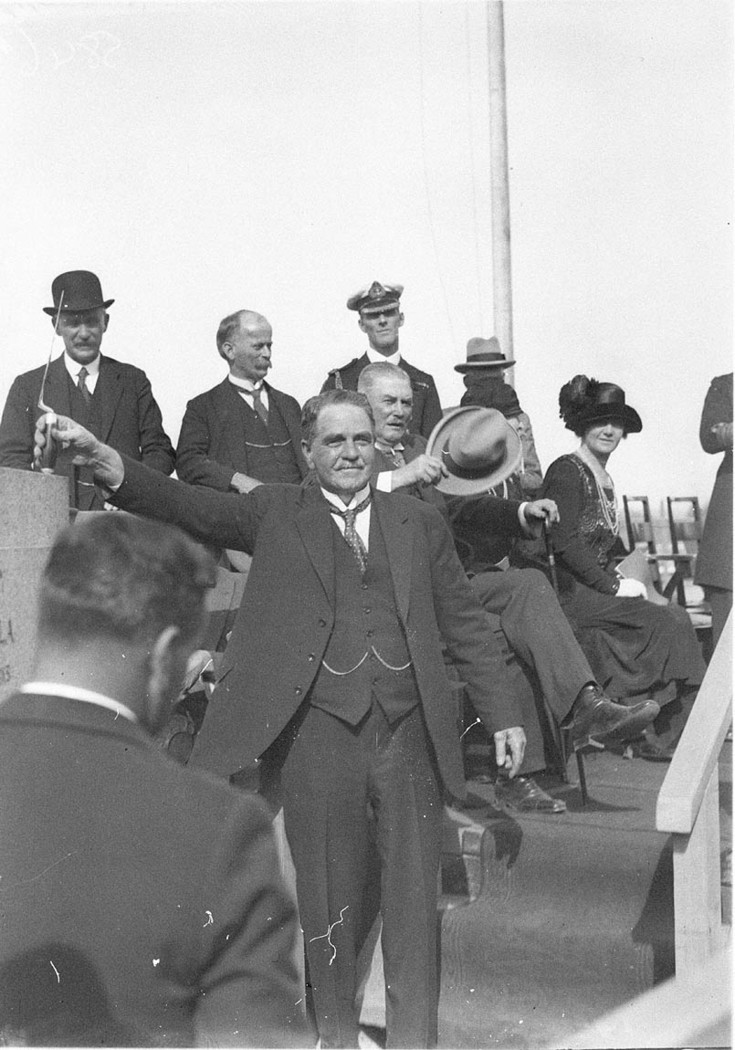
Ball lays the foundation stone for the Sydney Harbour Bridge

Richard Thomas Ball (14 September 1857 – 30 October 1937), invariably referred to as R. T. Ball, was a politician and engineer in New South Wales, Australia.

== Early life ==
He was born in Sydney to farmer George Ball and Ann, née Hooper and spent his early years at the family farm in Rooty Hill. After attending primary school at Eastern Creek, he worked for several engineering companies and as a blacksmith. In 1880 he was charged with attempting to bribe Henry Parkes, the Colonial Secretary, asking for employment and offering a bonus of £50. He pleaded guilty and was not convicted on entering his own recognisance of £80 to appear when called upon.

He purchased Burn and Sons foundry at Goulburn in 1881. He established his own company in 1885, but was bankrupted in 1894. Ball served on Goulburn Council from 1887 to 1894, and was mayor from 1890 to 1891. After being discharged from bankruptcy he moved to Albury to be involved in the building of the waterworks. In 1898, he moved to Sydney, to practice as a mechanical engineer.

== Political career ==
Ball was elected to the New South Wales Legislative Assembly as the representative for Albury in 1895 as a Free Trade member. He was defeated in 1898 by 39 votes (2.4%), largely due to his opposition to elements of the federation proposal.

In 1904, Ball returned to the Legislative Assembly as a member for Corowa, initially as a Liberal Reform member, switching to the Farmers and Settlers party in 1913 before joining William Holman's grand coalition which coalesced into the Nationalist Party in 1917. He served until the introduction of proportional representation in 1920. Albury was merged into Murray and Ball was elected as one of three members. After single-member districts were re-introduced in 1927 he returned to his old seat of Corowa, He was a supporter of the Riverina new state movement. He joined the United Australia Party in 1931 but the following year he defected to its coalition partner, the Country Party. There were 2 Country Party candidates for the 1932 election for Corowa and Ball retained the seat by just 1 vote after 72% of Lang Labor preferences went to the other Country Party candidate.

In November 1916 Ball was appointed Secretary for Public Works and Minister for Railways in the second Holman ministry. He was briefly Minister for Agriculture in the second Fuller ministry from April to June 1922 before resuming his old position as Secretary for Public Works, Minister for Railways and assuming additional responsibilities for State Industrial Enterprises and Housing, in which he served until the government's defeat in 1925. He was responsible for passing through Parliament the Act authorising the construction of the Sydney Harbour Bridge, and signing the contract for its erection. In 1927 he was appointed Minister for Lands in the Bavin ministry.

== Personal life and death ==
On 6 May 1880 Ball married Esther Arnold, with whom he had four children. Ester died on 27 August 1920 (aged 63). On 26 January 1926 he married Lillie May Hume.

Ball died at Marrickville on 30 October 1937 (aged 80).

Parliament of New South Wales
Political offices
| Preceded by John Cann | Secretary for Public Works; 1916 – 1920 | Succeeded by John Estell |
| New office | Minister for Railways; 1916 – 1920 | Succeeded by John Estell |
| Preceded by Bill Dunn | Minister for Agriculture; 1922 | Succeeded by Frank Chaffey |
| Preceded by Sir Thomas Henley | Secretary for Public Works; Minister for Railways and State Industrial Enterprises; 1922– 1925 | Succeeded by Martin Flannery as Secretary for Public Works; Minister for Railways |
| Preceded by Sir Thomas Henley | Minister for Housing; 1922 – 1925 | Vacant Title next held by James McGirr |
| Preceded by Ted Horsington | Minister for Lands; 1927 – 1930 | Succeeded by Jack Tully |
New South Wales Legislative Assembly
| Preceded by John Wilkinson | Member for Albury; 1895–1898 | Succeeded by Thomas Griffith |
| New district | Member for Corowa; 1904–1920 | District abolished |
| Preceded by Brian Doe | Member for Murray; 1920–1927; With: George Beeby / Matthew Kilpatrick; William O'Brien / Vern Goodin | Succeeded by Mat Davidson |
| New district | Member for Corowa; 1927–1937 | Succeeded by Christopher Lethbridge |
Civic offices
| Preceded by Henry Gannon | Mayor of Goulburn; 1890 – 1891 | Succeeded by E Howard |
