= Electoral district of Corowa =

State electoral district of New South Wales, Australia

Corowa was an electoral district of the Legislative Assembly of the Australian state of New South Wales, taking its name from town of Corowa on the Murray River.

== History ==
The district was created in the 1904 re-distribution of electorates following the 1903 New South Wales referendum, which required the number of members of the Legislative Assembly to be reduced from 125 to 90. It consisted of parts of Albury, The Murray and the abolished seat of The Hume. It moved west in 1913, absorbing the eastern part of the abolished district of Deniliquin and losing its eastern part to the districts of Albury and Wagga Wagga.

In 1920, with the introduction of proportional representation, Corowa, Albury and Wagga Wagga were absorbed into Murray and elected four members. At the end of proportional representation in 1927, Corowa was recreated ran through until 1950 until it was abolished.

== Members for Corowa ==
First incarnation (1904–1920)
Member	Party	Term
Richard Ball	Liberal Reform	1904–1917
Richard Ball	Nationalist	1917–1920
Second incarnation (1927–1950)
Member	Party	Term
Richard Ball	Nationalist	1927–1931
Richard Ball	Country	1931–1937
Christopher Lethbridge	Independent	1937–1946
Ebenezer Kendell	Country	1946–1950

== Election results ==
1947 New South Wales state election: Corowa
Party	Candidate	Votes	%	±%
Country	Ebenezer Kendell	7,638	63.7	+29.8
Labor	James Adam	4,352	36.3	+7.0
Total formal votes		11,990	99.1	+1.3
Informal votes		111	0.9	−1.3
Turnout		12,101	93.1	+4.6
Country gain from Independent		Swing	N/A	

Ebenezer Kendell (Country) had won the seat at the 1946 by-election following the resignation of Christopher Lethbridge (Independent).
