= Electoral district of Murray =

Electoral district in Australia

Murray New South Wales—Legislative Assembly
- Interactive map of district boundaries from the 2023 state election
- State: New South Wales
- Dates current: 1859–1999; 2015–present
- MP: Helen Dalton
- Party: Independent
- Namesake: Murray River
- Electors: 59,138 (2023)
- Area: 107,362.20 km^{2} (41,452.8 sq mi)
- Demographic: Rural
Electorates around Murray:
Barwon	Barwon	Barwon
South Australia	Murray	Cootamundra; Albury
South Australia	Victoria	Victoria

Murray (The Murray until 1910) is an electoral district in the Australian state of New South Wales.

Murray is a regional electorate lying in the southwestern corner of the state. It encompasses several local government areas, namely Wentworth Shire, Balranald Shire, Carrathool Shire, the City of Griffith, Leeton Shire, Hay Shire, Murrumbidgee Shire, Murray River Council, Edward River Council and Berrigan Shire.

== History ==
Murray was a single-member electorate from 1859 to 1880, returning two members from 1880 to 1894, returning to a single member electorate from 1894 to 1920. The district created in 1859 included the districts surrounding the towns of Deniliquin, Moama and Moulamein. It was substantially re-created in 1904 as a result of the 1903 New South Wales referendum, which required the number of members of the Legislative Assembly to be reduced from 125 to 90. The member for The Murray from 1894 to 1904 was James Hayes who was appointed to the Legislative Council and did not contest the election.

The district re-created in 1904 consisted of the abolished seat of Wentworth and parts of The Lachlan and the abolished seat of Hay. The member for Wentworth was Robert Scobie (Labour). The member for The Lachlan was James Carroll (Progressive) who unsuccessfully contested that seat. The member for Hay was Frank Byrne who did not contest the election.

From 1920 to 1927 it returned three members, having merged with Albury, Corowa and Wagga Wagga, voting by proportional representation. It returned to being a single-member electorate from 1927. Murray was abolished in 1999 when it was merged with Broken Hill to create Murray-Darling.

Murray was recreated for the 2015 state election, combining the southern part of the abolished district of Murray-Darling and the western part of the abolished district of Murrumbidgee.

== Members for Murray ==
First incarnation (1859–1999)
Single member (1859–1880)
Member	Party	Term						
John Hay	None	1859–1864						
Robert Landale	None	1864–1869						
Patrick Jennings	None	1869–1872						
William Hay	None	1872–1877						
Robert Barbour	None	1877–1880						
Two members (1880–1894)
Member	Party	Term	Member	Party	Term			
William Hay	None	1880–1882	Alexander Wilson	None	1880–1885			
Robert Barbour	None	1882–1887	Alexander Wilson	None	1880–1885			
Robert Barbour	None	1882–1887	John Chanter	None	1885–1887			
Robert Barbour	Protectionist	1887–1894	John Chanter	Protectionist	1887–1894			
Single member (1894–1920)
Member	Party	Term						
James Hayes	Protectionist	1894–1901						
James Hayes	Progressive	1901–1904						
Robert Scobie	Labour	1904–1917						
Robert Scobie	Nationalist	1917–1917						
Brian Doe	Nationalist	1917–1920						
Three members (1920–1927)
Member	Party	Term	Member	Party	Term	Member	Party	Term
George Beeby	Progressive	1920–1920	William O'Brien	Labor	1920–1925	Richard Ball	Nationalist	1920–1927
Matthew Kilpatrick	Progressive	1920–1925	William O'Brien	Labor	1920–1925	Richard Ball	Nationalist	1920–1927
Matthew Kilpatrick	Country	1925—1927	Vern Goodin	Labor	1925–1927	Richard Ball	Nationalist	1920–1927
Matthew Kilpatrick	Country	1925—1927	Vern Goodin	Independent	1927–1927	Richard Ball	Nationalist	1920–1927
Single member (1927–1999)
Member	Party	Term						
Mat Davidson	Labor	1927–1930						
John Donovan	Labor	1930–1932						
Joe Lawson	Country	1932–1968						
Joe Lawson	Independent	1968–1973						
Mary Meillon	Liberal	1973–1980						
Tim Fischer	National	1980–1984						
Jim Small	National	1985–1999						
Second incarnation (2015–present)
Member	Party	Term						
Adrian Piccoli	National	2015–2017						
Austin Evans	National	2017–2019						
Helen Dalton	Shooters, Fishers, Farmers	2019–2022						
Helen Dalton	Independent	2022–present						

== Election results ==
2023 New South Wales state election: Murray
Party	Candidate	Votes	%	±%
Independent	Helen Dalton	24,824	50.2	+50.2
National	Peta Betts	12,974	26.3	−8.4
Labor	Max Buljubasic	4,124	8.3	−0.7
Shooters, Fishers, Farmers	Desiree Gregory	2,369	4.8	−33.3
Legalise Cannabis	Adrian Carle	1,840	3.7	+3.7
Ind. Riverina State	David Landini	1,207	2.4	+0.3
Greens	Amelia King	913	1.8	−0.8
Public Education	Kevin Farrell	446	0.9	+0.9
Sustainable Australia	Michael Florance	404	0.8	−0.3
Independent	Greg Adamson	314	0.6	+0.6
Total formal votes		49,415	96.8	+0.7
Informal votes		1,631	3.2	−0.7
Turnout		51,046	86.3	−1.8
Notional two-party-preferred count
National	Peta Betts	17,003	72.1	−2.7
Labor	Max Buljubasic	6,570	27.9	+2.7
Two-candidate-preferred result
Independent	Helen Dalton	27,260	66.0	+66.0
National	Peta Betts	14,035	34.0	−13.2
Member changed to Independent from Shooters, Fishers, Farmers				
