= Joe Lawson (politician) =

Australian politician

Joseph Alexander Lawson (27 July 1893 – 14 August 1973) was an Australian politician, elected as a member of the New South Wales Legislative Assembly.

Lawson was born in Kanyapella, Victoria, the fourth child of James Bell Lawson and Mary Beattie, and educated at Deniliquin public school, following a brief period being educated by his grandmother (Johanne Beattie) in Echuca, Victoria. He left school one or two years later (aged about 9), to work on the family farm, but he was an avid reader, with a great love of the Australian poets, Dickens, Burns and many other writers. In his later years, he could still recite a great many poems from memory, not least The Man from Snowy River. In his early twenties, he bought a mixed farming property, Oakwood, about 6 miles south of Deniliquin. He volunteered for the First AIF in 1915, but despite his fitness he was not accepted, because he had flat feet and two fingers on his left hand joined by a piece of skin. He married Mary Linus Gain on 12 June 1917 and they had three daughters Mary (known as 'Tib') (dec.), Valda (dec.), and Margaret (dec.) and two sons James (dec.) and George (dec.).

A noted athlete, he played football (Australian Rules Football) and ran as a sprinter in the Victorian Championships and the Stawell Gift. Having been a horse breeder and breaker, he also exhibited prize-winning Clydesdales at the Royal Melbourne Show, as well as having a great interest in horse racing. He became a stock and station agent in Deniliquin in the early 1920s, and was active in the local debating society, the Australian Wheatgrowers Federation, the Pastures Protection Board, the Victorian Producers Co-operative Society, and was a director of the Deniliquin Hospital Board. He was elected as an alderman of Deniliquin Council from 1925 until 1932 and was mayor from 1931 until 1932.

The big issues in the 1930s were the plight of farmers in the Great Depression, particularly soldier-settlers, and the need for development of farming land, in particular through irrigation. Lawson championed the extension of irrigation, and was honoured by having the Lawson Syphon (where the Mulwala Canal passes underneath the Edward River) named for him. He also fought to allow farmers in the Murray region to grow rice, which has since become a major crop in the area. He was a very active supporter of schools in his electorate, and a great believer in the importance of education.

Lawson won the seat of Murray for the Country Party on 12 June 1932. His maiden speech, in September, 1932, was on the Farmer's Relief Bill, and the Sydney Morning Herald wrote "One of the most interesting [speeches] was made by Mr. Lawson, a Riverina farmer. The House listened with intense interest to this man from the land as he related from personal knowledge and with much feeling, the plight of the farmers".

In 1967, he lost the Country Party pre-selection in questionable circumstances, but ran as an Independent, winning the seat at the 1968 and 1971 elections.

Joe Lawson was always a strong supporter of the farmers in his electorate. In one incident in the 1950s, he personally investigated farmer's concerns about citrus fruit being declared 'dry' at the Sydney Markets. He discovered a racket where some Government fruit inspectors would declare a shipment of oranges to be dry (without juice), which led to them being sold at a greatly reduced price to associates of the inspectors in the retail trade, who could sell them at regular retail prices. The inspectors received a percentage of the profits. Joe Lawson revealed this racket in the Parliament, producing supposedly 'dry' fruit he had bought, and detailing the circumstances of the racket, thus forcing the Government to take rapid action and re-organize the markets.

Joe Lawson held the seat of Murray continuously until his death in 1973. He was succeeded in the seat by his daughter, Mary Meillon. He had had a minor heart attack and was admitted to hospital three days later, but died of a second massive heart attack as he was being taken into the ward. He had just finished giving some instructions to his parliamentary amanuensis. He died in the Sydney suburb of North Sydney, New South Wales. His wife, Mary, had died suddenly in 1970. Joe Lawson was survived by his five children and thirteen grandchildren.

Joe Lawson was the longest continuously serving member of the New South Wales Legislative Assembly, and one of the longest continuously serving parliamentarians in the world (41 years). He won the seat of Murray at 14 consecutive elections. When he entered parliament at the age of 38, he was the youngest MLA. At his death he was the oldest, the "Father of the House" at 80 years of age.

New South Wales Legislative Assembly
Preceded by John Donovan	Member for Murray; 1932–1973	Succeeded by Mary Meillon
