= Results of the 2019 New South Wales Legislative Assembly election =

State election for New South Wales, Australia in March 2019

New South Wales state election, 23 March 2019 Legislative Assembly << 2015–2023 >>
Enrolled voters	5,271,775				
Votes cast	4,714,783		Turnout	89.43	−1.05
Informal votes	162,897		Informal	3.46	+0.02
Summary of votes by party
Party	Primary votes	%	Swing	Seats	Change
Labor	1,516,143	33.31	−0.77	36	+2
Liberal	1,456,010	31.99	−3.10	35	−2
National	436,806	9.60	−0.95	13	−4
Greens	435,401	9.57	−0.72	3	±0
Shooters, Fishers, Farmers	157,636	3.46	+3.46	3	+3
Sustainable Australia	69,831	1.53	+1.53	0	±0
Keep Sydney Open	69,076	1.52	+1.52	0	±0
Animal Justice	68,802	1.51	+1.39	0	±0
One Nation	49,948	1.10	+1.10	0	±0
Christian Democrats	36,575	0.80	−2.31	0	±0
Conservatives	22,590	0.50	+0.50	0	±0
Liberal Democrats	10,530	0.23	+0.23	0	±0
Small Business	3,355	0.07	+0.07	0	±0
Socialist Alliance	1,208	0.03	−0.05	0	±0
Flux	698	0.02	+0.02	0	±0
Independent	216,510	4.76	+0.63	3	+1
Other	767	0.02	−0.20	0	±0
Total	4,551,886			93	
Two-party-preferred
Coalition	2,053,185	52.02	−2.30		
Labor	1,893,618	47.98	+2.30		

This is a list of electoral district results for the 2019 New South Wales state election.

== Results by district ==
=== Albury ===
2019 New South Wales state election: Albury
Party	Candidate	Votes	%	±%
Liberal	Justin Clancy	27,039	56.77	−1.06
Labor	Lauriston Muirhead	11,840	24.86	−6.83
Greens	Dean Moss	4,411	9.26	+3.64
Sustainable Australia	Ross Hamilton	3,335	7.00	+7.00
Keep Sydney Open	Reuben McNair	1,007	2.11	+2.11
Total formal votes		47,632	95.22	−1.28
Informal votes		2,393	4.78	+1.28
Turnout		50,025	86.84	−1.06
Two-party-preferred result
Liberal	Justin Clancy	28,258	65.98	+2.75
Labor	Lauriston Muirhead	14,572	34.02	−2.75
Liberal hold		Swing	+2.75	

=== Auburn ===
2019 New South Wales state election: Auburn
Party	Candidate	Votes	%	±%
Labor	Lynda Voltz	22,396	49.94	+5.40
Liberal	Kyoung Hee (Christina) Kang	16,094	35.89	+0.55
Greens	Janet Castle	3,357	7.49	+1.42
Independent	Luke Ahern	1,635	3.65	+3.65
Keep Sydney Open	Kieron Lee	1,360	3.03	+3.03
Total formal votes		44,842	93.97	−0.50
Informal votes		2,875	6.03	+0.50
Turnout		47,717	86.23	−0.78
Two-party-preferred result
Labor	Lynda Voltz	24,419	59.13	+3.20
Liberal	Kyoung Hee (Christina) Kang	16,876	40.87	−3.20
Labor hold		Swing	+3.20	

=== Ballina ===
2019 New South Wales state election: Ballina
Party	Candidate	Votes	%	±%
National	Ben Franklin	18,550	37.01	+0.36
Greens	Tamara Smith	15,895	31.71	+4.69
Labor	Asren Pugh	12,457	24.85	+0.12
Animal Justice	Cathy Blasonato	1,256	2.51	+2.51
Sustainable Australia	Lisa McDermott	1,119	2.23	+2.23
Keep Sydney Open	James Wright	850	1.70	+1.70
Total formal votes		50,127	97.36	−0.29
Informal votes		1,359	2.64	+0.29
Turnout		51,486	86.78	−1.65
Two-party-preferred result
Labor	Asren Pugh	23,657	54.31	+1.28
National	Ben Franklin	19,904	45.69	−1.28
Two-candidate-preferred result
Greens	Tamara Smith	24,645	55.42	+2.26
National	Ben Franklin	19,824	44.58	−2.26
Greens hold		Swing	+2.26	

=== Balmain ===
2019 New South Wales state election: Balmain
Party	Candidate	Votes	%	±%
Greens	Jamie Parker	21,065	42.73	+5.34
Labor	Elly Howse	14,227	28.86	−2.94
Liberal	Wenjie (Ben) Zhang	9,875	20.03	−4.85
Keep Sydney Open	Emilia Leonetti	2,268	4.60	+4.60
Animal Justice	Anita Finlayson	1,103	2.24	+0.29
Sustainable Australia	Angela Dunnett	761	1.54	+1.54
Total formal votes		49,299	98.44	+0.52
Informal votes		781	1.56	−0.52
Turnout		50,080	86.73	−1.60
Two-party-preferred result
Labor	Elly Howse	28,127	70.45	+4.70
Liberal	Wenjie (Ben) Zhang	11,795	29.55	−4.70
Two-candidate-preferred result
Greens	Jamie Parker	24,074	60.02	+5.29
Labor	Elly Howse	16,037	39.98	−5.29
Greens hold		Swing	+5.29	

=== Bankstown ===
2019 New South Wales state election: Bankstown
Party	Candidate	Votes	%	±%
Labor	Tania Mihailuk	23,897	54.65	−1.68
Liberal	George Zakhia	13,293	30.40	−0.85
Independent	Saud Abu-Samen	3,856	8.82	+8.82
Greens	James Rooney	2,684	6.14	+1.70
Total formal votes		43,730	93.85	−0.06
Informal votes		2,867	6.15	+0.06
Turnout		46,597	86.12	−0.86
Two-party-preferred result
Labor	Tania Mihailuk	25,735	63.82	−0.15
Liberal	George Zakhia	14,590	36.18	+0.15
Labor hold		Swing	−0.15	

=== Barwon ===
2019 New South Wales state election: Barwon
Party	Candidate	Votes	%	±%
Shooters, Fishers, Farmers	Roy Butler	15,218	32.96	+32.96
National	Andrew Schier	14,027	30.38	−18.72
Labor	Darriea Turley	9,661	20.92	−3.08
Independent	Phil Naden	2,565	5.56	+5.56
Liberal Democrats	Andrew Fleisher	1,571	3.40	+3.40
Greens	Leigh Williams	1,395	3.02	−3.15
Independent	Owen Whyman	735	1.59	+1.59
Animal Justice	Jason Alan	558	1.21	+1.21
Sustainable Australia	Maree McDonald-Pritchard	444	0.96	+0.96
Total formal votes		46,174	96.45	−0.17
Informal votes		1,701	3.55	+0.17
Turnout		47,875	86.80	−0.82
Two-party-preferred result
National	Andrew Schier	16,483	52.52	−10.37
Labor	Darriea Turley	14,904	47.48	+10.37
Two-candidate-preferred result
Shooters, Fishers, Farmers	Roy Butler	19,901	56.60	+56.60
National	Andrew Schier	15,258	43.40	−19.48
Shooters, Fishers, Farmers gain from National				

=== Bathurst ===
2019 New South Wales state election: Bathurst
Party	Candidate	Votes	%	±%
National	Paul Toole	28,030	55.14	−4.75
Labor	Beau Riley	10,438	20.53	−6.84
Shooters, Fishers, Farmers	Brenden May	7,498	14.75	+14.75
Greens	David Harvey	2,815	5.54	−3.58
Sustainable Australia	Michael Begg	1,317	2.59	+2.59
Keep Sydney Open	Timothy Hansen	735	1.45	+1.45
Total formal votes		50,833	97.00	−0.37
Informal votes		1,574	3.00	+0.37
Turnout		52,407	92.20	−0.14
Two-party-preferred result
National	Paul Toole	30,130	67.90	+2.08
Labor	Beau Riley	14,242	32.10	−2.08
National hold		Swing	+2.08	

=== Baulkham Hills ===
2019 New South Wales state election: Baulkham Hills
Party	Candidate	Votes	%	±%
Liberal	David Elliott	30,040	59.71	−4.82
Labor	Ryan Tracey	11,600	23.06	+0.89
Greens	Erica Hockley	3,937	7.83	−0.08
Christian Democrats	Craig Hall	1,868	3.71	+0.29
Animal Justice	Linda Newfield	1,485	2.95	+2.95
Sustainable Australia	Heather Boyd	1,380	2.74	+2.74
Total formal votes		50,310	97.48	+0.22
Informal votes		1,302	2.52	−0.22
Turnout		51,612	92.89	−0.92
Two-party-preferred result
Liberal	David Elliott	31,658	68.68	−3.11
Labor	Ryan Tracey	14,434	31.32	+3.11
Liberal hold		Swing	−3.11	

=== Bega ===
2019 New South Wales state election: Bega
Party	Candidate	Votes	%	±%
Liberal	Andrew Constance	24,796	48.91	−4.33
Labor	Leanne Atkinson	15,508	30.59	−2.25
Greens	William Douglas	4,945	9.75	−0.35
Shooters, Fishers, Farmers	Eric Thomas	3,275	6.46	+6.46
Animal Justice	Coral Anderson	1,371	2.70	+2.70
Conservatives	Joshua Shoobridge	806	1.59	+1.59
Total formal votes		50,701	97.18	+0.09
Informal votes		1,472	2.82	−0.09
Turnout		52,173	89.75	−0.32
Two-party-preferred result
Liberal	Andrew Constance	26,210	56.93	−1.26
Labor	Leanne Atkinson	19,830	43.07	+1.26
Liberal hold		Swing	−1.26	

=== Blacktown ===
2019 New South Wales state election: Blacktown
Party	Candidate	Votes	%	±%
Labor	Stephen Bali	25,618	54.61	+0.76
Liberal	Allan Green	11,668	24.87	−5.93
One Nation	Amit Batish	3,368	7.18	+7.18
Christian Democrats	Josh Green	3,287	7.01	+1.06
Greens	Kirsten Gibbs	2,968	6.33	−0.02
Total formal votes		46,909	96.02	+0.69
Informal votes		1,942	3.98	−0.69
Turnout		48,851	88.80	−0.25
Two-party-preferred result
Labor	Stephen Bali	28,020	67.73	+4.55
Liberal	Allan Green	13,348	32.27	−4.55
Labor hold		Swing	+4.55	

=== Blue Mountains ===
2019 New South Wales state election: Blue Mountains
Party	Candidate	Votes	%	±%
Labor	Trish Doyle	23,022	46.77	+5.58
Liberal	Owen Laffin	13,982	28.40	−7.11
Greens	Kingsley Liu	5,993	12.17	−4.07
Animal Justice	Gregory Keightley	2,008	4.08	+4.08
Christian Democrats	Cameron Phillips	1,786	3.63	+0.52
Sustainable Australia	Richard Marschall	1,496	3.04	+3.04
Keep Sydney Open	Mark Pigott	941	1.91	+1.91
Total formal votes		49,228	97.52	+0.04
Informal votes		1,250	2.48	−0.04
Turnout		50,478	91.97	−1.33
Two-party-preferred result
Labor	Trish Doyle	28,834	64.86	+6.71
Liberal	Owen Laffin	15,620	35.14	−6.71
Labor hold		Swing	+6.71	

=== Cabramatta ===
2019 New South Wales state election: Cabramatta
Party	Candidate	Votes	%	±%
Labor	Nick Lalich	23,616	49.88	−10.01
Independent	Dai Le	12,250	25.88	+25.87
Liberal	Austin Le	7,018	14.82	−13.42
Greens	Christopher James	2,384	5.04	−0.13
Independent	Phuoc Vo	2,075	4.38	+4.38
Total formal votes		47,343	95.75	+0.24
Informal votes		2,102	4.25	−0.24
Turnout		49,445	89.91	−0.76
Two-party-preferred result
Labor	Nick Lalich	27,375	75.53	+8.33
Liberal	Austin Le	8,871	24.47	−8.33
Two-candidate-preferred result
Labor	Nick Lalich	25,089	62.87	−4.33
Independent	Dai Le	14,818	37.13	+4.33
Labor hold		Swing	−4.33	

=== Camden ===
2019 New South Wales state election: Camden
Party	Candidate	Votes	%	±%
Liberal	Peter Sidgreaves	26,999	43.01	−18.34
Labor	Sally Quinnell	18,886	30.09	+2.87
One Nation	Ben Casey	8,330	13.27	+13.27
Independent	Andrew Simpson	4,048	6.45	+6.45
Greens	Karen Stewart	2,359	3.76	−1.54
Keep Sydney Open	Daniel Aragona	1,432	2.28	+2.28
Sustainable Australia	Danica Sajn	718	1.14	+1.14
Total formal votes		62,772	96.14	−0.26
Informal votes		2,520	3.86	+0.26
Turnout		65,292	92.75	−0.35
Two-party-preferred result
Liberal	Peter Sidgreaves	29,556	57.56	−10.72
Labor	Sally Quinnell	21,796	42.44	+10.72
Liberal hold		Swing	−10.72	

=== Campbelltown ===
2019 New South Wales state election: Campbelltown
Party	Candidate	Votes	%	±%
Labor	Greg Warren	24,476	53.76	+3.46
Liberal	Riley Munro	12,069	26.51	−11.35
Greens	Jayden Rivera	2,339	5.14	−0.43
Christian Democrats	James Gent	2,001	4.40	+0.75
Animal Justice	Matthew Stellino	1,822	4.00	+4.00
Keep Sydney Open	Martin O'Sullivan	1,723	3.78	+3.78
Sustainable Australia	Michael Clark	1,096	2.41	+2.41
Total formal votes		45,526	94.97	−0.78
Informal votes		2,411	5.03	+0.78
Turnout		47,937	87.83	−1.96
Two-party-preferred result
Labor	Greg Warren	27,026	67.01	+9.68
Liberal	Riley Munro	13,305	32.99	−9.68
Labor hold		Swing	+9.68	

=== Canterbury ===
2019 New South Wales state election: Canterbury
Party	Candidate	Votes	%	±%
Labor	Sophie Cotsis	24,674	50.61	+0.37
Liberal	Matt Harrison	15,376	31.54	+4.54
Greens	Linda Eisler	6,146	12.61	+2.93
Christian Democrats	Fatima Figueira	2,560	5.25	−4.94
Total formal votes		48,756	95.59	+0.38
Informal votes		2,247	4.41	−0.38
Turnout		51,003	89.22	−0.46
Two-party-preferred result
Labor	Sophie Cotsis	28,358	63.03	−2.66
Liberal	Matt Harrison	16,634	36.97	+2.66
Labor hold		Swing	−2.66	

=== Castle Hill ===
2019 New South Wales state election: Castle Hill
Party	Candidate	Votes	%	±%
Liberal	Ray Williams	36,047	68.57	−2.41
Labor	David Ager	10,455	19.89	+3.91
Greens	David Field	4,116	7.83	+0.86
Sustainable Australia	Herman Kuipers	1,953	3.72	+3.71
Total formal votes		52,571	97.49	+0.14
Informal votes		1,354	2.51	−0.14
Turnout		53,925	92.59	−0.53
Two-party-preferred result
Liberal	Ray Williams	37,043	74.68	−4.72
Labor	David Ager	12,561	25.32	+4.72
Liberal hold		Swing	−4.72	

=== Cessnock ===
2019 New South Wales state election: Cessnock
Party	Candidate	Votes	%	±%
Labor	Clayton Barr	27,122	54.48	−7.74
National	Josh Angus	12,081	24.27	+1.03
Greens	Janet Murray	4,010	8.06	−0.36
Animal Justice	Chris Parker	3,949	7.93	+7.93
Sustainable Australia	Steve Russell	2,619	5.26	+5.26
Total formal votes		49,781	94.96	−0.64
Informal votes		2,643	5.04	+0.64
Turnout		52,424	89.97	−1.39
Two-party-preferred result
Labor	Clayton Barr	30,229	69.34	−2.67
National	Josh Angus	13,364	30.66	+2.67
Labor hold		Swing	−2.67	

=== Charlestown ===
2019 New South Wales state election: Charlestown
Party	Candidate	Votes	%	±%
Labor	Jodie Harrison	24,590	50.31	+2.11
Liberal	Jennifer Barrie	16,220	33.19	+2.89
Greens	Therese Doyle	5,539	11.33	+0.34
Animal Justice	Richard Turner	2,525	5.17	+5.17
Total formal votes		48,874	96.47	+0.40
Informal votes		1,787	3.53	−0.40
Turnout		50,661	90.92	−2.03
Two-party-preferred result
Labor	Jodie Harrison	28,270	62.35	−0.55
Liberal	Jennifer Barrie	17,069	37.65	+0.55
Labor hold		Swing	−0.55	

=== Clarence ===
2019 New South Wales state election: Clarence
Party	Candidate	Votes	%	±%
National	Chris Gulaptis	22,965	46.53	−3.91
Labor	Trent Gilbert	10,342	20.95	−7.51
Shooters, Fishers, Farmers	Steve Cansdell	8,308	16.83	+16.83
Greens	Gregory Clancy	3,914	7.93	−1.20
Independent	Debrah Novak	3,038	6.16	+1.49
Sustainable Australia	Thom Kotis	788	1.60	+1.60
Total formal votes		49,355	96.75	−0.13
Informal votes		1,657	3.25	+0.13
Turnout		51,012	89.72	+0.03
Two-party-preferred result
National	Chris Gulaptis	25,985	64.47	+4.79
Labor	Trent Gilbert	14,322	35.53	−4.79
National hold		Swing	+4.79	

=== Coffs Harbour ===
2019 New South Wales state election: Coffs Harbour
Party	Candidate	Votes	%	±%
National	Gurmesh Singh	20,268	42.82	−11.76
Labor	Tony Judge	8,371	17.69	−8.21
Independent	Sally Townley	8,247	17.42	+17.42
Shooters, Fishers, Farmers	Stuart Davidson	3,405	7.19	+7.19
Greens	Jonathan Cassell	3,090	6.53	−7.03
Liberal Democrats	Gregory Renet	1,542	3.26	+3.26
Animal Justice	Robyn Marchant	1,278	2.70	+2.70
Independent	Ann Leonard	1,132	2.39	+2.39
Total formal votes		47,333	96.25	−0.53
Informal votes		1,846	3.75	+0.53
Turnout		49,179	88.87	−0.01
Two-party-preferred result
National	Gurmesh Singh	22,799	60.77	−3.53
Labor	Tony Judge	14,717	39.23	+3.53
Two-candidate-preferred result
National	Gurmesh Singh	22,375	60.30	−4.00
Independent	Sally Townley	14,730	39.70	+39.70
National hold				

=== Coogee ===
2019 New South Wales state election: Coogee
Party	Candidate	Votes	%	±%
Liberal	Bruce Notley-Smith	18,937	41.14	−5.42
Labor	Marjorie O'Neill	15,819	34.36	+1.82
Greens	Lindsay Shurey	6,687	14.53	−4.06
Keep Sydney Open	Joseph O'Donoghue	2,232	4.85	+4.85
Animal Justice	Simon Garrod	804	1.75	+1.75
Sustainable Australia	Lluisa Murray	650	1.41	+1.41
Small Business	Ciaran O'Brien	473	1.03	+1.03
Shooters, Fishers, Farmers	Joshua Turnbull	433	0.94	+0.94
Total formal votes		46,035	98.13	+0.48
Informal votes		879	1.87	−0.48
Turnout		46,914	85.24	−2.09
Two-party-preferred result
Labor	Marjorie O'Neill	21,510	51.64	+4.56
Liberal	Bruce Notley-Smith	20,141	48.36	−4.56
Labor gain from Liberal		Swing	+4.56	

=== Cootamundra ===
2019 New South Wales state election: Cootamundra
Party	Candidate	Votes	%	±%
National	Steph Cooke	30,206	63.66	−2.24
Shooters, Fishers, Farmers	Matthew Stadtmiller	7,447	15.70	+15.70
Labor	Mark Douglass	7,302	15.39	−10.59
Greens	Jeffrey Passlow	1,380	2.91	−0.57
Sustainable Australia	Joseph Costello	660	1.39	+1.39
Australia First	Jim Saleam	453	0.95	+0.95
Total formal votes		47,448	97.30	−0.01
Informal votes		1,319	2.70	+0.01
Turnout		48,767	91.20	−0.63
Two-party-preferred result
National	Steph Cooke	32,504	77.07	+6.65
Labor	Mark Douglass	9,673	22.93	−6.65
National hold		Swing	+6.65	

=== Cronulla ===
2019 New South Wales state election: Cronulla
Party	Candidate	Votes	%	±%
Liberal	Mark Speakman	32,484	63.52	+1.57
Labor	Teressa Farhart	11,866	23.20	+1.30
Greens	Jon Doig	3,789	7.41	−1.69
Keep Sydney Open	Phillip Burriel	1,738	3.40	+3.40
Sustainable Australia	Richard Moran	1,264	2.47	+2.47
Total formal votes		51,141	97.48	+0.47
Informal votes		1,321	2.52	−0.47
Turnout		52,462	91.60	−1.38
Two-party-preferred result
Liberal	Mark Speakman	33,349	69.61	−1.32
Labor	Teressa Farhart	14,556	30.39	+1.32
Liberal hold		Swing	−1.32	

=== Davidson ===
2019 New South Wales state election: Davidson
Party	Candidate	Votes	%	±%
Liberal	Jonathan O'Dea	32,023	65.13	−4.52
Greens	Felicity Davis	6,652	13.53	+0.07
Labor	Joseph Von Bornemann	6,645	13.51	+0.86
Keep Sydney Open	Jacob Shteyman	1,984	4.04	+4.04
Sustainable Australia	Stephen Molloy	1,865	3.79	+3.79
Total formal votes		49,169	97.97	+0.19
Informal votes		1,021	2.03	−0.19
Turnout		50,190	91.35	−1.12
Two-party-preferred result
Liberal	Jonathan O'Dea	33,750	75.47	−3.52
Labor	Joseph Von Bornemann	10,967	24.53	+3.52
Two-candidate-preferred result
Liberal	Jonathan O'Dea	33,440	75.24	−3.58
Greens	Felicity Davis	11,004	24.76	+3.58
Liberal hold		Swing	−3.58	

=== Drummoyne ===
2019 New South Wales state election: Drummoyne
Party	Candidate	Votes	%	±%
Liberal	John Sidoti	27,922	58.83	−2.28
Labor	Tom Hore	12,012	25.31	+1.60
Greens	Charles Jago	4,461	9.40	−1.58
Keep Sydney Open	David Roberts	1,781	3.75	+3.75
Animal Justice	Maurice Saidi	1,288	2.71	+2.71
Total formal votes		47,464	97.73	+0.23
Informal votes		1,102	2.27	−0.23
Turnout		48,566	89.99	−1.59
Two-party-preferred result
Liberal	John Sidoti	28,878	65.00	−3.78
Labor	Tom Hore	15,552	35.00	+3.78
Liberal hold		Swing	−3.78	

=== Dubbo ===
2019 New South Wales state election: Dubbo
Party	Candidate	Votes	%	±%
National	Dugald Saunders	18,131	37.42	−23.04
Independent	Mathew Dickerson	13,771	28.42	+28.42
Labor	Stephen Lawrence	7,151	14.76	−8.72
Shooters, Fishers, Farmers	Lara Quealy	6,636	13.70	+13.70
Greens	Rod Pryor	1,771	3.65	−0.77
Conservatives	April Salter	681	1.41	+1.41
Flux	Joanne Cotterill	314	0.65	+0.65
Total formal votes		48,455	96.23	−0.50
Informal votes		1,900	3.77	+0.50
Turnout		50,355	89.98	−0.91
Two-party-preferred result
National	Dugald Saunders	23,070	68.16	−2.27
Labor	Stephen Lawrence	10,778	31.84	+2.27
Two-candidate-preferred result
National	Dugald Saunders	19,920	52.02	−18.40
Independent	Mathew Dickerson	18,370	47.98	+47.98
National hold				

=== East Hills ===
2019 New South Wales state election: East Hills
Party	Candidate	Votes	%	±%
Liberal	Wendy Lindsay	19,963	41.92	−2.27
Labor	Cameron Murphy	19,152	40.22	−1.83
Greens	Suzan Virago	2,298	4.83	−1.79
Christian Democrats	Owen Butt	2,159	4.53	−0.33
Keep Sydney Open	Lisa Maddock	1,773	3.72	+3.72
Independent	Chris Brogan	1,346	2.83	+2.83
Animal Justice	Heather Barnes	932	1.96	+1.96
Total formal votes		47,623	95.41	−0.31
Informal votes		2,292	4.59	+0.31
Turnout		49,915	90.52	−1.58
Two-party-preferred result
Liberal	Wendy Lindsay	21,646	50.50	+0.08
Labor	Cameron Murphy	21,217	49.50	−0.08
Liberal hold		Swing	+0.08	

=== Epping ===
2019 New South Wales state election: Epping
Party	Candidate	Votes	%	±%
Liberal	Dominic Perrottet	27,506	55.88	+1.54
Labor	Alan Mascarenhas	13,652	27.73	+8.04
Greens	Simon Margan	5,143	10.45	−3.69
Independent	Victor Waterson	1,544	3.14	+3.14
Keep Sydney Open	Samuel Lyndon	1,379	2.80	+2.80
Total formal votes		49,224	97.73	+0.19
Informal votes		1,145	2.27	−0.19
Turnout		50,369	92.44	−0.65
Two-party-preferred result
Liberal	Dominic Perrottet	28,584	62.38	−3.85
Labor	Alan Mascarenhas	17,238	37.62	+3.85
Liberal hold		Swing	−3.85	

=== Fairfield ===
2019 New South Wales state election: Fairfield
Party	Candidate	Votes	%	±%
Labor	Guy Zangari	25,225	57.23	+3.53
Liberal	Sabah (Sam) Youkhana	11,231	25.48	+1.36
Christian Democrats	Sam Georgis	4,257	9.66	−0.14
Greens	Astrid O'Neill	3,362	7.63	+2.39
Total formal votes		44,075	94.19	−0.38
Informal votes		2,719	5.81	+0.38
Turnout		46,794	87.18	−1.93
Two-party-preferred result
Labor	Guy Zangari	26,848	67.93	+0.14
Liberal	Sabah (Sam) Youkhana	12,675	32.07	−0.14
Labor hold		Swing	+0.14	

=== Gosford ===
2019 New South Wales state election: Gosford
Party	Candidate	Votes	%	±%
Labor	Liesl Tesch	21,505	44.22	+5.56
Liberal	Susan Dengate	17,529	36.04	−6.51
Greens	Hillary Morris	4,405	9.06	+0.05
Shooters, Fishers, Farmers	Larry Freeman	2,307	4.74	+4.74
Animal Justice	Patrick Murphy	1,678	3.45	+3.45
Sustainable Australia	Judy Singer	1,213	2.49	+2.49
Total formal votes		48,637	96.45	−0.39
Informal votes		1,788	3.55	+0.39
Turnout		50,425	89.35	−1.26
Two-party-preferred result
Labor	Liesl Tesch	25,048	57.27	+7.04
Liberal	Susan Dengate	18,691	42.73	−7.04
Labor hold		Swing	+7.04	

=== Goulburn ===
2019 New South Wales state election: Goulburn
Party	Candidate	Votes	%	±%
Liberal	Wendy Tuckerman	19,957	39.09	−9.66
Labor	Ursula Stephens	15,355	30.07	−4.20
Shooters, Fishers, Farmers	Andy Wood	4,847	9.49	+9.49
One Nation	Richard Orchard	4,723	9.25	+9.25
Greens	Saan Ecker	4,100	8.03	+0.17
Animal Justice	Tracey Keenan	1,247	2.44	+2.44
Liberal Democrats	Dean McCrae	828	1.62	+1.62
Total formal votes		51,057	96.93	−0.32
Informal votes		1,616	3.07	+0.32
Turnout		52,673	91.50	−1.24
Two-party-preferred result
Liberal	Wendy Tuckerman	22,539	53.74	−2.89
Labor	Ursula Stephens	19,398	46.26	+2.89
Liberal hold		Swing	−2.89	

=== Granville ===
2019 New South Wales state election: Granville
Party	Candidate	Votes	%	±%
Labor	Julia Finn	22,012	49.81	+8.78
Liberal	Tony Issa	16,522	37.39	−0.27
Greens	Benjamin Prociv	1,638	3.71	−1.69
Christian Democrats	Keith Piper	1,631	3.69	−8.71
Independent	Abdul Charaf	740	1.67	+1.67
Independent	Steven Lopez	682	1.54	−0.35
Animal Justice	Rohan Laxmanalal	652	1.48	+1.48
	Linda Harris	314	0.71	+0.71
Total formal votes		44,191	95.35	+0.04
Informal votes		2,154	4.65	−0.04
Turnout		46,345	86.55	−2.62
Two-party-preferred result
Labor	Julia Finn	23,629	57.64	+5.53
Liberal	Tony Issa	17,365	42.36	−5.53
Labor hold		Swing	+5.53	

=== Hawkesbury ===
2019 New South Wales state election: Hawkesbury
Party	Candidate	Votes	%	±%
Liberal	Robyn Preston	25,127	51.34	−5.27
Labor	Peter Reynolds	9,325	19.05	−3.39
Shooters, Fishers, Farmers	Shane Djuric	4,385	8.96	+8.96
Greens	Danielle Wheeler	3,102	6.34	−1.20
Independent	Marie-Jeanne Bowyer	2,290	4.68	+4.68
Animal Justice	Sarah Coogans	1,394	2.85	+2.85
Independent	Eddie Dogramaci	1,312	2.68	+2.68
Sustainable Australia	Elissa Carrey	1,217	2.49	+2.49
Keep Sydney Open	Perran Costi	789	1.61	+1.61
Total formal votes		48,941	96.13	+0.34
Informal votes		1,972	3.87	−0.34
Turnout		50,913	91.32	−0.89
Two-party-preferred result
Liberal	Robyn Preston	26,935	67.48	−0.30
Labor	Peter Reynolds	12,982	32.52	+0.30
Liberal hold		Swing	−0.30	

=== Heathcote ===
2019 New South Wales state election: Heathcote
Party	Candidate	Votes	%	±%
Liberal	Lee Evans	25,057	48.81	−1.16
Labor	Maryanne Stuart	17,842	34.76	+2.05
Greens	Mitchell Shakespeare	4,604	8.97	−0.28
Shooters, Fishers, Farmers	Joel McManus	1,959	3.82	+3.82
Animal Justice	James Aspey	1,872	3.65	+3.65
Total formal votes		51,334	97.30	+0.43
Informal votes		1,424	2.70	−0.43
Turnout		52,758	93.95	−0.30
Two-party-preferred result
Liberal	Lee Evans	26,174	54.96	−2.63
Labor	Maryanne Stuart	21,450	45.04	+2.63
Liberal hold		Swing	−2.63	

=== Heffron ===
2019 New South Wales state election: Heffron
Party	Candidate	Votes	%	±%
Labor	Ron Hoenig	20,409	40.81	−3.49
Liberal	Alexander Andruska	13,863	27.72	−1.99
Greens	Kym Chapple	9,565	19.13	−1.98
Keep Sydney Open	Chris Ryan	4,575	9.15	+9.15
Animal Justice	Michael Dello-Iacovo	1,598	3.20	+3.20
Total formal votes		50,010	97.48	+0.73
Informal votes		1,292	2.52	−0.73
Turnout		51,302	84.69	−2.49
Two-party-preferred result
Labor	Ron Hoenig	28,874	65.13	+1.03
Liberal	Alexander Andruska	15,462	34.87	−1.03
Labor hold		Swing	+1.03	

=== Holsworthy ===
2019 New South Wales state election: Holsworthy
Party	Candidate	Votes	%	±%
Liberal	Melanie Gibbons	21,481	44.53	−4.99
Labor	Charishma Kaliyanda	18,152	37.63	+1.18
One Nation	Michael Byrne	3,905	8.09	+8.09
Greens	Chris Kerle	2,191	4.54	+0.04
Animal Justice	Gae Constable	1,901	3.94	+3.94
Liberal Democrats	Roland Barber	614	1.27	+1.27
Total formal votes		48,244	95.53	+0.45
Informal votes		2,256	4.47	−0.45
Turnout		50,500	89.59	−1.70
Two-party-preferred result
Liberal	Melanie Gibbons	22,861	53.29	−3.41
Labor	Charishma Kaliyanda	20,042	46.71	+3.41
Liberal hold		Swing	−3.41	

=== Hornsby ===
2019 New South Wales state election: Hornsby
Party	Candidate	Votes	%	±%
Liberal	Matt Kean	26,269	52.53	−5.84
Labor	Katie Gompertz	9,683	19.36	+0.01
Greens	Joe Nicita	6,131	12.26	−1.63
Independent	Mick Gallagher	2,287	4.57	−0.20
One Nation	Emma Eros	2,250	4.50	+4.50
Keep Sydney Open	Hayden Gray	1,192	2.38	+2.38
Conservatives	Andrew Isaac	893	1.79	+1.79
Sustainable Australia	Justin Thomas	835	1.67	+1.67
Independent	John Murray	463	0.93	+0.93
Total formal votes		50,003	97.53	−0.19
Informal votes		1,268	2.47	+0.19
Turnout		51,271	92.92	−0.46
Two-party-preferred result
Liberal	Matt Kean	28,700	66.30	−2.64
Labor	Katie Gompertz	14,585	33.70	+2.64
Liberal hold		Swing	−2.64	

=== Keira ===
2019 New South Wales state election: Keira
Party	Candidate	Votes	%	±%
Labor	Ryan Park	27,884	53.69	+0.55
Liberal	Chris Atlee	13,736	26.45	−1.19
Greens	Kaye Osborn	8,248	15.88	+1.83
Sustainable Australia	John Gill	2,068	3.98	+3.98
Total formal votes		51,936	97.07	−0.05
Informal votes		1,567	2.93	+0.05
Turnout		53,503	90.95	−0.62
Two-party-preferred result
Labor	Ryan Park	33,744	69.75	+2.35
Liberal	Chris Atlee	14,635	30.25	−2.35
Labor hold		Swing	+2.35	

=== Kiama ===
2019 New South Wales state election: Kiama
Party	Candidate	Votes	%	±%
Liberal	Gareth Ward	26,230	53.59	+1.98
Labor	Anthony Higgins	13,803	28.20	−3.85
Greens	Nina Digiglio	5,815	11.88	+0.83
Christian Democrats	John Kadwell	1,671	3.41	+0.26
Sustainable Australia	Anne Whatman	1,427	2.92	+2.92
Total formal votes		48,946	96.83	−0.36
Informal votes		1,603	3.17	+0.36
Turnout		50,549	91.10	−1.26
Two-party-preferred result
Liberal	Gareth Ward	28,016	62.01	+3.35
Labor	Anthony Higgins	17,167	37.99	−3.35
Liberal hold		Swing	+3.35	

=== Kogarah ===
2019 New South Wales state election: Kogarah
Party	Candidate	Votes	%	±%
Labor	Chris Minns	19,254	42.25	−3.17
Liberal	Scott Yung	19,185	42.09	+7.92
Greens	Greta Werner	2,950	6.47	−0.02
One Nation	Phillip Pollard	2,790	6.12	+6.12
Keep Sydney Open	Natalie Resman	1,397	3.07	+3.07
Total formal votes		45,576	95.56	+0.13
Informal votes		2,120	4.44	−0.13
Turnout		47,696	89.61	−0.91
Two-party-preferred result
Labor	Chris Minns	21,544	51.77	−5.09
Liberal	Scott Yung	20,073	48.23	+5.09
Labor hold		Swing	−5.09	

=== Ku-ring-gai ===
2019 New South Wales state election: Ku-ring-gai
Party	Candidate	Votes	%	±%
Liberal	Alister Henskens	29,369	60.27	−2.27
Labor	Amanda Keeling	8,891	18.25	+1.88
Greens	Qiu Yue (Viki) Zhang	6,315	12.96	−2.83
Sustainable Australia	Mark Ferris	1,636	3.36	+3.36
Keep Sydney Open	Liam Blood	1,466	3.01	+3.01
Liberal Democrats	Mitchell Strahan	1,053	2.16	+2.16
Total formal votes		48,730	97.79	+0.18
Informal votes		1,101	2.21	−0.18
Turnout		49,831	91.53	−1.22
Two-party-preferred result
Liberal	Alister Henskens	31,027	70.52	−2.46
Labor	Amanda Keeling	12,969	29.48	+2.46
Liberal hold		Swing	−2.46	

=== Lake Macquarie ===
2019 New South Wales state election: Lake Macquarie
Party	Candidate	Votes	%	±%
Independent	Greg Piper	26,811	53.53	+11.08
Labor	Jo Smith	10,735	21.43	−9.23
Liberal	Lindsay Paterson	7,742	15.46	−1.33
Greens	Kim Grierson	2,517	5.03	+0.07
Animal Justice	Laurance Taranto	1,481	2.96	+0.56
Sustainable Australia	Marie Rolfe	796	1.59	+1.59
Total formal votes		50,082	96.48	−0.28
Informal votes		1,827	3.52	+0.28
Turnout		51,909	89.99	−1.00
Two-party-preferred result
Labor	Jo Smith	16,390	57.37	−5.79
Liberal	Lindsay Paterson	12,180	42.63	+5.79
Two-candidate-preferred result
Independent	Greg Piper	31,164	72.11	+11.42
Labor	Jo Smith	12,053	27.89	−11.42
Independent hold		Swing	+11.42	

=== Lakemba ===
2019 New South Wales state election: Lakemba
Party	Candidate	Votes	%	±%
Labor	Jihad Dib	27,528	61.70	+4.40
Liberal	Rashid Bhuiyan	10,031	22.48	+1.76
Christian Democrats	Karl Schubert	3,170	7.11	−5.70
Greens	Emmet de Bhaldraithe	2,041	4.57	−2.91
Keep Sydney Open	Omar Najjar	988	2.21	+2.21
Animal Justice	Dorlene Abou-Haidar	857	1.92	+1.92
Total formal votes		44,615	93.87	−0.60
Informal votes		2,916	6.13	+0.60
Turnout		47,531	86.02	−0.89
Two-party-preferred result
Labor	Jihad Dib	29,245	72.42	+0.86
Liberal	Rashid Bhuiyan	11,136	27.58	−0.86
Labor hold		Swing	+0.86	

=== Lane Cove ===
2019 New South Wales state election: Lane Cove
Party	Candidate	Votes	%	±%
Liberal	Anthony Roberts	26,388	51.80	−5.35
Labor	Andrew Zbik	10,281	20.18	+0.05
Independent	Richard Quinn	5,959	11.70	+11.70
Greens	Pierre Masse	5,441	10.68	−4.13
Keep Sydney Open	Joanne Spiteri	1,836	3.60	+3.60
Sustainable Australia	Murray Fleming	1,036	2.03	+2.03
Total formal votes		50,941	97.92	+0.56
Informal votes		1,081	2.08	−0.56
Turnout		52,022	90.97	−0.69
Two-party-preferred result
Liberal	Anthony Roberts	29,042	64.35	−3.47
Labor	Andrew Zbik	16,092	35.65	+3.47
Liberal hold		Swing	−3.47	

=== Lismore ===
2019 New South Wales state election: Lismore
Party	Candidate	Votes	%	±%
National	Austin Curtin	19,104	39.68	−2.78
Labor	Janelle Saffin	12,328	25.61	−0.02
Greens	Sue Higginson	11,693	24.29	−2.14
Independent	Greg Bennett	2,530	5.26	+5.25
Animal Justice	Alison Waters	1,184	2.46	+0.94
Sustainable Australia	David Taylor	742	1.54	+1.54
Conservatives	Paul Collits	564	1.17	+1.17
Total formal votes		48,145	96.96	−0.82
Informal votes		1,508	3.04	+0.82
Turnout		49,653	88.50	−1.29
Two-party-preferred result
Labor	Janelle Saffin	21,856	51.35	+1.57
National	Austin Curtin	20,710	48.65	−1.57
Labor gain from National		Swing	+1.57	

=== Liverpool ===
2019 New South Wales state election: Liverpool
Party	Candidate	Votes	%	±%
Labor	Paul Lynch	26,141	55.58	−4.58
Liberal	Paul Zadro	12,692	26.98	+3.31
Independent	Michael Andjelkovic	3,274	6.96	+6.96
Greens	Signe Westerberg	2,421	5.15	+0.85
Keep Sydney Open	Ravneel Chand	1,256	2.67	+2.67
Conservatives	Adam Novek	1,251	2.66	+2.66
Total formal votes		47,035	94.57	−0.07
Informal votes		2,700	5.43	+0.07
Turnout		49,735	86.39	−1.57
Two-party-preferred result
Labor	Paul Lynch	27,951	66.72	−4.17
Liberal	Paul Zadro	13,945	33.28	+4.17
Labor hold		Swing	−4.17	

=== Londonderry ===
2019 New South Wales state election: Londonderry
Party	Candidate	Votes	%	±%
Labor	Prue Car	25,809	48.99	−1.85
Liberal	Belinda Hill	20,066	38.09	+2.12
Greens	Charlie Pierce	2,650	5.03	+0.18
Sustainable Australia	David Bowen	2,206	4.19	+4.19
Christian Democrats	Don Modarelli	1,955	3.71	−1.36
Total formal votes		52,686	95.04	+0.41
Informal votes		2,749	4.96	−0.41
Turnout		55,435	86.83	−2.15
Two-party-preferred result
Labor	Prue Car	27,442	56.46	−2.37
Liberal	Belinda Hill	21,163	43.54	+2.37
Labor hold		Swing	−2.37	

=== Macquarie Fields ===
2019 New South Wales state election: Macquarie Fields
Party	Candidate	Votes	%	±%
Labor	Anoulack Chanthivong	27,942	52.93	+2.12
Liberal	Zahurul Quazi	15,057	28.52	−8.03
Independent	Mick Allen	3,361	6.37	+3.10
Keep Sydney Open	Scott Singh	2,403	4.55	+4.55
Greens	Stephen Eagar-Deitz	2,247	4.26	+0.47
Independent	Syed Ahmed	1,779	3.37	+3.37
Total formal votes		52,789	95.38	−0.37
Informal votes		2,558	4.62	+0.37
Turnout		55,347	89.58	−0.06
Two-party-preferred result
Labor	Anoulack Chanthivong	29,944	64.75	+6.66
Liberal	Zahurul Quazi	16,301	35.25	−6.66
Labor hold		Swing	+6.66	

=== Maitland ===
2019 New South Wales state election: Maitland
Party	Candidate	Votes	%	±%
Labor	Jenny Aitchison	23,465	44.23	+1.79
Liberal	Sally Halliday	14,137	26.65	+1.82
One Nation	Neil Turner	5,785	10.90	+10.90
Greens	John Brown	3,428	6.46	+0.11
Shooters, Fishers, Farmers	Nadrra Sarkis	2,842	5.36	+5.36
Animal Justice	Amy Johnson	1,454	2.74	+2.74
Keep Sydney Open	James Lawson	1,108	2.09	+2.09
Sustainable Australia	Sam Ferguson	831	1.57	+1.57
Total formal votes		53,050	96.11	−0.47
Informal votes		2,146	3.89	+0.47
Turnout		55,196	91.55	−1.03
Two-party-preferred result
Labor	Jenny Aitchison	27,211	63.21	−0.62
Liberal	Sally Halliday	15,835	36.79	+0.62
Labor hold		Swing	−0.62	

=== Manly ===
2019 New South Wales state election: Manly
Party	Candidate	Votes	%	±%
Liberal	James Griffin	25,418	52.61	−15.39
Greens	Kristyn Glanville	9,137	18.91	+1.78
Labor	Natasha Phillips-Mason	8,619	17.84	+4.95
Keep Sydney Open	Dane Murray	2,456	5.08	+5.08
Sustainable Australia	Emanuele Paletto	1,502	3.11	+3.11
Animal Justice	Kate Paterson	1,184	2.45	+2.45
Total formal votes		48,316	97.85	−0.02
Informal votes		1,061	2.15	+0.02
Turnout		49,377	88.69	−1.03
Two-party-preferred result
Liberal	James Griffin	27,239	64.70	−13.70
Labor	Natasha Phillips-Mason	14,859	35.30	+13.70
Two-candidate-preferred result
Liberal	James Griffin	26,628	62.90	−11.62
Greens	Kristyn Glanville	15,706	37.10	+11.62
Liberal hold		Swing	−11.62	

=== Maroubra ===
2019 New South Wales state election: Maroubra
Party	Candidate	Votes	%	±%
Labor	Michael Daley	20,243	41.93	−10.46
Liberal	Pat Farmer	15,329	31.75	−3.61
Independent	Noel D'Souza	6,492	13.45	+13.45
Greens	James Cruz	3,517	7.28	−1.55
Keep Sydney Open	Rowan Kos	1,242	2.57	+2.57
Sustainable Australia	Petra Campbell	923	1.91	+1.91
Conservatives	Caroline Simons	532	1.10	+1.10
Total formal votes		48,278	97.25	+0.13
Informal votes		1,364	2.75	−0.13
Turnout		49,642	88.38	−1.58
Two-party-preferred result
Labor	Michael Daley	24,026	58.46	−2.38
Liberal	Pat Farmer	17,069	41.54	+2.38
Labor hold		Swing	−2.38	

=== Miranda ===
2019 New South Wales state election: Miranda
Party	Candidate	Votes	%	±%
Liberal	Eleni Petinos	26,417	53.84	−1.41
Labor	Jen Armstrong	13,213	26.93	−2.70
One Nation	Gaye Cameron	3,461	7.05	+7.05
Greens	Nathan Hunt	3,333	6.79	−0.18
Christian Democrats	George Capsis	1,604	3.27	−1.06
Sustainable Australia	Nick Hughes	1,038	2.12	+2.12
Total formal votes		49,066	97.35	+0.68
Informal votes		1,336	2.65	−0.68
Turnout		50,402	91.73	−1.54
Two-party-preferred result
Liberal	Eleni Petinos	28,414	64.57	+1.61
Labor	Jen Armstrong	15,593	35.43	−1.61
Liberal hold		Swing	+1.61	

=== Monaro ===
2019 New South Wales state election: Monaro
Party	Candidate	Votes	%	±%
National	John Barilaro	25,868	52.31	+3.58
Labor	Bryce Wilson	13,431	27.16	−13.44
Greens	Peter Marshall	3,913	7.91	+0.08
Shooters, Fishers, Farmers	Mick Holton	3,848	7.78	+7.78
Independent	Andrew Thaler	1,229	2.49	+2.49
Animal Justice	Frankie Seymour	1,159	2.34	+2.34
Total formal votes		49,448	97.42	+0.03
Informal votes		1,310	2.58	−0.03
Turnout		50,758	89.13	−0.30
Two-party-preferred result
National	John Barilaro	27,723	61.61	+9.08
Labor	Bryce Wilson	17,276	38.39	−9.08
National hold		Swing	+9.08	

=== Mount Druitt ===
2019 New South Wales state election: Mount Druitt
Party	Candidate	Votes	%	±%
Labor	Edmond Atalla	26,869	57.13	+0.49
Liberal	Mark Rusev	13,209	28.09	−1.12
Greens	Brent Robertson	3,231	6.87	+1.75
Christian Democrats	Samraat Grewal	2,204	4.69	−0.76
Conservatives	George Lang	1,518	3.23	+3.23
Total formal votes		47,031	95.12	+0.41
Informal votes		2,413	4.88	−0.41
Turnout		49,444	87.73	−0.75
Two-party-preferred result
Labor	Edmond Atalla	28,505	66.42	+0.97
Liberal	Mark Rusev	14,410	33.58	−0.97
Labor hold		Swing	+0.97	

=== Mulgoa ===
2019 New South Wales state election: Mulgoa
Party	Candidate	Votes	%	±%
Liberal	Tanya Davies	29,379	57.19	+3.91
Labor	Todd Carney	17,270	33.62	−1.42
Greens	Rob Shield	2,897	5.64	+1.44
Sustainable Australia	Jessie Bijok	1,829	3.56	+3.56
Total formal votes		51,375	95.87	+0.10
Informal votes		2,213	4.13	−0.10
Turnout		53,588	91.98	−1.08
Two-party-preferred result
Liberal	Tanya Davies	29,910	61.33	+1.67
Labor	Todd Carney	18,858	38.67	−1.67
Liberal hold		Swing	+1.67	

=== Murray ===
2019 New South Wales state election: Murray
Party	Candidate	Votes	%	±%
Shooters, Fishers, Farmers	Helen Dalton	18,305	38.75	+38.75
National	Austin Evans	16,636	35.22	−20.28
Labor	Alan Purtill	4,134	8.75	−7.43
One Nation	Tom Weyrich	3,949	8.36	+8.36
Greens	Nivanka De Silva	1,238	2.62	+0.39
Ind. Riverina State	David Landini	976	2.07	+2.07
Christian Democrats	Philip Langfield	715	1.51	+0.11
Independent	Brian Mills	633	1.34	−2.42
Sustainable Australia	Carl Kendall	455	0.96	+0.96
Keep Sydney Open	Liam Davies	192	0.41	+0.41
Total formal votes		47,233	96.15	−0.11
Informal votes		1,889	3.85	+0.11
Turnout		49,122	88.06	+0.56
Two-party-preferred result
National	Austin Evans	20,029	74.91	−0.29
Labor	Alan Purtill	6,707	25.09	+0.29
Two-candidate-preferred result
Shooters, Fishers, Farmers	Helen Dalton	20,765	53.54	+53.54
National	Austin Evans	18,020	46.46	−26.19
Shooters, Fishers, Farmers gain from National				

=== Myall Lakes ===
2019 New South Wales state election: Myall Lakes
Party	Candidate	Votes	%	±%
National	Stephen Bromhead	24,367	48.43	+1.56
Labor	David Keegan	14,691	29.20	+1.26
Independent	Paul Sandilands	4,169	8.29	+8.29
Shooters, Fishers, Farmers	Heather Elliott	3,518	6.99	+6.99
Greens	Ellie Spence	2,797	5.56	−1.04
Sustainable Australia	Quentin Bye	773	1.54	+1.54
Total formal votes		50,315	96.70	−0.33
Informal votes		1,715	3.30	+0.33
Turnout		52,030	90.19	−0.56
Two-party-preferred result
National	Stephen Bromhead	25,990	59.19	+0.45
Labor	David Keegan	17,916	40.81	−0.45
National hold		Swing	+0.45	

=== Newcastle ===
2019 New South Wales state election: Newcastle
Party	Candidate	Votes	%	±%
Labor	Tim Crakanthorp	23,231	46.17	+6.03
Liberal	Blake Keating	13,224	26.28	−9.20
Greens	Charlotte McCabe	8,281	16.46	−1.87
Animal Justice	Sean Bremner Young	1,478	2.94	+2.94
Sustainable Australia	Beverley Jelfs	1,219	2.42	+2.42
Small Business	Glen Fredericks	1,178	2.34	+2.34
Socialist Alliance	Steve O'Brien	854	1.70	+0.45
Keep Sydney Open	Claudia Looker	854	1.70	+1.70
Total formal votes		50,319	96.73	+0.40
Informal votes		1,703	3.27	−0.40
Turnout		52,022	87.99	−2.35
Two-party-preferred result
Labor	Tim Crakanthorp	29,843	67.70	+10.33
Liberal	Blake Keating	14,236	32.30	−10.33
Labor hold		Swing	+10.33	

=== Newtown ===
2019 New South Wales state election: Newtown
Party	Candidate	Votes	%	±%
Greens	Jenny Leong	21,326	46.05	+0.48
Labor	Norma Ingram	12,202	26.35	−4.44
Liberal	Rohan Indraghanti	6,730	14.53	−3.25
Keep Sydney Open	Laura White	3,295	7.11	+7.11
Animal Justice	Michelle Buckmaster	1,105	2.39	+0.21
Sustainable Australia	Hugh Watson	967	2.09	+2.09
Small Business	Aaron Le Saux	687	1.48	+1.48
Total formal votes		46,312	97.88	+0.41
Informal votes		1,004	2.12	−0.41
Turnout		47,316	83.88	−2.58
Two-party-preferred result
Labor	Norma Ingram	28,960	77.66	+3.24
Liberal	Rohan Indraghanti	8,329	22.34	−3.24
Two-candidate-preferred result
Greens	Jenny Leong	24,849	63.83	+4.56
Labor	Norma Ingram	14,078	36.17	−4.56
Greens hold		Swing	+4.56	

=== North Shore ===
2019 New South Wales state election: North Shore
Party	Candidate	Votes	%	±%
Liberal	Felicity Wilson	22,261	46.60	−11.46
Independent	Carolyn Corrigan	9,341	19.55	+19.55
Labor	Michael Lester	5,900	12.35	−1.44
Greens	Toby Pettigrew	5,393	11.29	−3.32
Keep Sydney Open	Colin Furphy	1,993	4.17	+4.17
Animal Justice	Olivia Bouchier	827	1.73	+1.73
Liberal Democrats	Sam Gunning	785	1.64	+1.64
Sustainable Australia	Victoria Boast	661	1.38	+1.38
Conservatives	Jeffrey Grimshaw	613	1.28	+1.28
Total formal votes		47,774	98.52	+0.48
Informal votes		719	1.48	−0.48
Turnout		48,493	87.64	−0.53
Two-party-preferred result
Liberal	Felicity Wilson	25,032	67.85	−4.07
Labor	Michael Lester	11,863	32.15	+4.07
Two-candidate-preferred result
Liberal	Felicity Wilson	23,917	61.13	−10.06
Independent	Carolyn Corrigan	15,209	38.87	+38.87
Liberal hold				

=== Northern Tablelands ===
2019 New South Wales state election: Northern Tablelands
Party	Candidate	Votes	%	±%
National	Adam Marshall	35,766	73.47	+6.78
Labor	Debra O'Brien	5,503	11.30	−4.36
Shooters, Fishers, Farmers	Rayne Single	4,616	9.48	+9.48
Greens	Dorothy Robinson	2,793	5.74	−1.40
Total formal votes		48,678	98.03	+0.22
Informal votes		979	1.97	−0.22
Turnout		49,657	89.68	−0.44
Two-party-preferred result
National	Adam Marshall	37,727	82.84	+5.77
Labor	Debra O'Brien	7,814	17.16	−5.77
National hold		Swing	+5.77	

=== Oatley ===
2019 New South Wales state election: Oatley
Party	Candidate	Votes	%	±%
Liberal	Mark Coure	26,311	54.68	+3.53
Labor	Lucy Mannering	15,767	32.77	−3.67
Greens	Gianluca Dragone	3,080	6.40	−1.03
One Nation	Mark Preston	2,165	4.50	+4.50
Shooters, Fishers, Farmers	Raphael Bongomin	797	1.66	+1.66
Total formal votes		48,120	97.01	+0.26
Informal votes		1,481	2.99	−0.26
Turnout		49,601	92.23	−0.65
Two-party-preferred result
Liberal	Mark Coure	27,321	60.55	+3.93
Labor	Lucy Mannering	17,802	39.45	−3.93
Liberal hold		Swing	+3.93	

=== Orange ===
2019 New South Wales state election: Orange
Party	Candidate	Votes	%	±%
Shooters, Fishers, Farmers	Philip Donato	24,718	49.15	+49.15
National	Kate Hazelton	12,987	25.82	−39.77
Labor	Luke Sanger	5,126	10.19	−13.17
Greens	Stephen Nugent	2,615	5.20	−1.55
Christian Democrats	Maurice Davey	1,627	3.23	+0.64
Liberal Democrats	Stephen Bisgrove	1,037	2.06	+2.06
Independent	Terri Baxter	896	1.78	+1.78
Conservatives	Garry McMahon	873	1.74	+1.74
Keep Sydney Open	David O'Brien	416	0.83	+0.83
Total formal votes		50,295	96.52	−0.61
Informal votes		1,811	3.48	+0.61
Turnout		52,106	91.51	−0.01
Two-party-preferred result
National	Kate Hazelton	17,460	65.05	−6.65
Labor	Luke Sanger	9,380	34.95	+6.65
Two-candidate-preferred result
Shooters, Fishers, Farmers	Philip Donato	27,746	65.18	+65.18
National	Kate Hazelton	14,821	34.82	−36.88
Shooters, Fishers, Farmers gain from National				

Andrew Gee (National) had won the seat at the 2015 state election, however he resigned in 2016 and Philip Donato (Shooters, Fishers and Farmers Party) won the seat at the resulting by-election. At the 2019 state election, Donato retained the seat he won at the by-election.

=== Oxley ===
2019 New South Wales state election: Oxley
Party	Candidate	Votes	%	±%
National	Melinda Pavey	25,115	51.74	−0.93
Labor	Susan Jenvey	9,904	20.40	−6.28
Greens	Arthur Bain	6,179	12.73	−2.39
Shooters, Fishers, Farmers	Dean Saul	5,644	11.63	+11.63
Sustainable Australia	Debbie Smythe	1,698	3.50	+3.50
Total formal votes		48,540	96.50	−0.20
Informal votes		1,761	3.50	+0.20
Turnout		50,301	88.05	−1.07
Two-party-preferred result
National	Melinda Pavey	27,111	64.89	+3.98
Labor	Susan Jenvey	14,672	35.11	−3.98
National hold		Swing	+3.98	

=== Parramatta ===
2019 New South Wales state election: Parramatta
Party	Candidate	Votes	%	±%
Liberal	Geoff Lee	26,322	54.02	+0.18
Labor	Liz Scully	14,736	30.24	+1.49
Greens	Phil Bradley	3,637	7.46	−0.92
Independent OLC	Michelle Garrard	1,955	4.01	+0.81
Keep Sydney Open	Samuel Bellwood	1,023	2.10	+2.10
Sustainable Australia	Jasmina Moltter	701	1.44	+1.44
Socialist Alliance	Susan Price	354	0.73	+0.73
Total formal votes		48,728	96.78	+0.46
Informal votes		1,621	3.22	−0.46
Turnout		50,349	88.30	−1.03
Two-party-preferred result
Liberal	Geoff Lee	27,330	60.65	−2.21
Labor	Liz Scully	17,733	39.35	+2.21
Liberal hold		Swing	−2.21	

=== Penrith ===
2019 New South Wales state election: Penrith
Party	Candidate	Votes	%	±%
Liberal	Stuart Ayres	19,561	40.04	−5.59
Labor	Karen McKeown	17,415	35.65	+2.79
One Nation	Carl Halley	3,510	7.18	+7.18
Greens	Nick Best	2,454	5.02	−0.51
Independent	Mark Tyndall	1,415	2.90	+2.90
Shooters, Fishers, Farmers	Rodney Franich	1,276	2.61	+2.61
Christian Democrats	David Burton	1,095	2.24	−1.66
Animal Justice	Kaj McBeth	885	1.81	+1.81
Independent	Marcus Cornish	665	1.36	+1.36
Sustainable Australia	Geoff Brown	577	1.18	+1.18
Total formal votes		48,853	96.41	+0.43
Informal votes		1,819	3.59	−0.43
Turnout		50,672	89.58	−1.91
Two-party-preferred result
Liberal	Stuart Ayres	21,204	51.34	−4.90
Labor	Karen McKeown	20,096	48.66	+4.90
Liberal hold		Swing	−4.90	

=== Pittwater ===
2019 New South Wales state election: Pittwater
Party	Candidate	Votes	%	±%
Liberal	Rob Stokes	28,170	57.35	−10.41
Greens	Miranda Korzy	7,518	15.31	−0.79
Labor	Jared Turkington	6,168	12.56	−0.20
Sustainable Australia	Suzanne Daly	1,832	3.73	+3.73
Keep Sydney Open	Michael Newman	1,644	3.35	+3.35
Animal Justice	Natalie Matkovic	1,417	2.88	+2.88
Conservatives	Stacey Mitchell	1,283	2.61	+2.61
Independent	Stewart Matthews	1,087	2.21	+2.21
Total formal votes		49,119	97.33	−0.24
Informal votes		1,346	2.67	+0.24
Turnout		50,465	89.89	−1.43
Two-party-preferred result
Liberal	Rob Stokes	30,070	72.36	−5.53
Labor	Jared Turkington	11,486	27.64	+5.53
Two-candidate-preferred result
Liberal	Rob Stokes	29,696	70.84	−4.81
Greens	Miranda Korzy	12,225	29.16	+4.81
Liberal hold		Swing	−4.81	

=== Port Macquarie ===
2019 New South Wales state election: Port Macquarie
Party	Candidate	Votes	%	±%
National	Leslie Williams	33,538	63.60	+1.51
Labor	Peter Alley	12,220	23.17	−0.93
Greens	Drusi Megget	4,119	7.81	−1.09
Sustainable Australia	Jan Burgess	2,858	5.42	+5.42
Total formal votes		52,735	96.40	−0.79
Informal votes		1,971	3.60	+0.79
Turnout		54,706	91.22	−0.30
Two-party-preferred result
National	Leslie Williams	34,725	70.27	+1.32
Labor	Peter Alley	14,690	29.73	−1.32
National hold		Swing	+1.32	

=== Port Stephens ===
2019 New South Wales state election: Port Stephens
Party	Candidate	Votes	%	±%
Labor	Kate Washington	23,896	48.14	+1.02
Liberal	Jaimie Abbott	19,818	39.92	−1.03
Greens	Maureen Magee	1,885	3.80	−2.86
Independent	Bill Doran	1,756	3.54	+3.54
Animal Justice	Theresa Taylor	1,303	2.62	+2.62
Sustainable Australia	Bradley Jelfs	984	1.98	+1.98
Total formal votes		49,642	96.52	−0.17
Informal votes		1,790	3.48	+0.17
Turnout		51,432	91.07	−1.28
Two-party-preferred result
Labor	Kate Washington	25,766	55.75	+1.03
Liberal	Jaimie Abbott	20,448	44.25	−1.03
Labor hold		Swing	+1.03	

=== Prospect ===
2019 New South Wales state election: Prospect
Party	Candidate	Votes	%	±%
Labor	Hugh McDermott	24,235	51.73	+6.94
Liberal	Matthew Hana	15,851	33.84	−4.61
Independent	Milan Maksimovic	2,950	6.30	+6.30
Greens	Dorothea Newland	2,345	5.01	−1.80
Animal Justice	Catherine Ward	1,464	3.13	+3.13
Total formal votes		46,845	95.43	+0.26
Informal votes		2,242	4.57	−0.26
Turnout		49,087	90.20	−1.23
Two-party-preferred result
Labor	Hugh McDermott	26,008	60.66	+7.26
Liberal	Matthew Hana	16,867	39.34	−7.26
Labor hold		Swing	+7.26	

=== Riverstone ===
2019 New South Wales state election: Riverstone
Party	Candidate	Votes	%	±%
Liberal	Kevin Conolly	28,956	54.11	−1.08
Labor	Annemarie Christie	21,328	39.86	+8.30
Greens	Alex Van Vucht	3,226	6.03	+0.62
Total formal votes		53,510	97.08	+0.27
Informal votes		1,612	2.92	−0.27
Turnout		55,122	92.02	−1.01
Two-party-preferred result
Liberal	Kevin Conolly	29,337	56.34	−5.90
Labor	Annemarie Christie	22,735	43.66	+5.90
Liberal hold		Swing	−5.90	

=== Rockdale ===
2019 New South Wales state election: Rockdale
Party	Candidate	Votes	%	±%
Labor	Steve Kamper	21,945	45.82	−0.08
Liberal	Sam Hassan	16,118	33.65	−5.63
Greens	Peter Strong	3,829	8.00	+1.09
Keep Sydney Open	George Tulloch	2,865	5.98	+5.98
Animal Justice	Paul Collaros	1,800	3.76	+3.76
Independent	Hussein Faraj	1,335	2.79	+2.79
Total formal votes		47,892	95.38	−0.21
Informal votes		2,318	4.62	+0.21
Turnout		50,210	88.99	−1.01
Two-party-preferred result
Labor	Steve Kamper	25,077	59.55	+4.80
Liberal	Sam Hassan	17,037	40.45	−4.80
Labor hold		Swing	+4.80	

=== Ryde ===
2019 New South Wales state election: Ryde
Party	Candidate	Votes	%	±%
Liberal	Victor Dominello	24,045	49.59	−4.15
Labor	Jerome Laxale	14,750	30.42	+1.52
Greens	Lindsay Peters	4,206	8.67	−2.81
Christian Democrats	Julie Worsley	2,058	4.24	+0.03
Keep Sydney Open	Sophie Khatchigian	1,336	2.76	+2.76
Conservatives	Steve Busch	850	1.75	+1.75
Sustainable Australia	Mark Larsen	835	1.72	+1.72
Liberal Democrats	Christopher De Bruyne	412	0.85	+0.85
Total formal votes		48,492	97.29	+0.33
Informal votes		1,351	2.71	−0.33
Turnout		49,843	90.82	−0.51
Two-party-preferred result
Liberal	Victor Dominello	26,032	58.96	−2.55
Labor	Jerome Laxale	18,123	41.04	+2.55
Liberal hold		Swing	−2.55	

=== Seven Hills ===
2019 New South Wales state election: Seven Hills
Party	Candidate	Votes	%	±%
Liberal	Mark Taylor	23,548	50.13	+0.44
Labor	Durga Owen	16,909	35.99	+3.45
Greens	Damien Atkins	3,038	6.47	−0.66
Independent	Alan Sexton	1,844	3.93	+3.93
Sustainable Australia	Eric Claus	863	1.84	+1.84
Conservatives	Jude D'Cruz	775	1.65	+1.65
Total formal votes		46,977	96.76	+0.63
Informal votes		1,572	3.24	−0.63
Turnout		48,549	90.45	−1.35
Two-party-preferred result
Liberal	Mark Taylor	24,518	56.36	−2.39
Labor	Durga Owen	18,988	43.64	+2.39
Liberal hold		Swing	−2.39	

=== Shellharbour ===
2019 New South Wales state election: Shellharbour
Party	Candidate	Votes	%	±%
Labor	Anna Watson	31,532	57.50	+4.76
Liberal	Shane Bitschkat	14,924	27.21	+1.48
Greens	Jamie Dixon	5,158	9.41	+0.09
Sustainable Australia	Ken Davis	3,226	5.88	+5.88
Total formal votes		54,840	95.17	−0.40
Informal votes		2,783	4.83	+0.40
Turnout		57,623	91.60	−0.20
Two-party-preferred result
Labor	Anna Watson	34,435	68.27	+1.30
Liberal	Shane Bitschkat	16,005	31.73	−1.30
Labor hold		Swing	+1.30	

=== South Coast ===
2019 New South Wales state election: South Coast
Party	Candidate	Votes	%	±%
Liberal	Shelley Hancock	27,143	55.53	+3.04
Labor	Annette Alldrick	15,256	31.21	+0.83
Greens	Kim Stephenson	6,481	13.26	+0.32
Total formal votes		48,880	96.06	−0.86
Informal votes		2,007	3.94	+0.86
Turnout		50,887	89.40	−0.79
Two-party-preferred result
Liberal	Shelley Hancock	27,902	60.55	+0.93
Labor	Annette Alldrick	18,178	39.45	−0.93
Liberal hold		Swing	+0.93	

=== Strathfield ===
2019 New South Wales state election: Strathfield
Party	Candidate	Votes	%	±%
Labor	Jodi McKay	20,475	44.30	+1.95
Liberal	Philip Madirazza	17,972	38.89	−3.82
Greens	Crisetta MacLeod	4,061	8.79	−0.43
Keep Sydney Open	Vinayak Orekondy	1,443	3.12	+3.12
Conservatives	Jack Liang	1,237	2.68	+2.68
Animal Justice	Simon Fletcher	1,029	2.23	+2.23
Total formal votes		46,217	96.98	+0.15
Informal votes		1,437	3.02	−0.15
Turnout		47,654	89.15	−1.52
Two-party-preferred result
Labor	Jodi McKay	23,519	55.00	+3.22
Liberal	Philip Madirazza	19,245	45.00	−3.22
Labor hold		Swing	+3.22	

=== Summer Hill ===
2019 New South Wales state election: Summer Hill
Party	Candidate	Votes	%	±%
Labor	Jo Haylen	22,639	46.41	+3.14
Liberal	Leo Wei	11,380	23.33	−0.50
Greens	Tom Raue	10,055	20.61	−6.70
Keep Sydney Open	Andrea Makris	2,791	5.72	+5.72
Animal Justice	Teresa Romanovsky	1,227	2.52	+2.52
Sustainable Australia	Dale Sinden	693	1.42	+1.42
Total formal votes		48,785	97.11	+0.45
Informal votes		1,451	2.89	−0.45
Turnout		50,236	88.84	−1.06
Two-party-preferred result
Labor	Jo Haylen	32,023	72.30	+2.16
Liberal	Leo Wei	12,271	27.70	−2.16
Labor hold		Swing	+2.16	

=== Swansea ===
2019 New South Wales state election: Swansea
Party	Candidate	Votes	%	±%
Labor	Yasmin Catley	24,371	49.54	+4.51
Liberal	Dean Bowman	16,123	32.78	+6.86
Greens	Doug Williamson	3,428	6.97	+1.12
Animal Justice	Julia Riseley	2,714	5.52	+2.61
Conservatives	Glenn Seddon	2,556	5.20	+5.20
Total formal votes		49,192	95.67	−0.63
Informal votes		2,224	4.33	+0.63
Turnout		51,416	90.71	−1.27
Two-party-preferred result
Labor	Yasmin Catley	26,792	60.56	−2.42
Liberal	Dean Bowman	17,449	39.44	+2.42
Labor hold		Swing	−2.42	

=== Sydney ===
2019 New South Wales state election: Sydney
Party	Candidate	Votes	%	±%
Independent	Alex Greenwich	17,905	41.45	+1.80
Liberal	Lyndon Gannon	13,089	30.30	−2.54
Labor	Jo Holder	6,370	14.75	+0.00
Greens	Jonathan Harms	4,124	9.55	−0.18
Small Business	Fiona Douskou	1,017	2.35	+2.35
Sustainable Australia	Christopher Thomas	696	1.61	+1.61
Total formal votes		43,201	98.17	+0.56
Informal votes		807	1.83	−0.56
Turnout		44,008	79.82	−2.64
Two-party-preferred result
Liberal	Lyndon Gannon	16,259	52.96	−3.70
Labor	Jo Holder	14,444	47.04	+3.70
Two-candidate-preferred result
Independent	Alex Greenwich	22,841	61.77	+3.70
Liberal	Lyndon Gannon	14,134	38.23	−3.70
Independent hold		Swing	+3.70	

=== Tamworth ===
2019 New South Wales state election: Tamworth
Party	Candidate	Votes	%	±%
National	Kevin Anderson	27,855	55.07	+0.00
Independent	Mark Rodda	8,283	16.38	+16.38
Shooters, Fishers, Farmers	Jeff Bacon	8,180	16.17	+16.17
Labor	Steve Mears	4,133	8.17	+2.40
Greens	Robin Gunning	1,367	2.70	+0.57
Animal Justice	Emma Hall	760	1.50	+1.50
Total formal votes		50,578	97.80	+0.11
Informal votes		1,136	2.20	−0.11
Turnout		51,714	91.12	−1.07
Two-party-preferred result
National	Kevin Anderson	32,700	79.47	+0.53
Labor	Steve Mears	8,448	20.53	−0.53
Two-candidate-preferred result
National	Kevin Anderson	30,522	71.11	+11.07
Independent	Mark Rodda	12,403	28.89	−11.07
National hold		Swing	+11.07	

=== Terrigal ===
2019 New South Wales state election: Terrigal
Party	Candidate	Votes	%	±%
Liberal	Adam Crouch	26,580	52.86	+1.10
Labor	Jeff Sundstrom	13,134	26.12	−5.26
Greens	Bob Doyle	5,073	10.09	−1.74
Independent	Gary Chestnut	1,758	3.50	+3.50
Animal Justice	Flavia Coleman	1,542	3.07	+3.07
Conservatives	Ross Blaikie	1,202	2.39	+2.39
Sustainable Australia	Wayne Rigg	995	1.98	+1.98
Total formal votes		50,284	96.76	−0.02
Informal votes		1,682	3.24	+0.02
Turnout		51,966	90.37	−0.67
Two-party-preferred result
Liberal	Adam Crouch	27,802	62.34	+3.32
Labor	Jeff Sundstrom	16,794	37.66	−3.32
Liberal hold		Swing	+3.32	

=== The Entrance ===
2019 New South Wales state election: The Entrance
Party	Candidate	Votes	%	±%
Labor	David Mehan	20,744	43.14	+1.26
Liberal	Brian Perrem	18,145	37.73	−6.15
Greens	Stephen Pearson	3,691	7.68	−1.69
Animal Justice	Maddy Richards	2,034	4.23	+4.23
Keep Sydney Open	Jake Fitzpatrick	1,263	2.63	+2.63
Sustainable Australia	Margaret Jones	1,218	2.53	+2.53
Conservatives	Hadden Ervin	991	2.06	+2.06
Total formal votes		48,086	95.76	−0.53
Informal votes		2,130	4.24	+0.53
Turnout		50,216	89.09	−1.37
Two-party-preferred result
Labor	David Mehan	23,661	55.22	+4.84
Liberal	Brian Perrem	19,189	44.78	−4.84
Labor hold		Swing	+4.84	

=== Tweed ===
2019 New South Wales state election: Tweed
Party	Candidate	Votes	%	±%
National	Geoff Provest	22,185	47.55	+0.48
Labor	Craig Elliot	14,449	30.97	−4.94
Greens	Bill Fenelon	6,461	13.85	+0.58
Animal Justice	Susie Hearder	1,790	3.84	+3.84
Sustainable Australia	Ronald McDonald	1,776	3.81	+3.81
Total formal votes		46,661	96.01	−0.56
Informal votes		1,937	3.99	+0.56
Turnout		48,598	85.35	−0.20
Two-party-preferred result
National	Geoff Provest	23,243	54.97	+1.78
Labor	Craig Elliot	19,040	45.03	−1.78
National hold		Swing	+1.78	

=== Upper Hunter ===
2019 New South Wales state election: Upper Hunter
Party	Candidate	Votes	%	±%
National	Michael Johnsen	16,492	33.99	−4.88
Labor	Melanie Dagg	13,900	28.65	−3.89
Shooters, Fishers, Farmers	Lee Watts	10,697	22.04	+22.04
Greens	Tony Lonergan	2,320	4.78	−0.73
Liberal Democrats	Mark Ellis	2,151	4.43	+4.43
Sustainable Australia	Calum Blair	1,077	2.22	+2.22
Animal Justice	Claire Robertson	961	1.98	+1.98
Christian Democrats	Richard Stretton	927	1.91	−0.21
Total formal votes		48,525	96.61	−0.30
Informal votes		1,701	3.39	+0.30
Turnout		50,226	90.54	−0.70
Two-party-preferred result
National	Michael Johnsen	19,341	52.56	+0.35
Labor	Melanie Dagg	17,456	47.44	−0.35
National hold		Swing	+0.35	

=== Vaucluse ===
2019 New South Wales state election: Vaucluse
Party	Candidate	Votes	%	±%
Liberal	Gabrielle Upton	26,397	57.36	−8.21
Greens	Megan McEwin	6,494	14.11	−4.44
Labor	Lenore Kulakauskas	5,881	12.78	−0.42
Keep Sydney Open	Mark Macsmith	3,683	8.00	+8.00
Independent	Miriam Guttman-Jones	2,284	4.96	+4.96
Animal Justice	Deb Doyle	664	1.44	+1.44
Sustainable Australia	Kay Dunne	620	1.35	+1.35
Total formal votes		46,023	98.17	+0.62
Informal votes		856	1.83	−0.62
Turnout		46,879	83.05	−2.12
Two-party-preferred result
Liberal	Gabrielle Upton	28,616	70.58	−4.72
Labor	Lenore Kulakauskas	11,927	29.42	+4.72
Two-candidate-preferred result
Liberal	Gabrielle Upton	28,260	69.32	−3.61
Greens	Megan McEwin	12,506	30.68	+3.61
Liberal hold		Swing	−3.61	

=== Wagga Wagga ===
2019 New South Wales state election: Wagga Wagga
Party	Candidate	Votes	%	±%
Independent	Joe McGirr	21,682	44.63	+19.23
National	Mackenna Powell	12,635	26.01	+26.01
Labor	Dan Hayes	7,141	14.70	−9.00
Shooters, Fishers, Farmers	Seb McDonagh	4,242	8.73	+1.17
Greens	Ray Goodlass	1,346	2.77	−0.13
Conservatives	Colin Taggart	843	1.74	+1.74
Independent	Matt Quade	689	1.42	+1.42
Total formal votes		48,578	96.80	+0.01
Informal votes		1,607	3.20	−0.01
Turnout		50,185	90.12	−0.14
Two-party-preferred result
National	Mackenna Powell	18,055	57.51	+57.51
Labor	Dan Hayes	13,338	42.49	−7.61
Two-candidate-preferred result
Independent	Joe McGirr	26,869	65.47	+5.87
National	Mackenna Powell	14,169	34.53	+34.53
Independent hold		Swing	+5.87	

Note that the swing here is relative to the 2018 Wagga Wagga state by-election.

=== Wakehurst ===
2019 New South Wales state election: Wakehurst
Party	Candidate	Votes	%	±%
Liberal	Brad Hazzard	28,704	58.93	−4.99
Labor	Chris Sharpe	8,600	17.65	+2.23
Greens	Lilith Zaharias	4,867	9.99	−1.97
Keep Sydney Open	Katika Schultz	1,928	3.96	+3.96
Animal Justice	Susan Sorensen	1,685	3.46	+3.46
Independent	Darren Hough	1,606	3.30	+3.30
Sustainable Australia	Greg Mawson	1,322	2.71	+2.71
Total formal votes		48,712	96.94	+0.39
Informal votes		1,537	3.06	−0.39
Turnout		50,249	90.03	−1.52
Two-party-preferred result
Liberal	Brad Hazzard	30,182	71.00	−4.24
Labor	Chris Sharpe	12,326	29.00	+4.24
Liberal hold		Swing	−4.24	

=== Wallsend ===
2019 New South Wales state election: Wallsend
Party	Candidate	Votes	%	±%
Labor	Sonia Hornery	31,998	62.31	+3.90
Liberal	Nicholas Trappett	10,458	20.37	−4.36
Greens	Sinead Francis-Coan	4,756	9.26	−1.46
Animal Justice	Toni Gundry	2,170	4.23	+4.23
Conservatives	Fiona De Vries	1,969	3.83	+3.83
Total formal votes		51,351	96.52	+0.45
Informal votes		1,851	3.48	−0.45
Turnout		53,202	90.10	−1.47
Two-party-preferred result
Labor	Sonia Hornery	35,605	75.44	+4.64
Liberal	Nicholas Trappett	11,591	24.56	−4.64
Labor hold		Swing	+4.64	

=== Willoughby ===
2019 New South Wales state election: Willoughby
Party	Candidate	Votes	%	±%
Liberal	Gladys Berejiklian	27,292	57.03	−6.52
Labor	Justin Reiss	6,875	14.37	−1.50
Greens	Daniel Keogh	5,342	11.16	−4.71
Independent	Larissa Penn	4,742	9.91	+9.91
Keep Sydney Open	Tom Crowley	1,403	2.93	+2.93
Animal Justice	Emma Bennett	1,040	2.17	+2.17
Sustainable Australia	Greg Graham	779	1.63	+1.63
Flux	Meow-Ludo Meow-Meow	384	0.80	+0.80
Total formal votes		47,857	98.09	+0.53
Informal votes		934	1.91	−0.53
Turnout		48,791	89.51	−0.87
Two-party-preferred result
Liberal	Gladys Berejiklian	29,142	71.03	−3.44
Labor	Justin Reiss	11,885	28.97	+3.44
Liberal hold		Swing	−3.44	

=== Wollondilly ===
2019 New South Wales state election: Wollondilly
Party	Candidate	Votes	%	±%
Liberal	Nathaniel Smith	19,351	37.95	−20.00
Independent	Judy Hannan	10,258	20.12	+20.12
Labor	Jo-Ann Davidson	7,723	15.15	−9.08
One Nation	Charlie Fenton	5,712	11.20	+11.20
Shooters, Fishers, Farmers	Jason Bolwell	3,235	6.34	+6.34
Greens	David Powell	2,847	5.58	−2.80
Animal Justice	Heather Edwards	1,326	2.60	+2.60
Liberal Democrats	Mitchell Black	537	1.05	+1.05
Total formal votes		50,989	96.35	+0.11
Informal votes		1,934	3.65	−0.11
Turnout		52,923	92.21	−0.69
Two-party-preferred result
Liberal	Nathaniel Smith	22,925	63.83	−3.46
Labor	Jo-Ann Davidson	12,988	36.17	+3.46
Two-candidate-preferred result
Liberal	Nathaniel Smith	21,113	55.50	−11.80
Independent	Judy Hannan	16,931	44.50	+44.50
Liberal hold		Swing	−11.80	

=== Wollongong ===
2019 New South Wales state election: Wollongong
Party	Candidate	Votes	%	±%
Labor	Paul Scully	25,776	50.11	+9.74
Liberal	Zachary Fitzpatrick	11,427	22.22	+1.17
Greens	Benjamin Arcioni	6,583	12.80	+3.25
Independent	Nikola Nastoski	2,830	5.50	+5.50
Sustainable Australia	Andrew Anthony	2,242	4.36	+4.36
Animal Justice	Benjamin Bank	1,541	3.00	+3.00
Keep Sydney Open	James Hehir	1,036	2.01	+2.01
Total formal votes		51,435	95.54	−0.36
Informal votes		2,400	4.46	+0.36
Turnout		53,835	88.50	−0.59
Two-party-preferred result
Labor	Paul Scully	31,357	71.37	+7.93
Liberal	Zachary Fitzpatrick	12,580	28.63	−7.93
Labor hold		Swing	+7.93	

=== Wyong ===
2019 New South Wales state election: Wyong
Party	Candidate	Votes	%	±%
Labor	David Harris	25,077	52.11	+0.96
Liberal	Ying Shu Li-Cantwell	15,338	31.87	−4.89
Greens	Sue Wynn	4,553	9.46	+2.75
Conservatives	Martin Stevenson	3,153	6.55	+6.55
Total formal votes		48,121	94.77	−0.91
Informal votes		2,655	5.23	+0.91
Turnout		50,776	88.34	−2.40
Two-party-preferred result
Labor	David Harris	27,296	62.45	+3.72
Liberal	Ying Shu Li-Cantwell	16,415	37.55	−3.72
Labor hold		Swing	+3.72	

== Preference flows ==
Minor party preference flows
Party	Coalition	Labor	Exhausted
Party	%	%	%
Greens	7.8%	52.5%	39.7%
SFF	16.7%	16.4%	66.9%
Sustainable Australia	17.7%	23.9%	58.4%
Keep Sydney Open	14.6%	35.8%	49.6%
Animal Justice	12.1%	27.3%	60.6%
One Nation	18.0%	11.7%	71.1%
Christian Democrats	33.4%	11.7%	54.9%
Conservative	32.1%	11.2%	56.7%
Liberal Democrats	23.7%	8.2%	68.1%
Independent	17.2%	22.3%	60.5%
Others	19.3%	24.0%	56.7%
