= 2019 New South Wales state election =

State election for New South Wales, Australia in March 2019

- 23 March 2019

All 93 seats in the Legislative Assembly and 21 (of the 42) seats in the Legislative Council 47 Assembly seats were needed for a majority
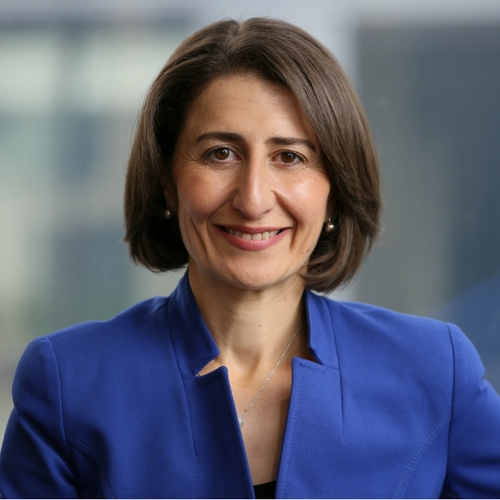

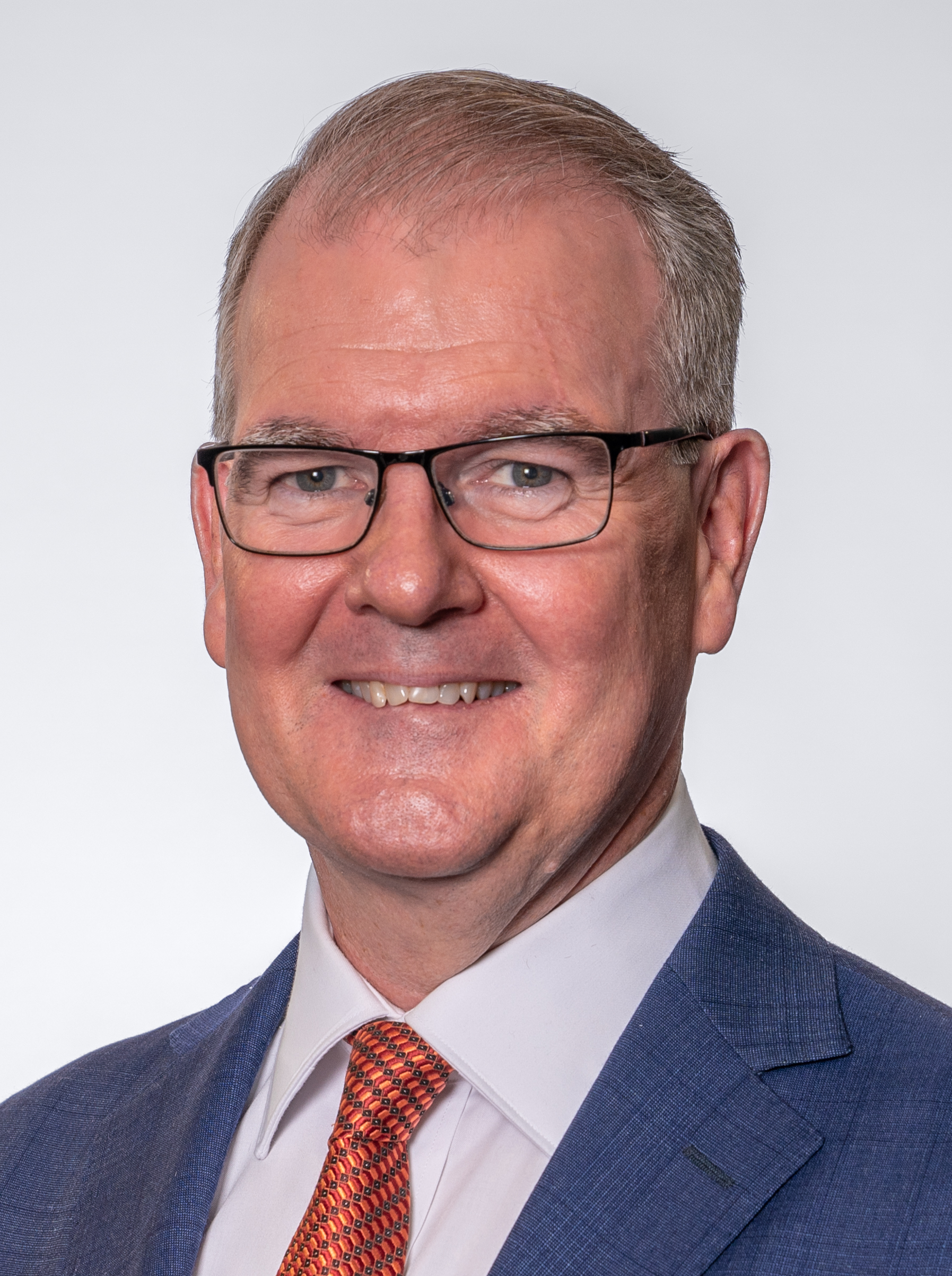

	First party	Second party
Leader	Gladys Berejiklian	Michael Daley
Party	Liberal/National coalition	Labor
Leader since	23 January 2017	10 November 2018
Leader's seat	Willoughby	Maroubra
Last election	54 seats	34 seats
Seats won	48	36
Seat change	▼6	▲2
Popular vote	1,892,816	1,516,143
Percentage	41.58%	33.31%
Swing	▼4.05	▼0.77
TPP	52.02%	47.98%
TPP swing	▼2.30	▲2.30
	Third party	Fourth party
		SFF
Leader	No leader	Robert Borsak
Party	Greens	SFF
Leader since	N/A
Leader's seat	N/A	Legislative Council
Last election	3 seats	0 seats
Seats won	3	3
Seat change	Steady	▲3
Popular vote	435,401	157,636
Percentage	9.57%	3.46%
Swing	▼0.72	▲3.46
- Two-candidate-preferred margin by electorate
Premier before election
Gladys Berejiklian
Liberal/National coalition
Premier after election
Gladys Berejiklian
Liberal/National coalition

The 2019 New South Wales state election was held on Saturday 23 March 2019 to elect the 57th Parliament of New South Wales, including all 93 seats in the Legislative Assembly and 21 of the 42 seats in the Legislative Council. The election was conducted by the New South Wales Electoral Commission (NSWEC).

The two-term incumbent Liberal/National Coalition Government led by Premier Gladys Berejiklian and Deputy Premier John Barilaro was re-elected to a third four-year term with a reduced majority in the Legislative Assembly, where government is formed. The main Opposition Labor Party under Michael Daley won an increased share of the vote in most districts, though the party was unable to successfully gain support in key marginal electorates. Minor parties the Greens and the Shooters, Fishers and Farmers Party, as well as several independent MPs, also contested the election.

The Coalition won 48 seats (35 Liberal, 13 National), suffering a loss of four seats from the preceding election and providing the incumbent government with a slim three-seat majority. The Labor Party won 36 seats, an increase of two seats. Labor, and to a larger extent the Coalition, both suffered primary vote swings against them. Minor parties the Greens and the Shooters, Fishers and Farmers each won three seats, and they were joined on the crossbench by three independents.

In the Legislative Council, 21 seats were up for election. The Coalition won eight seats, Labor seven, the Greens and One Nation each picked up two seats, whilst the Shooters, Fishers and Farmers Party and Animal Justice Party claimed one seat each. One Nation's lead candidate Mark Latham, who led the Labor Party to defeat at the 2004 federal election, was elected to the Council. In total the Coalition held 17 seats, Labor 14 and crossbenchers of other parties held 11. The result left the Berejiklian Government needing at least five votes to pass legislation, down from the two they needed in the previous Council.

It was the first time that the Coalition won a third consecutive term in office in New South Wales since the 1971 state election. Berejiklian became the first woman to lead a party to a state election victory in New South Wales, as well as the third woman to lead a party to a victory at a state election in Australia (after Queensland's Anna Bligh and Annastacia Palaszczuk) and the first non-Labor woman to do so.

Daley had initially indicated that he would stay on as leader despite the loss. However, facing the prospect of a leadership spill, Daley announced several days after the election that he would stand down as leader and not contest a subsequent leadership election, to be held after the federal election in May. Deputy leader Penny Sharpe served as interim leader of the party in the intervening period. That leadership election was subsequently held, and Strathfield MP Jodi McKay was elected as Labor Party Leader, against Kogarah MP Chris Minns.

New South Wales has compulsory voting, with optional preferential voting in single-member seats for the lower house and single transferable vote with optional preferential above-the-line voting in the proportionally represented upper house.

== Results ==
ABC election analyst Antony Green called the election for the Coalition at about 8:15pm, over two hours after the 6:00pm close of polling booths. However, it took a further two full days of official vote counting by the electoral commission before the ABC election computer was able to project that the Coalition had retained majority government.

=== Legislative Assembly ===
Winning party by electorate

Government (48) Liberal (35) Nationals (13) Opposition (36) Labor (36) Crossbench (9) Greens (3) Shooters (3) Independent (3) (Note: independent MLAs: Alex Greenwich (Sydney), Joe McGirr (Wagga Wagga) and Greg Piper (Lake Macquarie))

Legislative Assembly (IRV) – (CV)
Party	Votes	%	Swing	Seats	Change
Liberal	1,456,010	31.99	▼−3.10	35	▼1
National	436,806	9.60	▼−0.95	13	▼3
Coalition total	1,892,816	41.58	▼−4.05	48	▼4
Labor	1,516,143	33.31	▼−0.77	36	▲2
Greens	435,401	9.57	▼−0.72	3	Steady
Shooters, Fishers and Farmers	157,636	3.46	New	3	▲2
Sustainable Australia	69,831	1.53	New	0	Steady
Keep Sydney Open	69,076	1.52	New	0	Steady
Animal Justice	68,802	1.51	▲+1.39	0	Steady
One Nation	49,948	1.10	New	0	Steady
Christian Democratic	36,575	0.80	▼−2.31	0	Steady
Conservatives	22,590	0.50	New	0	Steady
Liberal Democrats	10,530	0.23	New	0	Steady
Small Business	3,355	0.07	New	0	Steady
Socialist Alliance	1,208	0.03	−0.00	0	Steady
Flux	698	0.02	New	0	Steady
Independents	217,277	4.77	▲+0.43	3	Steady
Formal votes	4,551,886	96.54	–	–	–
Informal votes	162,897	3.46	–	–	–
Total	4,714,783	100	–	93	–
Registered voters / turnout	5,271,775	89.43	–	–	–
Two-party-preferred vote
Coalition	2,053,185	52.02	▼−2.30	–	–
Labor	1,893,618	47.98	▲+2.30	–	–

Compared with results from 2015 election.

Popular vote
Labor	33.31%
Liberal	31.99%
National	9.60%
Greens	9.57%
SFF	3.46%
Independents	4.77%
Other	7.30%
Two-party-preferred vote
Coalition	52.02%
Labor	47.98%
Parliamentary seats
Coalition	48
Labor	36
Greens	3
SFF	3
Independents	3

Seats changing hands
Seat	2015 election			Swing	2019 election		
Seat	Party	Member	Margin	Swing	Margin	Member	Party
Barwon	National	Kevin Humphries	12.88	19.49	6.60	Roy Butler	SFF
Coogee	Liberal	Bruce Notley-Smith	2.92	4.56	1.64	Marjorie O'Neill	Labor
Lismore	National	Thomas George	0.23	1.57	1.35	Janelle Saffin	Labor
Murray	National	Austin Evans	22.65*	26.19	3.54	Helen Dalton	SFF
*At the 2017 Murray by-election, while the Nationals retained the seat on a 3.3-point margin despite a very large swing, their 22.7-point margin in 2015 is used for swing calculations. Note: At the 2016 Orange and 2018 Wagga Wagga by-elections, the remaining two of the six total seats lost by the Coalition since 2015 occurred from even larger swings, both won by two new crossbenchers.

=== Post-election pendulum ===
Government seats
Marginal
East Hills	Wendy Lindsay	LIB v ALP	0.5
Penrith	Stuart Ayres	LIB v ALP	1.3
Dubbo	Dugald Saunders	NAT v IND	2.0
Upper Hunter	Michael Johnsen	NAT v ALP	2.6
Holsworthy	Melanie Gibbons	LIB v ALP	3.3
Goulburn	Wendy Tuckerman	LIB v ALP	3.5
Tweed	Geoff Provest	NAT v ALP	5.0
Heathcote	Lee Evans	LIB v ALP	5.0
Wollondilly	Nathaniel Smith	LIB v IND	5.5
Fairly safe
Riverstone	Kevin Conolly	LIB v ALP	6.3
Seven Hills	Mark Taylor	LIB v ALP	6.4
Bega	Andrew Constance	LIB v ALP	6.9
Camden	Peter Sidgreaves	LIB v ALP	7.6
Ryde	Victor Dominello	LIB v ALP	9.0
Myall Lakes	Stephen Bromhead	NAT v ALP	9.2
Safe
Coffs Harbour	Gurmesh Singh	NAT v IND	10.3
Oatley	Mark Coure	LIB v ALP	10.5
Parramatta	Geoff Lee	LIB v ALP	10.6
South Coast	Shelley Hancock	LIB v ALP	10.6
North Shore	Felicity Wilson	LIB v IND	11.1
Mulgoa	Tanya Davies	LIB v ALP	11.3
Monaro	John Barilaro	NAT v ALP	11.6
Kiama	Gareth Ward	LIB v ALP	12.0
Terrigal	Adam Crouch	LIB v ALP	12.3
Epping	Dominic Perrottet	LIB v ALP	12.4
Manly	James Griffin	LIB v GRN	12.9
Lane Cove	Anthony Roberts	LIB v ALP	14.3
Clarence	Chris Gulaptis	NAT v ALP	14.5
Miranda	Eleni Petinos	LIB v ALP	14.6
Oxley	Melinda Pavey	NAT v ALP	14.9
Drummoyne	John Sidoti	LIB v ALP	15.0
Albury	Justin Clancy	LIB v ALP	16.0
Hornsby	Matt Kean	LIB v ALP	16.3
Hawkesbury	Robyn Preston	LIB v ALP	17.5
Bathurst	Paul Toole	NAT v ALP	17.9
Baulkham Hills	David Elliott	LIB v ALP	18.7
Vaucluse	Gabrielle Upton	LIB v GRN	19.3
Cronulla	Mark Speakman	LIB v ALP	19.6
Very safe
Port Macquarie	Leslie Williams	NAT v ALP	20.3
Ku-ring-gai	Alister Henskens	LIB v ALP	20.5
Pittwater	Rob Stokes	LIB v GRN	20.8
Willoughby	Gladys Berejiklian	LIB v ALP	21.0
Wakehurst	Brad Hazzard	LIB v ALP	21.0
Tamworth	Kevin Anderson	NAT v IND	21.1
Castle Hill	Ray Williams	LIB v ALP	24.7
Davidson	Jonathan O'Dea	LIB v GRN	25.2
Cootamundra	Steph Cooke	NAT v ALP	27.1
Northern Tablelands	Adam Marshall	NAT v ALP	32.8

Non-government seats
Marginal
Lismore	Janelle Saffin	ALP v NAT	1.3
Coogee	Marjorie O'Neill	ALP v LIB	1.6
Kogarah	Chris Minns	ALP v LIB	1.8
Strathfield	Jodi McKay	ALP v LIB	5.0
The Entrance	David Mehan	ALP v LIB	5.2
Port Stephens	Kate Washington	ALP v LIB	5.7
Fairly safe
Londonderry	Prue Car	ALP v LIB	6.5
Gosford	Liesl Tesch	ALP v LIB	7.3
Granville	Julia Finn	ALP v LIB	7.6
Maroubra	Michael Daley	ALP v LIB	8.5
Auburn	Lynda Voltz	ALP v LIB	9.1
Rockdale	Steve Kamper	ALP v LIB	9.5
Safe
Swansea	Yasmin Catley	ALP v LIB	10.6
Prospect	Hugh McDermott	ALP v LIB	10.7
Wyong	David Harris	ALP v LIB	12.4
Charlestown	Jodie Harrison	ALP v LIB	12.4
Cabramatta	Nick Lalich	ALP v IND	12.9
Canterbury	Sophie Cotsis	ALP v LIB	13.0
Maitland	Jenny Aitchison	ALP v LIB	13.2
Bankstown	Tania Mihailuk	ALP v LIB	13.8
Macquarie Fields	Anoulack Chanthivong	ALP v LIB	14.8
Blue Mountains	Trish Doyle	ALP v LIB	14.9
Heffron	Ron Hoenig	ALP v LIB	15.1
Mount Druitt	Edmond Atalla	ALP v LIB	16.4
Liverpool	Paul Lynch	ALP v LIB	16.7
Campbelltown	Greg Warren	ALP v LIB	17.0
Blacktown	Stephen Bali	ALP v LIB	17.7
Newcastle	Tim Crakanthorp	ALP v LIB	17.7
Fairfield	Guy Zangari	ALP v LIB	17.9
Shellharbour	Anna Watson	ALP v LIB	18.3
Cessnock	Clayton Barr	ALP v NAT	19.3
Keira	Ryan Park	ALP v LIB	19.7
Very safe
Wollongong	Paul Scully	ALP v LIB	21.4
Summer Hill	Jo Haylen	ALP v LIB	22.3
Lakemba	Jihad Dib	ALP v LIB	22.4
Wallsend	Sonia Hornery	ALP v LIB	25.4
Crossbench seats
Murray	Helen Dalton	SFF v NAT	3.5
Ballina	Tamara Smith	GRN v NAT	5.4
Barwon	Roy Butler	SFF v NAT	6.6
Balmain	Jamie Parker	GRN v ALP	10.0
Sydney	Alex Greenwich	IND v LNP	11.8
Newtown	Jenny Leong	GRN v ALP	13.8
Orange	Philip Donato	SFF v NAT	15.2
Wagga Wagga	Joe McGirr	IND v NAT	15.5
Lake Macquarie	Greg Piper	IND v ALP	22.1

=== Legislative Council ===
Government (17) Liberal (11) National (6) Opposition (14) Labor (14) Crossbench (11) Greens (3) One Nation (2) Animal Justice (2) Shooters (2) Christian Democrats (1) Independent (1) (Note: The current independent MLC is Justin Field, who was elected as a member of the Greens in 2016 following the death of John Kaye MLC, but left the party in April 2019.)

Legislative Council (STV) – Quota 202,325 – (CV)
Party	Votes	%	Swing	2019 seats	2015 seats	Total seats	Change
Liberal/National joint ticket	1,530,542	34.39	▼−7.91	–	–	–	–
Liberal	16,117	0.37	▲+0.10	5	6	11	▼2
National	3,092	0.06	+0.00	3	3	6	▼1
Coalition total	1,549,751	34.82	▼−7.80	8	9	17	▼3
Labor	1,321,449	29.69	▼−1.40	7	7	14	▲2
Greens	432,999	9.73	▼−0.19	2	2	4 (Note: This figure includes Justin Field MLC, who was not up for election this year. He left the Greens to sit as an independent in April 2019, before the final composition of the Council was determined.)	▼1
One Nation	306,933	6.90	New	2	0	2	▲2
Shooters, Fishers and Farmers	246,477	5.54	▲+1.65	1	1	2	Steady
Christian Democratic	101,328	2.28	▼−0.65	0	1	1	▼1
Liberal Democrats	96,999	2.18	New	0	0	0	Steady
Animal Justice	86,713	1.95	▲+0.17	1	1	2	▲1
Keep Sydney Open	81,508	1.83	New	0	0	0	Steady
Sustainable Australia	65,102	1.46	New	0	0	0	Steady
Voluntary Euthanasia	46,971	1.06	▲+0.11	0	0	0	Steady
Small Business	30,409	0.68	New	0	0	0	Steady
Conservatives	26,303	0.59	New	0	0	0	Steady
Flux	16,212	0.36	New	0	0	0	Steady
Socialist Alliance	13,194	0.32	▲+0.12	0	0	0	Steady
Group L	11,793	0.26	New	0	0	0	Steady
Group G	6,543	0.15	New	0	0	0	Steady
Advance Australia	3,928	0.09	−0.84 (Note: Combined vote totals of Building Australia and the Motorist Party, of which Advance Australia is a merger)	0	0	0	Steady
Group S	3,207	0.07	New	0	0	0	Steady
Group H	322	0.01	New	0	0	0	Steady
Ungrouped	2,005	0.05	▲+0.02	0	0	0	Steady
Formal votes	4,451,146	93.65	–	–	–	–	–
Informal votes	301,681	6.35	–	–	–	–	–
Total	4,752,827	100	–	21	21	42	–
Registered voters / turnout	5,271,775	90.16	–	–	–	–	–

== Background ==
=== Lower house and by-elections ===
At the 2015 election, the Coalition retained government with a reduced majority of 54 seats from 69 seats in the 2011 election. In the course of the previous parliamentary term, the Coalition had been reduced to 61 seats due to ICAC proceedings that resulted in the departure of eight MPs from the Liberal Party. The Labor Party gained 11 seats at the election, for a total of 34 seats. The Greens gained a record three seats whilst independents Greg Piper and Alex Greenwich both retained their seats.

Several by-elections were held after the 2015 election. In most of these, the party holding the seat did not change. There were two exceptions to this. In the 2016 Orange by-election, Philip Donato of the Shooters, Fishers and Farmers Party won the seat, previously held by the Nationals. In the 2018 Wagga Wagga by-election, independent candidate Joe McGirr won the seat, previously held by the Liberal Party.

=== Upper house ===
The 2015 election saw the incumbent Liberal/National coalition gain one seat in the Legislative Council to have a total of 20 seats, despite a 5.1-point swing against them. The Labor Party lost two seats, bringing their total down to 12; the Greens, Shooters and Fishers, and Christian Democrats saw no gains or losses in the election: these parties won five seats, two seats and two seats, respectively. The only gain came from the Animal Justice Party.

== Campaign ==
The Liberal Party campaign was launched by Premier Gladys Berejiklian on 10 March. The event was attended by Prime Minister Scott Morrison, former Prime Minister John Howard, and former New South Wales Premiers Mike Baird, Barry O'Farrell, John Fahey, and Nick Greiner. Berejiklian announced that, if re-elected, the government would spend $2 billion over four years to construct two new metro rail lines: one from the Sydney CBD to Parramatta and one from St Marys station to the planned Western Sydney Airport. She also pledged to build or upgrade 29 hospitals and clinics state-wide, including redevelopments of the Bankstown Lidcombe Hospital and John Hunter Hospital at a cost of $1.3 billion and $780 million, respectively. Another $917 million was pledged for the construction of eight new schools and the upgrade of 31 others. Another $120 million is to be spent expanding before and after school care to "ensure that every public primary school student in NSW can access before and after school care from 7 am to 6 pm."

The Labor Party campaign was launched by Opposition Leader Michael Daley on 10 March. The event was attended by federal Labor leader and Leader of the Opposition Bill Shorten, as well as former New South Wales Premiers Kristina Keneally, Bob Carr, and Barrie Unsworth. Daley committed to spending $2.7 billion over ten years to fund public schools, recruiting 5,000 new teachers and aiming to make New South Wales the first state to commit to the Gonski school funding model. $250 million was pledged in funding for mental health care, with Daley stating that Labor will hire more nurses in mental health wards and introduce nurse-to-patient ratios. Labor also committed to banning conversion therapy and decriminalisation of abortion and also to have abortion performed within public hospitals if elected. A $1 billion water fund was announced for the purpose of upgrading water infrastructure and protecting the water supply of regional communities, particularly in times of drought.

On 19 March, a September 2018 video surfaced in which opposition leader Daley made negative comments about Asian immigration in Sydney: "Our young children will flee and who are they being replaced with? They are being replaced by young people from typically Asia with PhDs... So there's a transformation happening in Sydney now where our kids are moving out and foreigners are moving in and taking their jobs." Daley apologised for his comments, stating "What I was referring to was housing affordability in Sydney ... I could've expressed myself better, no offence was meant." Despite the apology after the video's release the controversy dogged Mr Daley and Labor until the end of the campaign. The video is suggested to have ultimately cost Labor potential victory in a number of key seats in Sydney with large proportions of voters from Asian backgrounds, and was also likely held back until it would be politically most beneficial to the incumbent government.

Labor's preference deals with the Shooters, Fishers and Farmers Party was criticised by Premier Berejiklian, who suggested that a Labor government supported by the Shooters could lead to looser gun laws. Daley responded by pledging to resign from parliament if gun laws were changed, even if the measures were passed by the Coalition.

In light of the National Party's preference deal with the Liberal Democrats, Labor leader Daley accused Berejiklian of hypocrisy for criticising Labor's preference deals with the Shooters Party while her own coalition partner offered preferences to the Liberal Democrats, whose platform includes even more extreme positions on gun laws than the Shooters. Berejiklian stated that the deal was not comparable as it only concerned the upper house, and would not affect government formation, which occurs in the lower house.

=== Issues ===
The incumbent Liberal government planned to continue with the demolition of the Sydney Football Stadium and, if re-elected, to replace it with a new $730 million venue. The Labor Party opposed the demolition. The issue was thrust into the limelight by Peter FitzSimons, a local media figure, who remarked that he believed that the Government would not win the election unless they cancelled the stadium rebuild. Michael Daley seized on the apparent popularity of the anti-stadium movement to call the election a "referendum on stadiums", as well as touring a "campaign bus" with the slogan "Schools & Hospitals Before Stadiums" on the side.

In March, Labor unveiled its plan for a "war on waste", seeking to ban single-use plastic bags, phase out single-use plastic, and reduce waste and create jobs by investing $140 million in recycling initiatives.

Pauline Hanson's One Nation under the leadership of Mark Latham ran on a platform which opposed immigration, congestion, overdevelopment and renewable power, and proposed DNA tests for Aboriginal welfare recipients and banning the burqa in government buildings.

Daley proposed a plan to protect koalas and create a Great Koala National Park. He also vowed that a government led by Labor would invest in a new national park to comprise areas within south west Sydney.

=== Debates ===
The first debate of the campaign was held on 8 March on the ABC. It featured Premier Gladys Berejiklian and Opposition Leader Michael Daley, and was moderated by Brigid Glanville. Subjects discussed included the demolition of the Sydney Football Stadium, cost of living in Sydney, transportation, infrastructure, and the Murray–Darling basin. In their final remarks, Berejiklian pledged to continue the current course and finish pending projects, while Daley emphasised his commitment to regional voters and promised assistance for dairy farmers.

A second debate was held on 20 March on Sky News featuring Premier Gladys Berejiklian and Opposition Leader Michael Daley, moderated by David Speers. An audience of 100 undecided voters asked questions to the two leaders. Issues discussed included stadium funding, climate change, domestic violence, TAFE funding, the M4 motorway toll. When questioned on Labor's planned TAFE funding increase, Daley struggled to provide a precise figure before openly blurting out a figure of $3 billion, which drew laughter from the audience and an immediate "No!" from the Premier. The actual figure was only $74 million. Berejiklian was also unable to clarify whether motorists would be charged a toll to travel on the M4 from Parramatta to Penrith. The audience were subsequently asked who they were more inclined to vote for after the debate. 50 favoured Berejiklian, while 25 favoured Daley; a further 25 were undecided.

=== Preferences ===
In February 2019, it was reported that Shooters, Fishers and Farmers Party and Pauline Hanson's One Nation sent preferences each other's way in the upper house.

Labor leader Michael Daley said the party's head office, instead of the leader's, would decide preference deals on a "seat-by-seat basis". While refusing to rule out Labor dealing with the Shooters, Fishers and Farmers, Daley said Labor would not accept a preference deal with One Nation "because they are a racist party".

The National Party made preference deals with the Liberal Democrats and Christian Democratic Party in the Legislative Council, suggesting that voters give them second and third preferences respectively.

== Registered parties ==
18 parties were registered with the New South Wales Electoral Commission (NSWEC). All eighteen parties nominated candidates for election to the Legislative Council.

- Advance Australia Party
- Animal Justice Party
- Australian Conservatives
- Australian Labor Party
- Christian Democratic Party (Fred Nile Group)
- Country Labor Party
- Flux Party
- The Greens NSW
- Keep Sydney Open
- Liberal Democratic Party
- Liberal Party of Australia
- National Party of Australia
- Pauline Hanson's One Nation
- Shooters, Fishers and Farmers Party
- Small Business Party
- Socialist Alliance
- Sustainable Australia
- Voluntary Euthanasia Party

== Retiring MPs ==
The seat of Wollondilly was vacated following the resignation of Liberal MP Jai Rowell on 17 December 2018.

Members who chose not to renominate for the 2019 election were as follows:

=== Labor ===
- Luke Foley MP (Auburn) – announced 9 November 2018
- Ernest Wong MLC – lost preselection 12 June 2018

=== Liberal ===
- Greg Aplin MP (Albury) – announced 1 August 2018
- Glenn Brookes MP (East Hills) – announced 4 August 2018
- Pru Goward MP (Goulburn) – announced 19 December 2018
- Chris Patterson MP (Camden) – announced 28 September 2018
- David Clarke MLC – announced retirement September 2018
- Scot MacDonald MLC – announced 12 November 2018

=== Nationals ===
- Andrew Fraser MP (Coffs Harbour) – announced 14 June 2018
- Thomas George MP (Lismore) – announced 30 June 2017
- Troy Grant MP (Dubbo) – announced 12 July 2018
- Kevin Humphries MP (Barwon) – announced 1 June 2017
- Rick Colless MLC – did not nominate for endorsement

=== Shooters, Fishers and Farmers ===
- Robert Brown MLC – lost preselection 5 February 2019

== Date ==
The parliament has fixed four-year terms with the election held on the fourth Saturday in March, though the Governor may dissolve the house sooner on the advice of the Premier.

=== Key dates ===
Key dates for the election were:

- 25 February: Lodgment of nominations opened
- 1 March: Legislative Assembly expired
- 4 March: Issue of Writs
- 6 March: Close of nominations
- 11 March: Early voting began
- 23 March: Election day (polls opened 8am to 6pm)
- 27 March: Last day for receipt of postal votes
- 3 April: Estimated Legislative Assembly declaration of results
- 12 April: Estimated Legislative Council declaration of results

== Newspaper endorsements ==
=== Sunday editions ===
Newspaper	Endorsement
The Sun-Herald	Coalition
Sunday Telegraph	Coalition
The Australian Financial Review	Coalition
The Australian	Coalition
The Sydney Morning Herald	Coalition
The Daily Telegraph	Coalition
Green Left Weekly	Socialist Alliance
Red Flag (newspaper)	Socialist Alliance & Greens

The Sunday newspapers both endorsed the Liberal/National Party Coalition over the Labor Party.

The Sun-Herald described Berejiklian's Coalition Government as "solid and safe custodians, and—despite eight years in power and two relatively orderly leadership transitions—there is no particular sense that the Coalition has worn out its welcome". While highlighting her strengths in infrastructure and economic management, it warned that "the electorate tends to respond to a leader who can articulate a more uplifting vision". It contrasted this against Daley, where "questions linger over whether he and his team are ready to govern, partly because of how recently he was thrust into the job, partly because of past connections to tainted figures in the last Labor government and partly of his own making".

The Sunday Telegraph pointed out that despite having commenced many large scale infrastructure projects "the problem for the Government is that nothing is quite finished yet". Despite this, it singled out the Labor Opposition for not having "done enough to atone for the sins of its recent history" of corruption. It called for stability of leadership after a decade of instability, recommending to voters that they "should give the Government the opportunity to see through the transformation of our state".

=== Weekday editions ===
All four weekday newspapers endorsed the Liberal/National Party Coalition over the Labor Party.

=== Alternative newspapers ===
The Green Left Weekly endorsed Socialist Alliance. The Red Flag (newspaper) endorsed voting for both Socialist Alliance and the Greens.

== See also ==
- Candidates of the 2019 New South Wales state election
- Politics of New South Wales
- Members of the New South Wales Legislative Assembly, 2015–2019
- Members of the New South Wales Legislative Council, 2015–2019
