= Adrian Piccoli =

Australian politician

The Honourable Adrian Piccoli
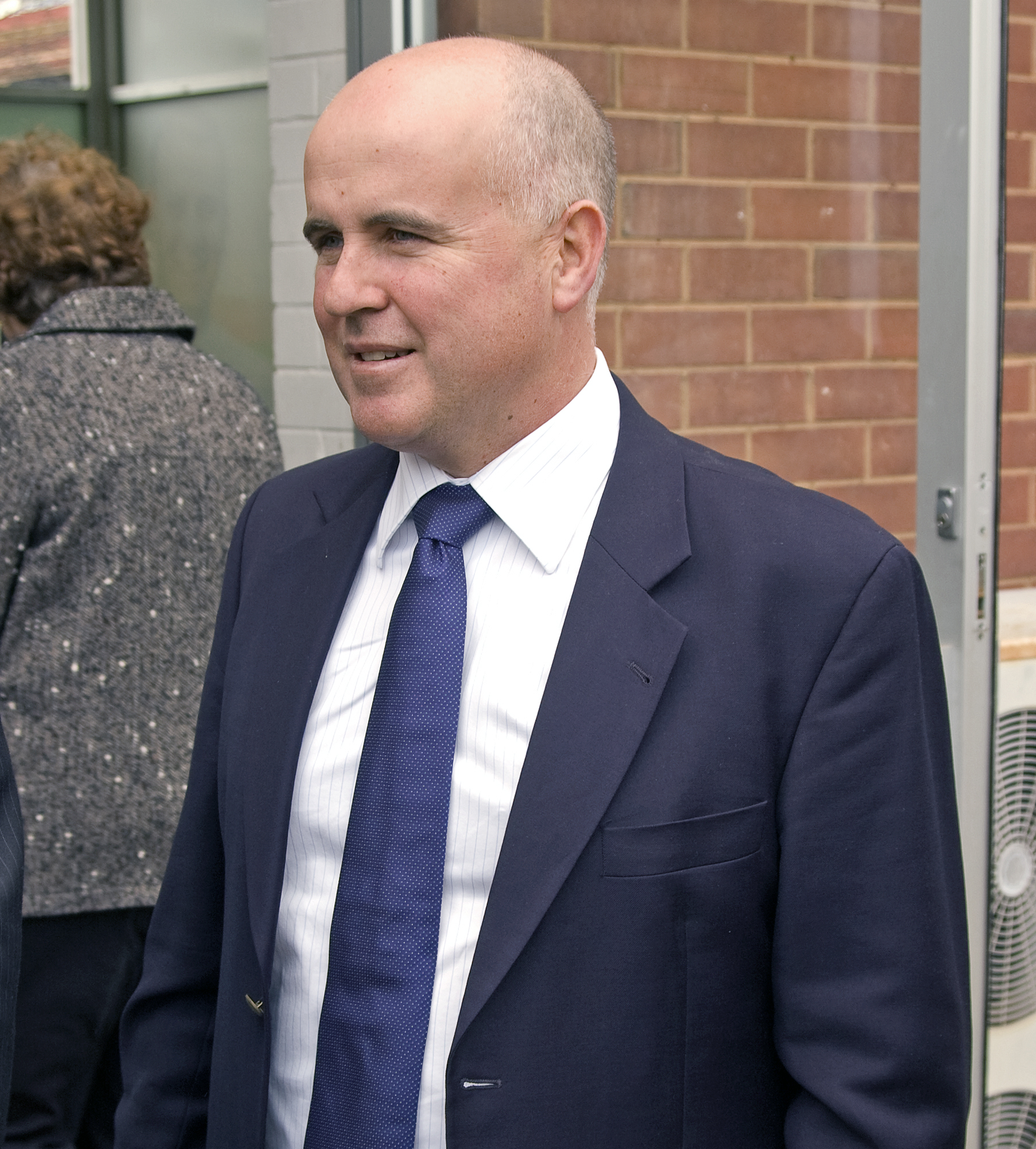

Member of the New South Wales Parliament for Murrumbidgee
- In office 27 March 1999 – 28 March 2015
- Preceded by: Adrian Cruickshank
- Succeeded by: Seat abolished

Member of the New South Wales Parliament for Murray
- In office 28 March 2015 – 15 September 2017
- Preceded by: New seat
- Succeeded by: Austin Evans

Minister for Education
- In office 3 April 2011 – 30 January 2017
- Premier: Barry O'Farrell; Mike Baird; Gladys Berejiklian
- Preceded by: Verity Firth
- Succeeded by: Rob Stokes

Personal details
- Born: 24 March 1970 (age 56) Griffith, New South Wales
- Party: The Nationals
- Children: Two
- Education: Australian National University
- Profession: Solicitor; Farmer

Adrian Piccoli (Italian: [ˈpikkoli]; born 24 March 1970) is a former Australian politician who represented the electoral district of Murray in the New South Wales Legislative Assembly from 2015 to 2017, and the district of Murrumbidgee from 1999 to 2015. He was the deputy leader of the Nationals in the New South Wales Parliament from 2008 to 2016. Piccoli served as the Minister for Education between April 2011 and January 2017, in both the O'Farrell and Baird ministries.

== Personal life ==
Of Italian descent, Piccoli was born in Griffith. He completed a Bachelor of Economics and a Bachelor of Laws at the Australian National University in 1993.

Prior to starting his political career, Piccoli worked as an irrigation rice farmer and solicitor. He is married, has two children, and is a Roman Catholic.

== NSW Minister for Education (2011–2017) ==
Following the election of the O’Farrell Government in 2011, Piccoli was appointed Minister for Education. He retained the role under Premier Mike Baird until January 2017.

As Minister, Piccoli spearheaded major reforms including the Great Teaching, Inspired Learning initiative and was a strong advocate for needs-based funding, aligning New South Wales with the principles of the Gonski reforms. His tenure was frequently described as collaborative and reform-driven, earning respect across party lines and among educators.

Piccoli’s performance received widespread positive recognition:

- Upon his departure in 2017, Deputy Premier John Barilaro said: “Adrian Piccoli's been a fantastic education minister, the best education minister this state has seen and probably this nation.”
- EducationHQ described him as: “Perhaps the most widely respected education minister in our country’s history.”
- The Educator K/12 observed: “The overwhelming response has been positive and rarely has a Minister had such visible support.”

His leadership was also noted by professional organisations and the media as instrumental in embedding equity as a guiding principle of education policy in NSW.

== Role in Gonski school funding reforms ==
As New South Wales Minister for Education (2011–2017), Adrian Piccoli played a pivotal role in securing and implementing the landmark Gonski school funding reforms, which aimed to establish a more equitable, needs-based model of educational funding across Australia.

In April 2013, under his ministerial leadership, New South Wales became the first Australian state to sign onto the National Education Reform Agreement, thereby enacting the Gonski reforms. Piccoli hailed this commitment as evidence of the NSW Government’s prioritisation of education and the principle that every child—regardless of background or location—should receive a fair and needs-based share of resources.

He strongly advocated for the reforms, describing them not just as an educational necessity but as a moral, social, and economic imperative. Piccoli’s support was seen as instrumental in giving the Gonski agenda cross-party credibility, especially given his senior role in a Coalition state government.

The new funding model was applied across NSW schools, with an emphasis on directing additional resources to those in greatest need, particularly in regional, rural, and disadvantaged communities. His leadership earned him widespread acclaim within the education sector, with commentators describing him as one of Australia’s most effective education ministers and a foremost advocate for evidence-based, needs-focused funding reform.

When Deputy Premier and Nationals leader Andrew Stoner announced his resignation in 2014, Piccoli as Stoner's deputy was expected to stand as a candidate to succeed him as Nationals leader but chose not to nominate for the leadership and instead remained deputy to new leader Troy Grant.

In 2016 Grant resigned as Deputy Premier and Nationals leader but Piccoli again did not stand for the leadership and instead stood down as deputy leader.

Piccoli has promoted an educational reform called "Local Schools, Local Decisions" to give state schools more authority.

Following a January 2017 reshuffle of the Berejiklian ministry, Piccoli was not appointed to the new ministry and issued a statement that he had ruled out resigning from politics before the next election.

=== Resignation ===
On 4 September 2017, Piccoli announced he was resigning from parliament to accept a position at the University of New South Wales. He resigned on 15 September, triggering a by-election in his seat of Murray.

== Later career ==
After leaving parliament in 2017, Piccoli became Director of the Gonski Institute for Education at the University of New South Wales, where he continued to advocate for evidence-based policy and fair funding in Australian schools.

During his tenure at UNSW, the Gonski Institute for Education sponsored significant research, particularly focusing on rural, remote and regional education.

He later joined Korn Ferry, a global talent and leadership consulting firm, where he is a Senior Client Partner and Global Account Lead - Education and Government. His professional profile describes him as “highly regarded in the Australian government and education sector for his leadership in education policy and reform delivery.”

In 2020, he appeared on ABC’s Q+A as a panelist, where the broadcaster introduced him as “highly respected by the Australian education sector for his leadership in education policy particularly in relation to needs-based school funding reform.”

== Books ==
Adrian Piccoli has authored two books: "12 Ways Your Child Can Get the Best Out of School" "Power Politics and the Playground: Perspectives on Power and Authority in Education" References:

New South Wales Legislative Assembly
Preceded by Adrian Cruickshank	Member for Murrumbidgee; 1999–2015	District abolished
New district	Member for Murray; 2015–2017	Succeeded by Austin Evans
Political offices
Preceded by Verity Firth as Minister for Education and Training	Minister for Education; 2011–2017	Succeeded by Rob Stokes
Party political offices
Preceded by Andrew Fraser	Deputy Leader of the New South Wales National Party; 2008–2016	Succeeded by Niall Blair
