= 2017 Murray state by-election =

Election result for Murray, New South Wales, Australia

- 14 October 2017

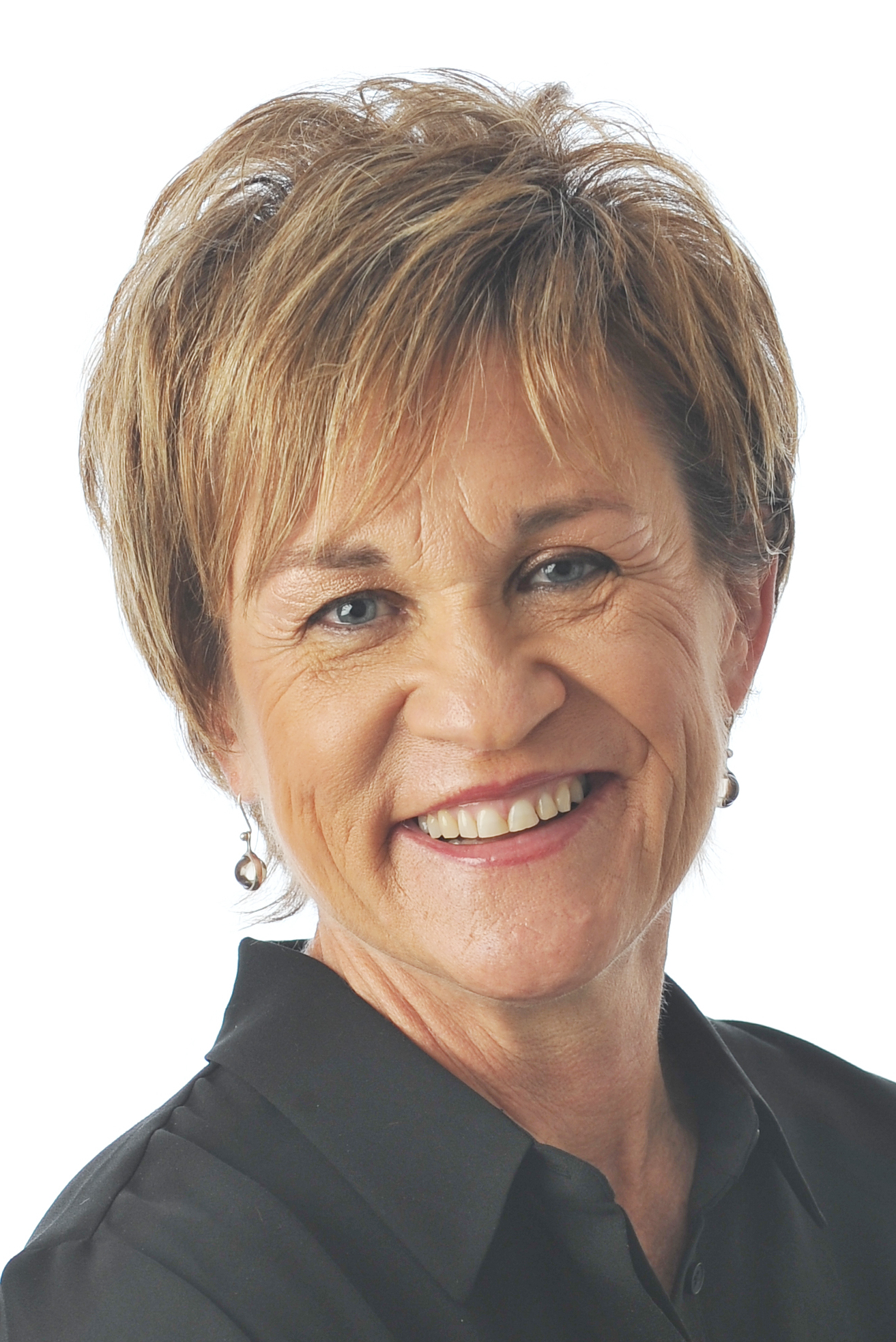

	First party	Second party	Third party
Candidate	Austin Evans	Helen Dalton	Michael Kidd
Party	National	SFF	Labor
Popular vote	18,548	14,332	9,324
Percentage	40.7%	31.5%	20.5%
Swing	▼14.8pp	▲31.5pp	▲4.3pp
TPP	53.3%	46.7%
TPP swing	▼19.3pp	▲46.7pp
MP before election
Adrian Piccoli
National
Elected MP
Austin Evans
National

A by-election was held in the New South Wales state electoral district of Murray on 14 October 2017. The by-election was triggered by the resignation of Adrian Piccoli (National), former deputy leader of the National Party. The National Party barely retained the seat and, after distribution of preferences, Austin Evans was elected. Helen Dalton, candidate for the Shooters, Fishers & Farmers Party seen a swing of more than 13% on her personal vote building on the 2015 result.

The by-election was held on the same day as by-elections in Blacktown and Cootamundra. The conduct of all three by-elections was administered by the NSW Electoral Commission.

== Candidates ==
The candidates in ballot paper order are as follows:

Candidate nominations
Party	Candidate	Notes (not on ballot paper)
Independent	Brian Mills	
Independent	Peter Robinson	
Nationals	Austin Evans	Former Mayor of the abolished Murrumbidgee Shire, former Administrator of Murrumbidgee Council and current councillor on Murrumbidgee Council. Evans is Senior Operations Engineer at Coleambally Irrigation Co-operative Limited.
Shooters, Fishers and Farmers	Helen Dalton	Independent candidate and runner-up for Murray in the 2015 election.
Country Labor	Michael Kidd	Councillor on Leeton Shire. Kidd works as a radiographer for Leeton Health Service and cites cuts by the Murrumbidgee Local Health District as his main campaign issue.
Greens	Ray Goodlass	

== Results ==
2017 Murray by-election Saturday 14 October
Party	Candidate	Votes	%	±%
National	Austin Evans	18,548	40.7	−14.8
Shooters, Fishers, Farmers	Helen Dalton	14,332	31.5	+31.5
Labor	Michael Kidd	9,324	20.5	+4.3
Independent	Brian Mills	1,363	3.0	−0.8
Independent	Peter Robinson	1,072	2.4	+2.4
Greens	Ray Goodlass	912	2.0	−0.2
Total formal votes		45,551	96.9	+0.6
Informal votes		1,466	3.1	−0.6
Turnout		47,017	84.0	−3.5
Two-candidate-preferred result
National	Austin Evans	21,237	53.3	−19.3
Shooters, Fishers, Farmers	Helen Dalton	18,570	46.7	+46.7
National hold		Swing	–19.3	

== See also ==
- Electoral results for the district of Murray
- List of New South Wales state by-elections
