= Great Koala National Park =

Proposed national park in Australia

- Location: North Coast of New South Wales, Australia
- Area: 476,000 ha (1,840 sq mi)
- Created: 23 October 2026
- Owner: NSW Government
- Website: Creating the Great Koala National Park – information and updates

The Great Koala National Park is a national park in the north coast of New South Wales, Australia which aims to create a sanctuary for koalas as they are an endangered native species.

On its proposed boundaries, the national park will be located on the North Coast of New South Wales passing through towns including Kempsey, Nambucca Heads, Coffs Harbour, Woolgoolga and Sawtell. This park will protect 176,000 hectares of state forests and merge existing reserves. The park will be inhabited by koalas and many other threatened species including greater gliders, glossy black cockatoos and many rare plants including species of spider orchid.

The boundaries were added to the government gazette in October 2026. The government is creating this national park in order to fulfil an election commitment made in 2023.

== History ==
The original ideas leading to this proposal were formulated in 2010. A survey was commissioned, due to alarm surrounding declining koala populations. Former national parks officer Ashley Love has been credited by the government and conservation groups with developing early iterations of the proposal. Luke Foley, as shadow environment minister in 2014, came across this proposal, and developed the subsequent policy when he subsequently became Labor leader in 2015. Foley was inspired by the giant panda reserves in China. In January 2015, Foley announced a plan to create a Great Koala National Park and hold a koala summit during that year's unsuccessful state election campaign.

The plan was proposed again in 2019 during that year's state election campaign by the Labor Party under then leader Michael Daley; the proposal did not progress as the party were not elected to government.

The current iteration of the Great Koala National Park was proposed again by the New South Wales Labor Party during the 2023 state election campaign in addition to a koala summit that would formulate a strategy to revitalise the species. The Labor Party was elected to government with Chris Minns as premier and Penny Sharpe as environment minister so planning for the new national park commenced.

The decision to enact this proposal was accelerated due to Essential Energy phasing out the use of wood in its power pole infrastructure.

Planning for the new national park was funded in the 2023 state budget with the state government investing $80 million to kick-start the project. Logging in the proposed area ceased from 8 September following the government's announcement of the park's proposed boundaries.

Upon announcement of the park, $60 million was allocated to the project via the National Parks and Wildlife Service along with $6 million of funding for small businesses and the community in the state's north coast to prepare for the park, the NSW Government also announced a comprehensive support package for workers and the industry that is similar to JobKeeper during the COVID-19 pandemic.

The carbon credit scheme for the national park was approved in June 2026.

In September 2026, Sharpe said that legislation to establish the park would be introduced to Parliament as soon as possible after the Clean Energy Regulator approves the project.

Legislation to create the park was passed by the New South Wales Parliament on 23 October 2026.

== Outcomes ==
In addition to koalas, the areas slated for protection includes ancient Gondwana Rainforests, eucalyptus trees, greater gliders and glossy black cockatoos.

It is estimated that about 12,000 koalas and 36,000 greater gliders will be protected when this area comes under conservation measures. Aboriginal rangers will be employed throughout the national park to protect cultural heritage. The government expects that the new park will generate an extra $163 million for the state's economy through tourism revenue.

== Reactions ==
Criticism was levied at the government as they had committed to the idea yet continued to allow logging in the area that would be used for the national park between the time of the Labor Party's election to government and the announcement of the proposed boundaries. A conservation group estimates that about 10,000 hectares of forest had been cut down during the time between the government was elected and announcement of the proposed boundaries.

Former secretary of the federal department of the treasury and current chair of the Australian Climate and Biodiversity Foundation Ken Henry stated that he thinks the timber industry is unsustainable, praising the jobs that this reserve creates and saying the plan to construct this plan is "credible".

The timber industry has vehemently criticised the proposal, and the Australian Workers' Union has been entirely opposed to the proposal in all of its iterations. Some opposition MPs had reservations but supported the idea in principle, while former National Party leader Dugald Saunders outright rejected the proposal for its effects on the logging industry.

The new carbon credits scheme caused division within the Australian Greens. While leader Larissa Waters supported the proposal, Legislative Council member Sue Higginson described the usage of carbon credits as "deeply offensive". Later, three Greens senators crossed the floor and supported a motion in the federal Senate to disallow the scheme. The disallowance motion was voted down by 34–27 when seven Greens senators, along with the Labor Party, independent senators David Pocock and Lidia Thorpe, Jacqui Lambie and Liberal senator Andrew McLachlan voted against the proposal. Former Greens leader Bob Brown expressed his support for the dissenters, stating that if he was "in the Senate, [he] would have made the same decision".

Organisations such as the World Wildlife Fund (WWF), Outdoors NSW & ACT, the Nature Conservation Council, the North East Forest Alliance and the North Coast Environmental Council have also praised the proposal. The North East Forest Alliance said that the park would be "on par with [Neville] Wran's historic 1982 Rainforest Decision that protected 120,000 ha of forests in north-east NSW and ultimately led to the protection of all rainforests". Victoria Jack of the Wilderness Society said that "conservation wins don't get much bigger than this", however, the Wilderness Society came to oppose the proposal due to the carbon credit scheme.

== See also ==
- Georges River Koala National Park, also proposed at the 2019 and 2023 state elections
- Protected areas of Australia
- Protected areas of New South Wales
