= Georges River Koala National Park =

Protected areas in New South Wales, Australia

- Location: Georges River, south west Sydney, New South Wales, Australia
- Area: 1,830 ha (7.1 sq mi)
- Owner: NSW Government

The Georges River Koala National Park, also known as the Warranmadhaa National Park, is a series of protected areas within the Georges River area in the southwest of Sydney, New South Wales, Australia intended to protect koalas. The state government is in the process of building this national park to fulfill an election pledge made in 2023. Gulguer National Park was created under the same plan and intends to protect Indigenous cultural heritage and will be 1,100 hectares in size; it also seeks to protect more than 28 threatened species.

== History ==
The New South Wales Labor Party previously proposed a similar policy for park creation in November 2018 and took it to the 2019 state election. The national park would have been located within a sliver of bushland named Smiths Creek Reserve in Campbelltown. The party was unsuccessful in implementing the policy as they were not elected to government.

During the 2023 state election campaign, the Labor Party proposed a national park to be located between Glenfield and Appin. They were successful in gaining government under leader Chris Minns, so planning subsequently commenced. The government is investing $48.2 million to implement the policy, which includes additional measures such as a koala care centre, support for volunteers, and investments in protective infrastructure. The state member of parliament for Campbelltown, Greg Warren, has been an advocate for the proposal.

Action was taken to implement the policy through the Cumberland Plain Conservation Plan in 2023, which will also enable the construction of up to 73,000 new homes.

In July 2026, environment minister Penny Sharpe announced a new national park to be named Gulguer National Park, which would form part of the Cumberland Plain Conservation Plan. Gulguer National Park will be formed from two existing conservation areas along with 700 hectares of land acquired from old farming and rural residential development.

== Name ==
The official name for the park, Warranmadhaa, is an Aboriginal word which was chosen during the government's consultation with the local Tharawal Aboriginal land council, traditional custodians, and other members of the local Aboriginal community. It describes the southern part of the park's landscape.

The Gulguer National Park is named after the Gundungurra word that describes the whirlpool action of the water that forms during high flows of the Nepean River.

== Location ==
The national park will be located between Long Point in Campbelltown and Appin within the Wollondilly Shire local government area. Ousedale Creek will provide east-west connectivity. As part of the Cumberland Plain Conservation Plan, the northern Noorumba and Beulah corridors may also be utilised, though these areas will require significant revegetation.

As of 30 July 2025, the government has acquired land for the national park that is 962 hectares in size. Environment minister Penny Sharpe has stated that the national park will eventually be expanded by 830 hectares. These areas contain the only chlamydia-free koala populations in the state.

Gulguer National Park will be located to the west of Bringelly.

== Responses ==
Environmentalists have praised the developments regarding this national park but have also expressed caution over the government's plans where the habitat was not satisfactory. An environmental group also raised concerns over the growing number of koalas killed while crossing roads.

Environmental groups are concerned by an area near the national park being fast-tracked for a large amount of housing developments which is located near vulnerable habitat.

== See also ==
- Great Koala National Park, also proposed at the 2019 and 2023 state elections
- Protected areas of Australia
- Protected areas of New South Wales
