= Austin Evans =

Australian politician

Member of the New South Wales Parliament for Murray
- In office 14 October 2017 – 23 March 2019
- Preceded by: Adrian Piccoli
- Succeeded by: Helen Dalton

Mayor of Murrumbidgee Shire
- In office 2014 – 12 May 2016
- Preceded by: Phillip Wells
- Succeeded by: Shire abolished

Personal details
- Born: Austin William Evans; 3 June 1968 (age 57)
- Party: National Party

Austin William Evans (born 3 June 1968) is an Australian politician. He was a Nationals member of the New South Wales Legislative Assembly from 14 October 2017 to 23 March 2019, representing Murray after a by-election held to replace Adrian Piccoli.

Evans grew up in Narrandera and worked for an irrigation company in Coleambally. He was the last mayor of Murrumbidgee Shire before its amalgamation with Jerilderie Shire, and served as administrator of the resulting Murrumbidgee Council from 2016 to 2017. He was elected to the new council in 2017.

New South Wales Legislative Assembly
Preceded by Adrian Piccoli	Member for Murray; 2017–2019	Succeeded by Helen Dalton
