= Helen Dalton =

Australian politician

Helen Dalton MP
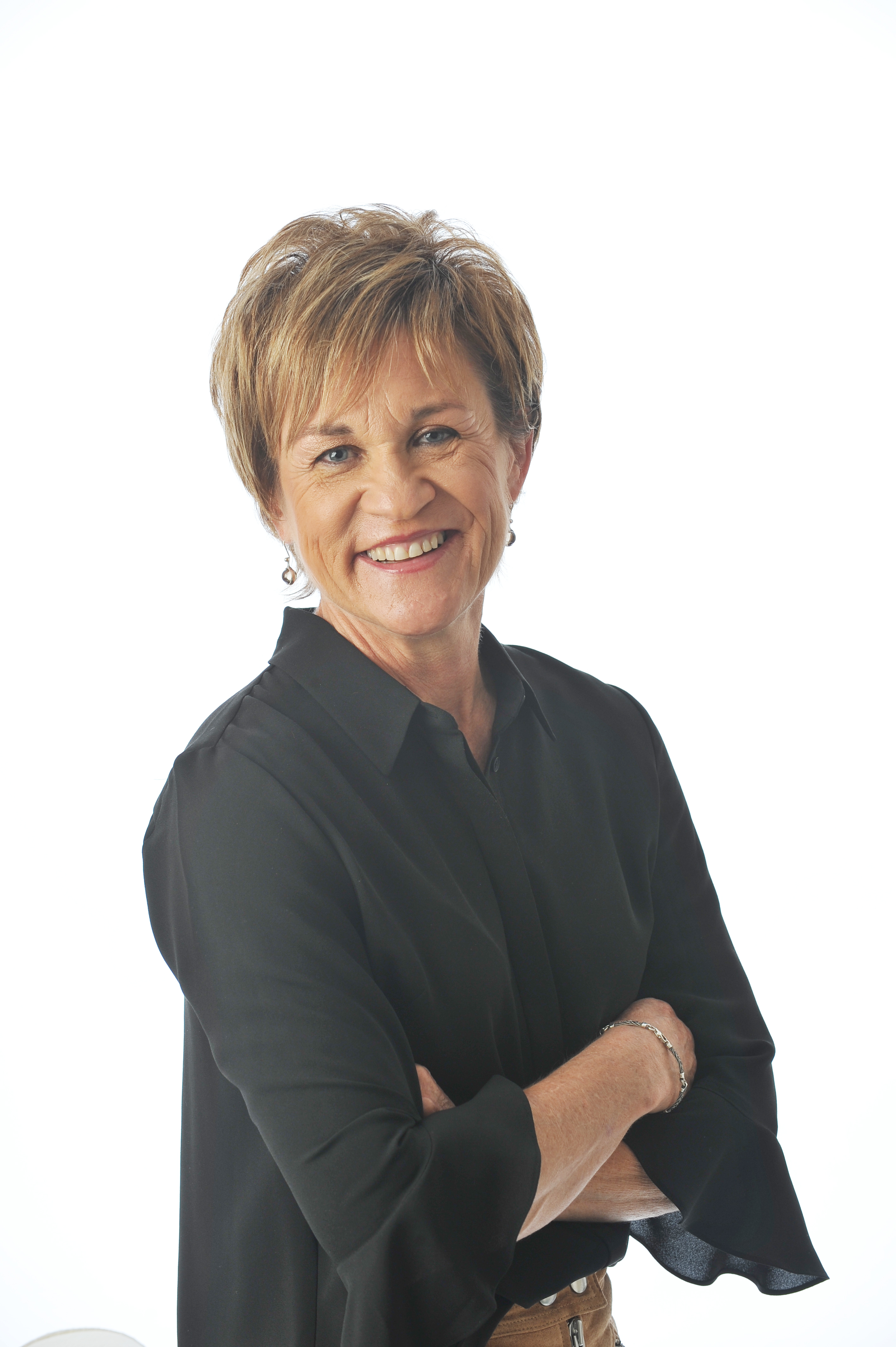
- Dalton in 2019

Member of the New South Wales Parliament for Murray
- Incumbent
- Assumed office 23 March 2019
- Preceded by: Austin Evans

Personal details
- Party: Independent (2016–2017, 2022–present)
- Other political affiliations: Nationals (2014); Country (2015–2016); Shooters, Fishers and Farmers (2017–2022)
- Occupation: Politician
- Website: https://helendalton.com.au/

Helen Jennifer Dalton is an Australian politician. She has been a member of the New South Wales Legislative Assembly since March 2019, representing the electoral district of Murray, first as a member of the Shooters, Fishers and Farmers Party and since 2022 as an independent.

Since her election Dalton has been a vocal critic of NSW government corruption, water mismanagement, and the under-funding of rural hospitals, mental health services, and infrastructure.

Dalton has campaigned for the establishment of a public register listing all water owners in NSW. She has reported a number of matters to the Independent Commission Against Corruption, including a land sale by Murray River Council and the NSW Government's failure to release a report on re-opening the Narrandera to Tocumwal rail line.

== Early life and career ==
Dalton was born in 1959 and raised on a sheep and wheat farm north of Rankins Springs in the Melbergen District.

Dalton studied education and worked as a primary school teacher from 1981 to 1987. She owns a family farming business that produces maize, rice, cereals, cotton, beef cattle, wool and fat lambs. In 2007, she was awarded a Nuffield Australia Farming Scholarship.

== Political career ==
Dalton ran for parliament unsuccessfully in 2015 and 2017 as an independent with the support of the Country Party of Australia and for the Shooters, Fishers and Farmers Party, respectively. In March 2019, Dalton won the seat of Murray by a 26.2-point swing, breaking 35 years of National Party incumbency. Bookmakers had her as a 9 to 1 outsider just two months before the election.

In her campaign Dalton presented a plan to address water mismanagement and corruption, argued for a royal commission into the Murray Darling Basin Plan, and pushed for better rural health and hospital services.

She has continued to raise these themes as a state MP. Her maiden speech in NSW parliament highlighted the rapid decline in service provision and living standards across rural NSW.

Dalton has written a bill to improve transparency on who owns water in NSW The Bill would have forced all state MPs to declare their water interests, and provided for a public water register allowing the public to search for the names of companies and individuals who own water. The legislation passed the NSW Upper House, but was opposed by the NSW Government, who voted it down in the lower house.

She has frequently clashed with government MPs in state parliament, notably former Health Minister Brad Hazzard and Water Minister Melinda Pavey, who has labelled Dalton a "disgrace". Former Deputy Premier John Barilaro called her a "disgusting human" on Twitter.

A parliamentary speech Dalton gave on the destruction of family farms across Australia has been viewed more than 330,000 times. She has also criticised excessive foreign ownership of Australian water and farmland, and campaigned for mental health services in the bush.

On 3 March 2022, Dalton resigned from the Shooters Fishers and Farmers after disagreeing with the party's Legislative Council members' failure to show up to vote against a bill regarding water usage that she believed would "disadvantage communities and irrigators in the lower Darling and Murray river system".

In February 2026, Dalton was viewed as a potential candidate for the 2026 Farrer by-election, with Dalton claiming that her mobile phone "has been burning up" since the resignation of Sussan Ley.

== Personal life ==
Dalton married in 1984 and has four adult children and three grandchildren.

New South Wales Legislative Assembly
Preceded by Austin Evans	Member for Murray; 2019–present	Incumbent
