= Members of the New South Wales Legislative Assembly, 2015–2019 =

Members of the New South Wales Legislative Assembly who served in the 56th Parliament held their seats from 2015 to 2019. They were as elected at the 2015 state election and at by-elections. The Speaker was Shelley Hancock.

Name	Party	Electorate	Term in office
Jenny Aitchison	Labor	Maitland	2015–present
Kevin Anderson	National	Tamworth	2011–present
Greg Aplin	Liberal	Albury	2003–2019
Edmond Atalla	Labor	Mount Druitt	2015–present
Stuart Ayres	Liberal	Penrith	2010–present
Mike Baird (Note: On 23 January 2017, the Premier and Liberal member for Manly, Mike Baird, resigned. Liberal candidate James Griffin was elected to replace him at a by-election held on 8 April 2017.)	Liberal	Manly	2007–2017
Stephen Bali (Note: On 25 August 2017, the Labor member for Blacktown, John Robertson, resigned. Labor candidate Stephen Bali was elected to replace him at a by-election held on 14 October 2017.)	Labor	Blacktown	2017–present
John Barilaro	National	Monaro	2011–2021
Clayton Barr	Labor	Cessnock	2011–present
Gladys Berejiklian	Liberal	Willoughby	2003–2021
Stephen Bromhead	National	Myall Lakes	2011–present
Glenn Brookes (Note: On 21 March 2016, the member for East Hills, Glenn Brookes, resigned from the Liberal Party to sit as an independent on the crossbench. He rejoined the Liberal Party in 2017.)	Liberal/Independent/Liberal	East Hills	2011–2019
Linda Burney (Note: On 6 May 2016, the Labor member for Canterbury, Linda Burney, resigned to contest the federal seat of Barton. Former Labor MLC Sophie Cotsis was elected to replace her at the by-election on 12 November 2016.)	Labor	Canterbury	2003–2016
Prue Car	Labor	Londonderry	2015–present
Yasmin Catley	Labor	Swansea	2015–present
Anoulack Chanthivong	Labor	Macquarie Fields	2015–present
Kevin Conolly	Liberal	Riverstone	2011–present
Andrew Constance	Liberal	Bega	2003–2021
Steph Cooke (Note: On 1 September 2017, the Nationals member for Cootamundra, Katrina Hodgkinson, resigned. Nationals candidate Steph Cooke was elected to replace him at a by-election held on 14 October 2017.)	National	Cootamundra	2017–present
Sophie Cotsis	Labor	Canterbury	2016–present
Mark Coure	Liberal	Oatley	2011–present
Tim Crakanthorp	Labor	Newcastle	2014–present
Adam Crouch	Liberal	Terrigal	2015–present
Michael Daley	Labor	Maroubra	2005–present
Tanya Davies	Liberal	Mulgoa	2011–present
Jihad Dib	Labor	Lakemba	2015–present
Victor Dominello	Liberal	Ryde	2008–present
Philip Donato (Note: On 30 May 2016, the Nationals member for Orange, Andrew Gee, resigned to contest the federal seat of Calare. Philip Donato of the Shooters, Fishers and Farmers Party won the by-election held on 12 November 2016.)	Shooters, Fishers, Farmers	Orange	2016–present
Trish Doyle	Labor	Blue Mountains	2015–present
David Elliott	Liberal	Baulkham Hills	2011–present
Austin Evans (Note: On 15 September 2017, the Nationals member for Murray, Adrian Piccoli, resigned. Nationals candidate Austin Evans was elected to replace him at a by-election held on 14 October 2017.)	National	Murray	2017–2019
Lee Evans	Liberal	Heathcote	2011–present
Julia Finn	Labor	Granville	2015–present
Luke Foley	Labor	Auburn	2015–2019
Andrew Fraser	National	Coffs Harbour	1990–2019
Andrew Gee	National	Orange	2011–2016
Thomas George	National	Lismore	1999–2019
Melanie Gibbons	Liberal	Holsworthy	2011–present
Pru Goward	Liberal	Goulburn	2007–2019
Troy Grant	National	Dubbo	2011–2019
Alex Greenwich	Independent	Sydney	2012–present
James Griffin	Liberal	Manly	2017–present
Chris Gulaptis	National	Clarence	2011–present
Shelley Hancock	Liberal	South Coast	2003–present
David Harris	Labor	Wyong	2007–2011, 2015–present
Jodie Harrison	Labor	Charlestown	2014–present
Noreen Hay (Note: On 31 August 2016, the Labor member for Wollongong, Noreen Hay, resigned. Labor candidate Paul Scully was elected to replace her at a by-election held on 12 November 2016.)	Labor	Wollongong	2003–2016
Jo Haylen	Labor	Summer Hill	2015–present
Brad Hazzard	Liberal	Wakehurst	1991–present
Alister Henskens	Liberal	Ku-ring-gai	2015–present
Katrina Hodgkinson	National	Cootamundra	1999–2017
Ron Hoenig	Labor	Heffron	2012–present
Sonia Hornery	Labor	Wallsend	2007–present
Kevin Humphries	National	Barwon	2007–2019
Michael Johnsen	National	Upper Hunter	2015–2021
Steve Kamper	Labor	Rockdale	2015–present
Matt Kean	Liberal	Hornsby	2011–present
Nick Lalich	Labor	Cabramatta	2008–present
Geoff Lee	Liberal	Parramatta	2011–present
Jenny Leong	Greens	Newtown	2015–present
Paul Lynch	Labor	Liverpool	1995–present
Daryl Maguire (Note: On 13 July 2018, the member for Wagga Wagga, Daryl Maguire, resigned from the Liberal Party following an inquiry by the Independent Commission Against Corruption (ICAC). He resigned from parliament on 3 August 2018. Independent candidate Joe McGirr was elected to replace him at a by-election held on 8 September 2018.)	Liberal/Independent	Wagga Wagga	1999–2018
Adam Marshall	National	Northern Tablelands	2013–present
Hugh McDermott	Labor	Prospect	2015–present
Joe McGirr	Independent	Wagga Wagga	2018–present
Jodi McKay	Labor	Strathfield	2007–2011, 2015–2021
David Mehan	Labor	The Entrance	2015–present
Tania Mihailuk	Labor	Bankstown	2011–present
Chris Minns	Labor	Kogarah	2015–present
Bruce Notley-Smith	Liberal	Coogee	2011–2019
Jonathan O'Dea	Liberal	Davidson	2007–present
Ryan Park	Labor	Keira	2011–present
Jamie Parker	Greens	Balmain	2011–present
Chris Patterson	Liberal	Camden	2011–2019
Melinda Pavey	National	Oxley	2015–present
Dominic Perrottet	Liberal	Hawkesbury	2011–present
Eleni Petinos	Liberal	Miranda	2015–present
Adrian Piccoli	National	Murray	1999–2017
Greg Piper	Independent	Lake Macquarie	2007–present
Geoff Provest	National	Tweed	2007–present
Anthony Roberts	Liberal	Lane Cove	2003–present
John Robertson	Labor	Blacktown	2011–2017
Jai Rowell (Note: On 17 December 2018, the member for Wollondilly, Jai Rowell, resigned. No by-election was held)	Liberal	Wollondilly	2011–2018
Paul Scully	Labor	Wollongong	2016–present
John Sidoti	Liberal	Drummoyne	2011–present
Jillian Skinner (Note: On 20 February 2017, the Liberal member for North Shore, Jillian Skinner, resigned. Liberal candidate Felicity Wilson was elected to replace her at a by-election held on 8 April 2017.)	Liberal	North Shore	1994–2017
Kathy Smith (Note: On 14 February 2017, the Labor member for Gosford, Kathy Smith, resigned due to ill health. Labor candidate Liesl Tesch was elected to replace her at a by-election held on 8 April 2017.)	Labor	Gosford	2015–2017
Tamara Smith	Greens	Ballina	2015–present
Mark Speakman	Liberal	Cronulla	2011–present
Rob Stokes	Liberal	Pittwater	2007–present
Mark Taylor	Liberal	Seven Hills	2015–present
Liesl Tesch	Labor	Gosford	2017–present
Paul Toole	National	Bathurst	2011–present
Damien Tudehope	Liberal	Epping	2015–2019
Gabrielle Upton	Liberal	Vaucluse	2011–present
Gareth Ward	Liberal	Kiama	2011–present
Greg Warren	Labor	Campbelltown	2015–present
Kate Washington	Labor	Port Stephens	2015–present
Anna Watson	Labor	Shellharbour	2011–present
Leslie Williams	National	Port Macquarie	2011–2025
Ray Williams	Liberal	Castle Hill	2007–present
Felicity Wilson	Liberal	North Shore	2017–present
Guy Zangari	Labor	Fairfield	2011–present

== See also ==
- Second Baird ministry
- First Berejiklian ministry
- Results of the 2015 New South Wales state election (Legislative Assembly)
- Candidates of the 2015 New South Wales state election
