= Electoral results for the district of Wollongong =

Election results for Wollongong, New South Wales, Australia

Wollongong, an electoral district of the Legislative Assembly in the Australian state of New South Wales, has had three incarnations, the first from 1904 to 1920, the second from 1927 to 1930, and the third from 1968 to the present.

== Members ==
First incarnation (1904–1920)
Election	Member	Party
1904	John Nicholson	Labour
1907	John Nicholson	Labour
1910	John Nicholson	Labour
1913	John Nicholson	Labour
1917	Billy Davies	Labour
Second incarnation (1927–1930)
Election	Member	Party
1927	Billy Davies	Labor
Third incarnation (1968–present)
Election	Member	Party
1968	Jack Hough	Liberal
1971	Eric Ramsay	Labor
1973	Eric Ramsay	Labor
1976	Eric Ramsay	Labor
1978	Eric Ramsay	Labor
1981	Eric Ramsay	Labor
1984	Frank Arkell	Independent
1988	Frank Arkell	Independent
1991	Gerry Sullivan	Labor
1995	Gerry Sullivan	Labor
1999	Col Markham	Labor
2003	Noreen Hay	Labor
2007	Noreen Hay	Labor
2011	Noreen Hay	Labor
2015	Noreen Hay	Labor
2016 by	Paul Scully	Labor
2019	Paul Scully	Labor
2023	Paul Scully	Labor

== Election results ==
=== Elections in the 2020s ===
==== 2023 ====
2023 New South Wales state election: Wollongong
Party	Candidate	Votes	%	±%
Labor	Paul Scully	27,723	56.5	+4.9
Liberal	Joel Johnson	10,776	22.0	+0.8
Greens	Cath Blakey	8,216	16.7	+3.4
Animal Justice	Kristen Nelson	2,347	4.8	+2.3
Total formal votes		49,062	96.1	+0.5
Informal votes		2,011	3.9	−0.5
Turnout		51,073	86.8	−1.6
Two-party-preferred result
Labor	Paul Scully	33,962	74.3	+1.5
Liberal	Joel Johnson	11,727	25.7	−1.5
Labor hold		Swing	+1.5	

=== Elections in the 2010s ===
==== 2019 ====
2019 New South Wales state election: Wollongong
Party	Candidate	Votes	%	±%
Labor	Paul Scully	25,776	50.11	+9.74
Liberal	Zachary Fitzpatrick	11,427	22.22	+1.17
Greens	Benjamin Arcioni	6,583	12.80	+3.25
Independent	Nikola Nastoski	2,830	5.50	+5.50
Sustainable Australia	Andrew Anthony	2,242	4.36	+4.36
Animal Justice	Benjamin Bank	1,541	3.00	+3.00
Keep Sydney Open	James Hehir	1,036	2.01	+2.01
Total formal votes		51,435	95.54	−0.36
Informal votes		2,400	4.46	+0.36
Turnout		53,835	88.50	−0.59
Two-party-preferred result
Labor	Paul Scully	31,357	71.37	+7.93
Liberal	Zachary Fitzpatrick	12,580	28.63	−7.93
Labor hold		Swing	+7.93	

==== 2016 by-election ====
2016 Wollongong by-election Saturday 12 November
Party	Candidate	Votes	%	±%
Labor	Paul Scully	23,588	48.1	+7.7
Independent	Gordon Bradbery	16,707	34.0	+34.0
Greens	Cath Blakey	5,216	10.6	+1.1
Shooters, Fishers, Farmers	Joe Rossi	1,793	3.7	+3.7
Christian Democrats	Colleen Baxter	1,769	3.6	+0.7
Total formal votes		49,073	96.8	+0.9
Informal votes		1,605	3.2	−0.9
Turnout		50,678	93.6	+4.5
Two-candidate-preferred result
Labor	Paul Scully	26,739	58.0	−0.9
Independent	Gordon Bradbery	19,336	42.0	+42.0
Labor hold		Swing	N/A	

Noreen Hay (Labor) resigned.

==== 2015 ====
2015 New South Wales state election: Wollongong
Party	Candidate	Votes	%	±%
Labor	Noreen Hay	20,071	40.4	+3.6
Liberal	Cameron Walters	10,465	21.0	−0.1
Independent	Arthur Rorris	10,162	20.4	+20.4
Greens	Mitchell Bresser	4,747	9.5	−0.2
No Land Tax	Noreen Colonelli	2,197	4.4	+4.4
Christian Democrats	Clarrie Pratt	1,463	2.9	+0.4
Cyclists	Phil Latz	613	1.2	+1.2
Total formal votes		49,718	95.9	+0.2
Informal votes		2,123	4.1	−0.2
Turnout		51,841	89.1	−1.9
Notional two-party-preferred count
Labor	Noreen Hay	24,326	63.4	+4.2
Liberal	Cameron Walters	14,019	36.6	−4.2
Two-candidate-preferred result
Labor	Noreen Hay	22,293	58.9	+4.3
Independent	Arthur Rorris	15,556	41.1	+41.1
Labor hold		Swing	+4.3	

==== 2011 ====
2011 New South Wales state election: Wollongong
Party	Candidate	Votes	%	±%
Labor	Noreen Hay	16,060	35.6	−22.7
Independent	Gordon Bradbery	13,299	29.5	+29.5
Liberal	Michelle Blicavs	9,124	20.2	+3.5
Greens	Brendan Cook	4,315	9.6	−0.2
Independent	Jim Clabour	1,143	2.5	+2.5
Christian Democrats	Clarrie Pratt	1,127	2.5	−3.1
Total formal votes		45,068	96.3	0.0
Informal votes		1,752	3.7	0.0
Turnout		46,820	92.7	
Notional two-party-preferred count
Labor	Noreen Hay	19,656	58.9	−16.4
Liberal	Michelle Blicavs	13,717	41.1	+16.4
Two-candidate-preferred result
Labor	Noreen Hay	18,085	50.9	−24.3
Independent	Gordon Bradbery	17,411	49.1	+49.1
Labor hold		Swing	−24.3	

=== Elections in the 2000s ===
==== 2007 ====
2007 New South Wales state election: Wollongong
Party	Candidate	Votes	%	±%
Labor	Noreen Hay	25,393	58.4	+9.5
Liberal	Colin Fowler	7,306	16.8	+6.5
Greens	Trevor Jones	4,263	9.8	−2.0
Christian Democrats	Clarrie Pratt	2,456	5.6	+2.2
Independent	Lenny Fares	1,983	4.6	+4.6
AAFI	Michael Chehoff	812	1.9	+0.0
Democrats	Madeleine Roberts	703	1.6	+1.6
Socialist Alliance	Jess Moore	591	1.4	+1.4
Total formal votes		43,507	96.2	+0.2
Informal votes		1,710	3.8	−0.2
Turnout		45,217	92.8	
Two-party-preferred result
Labor	Noreen Hay	27,882	75.3	−1.6
Liberal	Colin Fowler	9,154	24.7	+1.6
Labor hold		Swing	−1.6	

==== 2003 ====
2003 New South Wales state election: Wollongong
Party	Candidate	Votes	%	±%
Labor	Noreen Hay	18,388	47.8	−14.9
Independent	Anne Wood	5,609	14.6	+14.6
Independent	David Moulds	4,578	11.9	+11.9
Greens	Meredith Henderson	4,319	11.2	+4.7
Liberal	George Pride	3,518	9.2	−6.4
Christian Democrats	Phil Latz	1,024	2.7	−0.9
AAFI	David Hughes	796	2.1	−1.1
Unity	Van Mach	198	0.5	−1.2
Total formal votes		38,430	96.0	−0.7
Informal votes		1,607	4.0	+0.7
Turnout		40,037	92.4	
Notional two-party-preferred count
Labor	Noreen Hay	24,367	77.7	−1.0
Liberal	George Pride	6,984	22.3	+1.0
Two-candidate-preferred result
Labor	Noreen Hay	20,913	67.3	−11.4
Independent	Anne Wood	10,170	32.7	+32.7
Labor hold		Swing	−11.4	

=== Elections in the 1990s ===
==== 1999 ====
1999 New South Wales state election: Wollongong
Party	Candidate	Votes	%	±%
Labor	Col Markham	24,713	62.7	+3.4
Liberal	Wade McInerney	6,153	15.6	−8.7
Greens	Garth Dickenson	2,557	6.5	−3.4
Democrats	Ken Russell	2,185	5.5	+4.5
Christian Democrats	Phil Latz	1,419	3.6	+0.7
AAFI	John James	1,274	3.2	+3.2
Unity	Kit Yue	652	1.7	+1.7
Democratic Socialist	Angela Luvera	470	1.2	−0.3
Total formal votes		39,423	96.6	+4.3
Informal votes		1,368	3.4	−4.3
Turnout		40,791	93.8	
Two-party-preferred result
Labor	Col Markham	26,996	78.7	+8.3
Liberal	Wade McInerney	7,315	21.3	−8.3
Labor hold		Swing	+8.3	

==== 1995 ====
1995 New South Wales state election: Wollongong
Party	Candidate	Votes	%	±%
Labor	Gerry Sullivan	18,610	58.9	+8.7
Liberal	Warren Steel	7,662	24.3	+13.7
Greens	Will Douglas	3,607	11.4	+6.1
Call to Australia	Valdis Smidlers	758	2.4	+1.1
Democratic Socialist	Chris Pickering	561	1.8	+1.8
Socialist Labour	Dragan Grijak	383	1.2	+1.2
Total formal votes		31,591	92.1	+4.5
Informal votes		2,710	7.9	−4.5
Turnout		34,291	93.1	
Two-party-preferred result
Labor	Gerry Sullivan	20,823	70.1	+11.5
Liberal	Warren Steel	8,887	29.9	+29.9
Labor hold		Swing	+11.5	

==== 1991 ====
1991 New South Wales state election: Wollongong
Party	Candidate	Votes	%	±%
Labor	Gerry Sullivan	15,196	50.2	+11.4
Independent	Frank Arkell	8,971	29.7	−10.0
Liberal	Mick Lucke	3,180	10.5	−1.7
Greens	Steve Brigham	1,600	5.3	+5.3
Democrats	April Sampson-Kelly	894	3.0	+3.0
Call to Australia	Valdis Smidlers	402	1.3	+1.3
Total formal votes		30,243	87.6	−7.8
Informal votes		4,288	12.4	+7.8
Turnout		34,531	93.3	
Two-candidate-preferred result
Labor	Gerry Sullivan	16,125	58.6	+12.2
Independent	Frank Arkell	11,390	41.4	−12.2
Labor gain from Independent		Swing	+12.2	

=== Elections in the 1980s ===
==== 1988 ====
1988 New South Wales state election: Wollongong
Party	Candidate	Votes	%	±%
Independent	Frank Arkell	12,909	44.5	+10.8
Labor	Laurie Kelly	11,263	38.8	−13.1
Liberal	John Masters	2,804	9.7	−1.3
Illawarra Workers	Graham Roberts	2,028	7.0	+7.0
Total formal votes		29,004	95.5	−0.2
Informal votes		1,372	4.5	+0.2
Turnout		30,376	93.2	
Two-candidate-preferred result
Independent	Frank Arkell	15,560	55.5	+10.2
Labor	Laurie Kelly	12,488	44.5	−10.2
Independent hold		Swing	+10.2	

==== 1984 ====
1984 New South Wales state election: Wollongong
Party	Candidate	Votes	%	±%
Independent	Frank Arkell	13,429	44.7	+3.3
Labor	Rex Connor	13,057	43.5	−3.0
Liberal	Ronald Brooks	2,809	9.4	+1.2
Independent	Phillip Xenos	325	1.1	+1.1
Independent	Rudolph Dezelin	213	0.7	+0.7
Independent	Julius Kudrynski	177	0.6	+0.6
Total formal votes		30,010	96.3	+0.3
Informal votes		1,136	3.7	−0.3
Turnout		31,146	93.3	+1.4
Two-candidate-preferred result
Independent	Frank Arkell	15,959	54.2	+4.3
Labor	Rex Connor	13,508	45.8	−4.3
Independent gain from Labor		Swing	+4.3	

==== 1981 ====
1981 New South Wales state election: Wollongong
Party	Candidate	Votes	%	±%
Labor	Eric Ramsay	13,223	46.5	−22.9
Independent	Frank Arkell	11,767	41.4	+41.4
Liberal	Ronald Brooks	2,346	8.2	−13.0
Democrats	Megan Sampson	974	3.4	−3.9
Independent	Ellen Love	142	0.5	+0.5
Total formal votes		28,452	96.0	
Informal votes		1,185	4.0	
Turnout		29,637	91.9	
Two-candidate-preferred result
Labor	Eric Ramsay	14,034	50.1	−23.7
Independent	Frank Arkell	13,983	49.9	+49.9
Labor hold		Swing	−23.7	

=== Elections in the 1970s ===
==== 1978 ====
1978 New South Wales state election: Wollongong
Party	Candidate	Votes	%	±%
Labor	Eric Ramsay	19,733	69.4	+3.4
Liberal	Ronald Brooks	6,026	21.2	−12.8
Democrats	Ross Sampson	2,072	7.3	+7.3
Socialist Workers	Andrew Jamieson	617	2.2	+2.2
Total formal votes		28,448	96.4	−0.6
Informal votes		1,046	3.6	+0.6
Turnout		29,494	93.2	+0.2
Two-party-preferred result
Labor	Eric Ramsay	21,008	73.8	+7.8
Liberal	Ronald Brooks	7,440	26.2	−7.8
Labor hold		Swing	+7.8	

==== 1976 ====
1976 New South Wales state election: Wollongong
Party	Candidate	Votes	%	±%
Labor	Eric Ramsay	18,367	66.0	+4.2
Liberal	Ian Brown	9,461	34.0	−0.9
Total formal votes		27,828	97.0	+0.8
Informal votes		867	3.0	−0.8
Turnout		28,695	93.0	+0.4
Labor hold		Swing	+3.6	

==== 1973 ====
1973 New South Wales state election: Wollongong
Party	Candidate	Votes	%	±%
Labor	Eric Ramsay	17,022	61.8	
Liberal	Ian Brown	9,613	34.9	
Democratic Labor	Raymond Proust	924	3.4	
Total formal votes		27,559	96.2	
Informal votes		1,090	3.8	
Turnout		28,649	92.6	
Two-party-preferred result
Labor	Eric Ramsay	17,207	62.4	+3.6
Liberal	Ian Brown	10,352	37.6	−3.6
Labor hold		Swing	+3.6	

==== 1971 ====
1971 New South Wales state election: Wollongong
Party	Candidate	Votes	%	±%
Labor	Eric Ramsay	13,347	48.9	
Liberal	Jack Hough	11,621	42.5	
Democratic Labor	Peter Daly	2,351	8.6	
Total formal votes		27,319	97.3	
Informal votes		748	2.7	
Turnout		28,067	94.6	
Two-party-preferred result
Labor	Eric Ramsay	13,699	50.1	+0.6
Liberal	Jack Hough	13,620	49.9	−0.6
Labor gain from Liberal		Swing	+0.6	

=== Elections in the 1960s ===
==== 1968 ====
1968 New South Wales state election: Wollongong
Party	Candidate	Votes	%	±%
Liberal	Jack Hough	8,694	42.7	
Labor	Eric Ramsay	7,977	39.2	
Independent	Anthony Bevan	3,345	16.4	
Independent	Walter Green	348	1.7	
Total formal votes		20,364	97.9	
Informal votes		446	2.1	
Turnout		20,810	94.8	
Two-party-preferred result
Liberal	Jack Hough	11,565	56.8	+1.1
Labor	Eric Ramsay	8,799	43.2	−1.1
Liberal win		(new seat)		

District re-created

==== 1927–1968 ====
District abolished District abolished

=== Elections in the 1920s ===
==== 1927 ====
1927 New South Wales state election: Wollongong
Party	Candidate	Votes	%	±%
Labor	Billy Davies	8,863	62.7	
Nationalist	Norman Smith	5,263	37.3	
Total formal votes		14,126	99.4	
Informal votes		84	0.6	
Turnout		14,210	89.3	
Labor win		(new seat)		

District re-created

==== 1920–1927 ====
District abolished District abolished

=== Elections in the 1910s ===
==== 1917 ====
1917 New South Wales state election: Wollongong
Party	Candidate	Votes	%	±%
Labor	Billy Davies	4,857	55.3	−16.3
Nationalist	John Nicholson	3,809	43.4	+19.8
Ind. Socialist Labor	Joseph Charlton	113	1.3	+1.3
Total formal votes		8,779	98.7	+1.7
Informal votes		118	1.3	−1.7
Turnout		8,897	63.0	+2.4
Labor hold		Swing	−16.3	

The sitting member John Nicholson was expelled from Labor in the November 1916 Labor split over conscription.

==== 1913 ====
1913 New South Wales state election: Wollongong
Party	Candidate	Votes	%	±%
Labor	John Nicholson	5,212	71.6	
Liberal Reform	Florence Healey	1,715	23.6	
Socialist Labor	Ernie Judd	351	4.8	
Total formal votes		7,278	97.0	
Informal votes		228	3.0	
Turnout		7,506	60.6	
Labor hold				

==== 1910 ====
1910 New South Wales state election: Wollongong
Party	Candidate	Votes	%	±%
Labour	John Nicholson	5,321	74.9	
Liberal Reform	Edward Beeby	1,785	25.1	
Total formal votes		7,106	97.8	
Informal votes		161	2.2	
Turnout		7,267	65.2	
Labour hold				

=== Elections in the 1900s ===
==== 1907 ====
1907 New South Wales state election: Wollongong
Party	Candidate	Votes	%	±%
Labour	John Nicholson	3,333	56.6	
Liberal Reform	Alexander Campbell	2,556	43.4	
Total formal votes		5,889	96.9	
Informal votes		189	3.1	
Turnout		6,078	68.5	
Labour hold				

==== 1904 ====
1904 New South Wales state election: Wollongong
Party	Candidate	Votes	%	±%
Labour	John Nicholson	3,126	55.5	
Liberal Reform	Edward Allen	2,511	44.5	
Total formal votes		5,637	99.3	
Informal votes		40	0.7	
Turnout		5,677	71.5	
Labour win		(new seat)		

Wollongong was a new seat comprising parts of the abolished seats of Woronora and Illawarra and was originally going to retain the name Woronora, John Nicholson (Labour) was the member for Woronora while Edward Allen (Liberal Reform) was the member for Illawarra.
