= Electoral results for the district of Wagga Wagga =

Results in New South Wales, Australia

Wagga Wagga, an electoral district of the Legislative Assembly in the Australian state of New South Wales, has had three incarnations, the first from 1894 to 1904, the second from 1913 to 1920, and the third from 1927 to the present.

== Members for Wagga Wagga ==
First incarnation (1894–1904)
Election	Member	Party
1894	James Gormly	Protectionist
1895	James Gormly	Protectionist
1898	James Gormly	Protectionist
1901	James Gormly	Progressive
Second incarnation (1913–1920)
Election	Member	Party
1913	Walter Boston	Labor
1917	George Beeby	Nationalist
Third incarnation (1927–present)
Election	Member	Party
1927	Matthew Kilpatrick	Country
1930	Matthew Kilpatrick	Country
1932	Matthew Kilpatrick	Country
1935	Matthew Kilpatrick	Country
1938	Matthew Kilpatrick	Country
1941	Eddie Graham	Labor
1944	Eddie Graham	Labor
1947	Eddie Graham	Labor
1950	Eddie Graham	Labor
1953	Eddie Graham	Labor
1956	Eddie Graham	Labor
1957 by	Wal Fife	Liberal
1959	Wal Fife	Liberal
1962	Wal Fife	Liberal
1965	Wal Fife	Liberal
1968	Wal Fife	Liberal
1971	Wal Fife	Liberal
1973	Wal Fife	Liberal
1975 by	Joe Schipp	Liberal
1976	Joe Schipp	Liberal
1978	Joe Schipp	Liberal
1981	Joe Schipp	Liberal
1984	Joe Schipp	Liberal
1988	Joe Schipp	Liberal
1991	Joe Schipp	Liberal
1995	Joe Schipp	Liberal
1999	Daryl Maguire	Liberal
2003	Daryl Maguire	Liberal
2007	Daryl Maguire	Liberal
2011	Daryl Maguire	Liberal
2015	Daryl Maguire	Liberal
2018	Joe McGirr	Independent
2019	Joe McGirr	Independent
2023	Joe McGirr	Independent

== Election results ==
=== Elections in the 2020s ===
==== 2023 ====
2023 New South Wales state election: Wagga Wagga
Party	Candidate	Votes	%	±%
Independent	Joe McGirr	21,783	44.2	−1.9
National	Andrianna Benjamin	7,267	14.7	−11.3
Labor	Keryn Foley	6,729	13.6	−1.1
Liberal	Julia Ham	6,526	13.2	+13.2
Shooters, Fishers, Farmers	Christopher Smith	3,777	7.7	−1.1
Greens	Ray Goodlass	2,764	5.6	+2.8
Public Education	Raymond Gentles	464	0.9	+0.9
Total formal votes		49,310	96.6	−0.2
Informal votes		1,721	3.4	+0.2
Turnout		51,031	88.9	−1.5
Notional two-party-preferred count
National	Andrianna Benjamin	16,287	56.2	−1.3
Labor	Keryn Foley	12,719	43.8	+1.3
Two-candidate-preferred result
Independent	Joe McGirr	28,435	72.4	+6.9
National	Andrianna Benjamin	10,847	27.6	−6.9
Independent hold		Swing	+6.9	

=== Elections in the 2010s ===
==== 2019 ====
2019 New South Wales state election: Wagga Wagga
Party	Candidate	Votes	%	±%
Independent	Joe McGirr	21,682	44.63	+19.23
National	Mackenna Powell	12,635	26.01	+26.01
Labor	Dan Hayes	7,141	14.70	−9.00
Shooters, Fishers, Farmers	Seb McDonagh	4,242	8.73	+1.17
Greens	Ray Goodlass	1,346	2.77	−0.13
Conservatives	Colin Taggart	843	1.74	+1.74
Independent	Matt Quade	689	1.42	+1.42
Total formal votes		48,578	96.80	+0.01
Informal votes		1,607	3.20	−0.01
Turnout		50,185	90.12	−0.14
Two-party-preferred result
National	Mackenna Powell	18,055	57.51	+57.51
Labor	Dan Hayes	13,338	42.49	−7.61
Two-candidate-preferred result
Independent	Joe McGirr	26,869	65.47	+5.87
National	Mackenna Powell	14,169	34.53	+34.53
Independent hold		Swing	+5.87	

Note that the swing here is relative to the 2018 Wagga Wagga state by-election.

==== 2018 by-election ====
2018 Wagga Wagga by-election Saturday 8 September
Party	Candidate	Votes	%	±%
Liberal	Julia Ham	12,031	25.5	−28.3
Independent	Joe McGirr	12,003	25.4	+25.4
Country Labor	Dan Hayes	11,197	23.7	−4.4
Independent	Paul Funnell	5,028	10.6	+0.9
Shooters, Fishers, Farmers	Seb McDonagh	4,682	9.9	+9.9
Greens	Ray Goodlass	1,377	2.9	−2.1
Christian Democrats	Tom Arentz	900	1.9	−0.4
Total formal votes		47,218	96.8	+0.0
Informal votes		1,561	3.2	−0.0
Turnout		48,779	88.3	−1.9
Two-party-preferred result
Country Labor	Dan Hayes	18,495	50.1	+13.0
Liberal	Julia Ham	18,389	49.9	−13.0
Two-candidate-preferred result
Independent	Joe McGirr	23,001	59.6	+59.6
Liberal	Julia Ham	15,570	40.4	−22.5
Independent gain from Liberal		Swing	N/A	

Daryl Maguire, (Liberal/Independent) resigned.

==== 2015 ====
2015 New South Wales state election: Wagga Wagga
Party	Candidate	Votes	%	±%
Liberal	Daryl Maguire	25,061	53.8	+0.2
Labor	Dan Hayes	13,084	28.1	+18.0
Independent Country	Paul Funnell	4,523	9.7	+9.7
Greens	Kevin Poynter	2,320	5.0	+1.6
Christian Democrats	Keith Pech	1,111	2.4	+0.0
No Land Tax	Joe Sidoti	515	1.1	+1.1
Total formal votes		46,614	96.8	−0.6
Informal votes		1,548	3.2	+0.6
Turnout		48,162	90.3	+0.4
Two-party-preferred result
Liberal	Daryl Maguire	26,704	62.9	−14.9
Labor	Dan Hayes	15,756	37.1	+14.9
Liberal hold		Swing	−14.9	

==== 2011 ====
2011 New South Wales state election: Wagga Wagga
Party	Candidate	Votes	%	±%
Liberal	Daryl Maguire	24,393	53.5	−5.5
Hatton's Independent Team	Joe McGirr	13,960	30.6	+30.6
Labor	Glenn Elliott-Rudder	4,609	10.1	−22.4
Greens	Ros Prangnell	1,527	3.4	−5.0
Christian Democrats	Sylvia Mulholland	1,070	2.3	+2.3
Total formal votes		45,559	97.8	−0.1
Informal votes		1,028	2.2	+0.1
Turnout		46,587	92.3	
Notional two-party-preferred count
Liberal	Daryl Maguire	28,628	77.8	+14.8
Labor	Glenn Elliott-Rudder	8,172	22.2	−14.8
Two-candidate-preferred result
Liberal	Daryl Maguire	25,542	60.3	−2.8
Hatton's Independent Team	Joe McGirr	16,823	39.7	+39.7
Liberal hold		Swing	−2.8	

=== Elections in the 2000s ===
==== 2007 ====
2007 New South Wales state election: Wagga Wagga
Party	Candidate	Votes	%	±%
Liberal	Daryl Maguire	25,750	59.1	+10.6
Labor	Glenn Elliott-Rudder	14,196	32.6	−0.2
Greens	Ray Goodlass	3,661	8.4	+2.9
Total formal votes		43,607	97.9	−0.2
Informal votes		947	2.1	+0.2
Turnout		44,554	93.2	
Two-party-preferred result
Liberal	Daryl Maguire	26,453	63.0	+0.3
Labor	Glenn Elliott-Rudder	15,506	37.0	−0.3
Liberal hold		Swing	+0.4	

==== 2003 ====
2003 New South Wales state election: Wagga Wagga
Party	Candidate	Votes	%	±%
Liberal	Daryl Maguire	23,530	58.9	+33.5
Labor	Col McPherson	12,645	31.7	+5.4
Greens	Jim Rees	2,259	5.7	+5.7
One Nation	Daniel Chermak	761	1.9	−6.1
Democrats	Rex Graham	725	1.8	−0.9
Total formal votes		39,920	98.0	−0.2
Informal votes		798	2.0	+0.2
Turnout		40,718	92.1	
Two-party-preferred result
Liberal	Daryl Maguire	24,162	63.7	+6.2
Labor	Col McPherson	13,749	36.3	−6.2
Liberal hold		Swing	+6.2	

=== Elections in the 1990s ===
==== 1999 ====
1999 New South Wales state election: Wagga Wagga
Party	Candidate	Votes	%	±%
Labor	Col McPherson	10,391	26.3	−6.8
Liberal	Daryl Maguire	10,032	25.4	−29.7
National	Jim Booth	9,052	22.9	+19.7
Independent	Peter Dale	4,214	10.7	+10.7
One Nation	Greg Jerrick	3,147	8.0	+8.0
Independent	Leigh Campbell	1,650	4.2	+4.2
Democrats	Rex Graham	1,071	2.7	+2.5
Total formal votes		39,557	98.3	+2.8
Informal votes		695	1.7	−2.8
Turnout		40,252	93.4	
Two-party-preferred result
Liberal	Daryl Maguire	18,297	57.5	−5.3
Labor	Col McPherson	13,500	42.5	+5.3
Liberal hold		Swing	−5.3	

==== 1995 ====
1995 New South Wales state election: Wagga Wagga
Party	Candidate	Votes	%	±%
Liberal	Joe Schipp	19,566	56.1	−9.7
Labor	Col McPherson	12,227	35.0	+0.9
Independent	Jim Rees	3,103	8.9	+8.9
Total formal votes		34,896	95.2	+10.1
Informal votes		1,752	4.8	−10.1
Turnout		36,648	93.7	
Two-party-preferred result
Liberal	Joe Schipp	20,702	60.7	−5.1
Labor	Col McPherson	13,415	39.3	+5.1
Liberal hold		Swing	−5.1	

==== 1991 ====
1991 New South Wales state election: Wagga Wagga
Party	Candidate	Votes	%	±%
Liberal	Joe Schipp	19,031	65.8	−1.7
Labor	Geoff Burch	9,886	34.2	+4.9
Total formal votes		28,917	85.1	−12.8
Informal votes		5,064	14.9	+12.8
Turnout		33,981	93.8	
Liberal hold		Swing	−4.5	

=== Elections in the 1980s ===
==== 1988 ====
1988 New South Wales state election: Wagga Wagga
Party	Candidate	Votes	%	±%
Liberal	Joe Schipp	22,085	72.6	+12.2
Labor	Geoffrey Burch	8,321	27.4	−4.3
Total formal votes		30,406	97.9	−0.8
Informal votes		662	2.1	+0.8
Turnout		31,068	90.9	
Liberal hold		Swing	+6.8	

==== 1984 ====
1984 New South Wales state election: Wagga Wagga
Party	Candidate	Votes	%	±%
Liberal	Joe Schipp	18,923	61.3	+10.0
Labor	Barry Leal	10,339	33.5	−4.2
Democrats	Scott Milne	1,609	5.2	−5.7
Total formal votes		30,871	98.5	0.0
Informal votes		456	1.5	0.0
Turnout		31,327	92.3	+0.2
Two-party-preferred result
Liberal	Joe Schipp		64.0	+9.7
Labor	Barry Leal		36.0	−9.7
Liberal hold		Swing	+9.7	

==== 1981 ====
1981 New South Wales state election: Wagga Wagga
Party	Candidate	Votes	%	±%
Liberal	Joe Schipp	15,351	51.3	−0.8
Labor	Thomas Watson	11,287	37.7	−6.8
Democrats	Rodney Dominish	3,270	10.9	+10.9
Total formal votes		29,908	98.5	
Informal votes		457	1.5	
Turnout		30,365	92.1	
Two-party-preferred result
Liberal	Joe Schipp	16,351	58.1	+4.3
Labor	Thomas Watson	11,787	41.9	−4.3
Liberal hold		Swing	+4.3	

=== Elections in the 1970s ===
==== 1978 ====
1978 New South Wales state election: Wagga Wagga
Party	Candidate	Votes	%	±%
Liberal	Joe Schipp	12,354	52.1	−6.7
Labor	Thomas Watson	10,547	44.5	+3.3
Independent	Anthony Robinson	802	3.4	+3.4
Total formal votes		23,703	98.5	−0.3
Informal votes		354	1.5	+0.3
Turnout		24,057	92.6	−1.3
Two-party-preferred result
Liberal	Joe Schipp	12,620	53.8	−5.0
Labor	Thomas Watson	10,859	46.2	+5.0
Liberal hold		Swing	−5.0	

==== 1976 ====
1976 New South Wales state election: Wagga Wagga
Party	Candidate	Votes	%	±%
Liberal	Joe Schipp	13,245	58.8	−4.8
Labor	Richard Gorman	9,265	41.2	+14.8
Total formal votes		22,510	98.8	+0.3
Informal votes		261	1.2	−0.3
Turnout		22,771	93.9	+1.7
Liberal hold		Swing	−10.9	

==== 1975 by-election ====
1975 Wagga Wagga by-election Saturday 6 December
Party	Candidate	Votes	%	±%
Liberal	Joe Schipp	9,731	45.4	−18.2
Labor	Richard Gorman	7,990	37.2	+10.9
Country	Ronald Hunter	2,904	13.5	+13.5
Workers	Roger Kendall	569	2.7	+2.7
Australia	June Sutherland	195	0.9	−0.9
Independent	William Cooper	67	0.3	+0.3
Total formal votes		21,456	98.7	
Informal votes		282	1.3	−0.2
Turnout		21,738	91.7	
Two-party-preferred result
Liberal	Joe Schipp	13,087	61.0	
Labor	Richard Gorman	8,369	39.0	
Liberal hold		Swing		

Wal Fife (Liberal) resigned to successfully contest the federal seat of Farrer at the next election.

==== 1973 ====
1973 New South Wales state election: Wagga Wagga
Party	Candidate	Votes	%	±%
Liberal	Wal Fife	13,105	63.6	+2.7
Labor	Kenneth Fletcher	5,429	26.4	−3.9
Democratic Labor	Kevin Murphy	1,088	5.3	−3.5
Australia	Pamela Osmond	985	4.8	+4.8
Total formal votes		20,607	98.5	
Informal votes		315	1.5	
Turnout		20,922	92.2	
Two-party-preferred result
Liberal	Wal Fife	14,369	69.7	+1.7
Labor	Kenneth Fletcher	6,238	30.3	−1.7
Liberal hold		Swing	+1.7	

==== 1971 ====
1971 New South Wales state election: Wagga Wagga
Party	Candidate	Votes	%	±%
Liberal	Wal Fife	11,844	60.9	−7.3
Labor	John Skeers	5,889	30.3	+4.7
Democratic Labor	Peter Piltz	1,718	8.8	+2.6
Total formal votes		19,451	98.7	
Informal votes		259	1.3	
Turnout		19,710	92.9	
Two-party-preferred result
Liberal	Wal Fife	13,218	68.0	−5.2
Labor	John Skeers	6,233	32.0	+5.2
Liberal hold		Swing	−5.2	

=== Elections in the 1960s ===
==== 1968 ====
1968 New South Wales state election: Wagga Wagga
Party	Candidate	Votes	%	±%
Liberal	Wal Fife	13,299	68.2	+3.1
Labor	John Skeers	4,984	25.6	−3.3
Democratic Labor	Peter Piltz	1,205	6.2	+0.1
Total formal votes		19,488	98.3	
Informal votes		338	1.7	
Turnout		19,826	93.8	
Two-party-preferred result
Liberal	Wal Fife	14,263	73.2	+3.3
Labor	John Skeers	5,225	26.8	−3.3
Liberal hold		Swing	+3.3	

==== 1965 ====
1965 New South Wales state election: Wagga Wagga
Party	Candidate	Votes	%	±%
Liberal	Wal Fife	12,122	65.1	+7.9
Labor	John Skeers	5,374	28.9	−8.2
Democratic Labor	Anthony Abbey	1,128	6.1	+0.4
Total formal votes		18,624	98.6	−0.3
Informal votes		260	1.4	+0.3
Turnout		18,884	94.7	+0.4
Two-party-preferred result
Liberal	Wal Fife	13,024	69.9	+8.2
Labor	John Skeers	5,600	30.1	−8.2
Liberal hold		Swing	+8.2	

==== 1962 ====
1962 New South Wales state election: Wagga Wagga
Party	Candidate	Votes	%	±%
Liberal	Wal Fife	10,259	57.2	+2.3
Labor	Leonard Brown	6,659	37.1	−0.9
Democratic Labor	Anthony Abbey	1,027	5.7	−1.4
Total formal votes		17,945	98.9	
Informal votes		197	1.1	
Turnout		18,142	94.3	
Two-party-preferred result
Liberal	Wal Fife	11,081	61.7	+1.1
Labor	Leonard Brown	6,864	38.3	−1.1
Liberal hold		Swing	+1.1	

=== Elections in the 1950s ===
==== 1959 ====
1959 New South Wales state election: Wagga Wagga
Party	Candidate	Votes	%	±%
Liberal	Wal Fife	9,571	54.9	
Labor	Dudley Graham	6,615	38.0	
Democratic Labor	Robert Harris	1,239	7.1	
Total formal votes		17,425	98.8	
Informal votes		207	1.2	
Turnout		17,632	94.4	
Two-party-preferred result
Liberal	Wal Fife	10,562	60.6	
Labor	Dudley Graham	6,863	39.4	
Liberal gain from Labor		Swing		

Eddie Graham (Labor) died and Wal Fife (Liberal) won the resulting by-election.

==== 1957 by-election ====
1957 Wagga Wagga by-election Saturday 14 December
Party	Candidate	Votes	%	±%
Labor	Dudley Graham	5,499	35.5	
Liberal	Wal Fife	5,375	34.7	
Country	William Lampe	2,233	14.4	
Democratic Labor	Jim Kennedy	1,983	12.8	
Independent	Alexander Cook	223	1.4	
Independent	John Skeers	91	0.59	
Independent	George O'Donoghue	90	0.58	
Total formal votes		15,494		
Informal votes		546	3.4	
Turnout		16,040	87.5	
Two-party-preferred result
Liberal	Wal Fife	9,148	59.0	
Labor	Dudley Graham	6,346	41.0	
Liberal gain from Labor		Swing		

Eddie Graham (Labor) died.

==== 1956 ====
1956 New South Wales state election: Wagga Wagga
Party	Candidate	Votes	%	±%
Labor	Eddie Graham	10,250	60.3	−3.9
Liberal	Wal Fife	6,743	39.7	+3.9
Total formal votes		16,993	99.2	+1.1
Informal votes		144	0.8	−1.1
Turnout		17,137	93.9	−0.4
Labor hold		Swing	−5.7	

==== 1953 ====
1953 New South Wales state election: Wagga Wagga
Party	Candidate	Votes	%	±%
Labor	Eddie Graham	10,292	64.2	
Liberal	Wal Fife	4,350	27.1	
Country	William Wright	1,279	8.0	
Communist	Leslie Kelton	107	0.7	
Total formal votes		16,028	98.1	
Informal votes		314	1.9	
Turnout		16,342	94.3	
Two-party-preferred result
Labor	Eddie Graham	10,578	66.0	
Liberal	Wal Fife	5,450	34.0	
Labor hold		Swing		

==== 1950 ====
1950 New South Wales state election: Wagga Wagga
Party	Candidate	Votes	%	±%
Labor	Eddie Graham	9,509	59.9	
Liberal	Ivan Jack	3,792	23.9	
Country	Richard Blamey	2,575	16.2	
Total formal votes		15,876	98.8	
Informal votes		190	1.2	
Turnout		16,066	94.0	
Two-party-preferred result
Labor	Eddie Graham		61.0 (Note: Two party preferred vote was estimated.)	
Liberal	Ivan Jack		39.0	
Labor hold		Swing		

=== Elections in the 1940s ===
==== 1947 ====
1947 New South Wales state election: Wagga Wagga
Party	Candidate	Votes	%	±%
Labor	Eddie Graham	9,408	64.7	−3.3
Country	Ernest Wenke	5,141	35.3	+3.3
Total formal votes		14,549	99.0	+0.3
Informal votes		153	1.0	−0.3
Turnout		14,702	94.8	+4.9
Labor hold		Swing	−3.3	

==== 1944 ====
1944 New South Wales state election: Wagga Wagga
Party	Candidate	Votes	%	±%
Labor	Eddie Graham	9,287	68.0	+18.3
Country	John McInnes	4,375	32.0	−10.8
Total formal votes		13,662	98.7	−0.1
Informal votes		182	1.3	+0.1
Turnout		13,844	89.9	−2.8
Labor hold		Swing	+14.2	

==== 1941 ====
1941 New South Wales state election: Wagga Wagga
Party	Candidate	Votes	%	±%
Labor	Eddie Graham	6,850	49.7	
Country	Matthew Kilpatrick	5,900	42.8	
Independent	Ronald Cuttle	1,027	7.5	
Total formal votes		13,777	98.8	
Informal votes		170	1.2	
Turnout		13,947	92.7	
Two-party-preferred result
Labor	Eddie Graham	7,417	53.8	
Country	Matthew Kilpatrick	6,360	46.2	
Labor gain from Country		Swing		

=== Elections in the 1930s ===
==== 1938 ====
1938 New South Wales state election: Wagga Wagga
Party	Candidate	Votes	%	±%
Country	Matthew Kilpatrick	8,092	63.1	−0.4
Labor	Eric McKeig	4,734	36.9	+0.4
Total formal votes		12,826	98.5	−0.2
Informal votes		196	1.5	+0.2
Turnout		13,022	95.3	−0.5
Country hold		Swing	−0.4	

==== 1935 ====
1935 New South Wales state election: Wagga Wagga
Party	Candidate	Votes	%	±%
Country	Matthew Kilpatrick	7,876	63.5	−4.1
Labor (NSW)	Ray Maher	4,529	36.5	+4.1
Total formal votes		12,405	98.7	+0.8
Informal votes		158	1.3	−0.8
Turnout		12,563	95.8	−1.9
Country hold		Swing	−4.1	

==== 1932 ====
1932 New South Wales state election: Wagga Wagga
Party	Candidate	Votes	%	±%
Country	Matthew Kilpatrick	7,909	67.6	+11.2
Labor (NSW)	Kenneth Campbell	3,783	32.4	−11.2
Total formal votes		11,692	97.9	−1.0
Informal votes		251	2.1	+1.0
Turnout		11,943	97.7	+2.6
Country hold		Swing	+11.2	

==== 1930 ====
1930 New South Wales state election: Wagga Wagga
Party	Candidate	Votes	%	±%
Country	Matthew Kilpatrick	6,571	56.4	
Labor	Thomas Lavelle	5,077	43.6	
Total formal votes		11,648	98.9	
Informal votes		132	1.1	
Turnout		11,780	95.1	
Country hold		Swing		

=== Elections in the 1920s ===
==== 1927 ====
This section is an excerpt from 1927 New South Wales state election § Wagga Wagga

1927 New South Wales state election: Wagga Wagga
Party	Candidate	Votes	%	±%
Country	Matthew Kilpatrick	7,602	66.6	
Labor	Edward Locke	3,818	33.4	
Total formal votes		11,420	98.5	
Informal votes		169	1.5	
Turnout		11,589	82.0	
Country win		(new seat)		

==== 1920–1927 ====
District abolished

=== Elections in the 1910s ===
==== 1917 ====
This section is an excerpt from 1917 New South Wales state election § Wagga Wagga

1917 New South Wales state election: Wagga Wagga
Party	Candidate	Votes	%	±%
Nationalist	George Beeby	3,777	52.8	+4.0
Labor	Walter Boston	3,371	47.2	−4.0
Total formal votes		7,148	98.7	+1.3
Informal votes		97	1.3	−1.3
Turnout		7,245	68.8	−4.5
Nationalist gain from Labor		Swing	+4.0	

==== 1913 ====
This section is an excerpt from 1913 New South Wales state election § Wagga Wagga

1913 New South Wales state election: Wagga Wagga
Party	Candidate	Votes	%	±%
Labor	Walter Boston	3,951	51.2	
Liberal Reform	John Fletcher (Note: Also endorsed by Farmers and Settlers.)	3,765	48.8	
Total formal votes		7,716	97.4	
Informal votes		202	2.6	
Turnout		7,918	73.3	
Labor win		(new seat)		

==== 1904–1913 ====
District abolished

==== 1901 ====
This section is an excerpt from 1901 New South Wales state election § Wagga Wagga

1901 New South Wales state election: Wagga Wagga
Party	Candidate	Votes	%	±%
Progressive	James Gormly	1,128	70.1	−0.5
Ind. Progressive	George Coleman	482	29.9	
Total formal votes		1,610	99.5	+0.2
Informal votes		8	0.5	−0.2
Turnout		1,618	65.0	+12.5
Progressive hold				

=== Elections in the 1890s ===
==== 1898 ====
This section is an excerpt from 1898 New South Wales colonial election § Wagga Wagga

1898 New South Wales colonial election: Wagga Wagga
Party	Candidate	Votes	%	±%
National Federal	James Gormly	742	70.6	
Independent	John Norman	309	29.4	
Total formal votes		1,051	99.3	
Informal votes		7	0.7	
Turnout		1,058	52.6	
National Federal hold				

==== 1895 ====
This section is an excerpt from 1895 New South Wales colonial election § Wagga Wagga

1895 New South Wales colonial election: Wagga Wagga
Party	Candidate	Votes	%	±%
Protectionist	James Gormly	648	65.8	
Free Trade	Thomas Halloran	337	34.2	
Total formal votes		985	98.8	
Informal votes		12	1.2	
Turnout		997	57.4	
Protectionist hold				

==== 1894 ====
This section is an excerpt from 1894 New South Wales colonial election § Wagga Wagga

1894 New South Wales colonial election: Wagga Wagga
Party	Candidate	Votes	%	±%
Protectionist	James Gormly	933	77.3	
Independent Labour	James McDarra	274	22.7	
Total formal votes		1,207	98.9	
Informal votes		13	1.1	
Turnout		1,220	68.0	
Protectionist win		(new seat)		
