= 1975 Wagga Wagga state by-election =

Election result for Wagga Wagga, New South Wales, Australia

A by-election was held for the New South Wales Legislative Assembly electorate of Wagga Wagga on 6 December 1975. The election was triggered by the resignation of Wal Fife (Liberal) who had been pre-selected as the Liberal candidate for the next federal election for the division of Farrer. Fife subsequently won the election for Farrer on 13 December 1975.

== Dates ==
Date	Event
15 October 1975	Wal Fife resigned from parliament.
7 November 1975	Writ of election issued by the Speaker of the Legislative Assembly.
13 November 1975	Nominations
6 December 1975	Polling day
23 December 1975	Return of writ

== Background ==
In October 1975 the Australian constitutional crisis was evolving, with speculation about the possibility of an early election, through blocking supply in the Senate. At the 1974 election Labor had won 29 of the 60 seats, the Liberal–Country Coalition had also won 29 seats with the other senators being Steele Hall (Liberal Movement) and Michael Townley (Independent). In February 1975 Townley joined the Liberal party and two Coalition premiers would break longstanding convention in the replacement of two Labor senators. Lionel Murphy, who had resigned to take up an appointment to the High Court, was replaced by independent Cleaver Bunton; and Bertie Milliner, who had died, was replaced by Albert Field, a Labor member who was opposed to Whitlam. Bunton (along with Hall) refused to vote against supply, but Field was prepared to. Field took his seat in the Senate as an Independent on 9 September. Due to a High Court challenge to his appointment, he was on leave from the Senate, unable to exercise a vote, from 1 October 1975, which reduced the number of sitting senators to 59. This gave the Coalition an effective majority, holding 30 of the 59 seats, allowing them to block supply in the Senate.

At the time section 70 of the Commonwealth Electoral Act provided that

70. No person who-

1. is at the date of nomination a Member of the Parliament of a State; or
2. was at any time within fourteen days prior to the date of nomination a member of the Parliament of a State; or
3. has resigned from the Parliament of a State and has the right, under the law of the State, if not elected to the Parliament of the Commonwealth, to be re-elected to the Parliament of the State without the holding of a poll,

shall be capable of being nominated as a Senator, or as a Member of the House of Representatives.

On 15 October 1975 Fife asked a question without notice in the Legislative Assembly:

I address my question to the Premier and Treasurer. Does section 70 of the Commonwealth Electoral Act provide that a nominee for the House of Representatives or the Senate must not have been a member of a State parliament at any time within fourteen days prior to the date of nomination for a House of Representatives seat or a Senate vacancy? Is the Premier aware that, because of the uncertainty as to when the next federal election will be held, I am compelled to resign as member for Wagga Wagga to protect my federal candidature? Will the Premier assure me that during the time the seat of Wagga Wagga may be vacant he and the members of his Government will protect the interests of the Wagga Wagga electorate?

Fife resigned from the Legislative Assembly on the same day.

== Results ==
1975 Wagga Wagga by-election Saturday 6 December
Party	Candidate	Votes	%	±%
Liberal	Joe Schipp	9,731	45.4	−18.2
Labor	Richard Gorman	7,990	37.2	+10.9
Country	Ronald Hunter	2,904	13.5	+13.5
Workers	Roger Kendall	569	2.7	+2.7
Australia	June Sutherland	195	0.9	−0.9
Independent	William Cooper	67	0.3	+0.3
Total formal votes		21,456	98.7	
Informal votes		282	1.3	−0.2
Turnout		21,738	91.7	
Two-party-preferred result
Liberal	Joe Schipp	13,087	61.0	
Labor	Richard Gorman	8,369	39.0	
Liberal hold		Swing		

== See also ==
- Electoral results for the district of Wagga Wagga
- List of New South Wales state by-elections
