= Gordon Bradbery =

Former Lord Mayor of Wollongong (born 1951)

The Right Worshipful Gordon Bradbery AM
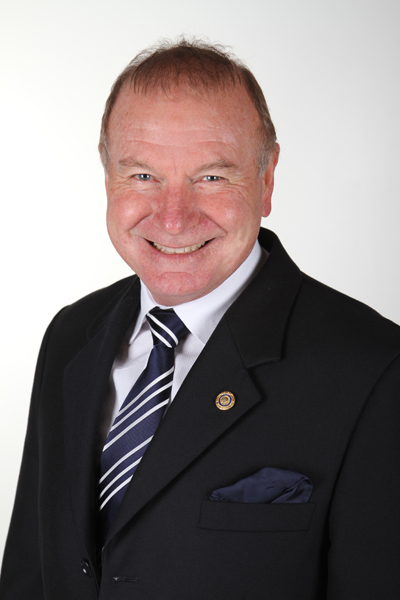

12th Lord Mayor of Wollongong
- In office 3 September 2011 – 14 September 2024
- Deputy: Tania Brown
- Preceded by: Richard Colley; Colin Gellatly; Robert McGregor (Administrators)
- Succeeded by: Tania Brown

Personal details
- Born: Gordon Alfred Bradbery; 8 May 1951 (age 75) Tamworth, New South Wales
- Party: Independent
- Occupation: Pastor, politician

The Reverend Gordon Alfred Bradbery (born 8 May 1951) is the former Lord Mayor of the City of Wollongong and a minister of the Uniting Church, though not active in ministry since 2011. Bradbery was re-elected for another three-year term as Lord Mayor on 4 December 2021.

== Early life and background ==
Born and initially raised in Tamworth, Bradbery moved to Sydney and was schooled at Barnardos Children's Home in Normanhurst between the ages of 10 and 16; an experience Bradbery refers to "being raised at the school of hard knocks".

== Pastoral ministry ==
After leaving school at age sixteen, Bradbery trained as a laboratory technician, and in 1971 joined the Uniting Church as a youth and children's welfare worker. After 14 years as a layman, Bradbery was ordained in 1985 into the Uniting Church ministry.

The majority of Bradbery's 25 years as an ordained minister was spent at the Wollongong Mission of the Uniting Church, known as the "Church on the Mall" in Crown St, Wollongong. In addition to his ministerial duties, Bradbery was also responsible for the Wollongong Community Care Centre that runs regular welfare programs for the disadvantaged, including a popular soup kitchen. Bradbery also worked actively with various elements of the community, adopting specialist areas in community development and social justice programs, as well as trauma and bereavement counselling. Bradbery has been recognised through numerous awards for his work with the disadvantaged, the traumatised and the vulnerable.

In addition to his work as a minister and in the community, Bradbery also undertook continued education, earning bachelor's degrees in psychology, sociology and divinity at the University of Sydney.

Following a meeting of the Presbytery of Illawarra of the Uniting Church, the decision was made not to extend Bradbery's term as the head of the Wollongong Mission beyond 2011, with the chairman, David Jones citing "need to undertake succession planning for Ministry Leadership given the length of time Gordon has been in this placement". There was significant uproar among parts of the Wollongong community as a result of this decision, largely due to Bradbery's extensive community service work. Bradbery remains on the church's list of ordained ministers but, to use the church's terminology, is not in active placement.

== Political career ==
Bradbery was a candidate for the seat of Wollongong in 2011 and 2016.

== Community service ==
Bradbery has held numerous positions outside his church ministry role, including:

- Chairperson of Lifeline South Coast for 15 years
- Police Chaplain – Wollongong Region for 14 years
- Rural Fire Service Chaplain and awarded 10 years service medal
- Police Commissioners Citation – Waterfall Train Disaster – for outstanding welfare assistance
- Interfaith Dialogue with the Muslim and Buddhist Communities
- Mental Health Advocate

== Awards ==
In 1996, Bradbery was awarded the Medal of the Order of Australia, "in recognition of service to the community, particularly for his role during the 1994 Sydney bushfires and the subsequent relief efforts for those affected".

In 1996 and again in 2009, Bradbery was awarded Rotary International's Paul Harris Fellowship Medal for outstanding community service.

In 2018, Bradbery was appointed a Member of the Order of Australia, in recognition of his extensive community service including his service to local government.

== Controversies ==
=== Allegations of antisemitism ===
During the ongoing Gaza war, Bradbery spoke at a pro-Palestinian rally in Wollongong, which was attended by a crowd of around 500. In a speech, Bradbery stated that he "understood why Hamas did what they did". Hamas was designated as a terrorist group in Australia, and Australia is a strong supporter of Israel, with the two countries having close bilateral relations. Bradbery's comments were strongly condemned by Jewish leaders, with the NSW Jewish Board of Deputies claiming that he "sought to justify" the attacks. The board released a statement, which read:

"The mayor's remarks are reprehensible and irresponsible in the extreme. They are not worthy of a community leader and Wollongong residents, including Wollongong's Jewish community, are rightly disturbed and appalled."

When questioned by ABC News, Bradbery defended his comments, stating:

"I don't resile from what I said. I did not support terrorism and made it clear. I'm not supporting that violence and the impact upon innocent Israelis, but what we have done is set up a situation where you confine people to such misery, to such a lack of hope [that] you create such radical responses. I don't in any way support that but at the same I time I understand why it happened."

However, Bradbery acknowledged that he "perhaps" should have made his condemnation of Hamas clearer.

Civic offices
| Preceded by Richard Colley; Colin Gellatly; Robert McGregor as Administrators | Lord Mayor of Wollongong; 2011–date | Incumbent |
