= List of mayors and lord mayors of Wollongong =

Lord Mayor of Wollongong
- Incumbent; Cr. Tania Brown since 14 September 2024
- Style: The Right Worshipful the Lord Mayor of Wollongong
- Appointer: Wollongong City Council
- Term length: Four years
- Inaugural holder: Ald. John Garrett (Mayor); Ald. Ernie Ford (Lord Mayor)
- Formation: 28 February 1859 (as Mayor); 10 April 1970 (as Lord Mayor)
- Deputy: Linda Campbell
- Website: www.wollongong.nsw.gov.au

This is a list of the mayors, lord mayors and administrators of Wollongong City Council and its predecessors, a local government area of New South Wales, Australia. The official title of a lord mayor while holding office is The Right Worshipful Lord Mayor of Wollongong.

== History of the office ==
First incorporated on 28 February 1859 as the 'Municipality of Wollongong', the council became known as the 'City of Wollongong' on 11 September 1942. On 3 September 1947, the City of Wollongong, the Shire of Bulli (established 1906) and the Municipalities of Central Illawarra (established 1859) and North Illawarra (established 1868) amalgamated to form the 'City of Greater Wollongong' under the Local Government Act 1919. On 10 April 1970 the council was granted the title of 'Lord Mayor' by Queen Elizabeth II. On 30 October 1970 the official title of the council reverted to become the 'City of Wollongong'. On 1 July 1993 following the enactment of a new Local Government Act, elected representatives of the council were to be known as 'Councillor', replacing the former title of 'Alderman'. Originally nominated annually by the council, the mayor is now popularly elected for a four-year term.

On 4 March 2008, following recommendations from Independent Commission Against Corruption Commissioner Jerrold Cripps QC, the Minister for Local Government requested the Governor of New South Wales to dismiss the council and install a panel of administrators (Gabrielle Kibble AO, Dr Colin Gellatly and Robert McGregor AM) for four years citing clear evidence of systemic corruption in the Council.

The panel of administrators ran Wollongong City Council until the elections held on the 3 September 2011, when Councillor Gordon Bradbery (Independent) was elected as Lord Mayor. Bradbery was re-elected in 2017 for a further three-year term and continued to serve as Lord Mayor.

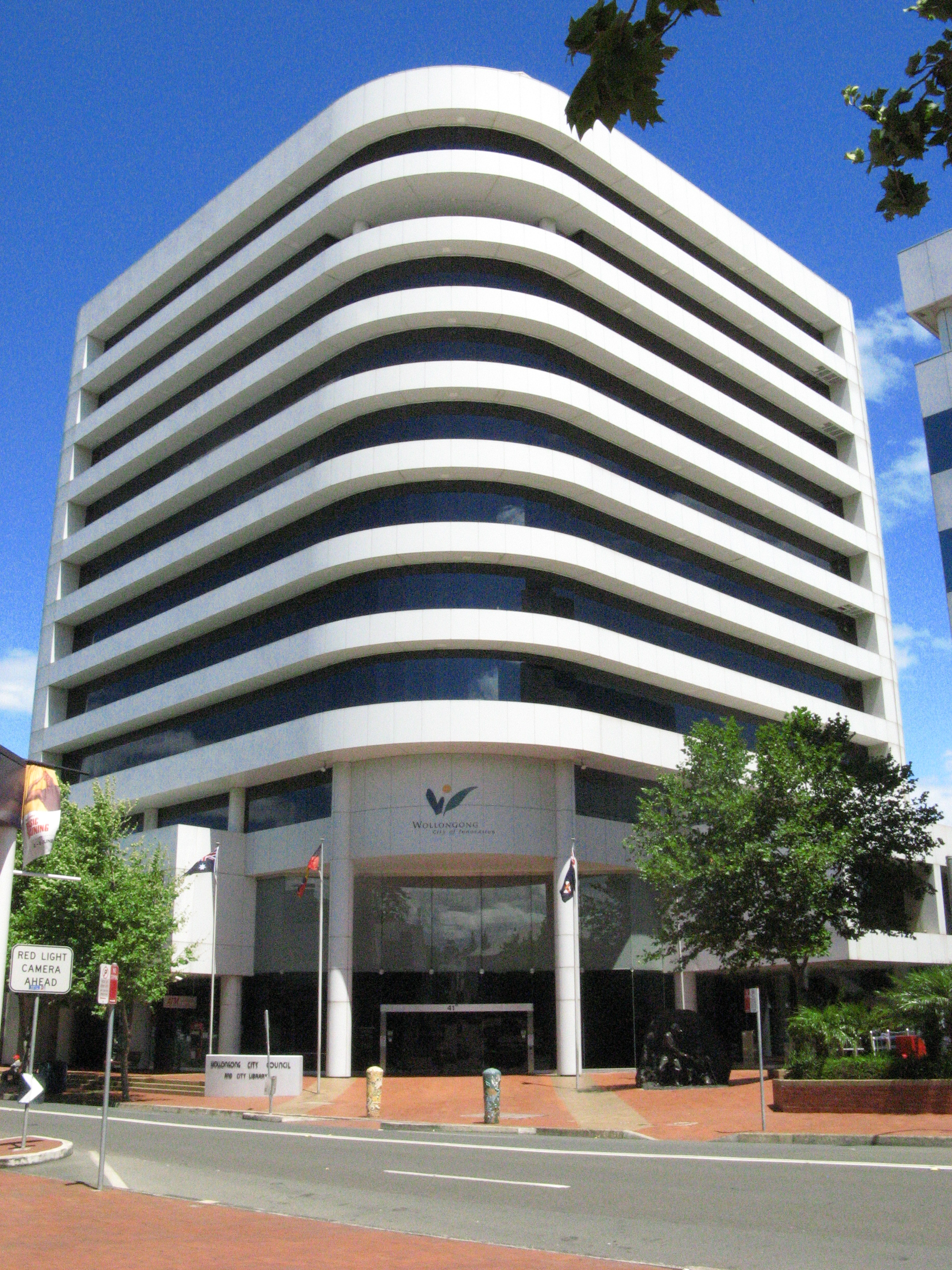
The Wollongong City Council Administration Building has been the seat of the council since 1987.

In the most recent council elections held in September 2024, Tania Brown (Labor) was elected as Lord Mayor of Wollongong, succeeding Bradbery after his decision not contest the elections.

== List of incumbents ==
=== Wollongong Municipal/City Council, 1859–1946 ===
Years	Mayors	Notes
1859–????	John Garrett	
1868	Charles Throsby Smith	
9 December 1946 – 3 September 1947	Charles Dawson	

=== Central Illawarra Shire Council, 1859–1947 ===
Years	Shire Presidents	Notes		
		1912-13, 1920-22, 1925-28, 1931-33 1937 James William Gorrell	3 December 1945 – 3 September 1947	Harry Graham

=== North Illawarra Municipal Council, 1868–1947 ===
Years	Mayors	Notes
????	Andrew Lysaght Snr.	
1886, 1887 and 1894	Patrick Lahiff	
1901–1902	Andrew Lysaght Jnr.	
c. 1915	William Maurice Madden	
8 December 1944 – 3 September 1947	Oscar James Thomas Murphy	

=== Bulli Shire Council, 1906–1947 ===
Years	Shire Presidents	Notes
8 December 1906 – 10 February 1908	William P. Mitchell	
10 February 1908 – 1 February 1909	James Davidson	
1 February 1909 – 14 February 1910	John Stephen Kirton	
14 February 1910 – 13 February 1911	Phillip Spiller	
13 February 1911 – 9 February 1914	John Stephen Kirton	
9 February 1914 – 7 February 1916	James Davidson	
7 February 1916 – 4 February 1918	John Stephen Kirton	
4 February 1918 – 5 February 1920	James Davidson	
5 February 1920 – 7 December 1922	W. H. Tresidder	
7 December 1922 – 14 December 1925	H. McNaughton	
14 December 1925 – 13 December 1926	A. Southern	
13 December 1926 – 9 December 1929	Alfred Herbert Fackender	
9 December 1929 – 9 December 1931	Laurie Kelly Snr.	
9 December 1931 – 14 December 1936	Arthur Frederick Morrison	
14 December 1936 – 12 December 1938	Edward James Ryan	
12 December 1938 – 11 December 1939	John Clowes	
11 December 1939 – 10 December 1941	Robert Thompson	
10 December 1941 – 3 December 1945	Con Quilkey	
3 December 1945 – 3 September 1947	Laurie Kelly Snr.	

=== Greater Wollongong/Wollongong City Council, 1947–present ===
Years	Mayors	Notes
12 December 1947 – 7 December 1949	Harry Graham	
7 December 1949 – 5 December 1951	Charles Dawson	
5 December 1951 – December 1956	Jerry Kelly	
December 1956 – December 1965	Albert Squires	
December 1965 – December 1968	Tony Bevan	
December 1968 – 10 April 1970	Ernie Ford	
Years	Lord Mayors	Notes
10 April 1970 – September 1971	Ernie Ford	
September 1971 – September 1974	John Parker	
27 September 1974 – September 1991	Frank Arkell	
September 1991 – March 1999	David Campbell	
March 1999 – September 2002	George Harrison	
14 September 2002 – 4 March 2008	Alex Darling	
4 March 2008 – 16 December 2009	Gabrielle Kibble AO (Administrator)	
16 December 2009 – 2 September 2011	Richard Colley (Administrator)	
4 March 2008 – 2 September 2011	Dr Colin Gellatly (Administrator)	
4 March 2008 – 2 September 2011	Robert McGregor (Administrator)	
3 September 2011 – 14 September 2024	Rev Gordon Bradbery AM	
14 September 2024 – Present	Tania Brown	

== Election results ==
=== 2024 ===
2024 New South Wales mayoral elections: Wollongong
Party	Candidate	Votes	%	±%
Labor	Tania Brown	51,260	41.2	+12.6
Greens	Jess Whittaker	29,479	23.7	+10.7
Independent	Ryan Morris	21,705	17.4	+17.4
Ind. Sustainable Australia	Andrew Anthony	16,296	13.1	+8.0 (Note: Compared to results as an endorsed Sustainable Australia Party candidate at the 2021 election.)
Independent	Suzanne de Vive	5,751	4.6	+4.6
Total formal votes		124,491	92.6	−4.0
Informal votes		9,949	7.4	+4.0
Turnout		134,440	84.4	−0.8
Two-candidate-preferred result
Labor	Tania Brown	58,936	61.2	+12.6
Greens	Jess Whittaker	37,311	38.8	+38.8
Labor gain from Wollongong Independents		Swing	N/A	

=== 2021 ===
2021 New South Wales mayoral elections: Wollongong
Party	Candidate	Votes	%	±%
Wollongong Independents	Gordon Bradbery	38,741	30.4	−4.7
Labor	Tania Brown	36,430	28.6	+1.2
Liberal	John Dorahy	24,434	19.2	+2.6
Greens	Mithra Cox	16,539	13.0	+2.6
Sustainable Australia	Andrew Anthony	6,454	5.1	+3.6
Independent	Marie Glykis	4,642	3.6	+3.6
Total formal votes		127,240	96.6	
Informal votes		4,500	3.4	
Turnout		131,740	85.2	
Two-candidate-preferred result
Wollongong Independents	Gordon Bradbery	49,760	51.4	−2.8
Labor	Tania Brown	47,094	48.6	+2.8
Wollongong Independents hold		Swing	−2.8	

=== 2017 ===
2017 New South Wales mayoral elections: Wollongong
Party	Candidate	Votes	%	±%
Wollongong Independents	Gordon Bradbery	41,581	35.2	+0.2
Labor	David Brown	32,386	27.4	+8.1
Liberal	John Dorahy	19,672	16.6	−6.4
Greens	Mithra Cox	12,291	10.4	+4.7
Independent	John Mullan	4,037	3.4	+3.4
Independent	Vicki Curran	3,280	2.8	+0.4
Independent	Andrew Anthony	1,708	1.4	−0.2
Independent	Greg Petty	1,660	1.4	−0.7
Independent	Warwick Erwin	1,590	1.3	+1.3
Total formal votes		118,205	95.2	
Informal votes			4.8	
Turnout			82.4	
Two-candidate-preferred result
Wollongong Independents	Gordon Bradbery	47,465	54.2	
Labor	David Brown	40,067	45.8	
Wollongong Independents hold		Swing		
