= Mark Valera =

Australian murderer (born 1979)

- Born: 24 April 1979 (age 47)
- Other name: Mark van Krevel
- Status: Incarcerated at Goulburn Correctional Centre
- Conviction: Murder x 2
- Penalty: 2 x life imprisonment without parole

Mark Valera (previously Mark van Krevel) (born 24 April 1979) is an Australian murderer who was convicted in 2000 of the murders of David O'Hearn and Frank Arkell in Wollongong, New South Wales. Valera handed himself into police after the murders, and in court accused his father of violent and sexual abuse, citing this as the reason he himself turned violent. His sister, Belinda van Krevel, later organised for their father to be murdered by a family friend. Valera is currently incarcerated at the Goulburn Correctional Centre, where he is serving a life sentence with no possibility of parole.

== Crimes ==
=== Murder of David O'Hearn ===
David O'Hearn, a 59 year old man who lived alone, was murdered in his Albion Park home on 12 June 1998. O'Hearn was a local shopkeeper, and after he failed to open his Kanahooka Road corner shop a family member attended his home and discovered his body.

It was a scene I'd never encountered in all my years in the police...there was a body of a male laying on his back...he had been decapitated with his hand sitting on a lounge and it appeared he was completely disembowelled with his intestines on a silver tray beside the body

— Detective Inspector Peter Woods

This quote from a seasoned homicide detective of the New South Wales Police Force encapsulates the particularly grisly murder of O'Hearn. The severity of the injuries meant a specific cause of death was unable to be determined, however massive head injuries and skull fracture from a bloodied wine decanter were considered the most likely cause.

Post mortem injuries to O'Hearn were uniquely gruesome. The attending forensic pathologist, Dr Allan Cala, determined these injuries had indeed been caused post-death due to minimal blood being associated with these injuries. O'Hearn had been mutilated, with Dr Cala observing five intersecting and parallel incised wounds on the lower chest. He was decapitated, with his head later found in the kitchen sink. As stated by Woods, the intestines were then displayed on a silver tray from O'Hearn's living room. The severed hand of O'Hearn was used to draw a pentagram and an inverted crucifix on the living room walls. Valera happened to live only a few houses away from O'Hearn. Valera was only 19 years old at the time of the murder.

==== Investigation ====
Given the nature of the crime and the drawings on the wall, police initially looked into the murders as potentially being linked to a satanic cult. After learning about a man with satanic leanings named Keith Schreiber, police attended his residence and spoke to Valera, who was then Schreiber's roommate. A number of satanic drawings were found in Schreiber's possession, which were noted as being consistent with the crime scene of the O'Hearn murder.

=== Murder of Frank Arkell ===
Two weeks after the O'Hearn murder on 26 June 1998, Frank Arkell, a former Wollongong mayor and former member of the New South Wales State Parliament, was murdered in his Wollongong home on 26 June 1998. His head had been smashed in with a bedside lamp, with the electric cord wrapped tightly around his neck. Like with the O'Hearn murder, post mortem injuries had occurred. Tie pins were stuck in Arkell's eyes and cheeks. Arkell had been mentioned in the Wood Royal Commission's report; he had been embroiled in child pornography and paedophilia scandals in the years leading up to his death, and he had been acquitted of child sex offences six months before his murder, but investigations were continuing, with further charges to be laid.

==== Investigation ====
Few leads were produced from the O'Hearn crime scene, There was a Young Male from Barrack Heights who was spoken to by police and taken into custody for questioning. After an investigation, The other lead involved 2 males from the Albion Park Region. Police quickly realised that Schreiber was not involved as he had been residing elsewhere on the day of the murder for work. At the Arkell murder, however, a pair of bloodstained pants and boots led to a tip-off from a woman claiming these belonged to her ex-boyfriend, Valera. Valera's interview notes from when police had spoken to him about Schreiber were examined, and his fingerprints matched those at the O'Hearn crime scene.

== Aftermath ==
=== Confession ===
Police prepared to arrest Valera, but before they could do so he presented himself at Wollongong Police Station where he then confessed. Valera told police that the killing of O'Hearn was "just random" and that he didn't know if O'Hearn was homosexual or not. He had killed Arkell, an alleged paedophile, because he was a "very, very horrible man".

=== Trial ===
At his trial in 2000, Valera attempted to run a homosexual advance defense, claiming that his father, Jack van Krevel, had sexually and physically assaulted him during his childhood and that this had caused him to lose control when each of O'Hearn and Arkell had sexually propositioned him and this caused flashbacks of his troubled childhood. Valera's evidence was that he was propositioned by O'Hearn immediately before the killing occurred while Arkell had seduced him and that they had been in a sexual relationship for more than a year but Arkell wanted him to be the active partner for the first time immediately before Valera killed him. In convicting Valera of murder the jury had rejected the homosexual advance defence. In sentencing Valera to two terms of life imprisonment, Justice Tim Studdert found that Valera's father had been violent towards him, but rejected Valera's evidence that he had been sexually abused by his father or that either O'Hearn or Arkell had propositioned him and that this prompted a loss of self control.

=== Sentencing and conviction ===
Valera pleaded not guilty to the murders, instead pleading guilty to manslaughter. This plea was rejected by Crown prosecutors, and so the case went to trial. In August 2000, Valera was found guilty of the murders, and in December 2000 he was sentenced to two consecutive terms of life imprisonment without the possibility of parole. At sentencing, Justice Studdert noted "the scene that presented itself to those who entered the deceased's premises on that Saturday morning can only be described as gruesome in the extreme.

It was a scene that was captured on the photographs then taken and tendered in evidence at the trial. These photographs comprehensively depict what was described in oral evidence and they are acutely disturbing." Studdert noted previous court decisions observing that some cases where the level of culpability is so extreme that community interest in retribution and punishment can only be met through a life sentence. Studdert then stated the "Heinousness involved in these two killings does not allow for the imposition of anything less than imprisonment for life".

He later appealed against the sentence but the appeal was dismissed. He is serving his sentence at Goulburn Correctional Centre.

During the investigation into the murders, investigators believed the O'Hearn and Arkell murders were linked to murder of convicted child sex offender Trevor Parkin, who was bashed with a bowling ball and partially dismembered at his flat in Glebe on 27 December 1997. However, detectives concluded that O'Hearn was neither known to Arkell, nor involved in the same illicit sexual activities. Valera was later cleared by detectives of the Parkin murder. In March 2000, detectives charged 20-year-old Christopher Robinson for the murder of Trevor Parkin.

At the time of Parkin's murder, Robinson worked as a prostitute and had been known for robbing his clients. Robinson was convicted of the murder and was sentenced to 45 years imprisonment with a non-parole period of 35 years.

== Further family issues ==
Less than two weeks after Valera became the third-youngest person in NSW to be sentenced to life without parole; his father, Jack van Krevel, was found stabbed to death in his Albion Park home. It was later found that Valera's sister and van Krevel's daughter, Belinda van Krevel, had 'asked' Keith Schreiber (a friend of Valera's who was also a suspect in the O'Hearn murder) to kill her father because he was molesting her two-year-old daughter, and blamed him for Valera's imprisonment. Schreiber was found guilty of the murder and was sentenced to life imprisonment with a non-parole period of 12 years. He became eligible for parole in 2012.

Belinda van Krevel, who had been in a relationship with Schreiber, pleaded guilty and was sentenced to six years' imprisonment, with a non-parole period of three and a half years. She was released from prison on 1 June 2007, saying, “I just want to get on with my life.” She was subsequently arrested in 2010 and charged with assault and theft. On 5 July 2013 she was arrested again and charged with the stabbing of her boyfriend. She was sentenced to three years in prison. A decade later, she was arrested for stabbing a second partner in March 2023, in an attack described by a judge as bearing "disturbing similarities" to the 2013 stabbing. She pleaded guilty and was sentenced to six years in prison.
