= 1957 Wagga Wagga state by-election =

Election result for Wagga Wagga, New South Wales, Australia

A by-election was held for the New South Wales Legislative Assembly electorate of Wagga Wagga on 14 December 1957. The election was triggered by the death of Eddie Graham (Labor).

== Dates ==
Date	Event
13 November 1957	Death of Eddie Graham.
20 November 1957	Writ of election issued by the Speaker of the Legislative Assembly.
26 November 1957	Nominations
14 December 1957	Polling day
15 January 1958	Return of writ

== Results ==
1957 Wagga Wagga by-election Saturday 14 December
Party	Candidate	Votes	%	±%
Labor	Dudley Graham	5,499	35.5	
Liberal	Wal Fife	5,375	34.7	
Country	William Lampe	2,233	14.4	
Democratic Labor	Jim Kennedy	1,983	12.8	
Independent	Alexander Cook	223	1.4	
Independent	John Skeers	91	0.59	
Independent	George O'Donoghue	90	0.58	
Total formal votes		15,494		
Informal votes		546	3.4	
Turnout		16,040	87.5	
Two-party-preferred result
Liberal	Wal Fife	9,148	59.0	
Labor	Dudley Graham	6,346	41.0	
Liberal gain from Labor		Swing		

== See also ==
- Electoral results for the district of Wagga Wagga
- List of New South Wales state by-elections
