= 2016 Wollongong state by-election =

Election result for Wollongong, New South Wales, Australia

- 12 November 2016

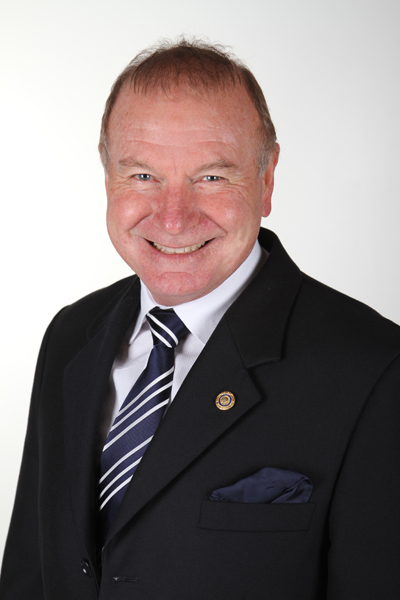

	First party	Second party	Third party
Candidate	Paul Scully	Gordon Bradbery	Cath Blakey
Party	Labor	Independent	Greens
Popular vote	23,588	16,707	5,216
Percentage	48.1%	34.0%	10.6%
Swing	▲7.7pp	▲34.0pp	▲1.1pp
TPP	58.0%	42.0%
TPP swing	▼0.9pp	▲42.0pp
MP before election
Noreen Hay
Labor
Elected MP
Paul Scully
Labor

A by-election for the seat of Wollongong in the New South Wales Legislative Assembly was held on 12 November 2016. The by-election was triggered by the resignation of Noreen Hay (Labor) on 31 August.

By-elections for the seats of Canterbury and Orange were held on the same day.

== Dates ==
Date	Event
23 September 2016	Writ of election issued by the Speaker of the Legislative Assembly and close of electoral rolls.
27 October 2016	Close of nominations for candidates
12 November 2016	Polling day, between the hours of 8 am and 6 pm
25 November 2016	Return of writ

== Candidates ==
The five candidates in ballot paper order were as follows:

Candidate nominations
Party	Candidate	Notes (not on ballot paper)
Labor	Paul Scully	Chief operating officer of the Australian Institute for Innovative Materials at the University of Wollongong.
Christian Democratic Party (Fred Nile Group)	Colleen Baxter	Musician, volunteer community worker and financial/legal clerk.
Independent	Gordon Bradbery	Ordained minister in the Uniting Church in Australia. Lord Mayor of Wollongong from 2012.
Shooters, Fishers and Farmers	Joe Rossi	
The Greens	Cath Blakey	Environmental projects officer. Greens candidate for Cunningham at the 2016 federal election.

== Results ==
2016 Wollongong by-election Saturday 12 November
Party	Candidate	Votes	%	±%
Labor	Paul Scully	23,588	48.1	+7.7
Independent	Gordon Bradbery	16,707	34.0	+34.0
Greens	Cath Blakey	5,216	10.6	+1.1
Shooters, Fishers, Farmers	Joe Rossi	1,793	3.7	+3.7
Christian Democrats	Colleen Baxter	1,769	3.6	+0.7
Total formal votes		49,073	96.8	+0.9
Informal votes		1,605	3.2	−0.9
Turnout		50,678	93.6	+4.5
Two-candidate-preferred result
Labor	Paul Scully	26,739	58.0	−0.9
Independent	Gordon Bradbery	19,336	42.0	+42.0
Labor hold		Swing	N/A	

== See also ==
- Electoral results for the district of Wollongong
- List of New South Wales state by-elections
