= 2018 Wagga Wagga state by-election =

Election result for Wagga Wagga, New South Wales, Australia

- 8 September 2018
- Registered: 55,220
- Turnout: 48,779 (88.3%) (▼1.9 pp)
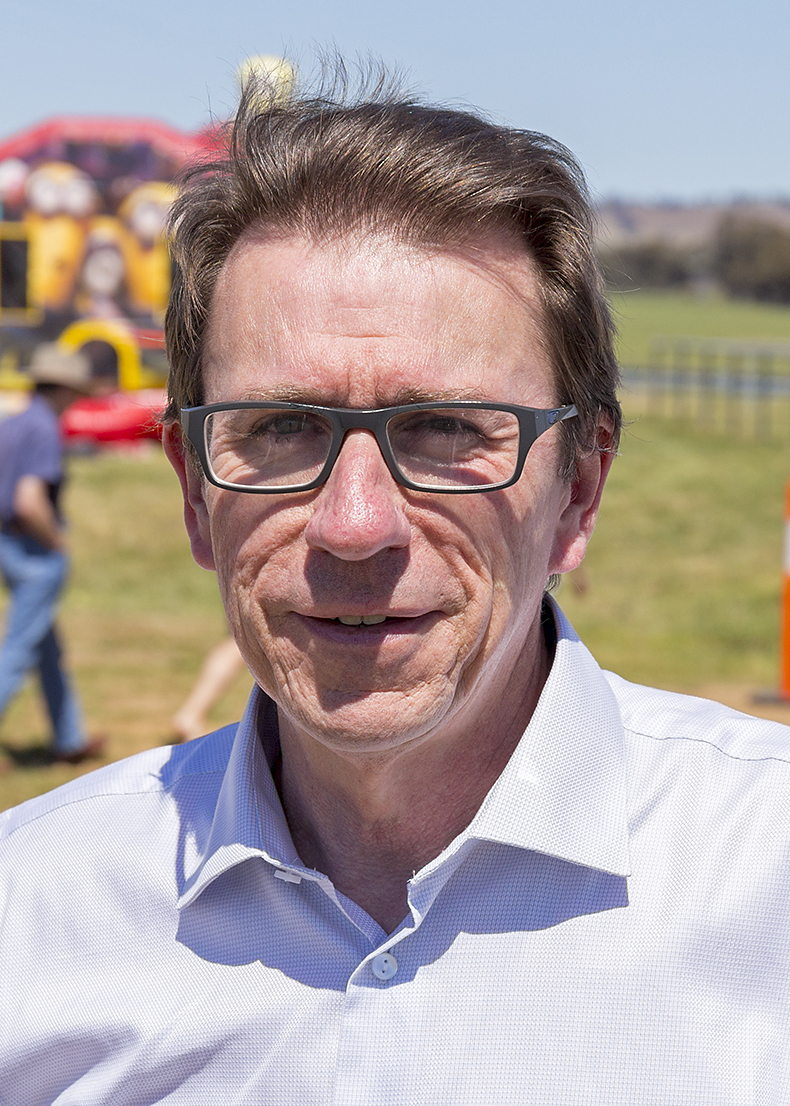

	First party	Second party
Candidate	Joe McGirr	Julia Ham
Party	Independent	Liberal
Primary vote	12,003	12,031
Percentage	25.4%	25.5%
Swing	▲25.4pp	▼28.3pp
TCP	59.6%	40.4%
TCP swing	▲59.6pp	▼22.5pp
	Third party	Fourth party
		IND
Candidate	Dan Hayes	Paul Funnell
Party	Labor	Independent
Primary vote	11,197	5,028
Percentage	23.7%	10.6%
Swing	▼4.4pp	▲0.9pp
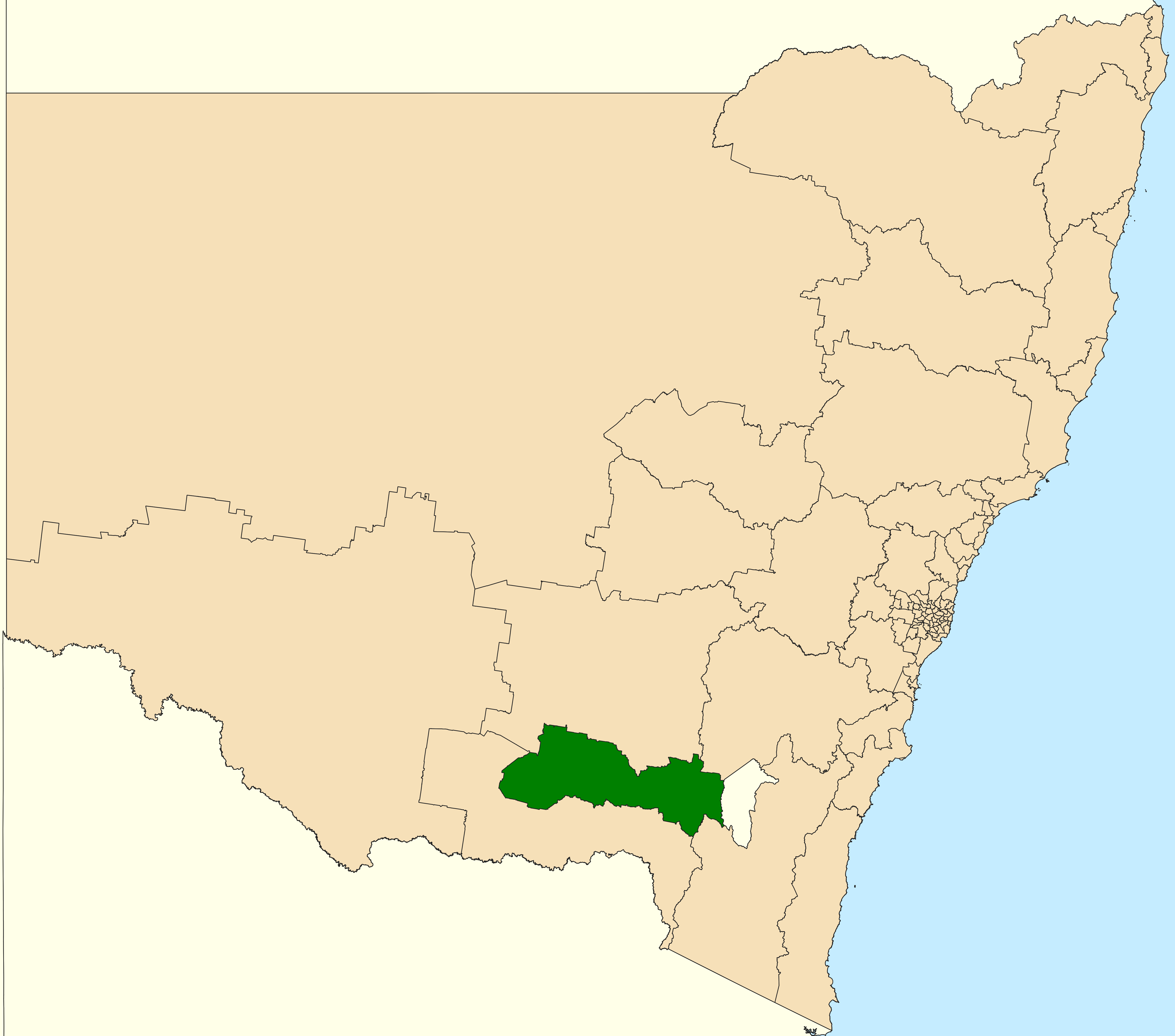
- Location of the electoral district of Wagga Wagga in New South Wales.
MP before election
Daryl Maguire
Liberal
Elected MP
Joe McGirr
Independent

A by-election was held in the New South Wales state electoral district of Wagga Wagga on 8 September 2018. The by-election was triggered by the resignation of Daryl Maguire, a Liberal-turned-independent. Maguire resigned from Parliament the previous month after admitting to a corruption inquiry that he sought payment over a property deal.

The day after the vote ABC psephologist Antony Green predicted the by-election would be won by independent candidate Joe McGirr. McGirr was later confirmed as the victorious candidate by the New South Wales Electoral Commission, winning 59.6% of the two-candidate preferred vote over Liberal candidate Julia Ham. The Liberal primary vote plunged by more than 28% – a loss of more than half of its primary vote from 2015–resulting in the seat falling out of Liberal hands for the first time since 1957. McGirr only trailed the Liberals by 28 votes on the first count, and was elected on Labor preferences.

== Background ==
The Division of Wagga Wagga had been held by the Liberal party since the 1957 Wagga Wagga state by-election. Sitting Liberal MP Daryl Maguire had held the seat since 1999, winning re-election consecutively to serve a total of 5 terms in the House of Assembly.

By July 2018, Maguire had been placed under investigation by the NSW Independent Commission Against Corruption (ICAC), regarding possible corruption involving the former Canterbury Council, through his association with former councillor Michael Hawatt. As a consequence, Maguire resigned from the Liberal Party, and from his roles Parliamentary Secretary for the Centenary of ANZAC, Counter Terrorism, Corrections and Veterans. After initially refusing to resign from Parliament, he announced he would do so before its next sitting, thus triggering the by-election.

The by-election came two weeks after two federal Liberal leadership spills on 21 and 24 August, which resulted in the removal of Prime Minister Malcolm Turnbull.

Two-party-preferred vote in Wagga Wagga, 1978–2015
Election	1978	1981	1984	1988	1991	1995	1999	2003	2007	2011	2015
Liberal	53.8%	58.1%	64.0%	72.6%	65.8%	60.7%	57.5%	63.7%	63.0%	77.8%	62.9%
Labor	46.2%	41.9%	36.0%	27.4%	34.2%	39.3%	42.5%	36.3%	37.0%	22.2%	37.1%
Government	ALP	ALP	ALP	L/NP	L/NP	ALP	ALP	ALP	ALP	L/NP	L/NP

== Key dates ==
The key dates in relation to the by-election were:

- 17 August 2018 – Issue of writ
- 17 August 2018 – Close of electoral rolls
- 23 August 2018 – Close of nominations
- 27 August 2018 – Start of early voting
- 5 September 2018 – Postal vote applications close
- 8 September 2018 – Polling day (8am to 6pm)
- 12 September 2018 – Last day for receipt of postal votes
- 19 October 2018 – Last day for return of writs

== Candidate nominations ==
Independent candidate Dr Joe McGirr, who had previously contested the seat in 2011 garnering over 30% of the vote, and received 39.7% of the two-candidate-preferred count, running for the Hatton's Independent Team. Incredibly, McGirr achieved a 2.8% swing away from the Liberals in an election year that saw a statewide swing of over 16% towards them. McGirr chose to re-contest the seat after opting to not run in the 2015 New South Wales state election, where Wagga Wagga returned to a traditional two-party-preferred contest.

The Greens nominated Ray Goodlass, a former councillor on the Wagga Wagga City Council. Goodlass had also previously contested the seat of Murray in 2017, and the federal Division of Riverina in 2004 and 2007.

Labor nominated psychologist and city councillor Dan Hayes under the Country Labor banner, which was synonymous with the New South Wales Labor Party branch. Country Labor was later deregistered in 2021.

Former business manager and independent CountryMinded candidate in 2015, Paul Funnell, opted to run a second time without a political affiliation. Funnell was a member of the Wagga Wagga City Council at the time of the by-election.

The Nationals elected not to field a candidate, following considerable debate between the two Coalition partners. Although Wagga Wagga had been held by the Liberals without interruption since 1957, a number of Nationals believed Wagga Wagga was naturally a National seat. It is located within an area that has long been considered National heartland, and is mostly served by the safe federal National seat of Riverina. At the time, every state electorate held by the Coalition in regional and rural New South Wales (other than on the South Coast) was held by a National MP, the only exception being Albury (currently both Albury and Port Macquarie are held by the Liberal Party).

=== Ballot paper ===
Candidates
Party	Candidate	Background
Shooters, Fishers and Farmers	Seb McDonagh	Former president of the New South Wales Rural Fire Service Oura brigade and an IT service desk administrator.
Liberal	Julia Ham	Early childhood teacher and consultant who runs a specialist sheep farm and was elected to the Snowy Valleys Council at the 2017 local government elections.
Independent	Joe McGirr	A doctor and associate dean with the University of Notre Dame; previously contested the seat in 2011.
Greens	Ray Goodlass	Former councillor on the Wagga Wagga City Council from 2008-2012; previously contested the seat in 2007.
Christian Democrats	Tom Arentz	Carpenter, builder, foreman, senior estimator and project manager.
Independent	Paul Funnell	Former manager of an IGA supermarket, re-elected member of the Wagga Wagga City Council in 2016.
Country Labor	Dan Hayes	Practising psychologist who was the Labor candidate for the seat at the 2015 state election and was elected to the Wagga Wagga City Council in 2016.

== Results ==
2018 Wagga Wagga by-election
Party	Candidate	Votes	%	±%
Liberal	Julia Ham	12,031	25.5	−28.3
Independent	Joe McGirr	12,003	25.4	+25.4
Country Labor	Dan Hayes	11,197	23.7	−4.4
Independent	Paul Funnell	5,028	10.6	+0.9
Shooters, Fishers, Farmers	Seb McDonagh	4,682	9.9	+9.9
Greens	Ray Goodlass	1,377	2.9	−2.1
Christian Democrats	Tom Arentz	900	1.9	−0.4
Total formal votes		47,218	96.8	+0.0
Informal votes		1,561	3.2	−0.0
Turnout		48,779	88.3	−1.9
Two-party-preferred result
Country Labor	Dan Hayes	18,495	50.1	+13.0
Liberal	Julia Ham	18,389	49.9	−13.0
Two-candidate-preferred result
Independent	Joe McGirr	23,001	59.6	+59.6
Liberal	Julia Ham	15,570	40.4	−22.5
Independent gain from Liberal		Swing	N/A	

== Aftermath ==
The loss of Wagga Wagga reduced the Liberal Party to holding only three rural seats; Albury, Bega, and Goulburn.

The large swing against the Liberals caused Country Labor candidate Dan Hayes to win the two-party-preferred count, being the first candidate to achieve this feat since 1956.

Premier Gladys Berejiklian and several senior colleagues acknowledged that Turnbull’s knifing had deterred some voters in Wagga Wagga. However, Federal Senator Jim Molan dismissed those concerns, saying it “wasn’t a factor”.

McGirr ruled out joining the Coalition once in government.

== See also ==
- Electoral results for the district of Wagga Wagga
- List of New South Wales state by-elections
