= University of Sydney School of Psychology =

School of Psychology
- Type: Public
- Affiliations: University of Sydney
- Location: Camperdown / Darlington, Sydney, Australia; 33.886249°S 151.187947°E
- Website: sydney.edu.au/science/psychology

The School of Psychology is a constituent department of the Faculty of Science at the University of Sydney, Australia. It is the first established School of Psychology in Australia, and currently one of the largest and most prestigious. It is one of many components of the University of Sydney.
