= Frank Arkell =

Australian politician (1935–1998)

Member of the New South Wales Parliament for Wollongong
- In office 24 March 1984 – 3 May 1991
- Preceded by: Eric Ramsay
- Succeeded by: Gerry Sullivan

8th Lord Mayor of Wollongong
- In office 27 September 1974 – September 1991
- Preceded by: John Parker
- Succeeded by: David Campbell

Alderman of the Wollongong City Council
- In office 4 December 1965 – September 1991

Personal details
- Born: 13 September 1935 Port Kembla, New South Wales, Australia
- Died: 26 June 1998 (aged 62) Wollongong, New South Wales, Australia
- Education: Edmund Rice College

Francis Neville (Frank) Arkell (13 September 1935 – 26 June 1998) was an Australian politician. Arkell was a long-serving Lord Mayor of Wollongong and an independent member of the New South Wales Legislative Assembly, representing Wollongong. In 1998, at the age of 62, Arkell was violently murdered in his home by Mark Valera. At the time of his death, he was under police investigation for child sex offences. Continued investigation largely cleared Arkell of wrongdoing, with police concluding that a tape that supposedly recorded Arkell making sexual advances to a teenager had in fact been faked by former Wollongong mayor and pedophile Tony Bevan as blackmail. Arkell was a Knight of the Order of the Star of Italy, according to his biography on the Parliament of NSW site.

== Early life ==
Arkell was born on 13 September 1935 in Port Kembla, New South Wales.

He grew up in a modest house out on the swamplands south of Wollongong, within walking distance of the Port Kembla steelworks that was built in the 1920s and which employed his truck-driving father through the Depression and beyond.

The Arkells sent their sons to the local Christian Brothers College. This school was described by local activist and politician Paul Matters as an environment where a culture of sexual abuse and abuse of power was normalised, which occurred alongside the school's repressive approach to sexuality and morality.

== Political career ==
Between 1974 and 1991, Arkell served as Lord Mayor of Wollongong City Council. He was elected as an independent to represent the seat of Wollongong in the New South Wales Parliament from 1984 until his defeat at the 1991 election.

== Later life and death ==
In October 1996, Franca Arena asked in state parliament whether Arkell was the person known to the Wood Royal Commission as W1 in allegations involving paedophilia.

In 1998, seven years after he had left politics, Arkell was murdered at his home in Wollongong by Mark Valera. Arkell's head had been smashed in with a bedside lamp, an electric cord was wrapped tightly around his neck, and tie-pins protruded from his eyes and cheeks. According to a subsequently broadcast media report, a police investigator revealed that, at the time of his death, Arkell was "...facing charges which had not gone to court..."

Valera told police that he had killed Arkell because he was a "very, very horrible man". At his trial Valera attempted to run a homosexual advance defence, giving evidence that Arkell had seduced him and that they had been in a sexual relationship for more than a year. Valera claimed to have lost control when Arkell wanted him to be the active partner for the first time. Valera also testified that he had been a victim of sexual abuse at the hands of his own father, Jack Van Krevel, from the age of seven. In convicting Valera of murder the jury had rejected the homosexual advance defence. In sentencing Valera to two terms of life imprisonment, Justice Studdert rejected Valera's evidence that he had been sexually abused by his father or that Arkell had asked him to engage in sexual activity and that this prompted a loss of self control.

== Notes ==
Civic offices
Preceded by	Deputy Lord Mayor of Wollongong; 1968–1969	Succeeded by
Preceded by John Parker	Lord Mayor of Wollongong; 1974–1991	Succeeded by David Campbell
New South Wales Legislative Assembly
Preceded by Eric Ramsay	Member for Wollongong; 1984–1991	Succeeded by Gerry Sullivan
