= Eric Ramsay (politician) =

Australian politician

Eric Daniel Ramsay (8 August 1916 – 4 April 1999) was an Australian politician. He was the Labor member for Wollongong in the New South Wales Legislative Assembly from 1971 to 1984.

Ramsay was born at Lithgow and attended Lithgow High School. He became a boilermaker after leaving school. He married Kathleen on 25 February 1939, with whom he had three children. In 1971, Ramsay defeated sitting Liberal MP Jack Hough to win the seat of Wollongong in the New South Wales Legislative Assembly for the Labor Party. His margin was afterwards secure until 1981, when he was almost defeated by Independent candidate Frank Arkell, surviving by fewer than a hundred votes. He retired in 1984, allowing Arkell to win the seat. Ramsay died in 1999.

New South Wales Legislative Assembly
Preceded by Jack Hough	Member for Wollongong; 1971–1984	Succeeded by Frank Arkell
