= Sophie Cotsis =

Australian politician

Sophie Cotsis MP

Minister for Industrial Relations
- Incumbent
- Assumed office 5 April 2023
- Premier: Chris Minns
- Preceded by: Damien Tudehope (as Minister for Employee Relations)

Minister for Work Health and Safety
- Incumbent
- Assumed office 5 April 2023
- Premier: Chris Minns
- Preceded by: Damien Tudehope (as Minister for Employee Relations)

Member of the New South Wales Parliament for Canterbury
- Incumbent
- Assumed office 12 November 2016
- Preceded by: Linda Burney

Member of Legislative Council of New South Wales
- In office 7 September 2010 – 16 September 2016
- Preceded by: John Della Bosca
- Succeeded by: John Graham

Personal details
- Born: 19 November 1973 (age 52) Canterbury, Sydney
- Party: Labor Party
- Occupation: Union organiser

Sophie Cotsis (Greek: Σοφία Κώτση; born 19 November 1973) is an Australian politician and current New South Wales Minister for Industrial Relations and Minister for Work Health and Safety in the Minns ministry since April 2023. She was a Labor member of the New South Wales Legislative Council from 7 September 2010 to 16 September 2016, when she resigned in order to contest a by-election for the Legislative Assembly seat of Canterbury.

== Early life ==
The daughter of Greek migrants, Cotsis grew up in the St George district together with her brother. She was educated at Canterbury South Public School and at Kingsgrove High School before matriculating to Macquarie University, where Cotsis became a member of the university's Hellenic Studies Foundation and established a program that preserved the Greek language and Hellenic heritage at the university. Graduating with a Bachelor of Arts from Macquarie University, Cotsis later completed a Master of Legal Studies at the University of Technology, Sydney.

== Career ==
Prior to entering parliament Cotsis was a hospitality worker at Sydney Airport, later becoming an official with the Labor Council of New South Wales and subsequently the Liquor, Hospitality and Miscellaneous Union. Cotsis joined the Labor Party in 1993, partly inspired by Paul Keating. She later became an adviser to former New South Wales Treasurer Michael Costa until March 2008, when she became an adviser to the infrastructure company Parsons Brinckerhoff.

In September 2010 Cotsis was appointed to the Legislative Council to fill a casual vacancy following the resignation of John Della Bosca. In September 2016, Cotsis resigned from the Legislative Council after she was preselected to contest the Legislative Assembly seat of Canterbury for Labor at the by-election to fill the vacancy left by Linda Burney, who had resigned to contest the federal seat of Barton at the 2016 federal election.

Following Labor's victory at the 2023 NSW election, Cotsis was sworn in as the Minister for Industrial Relations and the Minister for Work Health and Safety on 5 April 2023.

New South Wales Legislative Assembly
Preceded by Linda Burney	Member for Canterbury; 2016–present	Incumbent
