= Daryl Maguire =

Australian politician (born 1959)

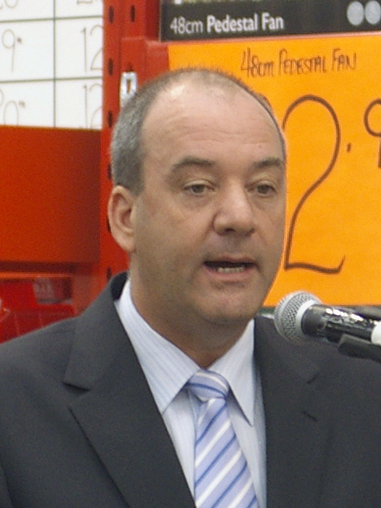
- Maguire in 2009 at the official opening of a Bunnings store in Wagga Wagga

Member of the New South Wales Parliament for Wagga Wagga
- In office 27 March 1999 – 3 August 2018
- Preceded by: Joe Schipp
- Succeeded by: Joe McGirr

Personal details
- Born: Daryl William Maguire; 25 March 1959 (age 67) Hay, New South Wales
- Party: Independent (July – August 2018)
- Other political affiliations: Liberal (until July 2018)
- Spouse: Maureen Maguire (divorced)
- Children: 2

Daryl William Maguire (born 25 March 1959) is a former Australian politician who was a member of the New South Wales Legislative Assembly representing Wagga Wagga for the Liberal Party from 1999 to 2018. On 30 March 2011, Maguire was appointed to Government Whip in the O'Farrell-Stoner Liberal/National coalition government; he had been Opposition Whip for the Coalition since 2003. On 13 July 2018, after admitting at a corruption inquiry that he sought payment over a property deal, Maguire resigned from the Liberal Party. He resigned from Parliament on 3 August. Between 2013 and August 2020, Maguire had an "intimate" relationship with Gladys Berejiklian, who became Premier of New South Wales during that time. He had been estranged from his wife since 2013, and divorce proceedings started in 2018.

== Early years and background ==
Maguire has an extensive involvement with local community organisations. He was married to Maureen Maguire and has two children. Prior to his election to parliament, Maguire worked as a local store proprietor and franchisee. Maguire was previously an advisor to the China Council for the Promotion of Peaceful Reunification of China.

== Political career ==
Maguire was elected to represent Wagga Wagga in 1999 following the retirement of long-standing member, Joe Schipp. Maguire held the seat comfortably whilst in opposition. In 2003, he was elected Opposition Whip and, after the 2011 state election, became Government Whip.

At the 2011 state election, Maguire was challenged by Dr Joe McGirr, a local doctor and Director of the Emergency Department at Wagga Wagga Base Hospital. Maguire suffered a swing against the Liberal Party of 5.5 points, although he won the seat comfortably with 53.5 per cent of the primary vote.

== ICAC investigation ==
In July 2018, Maguire was drawn into an inquiry (Operation Dasha) by the NSW Independent Commission Against Corruption (ICAC) regarding possible corruption involving the former Canterbury Council, through his association with former councillor Michael Hawatt. It was alleged that Maguire had acted on behalf of a "mega big" Chinese client, asking for help in buying into development-approved projects, in return for a commission from the developer for both himself and Hawatt. As a consequence, Maguire resigned from the Liberal Party, and from his roles Parliamentary Secretary for the Centenary of ANZAC, Counter Terrorism, Corrections and Veterans. After initially refusing to resign from Parliament, he announced he would do so before its next sitting. Maguire tendered his resignation to the Speaker of the Legislative of Assembly on the afternoon of 3 August 2018. At the ensuing by-election held on 3 September, the Liberals lost almost half of their primary vote from 2015, allowing independent Joe McGirr to end the Liberals' 61-year hold on Wagga Wagga.

The ICAC, during the course of Operation Dasha, intercepted a series of telephone calls that resulted in a separate inquiry (Operation Keppel) into the conduct of Maguire. Specifically, the ICAC sought to inquire whether, between 2012 and 2018, Maguire engaged in conduct that involved a breach of public trust by using his public office, involving his duties as a Member of Parliament, as a Parliamentary Secretary, and as Chair of the NSW Parliament Asia Pacific Friendship Group to improperly gain a benefit for himself and/or entities close to him. Appearing before the ICAC on 14 October 2020, Maguire admitted that he used his position as a Member of Parliament and as a Parliamentary Secretary to make money for himself and his associates. Appearing before the same ICAC inquiry, Gladys Berejiklian, then Premier of New South Wales, agreed that she had been in a "close personal relationship" with Maguire from 2015 until August 2020. The ICAC hearing heard that Maguire "complained to Ms Berejiklian about his struggle to get funding for several projects, including Wagga Wagga and Tumut hospitals" to which Berejiklian, then Maguire's partner, replied that she’d "fix it". Berejiklian later quit as Premier after the wiretaps exposed her failure to report his potential corrupt statements, as she was formally obligated breaching the Ministerial Code of Conduct included in the ICAC Act by failing to declare their "intimate personal relationship" to avoid a conflict of interest, and also failing to report his statements to ICAC. In June 2025, a magistrate found Maguire guilty of giving false or misleading evidence to the ICAC. On 20 August 2025, Maguire was sentenced to 10 months in prison for giving false evidence. On 26 March 2026, Maguire's conviction for giving misleading evidence to the ICAC was overturned on appeal in the district court.

== Alleged immigration fraud ==
In November 2022, Maguire was charged with criminal conspiracy over an alleged visa fraud committed when he was in parliament. In July 2026, Maguire was found guilty of applying for fraudulent visa applications, and in November 2026 was jailed for three years for these offences.

New South Wales Legislative Assembly
Preceded by Joe Schipp	Member for Wagga Wagga; 1999–2018	Succeeded by Joe McGirr
