= Electoral district of Wollongong =

State electoral district of New South Wales, Australia

Wollongong New South Wales—Legislative Assembly
- Interactive map of district boundaries from the 2023 state election
- State: New South Wales
- Dates current: 1904–1920; 1927–1930; 1968–present
- MP: Paul Scully
- Party: Labor
- Namesake: Wollongong
- Electors: 60,829 (2019)
- Area: 79.25 km^{2} (30.6 sq mi)
- Demographic: Provincial
Electorates around Wollongong:
Keira	Keira	Pacific Ocean
Keira	Wollongong	Pacific Ocean
Shellharbour	Shellharbour	Pacific Ocean

Wollongong is an electoral district of the Legislative Assembly in the Australian state of New South Wales. It is represented by Paul Scully of the Labor Party. Since a redistribution in 2013, it has covered an area of 79.25 square kilometres and includes the localities of Berkeley, Coachwood Park, Coniston, Cordeaux Heights, Corrimal, Cringila, Fairy Meadow, Farmborough Chase, Farmborough Heights, Figtree, Gwynneville, Kembla Grange, Kembla Heights, Kemblawarra, Lake Heights, Lindsay Heights, Mangerton, Mount Kembla, Mount Saint Thomas, North Wollongong, Port Kembla, Primbee, Spring Hill, Towradgi, Unanderra, Warrawong, West Wollongong, Windang, Wollongong.

In August 2016, Noreen Hay resigned from the Legislative Assembly triggering a third by-election to be held on 12 November 2016, the other two being Canterbury and Orange. Scully won the by-election, retaining the seat for the Labor party.

== History ==
Wollongong was created in 1904, replacing parts of Woronora and Illawarra. In 1920, with the introduction of proportional representation, it was absorbed into Wollondilly, along with Allowrie. In 1927, with the abolition of proportional representation, it was recreated, along with a new Illawarra electorate. In 1930, it was replaced by Bulli. In 1941, a new electorate of Wollongong-Kembla was created. This was split into Wollongong and Kembla in 1968. Wollongong has rarely been won by the right wing Liberal party and in recent decades has become one of Labor's safest seats.

== Members for Wollongong ==
First incarnation (1904–1920)
Member	Party	Term
John Nicholson	Labour	1904–1916
John Nicholson	Nationalist	1916–1917
Billy Davies	Labor	1917–1920
Second incarnation (1927–1930)
Member	Party	Term
Billy Davies	Labor	1927–1930
Third incarnation (1968–present)
Member	Party	Term
Jack Hough	Liberal	1968–1971
Eric Ramsay	Labor	1971–1984
Frank Arkell	Independent	1984–1991
Gerry Sullivan	Labor	1991–1999
Col Markham	Labor	1999–2003
Noreen Hay	Labor	2003–2016
Paul Scully	Labor	2016–present

== Election results ==
2023 New South Wales state election: Wollongong
Party	Candidate	Votes	%	±%
Labor	Paul Scully	27,723	56.5	+4.9
Liberal	Joel Johnson	10,776	22.0	+0.8
Greens	Cath Blakey	8,216	16.7	+3.4
Animal Justice	Kristen Nelson	2,347	4.8	+2.3
Total formal votes		49,062	96.1	+0.5
Informal votes		2,011	3.9	−0.5
Turnout		51,073	86.8	−1.6
Two-party-preferred result
Labor	Paul Scully	33,962	74.3	+1.5
Liberal	Joel Johnson	11,727	25.7	−1.5
Labor hold		Swing	+1.5	
