= Eddie Graham (politician) =

Australian politician

The Honourable Eddie Graham

Minister for Agriculture
- In office 8 June 1944 – 13 November 1957
- Preceded by: Bill Dunn
- Succeeded by: Roger Nott

Personal details
- Born: 19 January 1897 Wagga Wagga, New South Wales
- Died: 13 November 1957 (aged 60) Wagga Wagga, New South Wales
- Party: Labor Party

Edgar Hugh Graham (19 January 1897 – 13 November 1957) was an Australian politician and a member of the New South Wales Legislative Assembly from 1941 until his death . He was a member of the Labor Party and held numerous ministerial positions. He was the Minister for Agriculture for 13 years.

Graham was born in Wagga Wagga, New South Wales and was the son of a farmer. He was educated to elementary level at state schools and initially worked as a butcher. He later worked as a stock agent and pig breeder. Graham was elected to the New South Wales Parliament as the Labor member for Wagga Wagga at the 1941 state election. He defeated the sitting Country Party member, Matthew Kilpatrick in the landslide victory that allowed William McKell to form a government. He held the seat at the next five elections and died as the sitting member in 1957. During the premierships of McKell, James McGirr and Joseph Cahill, Graham held various ministerial portfolios, most notably his long tenure as Minister for Agriculture.

New South Wales Legislative Assembly
Preceded by Matthew Kilpatrick	Member for Wagga Wagga; 1941 – 1957	Succeeded by Wal Fife
Political offices
Preceded by Bill Dunn	Minister for Agriculture; 1944 – 1957	Succeeded by Roger Nott
New title	Minister for Food Production; 1953 – 1957	Succeeded by Roger Nott
