= 2016 Canterbury state by-election =

Election result for Canterbury, New South Wales, Australia

- 12 November 2016

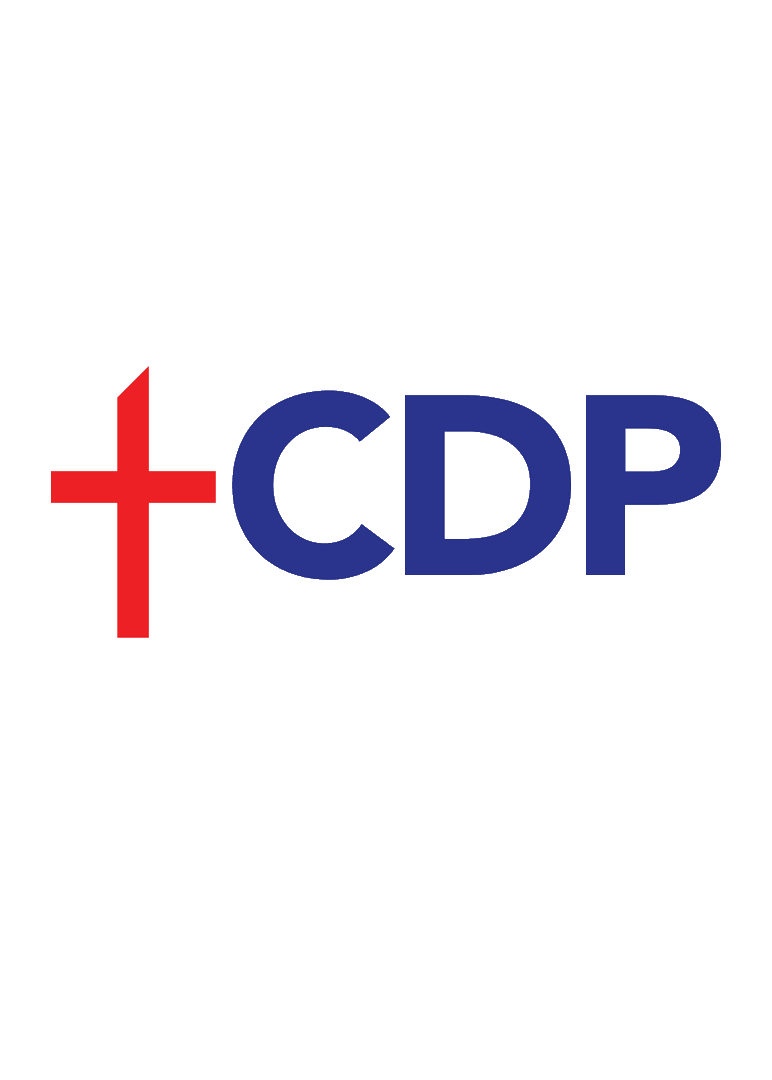

| | First party | Second party | Third party |
|---|---|---|---|
| Candidate | Sophie Cotsis | Branka Kouroushis | Kristian Bodell |
| Party | Labor | Christian Democrats | Greens |
| Popular vote | 27,993 | 8,397 | 6,393 |
| Percentage | 65.5% | 19.6% | 14.9% |
| Swing | ▲15.2pp | ▲9.4pp | ▲5.3pp |
| TPP | 77.8% | 22.2% |
| TPP swing | ▲12.1pp | ▲22.2pp |
MP before election
Linda Burney
Labor
Elected MP
Sophie Cotsis
Labor

A by-election for the seat of Canterbury in the New South Wales Legislative Assembly was held on 12 November 2016. The by-election was triggered by the resignation of Labor MP and former interim Labor leader Linda Burney on 6 May to contest the division of Barton at the 2016 federal election.

By-elections for the seats of Orange and Wollongong were held on the same day.

== Background ==
In its second incarnation from 1927, the electoral district of Canterbury has been held by the Labor Party, excepting between 1932 and 1935 when Edward Hocking held the seat for the United Australia Party following the Lang dismissal crisis.

Linda Burney was elected to represent Canterbury at the 2003 state election, becoming the first Aboriginal person to serve in the New South Wales Parliament. Burney was most recently re-elected to the seat at the 2015 state election with a margin of 15.7, making Canterbury a safe seat for the Labor Party. On 29 February 2016, Burney indicated that she would be seeking preselection for the federal seat of Barton in the upcoming federal election, and would resign from the assembly if successful. In March, the NSW branch of the Labor Party referred the preselection decisions for the federal seats of Barton and Hunter, and Canterbury, to the party's national executive. Sophie Cotsis, a member of the Legislative Council since 2010, was preselected.

== Dates ==
| Date | Event |
|---|---|
| 23 September 2016 | Writ of election issued by the Speaker of the Legislative Assembly and close of electoral rolls. |
| 27 October 2016 | Close of nominations for candidates |
| 12 November 2016 | Polling day, between the hours of 8 am and 6 pm |
| 25 November 2016 | Return of writ |

== Candidates ==
The three candidates in ballot paper order are as follows:

Candidate nominations
| Party | Candidate | Notes (not on ballot paper) |
|---|---|---|
| Christian Democratic Party (Fred Nile Group) | Branka Kouroushis | Migrated from Montenegro in 1992. Currently studying counselling and community service work. |
| The Greens | Kristian Bodell | Solicitor specialising in personal injury law. |
| Labor | Sophie Cotsis | Member of the New South Wales Legislative Council from 2010 to 2016. |

== Results ==
2016 Canterbury by-election Saturday 12 November
| Party | Candidate | Votes | % | ±% |
|---|---|---|---|---|
| Labor | Sophie Cotsis | 27,993 | 65.5 | +15.2 |
| Christian Democrats | Branka Kouroushis | 8,397 | 19.6 | +9.4 |
| Greens | Kristian Bodell | 6,393 | 14.9 | +5.3 |
| Total formal votes | | 42,783 | 95.4 | +0.2 |
| Informal votes | | 2,075 | 4.6 | −0.2 |
| Turnout | | 44,858 | 78.5 | −15.9 |
Two-candidate-preferred result
| Labor | Sophie Cotsis | 31,866 | 77.8 | +12.1 |
| Christian Democrats | Branka Kouroushis | 9,092 | 22.2 | +22.2 |
| Labor hold | | Swing | N/A | |

== See also ==
- Electoral results for the district of Canterbury
- List of New South Wales state by-elections
