= Electoral district of Wagga Wagga =

State electoral district of New South Wales, Australia

Wagga Wagga New South Wales—Legislative Assembly
- Interactive map of district boundaries from the 2023 state election
- State: New South Wales
- Dates current: 1894–1904; 1913–1920; 1927–present
- MP: Joe McGirr
- Party: Independent
- Namesake: Wagga Wagga
- Electors: 57,413 (2023)
- Area: 12,108.11 km^{2} (4,675.0 sq mi)
- Demographic: Provincial and rural
Electorates around Wagga Wagga:
| Cootamundra | Cootamundra | Goulburn |
| Albury | Wagga Wagga | Australian Capital Territory |
| Albury | Albury | Monaro |

Wagga Wagga is an electoral district of the Legislative Assembly in the Australian state of New South Wales. The district has been held by Independent MP Joe McGirr since the September 2018 by-election.

Wagga Wagga is a regional electorate. It entirely covers two local government areas: the City of Wagga Wagga and Lockhart Shire. It also covers part of the Snowy Valleys Council, which was established following the merger of Tumut Shire and Tumbarumba Shire.

== History ==
Wagga Wagga was created in 1894. In 1920, Wagga Wagga, Albury and Corowa was absorbed into Murray and elected three members under proportional representation. When proportional representation was replaced by single-member electorates in 1927, Wagga Wagga was recreated, with Matthew Kilpatrick, the Country Party candidate, winning the October election. According to the Wagga Daily Advertiser, it was a decisive vote against the continuance of the Labor government led by Jack Lang.

Labor regained the seat in its 1941 landslide, holding it until the Liberals took it back in 1957. It remained safely Liberal for most of the last half-century, despite being located in the midst of an area considered Country/ National heartland. This tradition was broken in 2018, when longtime Liberal member Daryl Maguire was forced out of politics due to a corruption scandal. At the ensuring by-election, the Liberal primary vote almost halved, allowing independent Joe McGirr to take the seat on 59.6 percent of the two-candidate vote. Although Labor was knocked down to third place on the primary vote, the swing against the Liberals was large enough to make Wagga Wagga a notional Labor seat in a "traditional" two-party matchup with the Liberals.

McGirr retained the seat with an increased majority at the 2019 state election, with the Liberals standing down in favour of the Nationals. Unlike the preceding by-election, the National candidate won the notional "traditional" two-party matchup with Labor.

== Members for Wagga Wagga ==
First incarnation (1894–1904)
| Member | Party | Term |
|---|---|---|
| James Gormly | Protectionist | 1894–1901 |
| James Gormly | Progressive | 1901–1904 |
Second incarnation (1913–1920)
| Member | Party | Term |
| Walter Boston | Labor | 1913–1917 |
| George Beeby | Nationalist | 1917–1920 |
Third incarnation (1927–present)
| Member | Party | Term |
| Matthew Kilpatrick | Country | 1927–1941 |
| Eddie Graham | Labor | 1941–1957 |
| Wal Fife | Liberal | 1957–1975 |
| Joe Schipp | Liberal | 1975–1999 |
| Daryl Maguire | Liberal | 1999–2018 |
| Joe McGirr | Independent | 2018–present |

== Election results ==
2023 New South Wales state election: Wagga Wagga
| Party | Candidate | Votes | % | ±% |
|---|---|---|---|---|
| Independent | Joe McGirr | 21,783 | 44.2 | −1.9 |
| National | Andrianna Benjamin | 7,267 | 14.7 | −11.3 |
| Labor | Keryn Foley | 6,729 | 13.6 | −1.1 |
| Liberal | Julia Ham | 6,526 | 13.2 | +13.2 |
| Shooters, Fishers, Farmers | Christopher Smith | 3,777 | 7.7 | −1.1 |
| Greens | Ray Goodlass | 2,764 | 5.6 | +2.8 |
| Public Education | Raymond Gentles | 464 | 0.9 | +0.9 |
| Total formal votes | | 49,310 | 96.6 | −0.2 |
| Informal votes | | 1,721 | 3.4 | +0.2 |
| Turnout | | 51,031 | 88.9 | −1.5 |
Notional two-party-preferred count
| National | Andrianna Benjamin | 16,287 | 56.2 | −1.3 |
| Labor | Keryn Foley | 12,719 | 43.8 | +1.3 |
Two-candidate-preferred result
| Independent | Joe McGirr | 28,435 | 72.4 | +6.9 |
| National | Andrianna Benjamin | 10,847 | 27.6 | −6.9 |
| Independent hold | | Swing | +6.9 | |
