= Joe Schipp =

Australian politician

The Honourable Joe Schipp OAM

Member of the New South Wales Parliament for Wagga Wagga
- In office 6 December 1975 – 5 March 1999
- Preceded by: Wal Fife
- Succeeded by: Daryl Maguire

Personal details
- Born: Joseph John Schipp; 21 March 1932 Mudgee, New South Wales
- Died: 23 November 2017 (aged 85) Gumly Gumly, New South Wales
- Party: Liberal
- Spouse: Rhonda Lange
- Children: 2

Joseph John Schipp OAM (21 March 1932 – 23 November 2017) was an Australian politician in the New South Wales Government. He was the Liberal member for Wagga Wagga in the New South Wales Legislative Assembly from 1975 to 1999.

== Personal life ==
Schipp was born in Mudgee and named for his father, Joseph William. He attended school at Mudgee, Temora and finally Wagga Wagga before qualifying as a primary school teacher in 1950. He married Rhonda Daisy Lange on 13 November 1954; they had two sons.

== Career ==
In 1973 he joined the Liberal Party, becoming honorary secretary and vice-president of the local branch.

In 1975, the Liberal member for the local state seat of Wagga Wagga, Wal Fife, resigned to contest the corresponding federal seat of Farrer, and Schipp was preselected as the Liberal candidate for the by-election. He was elected easily on Country Party preferences. He was never significantly troubled in his own electorate. In 1988, on the election of the Greiner Coalition Government, he was appointed Minister for Housing. He was moved to Sport, Recreation and Racing in 1992, but was sacked in 1993 by Premier John Fahey.

Schipp retired in 1999. He died on 23 November 2017 at Gumly Gumly, New South Wales, aged 85.

New South Wales Legislative Assembly
Preceded by Wal Fife	Member for Wagga Wagga; 1975–1999	Succeeded by Daryl Maguire
