= Joe McGirr =

Australian politician and physician

Associate Professor Joe McGirr MP
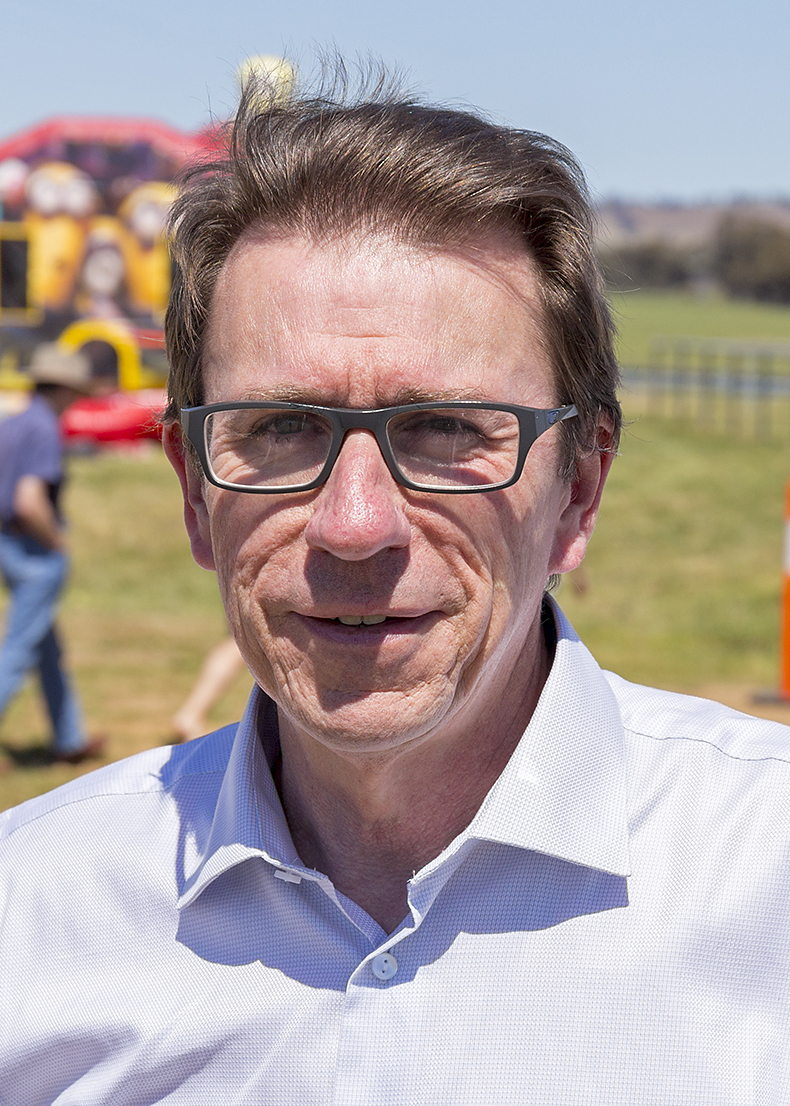

Member of the New South Wales Parliament for Wagga Wagga
- Incumbent
- Assumed office 8 September 2018
- Preceded by: Daryl Maguire

Personal details
- Born: 19 June 1960 (age 65) North Sydney, New South Wales, Australia
- Party: Independent
- Other political affiliations: John Hatton's Independent Team (2011)
- Relatives: Greg McGirr (grandfather); James McGirr (great-uncle); Trixie Gardner (aunt)
- Profession: Medical doctor

Joseph Gregory McGirr (born 19 June 1960) is an Australian independent politician, physician and former associate dean of the University of Notre Dame Australia.

He has been the member for Wagga Wagga in the New South Wales Legislative Assembly since the 2018 by-election. ABC News declared him the winner on 9 September, the day after the election, with the New South Wales Electoral Commission confirming it on 14 September. He came second to the Liberal candidate by only 28 votes after the Liberal primary vote almost halved from 2015, and was elected on Labor preferences. He had previously contested the seat in 2011 and received 30.6% of the first preference vote.

McGirr's grandfather was Greg McGirr, a Labor member of the Legislative Assembly from 1913 to 1925, and Deputy Premier from 1921 to 1922, who was briefly Labor leader in 1923. His great-uncle, James McGirr, was the Premier of New South Wales from 1947 to 1952.

Joe McGirr was re-elected in the 2019 New South Wales state election and the 2023 New South Wales state election.

== See also ==
- Political families of Australia

New South Wales Legislative Assembly
Preceded by Daryl Maguire	Member for Wagga Wagga; 2018–present	Incumbent
