= Paul Scully (Australian politician) =

Australian politician

The Honourable Paul Scully MP
- Scully during the launch of the Sydney Plan in August 2026

Minister for Planning and Public Spaces
- Incumbent
- Assumed office 5 April 2023
- Premier: Chris Minns
- Preceded by: Anthony Roberts (as Minister for Planning)

Member of the New South Wales Legislative Assembly for Wollongong
- Incumbent
- Assumed office 12 November 2016
- Preceded by: Noreen Hay

Personal details
- Born: Wollongong, New South Wales, Australia
- Party: Labor
- Spouse: Alison Byrnes
- Website: www.paulscullymp.com.au

Paul Scully is an Australian politician who has been a member of the New South Wales Legislative Assembly since 12 November 2016, representing the seat of Wollongong for the Labor Party, since the by-election to replace Noreen Hay. He is currently the Minister for Planning and Public Spaces from April 2023.

Before his election, Scully was chief operating officer of the Australian Institute for Innovative Materials at the University of Wollongong. He is married to Alison Byrnes, the member for Cunningham since the 2022 federal election.

New South Wales Legislative Assembly
Preceded by Noreen Hay	Member for Wollongong; 2016–present	Incumbent
