= Noreen Hay =

Australian politician

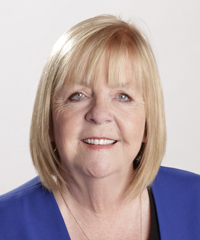

Member of New South Wales Legislative Assembly
- In office 22 March 2003 – 31 August 2016
- Preceded by: Col Markham
- Succeeded by: Paul Scully
- Constituency: Wollongong

Personal details
- Born: 10 March 1951 (age 75) London, England
- Party: Labor Party
- Spouse: (Christoper Hay) Lee Lawler
- Children: Four children
- Occupation: Trade union official, personal care worker

Noreen Hay (born 10 March 1951) is an Australian politician and a former member of the New South Wales Legislative Assembly. She represented Wollongong for the Labor Party from 2003 to 2016. In July 2015, Hay stood down as NSW Opposition whip due to allegations of electoral fraud and branch stacking.

In August 2016, Hay resigned from the NSW Legislative Assembly triggering a by-election.

== Early life ==
Hay was born in London into a working-class family of practising Christians. She was the second eldest of five children to parents Nora and Tadg Herlihy, who had migrated to the United Kingdom from Cork, Ireland. She married Christopher Martin Hay and in 1982 they migrated with their four children to Wollongong, New South Wales.

Hay enrolled in Wollongong TAFE and subsequently found employment with the NSW Home Care Service, caring for the elderly and bedridden in Wollongong's outer suburbs. She became a union official and regional secretary of the Miscellaneous Workers' Union and worked as an electorate officer to Jennie George, the Federal Member for Throsby.

== Political career ==
In 2002, she won ALP preselection from the sitting member, Col Markham, and was the first woman elected for the seat of Wollongong.

Following the 2007 election, Hay was appointed Parliamentary Secretary to Health Minister Reba Meagher. She was stood down in February 2008 by the Premier Iemma being named in an ICAC inquiry into Wollongong Council. Hay was re-appointed in March 2008 after being cleared by the ICAC.

State Premier Nathan Rees dismissed Noreen Hay from her position as Parliamentary Secretary for Health on 12 September 2008 after allegations arose that she participated in simulated mammary intercourse with Police Minister Matt Brown at an office party in June. Both Brown and Hay denied the allegations.

=== Electoral fraud investigation and resignation ===
Hay was re-elected in 2011 and 2015. On 1 July 2015, Australian Federal Police officers raided Hay's electorate office in Wollongong as part of an investigation into alleged branch stacking and electoral fraud connected to her December 2014 preselection ballot. Two days later, Opposition Leader Luke Foley announced that Hay had agreed to stand aside as NSW Opposition whip pending the outcome of the investigation. In May 2016, Hay said she had been advised by her lawyers that she was not a suspect in the AFP inquiry, and she resumed the role of Opposition whip. A former member of Hay's electorate staff was charged , and found guilty of electoral fraud. Hay resigned from Parliament in August of that year citing health concerns and declining to comment further on the fraud investigation. Hay herself was not charged in relation to the matter and had consistently denied any knowledge of the fraudulent conduct.

New South Wales Legislative Assembly
Preceded by Col Markham	Member for Wollongong; 2003–2016	Succeeded by Paul Scully
