= Electoral results for the district of Lachlan =

Election results for Lachlan, New South Wales, Australia

Lachlan, an electoral district of the Legislative Assembly in the Australian state of New South Wales, had four incarnations, from 1859 to 1880, from 1894 to 1920, from 1927 to 1950 and from 1981 to 2007.

Election	Member	Party
1859	John Ryan	None
1860	John Ryan	None
1864	James Martin	None
1869	James Watson	None
1872	James Watson	None
1875	James Watson	None
1877	James Watson	None
1879 by	James Watson	None
Election	Member	Party
1894	James Carroll	Ind. Protectionist
1895	James Carroll	Protectionist
1896 by	James Carroll	Protectionist
1898	James Carroll	Protectionist
1901	James Carroll	Progressive
1904	Andrew Kelly	Labor
1907	Andrew Kelly	Labor
1910	Andrew Kelly	Labor
1913	Thomas Brown	Labor
1917	Ernest Buttenshaw	Nationalist
Election	Member	Party
1927	Ernest Buttenshaw	Country
1930	Ernest Buttenshaw	Country
1932	Ernest Buttenshaw	Country
1935	Ernest Buttenshaw	Country
1938	Griffith Evans	Country
1941	Griffith Evans	Country
1943 by	John Chanter	Labor
1944	John Chanter	Labor
1947	Robert Medcalf	Country
Election	Member	Party
1981	Ian Armstrong	National
1984	Ian Armstrong	National
1988	Ian Armstrong	National
1991	Ian Armstrong	National
1995	Ian Armstrong	National
1999	Ian Armstrong	National
2003	Ian Armstrong	National

== Election results ==
=== Elections in the 2000s ===
==== 2003 ====
2003 New South Wales state election: Lachlan
Party	Candidate	Votes	%	±%
National	Ian Armstrong	26,961	66.0	+10.9
Labor	Stephen Pollard	10,374	25.4	−2.1
One Nation	Russell Constable	1,791	4.4	−8.6
Greens	Jenny McKinnon	1,696	4.2	+2.5
Total formal votes		40,822	98.0	+0.1
Informal votes		814	2.0	−0.1
Turnout		41,636	93.8	
Two-party-preferred result
National	Ian Armstrong	27,830	71.2	+4.9
Labor	Stephen Pollard	11,253	28.8	−4.9
National hold		Swing	+4.9	

=== Elections in the 1990s ===
==== 1999 ====
1999 New South Wales state election: Lachlan
Party	Candidate	Votes	%	±%
National	Ian Armstrong	22,798	55.1	+10.5
Labor	Tony Lord	11,385	27.5	−4.0
One Nation	Wilf Reid	5,383	13.0	+13.0
Democrats	Peter Mulligan	1,124	2.7	+0.6
Greens	Mike Durrant	689	1.7	+1.7
Total formal votes		41,379	98.0	+3.6
Informal votes		854	2.0	−3.6
Turnout		42,233	94.9	
Two-party-preferred result
National	Ian Armstrong	24,940	66.3	−1.0
Labor	Tony Lord	12,680	33.7	+1.0
National hold		Swing	−1.0	

==== 1995 ====
1995 New South Wales state election: Lachlan
Party	Candidate	Votes	%	±%
National	Ian Armstrong	23,560	69.4	+12.8
Labor	Tim Carney	8,578	25.3	−3.0
Democrats	Dave Cox	1,787	5.3	+1.6
Total formal votes		33,925	94.8	+2.2
Informal votes		1,843	5.2	−2.2
Turnout		35,768	95.3	
Two-party-preferred result
National	Ian Armstrong	24,303	72.4	+6.2
Labor	Tim Carney	9,248	27.6	−6.2
National hold		Swing	+6.2	

==== 1991 ====
1991 New South Wales state election: Lachlan
Party	Candidate	Votes	%	±%
National	Ian Armstrong	18,289	56.7	−14.2
Labor	Peter Gordon	9,126	28.3	+0.5
Country Residents	Peter Mallon	2,332	7.2	+7.2
Independent	Colin Wilson	1,355	4.2	+4.2
Democrats	Neil Bartlett	1,176	3.6	+3.6
Total formal votes		32,278	92.7	−5.1
Informal votes		2,544	7.3	+5.1
Turnout		34,822	95.3	
Two-party-preferred result
National	Ian Armstrong	20,197	66.2	−5.8
Labor	Peter Gordon	10,314	33.8	+5.8
National hold		Swing	−5.8	

=== Elections in the 1980s ===
==== 1988 ====
1988 New South Wales state election: Lachlan
Party	Candidate	Votes	%	±%
National	Ian Armstrong	21,451	73.6	+10.0
Labor	Leslie Saunders	7,687	26.4	−7.6
Total formal votes		29,138	97.9	−0.9
Informal votes		624	2.1	+0.9
Turnout		29,762	94.7	
National hold		Swing	+8.3	

==== 1984 ====
1984 New South Wales state election: Lachlan
Party	Candidate	Votes	%	±%
National	Ian Armstrong	19,108	65.9	+7.2
Labor	Tim West	9,885	34.1	−7.2
Total formal votes		28,993	98.8	+1.1
Informal votes		346	1.2	−1.1
Turnout		29,339	93.4	+1.0
National hold		Swing	+7.2	

==== 1981 ====
1981 New South Wales state election: Lachlan
Party	Candidate	Votes	%	±%
National Country	Ian Armstrong	16,538	58.7	+3.8
Labor	Timothy West	11,642	41.3	−3.8
Total formal votes		28,180	97.7	
Informal votes		672	2.3	
Turnout		28,852	92.4	
National Country notional hold		Swing	+3.8	

District recreated

==== 1950 - 1981 ====
District abolished

=== Elections in the 1940s ===
==== 1947 ====
1947 New South Wales state election: Lachlan
Party	Candidate	Votes	%	±%
Labor	John Chanter	4,995	45.8	−27.2
Country	Robert Medcalf	3,981	36.5	+36.5
Liberal	Daniel Clifton	1,755	16.1	+16.1
Independent	Madge Roberts	187	1.7	+1.7
Total formal votes		10,918	98.4	+4.9
Informal votes		173	1.6	−4.9
Turnout		11,091	92.2	+3.0
Two-party-preferred result
Country	Robert Medcalf	5,609	51.4	+51.4
Labor	John Chanter	5,309	48.6	−24.4
Country gain from Labor		Swing	N/A	

==== 1944 ====
1944 New South Wales state election: Lachlan
Party	Candidate	Votes	%	±%
Labor	John Chanter	7,525	73.0	+26.9
Independent Labor	Joseph Sligar	2,780	27.0	+27.0
Total formal votes		10,305	93.5	−5.2
Informal votes		719	6.5	+5.2
Turnout		11,024	89.2	−2.9
Labor gain from Country		Swing	N/A	

- John Chanter had won the seat for Labor at the 1943 Lachlan by-election, and retained it at this election.

==== 1943 by-election ====
1943 Lachlan by-election Saturday 25 September
Party	Candidate	Votes	%	±%
Labor	John Chanter	5,408	56.93	
Country	Lindsay McIvor	2,107	22.18	
Country	John Sommers	1,984	20.89	
Total formal votes		9,499	99.29	
Informal votes		68	0.71	
Turnout		9,567	74.86	
Labor gain from Country		Swing		

Griffith Evans (Country) died.

==== 1941 ====
1941 New South Wales state election: Lachlan
Party	Candidate	Votes	%	±%
Country	Griffith Evans	6,703	53.9	
Labor	George Grintell	5,737	46.1	
Total formal votes		12,440	98.7	
Informal votes		158	1.3	
Turnout		12,598	92.1	
Country hold		Swing		

=== Elections in the 1930s ===
==== 1938 ====
1938 New South Wales state election: Lachlan
Party	Candidate	Votes	%	±%
Labor	John Grace	5,393	39.5	+4.1
Country	Griffith Evans	4,090	30.0	−34.6
Country	John Parker	1,661	12.2	+12.2
Country	Charles Thomas	1,475	10.8	+10.8
Independent	George Berry	1,032	7.6	+7.6
Total formal votes		13,651	97.8	−0.6
Informal votes		306	2.2	+0.6
Turnout		13,957	94.9	+0.2
Two-party-preferred result
Country	Griffith Evans	7,644	56.0	−8.6
Labor	John Grace	6,007	44.0	+8.6
Country hold		Swing	−8.6	

==== 1935 ====
1935 New South Wales state election: Lachlan
Party	Candidate	Votes	%	±%
Country	Ernest Buttenshaw	9,094	64.6	−0.2
Labor (NSW)	Valdimer Connellan	4,978	35.4	+11.2
Total formal votes		14,072	98.4	+0.2
Informal votes		225	1.6	−0.2
Turnout		14,297	94.7	−1.4
Country hold		Swing	N/A	

==== 1932 ====
1932 New South Wales state election: Lachlan
Party	Candidate	Votes	%	±%
Country	Ernest Buttenshaw	8,508	64.8	+8.1
Labor (NSW)	John Heiss	3,173	24.2	−17.5
Federal Labor	David Nilon	1,117	8.5	+8.5
Independent Country	Philip Bolte	337	2.6	+2.6
Total formal votes		13,135	98.2	+0.2
Informal votes		243	1.8	−0.2
Turnout		13,378	96.1	+1.2
Country hold		Swing	N/A	

- Preferences were not distributed.

==== 1930 ====
1930 New South Wales state election: Lachlan
Party	Candidate	Votes	%	±%
Country	Ernest Buttenshaw	7,444	56.7	
Labor	David Tasker	5,743	41.7	
Communist	William Axelby	212	1.6	
Total formal votes		13,129	98.0	
Informal votes		265	2.0	
Turnout		13,394	94.9	
Country hold		Swing		

=== Elections in the 1920s ===
==== 1927 ====
1927 New South Wales state election: Lachlan
Party	Candidate	Votes	%	±%
Country	Ernest Buttenshaw	7,223	60.6	
Labor	Michael Roddy	4,699	39.4	
Total formal votes		11,922	98.5	
Informal votes		183	1.5	
Turnout		12,105	74.6	
Country win		(new seat)		

District recreated

==== 1920 - 1927 ====
District abolished

=== Elections in the 1910s ===
==== 1917 ====
1917 New South Wales state election: Lachlan
Party	Candidate	Votes	%	±%
Nationalist	Ernest Buttenshaw	3,639	52.0	+52.0
Labor	Thomas Brown	3,362	48.0	−2.8
Total formal votes		7,001	98.5	+1.9
Informal votes		103	1.5	−1.9
Turnout		7,104	61.4	−7.1
Nationalist gain from Labor				

==== 1913 ====
1913 New South Wales state election: Lachlan
Party	Candidate	Votes	%	±%
Labor	Thomas Brown	4,009	50.8	
Farmers and Settlers	Arthur Manning (Note: Also endorsed by Liberal Reform.)	3,588	45.4	
Country Party Association	Herbert Bowles	303	3.8	
Total formal votes		7,900	96.6	
Informal votes		275	3.4	
Turnout		8,175	68.5	
Labor hold				

==== 1910 ====
1910 New South Wales state election: The Lachlan
Party	Candidate	Votes	%	±%
Labour	Andrew Kelly	3,050	52.9	
Liberal Reform	William Ewers	2,717	47.1	
Total formal votes		5,766	98.7	
Informal votes		77	1.3	
Turnout		5,843	66.0	
Labour hold				

=== Elections in the 1900s ===
==== 1907 ====
1907 New South Wales state election: The Lachlan
Party	Candidate	Votes	%	±%
Labour	Andrew Kelly	2,726	53.1	
Liberal Reform	James Carroll	2,409	46.9	
Total formal votes		5,135	97.1	
Informal votes		153	2.9	
Turnout		5,288	67.4	
Labour hold				

==== 1904 ====
1904 New South Wales state election: The Lachlan
Party	Candidate	Votes	%	±%
Labour	Andrew Kelly	1,525	36.8	
Liberal Reform	William Ferguson	1,394	33.6	
Independent Liberal	James Carroll	1,230	29.7	
Total formal votes		4,149	99.2	
Informal votes		34	0.8	
Turnout		4,183	63.9	
Labour gain from Progressive				

The Lachlan was one of two seats contested by 3 sitting members. (Note: The two seats contested by 3 sitting members were Ashburnham and The Lachlan.) The district lost parts to Cobar and The Murray and was expanded to absorb part of the abolished seats of Condoublin Grenfell. The member for the Lachlan was James Carroll (Progressive) who stood as Independent Liberal Reform candidate. The member for Condoublin was Patrick Clara (Labour) who unsuccessfully contested Ashburnum. The member for Grenfell was William Holman (Labour) who successfully contested Cootamundra. William Ferguson (Liberal Reform) was the Independent Labour member for Sturt while Andrew Kelly (Labour) was the member for the abolished seat of Sydney-Denison.

==== 1901 ====
1901 New South Wales state election: The Lachlan
Party	Candidate	Votes	%	±%
Progressive	James Carroll	unopposed		
Progressive hold				

=== Elections in the 1890s ===
==== 1898 ====
1898 New South Wales colonial election: The Lachlan
Party	Candidate	Votes	%	±%
National Federal	James Carroll	558	62.9	
Independent Federalist	Alexander Cameron	323	36.4	
Ind. Free Trade	C N Broome	6	0.7	
Total formal votes		887	99.2	
Informal votes		7	0.8	
Turnout		894	46.2	
National Federal hold				

==== 1896 by-election ====
1896 Lachlan by-election Friday 11 September
Party	Candidate	Votes	%	±%
Protectionist	James Carroll	unopposed		
Protectionist hold				

James Carroll (Protectionist) was made bankrupt.

==== 1895 ====
1895 New South Wales colonial election: The Lachlan
Party	Candidate	Votes	%	±%
Protectionist	James Carroll	469	75.0	
Ind. Free Trade	A Skene	146	23.4	
Ind. Free Trade	George Bolton	10	1.6	
Total formal votes		625	98.4	
Informal votes		10	1.6	
Turnout		635	40.3	
Member changed to Protectionist from Ind. Protectionist				

==== 1894 ====
1894 New South Wales colonial election: The Lachlan
Party	Candidate	Votes	%	±%
Ind. Protectionist	James Carroll	452	42.3	
Ind. Protectionist	Alexander Cameron	351	32.9	
Protectionist	John Miller	133	12.5	
Ind. Free Trade	Alexander Huie	119	11.1	
Ind. Free Trade	James Dunsmore	13	1.2	
Total formal votes		1,068	97.8	
Informal votes		24	2.2	
Turnout		1,092	69.3	
Ind. Protectionist win		(new seat)		

District recreated

==== 1880 - 1894 ====
District abolished

=== Elections in the 1870s ===
==== 1879 by-election ====
1879 The Lachlan by-election Friday 10 January
Candidate	Votes	%
James Watson (re-elected)	1,055	54.7
George McLean	873	45.3
Total formal votes	1,928	100.0
Informal votes	0	0.0
Turnout	1,928	37.0

James Watson was appointed Colonial Treasurer in the third Parkes ministry.

==== 1877 ====
1877 New South Wales colonial election: The Lachlan Saturday 3 November
Candidate	Votes	%
James Watson (re-elected)	unopposed	

==== 1875 ====
1874–75 New South Wales colonial election: The Lachlan Tuesday 12 January 1875
Candidate	Votes	%
James Watson (re-elected)	unopposed	
Total formal votes	0	100.0
Informal votes	0	0.0
Turnout	0	0.0

==== 1872 ====
1872 New South Wales colonial election: The Lachlan Saturday 9 March
Candidate	Votes	%
James Watson (re-elected)	1,177	73.4
T R Icely	427	26.6
Total formal votes	1,604	100.0
Informal votes	0	0.0
Turnout	1,604	36.8

=== Elections in the 1860s ===
==== 1869 ====
1869–70 New South Wales colonial election: The Lachlan Tuesday 28 December 1869
Candidate	Votes	%
James Watson (elected)	974	55.6
William Dalley	767	43.8
William Forster	12	0.7
Total formal votes	1,753	97.3
Informal votes	49	2.7
Turnout	1,802	46.7

==== 1864 ====
1864–65 New South Wales colonial election: The Lachlan Wednesday 28 December 1864
Candidate	Votes	%
James Martin (elected)	692	73.4
Andrew Lynch	251	26.6
Total formal votes	943	100.0
Informal votes	0	0.0
Turnout	943	26.3

==== 1860 ====
1860 New South Wales colonial election: The Lachlan Monday 24 December
Candidate	Votes	%
John Ryan (re-elected)	248	57.9
James Martin	180	42.1
Total formal votes	428	98.9
Informal votes	5	1.2
Turnout	433	39.4

=== Elections in the 1850s ===
==== 1859 ====
1859 New South Wales colonial election: The Lachlan Friday 24 June
Candidate	Votes	%
John Ryan (elected)	unopposed	
