= Results of the 1941 New South Wales state election =

State election for New South Wales, Australia in May 1941

New South Wales state election, 10 May 1941 Legislative Assembly << 1938–1944 >>
Enrolled voters	1,684,781 (Note: There were 1,540,974 enrolled voters in contested electorates and 143,807 were enrolled in 7 uncontested electorates (four UAP and three Labor).)				
Votes cast	1,389,896		Turnout	92.52	−3.27
Informal votes	35,858		Informal	2.52	−0.13
Summary of votes by party
Party	Primary votes	%	Swing	Seats	Change
Labor	706,014	50.80	+12.28 (Note: Labor swing includes Industrial Labor which was readmitted into Labor in August 1939.)	54	+ 24
United Australia	281,982	20.29	–15.57	14	–23
Country	153,639	11.05	–2.81	12	–10
State Labor	78,363	5.64	+5.64	0	±0
Ind. United Australia	45,195	3.25	+3.25	5	+5
Independent Labor	29,677	2.14	+2.14	1	+1
New Social Order	8,906	0.64	+0.64	0	±0
Independent Coalition	925	0.07	+0.07	0	±0
Independent	85,195	6.13	–4.75	4	+3
Total	1,389,896			90	

The 1941 New South Wales state election was for 90 electoral districts each returning a single member with compulsory preferential voting.

== Results by electoral district ==
=== Albury ===
1941 New South Wales state election: Albury
Party	Candidate	Votes	%	±%
United Australia	Alexander Mair	6,882	52.5	
Labor	John King	6,235	47.5	
Total formal votes		13,117	99.0	
Informal votes		132	1.0	
Turnout		13,249	91.7	
United Australia hold		Swing		

=== Annandale ===
1941 New South Wales state election: Annandale
Party	Candidate	Votes	%	±%
Labor	Bob Gorman	13,018	75.7	
Independent	Stanley Moran	2,244	13.1	
New Social Order	Harry Blackwell	1,926	11.2	
Total formal votes		17,188	94.3	
Informal votes		1,036	5.7	
Turnout		18,224	90.5	
Labor hold		Swing		

- Preferences were not distributed.

=== Armidale ===
1941 New South Wales state election: Armidale
Party	Candidate	Votes	%	±%
Country	David Drummond	7,192	53.3	
Labor	John Shanahan	6,308	46.7	
Total formal votes		13,500	98.5	
Informal votes		209	1.5	
Turnout		13,709	92.9	
Country hold		Swing		

=== Ashburnham ===
1941 New South Wales state election: Ashburnham
Party	Candidate	Votes	%	±%
Labor	Edgar Dring	7,367	54.6	
Country	Hilton Elliott	6,136	45.4	
Total formal votes		13,503	98.4	
Informal votes		220	1.6	
Turnout		13,723	94.2	
Labor gain from Country		Swing		

=== Ashfield ===
1941 New South Wales state election: Ashfield
Party	Candidate	Votes	%	±%
United Australia	Athol Richardson	11,555	58.5	
Labor	Rex Jones	8,179	41.5	
Total formal votes		19,734	98.1	
Informal votes		389	1.9	
Turnout		20,123	93.1	
United Australia hold		Swing		

=== Auburn ===
1941 New South Wales state election: Auburn
Party	Candidate	Votes	%	±%
Labor	Jack Lang	12,960	69.7	
State Labor	Clarence Campbell	5,645	30.3	
Total formal votes		18,605	94.1	
Informal votes		1,173	5.9	
Turnout		19,778	93.6	
Labor hold		Swing		

=== Balmain ===
1941 New South Wales state election: Balmain
Party	Candidate	Votes	%	±%
Labor	Mary Quirk	11,427	60.6	
State Labor	Walter Evans	4,879	25.9	
Independent	Malinda Ivey	1,138	6.0	
Independent	Leslie Shiels	732	3.9	
Independent Labor	Arthur Doughty	672	3.6	
Total formal votes		18,848	95.2	
Informal votes		946	4.8	
Turnout		19,794	93.7	
Labor hold		Swing		

- Preferences were not distributed.

=== Bankstown ===
1941 New South Wales state election: Bankstown
Party	Candidate	Votes	%	±%
Labor	James McGirr	10,953	54.7	
Independent	Percy Coleman	5,343	26.7	
State Labor	Morris Hughes	2,873	14.4	
New Social Order	Jack Edwards	855	4.3	
Total formal votes		20,024	96.5	
Informal votes		731	3.5	
Turnout		20,755	93.1	
Labor hold		Swing		

- Preferences were not distributed.

=== Barwon ===
1941 New South Wales state election: Barwon
Party	Candidate	Votes	%	±%
Labor	Roy Heferen	8,192	57.8	
Country	Favel Satterthwaite	5,983	42.2	
Total formal votes		14,175	98.9	
Informal votes		150	1.1	
Turnout		14,325	92.4	
Labor gain from Country		Swing		

=== Bathurst ===
1941 New South Wales state election: Bathurst
Party	Candidate	Votes	%	±%
Labor	Gus Kelly	unopposed		
Labor hold				

=== Blacktown ===
1941 New South Wales state election: Blacktown
Party	Candidate	Votes	%	±%
Labor	Frank Hill	10,909	57.5	
United Australia	Arthur Francis	8,069	42.5	
Total formal votes		18,978	97.2	
Informal votes		549	2.8	
Turnout		19,527	93.1	
Labor notional hold		Swing		

=== Bondi ===
1941 New South Wales state election: Bondi
Party	Candidate	Votes	%	±%
Labor	Abe Landa	9,577	45.1	
United Australia	Norman Thomas	9,373	44.2	
State Labor	Allan Jenkins	2,267	10.7	
Total formal votes		21,217	98.5	
Informal votes		327	1.5	
Turnout		21,544	91.5	
Two-party-preferred result
Labor	Abe Landa	11,492	54.2	
United Australia	Norman Thomas	9,725	45.8	
Labor gain from United Australia		Swing		

=== Botany ===
1941 New South Wales state election: Botany
Party	Candidate	Votes	%	±%
Labor	Bob Heffron	14,312	76.0	
Independent Labor	Addison Brittain	4,526	24.0	
Total formal votes		18,838	94.3	
Informal votes		1,129	5.7	
Turnout		19,967	92.3	
Member changed to Labor from Industrial Labor				

=== Bulli ===
1941 New South Wales state election: Bulli
Party	Candidate	Votes	%	±%
Labor	John Sweeney	9,308	74.7	
State Labor	Alfred Burgess	3,157	25.3	
Total formal votes		12,556	94.2	
Informal votes		676	5.8	
Turnout		13,232	93.0	
Labor hold		Swing		

=== Burwood ===
1941 New South Wales state election: Burwood
Party	Candidate	Votes	%	±%
Labor	Albert Thompson	7,950	38.9	
Ind. United Australia	Gordon Jackett	6,620	32.4	
United Australia	Harrie Mitchell	5,882	28.8	
Total formal votes		20,452	98.1	
Informal votes		386	1.9	
Turnout		20,838	93.7	
Two-candidate-preferred result
Ind. United Australia	Gordon Jackett	11,997	58.7	
Labor	Albert Thompson	8,455	41.3	
Ind. United Australia gain from United Australia		Swing		

=== Byron ===
1941 New South Wales state election: Byron
Party	Candidate	Votes	%	±%
Country	Arthur Budd	7,867	56.1	
Independent	Frederick Stuart	6,157	43.9	
Total formal votes		14,004	97.2	
Informal votes		405	2.8	
Turnout		14,429	93.4	
Country hold		Swing		

=== Canterbury ===
1941 New South Wales state election: Canterbury
Party	Candidate	Votes	%	±%
Labor	Arthur Tonge	15,782	78.0	
New Social Order	William Brandon	2,804	13.9	
State Labor	William Hortin	1,639	8.1	
Total formal votes		20,225	94.2	
Informal votes		1,234	5.8	
Turnout		21,459	94.8	
Labor hold		Swing		

- Preferences were not distributed.

=== Casino ===
1941 New South Wales state election: Casino
Party	Candidate	Votes	%	±%
Country	John Reid	6,468	47.6	
Labor	Denis Holmes	4,494	33.1	
Independent	Robert Carr	2,630	19.4	
Total formal votes		13,592	98.3	
Informal votes		230	1.7	
Turnout		13,822	92.8	
Two-party-preferred result
Country	John Reid	8,285	60.9	
Labor	Denis Holmes	5,307	39.1	
Country hold		Swing		

=== Castlereagh ===
1941 New South Wales state election: Castlereagh
Party	Candidate	Votes	%	±%
Labor	Jack Renshaw	6,563	49.2	
Country	Harold Campbell	5,278	39.6	
Independent Labor	John Smithers	1,497	11.2	
Total formal votes		13,338	98.6	
Informal votes		185	1.4	
Turnout		13,523	91.2	
Two-party-preferred result
Labor	Jack Renshaw	7,899	59.2	
Country	Harold Campbell	5,439	40.8	
Labor gain from Country		Swing		

The sitting member for Castlereagh, Alfred Yeo (Country), was concerned that the redistribution had made it a Labor seat and he unsuccessfully contested Liverpool Plains.

=== Cessnock ===
1941 New South Wales state election: Cessnock
Party	Candidate	Votes	%	±%
Labor	Jack Baddeley	13,559	68.0	
State Labor	George McGregor	6,370	32.0	
Total formal votes		19,929	97.8	
Informal votes		453	2.2	
Turnout		20,382	94.9	
Labor hold		Swing		

=== Clarence ===
1941 New South Wales state election: Clarence
Party	Candidate	Votes	%	±%
Country	Cecil Wingfield	10,712	75.3	
Independent	John Cain	3,509	24.7	
Total formal votes		14,221	98.2	
Informal votes		266	1.8	
Turnout		14,487	93.7	
Country hold		Swing		

=== Cobar ===
1941 New South Wales state election: Cobar
Party	Candidate	Votes	%	±%
Labor	Mat Davidson	10,003	84.4	
State Labor	David Wight	1,843	15.6	
Total formal votes		11,846	97.0	
Informal votes		366	3.0	
Turnout		12,212	84.4	
Labor hold		Swing		

=== Concord ===
1941 New South Wales state election: Concord
Party	Candidate	Votes	%	±%
Labor	Bill Carlton	8,982	45.7	
United Australia	Stan Lloyd	7,984	40.7	
State Labor	Rupert Lockwood	2,671	13.6	
Total formal votes		19,637	98.1	
Informal votes		371	1.9	
Turnout		20,008	93.4	
Two-party-preferred result
Labor	Bill Carlton	11,130	56.7	
United Australia	Stan Lloyd	8,507	43.3	
Labor gain from United Australia		Swing		

=== Coogee ===
1941 New South Wales state election: Coogee
Party	Candidate	Votes	%	±%
Labor	Lou Cunningham	11,341	56.0	
United Australia	Thomas Mutch	8,922	44.0	
Total formal votes		20,263	98.3	
Informal votes		357	1.7	
Turnout		20,620	91.4	
Labor gain from United Australia		Swing		

=== Cook's River ===
1941 New South Wales state election: Cook's River
Party	Candidate	Votes	%	±%
Labor	Joseph Cahill	13,616	73.9	
Independent Labor	John Simpson	4,804	26.1	
Total formal votes		18,420	95.5	
Informal votes		877	4.5	
Turnout		19,297	94.0	
Labor notional hold		Swing		

=== Corowa ===
1941 New South Wales state election: Corowa
Party	Candidate	Votes	%	±%
Independent	Christopher Lethbridge	7,496	63.4	
Country	James Smith	4,324	36.6	
Total formal votes		11,820	98.2	
Informal votes		210	1.8	
Turnout		12,030	88.2	
Independent hold		Swing		

=== Croydon ===
1941 New South Wales state election: Croydon
Party	Candidate	Votes	%	±%
United Australia	David Hunter	11,074	57.0	
Labor	Daniel Murphy	8,342	43.0	
Total formal votes		19,416	97.2	
Informal votes		554	2.8	
Turnout		19,970	93.1	
United Australia hold		Swing		

=== Drummoyne ===
1941 New South Wales state election: Drummoyne
Party	Candidate	Votes	%	±%
United Australia	John Lee	8,693	44.5	
Labor	Robert Greig	8,477	43.4	
State Labor	William Wood	2,367	12.1	
Total formal votes		19,537	98.3	
Informal votes		335	1.7	
Turnout		19,872	93.8	
Two-party-preferred result
Labor	Robert Greig	10,429	53.4	
United Australia	John Lee	9,108	46.6	
Labor gain from United Australia		Swing		

=== Dubbo ===
1941 New South Wales state election: Dubbo
Party	Candidate	Votes	%	±%
Country	George Wilson	6,517	48.1	
Labor	Clarence Robertson	5,123	37.8	
Independent Labor	Frank Wilkins	1,897	14.0	
Total formal votes		13,537	98.6	
Informal votes		197	1.4	
Turnout		13,734	93.0	
Two-party-preferred result
Country	George Wilson	6,898	51.0	
Labor	Clarence Robertson	6,639	49.0	
Country hold		Swing		

=== Dulwich Hill ===
1941 New South Wales state election: Dulwich Hill
Party	Candidate	Votes	%	±%
Labor	George Weir	11,370	56.9	
United Australia	Guy Arkins	8,604	43.1	
Total formal votes		19,974	98.2	
Informal votes		363	1.8	
Turnout		20,337	93.5	
Labor gain from United Australia		Swing		

=== Georges River ===
1941 New South Wales state election: Georges River
Party	Candidate	Votes	%	±%
Labor	Arthur Williams	12,417	57.5	
United Australia	Cecil Monro	9,190	42.5	
Total formal votes		21,607	98.2	
Informal votes		383	1.8	
Turnout		22,000	94.1	
Labor gain from United Australia		Swing		

=== Gloucester ===
1941 New South Wales state election: Gloucester
Party	Candidate	Votes	%	±%
United Australia	Charles Bennett	4,494	33.1	
Labor	William Morgan	3,735	27.5	
Independent	Ray Fitzgerald	3,321	24.5	
Independent	Robert Bruce	2,031	14.9	
Total formal votes		13,581	99.1	
Informal votes		124	0.9	
Turnout		13,705	94.9	
Two-candidate-preferred result
Independent	Ray Fitzgerald	6,999	51.5	
United Australia	Charles Bennett	6,582	48.5	
Independent gain from United Australia		Swing		

=== Gordon ===
1941 New South Wales state election: Gordon
Party	Candidate	Votes	%	±%
United Australia	Harry Turner	unopposed		
United Australia hold				

=== Goulburn ===
1941 New South Wales state election: Goulburn
Party	Candidate	Votes	%	±%
Labor	Jack Tully	8,917	60.5	
United Australia	George Ardill	5,520	37.4	
Independent	Cecil Gray	306	2.1	
Total formal votes		14,743	98.8	
Informal votes		171	1.2	
Turnout		14,914	94.9	
Labor hold		Swing		

=== Granville ===
1941 New South Wales state election: Granville
Party	Candidate	Votes	%	±%
Labor	Bill Lamb	13,282	67.9	
United Australia	Claude Fleck	5,392	27.6	
Independent	Sam Aarons	876	4.5	
Total formal votes		19,550	98.5	
Informal votes		303	1.5	
Turnout		19,853	93.9	
Labor hold		Swing		

=== Hamilton ===
1941 New South Wales state election: Hamilton
Party	Candidate	Votes	%	±%
Labor	Joshua Arthur	17,944	84.9	
Independent	Arthur Clarke	3,200	15.1	
Total formal votes		21,144	96.7	
Informal votes		730	3.3	
Turnout		21,874	94.1	
Labor hold		Swing		

=== Hartley ===
1941 New South Wales state election: Hartley
Party	Candidate	Votes	%	±%
Labor	Hamilton Knight	11,437	83.3	
State Labor	James Starling	2,298	16.7	
Total formal votes		13,735	96.4	
Informal votes		512	3.6	
Turnout		14,247	94.6	
Labor hold		Swing		

=== Hawkesbury ===
1941 New South Wales state election: Hawkesbury
Party	Candidate	Votes	%	±%
Labor	Frank Finnan	6,453	43.0	
United Australia	Arthur Brown	5,718	38.1	
Ind. United Australia	Charles Staples	2,841	18.9	
Total formal votes		15,012	98.7	
Informal votes		195	1.3	
Turnout		15,207	92.9	
Two-party-preferred result
Labor	Frank Finnan	7,571	50.4	
United Australia	Arthur Brown	7,441	49.6	
Labor gain from United Australia		Swing		

=== Hornsby ===
1941 New South Wales state election: Hornsby
Party	Candidate	Votes	%	±%
United Australia	Wilfred Frances	7,509	40.7	
Ind. United Australia	Sydney Storey	7,216	39.1	
Independent	Albert French	3,743	20.3	
Total formal votes		18,468	95.4	
Informal votes		886	4.6	
Turnout		19,354	90.7	
Two-candidate-preferred result
Ind. United Australia	Sydney Storey	9,249	50.1	
United Australia	Wilfred Frances	9,219	49.9	
Ind. United Australia gain from United Australia		Swing		

=== Hurstville ===
1941 New South Wales state election: Hurstville
Party	Candidate	Votes	%	±%
Labor	Clive Evatt	14,764	67.7	
United Australia	Roland Murray	7,042	32.3	
Total formal votes		21,806	98.4	
Informal votes		354	1.6	
Turnout		22,160	95.1	
Labor hold		Swing		

=== Illawarra ===
1941 New South Wales state election: Illawarra
Party	Candidate	Votes	%	±%
Labor	Howard Fowles	7,321	56.4	
United Australia	Clarence Faulkner	5,654	43.6	
Total formal votes		12,975	98.1	
Informal votes		249	1.9	
Turnout		13,224	93.1	
Labor hold		Swing		

=== King ===
1941 New South Wales state election: King
Party	Candidate	Votes	%	±%
Labor	Daniel Clyne	11,025	63.0	
State Labor	Albert Sloss	6,488	37.0	
Total formal votes		17,513	93.9	
Informal votes		1,137	6.1	
Turnout		18,650	84.6	
Labor hold		Swing		

=== Kogarah ===
1941 New South Wales state election: Kogarah
Party	Candidate	Votes	%	±%
Labor	William Currey	10,484	48.8	
United Australia	James Ross	9,581	44.6	
State Labor	Paul Mortier	1,400	6.5	
Total formal votes		21,465	98.6	
Informal votes		311	1.4	
Turnout		311	1.4	
Two-party-preferred result
Labor	William Currey	11,741	54.7	
United Australia	James Ross	9,724	45.3	
Labor gain from United Australia		Swing		

=== Kurri Kurri ===
1941 New South Wales state election: Kurri Kurri
Party	Candidate	Votes	%	±%
Labor	George Booth	unopposed		
Labor hold				

=== Lachlan ===
1941 New South Wales state election: Lachlan
Party	Candidate	Votes	%	±%
Country	Griffith Evans	6,703	53.9	
Labor	George Grintell	5,737	46.1	
Total formal votes		12,440	98.7	
Informal votes		158	1.3	
Turnout		12,598	92.1	
Country hold		Swing		

=== Lakemba ===
1941 New South Wales state election: Lakemba
Party	Candidate	Votes	%	±%
Labor	Fred Stanley	14,390	71.1	
New Social Order	William Dowe	3,321	16.4	
State Labor	Asa North	2,532	12.5	
Total formal votes		20,243	95.8	
Informal votes		882	4.2	
Turnout		21,125	93.9	
Labor hold		Swing		

- Preferences were not distributed.

=== Lane Cove ===
1941 New South Wales state election: Lane Cove
Party	Candidate	Votes	%	±%
United Australia	Herbert FitzSimons	9,669	46.8	
Labor	Arthur Treble	9,652	46.7	
Independent	Arthur Russell	1,337	6.5	
Total formal votes		20,658	98.3	
Informal votes		359	1.7	
Turnout		21,017	93.5	
Two-party-preferred result
United Australia	Herbert FitzSimons	10,523	50.9	
Labor	Arthur Treble	10,135	49.1	
United Australia hold		Swing		

=== Leichhardt ===
1941 New South Wales state election: Leichhardt
Party	Candidate	Votes	%	±%
Labor	Claude Matthews	14,964	83.1	
State Labor	Anthony Bellanto	3,034	16.9	
Total formal votes		17,998	93.6	
Informal votes		1,230	6.4	
Turnout		19,228	92.5	
Labor hold		Swing		

=== Lismore ===
1941 New South Wales state election: Lismore
Party	Candidate	Votes	%	±%
Country	William Frith	5,728	40.2	
Labor	Jim Fredericks	4,439	31.1	
Independent	Edward Thorncroft	3,161	22.2	
Independent	David Harrison	925	6.5	
Total formal votes		14,253	99.1	
Informal votes		123	0.9	
Turnout		14,376	93.5	
Two-party-preferred result
Country	William Frith	8,764	61.5	
Labor	Jim Fredericks	5,489	38.5	
Country hold		Swing		

=== Liverpool Plains ===
1941 New South Wales state election: Liverpool Plains
Party	Candidate	Votes	%	±%
Labor	Roger Nott	6,169	50.6	
Country	James Scott	2,080	17.1	
Country	Alister McMullin	1,978	16.2	
Country	Alfred Yeo	1,956	16.1	
Total formal votes		12,183	98.1	
Informal votes		239	1.9	
Turnout		12,422	93.3	
Labor gain from Country		Swing		

- Preferences were not distributed.

The sitting member Harry Carter (Country) retired. Alfred Yeo (Country) was the sitting member for Castlereagh.

=== Maitland ===
1941 New South Wales state election: Maitland
Party	Candidate	Votes	%	±%
United Australia	Walter Howarth	6,934	50.5	
Labor	William Lindsay	6,798	49.5	
Total formal votes		13,732	98.7	
Informal votes		180	1.3	
Turnout		13,912	96.0	
United Australia hold		Swing		

=== Manly ===
1941 New South Wales state election: Manly
Party	Candidate	Votes	%	±%
United Australia	Alfred Reid	10,483	47.9	
Labor	James Dunn	7,470	34.1	
Independent	Vincent Brady	3,942	18.0	
Total formal votes		21,895	98.2	
Informal votes		390	1.8	
Turnout		22,285	90.4	
Two-party-preferred result
United Australia	Alfred Reid	13,124	59.9	
Labor	James Dunn	8,771	40.1	
United Australia hold		Swing		

=== Marrickville ===
1941 New South Wales state election: Marrickville
Party	Candidate	Votes	%	±%
Labor	Carlo Lazzarini	unopposed		
Member changed to Labor from Industrial Labor				

=== Monaro ===
1941 New South Wales state election: Monaro
Party	Candidate	Votes	%	±%
Labor	John Seiffert	6,852	50.7	
Country	William Hedges	6,671	49.3	
Total formal votes		13,523	99.0	
Informal votes		135	1.0	
Turnout		13,658	94.5	
Labor gain from Country		Swing		

=== Mosman ===
1941 New South Wales state election: Mosman
Party	Candidate	Votes	%	±%
Ind. United Australia	Donald Macdonald	12,158	59.4	
United Australia	Herbert Lloyd	5,276	25.8	
Labor	Brian Dooley	3,043	14.9	
Total formal votes		20,477	98.9	
Informal votes		227	1.1	
Turnout		20,704	92.3	
Ind. United Australia gain from United Australia		Swing		

- Preferences were not distributed.

=== Mudgee ===
1941 New South Wales state election: Mudgee
Party	Candidate	Votes	%	±%
Labor	Bill Dunn	8,771	69.4	
Independent	Frederick Cooke	3,877	30.6	
Total formal votes		12,648	98.9	
Informal votes		143	1.1	
Turnout		12,791	94.2	
Labor hold		Swing		

=== Murray ===
1941 New South Wales state election: Murray
Party	Candidate	Votes	%	±%
Country	Joe Lawson	6,054	53.8	
Labor	James Lloyd	5,203	46.2	
Total formal votes		11,257	98.7	
Informal votes		144	1.3	
Turnout		11,401	83.3	
Country hold		Swing		

=== Murrumbidgee ===
1941 New South Wales state election: Murrumbidgee
Party	Candidate	Votes	%	±%
Independent Labor	George Enticknap	4,364	34.1	
Labor	Joseph Fitzgerald	3,399	26.6	
Country	George Dixon	2,863	22.4	
Country	John Thorne	1,145	9.0	
Country	John Kelly	1,027	8.0	
Total formal votes		12,798	96.6	
Informal votes		446	3.4	
Turnout		13,244	89.7	
Two-candidate-preferred result
Independent Labor	George Enticknap	7,741	60.5	
Country	George Dixon	5,057	39.5	
Independent Labor gain from Country		Swing		

=== Namoi ===
1941 New South Wales state election: Namoi
Party	Candidate	Votes	%	±%
Labor	Raymond Hamilton	4,387	33.0	
Country	Ernest Batchelor	4,351	32.7	
Independent Labor	Ernest Hogan	2,978	22.4	
Country	George Gilby	1,591	12.0	
Total formal votes		13,307	98.3	
Informal votes		231	1.7	
Turnout		13,538	93.1	
Two-party-preferred result
Labor	Raymond Hamilton	7,016	52.7	
Country	Ernest Batchelor	6,291	47.3	
Labor gain from Country		Swing		

=== Nepean ===
1941 New South Wales state election: Nepean
Party	Candidate	Votes	%	±%
United Australia	Joseph Jackson	7,720	56.4	
Labor	William Mathews	5,955	43.6	
Total formal votes		13,675	98.1	
Informal votes		263	1.9	
Turnout		13,938	92.5	
United Australia hold		Swing		

=== Neutral Bay ===
1941 New South Wales state election: Neutral Bay
Party	Candidate	Votes	%	±%
United Australia	Reginald Weaver	unopposed		
United Australia hold				

=== Newcastle ===
1941 New South Wales state election: Newcastle
Party	Candidate	Votes	%	±%
Labor	Frank Hawkins	16,205	74.8	
Independent	Claude Dalby	2,849	13.1	
State Labor	Charles McCaffrey	2,621	12.1	
Total formal votes		21,675	97.8	
Informal votes		489	2.2	
Turnout		22,164	92.8	
Labor hold		Swing		

- Preferences were not distributed.

=== Newtown ===
1941 New South Wales state election: Newtown
Party	Candidate	Votes	%	±%
Labor	Frank Burke	9,448	51.6	
Independent Labor	Lilian Fowler	5,877	32.1	
State Labor	Andrew Carruthers	2,970	16.2	
Total formal votes		18,295	96.6	
Informal votes		642	3.4	
Turnout		18,937	91.8	
Labor hold		Swing		

- Preferences were not distributed.

=== North Sydney ===
1941 New South Wales state election: North Sydney
Party	Candidate	Votes	%	±%
United Australia	Hubert Primrose	9,112	44.1	
Labor	James Geraghty	9,090	44.0	
State Labor	William Wilson	2,448	11.9	
Total formal votes		20,650	98.1	
Informal votes		399	1.9	
Turnout		21,049	92.0	
Two-party-preferred result
Labor	James Geraghty	11,122	53.9	
United Australia	Hubert Primrose	9,528	46.1	
Labor gain from United Australia		Swing		

=== Orange ===
1941 New South Wales state election: Orange
Party	Candidate	Votes	%	±%
Labor	Bob O'Halloran	6,503	45.7	
United Australia	Alwyn Tonking	6,217	43.6	
State Labor	Joseph Roberts	748	5.3	
Independent	James O'Donnell	475	3.3	
Independent	Leslie Loewenthal	302	2.1	
Total formal votes		14,245	97.5	
Informal votes		359	2.5	
Turnout		14,604	94.5	
Two-party-preferred result
Labor	Bob O'Halloran	7,738	54.3	
United Australia	Alwyn Tonking	6,507	45.7	
Labor gain from United Australia		Swing		

=== Oxley ===
1941 New South Wales state election: Oxley
Party	Candidate	Votes	%	±%
Independent	George Mitchell	7,835	54.3	
United Australia	Lewis Martin	6,589	45.7	
Total formal votes		14,424	98.8	
Informal votes		181	1.2	
Turnout		14,605	94.8	
Independent gain from United Australia		Swing		

=== Paddington ===
1941 New South Wales state election: Paddington
Party	Candidate	Votes	%	±%
Labor	Maurice O'Sullivan	14,124	84.8	
State Labor	George Hales	2,529	15.2	
Total formal votes		16,653	96.2	
Informal votes		648	3.8	
Turnout		17,301	87.8	
Labor hold		Swing		

=== Parramatta ===
1941 New South Wales state election: Parramatta
Party	Candidate	Votes	%	±%
United Australia	George Gollan	10,729	53.8	
Labor	Albert Rowe	9,195	46.2	
Total formal votes		19,924	97.5	
Informal votes		504	2.5	
Turnout		20,428	93.6	
United Australia hold		Swing		

=== Phillip ===
1941 New South Wales state election: Phillip
Party	Candidate	Votes	%	±%
Labor	Tom Shannon	12,689	73.3	
Independent	Diana Gould	2,347	13.5	
State Labor	Tom Morey	2,279	13.2	
Total formal votes		17,315	95.2	
Informal votes		870	4.8	
Turnout		18,185	87.6	
Labor hold		Swing		

- Preferences were not distributed.

=== Raleigh ===
1941 New South Wales state election: Raleigh
Party	Candidate	Votes	%	±%
Country	Roy Vincent	5,609	38.0	
Labor	John Howard	5,305	35.9	
Country	Les Jordan	3,853	26.1	
Total formal votes		14,767	98.5	
Informal votes		221	1.5	
Turnout		14,988	93.6	
Two-party-preferred result
Country	Roy Vincent	8,362	56.6	
Labor	John Howard	6,405	43.4	
Country hold		Swing		

=== Randwick ===
1941 New South Wales state election: Randwick
Party	Candidate	Votes	%	±%
Labor	William Gollan	10,537	51.0	
United Australia	Arthur Moverly	8,547	41.3	
State Labor	Sam Lewis	1,591	7.7	
Total formal votes		20,675	98.4	
Informal votes		331	1.6	
Turnout		21,006	92.5	
Labor gain from United Australia		Swing		

- Preferences were not distributed.

=== Redfern ===
1941 New South Wales state election: Redfern
Party	Candidate	Votes	%	±%
Labor	William McKell	14,299	77.3	
State Labor	Sid Conway	4,201	22.7	
Total formal votes		18,500	96.1	
Informal votes		747	3.9	
Turnout		19,247	92.7	
Labor hold		Swing		

=== Rockdale ===
1941 New South Wales state election: Rockdale
Party	Candidate	Votes	%	±%
Labor	John McGrath	10,995	55.6	
United Australia	George McGuire	7,554	38.2	
State Labor	Reginald Williams	1,222	6.2	
Total formal votes		19,771	97.7	
Informal votes		462	2.3	
Turnout		20,233	93.4	
Labor notional hold		Swing		

- Preferences were not distributed.

=== Ryde ===
1941 New South Wales state election: Ryde
Party	Candidate	Votes	%	±%
Ind. United Australia	James Shand	9,825	46.5	
United Australia	Eric Solomon	5,588	26.5	
Independent	William Elliott	5,434	25.7	
Independent	Howard Miscamble	266	1.3	
Total formal votes		21,113	97.9	
Informal votes		444	2.1	
Turnout		21,557	93.3	
Two-candidate-preferred result
Ind. United Australia	James Shand	14,564	69.0	
United Australia	Eric Solomon	6,549	31.0	
Ind. United Australia gain from United Australia		Swing		

Arthur Williams (Labor) won the seat at the 1940 by-election, but after the re-distribution, chose to contest Georges River instead and Labor did not field a candidate. Eric Solomon was the United Australia member for the abolished seat of Petersham. James Shand was the United Australia member for the abolished seat of Hornsby and had been denied pre-selection.

=== South Coast ===
1941 New South Wales state election: South Coast
Party	Candidate	Votes	%	±%
Independent	Rupert Beale	6,389	50.2	
United Australia	Henry Bate	6,350	49.8	
Total formal votes		12,739	98.5	
Informal votes		187	1.5	
Turnout		12,926	92.8	
Independent gain from United Australia		Swing		

=== Sturt ===
1941 New South Wales state election: Sturt
Party	Candidate	Votes	%	±%
Labor	Ted Horsington	8,188	70.8	
State Labor	Arthur Campbell	3,372	29.2	
Total formal votes		11,560	96.8	
Informal votes		383	3.2	
Turnout		11,943	85.6	
Labor hold		Swing		

=== Tamworth ===
1941 New South Wales state election: Tamworth
Party	Candidate	Votes	%	±%
Ind. United Australia	Bill Chaffey (Note: Bill Chaffey had been elected as a UAP candidate at the 1940 Tamworth by-election. He continued to support the government however declined UAP endorsement for the 1941 election on the basis his support came from the Country Party as well as the UAP.)	6,535	49.6	
Labor	John Lyons	5,145	39.1	
United Australia	William McKnight	1,237	9.4	
Independent	Charles Luckett	258	2.0	
Total formal votes		13,175	98.4	
Informal votes		207	1.6	
Turnout		13,382	94.2	
After distribution of preferences
Ind. United Australia	Bill Chaffey	6,676	50.7	
Labor	John Lyons	5,189	39.4	
United Australia	William McKnight	1,310	9.9	
Member changed to Ind. United Australia from United Australia		Swing		

- Preferences were not distributed to completion.

=== Temora ===
1941 New South Wales state election: Temora
Party	Candidate	Votes	%	±%
Country	Doug Dickson	7,325	53.3	
Labor	Charles Poole	6,409	46.7	
Total formal votes		13,734	98.1	
Informal votes		260	1.9	
Turnout		13,994	92.7	
Country hold		Swing		

=== Tenterfield ===
1941 New South Wales state election: Tenterfield
Party	Candidate	Votes	%	±%
Country	Michael Bruxner	7,797	56.9	
Labor	Edward Ogilvie	5,893	43.1	
Total formal votes		13,690	98.2	
Informal votes		248	1.8	
Turnout		13,938	92.1	
Country hold		Swing		

=== Upper Hunter ===
1941 New South Wales state election: Upper Hunter
Party	Candidate	Votes	%	±%
Country	D'Arcy Rose	7,607	56.0	
Labor	Walter Geraghty	5,969	44.0	
Total formal votes		13,576	98.6	
Informal votes		187	1.4	
Turnout		13,763	94.2	
Country hold		Swing		

=== Vaucluse ===
1941 New South Wales state election: Vaucluse
Party	Candidate	Votes	%	±%
United Australia	Murray Robson	unopposed		
United Australia hold				

=== Wagga Wagga ===
1941 New South Wales state election: Wagga Wagga
Party	Candidate	Votes	%	±%
Labor	Eddie Graham	6,850	49.7	
Country	Matthew Kilpatrick	5,900	42.8	
Independent	Ronald Cuttle	1,027	7.5	
Total formal votes		13,777	98.8	
Informal votes		170	1.2	
Turnout		13,947	92.7	
Two-party-preferred result
Labor	Eddie Graham	7,417	53.8	
Country	Matthew Kilpatrick	6,360	46.2	
Labor gain from Country		Swing		

=== Waratah ===
1941 New South Wales state election: Waratah
Party	Candidate	Votes	%	±%
Labor	Robert Cameron	19,075	86.5	
Independent	Robert Cram	2,970	13.5	
Total formal votes		22,045	97.3	
Informal votes		612	2.7	
Turnout		22,657	95.1	
Labor hold		Swing		

=== Waverley ===
1941 New South Wales state election: Waverley
Party	Candidate	Votes	%	±%
Labor	Clarrie Martin	11,464	57.7	
United Australia	Arnold Lander	6,004	30.2	
State Labor	John Fisher	2,408	12.1	
Total formal votes		19,876	98.2	
Informal votes		357	1.8	
Turnout		20,233	90.9	
Labor hold		Swing		

- Preferences were not distributed.

=== Willoughby ===
1941 New South Wales state election: Willoughby
Party	Candidate	Votes	%	±%
United Australia	Edward Sanders	11,825	59.8	
Labor	Francis Fulton	7,950	40.2	
Total formal votes		19,775	98.2	
Informal votes		363	1.8	
Turnout		20,138	92.7	
United Australia hold		Swing		

=== Wollondilly ===
1941 New South Wales state election: Wollondilly
Party	Candidate	Votes	%	±%
United Australia	Jeff Bate	unopposed		
United Australia hold				

=== Wollongong-Kembla ===
1941 New South Wales state election: Wollongong-Kembla
Party	Candidate	Votes	%	±%
Labor	Billy Davies	11,638	82.3	
State Labor	William Frame	2,511	17.7	
Total formal votes		14,149	95.0	
Informal votes		737	5.0	
Turnout		14,886	93.1	
Labor notional hold		Swing		

=== Woollahra ===
1941 New South Wales state election: Woollahra
Party	Candidate	Votes	%	±%
United Australia	Vernon Treatt	15,010	67.7	
Labor	Jack Wright	7,168	32.3	
Total formal votes		22,178	97.3	
Informal votes		607	2.7	
Turnout		22,785	86.1	
United Australia hold		Swing		

=== Yass ===
1941 New South Wales state election: Yass
Party	Candidate	Votes	%	±%
Labor	Bill Sheahan	7,941	55.5	
Country	Bill Ross	6,363	44.5	
Total formal votes		14,304	99.4	
Informal votes		84	0.6	
Turnout		14,388	94.3	
Labor gain from Country		Swing		

=== Young ===
1941 New South Wales state election: Young
Party	Candidate	Votes	%	±%
Country	Albert Reid	6,561	46.2	
Labor	Fred Cahill	4,579	32.2	
Independent Labor	Stanley Neagle	3,062	21.6	
Total formal votes		14,202	99.3	
Informal votes		97	0.7	
Turnout		14,299	94.4	
Two-party-preferred result
Labor	Fred Cahill	7,431	52.3	
Country	Albert Reid	6,772	47.7	
Labor gain from Country		Swing		

== See also ==
- Candidates of the 1941 New South Wales state election
- Members of the New South Wales Legislative Assembly, 1941–1944
