= Candidates of the 1941 New South Wales state election =

This is a list of candidates for the 1941 New South Wales state election. The election was held on 10 May 1941.

== Retiring members ==
=== United Australia ===
- Bruce Walker (Hawkesbury)

=== Country ===
- Harry Carter (Liverpool Plains)
- Robert Hankinson (Murrumbidgee )
- Colin Sinclair (Namoi)

== Legislative Assembly ==
Sitting members are shown in bold text. Successful candidates are highlighted in the relevant colour.

Electorate	Held by	Labor candidate	Coalition candidate	Other candidates
Albury	United Australia	John King	**Alexander Mair** (UAP)	
Annandale	Labor	**Bob Gorman**		Harry Blackwell (NSO); Stan Moran (Ind)
Armidale	Country	John Shanahan	**David Drummond** (CP)	
Ashburnham	Country	Edgar Dring	**Hilton Elliott** (CP)	
Ashfield	United Australia	Rex Jones	**Athol Richardson** (UAP)	
Auburn	Labor	**Jack Lang**		Clarrie Campbell (SLP)
Balmain	Labor	**Mary Quirk**		Arthur Doughty (Ind Lab); Walter Evans (SLP); Malinda Ivey (Ind); Leslie Shiels (Ind)
Bankstown	Labor	**James McGirr**		Percy Coleman (Ind); Jack Edwards (NSO); Jack Hughes (SLP)
Barwon	Labor	**Roy Heferen**	Favel Satterthwaite (CP)	
Bathurst	Labor	**Gus Kelly**		
Blacktown	New district	Frank Hill	Arthur Francis (UAP)	
Bondi	United Australia	Abe Landa	**Norman Thomas** (UAP)	Allan Jenkins (SLP)
Botany	Labor	**Bob Heffron**		Addison Brittain (Ind Lab)
Bulli	Labor	**John Sweeney**		Alfred Burgess (SLP)
Burwood	United Australia	Albert Thompson	**Harrie Mitchell** (UAP)	Gordon Jackett (Ind UAP)
Byron	Country		**Arthur Budd** (CP)	Frederick Stuart (Ind)
Canterbury	Labor	**Arthur Tonge**		William Brandon (NSO); William Hortin (SLP)
Casino	Country	Denis Holmes	**John Reid** (CP)	Robert Carr (Ind)
Castlereagh	Country	Jack Renshaw	Harold Campbell (CP)	John Smithers (Ind Lab)
Cessnock	Labor	**Jack Baddeley**		George McGregor (SLP)
Clarence	Country		**Cecil Wingfield** (CP)	John Cain (Ind)
Cobar	Labor	**Mat Davidson**		David Wight (SLP)
Concord	United Australia	**Bill Carlton**	**Stan Lloyd** (UAP)	Rupert Lockwood (SLP)
Coogee	United Australia	Lou Cunningham	**Thomas Mutch** (UAP)	
Cook's River	New district	**Joseph Cahill**		John Simpson (Ind Lab)
Corowa	Independent		James Smith (CP)	**Christopher Lethbridge** (Ind)
Croydon	United Australia	Daniel Murphy	**David Hunter** (UAP)	
Drummoyne	United Australia	Robert Greig	**John Lee** (UAP)	Bill Wood (SLP)
Dubbo	Country	Clarrie Robertson	**George Wilson** (CP)	Frank Wilkins (Ind Lab)
Dulwich Hill	Labor	George Weir	**Guy Arkins** (UAP)	
Georges River	United Australia	**Arthur Williams**	**Cecil Monro** (UAP)	
Gloucester	United Australia	William Morgan	**Charles Bennett** (UAP)	Ray Fitzgerald (Ind)
Gloucester	United Australia	William Morgan	**Charles Bennett** (UAP)	Robert Bruce (Ind)
Gordon	United Australia		**Harry Turner** (UAP)	
Goulburn	Labor	**Jack Tully**	**George Ardill** (UAP)	Cecil Gray (Ind)
Granville	Labor	**Bill Lamb**	Claude Fleck (UAP)	Sam Aarons (Ind)
Hamilton	Labor	**Joshua Arthur**		Arthur Clarke (Ind)
Hartley	Labor	**Hamilton Knight**		James Starling (SLP)
Hawkesbury	United Australia	Frank Finnan	Arthur Brown (UAP)	Charles Staples (Ind UAP)
Hornsby	United Australia		Wilfred Francis (UAP)	Sydney Storey (Ind UAP)
Hornsby	United Australia		Wilfred Francis (UAP)	Albert French (Ind)
Hurstville	Labor	**Clive Evatt**	Roland Murray (UAP)	
Illawarra	Labor	Howard Fowles	Clarence Faulkner (UAP)	
King	Labor	**Daniel Clyne**		Albert Sloss (SLP)
Kogarah	United Australia	William Currey	**James Ross** (UAP)	Paul Mortier (SLP)
Kurri Kurri	Labor	**George Booth**		
Lachlan	Country	George Grintell	**Griffith Evans** (CP)	
Lakemba	Labor	**Fred Stanley**		William Dowe (NSO); Asa North (SLP)
Lane Cove	United Australia	Arthur Treble	**Herbert FitzSimons** (UAP)	Arthur Russell (Ind)
Leichhardt	Labor	**Claude Matthews**		Anthony Bellanto (SLP)
Lismore	Country	Jim Fredericks	**William Frith** (CP)	David Harrison (Ind Coal.); Edward Thorncroft (Ind)
Liverpool Plains	Country	Roger Nott	Alister McMullin (CP); James Scott (CP); **Alfred Yeo** (CP)	
Maitland	United Australia	William Lindsay	**Walter Howarth** (UAP)	
Manly	United Australia	James Dunn	**Alfred Reid** (UAP)	Vincent Brady (Ind)
Marrickville	Labor	**Carlo Lazzarini**		
Monaro	Country	John Seiffert	**William Hedges** (CP)	
Mosman	United Australia	Brian Dooley	**Herbert Lloyd** (UAP)	Donald Macdonald (Ind UAP)
Mudgee	Labor	**Bill Dunn**		Frederick Cooke (Ind)
Murray	Country	James Lloyd	**Joe Lawson** (CP)	
Murrumbidgee	Country	Joseph Fitzgerald	George Dixon (CP); John Kelly (CP); John Thorne (CP)	George Enticknap (Ind Lab)
Namoi	Country	Raymond Hamilton	Ernest Batchelor (CP); George Gilby (CP)	Ernest Hogan (Ind Lab)
Nepean	United Australia	William Mathews	**Joseph Jackson** (UAP)	
Neutral Bay	United Australia		**Reginald Weaver** (UAP)	
Newcastle	Labor	**Frank Hawkins**		Claude Dalby (Ind); Charles McCaffrey (SLP)
Newtown	Labor	**Frank Burke**		Andrew Carruthers (SLP); Lilian Fowler (Ind Lab)
North Sydney	United Australia	James Geraghty	**Hubert Primrose** (UAP)	William Wilson (SLP)
Orange	United Australia	Bob O'Halloran	**Alwyn Tonking** (UAP)	Leslie Loewenthal (Ind); James O'Donnell (Ind); Joseph Roberts (SLP)
Oxley	United Australia		**Lewis Martin**	George Mitchell (Ind)
Paddington	Labor	**Maurice O'Sullivan**		George Hale (SLP)
Parramatta	United Australia	Albert Rowe	**George Gollan** (UAP)	
Phillip	Labor	**Tom Shannon**		Diana Gould (Ind); Tom Morey (SLP)
Raleigh	Country	John Howard	**Roy Vincent** (CP)	
Raleigh	Country	John Howard	Les Jordan (CP)	
Randwick	United Australia	William Gollan	**Arthur Moverly** (UAP)	Sam Lewis (SLP)
Redfern	Labor	**William McKell**		Sid Conway (SLP)
Rockdale	New district	John McGrath	George McGuire (UAP)	Reginald Williams (SLP)
Ryde	United Australia		**Eric Solomon** (UAP)	**James Shand** (Ind UAP)
Ryde	United Australia		**Eric Solomon** (UAP)	William Elliott (Ind); Howard Miscamble (Ind)
South Coast	United Australia		**Henry Bate** (UAP)	Rupert Beale (Ind)
Sturt	Labor	**Ted Horsington**		Arthur Campbell (SLP)
Tamworth	United Australia	John Lyons	William McKnight (UAP)	**Bill Chaffey** (Ind UAP)
Tamworth	United Australia	John Lyons	William McKnight (UAP)	Charles Luckett (Ind)
Temora	Country	Charles Poole	**Doug Dickson** (CP)	
Tenterfield	Country	Edward Ogilvie	**Michael Bruxner** (CP)	
Upper Hunter	Country	Walter Geraghty	**D'Arcy Rose** (CP)	
Vaucluse	United Australia		**Murray Robson** (UAP)	
Wagga Wagga	Country	Eddie Graham	**Matthew Kilpatrick** (CP)	Ronald Cuttle (Ind)
Waratah	Labor	**Robert Cameron**		Robert Cram (Ind)
Waverley	Labor	**Clarrie Martin**	Arnold Lander (UAP)	John Fisher (SLP)
Willoughby	United Australia	Francis Fulton	**Edward Sanders** (UAP)	
Wollondilly	United Australia		**Jeff Bate** (UAP)	
Wollongong-Kembla	New district	**Billy Davies**		William Frame (SLP)
Woollahra	United Australia	Jack Wright	**Vernon Treatt** (UAP)	
Yass	Country	Bill Sheahan	**Bill Ross** (CP)	
Young	Country	Fred Cahill	**Albert Reid** (CP)	Stanley Neagle (Ind Lab)

== See also ==
- Members of the New South Wales Legislative Assembly, 1941–1944
