= Members of the New South Wales Legislative Assembly, 1941–1944 =

Members of the New South Wales Legislative Assembly who served in the 33rd parliament held their seats from 1941 to 1944. They were elected at the 1941 state election, and at by-elections. During this term, the opposition United Australia Party merged with the new Commonwealth Party to form the Democratic Party in late 1943. The merger was only at a state level, however; the federal United Australia Party, however, remained intact during this period. The Speaker was Daniel Clyne.

Name	Party	Electorate	Term in office
Joshua Arthur	Labor	Hamilton	1935–1953
Jack Baddeley	Labor	Cessnock	1922–1949
Jeff Bate	United Australia/Democratic	Wollondilly	1938–1949
Jack Beale (Note: South Coast independent MLA Rupert Beale died on 28 September 1942. His son, independent candidate Jack Beale, won the resulting by-election on 14 November.)	Independent	South Coast	1942–1973
Rupert Beale	Independent	South Coast	1941–1942
George Booth	Labor	Kurri Kurri	1925–1960
George Brain (Note: Willoughby UAP MLA Edward Sanders died on 10 July 1943. UAP candidate George Brain won the resulting by-election on 25 September.)	United Australia	Willoughby	1943–1968
Michael Bruxner	Country	Tenterfield	1920–1962
Arthur Budd	Country	Byron	1927–1944
Frank Burke	Labor	Newtown	1917–1944
Fred Cahill	Labor	Young	1941–1959
Joseph Cahill	Labor	Cook's River	1925–1959
Robert Cameron	Labor	Waratah	1927–1956
Bill Carlton	Labor	Concord	1935–1949
Bill Chaffey	Ind. United Australia	Tamworth	1940–1973
John Chanter (Note: Lachlan Country Party MLA Griffith Evans died on 16 August 1943. Labor candidate John Chanter won the resulting by-election on 25 September.)	Labor	Lachlan	1943–1947
Daniel Clyne	Labor	King	1927–1956
Lou Cunningham	Labor	Coogee	1941–1948
William Currey	Labor	Kogarah	1941–1948
Mat Davidson	Labor	Cobar	1918–1949
Billy Davies	Labor	Wollongong-Kembla	1917–1949
Doug Dickson	Country	Temora	1938–1960
Edgar Dring	Labor	Ashburnham	1941–1955
David Drummond	Country	Armidale	1920–1949
Bill Dunn	Labor	Mudgee	1910–1911, 1911–1932, 1935–1950
George Enticknap (Note: Murrumbidgee MLA George Enticknap was elected as an Independent Labor candidate, defeating the endorsed Labor candidate, but was readmitted by the party soon after his election.)	Independent Labor/Labor	Murrumbidgee	1941–1965
Griffith Evans	Country	Lachlan	1938–1943
Clive Evatt	Labor	Hurstville	1939–1959
Frank Finnan	Labor	Hawkesbury	1941–1953
Ray Fitzgerald	Independent	Gloucester	1941–1962
Herbert FitzSimons	United Australia/Democratic	Lane Cove	1930–1944
Howard Fowles	Labor	Illawarra	1941–1968
William Frith	Country	Lismore	1933–1953
James Geraghty	Labor	North Sydney	1941–1953
George Gollan	United Australia/Democratic	Parramatta	1932–1953
William Gollan	Labor	Randwick	1941–1962
Bob Gorman	Labor	Annandale	1933–1950
Eddie Graham	Labor	Wagga Wagga	1941–1957
Robert Greig	Labor	Drummoyne	1920–1927, 1941–1947
Raymond Hamilton	Labor	Namoi	1941–1950
Frank Hawkins	Labor	Newcastle	1935–1968
Roy Heferen	Labor	Barwon	1940–1950
Robert Heffron	Labor	Botany	1930–1968
Frank Hill	Labor	Blacktown	1941–1945
Ted Horsington	Labor	Sturt	1922–1947
Walter Howarth	United Australia/Democratic	Maitland	1932–1956
David Hunter	United Australia/Democratic	Croydon	1940–1976
Gordon Jackett	Ind. United Australia	Burwood	1935–1951
Joseph Jackson	United Australia/Democratic	Nepean	1922–1956
Gus Kelly	Labor	Bathurst	1925–1932, 1935–1967
Hamilton Knight	Labor	Hartley	1927–1947
Bill Lamb	Labor	Granville	1938–1962
Abe Landa	Labor	Bondi	1930–1965
Jack Lang (Note: Auburn MLA Jack Lang was expelled from the Labor Party in 1943 and sat as a Lang Labor candidate thereafter, in the final Lang Labor split. Unlike the previous Labor schisms, however, all of his parliamentary colleagues in this parliament remained in the official Labor Party.)^{[7]}	Labor/Lang Labor	Auburn	1913–1943, 1943–1946
Joe Lawson	Country	Murray	1932–1973
Carlo Lazzarini	Labor	Marrickville	1917–1952
Christopher Lethbridge	Independent	Corowa	1937–1946
Donald Macdonald	Ind. United Australia	Mosman	1941–1947
Alexander Mair	United Australia/Democratic	Albury	1932–1946
Clarrie Martin	Labor	Waverley	1930–1932, 1939–1953
Claude Matthews	Labor	Leichhardt	1934–1954
James McGirr	Labor	Bankstown	1922–1952
John McGrath	Labor	Rockdale	1941–1959
William McKell	Labor	Redfern	1917–1947
George Mitchell	Independent	Oxley	1941–1944
Roger Nott	Labor	Liverpool Plains	1941–1961
Bob O'Halloran	Labor	Orange	1920–1927, 1941–1947
Maurice O'Sullivan	Labor	Paddington	1927–1959
Mary Quirk	Labor	Balmain	1939–1950
Alfred Reid	United Australia/Democratic	Manly	1920–1922, 1925–1945
John Reid	Country	Casino	1930–1953
Jack Renshaw	Labor	Castlereagh	1941–1980
Athol Richardson	United Australia/Democratic	Ashfield	1935–1946, 1946–1952
Clarrie Robertson (Note: Dubbo Country Party MLA George Wilson died on 24 April 1942. Labor candidate Clarrie Robertson won the resulting by-election on 6 June.)	Labor	Dubbo	1942–1950, 1953–1959
Murray Robson	United Australia/Democratic	Vaucluse	1936–1957
D'Arcy Rose	Country	Upper Hunter	1939–1959
Edward Sanders	United Australia	Willoughby	1925–1943
John Seiffert	Labor	Monaro	1941–1965
James Shand	Ind. United Australia	Ryde	1926–1944
Tom Shannon	Labor	Phillip	1927–1954
Bill Sheahan	Labor	Yass	1941–1973
Fred Stanley	Labor	Lakemba	1927–1950
Sydney Storey	Ind. United Australia	Hornsby	1941–1962
John Sweeney	Labor	Bulli	1933–1947
Arthur Tonge	Labor	Canterbury	1926–1932, 1935–1962
Vernon Treatt	United Australia/Democratic	Woollahra	1938–1962
Jack Tully	Labor	Goulburn	1925–1932, 1935–1946
Harry Turner	United Australia/Democratic	Gordon	1937–1952
Roy Vincent	Country	Raleigh	1922–1953
Reginald Weaver	United Australia/Democratic	Neutral Bay	1917–1925, 1927–1945
George Weir	Labor	Dulwich Hill	1941–1953
Arthur Williams	Labor	Georges River	1940–1956
George Wilson	Country	Dubbo	1932–1942
Cecil Wingfield	Country	Clarence	1938–1955

== See also ==
- First McKell ministry
- Results of the 1941 New South Wales state election
- Candidates of the 1941 New South Wales state election
