= Electoral results for the district of Sydney-Denison =

Election results for Sydney-Denison, New South Wales, Australia

Sydney-Denison, an electoral district of the Legislative Assembly in the Australian state of New South Wales, was created in 1894 and abolished in 1904.

Election	Member	Party
1894	(Sir) Matthew Harris	Free Trade
1895	(Sir) Matthew Harris	Free Trade
1898	(Sir) Matthew Harris	Free Trade
1901	Andrew Kelly	Labour

== Election results ==
=== Elections in the 1900s ===
==== 1901 ====
1901 New South Wales state election: Sydney-Denison
Party	Candidate	Votes	%	±%
Labour	Andrew Kelly	804	53.9	
Liberal Reform	George Harris	570	38.2	−22.2
Independent Liberal	William Watts	83	5.6	
Independent	James Hynes	35	2.4	
Total formal votes		1,492	98.7	−0.1
Informal votes		20	1.3	+0.1
Turnout		1,512	61.4	+8.8
Labour gain from Liberal Reform				

The sitting member Sir Matthew Harris (Liberal Reform) did not contest the election.

=== Elections in the 1890s ===
==== 1898 ====
1898 New South Wales colonial election: Sydney-Denison
Party	Candidate	Votes	%	±%
Free Trade	Matthew Harris	604	60.4	
National Federal	William Henson	376	37.6	
Independent	Alexander Hutchison	16	1.6	
Independent	Thomas O'Reilly	4	0.4	
Total formal votes		1,000	98.8	
Informal votes		12	1.2	
Turnout		1,012	52.6	
Free Trade hold				

==== 1895 ====
1895 New South Wales colonial election: Sydney-Denison
Party	Candidate	Votes	%	±%
Free Trade	Matthew Harris	674	61.6	
Protectionist	Henry Macnamara	421	38.5	
Total formal votes		1,095	99.2	
Informal votes		9	0.8	
Turnout		1,104	62.7	
Free Trade hold				

==== 1894 ====
1894 New South Wales colonial election: Sydney-Denison
Party	Candidate	Votes	%	±%
Free Trade	Matthew Harris	590	42.5	
Protectionist	Andrew Kelly	417	30.0	
Labour	Andrew Thompson	208	15.0	
Ind. Free Trade	Henry Willis	141	10.2	
Ind. Protectionist	Walter Dorman	33	2.4	
Total formal votes		1,389	98.5	
Informal votes		21	1.5	
Turnout		1,410	79.8	
Free Trade win		(new seat)		
