= 1896 Lachlan colonial by-election =

Election result for Lachlan, New South Wales, Australia

A by-election was held for the New South Wales Legislative Assembly electorate of The Lachlan on 2 April 1896 because of the bankruptcy of James Carroll (Protectionist).

== Dates ==
Date	Event
3 September 1896	James Carroll resigned from the Legislative Assembly.
4 September 1896	James Carroll made bankrupt.
4 September 1896	Writ of election issued by the Speaker of the Legislative Assembly.
11 September 1896	Nominations
18 September 1896	Polling day
2 October 1896	Return of writ

== Result ==
1896 Lachlan by-election Friday 11 September
Party	Candidate	Votes	%	±%
Protectionist	James Carroll	unopposed		
Protectionist hold				

== See also ==
- Electoral results for the district of Lachlan
- List of New South Wales state by-elections
