= 1879 Lachlan colonial by-election =

By-election in New South Wales, Australia

A by-election was held for the New South Wales Legislative Assembly electorate of The Lachlan on 10 January 1879 because James Watson was appointed Colonial Treasurer in the third Parkes ministry. Such ministerial by-elections were usually uncontested however on this occasion a poll was required in Canterbury (Sir Henry Parkes) and The Lachlan. Both were comfortably re-elected. The other 5 ministers were re-elected unopposed.

== Dates ==
Date	Event
21 December 1878	Third Parkes ministry appointed.
21 December 1878	Writ of election issued by the Speaker of the Legislative Assembly.
4 January 1879	Nominations
10 January 1879	Polling day
20 January 1879	Return of writ

== Result ==
1879 The Lachlan by-election Friday 10 January
Candidate	Votes	%
James Watson (re-elected)	1,055	54.7
George McLean	873	45.3
Total formal votes	1,928	100.0
Informal votes	0	0.0
Turnout	1,928	37.0

== See also ==
- Electoral results for the district of Lachlan
- List of New South Wales state by-elections
