= 1943 Lachlan state by-election =

Election result for Lachlan, New South Wales, Australia

A by-election was held for the New South Wales Legislative Assembly seat of Lachlan on 6 June 1943. It was triggered by the death of Griffith Evans (Country).

== Dates ==
Date	Event
16 August 1943	Griffith Evans died.
1 September 1943	Writ of election issued by the Speaker of the Legislative Assembly.
8 September 1943	Day of nomination
25 September 1943	Polling day
11 October 1943	Return of writ

== Result ==
1943 Lachlan by-election Saturday 25 September
Party	Candidate	Votes	%	±%
Labor	John Chanter	5,408	56.93	
Country	Lindsay McIvor	2,107	22.18	
Country	John Sommers	1,984	20.89	
Total formal votes		9,499	99.29	
Informal votes		68	0.71	
Turnout		9,567	74.86	
Labor gain from Country		Swing		

== See also ==
- Electoral results for the district of Lachlan
- List of New South Wales state by-elections
