= 1878 Canterbury colonial by-election =

By-election in New South Wales, Australia

A by-election was held for the New South Wales Legislative Assembly electorate of Canterbury on 10 January 1878 because Sir Henry Parkes was appointed Colonial Secretary forming the third Parkes ministry. Such ministerial by-elections were usually uncontested however on this occasion a poll was required in Canterbury and The Lachlan (James Watson). Both were comfortably re-elected. The other 5 ministers were re-elected unopposed.

== Dates ==
Date	Event
21 December 1878	Third Parkes ministry appointed.
21 December 1878	Writ of election issued by the Speaker of the Legislative Assembly.
28 December 1878	Nominations
31 December 1878	Polling day
20 January 1879	Return of writ

== Result ==
1878 Canterbury by-election Tuesday 31 December
Candidate	Votes	%
Sir Henry Parkes (re-elected)	1,048	90.9
Aaron Wheeler	105	9.1
Total formal votes	1,153	100.0
Informal votes	0	0.0
Turnout	1,153	15.7

== See also ==
- Electoral results for the district of Canterbury
- List of New South Wales state by-elections
