= Federated Clerks' Union of Australia =

Australia trade union

The Federated Clerks Union of Australia (FCU) was an Australian trade union representing clerical workers, in existence from 1911 to 1993, when it amalgamated with the Australian Services Union.

== History ==
Between 1900 and 1907, attempts were made to organise clerks in different parts of Australia. In Victoria the Union of Clerks was founded in 1901, and in South Australian an Associate of Clerks and in New South Wales a Clerks' Union were formed in 1905.

The FCU was formed in Melbourne in 1911, and was registered with the Commonwealth Arbitration Court the same year. It grew to include branches in all states by 1920, consolidating several pre-existing state unions, and held its first federal conference in 1916. It changed its name to the Australian Clerical Association in 1917, but reverted to its former name in 1924.

== Political position ==
The union drastically shifted ideological direction throughout its history. In the 1940s, it had a significant communist influence, with high-profile figures like Jack Hughes holding key union offices.

In the early 1950s, the union was successfully targeted and taken over by the conservative Industrial Groups, which subsequently played a role in the Australian Labor Party split of 1955, and the union was one of four unions disaffiliated from the Australian Labor Party. It was a key right-wing union for decades afterwards.

The union was taken over by moderate left-wing members in the 1980s in a push associated with Lindsay Tanner. The FCU was the first of four unions disaffiliated after the split of 1955 to attempt to return at the ALP Victorian State Conference in 1983. The Federated Clerks' case, 'after a bitter and at times acrimonious 3 and a 1/2 hour debate', which was 'centered on alleged links' with Santamaria, the National Civic Council, and the Industrial Action Fund, was defeated at the State Conference by 289 votes to 189. It was noted in a news report of the time that all four unions were likely to appeal to the federal ALP executive and that they had the support of then Prime Minister Bob Hawke. The ALP federal executive supported the re-affiliation before the 1985 Victorian State Conference while two of the unions, including the FCU, were refused re-affiliation in the Northern Territory later that year.

Ultimately, all four unions reaffiliated with ALP in some form, the FCU through amalgamation with the Australian Services Union in 1993.

== Amalgamation ==
In 1993, the FCU joined the Federated Municipal and Shire Council Employees Union (MEU) and the Australian Municipal, Transport, Energy, Water, Ports, Community & Information Services Union (which was also known as the Australian Services Union at the time) into a new union also called the Australian Services Union. The new union kept the affiliation with the ALP of its predecessor.
