= Matthew Harris (Australian politician) =

Australian politician (1841–1917)

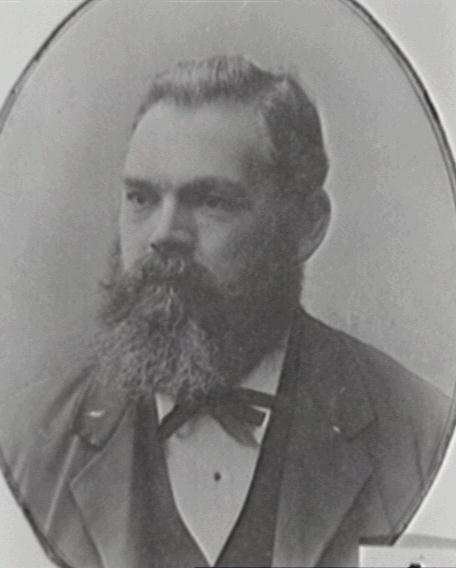
Sir Matthew Harris - City of Sydney Alderman 1883–1900 and Mayor 1898-1900

Sir Matthew Harris (18 September 1841 – 8 June 1917) was an Irish-born Australian politician.

== Life ==
He was born in Magherafelt in County Londonderry to John Harris and Nancy Ann McKee. The family migrated to Sydney in 1842 after his father had an inheritance from his great uncle John Harris. His brothers were William Henry and John and his niece was the racing driver Vida Jones.

Harris attended the University of Sydney, receiving a Bachelor of Arts in 1863; he inherited property from his father in 1862. On 4 August 1868 he married Frances Snowdon Lane, by whom he would have eleven children. From 1883 to 1900 he was a Sydney City alderman; he served as Mayor from 1898 to 1900. His term as mayor was marked by the sacking of the City Organist, Auguste Wiegand — an act, it was said, that was only regretted once.

In 1894 he was elected to the New South Wales Legislative Assembly as the Free Trade member for Sydney-Denison, serving until his retirement in 1901. He was knighted in 1899. Harris died at the Jenner Private Hospital in Potts Point in 1917.

New South Wales Legislative Assembly
New seat	Member for Sydney-Denison; 1894–1901	Succeeded by Andrew Kelly
Civic offices
Preceded by Isaac Ives	Mayor of Sydney; 1898–1900	Succeeded by James Graham
