= John Fisher (Australian journalist) =

Australian journalist

John Fisher (7 June 1910 – 25 August 1960) was an Australian journalist and son of Prime Minister Andrew Fisher.

Fisher was born in South Melbourne to serving prime minister Andrew Fisher and Margaret Jane, née Irvine. The Fishers moved to London in 1915 when Andrew became Australian High Commissioner to the United Kingdom. John was educated at Merchant Taylors' School and returned to Melbourne in 1930 as a cadet for Keith Murdoch's Herald. In 1934 Fisher was appointed publicity manager for the visit of Czechoslovak communist Egon Erwin Kisch, who was prohibited from entering Australia by the federal government (Kisch was to speak at a congress of the Movement Against War and Fascism). Fisher was involved in having the ban overturned and returned with Kisch to Europe in March 1935, helping to translate Kisch's Australian Landfall into English.

In 1935 Fisher settled in Moscow, where he worked on The Moscow News and wrote for International Literature. He travelled frequently to Brussels, London and Berlin and supported the Republicans in Spain, helping organise Australian support for the Spanish Republicans. He was assistant foreign editor for the Labor Daily and the communist Tribune until it was banned in May 1940. He unsuccessfully ran for Labor Party preselection for his father's old seat of Wide Bay, and at the 1940 federal election ran as a State Labor Party candidate for Hume, winning 4.9% of the vote. On 19 August 1941 he married Hansard stenographer Elizabeth Skelton in Sydney.

On 6 June 1942 Fisher left for Vladivostok to become the ABC's war correspondent in Moscow, broadcasting until 1943. After the war he moved to Prague, where he was a freelance journalist; he was expelled from Czechoslovakia in 1949 and moved to London. He and his wife separated and would divorce in 1959; Fisher returned to Sydney in 1954. He applied for a United Nations position in the Educational, Scientific and Cultural Organisation but was blocked by unfavourable government reports. He died of coronary vascular disease in 1960 at Plympton in Adelaide and was buried in the cemetery in Centennial Park.
