= Ian Armstrong (politician) =

Australian politician (1937–2020)

The Honourable Ian Armstrong AM, OBE

12th Deputy Premier of New South Wales
- In office 26 May 1993 – 4 April 1995
- Premier: John Fahey
- Preceded by: Wal Murray
- Succeeded by: Andrew Refshauge

Member of the New South Wales Parliament for Lachlan
- In office 19 September 1981 – 2 March 2007
- Preceded by: New District
- Succeeded by: District Abolished

Personal details
- Born: 17 July 1937
- Died: 16 December 2020 (aged 83)
- Party: National Party
- Education: Newington College

Ian Morton Armstrong, AM, OBE (17 July 1937 – 16 December 2020) was an Australian politician who served as Deputy Premier of New South Wales.

== Early life ==
Armstrong attended Newington College (1949–1953).

== Parliamentary career ==
Armstrong was a member of the New South Wales Legislative Assembly for Lachlan from 19 September 1981 to March 2007. He was Minister for Agriculture and Rural Affairs from 1988 to 1993. From 1993 until 1995, he was Deputy Premier of New South Wales as well as Minister for Ports and Minister for Public Works.

The Coalition government was defeated at the 1995 election and Armstrong stayed on as National Party leader when the Coalition then went into Opposition.

During this term in Opposition, a motion in the Legislative Assembly to gag Armstrong was passed thanks to the casting vote delivered by Labor Speaker John Murray against him and Murray attracted criticism for using his casting vote this way.

Although Armstrong was set to lead the Nationals at the March 1999 state election, he was unexpectedly ousted by his deputy George Souris just two months beforehand. This ousting came a month after Peter Collins was deposed as Liberal leader by Kerry Chikarovski.

Armstrong's seat of Lachlan was abolished shortly before the 2007 state election. This change prompted Armstrong's decision to leave the parliament; he had no particular interest in finding another constituency to represent, and he had already been in the legislature for more than a quarter of a century.

Nevertheless, Armstrong's public life did not end in 2007. Six years later he was appointed the inaugural Chair of Central Tablelands Local Land Services.

== Honours ==
In the 1979 New Year Honours, he was made an Officer of the Order of the British Empire (Civilian Division) in recognition of his service to primary industry and was awarded the Centenary Medal in 2001 for his service to the New South Wales Parliament and to international trade. In the Queen's Birthday Honours 2009 Armstrong was appointed a Member of the Order of Australia for service to the Parliament of New South Wales, to the agricultural and livestock sectors, and to the community.

The Ian Armstrong Building in Orange was named after Armstrong. It houses the headquarters of NSW Department of Primary Industries and offices of other state government departments. The building was officially opened and named in September 2020, a few months before Armstrong's death.

== Death ==
His death was announced on 16 December 2020.

New South Wales Legislative Assembly
New district	Member for Lachlan; 1981–2007	District abolished
Political offices
Preceded by Wal Murray	Deputy Premier of New South Wales; 1993–1995	Succeeded by Andrew Refshauge
Party political offices
Preceded by Wal Murray	Deputy Leader of the NSW National Party; 1984–1993	Succeeded by George Souris
Preceded by Wal Murray	Leader of the NSW National Party; 1993–1999	Succeeded by George Souris
