= John Nagel Ryan =

Irish-born Australian politician

John Nagel Ryan (1816 – 12 January 1887) was an Irish-born Australian politician.

He was born at Clonoulty in County Tipperary to pastoralist Edward Ryan and Ellen Nagel. He migrated to New South Wales around 1834, working for his father, who was now a squatter. In 1859 he was elected to the New South Wales Legislative Assembly for Lachlan, serving until his retirement in 1864. In 1871 he inherited his father's states, comprising 30,000 acres in the Boorowa-Binalong district. In 1883 he was appointed to the New South Wales Legislative Council, serving until his death at Galong, one of his stations, in 1887.

New South Wales Legislative Assembly
New seat	Member for Lachlan; 1859–1864	Succeeded by James Martin
