= Parkes ministry (1878–1883) =

Third Parkes ministry
- 19th Cabinet of the Colony of New South Wales

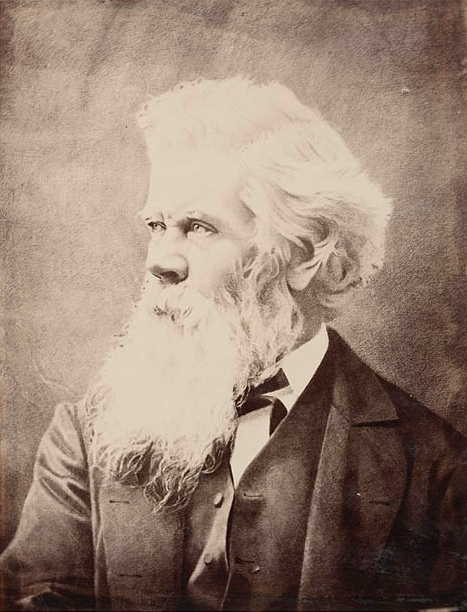
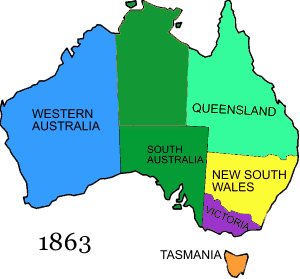
- Premier Henry Parkes and the Colony of New South Wales (1863–1900)
- Date formed: 21 December 1878
- Date dissolved: 4 January 1883

People and organisations
- Monarch: Queen Victoria
- Governor: Hercules Robinson / Lord Augustus Loftus
- Head of government: Henry Parkes
- No. of ministers: 10
- Member party: unaligned
- Status in legislature: Minority government
- Opposition party: unaligned
- Opposition leader: Alexander Stuart

History
- Predecessor: Farnell ministry
- Successor: Stuart ministry

The third Parkes ministry was the nineteenth ministry of the Colony of New South Wales, and was led by Sir Henry Parkes in a coalition with Sir John Robertson. It was the third of five occasions that Parkes was Leader of the Government.

Having served in the New South Wales Legislative Council between 1854 and 1856, Parkes was elected in the first free elections for the New South Wales Legislative Assembly held in 1856, however resigned from Parliament later that year. He served in the Assembly on several occasions, between 1858 and 1870, being forced to resign on at least one occasion due to his personal insolvency. He came to power as Premier on the first occasion in 1872, serving as Leader of the Government for a period of three years. However, Parkes lost the confidence of the Assembly following Governor Robinson's decision to release the bushranger Frank Gardiner, which led to the defeat of the ministry in 1875.

Robertson served as Leader of the Government between 1875 and 1877, before Robertson was defeated at the 1877 election. Parkes formed his second ministry in a challenging environment where both Parkes and Robertson shared equal representation in the Legislative Assembly and business was sometimes at a standstill. Parkes' second term as Colonial Premier lasted just 147 days, with the Farnell ministry giving both Parkes and Robertson reprieve for 12 months, prior to Parkes and Robertson forming an alliance government in this ministry.

The title of Premier was widely used to refer to the Leader of Government, but was not enshrined in formal use until 1920.

There was no party system in New South Wales politics until 1887. Under the constitution, ministers in the Legislative Assembly were required to resign to recontest their seats in a by-election when appointed. Such ministerial by-elections were usually uncontested and on this occasion a poll was required for Canterbury where Sir Henry Parkes was easily re-elected with more than 90% of the vote and The Lachlan where James Watson was re-elected. The 5 other ministers, James Hoskins (The Tumut), Francis Suttor (Bathurst), William Windeyer (University of Sydney), John Lackey (Central Cumberland) and Ezekiel Baker (Goldfields South), were re-elected unopposed. The 3 ministers subsequently appointed, Robert Wisdom (Morpeth), Arthur Renwick (East Sydney) and William Foster (Newtown), were also re-elected unopposed.

In 1880 the portfolio of Justice and Public Instruction was split into the portfolios of Justice and Public Instruction following the passage of the Public Instruction Act of 1880 which required a minister to assume the responsibilities of the former Council of Education.

The ministry was engulfed in a scandal in 1881. Ezekiel Baker resigned as Secretary for Mines in August 1881 following allegations concerning his conduct as a trustee of the Milburn Creek Copper Mining Co Ltd. Julian Salomons was appointed a royal commissioner to inquire into inquire into the expenditure and distribution of £17,100, paid by the Government, under the authority of a Parliamentary vote, to the company. Salomons reported that "there was an appropriation by the trustees to themselves ... but under circumstances of concealment and false statement" and that there was an inference that one of the trustees, George Waddell, had bribed a member of the Legislative Assembly, Thomas Garrett, to vote in favour of the payment. Following publication of the report, on 8 November Parkes moved that Baker was guilty "of conduct unworthy of a member of this House, and seriously reflecting upon the honour and dignity of Parliament", a motion that was carried by 71 votes to 2 and the assembly then voted to expel Baker. Two days later Parkes moved a similar motion in relation to Garrett, however the motion was defeated by 40 votes to 38. This was the end of the coalition between Parkes and Robertson, with Robertson resigning from the ministry because he could not consent to being one of the accusers of Mr Baker and Mr Garrett, and their cases should have been decided in a court of law.

This ministry covers the period from 21 December 1878 until 4 January 1883.

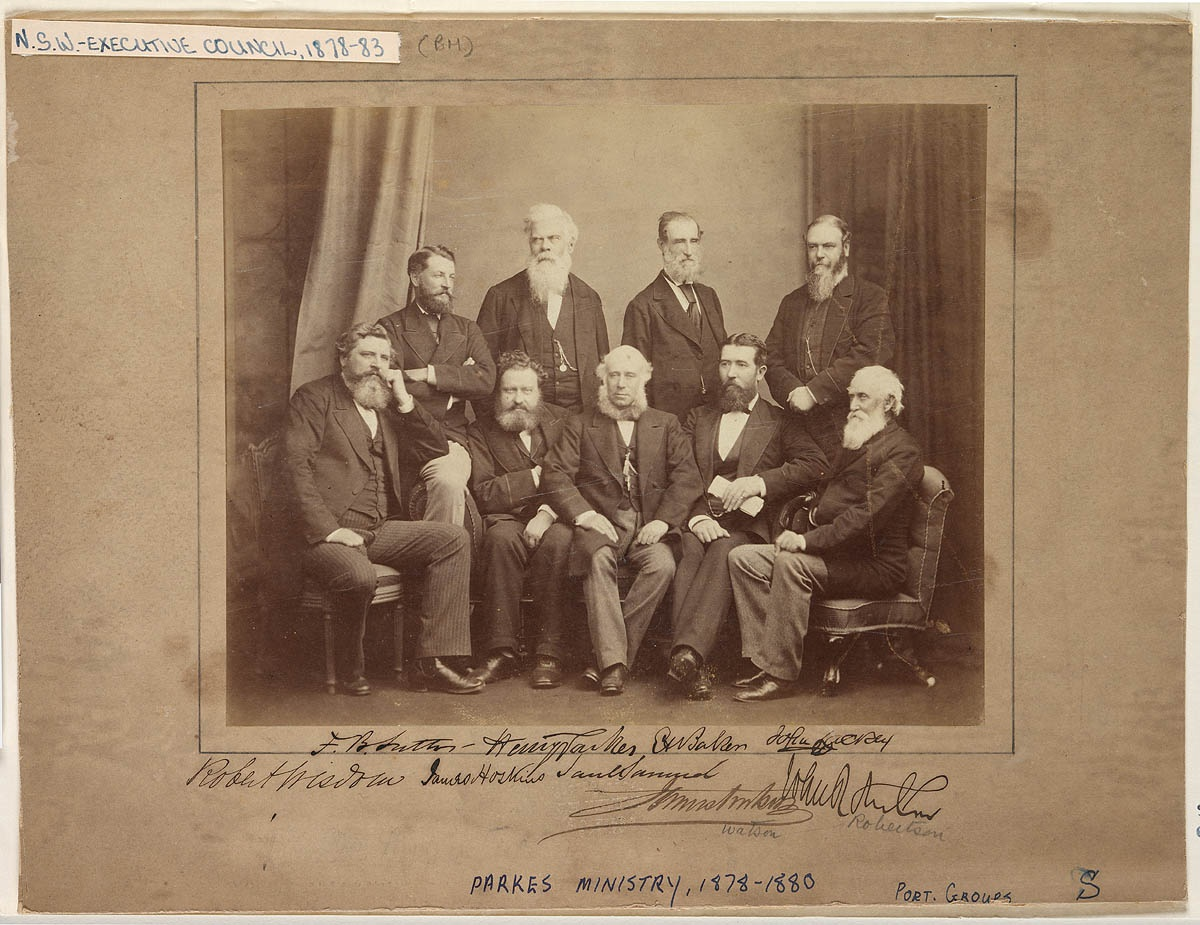

== Composition of ministry ==
Portfolio	Minister	Term start	Term end	Term length
Premier; Colonial Secretary	Sir Henry Parkes	21 December 1878	4 January 1883	4 years, 14 days
Secretary for Lands	James Hoskins	21 December 1878	28 December 1881	3 years, 7 days
Secretary for Lands	Sir John Robertson (Note: Sir John Robertson resigned from the Legislative Council on 31 December 1881 to return to the Legislative Assembly in the Mudgee by-election on 13 January 1882).	29 December 1881	4 January 1883	1 year, 6 days
Colonial Treasurer	James Watson	21 December 1878	4 January 1883	4 years, 14 days
Minister of Justice and Public Instruction	Francis Suttor	21 December 1878	30 April 1880	1 year, 131 days
Minister of Justice	Francis Suttor	1 May 1880	10 August 1880	101 days
Minister of Justice	Sir Joseph Innes MLC	11 August 1880	13 October 1881	63 days
Minister of Justice	William Foster	14 October 1881	4 January 1883	1 year, 82 days
Minister of Public Instruction	Sir John Robertson MLC	1 May 1880	10 November 1881	1 year, 193 days
Minister of Public Instruction	Francis Suttor	14 November 1881	4 January 1883	1 year, 51 days
Attorney General	William Windeyer	21 December 1878	10 August 1879	232 days
Attorney General	Robert Wisdom	13 August 1879	4 January 1883	3 years, 231 days
Secretary for Public Works	John Lackey	21 December 1878	4 January 1883	4 years, 14 days
Postmaster-General	Saul Samuel MLC	21 December 1878	10 August 1880	1 year, 233 days
Postmaster-General	Francis Suttor	11 August 1880	13 November 1881	94 days
Postmaster-General	Stephen Brown MLC	14 November 1881	22 August 1882	281 days
Postmaster-General	Alexander Campbell MLC	30 August 1882	4 January 1883	127 days
Secretary for Mines	Ezekiel Baker	21 December 1878	11 October 1881	2 years, 294 days
Secretary for Mines	Arthur Renwick	12 October 1881	4 January 1883	1 year, 84 days
Vice-President of the Executive Council; Representative of the Government in Legislative Council	Sir John Robertson MLC	21 December 1878	10 November 1881	2 years, 324 days
Vice-President of the Executive Council; Representative of the Government in Legislative Council	Frederick Darley MLC	14 November 1881	4 January 1883	1 year, 51 days

Ministers are members of the Legislative Assembly unless otherwise noted.

== See also ==
  - Members of Legislative Assembly
  - (1877–1880)
  - (1880–1882)
  - (1882–1885)
  - Members of Legislative Council
  - (1877–1880)
  - (1880–1882)
  - (1882–1885)
  - Parkes ministries
  - First (1872–1875)
  - Second (1877)
  - Fourth (1887–1889)
  - Fifth (1889–1891)

Preceded by Farnell ministry	Third Parkes ministry 1878–1883	Succeeded by Stuart ministry
