= Jack Hughes (trade unionist) =

Australian trade unionist

Morris John Rodwell Hughes (1910–1998) was an Australian trade unionist and communist.

Hughes was born in Sydney and joined the Australian Labor Party's Rockdale branch in 1927. He was elected to the State Conference in 1931 and the Central Socialisation Committee in 1932. In 1933 he became Assistant New South Wales Branch Secretary of the Federated Clerks' Union, becoming State Secretary and National Vice-president in 1942; he was President of the New South Wales Labor Council from 1937 to 1941. In 1940 he and other members of the Labor Party's left-wing formed the State Labor Party, also known as the Hughes-Evans Labor Party, in opposition to the right wing associated with Jack Lang. The State Labor Party merged with the Communist Party of Australia in 1944; Hughes remained active in the communist movement and spent some time as editor of the Communist Review. In 1959 as Chairman of the Communist Party's Central Disputes Committee he represented the Australian party at the 6th National Congress of the Partai Komunis Indonesia; he also travelled to China twice, in 1957 and 1984.
