= Sam Lewis (trade unionist) =

Samuel Phineas Lewis (15 June 1901 – 16 August 1976) was an Australian schoolteacher and trade unionist.

Lewis was born in Sydney to hairdresser Judah Henry Lewis and Rebecca Caroline, née Myers. After attending Cleveland Street Intermediate and Sydney Boys High schools on a bursary, he studied economics at the University of Sydney and then at Teachers' College, beginning his teaching career at Bondi Public School in 1921. He also joined the New South Wales Public School Teachers' Federation in 1921; posted to various state schools, he was sent to Narrabri in 1925 and campaigned for Jack Lang, attributing his subsequent posting at Atholwood near the border with Queensland as a reaction to his political activities.

Lewis returned to university part-time in 1929, teaching at Maroubra, and was a founding member and secretary of the Educational Workers' League, which advocated the abolition of public examinations, weekly tests, homework and corporal punishment. Sometime vice-president of the assistants' branch of the Teachers' Federation, he organised the Conference on Education for a Progressive Democratic Australia in 1938. A lapsed Jew, Lewis married fellow teacher Ethel Caroline Nelson Teerman on 20 December 1940 at Randwick. In the early 1930s, he had joined the Communist Party of Australia, becoming secretary of the Coogee branch, and, using the alias "Samuel Curtis", he was elected to the district committee in 1938. He contested the federal seat of Barton for the State Labor Party in 1940.

In 1943, Lewis was elected deputy president of the Teachers' Federation, rising to president in 1945. Lang, now a dissident member of the federal parliament, attacked Lewis as a well-known communist following his appointment as a delegate to the United Nations Educational, Scientific and Cultural Organisation meeting in Mexico City in 1947. He was defeated for the presidency in 1952, and he returned to teaching at Paddington and Newtown. In 1955, he received a reprimand after slapping a boy on the face, although fellow teachers rallied in support since Lewis had reportedly been provoked by a racist insult. In 1958, he was elected deputy president of the Teachers' Federation, and he reclaimed the presidency in 1964.

An activist president, Lewis strongly supported equal pay for women and the rights of teachers, achieving the right for complaints to be heard in the Industrial Commission of New South Wales rather than by the Public Service Board. A diabetic, he gave his last address as president in January 1968. In 1974, a stroke left him partially paralysed. Lewis died at Maroubra in 1976 and was cremated; he is remembered in the Sam Lewis peace awards, awarded by the Teachers' Federation since 1983. His daughter Jeannie Lewis is a well-known musician and stage performer.
