= Electoral district of Sydney-Denison =

Former state electoral district of New South Wales, Australia

Sydney-Denison was an electoral district of the Legislative Assembly in the Australian state of New South Wales, created in 1894 from part of the electoral district of West Sydney in the Ultimo area and named after Governor Denison.

== Members for Sydney-Denison ==
Member	Party	Term
(Sir) Matthew Harris	Free Trade	1894–1901
Andrew Kelly	Labour	1901–1904

== History ==
Multi-member constituencies were abolished in the 1893 redistribution, resulting in the creation of 76 new districts, including Sydney-Denison. Sydney-Denison consisted of a southern part of the four member district of West Sydney. It was to the south of Darling Harbour, bounded on the east by George Street, in the south by George St West, in the west by Bay Street and Wattle Street, Sydney and by Fig St across to Darling Harbour. In 1904 it was abolished and absorbed into the district of Pyrmont.

== Election results ==
1901 New South Wales state election: Sydney-Denison
Party	Candidate	Votes	%	±%
Labour	Andrew Kelly	804	53.9	
Liberal Reform	George Harris	570	38.2	−22.2
Independent Liberal	William Watts	83	5.6	
Independent	James Hynes	35	2.4	
Total formal votes		1,492	98.7	−0.1
Informal votes		20	1.3	+0.1
Turnout		1,512	61.4	+8.8
Labour gain from Liberal Reform				

The sitting member Sir Matthew Harris (Liberal Reform) did not contest the election.
