= Andrew Kelly (Australian politician) =

Australian politician (1854–1913)

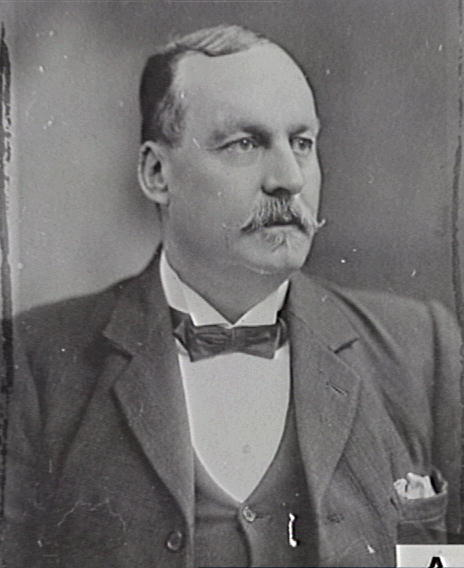

Member of the New South Wales Parliament for Electoral district of West Sydney
- In office 17 June 1891 – 25 June 1894 Serving with Thomas Davis (1891–1894); George Black (1891–1894); Jack FitzGerald (1891–1894)
- Preceded by: Daniel O'Connor
- Succeeded by: Seat Abolished

Member of the New South Wales Parliament for Electoral district of Sydney-Denison
- In office 3 July 1901 – 16 July 1904
- Preceded by: Sir Matthew Harris
- Succeeded by: Seat Abolished

Member of the New South Wales Parliament for Electoral district of Lachlan
- In office 6 August 1904 – 3 September 1913
- Preceded by: James Carroll
- Succeeded by: Thomas Brown

Personal details
- Born: 1854 Dublin, Ireland
- Died: 3 September 1913 (aged 59) Sydney
- Party: Labor Party
- Occupation: Dockworker, Drayman, Publican

Andrew Joseph Kelly (1854 – 3 September 1913) was an Irish-born union official and Labor Party politician who served as a member of the New South Wales Legislative Assembly in the periods 1891 to 1894 and 1901 to 1913. He was known familiarly as 'Andy' Kelly.

Kelly worked as a dock-worker and seaman before arriving in Australia in 1881. He became involved in union activities in Sydney and rose to prominent positions in several unions, including serving as president of the Sydney Trades and Labour Council.

In June 1891 Kelly was amongst the initial group of Labor Party members elected to the New South Wales parliament. He was one of four Labor members representing the electorate of West Sydney from 1891 to June 1894, although in November 1893 he was expelled from the party. In late 1894, after an unsuccessful bid for re-election as a Protectionist Party candidate, Kelly moved to West Wyalong where he became a hotelkeeper. He returned to Sydney in 1899. He leased a hotel and in 1900 was elected as an alderman of the Sydney City Council. In 1901 Kelly was accepted as the Labor candidate for the Sydney-Denison electorate, to which he was elected. The electorate was abolished after a re-distribution and reduction of constituencies. Kelly was then elected as the member for The Lachlan in 1904, a seat which he held until his death in 1913.

== Biography ==
=== Early years ===
Andrew Joseph Kelly was born in 1854 in Dublin, Ireland. He received his early education in the Irish national school system. As a young teenager Kelly "took to the sea... but after a year or so he abandoned the life of a sailor in favor of work on shore as a wharf-labourer". He began working as a stevedore's assistant for his uncle in Liverpool, England.

=== Dock worker and seaman ===
By about the early 1870s Kelly was working as a dock worker in Liverpool, during a period of economic prosperity, emerging unionisation and sporadic labour agitation. He was a participant in a dock workers' strike in Liverpool (possibly the series of industrial disputations for higher pay that occurred in 1872, culminating in a widespread but short-lived strike in October).

In about the mid-1870s Kelly sailed to America "where he followed various pursuits" and eventually joined the United States Navy at New Orleans, serving on several vessels including the battleship U.S.S. Colorado. After a naval service of three years he "spent a little time in sight-seeing" before he returned to Liverpool in 1878, working his passage aboard a vessel as a seaman.

By 1878 Kelly was employed as a seaman aboard the S.S. Idaho, a mail steamer travelling between Liverpool and New York with cargo and passengers. The vessel left New York on 21 May 1878. On 1 June, after having crossing the Atlantic, the vessel briefly docked at Queenstown on Ireland's south coast. After resuming the voyage, that evening in dense fog the S.S. Idaho struck Coningbeg Rock off the Saltee Islands, county Wexford in Ireland. The passengers and crew survived by escaping in lifeboats.

After being shipwrecked Kelly returned to Liverpool and laboured on the docks there for several years. He then went to London "to try his luck there [but] found that he could not better himself". He then resolved to immigrate to Australia.

=== Sydney ===
Kelly arrived in Sydney in 1881 where he worked as a waterside worker and joined the local union.^{[A]}

In November 1882 unionised dock workers on the Sydney waterside went on strike for higher pay. The strike committee formulated a set of rules that were registered as a new union body, the Sydney Wharf Labourers' Union, replacing the two "labouring men's" associations that had been formed a decade earlier. The standard rate of pay for wharf labourers at that time was a shilling per hour (for a ten hour day). The union applied for an additional threepence per hour due to the cost of living and the irregular nature of their employment. The strike lasted for four weeks, during which the employers refused to grant a pay increase despite the delays and inconvenience that ensued. Though the strike was described as "an utter failure", it resulted in a consolidation of the Wharf Labourers' Union as the dock workers' representative.

In 1884 Kelly entered into partnership with the journalist Edward W. O'Sullivan to publish the Democrat newspaper, "devoted to the interests of the working classes". However, the venture proved to be short-lived.

By January 1885 Kelly was serving as president of the Wharf Labourers' Union. In January 1886 he was recorded as vice-president of the union.

By 1888 Kelly was probably working as a carrier, driving a dray, when he was involved in the formation of a new draymen's union. Kelly became "a familiar figure in the streets of Sydney as a driver for a well-known city house". A meeting of the newly-formed Trolley and Draymen's Union was held in July 1888, at which office-bearers were elected and a code of rules drawn up for presentation at the next general meeting. Andrew Kelly was elected as the union president.^{[B]}

Kelly maintained his membership and involvement with the Wharf Labourers' Union.

Andrew J. Kelly was elected president of the Sydney Trades and Labour Council in early September 1889.

In late-March 1890 Kelly attended the Intercolonial Wharf Labourers' Union Conference in Sydney, during which he was elected president of the newly-formed Federated Wharf Laborers of Australasia. In October 1890, during the maritime strike, Kelly travelled to Orange and Forbes to organise mass public meetings on behalf of the Labor Defence Committee.

=== Political career ===
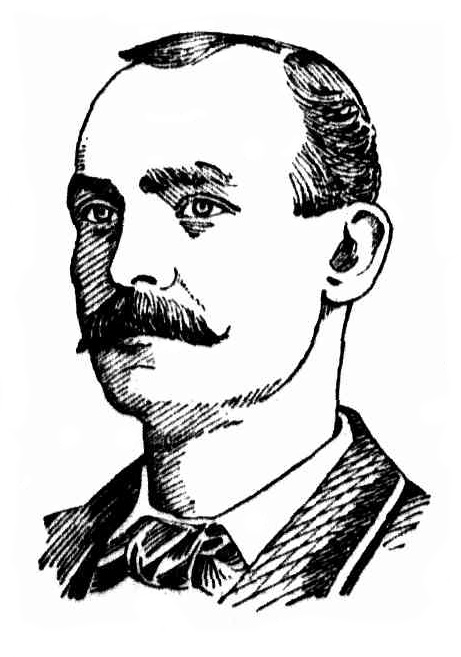
Illustration of Andrew J. Kelly, published in The Daily Telegraph, 5 July 1901.

==== Labor League successes ====
In April 1891 Kelly was a foundation member of the West Sydney Labor Electoral League. The 1891 general election in New South Wales, held in June and early July 1891, saw the first electoral successes of the Labor Party (then known as the Labor Electoral League of New South Wales). The local Labor Electoral League nominated four candidates for the four-member West Sydney electorate in the New South Wales Legislative Assembly. As well as Kelly, the nominees were John D. FitzGerald, George Black and Thomas M. Davis.

The four Labor League candidates contested the election for the West Sydney seats against four Free Trade Party candidates (three of whom had been sitting members) and one representing the Protectionist Party. The poll, held on 17 June 1891, resulted in the election of all four Labor Party candidates. FitzGerald, Black and Kelly each attracted about fifteen percent of the vote and Davis was elected in fourth place with about ten percent. In a speech to the electors of West Sydney thanking them for his election as one of their parliamentary representatives, Kelly proclaimed: "No one will ever see Andy Kelly in a top-hat". A newspaper report regarding the newly-elected labour members predicted that Kelly "will probably be the 'wild boy' of the party", describing how "he has already created a good deal of merriment by declaring with becoming solemnity from the hustings that, though he had been elected to Parliament, nothing would ever induce him to wear a top hat". As a result of his "top hat" quip, the parliamentarian became affectionately known as 'plug-hat' Kelly.

==== Caucus pledges ====
The nascent Labor party adopted a pledge in an attempt to enforce solidary amongst its parliamentary members. The initial Labor pledge, based on the trade union tradition of acceptance of decisions freely made at union meetings, called upon each selected Labor League candidate to agree to the party platform and subsequent decisions made at caucus meetings, as well as to sit on the cross benches if elected to parliament and resign if called upon by two-thirds of his electors. There was no unanimity of opinion amongst the Labor Party members on the fiscal issue of free trade versus protectionism (at that time the major parliamentary factions in the New South Wales parliament), and voting and debates on fiscal concerns often pitted the concept of party solidarity against members' personal beliefs and their constituents' interests.

Soon after parliamentary sittings commenced the unity of the Labor party members was tested by a censure motion against the government by George Dibbs, leader of the protectionist opposition. The Labor party decided to support the free trade government led by Henry Parkes, a party that had been weakened by the loss of seats at the election. Many of the city Labor Leagues had selected protectionist candidates, including Kelly, so the decision to support Parkes' government was not popular. Dibbs' censure motion was lost, though Kelly and four other Labor members voted for it, choosing their fiscal beliefs over party solidarity. Of the five dissenters, Kelly and James Morgan were singled out as "deserters from the Labour cause". An article in The Australian Workman claimed that as a consequence of their dissenting vote Kelly and Morgan "will not be allowed to attend any future caucus meetings of the party, or to in any way take part in the private deliberations of the party".^{[C]}

In September 1892, against the backdrop of a protracted miners' strike at Broken Hill, the leader of the opposition Free Trade Party, George Reid, made it known that he intended to introduce a motion of no-confidence in the Dibbs government. Discussions of parliamentary tactics between the executives of the Labour Electoral League and the Trades and Labour Council sought to link a condemnation of the government's oppressive response to the strike to the vote on Reid's censure motion. During the debate on the censure motion, Labor members made several attempts to introduce amendments condemning the government's actions at Broken Hill, but without success. In the end, however, the vote became a test of party solidarity for the Labor League members, placing their fiscal beliefs at the forefront in a vote of no-confidence by a free trade opposition against a protectionist government. When the vote was finally taken on 30 September 1892, Reid's motion was lost by 64 votes to 68. Twenty-three of the Labor members voted for the censure motion, a mix of free traders and protectionists. Kelly was one of the eleven Labor members who voted against the motion, all of them protectionists. Of the eleven only Kelly, John FitzGerald, James Johnston and William Sharp were by that stage seriously regarded as members of the party, each of them being prominent union leaders. On 6 October the Trades and Labour Council passed a resolution that "this Council views with contempt the inexecrable conduct of Messrs. Fitzgerald, Kelly, Sharp and Johnston... in the late political crisis".

Kelly responded to the denunciation of he and his colleagues by the Trades and Labour Council (TLC) in a strongly-worded letter published in The Australian Star. He pointed out that he and the three other Labor members denounced by the TLC had voted for John Cann's amendment condemning the government's heavy-handed action in arresting the Broken Hill strike leaders. Cann's proposed modification of the censure motion had failed to pass due to both the government and opposition voting against it, but Kelly noted that nine of the Labor League members had also voted against the amendment and accused the TLC of inconsistency by failing to denounce those members. For Kelly the final vote was a question of whether or not to support Reid's Free Trade party, of which he was "a declared opponent". He added that, as Reid had supported the government's actions in Broken Hill, he was "therefore no better friend to trades unionism" than the premier, George Dibbs, "whom [Reid] wished to displace". Kelly concluded his letter by pointing out that both leaders were "opposed to trade unionism", and asserted that he had "acted rightly by supporting the leader who was most in accord with my protectionist principles".

In September 1893 the Electoral Districts Commissioners presented their scheme of redistribution of seats under the new Electoral Act before the New South Wales Legislative Assembly. As part of the process, multi-member electorates were abolished and the electorates were realigned and in some cases renamed. The West Sydney electorate was split into the single-member electorates of Sydney-Gipps, Sydney-Lang, Sydney-Denison and Sydney-Pyrmont.

At the Labor conference in November 1893 a motion was submitted to the effect that the conference should recommend all Labor Leagues "to devise some means to heal the breach" between the party and Johnston, Sharp, Kelly and FitzGerald. The motion was "adversely debated" and an amendment was carried "declaring that they should be treated with undying hostility" and the four men were expelled from the party. The question of party solidarity and the signing of a pledge remained an issue for the Labor parliamentary members throughout the term of parliament from 1891 to 1894.

At the 1894 general election Kelly was nominated for the electorate of Sydney-Denison, representing the Protectionist Party. He was opposed by a Free Trade Party candidate, Matthew Harris, the Labor League candidate, Andrew Thompson, and two independent candidates. At the poll held on 17 July 1894 Kelly received 417 votes (30 percent), defeated by Harris of the Free Trade Party, who received 590 votes (42.5 percent).

==== West Wyalong ====
In December 1894 Kelly chaired a meeting at West Wyalong, in the northern Riverina region of New South Wales, in reference to a proposal to remove the Mining Registrar's Office from West Wyalong to the smaller nearby community of Wyalong. At the meeting Kelly agreed to take on the role of delegate to present a petition to the Minister for Mines in Sydney requesting that the transfer does not take place. By January 1895 Kelly was the publican of the Exchange Hotel at West Wyalong (known as Kelly's Exchange Hotel). In February 1895 it was reported that Kelly was part-proprietor of the Exchange Hotel (though the publican's license was held under Kelly's name).

In early December 1897 it was reported that Kelly had decided to contest the seat of Grenfell at the next general election in New South Wales. Although it was considered certain that the local Labor League would select William Holman as their candidate, Kelly planned to run as "an independent protectionist democrat" against the Labor candidate. A later report confirmed Holman as the selected Labor League candidate and described Kelly as "an independent labour candidate". By the time of the July 1898 general election Kelly's political affiliation was denoted as a federalist (supporting the concept of federation as advocated by Edmund Barton). At the poll held on 27 July 1898 Holman and Kelly were the only candidates for the electorate of Grenfell. George H. Greene, the sitting member, local pastoralist and free trader, did not contest the election. The result of the poll was that Holman won the seat with 55.6 percent of the vote.

==== Return to Sydney ====
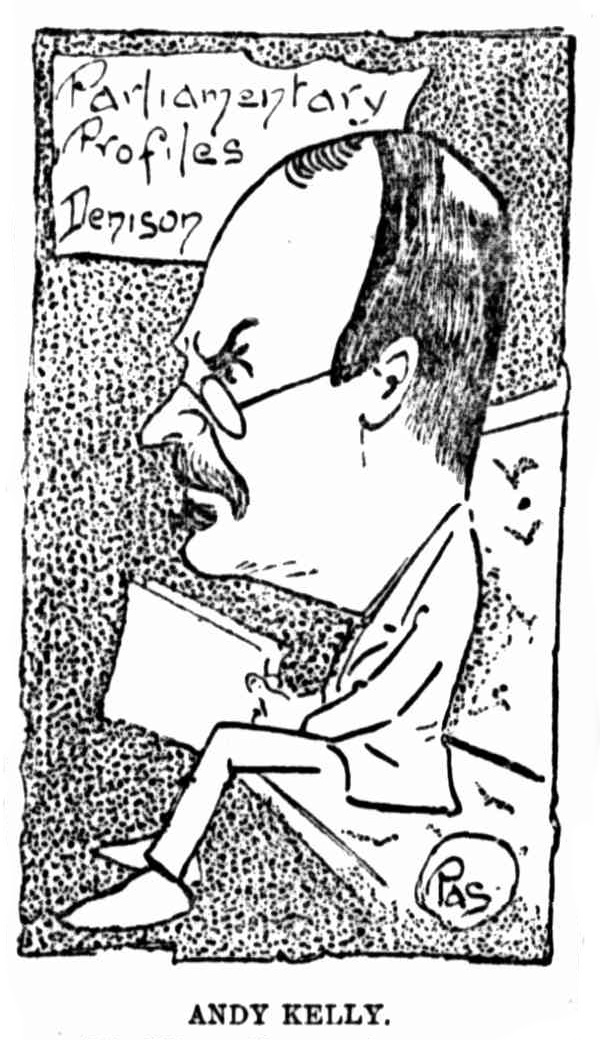
Caricature of 'Andy' Kelly, member for Sydney-Denison, published in Truth, 1 December 1901.

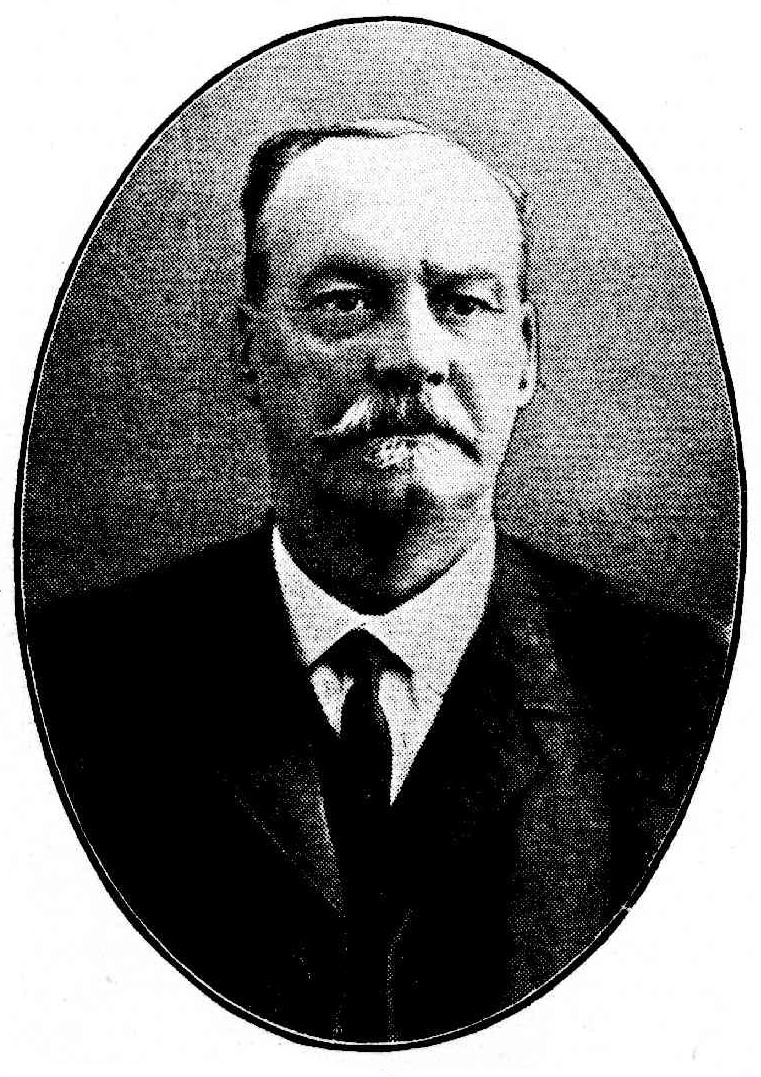
Andrew J. Kelly in later life, published in The Daily Telegraph, 4 September 1913.

By January 1899 Kelly had sold the Exchange Hotel at West Wyalong to George Lindsay, and returned to Sydney. From 1899 Kelly leased and held the publican's license of the Miners' Arms Hotel on the corner of Engine and George Streets in the Haymarket area of Sydney, after which he substantially renovated the building.

In November 1900 Kelly successfully stood for election as an alderman for Denison Ward of the Sydney City Council. He campaigned as a nominee of the Citizens' Vigilance Committee and Municipal Reform Association, a recently formed consolidation of three separate municipal reform groups claiming to represent "the commercal community, the working class, and the general body of taxpayers". Kelly served as an alderman until November 1906 during which time he was a member of various local government committees, including the Finance, Works and Health committees.

Andy Kelly was the Political Labor League nominee to contest the Sydney-Denison electorate at the 1901 New South Wales general election (even though some within the Labor party still considered him a 'traitor' and a 'blackleg'). The sitting member, Matthew Harris, did not contest the election. Kelly's candidature was opposed by two independent candidates as well as George Harris, the son of the retiring member and a barrister representing the Liberal Reform Party. Kelly was the successful candidate; he topped the poll, held on 3 July 1901, with 840 votes (53.9 percent).

The Sydney-Denison electorate was abolished following a federal referendum in December 1903 in which an overwhelming majority of New South Wales voters elected to reduce the number of members of the Legislative Assembly from 125 to 90. The re-distribution and reduction of electorates was completed in March 1904.

Kelly was nominated to contest The Lachlan electorate for the Labor Electoral League in the 1904 general election. His opponents were the sitting member James G. Carroll, an independent liberal candidate, and William J. Ferguson, representing the Liberal Reform Party (who had been the member for Sturt in the previous parliament). An article in Sydney's Daily Telegraph described the contest for The Lachlan electorate as a three-cornered fight, with the candidatures of Carroll and Ferguson threatening to split the vote of Liberal Reform Party supporters. Carroll had failed to get the party nomination, but had persisted in his candidature as an independent. In regard to Kelly, the Labor candidate, it was pointed out that he had a large following in Wyalong, but "at the other end of the electorate he is not much in favor". The poll held on 6 August 1904 resulted in a win for Kelly with 36.8 percent of the vote. The votes for Ferguson and Carroll were relatively evenly divided (as predicted by the Daily Telegraph article).

At the 1907 general election held on 10 September Kelly was opposed by the previous member, James Carroll, who on this occasion had gained the nomination of the Liberal Reform Party. Kelly was returned as the member for The Lachlan with 53.1 percent of the vote.

In December 1909 Kelly was elected as an alderman for Pyrmont Ward of the Sydney City Council. He served in that role until September 1913 during which time he was a member of various local government committees.

At the 1910 general election held on 14 October Kelly was opposed by one other candidate, William A. Ewers, representing the Liberal and Reform Association. Kelly was returned as member for The Lachlan with 52.9 percent of the vote. The general election resulted in the Labour Electoral League forming government for the first time, having won forty-six of the ninety seats in the Legislative Assembly.

=== Death ===
Towards the end of his life Kelly suffered from a "lingering illness". From about March 1913 "his health failed rapidly". Within three months he had retired from his parliamentary duties.

Andrew Joseph Kelly died of cancer on 3 September 1913 at his residence at the Royal Exhibition Hotel in Chalmers Street, Sydney. He was buried the following day in Waverley cemetery. On the day of his funeral, as marks of respect, the flag at the Sydney Town Hall was lowered to half-mast and the afternoon session of the Legislative Assembly was adjourned.

== Notes ==
A.Prior to November 1882 the Sydney waterside workers were represented by two bodies, the Labouring Men's Union of Circular Quay and the West Sydney Labouring Men's Association. These associations advocated for an eight-hour day and were eventually successful in obtaining a pay increase from nine shillings to ten shillings per day for dock workers. In general, however, shipowners were dismissive of these unions and strike actions were unsuccessful due to the ready availability of non-union labour. In July 1881 legislation was introduced into the New South Wales parliament to legalise trade unions, which became law in December 1881.

B.The process of forming a union of tipcarters and draymen had been commenced in April 1886, resulting in the formation of the Tipcarters' and Draymen's Union.

C.The other three Legislative Assembly members, whose dissenting votes were not considered as harshly as those of Kelly and Morgan, were James Mackinnon, John Gough and Robert Vaughn. Mackinnon, one of two members for Young, had not actually signed the Labor pledge. Gough (the other member for Young) and Vaughn, the member for Grenfell, had advised the party prior to the censure vote that "they had been elected more as Oppositionists than as Labour members".

New South Wales Legislative Assembly
Preceded by Daniel O'Connor	Member for West Sydney; 1891–1894; Served alongside: Jack FitzGerald; George Black; Thomas Davis	Succeeded by Seat Abolished
Preceded by Sir Matthew Harris	Member for Sydney-Denison; 1901–1904	Succeeded by Seat Abolished
Preceded by James Carroll	Member for The Lachlan; 1904–1913	Succeeded by Thomas Brown
