= John Courtenay Chanter =

Australian politician (1881–1962)

Major John Chanter

Member of the New South Wales Parliament for Lachlan
- In office 25 September 1943 – 29 March 1947

Personal details
- Born: John Courtenay Chanter; 17 February 1881 Near Rochester, Victoria
- Died: 23 February 1962 (aged 81) Lake Cargelligo, New South Wales
- Resting place: Lake Cargelligo Cemetery
- Party: Labor Party
- Spouse: Eileen Francis Daicy
- Children: 2
- Occupation: Sawmiller, Farmer
- Awards: Distinguished Service Order (1919)

Military service
- Allegiance: Commonwealth of Australia
- Branch/service: Australian Army
- Years of service: unknown, 1914–1918
- Rank: Major
- Unit: 'D' Squadron, NSW Citizen's Bushmen Regiment; Australian Imperial Force, 9th and 4th Light Horse Regiment
- Battles/wars: South African War, World War I (Gallipoli and Damascus Campaigns)

John Courtenay Chanter (17 February 1881 – 23 February 1962) was an Australian politician and a member of the New South Wales Legislative Assembly between 1943 and 1947. He was a member of the Labor Party (ALP).

== Early life ==
Chanter was born in Panoomilloo near Rochester, Victoria and was the son of John Chanter and Mary Anne Clark. His father was a farmer and politician who represented the seats of Murray and Deniliquin in the Legislative Assembly between 1885 and 1901 as a Protectionist. He held ministerial office as the Secretary of Mines in the government of George Dibbs. John Chanter, sr. was also the member for Riverina in the Australian House of Representatives at various times between 1901 and 1922. He was a member of the Protectionist Party until 1909, the Australian Labor Party and, after the Labor Party split of 1916, the Nationalist Party. John Chanter Jr. was educated at the State Primary School Moama. He established a sawmilling business in Barham and a wheat farm in Tongala. In 1927 he moved permanently to New South Wales and became a prominent wheat farmer in Lake Cargelligo. Chanter was involved in local organizations in Tongala and Lake Cargellico including the show societies, Wheatgrowers Union and Freemasons. He was elected to the position of councillor for Deakin Shire in Victoria between 1919 and 1926 and was the shire president in 1925–26. He was also elected to Lachlan Shire Council in New South Wales between 1928 and 1945 and was the president in 1940–1.

== Military service ==
In 1901, Chanter served with the 'D' Squadron, NSW Citizen's Bushmen Regiment during the Second Boer War. He also served with the Light Horse Regiment of the First Australian Imperial Force during the Gallipoli and Damascus campaigns of the First World War. He attained the rank of Major and was awarded the DSO in 1919.

== State Parliament ==
Chanter was elected to parliament as the Labor member for Lachlan at the September 1943 by-election caused by the death of the incumbent Country Party member Griffith Evans. His victory represented a 10% swing to the governing Labor party in a traditionally conservative area. Chanter defended the seat at the 1944 state election, but he was defeated by the Country Party's Robert Medcalf in 1947. He then retired from public life and resumed farming. He did not hold party, parliamentary or ministerial offices.

New South Wales Legislative Assembly
Preceded by Griffith Evans	Member for Lachlan; 1943–1947	Succeeded by Robert Medcalf
