= James Carroll (Australian politician) =

Australian politician

James George Carroll (1855 – 13 July 1927) was an Australian politician.

Born in County Tipperary, Ireland, to James and Katherine Carroll, he arrived in Australia in 1867 having received a primary education. He worked as a saddler in Hillston from 1876 until 1883, when he became the licensee of Tattersall's Hotel. He married Lizzie Sweetman, with whom he had two children. In 1894, he was elected to the New South Wales Legislative Assembly as the member for Lachlan as an Independent Protectionist; he was later associated with the Protectionist and Progressive parties. He moved to Sydney to become a land agent but was bankrupted in 1896 and discharged in 1897. Carroll left the Assembly in 1904 and died in 1927 in North Sydney.

New South Wales Legislative Assembly
New seat	Member for Lachlan; 1894–1904	Succeeded by Andrew Kelly
