= 1941 New South Wales state election =

State election for New South Wales, Australia in May 1941

← 1938	10 May 1941	1944 →

All 90 seats in the New South Wales Legislative Assembly 46 Assembly seats were needed for a majority
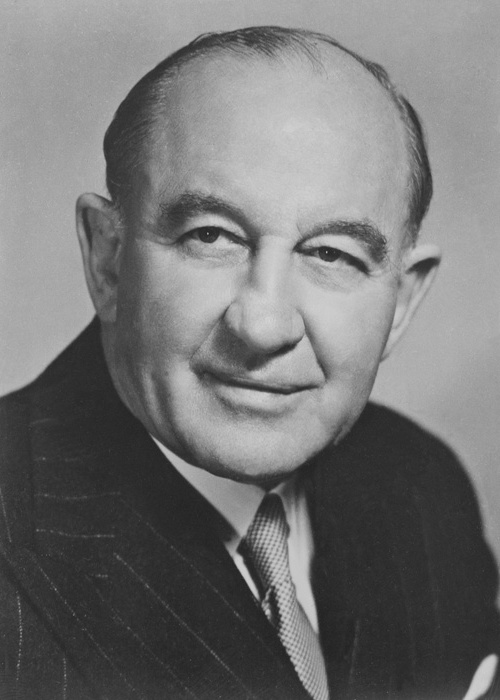

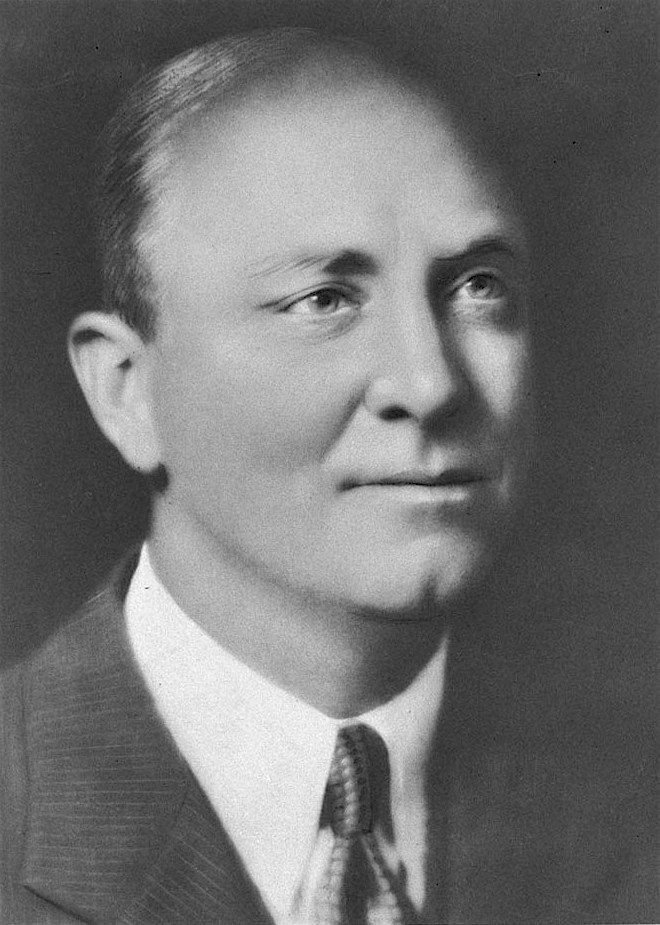
	First party	Second party
Leader	William McKell	Alexander Mair
Party	Labor	UAP/Country coalition
Leader since	23 September 1939	5 August 1939
Leader's seat	Redfern	Albury
Last election	30 seats	59 seats
Seats won	54	26
Seat change	▲24	▼33
Percentage	50.8%	31.3%
Swing	▲12.3 (Note: Labor swing includes Industrial Labor which was readmitted into Labor in August 1939.)	▼18.4
- Two-candidate-preferred margin by electorate
Premier before election
Alexander Mair
UAP/Country coalition
Elected Premier
William McKell
Labor

The 1941 New South Wales state election was held on 10 May 1941. This election was for all of the 90 seats in the 33rd New South Wales Legislative Assembly and was conducted in single-member constituencies with compulsory preferential voting.

== Background ==
The replacement of Jack Lang by William McKell as leader of the Labor Party in 1939 reunited and rejuvenated the party. A small number of Labor party members continued to support the far-left-wing State Labor Party (Hughes-Evans) but that had minimal impact on the election results. The Labor Party moved away from Lang's populist, inflationary policies, which were seen as extremist by many voters in the middle ground of the political spectrum. McKell also improved the party's standing in rural electorates by personally selecting well-known local candidates.

By contrast, the internal party divisions and lack of policy direction affecting the United Australia Party (UAP) had resulted in Alexander Mair replacing Bertram Stevens as leader of the UAP and Premier in August 1939. The problems continued in the period prior to the election and throughout the course of the new parliament. These divisions were reflected federally in the forced resignation of Robert Menzies as the Prime Minister in August 1941, and the UAP disintegrated at a state level in 1943. The remnants of the UAP combined with the newly formed Commonwealth Party to form the Democratic Party in that year. Mair remained Leader of the Opposition until 10 February 1944 when he was replaced by Reginald Weaver.

The result of the election was a landslide victory for the Labor Party:

- Australian Labor Party 54 seats
- Independent Labor 1 seat
- United Australia Party 14 seats
- Independent UAP 5 seats
- Country Party 12 seats
- Independent 4 seats.

The Labor Party government of McKell had a majority of 18 and McKell remained Premier throughout the term of the Parliament. The Labor Party won two further seats from the Country Party at by-elections during the parliament. Jack Lang was expelled from the Labor Party in 1943, having persistently attacked the governments of McKell and Australian Prime minister John Curtin. Lang remained in parliament as the sole representative of Lang Labor.

This would be the first of NSW Labor's eight consecutive election victories.

== Key dates ==
Date	Event
18 April 1941	The Legislative Assembly was dissolved, and writs were issued by the Governor to proceed with an election.
22 April 1941	Nominations for candidates for the election closed at noon.
10 May 1941	Polling day.
16 May 1941	First McKell Ministry sworn in.
17 June 1941	Last day for the writs to be returned and the results formally declared.
28 May 1941	Opening of 33rd Parliament.

== Results ==
New South Wales state election, 10 May 1941 Legislative Assembly << 1938–1944 >>
Enrolled voters	1,684,781 (Note: There were 1,540,974 enrolled voters in contested electorates and 143,807 were enrolled in 7 uncontested electorates (four UAP and three Labor).)				
Votes cast	1,389,896		Turnout	92.52	−3.27
Informal votes	35,858		Informal	2.52	−0.13
Summary of votes by party
Party	Primary votes	%	Swing	Seats	Change
Labor	706,014	50.80	+12.28	54	+ 24
United Australia	281,982	20.29	–15.57	14	–23
Country	153,639	11.05	–2.81	12	–10
State Labor	78,363	5.64	+5.64	0	±0
Ind. United Australia	45,195	3.25	+3.25	5	+5
Independent Labor	29,677	2.14	+2.14	1	+1
New Social Order	8,906	0.64	+0.64	0	±0
Independent Coalition	925	0.07	+0.07	0	±0
Independent	85,195	6.13	–4.75	4	+3
Total	1,389,896			90	

Popular vote
Labor	50.80%
United	20.29%
Country	11.05%
State Labor	5.64%
Independent UAP	3.25%
Independent Labor	2.14%
Independents	6.13%
Parliamentary seats
Labor	54
United	14
Country	12
State Labor	0
Independent UAPs	5
Independent Labor	1
Independents	4

== Retiring members ==
=== United Australia ===
- Bruce Walker (Hawkesbury)

=== Country ===
- Harry Carter (Liverpool Plains)
- Robert Hankinson (Murrumbidgee )
- Colin Sinclair (Namoi)

== Changing seats ==
Seats changing hands
Seat	1938		1941	
Seat	Party	Member	Member	Party
Arncliffe	Labor	Joseph Cahill	District abolished	
Ashburnham	Country	Hilton Elliott	Edgar Dring	Labor
Barwon (Note: Ben Wade (Country) resigned and the resulting by-election was won by Roy Heferen (Labor) who retained the seat at this election.)	Country		Roy Heferen	Labor
Blacktown	New district		Frank Hill	Labor
Bondi	United Australia	Norman Thomas	Abe Landa	Labor
Burwood	United Australia	Harrie Mitchell	Gordon Jackett	Ind. United Australia
Castlereagh	Country	Alfred Yeo	Jack Renshaw	Labor
Concord	United Australia	Stan Lloyd	Bill Carlton	Labor
Cook's River	New district		Joseph Cahill	Labor
Coogee	United Australia	Thomas Mutch	Lou Cunningham	Labor
Cootamundra	Country	Bill Ross	District abolished	
Dulwich Hill	United Australia	Guy Arkins	George Weir	Labor
Drummoyne	United Australia	John Lee	Robert Greig	Labor
Dulwich Hill	Labor	Guy Arkins	George Weir	Labor
Georges River	United Australia	Cecil Monro	Arthur Williams	Labor
Glebe	Labor	Bill Carlton	District abolished	
Gloucester	United Australia	Charles Bennett	Ray Fitzgerald	Independent
Hawkesbury	United Australia	Bruce Walker	Frank Finnan	Labor
Hornsby	United Australia	James Shand	Sydney Storey	Ind. United Australia
Hurstville (Note: James Webb (United Australia) died and Clive Evatt (Industrial Labor) won the resulting by-election, retaining the seat as a Labor candidate.)	United Australia		Clive Evatt	Labor
Kogarah	United Australia	James Ross	William Currey	Labor
Liverpool Plains	Country	Harry Carter	Roger Nott	Labor
Monaro	Country	William Hedges	John Seiffert	Labor
Mosman	United Australia	Herbert Lloyd	Donald Macdonald	Ind. United Australia
Murrumbidgee	Country	Robert Hankinson (Note: Retired.)	George Enticknap	Independent Labor
Namoi	Country	Colin Sinclair	Raymond Hamilton	Labor
North Sydney	United Australia	Hubert Primrose	James Geraghty	Labor
Orange	United Australia	Alwyn Tonking	Bob O'Halloran	Labor
Oxley	United Australia	Lewis Martin	George Mitchell	Independent
Petersham	United Australia	Eric Solomon	District abolished	
Randwick	United Australia	Arthur Moverly	William Gollan	Labor
Rockdale	New district		John McGrath	Labor
Ryde (Note: Eric Spooner (United Australia) resigned and Arthur Williams (Labor) won the resulting by-election, but after the re-distribution Labor did not field a candidate.)	United Australia		James Shand	Ind. United Australia
South Coast	United Australia	Henry Bate	Rupert Beale	Independent
Tamworth (Note: Frank Chaffey (United Australia) died. His son Bill Chaffey won the resulting by-election as a UAP candidate however declined UAP endorsement for the 1941 election on the basis his support came from the Country Party as well as the UAP.)	United Australia		Bill Chaffey	Ind. United Australia
Wagga Wagga	Country	Matthew Kilpatrick	Eddie Graham	Labor
Waverley (Note: John Waddell (United Australia) died and Clarrie Martin (Industrial Labor) won the resulting by-election, retaining the seat as a Labor candidate.)	United Australia		Clarrie Martin	Labor
Wollongong-Kembla	New district		Billy Davies	Labor
Yass	United Australia	George Ardill	Bill Sheahan	Labor
Young	Country	Albert Reid	Fred Cahill	Labor

== See also ==
- Members of the New South Wales Legislative Assembly, 1941–1944
- Candidates of the 1941 New South Wales state election
