= Griffith Evans (politician) =

Australian politician

Personal details
- Born: 22 March 1869 Wagga Wagga, New South Wales
- Died: 16 August 1943 (aged 74) West Wyalong, New South Wales
- Party: Country Party

Griffith Parry Evans (22 March 1869 – 16 August 1943) was an Australian politician and a member of the New South Wales Legislative Assembly from 1941 until his death. He was a member of the Country Party.

== Early life ==
Evans was born in Wagga Wagga, the son of William Evans, a builder and was educated at Sydney Boys High School, and the Law Faculty of the University of Sydney. In his youth, he was a noted amateur cyclist. He was an articled clerk in 1888 and was admitted as a solicitor in 1893. Evans established a practice in West Wyalong and became active in local community organizations including the Farmers and Settlers Association, the hospital board and the Progress Association, he became a Councillor of the Country Party in 1938–40. Evans also owned an extensive sheep station near West Wyalong after 1909.

== State Parliament ==
Evans entered parliament as the Country Party member for Lachlan after he won the seat at 1938 state election. The long-term incumbent Country Party member and former party leader Ernest Buttenshaw had retired and Evans successfully contested the election against two other endorsed Country party candidates. He was 69 years old at the time of his initial election. In parliament he opposed several moves to place age limits on public servant positions and was noted for occasionally voting against his party's position. Evans retained the seat at the 1941 state election, but died suddenly in office two years later. He did not hold party, parliamentary or ministerial office.

In 1949, the Northern Riverina Football League, best and fairest player was awarded the Griffith P. Evans Cup, named after local solicitor and a former NSW State Member for Lachlan, whose family donated the cup. The best and fairest player in the NRFL is now awarded the Evans Medal.

New South Wales Legislative Assembly
Preceded by Ernest Buttenshaw	Member for Lachlan; 1938-1943	Succeeded by John Chanter
