= State Labor Party =

Australian political party, 1940–1944

The State Labor Party, also known as State Labor Party (Hughes-Evans), was an Australian political party which operated exclusively in the state of New South Wales (NSW) in the early 1940s. The party was initially a far-left faction of the Australian Labor Party, strongly opposed to the right-wing faction of the party dominated by Jack Lang, the NSW Premier between 1925 and 1927, and again between 1930 and 1932.

Lang dominated the NSW Branch of the Labor Party, in the 1920s and for most of the 1930s, and his leadership had produced a great deal of instability in the NSW Labor Party, with Lang's dominant group seceding in 1931 and rejoining the (National) Labor Party in 1936. In 1940 Lang again seceded from Labor, along with several supporters, and formed a new party called the Australian Labor Party (Non-Communist), which operated in the Federal sphere from 1940 to 1941 but had only minority support in the Labor movement of NSW. Lang and his group were reconciled to Labor in late 1941. This reconciliation was to be short-lived and Lang again seceded in 1943.

This grouping, which was to become the State Labor Party (NSW), was led by Jack Hughes, President of the NSW Labor Council, and Walter Evans, General Secretary of the NSW Labor Party. Both of these men were undercover members of the Communist Party of Australia (CPA), and worked closely with the CPA executive leadership, which had adopted a policy of encouraging disaffected ALP members seeking membership of the CPA, to remain in the Labor Party as undercover operatives. With the outbreak of World War II, preceded by the Molotov–Ribbentrop Pact, the priority of the CPA was to work to ensure Australian neutrality towards the war in Europe. Hughes and Evans devoted their efforts towards this end, in their capacity as powerful executives within the ALP.

Ultimately, the position of the Hughes-Evans group came to be seen as untenable within the ALP, and their influence began to wane. In August 1940, the federal executive of the ALP moved to suspend the NSW executive, including Hughes and Evans. Several weeks later Hughes, Evans and their supporters formed a new party, the State Labor Party. This was only weeks away from the federal elections of September 1940. State Labor contested the poll for election to the House of Representatives in NSW, and achieved 6.6% of the vote in that state (2.6% nationally), but failed to see any of its candidates (including Greg McGirr) elected.

The party contested the NSW State elections of May 1941, and secured 5.6% of the primary vote, but again failed to secure any seats. The party's final attempt to gain parliamentary representation was at the federal election of August 1943, but it polled less than 1% nationally. Five months later (January 1944), the State Labor Party voted to end its own existence and amalgamated with the CPA.
