= Electoral district of Lachlan =

Former state electoral district of New South Wales, Australia

Lachlan was an electoral district of the Legislative Assembly in the Australian state of New South Wales. During the first two Parliaments (1856–1859), there was an electorate in the same area called Lachlan and Lower Darling, named after the Lachlan and Darling Rivers. Lachlan was created in 1859 and abolished in 1880, partly replaced by Forbes. In 1894 Forbes was abolished and Lachlan was recreated. In 1920 Lachlan and Ashburnham were absorbed into Murrumbidgee and elected three members under proportional representation. At the end of proportional representation in 1927, Lachlan was recreated. It was abolished in 1950, recreated in 1981 and abolished in 2007.

The abolition of Lachlan for the 2007 election prompted its member, former Deputy Premier Ian Armstrong to retire at that election rather than seek the option of remaining in Parliament by contesting another seat.

== Members for Lachlan ==
First incarnation (1859–1880)
Member	Party	Term
John Ryan	None	1859–1864
James Martin	None	1864–1869
James Watson	None	1869–1880
Second incarnation (1894–1920)
Member	Party	Term
James Carroll	Ind. Protectionist	1894–1895
James Carroll	Protectionist	1895–1901
James Carroll	Progressive	1901–1904
Andrew Kelly	Labor	1904–1913
Thomas Brown	Labor	1913–1917
Ernest Buttenshaw	Nationalist	1917–1920
Third incarnation (1927–1950)
Member	Party	Term
Ernest Buttenshaw	Country	1927–1938
Griffith Evans	Country	1938–1943
John Chanter	Labor	1943–1947
Robert Medcalf	Country	1947–1950
Fourth incarnation (1981–2007)
Member	Party	Term
Ian Armstrong	National	1981–2007

== Election results ==
2003 New South Wales state election: Lachlan
Party	Candidate	Votes	%	±%
National	Ian Armstrong	26,961	66.0	+10.9
Labor	Stephen Pollard	10,374	25.4	−2.1
One Nation	Russell Constable	1,791	4.4	−8.6
Greens	Jenny McKinnon	1,696	4.2	+2.5
Total formal votes		40,822	98.0	+0.1
Informal votes		814	2.0	−0.1
Turnout		41,636	93.8	
Two-party-preferred result
National	Ian Armstrong	27,830	71.2	+4.9
Labor	Stephen Pollard	11,253	28.8	−4.9
National hold		Swing	+4.9	
