= Renshaw ministry =

61st New South Wales government, led by Jack Renshaw

The Renshaw ministry was the 61st ministry of the government of New South Wales and was led by the 31st Premier, Jack Renshaw, of the Labor Party. The ministry was the only occasion when the government was led by Renshaw, as premier.

Renshaw was elected to the New South Wales Legislative Assembly in 1941 and served continuously until 1980, representing the seat of Castlereagh. Having served as the Secretary for Lands in the third McGirr ministry, Renshaw was promoted as the Secretary for Public Works and Minister for Local Government in the first and second Cahill ministries. He then served as the Minister for Local Government and the Minister for Highways in the third and fourth Cahill ministries. When Bob Heffron became Premier in 1959, Renshaw was elected as his Deputy, serving variously as the Treasurer, the Minister for Lands, the Minister for Agriculture, and the Minister for Industrial Development and Decentralisation in the first and second Heffron ministries. When Heffron resigned as Labor Leader in April 1964, Renshaw was elected to lead Labor and became Premier.

This ministry covers the period from 30 April 1964 until 13 May 1965, when the Renshaw-led Labor Government was defeated at the 1965 state election by the Liberal-Country coalition led by Robert Askin and Charles Cutler; ending twenty-four consecutive years of Labor government in New South Wales under William McKell, McGirr, Cahill, Heffron and Renshaw.

== Composition of ministry ==
The composition of the ministry was announced by Premier Renshaw following his appointment as Premier on 30 April 1964, and covers the period until 13 May 1965, when Renshaw's Labor-led government was defeated. Ministers are listed in order of seniority and in all cases, serve the full term of this ministry.

Portfolio	Minister	Party	Term commence	Term end	Term of office
Premier; Treasurer; Minister for Industrial Development and Decentralisation	Jack Renshaw (Note: Retained portfolios of Treasurer and Industrial Development and Decentralisation from second Heffron ministry.)	Labor	30 April 1964	13 May 1965	1 year, 13 days
Deputy Premier; Minister for Local Government; Minister for Highways	Pat Hills (Note: Retained portfolios of Local Government and Highways from second Heffron ministry.)	Labor	30 April 1964	13 May 1965	1 year, 13 days
Attorney–General; Vice-president of the Executive Council; Representative of the Government in Legislative Council	Reg Downing, MLC (Note: Retained portfolios from second Heffron ministry.)	Labor	30 April 1964	13 May 1965	1 year, 13 days
Chief Secretary; Minister for Tourism Activities	Gus Kelly	Labor	30 April 1964	13 May 1965	1 year, 13 days
Minister for Health	Bill Sheahan	Labor	30 April 1964	13 May 1965	1 year, 13 days
Minister for Child Welfare; Minister for Social Welfare	Frank Hawkins	Labor	30 April 1964	13 May 1965	1 year, 13 days
Minister for Agriculture; Minister for Conservation	George Enticknap	Labor	30 April 1964	13 May 1965	1 year, 13 days
Minister for Housing; Minister for Co-operative Societies	Abe Landa	Labor	30 April 1964	13 May 1965	1 year, 13 days
Minister for Education	Ernest Wetherell	Labor	30 April 1964	13 May 1965	1 year, 13 days
Minister for Labour and Industry	Jim Maloney, MLC	Labor	30 April 1964	13 May 1965	1 year, 13 days
Minister for Mines	Jim Simpson	Labor	30 April 1964	13 May 1965	1 year, 13 days
Minister for Transport	John McMahon	Labor	30 April 1964	13 May 1965	1 year, 13 days
Minister for Public Works	Norm Ryan	Labor	30 April 1964	13 May 1965	1 year, 13 days
Minister of Justice	Jack Mannix	Labor	30 April 1964	13 May 1965	1 year, 13 days
Minister for Lands	Keith Compton	Labor	30 April 1964	13 May 1965	1 year, 13 days
Assistant Minister	Thomas Murphy	Labor	30 April 1964	13 May 1965	1 year, 13 days

Ministers are members of the Legislative Assembly unless otherwise noted.

== See also ==
- Members of the New South Wales Legislative Assembly, 1962–1965
- Members of the New South Wales Legislative Council, 1961–1964
- Members of the New South Wales Legislative Council, 1964–1967

== Notes ==
Preceded by Heffron ministry (1962–1964)	Renshaw ministry 1964–1965	Succeeded by Askin–Cutler ministry (1965–1968)
