= Minister for Regional Transport =

Government minister in New South Wales, Australia

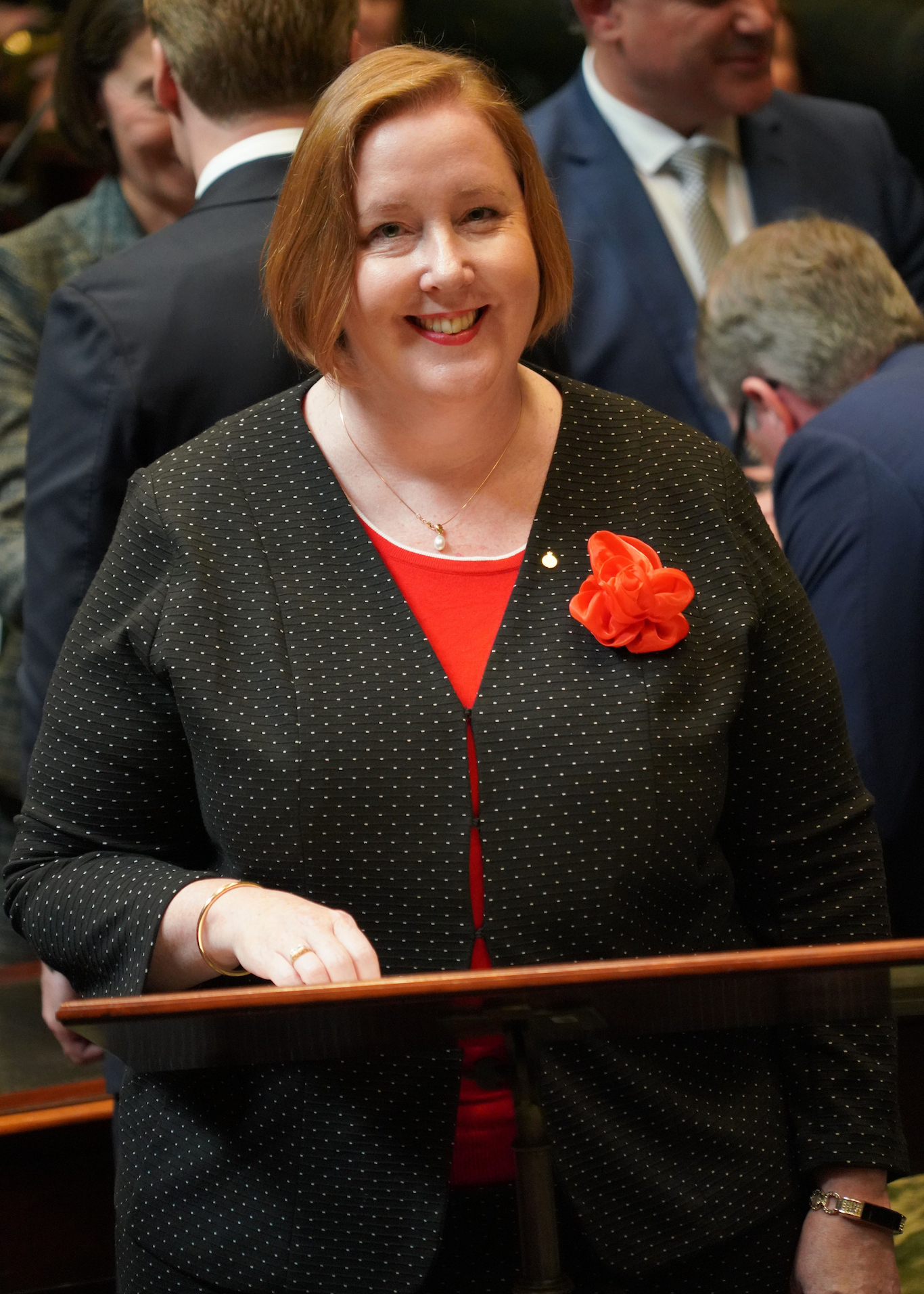
- Incumbent; Jenny Aitchison since 5 April 2023
- Department of Transport
- Style: The Honourable
- Nominator: Premier of New South Wales
- Appointer: Governor of New South Wales
- Inaugural holder: Paul Toole
- Formation: 2 April 2019

The Minister for Regional Transport is a minister in the Government of New South Wales who has responsibilities for the development of road infrastructure and road pricing, and taxi and hire car policy and regulation in the regional parts of the state.

In the Minns ministry since April 2023, it is one of three ministries in the transport sector and the Minister, presently Jenny Aitchison, works with the Minister for Transport and the Minister for Roads. Together they administer the portfolio through the Department of Transport (Transport for NSW) and a range of other government agencies that coordinate funding arrangements for transport operators, including hundreds of local and community transport operators.

In the Minns ministry there are two other ministers with specific regional responsibility:

- Minister for Regional New South Wales, Tara Moriarty
- Minister for Regional Health, Ryan Park.

== List of ministers ==
The following individuals have been appointed as Ministers for Regional Transport, or any precedent title.

Ministerial title	Minister	Party	Ministry	Term start	Term end	Time in office	Notes
Minister for Regional Transport and Roads	Paul Toole	National	Berejiklian (2); Perrottet (1)	2 April 2019	21 December 2021	2 years, 263 days	
Minister for Regional Transport and Roads	Sam Farraway	National	Perrottet (2)	21 December 2021	28 March 2023	1 year, 97 days	
Minister for Regional Transport and Roads	Jenny Aitchison	Labor	Minns	5 April 2023	17 March 2025	3 years, 155 days	
Minister for Regional Transport	Jenny Aitchison	Labor	Minns	17 March 2025	incumbent	3 years, 155 days	

== Related ministerial titles ==
=== Transport ===
The following individuals have been appointed as Ministers for Transport, or similar titles.

Ministerial title	Minister	Party	Ministry	Term start	Term end	Time in office	Notes
Minister for Railways	Richard Ball	Nationalist	Holman (2)	15 November 1919	12 April 1920	149 days	
Minister for Railways	John Estell	Labor	Storey; Dooley (1)	12 April 1920	20 December 1921	1 year, 252 days	
Minister for Railways	Sir Thomas Henley	Nationalist	Fuller (1)	20 December 1921 a.m.	20 December 1921 p.m.	7 hours	
Minister for Railways	John Estell	Labor	Dooley (2)	20 December 1921	13 April 1922	114 days	
Minister for Railways and State Industrial Enterprises	Sir Thomas Henley	Nationalist	Fuller (2)	13 April 1922	19 June 1922	67 days	
Minister for Railways and State Industrial Enterprises	Richard Ball	Nationalist	Fuller (2)	28 June 1922	17 June 1925	2 years, 354 days	
Minister for Railways	Martin Flannery	Labor	Lang (1)	17 June 1925	26 May 1927	1 year, 343 days	
Minister for Railways	Bill Ratcliffe	Labor	Lang (2)	27 May 1927	18 October 1927	144 days	
Minister for Railways	Ernest Buttenshaw	Country	Bavin	18 October 1927	16 April 1929	1 year, 180 days	
Minister for Transport	James McGirr	Lang Labor	Lang (3)	22 March 1932	13 May 1932	52 days	
Minister for Transport	Michael Bruxner	Country	Stevens (1) (2) (3); Mair	16 May 1932	16 May 1941	9 years, 3 days	
Minister for Transport	Maurice O'Sullivan	Labor	McKell (1) (2); McGirr (1) (2)	16 May 1941	30 June 1950	9 years, 45 days	
Minister for Transport	Bill Sheahan	Labor	McGirr (3); Cahill (1)	30 June 1950	23 February 1953	2 years, 238 days	
Minister for Transport	Clarrie Martin	Labor	Cahill (2)	23 February 1953	5 September 1953	194 days	
Minister for Transport	Joseph Cahill	Labor	Cahill (2)	7 September 1953	16 September 1953	9 days	
Minister for Transport	Ernest Wetherell	Labor	Cahill (2)	16 September 1953	15 March 1956	2 years, 181 days	
Minister for Transport	George Enticknap	Labor	Cahill (3) (4); Heffron (1)	15 March 1956	31 May 1960	4 years, 76 days	
Minister for Transport	John McMahon	Labor	Heffron (1) (2); Renshaw	31 May 1960	13 May 1965	4 years, 348 days	
Minister for Transport	Milton Morris	Liberal	Askin (1) (2) (3) (4) (5) (6)	13 May 1965	3 January 1975	9 years, 235 days	
Minister for Transport	Wal Fife (Note: Concurrently Minister for Highways)	Liberal	Lewis (1)	3 January 1975	10 October 1975	280 days	
Minister for Transport	Max Ruddock	Liberal	Lewis (1) (2)	10 October 1975	23 January 1976	105 days	
Minister for Transport	Tim Bruxner	Country	Willis	23 January 1976	14 May 1976	112 days	
Minister for Transport	Peter Cox (Note: Concurrently Minister for Highways until 19 October 1978.)	Labor	Wran (1) (2) (3) (4) (5) (6)	14 May 1976	5 April 1984	7 years, 327 days	
Minister for Transport	Barrie Unsworth	Labor	Wran (7) (8)	5 April 1984	6 February 1986	1 year, 307 days	
Minister for Transport	Ron Mulock	Labor	Unsworth	6 February 1986	26 November 1987	1 year, 293 days	
Minister for Transport	Terry Sheahan	Labor	Unsworth	26 November 1987	21 March 1988	116 days	
Minister for Transport	Bruce Baird (Note: Concurrently Minister for Roads from 26 May 1993.)	Liberal	Greiner (1) (2); Fahey (1) (2) (3)	25 March 1988	4 April 1995	7 years, 14 days	
Minister for Transport	Brian Langton	Labor	Carr (1)	4 April 1995	1 December 1997	2 years, 241 days	
Minister for Transport	Carl Scully	Labor	Carr (2) (3)	1 December 1997	2 April 2003	5 years, 122 days	
Minister for Transport Services	Michael Costa	Labor	Carr (4)	2 April 2003	21 January 2005	1 year, 294 days	
Minister for Transport	John Watkins	Labor	Iemma (1) (2)	21 January 2005	8 September 2008	3 years, 231 days	
Minister for Transport	David Campbell	Labor	Rees	8 September 2008	4 December 2009	1 year, 254 days	
Minister for Transport and Roads	David Campbell	Labor	Keneally	8 December 2009	20 May 2010	1 year, 254 days	
Minister for Transport	John Robertson	Labor	Keneally	21 May 2010	28 March 2011	311 days	
Minister for Transport	Gladys Berejiklian	Liberal	O'Farrell; Baird (1)	4 April 2011	1 April 2015	3 years, 362 days	
Minister for Transport and Infrastructure	Andrew Constance	Liberal	Baird (2); Berejiklian (1)	2 April 2015	2 April 2019	6 years, 186 days	
Minister for Transport and Roads	Andrew Constance	Liberal	Berejiklian (2)	2 April 2019	5 October 2021	6 years, 186 days	
Minister for Transport and Roads	Rob Stokes	Liberal	Perrottet (1)	6 October 2021	21 December 2021	76 days	
Minister for Transport	David Elliott	Liberal	Perrottet (2)	21 December 2021	28 March 2023	1 year, 97 days	
Minister for Transport	Jo Haylen	Labor	Minns	28 March 2023	6 February 2025	1 year, 315 days	
Minister for Transport	John Graham	Labor	Minns	6 February 2025	incumbent	1 year, 213 days	

=== Roads ===
The following individuals have been appointed as Ministers for highways or roads.

Ministerial title	Minister	Party	Ministry	Term start	Term end	Time in office	Notes
Minister for Highways	Jack Renshaw	Labor	Cahill (3) (4)	15 March 1956	28 October 1959	3 years, 227 days	
Minister for Highways	Pat Hills	Labor	Heffron (1) (2); Renshaw	28 October 1959	13 May 1965	5 years, 197 days	
Minister for Highways	Pat Morton	Liberal	Askin (1) (2) (3) (4)	13 May 1965	19 June 1972	7 years, 37 days	
Minister for Highways	Sir Charles Cutler	Country	Askin (4) (5) (6)	19 June 1972	3 January 1975	2 years, 198 days	
Minister for Highways	Wal Fife	Liberal	Lewis (1)	3 January 1975	10 October 1975	280 days	
Minister for Highways	Max Ruddock	Liberal	Lewis (1) (2)	10 October 1975	23 January 1976	105 days	
Minister for Highways	Tim Bruxner	Country	Willis	23 January 1976	14 May 1976	112 days	
Minister for Highways	Peter Cox	Labor	Wran (1)	14 May 1976	19 October 1978	2 years, 158 days	
Minister for Roads	Harry Jensen	Labor	Wran (2) (3)	19 October 1978	2 October 1981	2 years, 348 days	
Minister for Roads	Paul Whelan	Labor	Wran (4)	2 October 1981	1 February 1983	1 year, 122 days	
Minister for Roads	Rex Jackson	Labor	Wran (5)	1 February 1983	27 October 1983	268 days	
Minister for Roads	Laurie Brereton	Labor	Wran (5)	27 October 1983	10 November 1983	14 days	
Minister for Roads	George Paciullo	Labor	Wran (5)	10 November 1983	10 February 1984	92 days	
Minister for Roads	Pat Hills	Labor	Wran (6)	10 February 1984	5 April 1984	55 days	
Minister for Roads	Laurie Brereton	Labor	Wran (7) (8); Unsworth	5 April 1984	26 November 1987	3 years, 235 days	
Minister for Roads	Wal Murray	National	Greiner (1) (2); Fahey (1) (2)	24 July 1990	26 May 1993	2 years, 306 days	
Minister for Roads	Bruce Baird	Liberal	Fahey (3)	26 May 1993	4 April 1995	1 year, 313 days	
Minister for Roads	Michael Knight	Labor	Carr (1)	4 April 1995	28 November 1996	1 year, 238 days	
Minister for Roads	Carl Scully	Labor	Carr (1) (2) (3) (4)	28 November 1996	21 January 2005	8 years, 54 days	
Minister for Roads	Michael Costa	Labor	Iemma (1)	21 January 2005	3 August 2005	194 days	
Minister for Roads	Joe Tripodi	Labor	Iemma (1)	3 August 2005	17 February 2006	198 days	
Minister for Roads	Eric Roozendaal	Labor	Iemma (2)	17 February 2006	5 September 2008	2 years, 211 days	
Minister for Roads	Michael Daley	Labor	Rees	8 September 2008	14 September 2009	1 year, 6 days	
Minister for Transport and Roads	David Campbell	Labor	Keneally	8 December 2009	20 May 2010	163 days	
Minister for Roads	David Borger	Labor	Keneally	21 May 2010	28 March 2011	318 days	
Minister for Roads and Ports	Duncan Gay	National	O'Farrell	4 April 2011	23 April 2014	5 years, 301 days	
Minister for Roads and Freight	Duncan Gay	National	Baird (1)	23 April 2014	2 April 2015	5 years, 301 days	
Minister for Roads, Maritime and Freight	Duncan Gay	National	Baird (2)	2 April 2015	30 January 2017	5 years, 301 days	
Minister for Roads, Maritime and Freight	Melinda Pavey	National	Berejiklian (1)	30 January 2017	23 March 2019	2 years, 52 days	
Minister for Transport and Roads	Andrew Constance	Liberal	Berejiklian (2)	2 April 2019	5 October 2021	2 years, 186 days	
Minister for Transport and Roads	Rob Stokes	Liberal	Perrottet (1)	6 October 2021	21 December 2021	76 days	
Minister for Metropolitan Roads	Natalie Ward	Liberal	Perrottet (2)	21 December 2021	28 March 2023	1 year, 97 days	
Minister for Roads	John Graham	Labor	Minns	28 March 2023	17 March 2025	1 year, 354 days	
Minister for Roads	Jenny Aitchison	Labor	Minns	17 March 2025	incumbent	1 year, 174 days	

== See also ==
- List of New South Wales government agencies
