= Heffron ministry (1962–1964) =

60th New South Wales government, led by Bob Heffron

- 60th Cabinet of the State of New South Wales

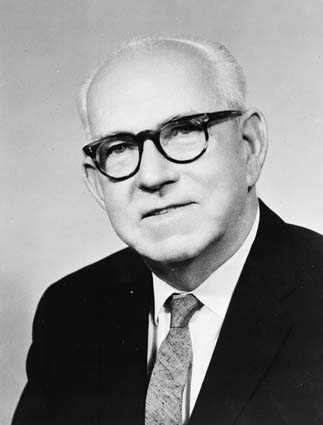
- Premier Bob Heffron
- Date formed: 14 March 1962
- Date dissolved: 30 April 1964

People and organisations
- Monarch: Elizabeth II
- Governor: Sir Eric Woodward
- Premier: Bob Heffron
- Deputy Premier: Jack Renshaw
- No. of ministers: 15
- Member party: Labor
- Status in legislature: Majority government
- Opposition party: Liberal–Country Coalition
- Opposition leader: Robert Askin

History
- Election: 1962 New South Wales election
- Predecessor: First Heffron ministry
- Successor: Renshaw ministry

The Heffron ministry (1962–1964) or Second Heffron ministry was the 60th ministry of the New South Wales Government, and was led by the 30th Premier, Bob Heffron, of the Labor Party. The ministry was the second of two consecutive occasions when the Government was led by Heffron, as Premier.

Heffron was first elected to the New South Wales Legislative Assembly in 1930 and served continuously until 1968, representing the seats of Botany and Maroubra. Having served continuously as Minister for Emergency Services in the first McKell ministry, and Minister for Education in the second McKell ministry, and in the first, second, and third ministries of Jim McGirr, and then the first, second, third and fourth ministries of Joseph Cahill. Heffron served as Deputy Premier to Cahill between 1953 and 1959 until Cahill died in office on 22 October 1959. The following day, Heffron was elected as Labor Leader and became Premier. Heffron led Labor to victory at the 1962 state election, where Labor's primary vote decreased by 0.55% however it picked up an additional 5 seats. Historian David Clune attributed Heffron's easy victory to a backlash against the economic policies of the Menzies federal government rather than a vote of confidence in Heffron's Labor.

This ministry covers the period from 14 March 1962 until 30 April 1964, when Heffron, aged 73, resigned as Premier and retired to the backbench, his successor as Premier being his deputy, Jack Renshaw.

== Composition of ministry ==
The composition of the ministry was announced by Premier Heffron following the 1962 state election on 14 March 1962, and covers the period until 30 April 1964, when Heffron resigned as Premier.

Portfolio	Minister	Party	Term commence	Term end	Term of office
Premier	Bob Heffron (Note: Retained portfolios from first Heffron ministry.)	Labor	14 March 1962	30 April 1964	2 years, 47 days
Deputy Premier; Treasurer; Minister for Industrial Development and Decentralisation	Jack Renshaw	Labor	14 March 1962	30 April 1964	2 years, 47 days
Attorney General; Vice-President of the Executive Council; Representative of the Government in Legislative Council	Reg Downing, MLC	Labor	14 March 1962	30 April 1964	2 years, 47 days
Chief Secretary; Minister for Tourist Activities	Gus Kelly	Labor	14 March 1962	30 April 1964	2 years, 47 days
Minister for Local Government; Minister for Highways	Pat Hills	Labor	14 March 1962	30 April 1964	2 years, 47 days
Minister for Health	Bill Sheahan	Labor	14 March 1962	30 April 1964	2 years, 47 days
Minister for Child Welfare; Minister for Social Welfare	Frank Hawkins	Labor	14 March 1962	30 April 1964	2 years, 47 days
Minister for Agriculture; Minister for Conservation	George Enticknap	Labor	14 March 1962	30 April 1964	2 years, 47 days
Minister for Housing; Minister for Co-operative Societies	Abe Landa	Labor	14 March 1962	30 April 1964	2 years, 47 days
Minister for Education	Ernest Wetherell	Labor	14 March 1962	30 April 1964	2 years, 47 days
Minister for Labour and Industry	Jim Maloney, MLC	Labor	14 March 1962	30 April 1964	2 years, 47 days
Minister for Mines	Jim Simpson	Labor	14 March 1962	30 April 1964	2 years, 47 days
Minister for Transport	John McMahon	Labor	14 March 1962	30 April 1964	2 years, 47 days
Minister for Public Works	Norm Ryan	Labor	14 March 1962	30 April 1964	2 years, 47 days
Minister of Justice	Jack Mannix	Labor	14 March 1962	30 April 1964	2 years, 47 days
Minister for Lands	Keith Compton	Labor	14 March 1962	30 April 1964	2 years, 47 days

Ministers are members of the Legislative Assembly unless otherwise noted.

== See also ==
  - Heffron ministries
  - First
  - Members of the New South Wales Legislative Assembly
  - 1962–1965
  - Members of the New South Wales Legislative Council
  - 1961–1964
  - 1964–1967

== Notes ==
New South Wales government ministries
Preceded by Heffron ministry (1959–1962)	Heffron ministry (1962–1964); 1962–1964	Succeeded by Renshaw ministry
