= Heffron ministry (1959–1962) =

59th New South Wales government, led by Bob Heffron

- 59th Cabinet of the State of New South Wales

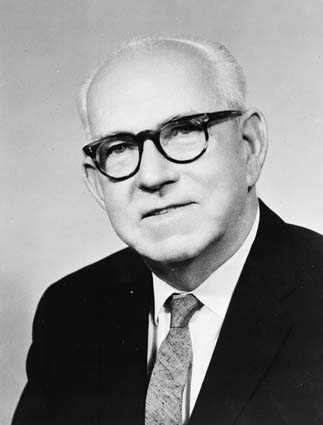
- Premier Bob Heffron
- Date formed: 28 October 1959
- Date dissolved: 14 March 1962

People and organisations
- Monarch: Elizabeth II
- Governor: Sir Eric Woodward
- Premier: Bob Heffron
- Deputy Premier: Jack Renshaw
- No. of ministers: 15
- Member party: Labor
- Status in legislature: Majority government
- Opposition party: Liberal–Country Coalition
- Opposition leader: Robert Askin

History
- Election: 1959 New South Wales election
- Predecessor: Fourth Cahill ministry
- Successor: Second Heffron ministry

The Heffron ministry (1959–1962) or First Heffron ministry was the 59th ministry of the New South Wales Government, and was led by the 30th Premier, Bob Heffron, of the Labor Party. The ministry was the first of two consecutive occasions when the Government was led by Heffron, as Premier.

Heffron was first elected to the New South Wales Legislative Assembly in 1930 and served continuously until 1968, representing the seats of Botany and Maroubra. Having served continuously as Minister for Emergency Services in the first McKell ministry, and Minister for Education in the second McKell ministry, and in the first, second, and third ministries of Jim McGirr, and then the first, second, third and fourth ministries of Joseph Cahill. Heffron served as Deputy Premier to Cahill between 1953 and 1959 until Cahill died in office on 22 October 1959. The following day, Heffron was elected as Labor Leader and became Premier, retaining Cahill's ministry intact. He had been narrowly been defeated in by McGirr in the leadership ballot in 1947. Issues during this ministry were the appointment of H. V. Evatt as Chief Justice of New South Wales, an appointment that was widely seen as a means of giving him a dignified exit from politics. Reg Downing, the Attorney General, refused to move the nomination in cabinet and the nomination was narrowly passed, 8 to 6. The ministry also proposed to abolish the Legislative Council of New South Wales, however the 1961 referendum was rejected, with only 42.4% support.

This ministry covers the period from 28 October 1959 until 14 March 1962, when Heffron led Labor to victory at the 1962 state election.

== Composition of ministry ==
The composition of the ministry was announced by Premier Heffron following his appointment as Premier on 23 October 1959, and covers the period until 14 March 1962, when the 1962 state election was held.

Portfolio	Minister	Party	Term commence	Term end	Term of office
Premier	Bob Heffron (Note: Retained portfolios from fourth Cahill ministry.)	Labor	28 October 1959	14 March 1962	2 years, 137 days
Minister of Education (Note: On 31 May 1960 Bob Heffron relinquished the portfolio of Education on 31 May 1960 triggering a series of portfolio changes. Ernest Wetherell replaced Heffron in Education, George Enticknap replaced Wetherell in Conservation, John McMahon replaced Enticknap in Transport and Jack Renshaw replaced McMahon, adding Lands to his portfolios.)	Bob Heffron	Labor	28 October 1959	31 May 1960	216 days
Minister of Education	Ernest Wetherell	Labor	31 May 1960	14 March 1962	1 year, 287 days
Deputy Premier; Treasurer	Jack Renshaw	Labor	28 October 1959	14 March 1962	2 years, 137 days
Attorney General; Vice-President of the Executive Council; Representative of the Government in Legislative Council	Reg Downing, MLC	Labor	28 October 1959	14 March 1962	2 years, 137 days
Minister of Justice (Note: On 31 May 1960 Reg Downing relinquished the portfolio of Justice, replaced by Jack Mannix)	Reg Downing, MLC	Labor	28 October 1959	31 May 1960	216 days
Minister of Justice	Jack Mannix ^{2}	Labor	31 May 1960	14 March 1962	1 year, 287 days
Chief Secretary; Minister for Tourist Activities	Gus Kelly	Labor	28 October 1959	14 March 1962	2 years, 137 days
Minister for Local Government; Minister for Highways	Pat Hills	Labor	28 October 1959	14 March 1962	2 years, 137 days
Minister for Health	Bill Sheahan	Labor	28 October 1959	14 March 1962	2 years, 137 days
Minister for Child Welfare; Minister for Social Welfare	Frank Hawkins	Labor	28 October 1959	14 March 1962	2 years, 137 days
Minister for Transport	George Enticknap	Labor	28 October 1959	31 May 1960	216 days
Minister for Transport	John McMahon	Labor	31 May 1960	14 March 1962	1 year, 287 days
Minister for Housing; Minister for Co-operative Societies	Abe Landa	Labor	28 October 1959	14 March 1962	2 years, 137 days
Minister for Conservation	Ernest Wetherell	Labor	28 October 1959	31 May 1960	216 days
Minister for Conservation	George Enticknap	Labor	31 May 1960	14 March 1962	1 year, 287 days
Minister for Agriculture	Roger Nott (Note: On 3 March 1961 Roger Nott resigned from the Legislative Assembly to accept an offer of appointment as Administrator of the Northern Territory by the Menzies coalition government. Jack Renshaw added Agriculture to his responsibilities and relinquished Lands, replaced by Keith Compton following a narrow victory in caucus.)	Labor	28 October 1959	3 March 1961	1 year, 126 days
Minister for Agriculture	Jack Renshaw	Labor	3 March 1961	14 March 1962	1 year, 11 days
Minister for Labour and Industry	Jim Maloney, MLC	Labor	28 October 1959	14 March 1962	2 years, 137 days
Minister for Mines	Jim Simpson	Labor	28 October 1959	14 March 1962	2 years, 137 days
Minister for Lands	John McMahon	Labor	28 October 1959	31 May 1960	216 days
Minister for Lands	Jack Renshaw	Labor	31 May 1960	3 March 1961	276 days
Minister for Lands	Keith Compton	Labor	3 March 1961	14 March 1962	1 year, 11 days
Minister for Public Works	Norm Ryan	Labor	28 October 1959	14 March 1962	2 years, 137 days
Assistant Minister	Jack Mannix	Labor	28 October 1959	14 March 1962	2 years, 137 days

Ministers are members of the Legislative Assembly unless otherwise noted.

== See also ==
- Heffron ministries
- Second
- Members of the New South Wales Legislative Assembly
- 1959–1962
- Members of the New South Wales Legislative Council
- 1958–1961
- 1961–1964

== Notes ==
New South Wales government ministries
Preceded by Cahill ministry (1959)	First Heffron ministry 1959–1962	Succeeded by Heffron ministry (1962–1964)
