= Cahill ministry (1953–1956) =

56th ministry of NSW, Australia

- 56th Cabinet of the State of New South Wales

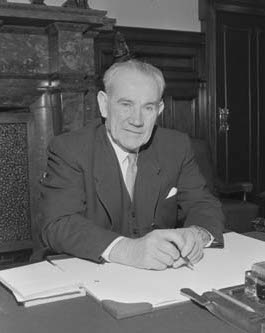
- Premier Joe Cahill
- Date formed: 23 February 1953
- Date dissolved: 15 March 1956

People and organisations
- Monarch: Elizabeth II
- Governor: Sir John Northcott
- Premier: Joe Cahill
- Deputy Premier: Bob Heffron
- No. of ministers: 15
- Member party: Labor
- Status in legislature: Majority government
- Opposition party: Liberal–Country Coalition
- Opposition leader: Vernon Treatt; Murray Robson; Pat Morton

History
- Election: 1953 New South Wales election
- Predecessor: First Cahill ministry
- Successor: Third Cahill ministry

The Cahill ministry (1953–1956) or Second Cahill ministry was the 56th ministry of the New South Wales Government, and was led by the 29th Premier, Joe Cahill, of the Labor Party. The ministry was the second of four consecutive occasions when the Government was led by Cahill as Premier.

Cahill was first elected to the New South Wales Legislative Assembly in 1925 and served until 1932, representing the seats of St George and Arncliffe before being defeated. He was re-elected in 1935, again representing Arncliffe, and then represented Cook's River between 1941 and 1959. Having served continuously as Secretary for Public Works in the first, second, and third ministries of Jim McGirr, when Deputy Premier Jack Baddeley resigned, Cahill was appointed as McGirr's deputy on 21 September 1949. Labor had lost its majority at the 1950 state election and McGirr resigned as Premier on 2 April 1952, with Cahill elected as Labor Leader and became Premier. Cahill led Labor to victory at the 1953 state election, gaining 11 seats and regaining its majority. The main changes from the first Cahill ministry were that Frank Finnan, the Minister for Labour, Industry and Social Welfare whose electorate of Darlinghurst was abolished, he lost a preselection contest for Concord, and failed to win Albury and Joshua Arthur voluntarily stood down as a minister pending a Royal Commission concerning his relationship with Reginald Doyle in the lead-up to the state election on 14 February 1953.

This ministry covers the period from 23 February 1953 until 15 March 1956, when Cahill led Labor to victory at the 1956 state election and the Third Cahill ministry was formed.

== Composition of ministry ==
The composition of the ministry was announced by Premier Cahill following the 1953 state election on 23 February 1953. There was a minor rearrangement of the ministry in September 1953, triggered by the death of the Minister for Transport, Clarrie Martin, on 5 September 1953. Cahill briefly held the Transport portfolio for nine days before he took the opportunity to make a minor rearrangement of the ministry. The second rearrangement of the ministry was triggered by Cahill forcing the resignation of the Minister for Housing and Minister for Co-operative Societies.Clive Evatt.

Portfolio	Minister	Party	Term commence	Term end	Term of office
Premier; Treasurer	Joe Cahill (Note: Retained portfolios from first Cahill ministry.)	Labor	23 February 1953	15 March 1956	3 years, 21 days
Deputy Premier; Minister for Education	Bob Heffron (Note: Retained portfolios of Deputy Premier and Education from first Cahill ministry.)	Labor	23 February 1953	15 March 1956	3 years, 21 days
Secretary for Mines	Bob Heffron	Labor	23 February 1953	16 September 1953	205 days
Secretary for Mines	Francis Buckley, MLC (Note: Clarrie Martin died while in office, serving as Minister for Transport. Joe Cahill served briefly as Minister for Transport in addition to other portfolios before rearranging the ministry, with Ernest Wetherell appointed Minister for Transport. Francis Buckley, who was without portfolio, was appointed as Secretary for Mines, replacing Deputy Premier, Bob Heffron. William Gollan replaced Buckley as minister without portfolio.) (Note: Francis Buckley's term in the Legislative Council expired on 30 June 1954. William Gollan was appointed as Secretary for Mines.)	Labor	16 September 1953	30 June 1954	287 days
Secretary for Mines	William Gollan	Labor	1 July 1954	15 March 1956	1 year, 258 days
Minister for Transport	Clarrie Martin	Labor	23 February 1953	5 September 1953	194 days
Minister for Transport	Joe Cahill	Labor	7 September 1953	16 September 1953	9 days
Minister for Transport	Ernest Wetherell	Labor	16 September 1953	15 March 1956	2 years, 181 days
Minister for Justice; Vice-president of the Executive Council; Representative of the Government in Legislative Council	Reg Downing, MLC	Labor	23 February 1953	15 March 1956	3 years, 21 days
Minister for Housing	Clive Evatt (Note: In 1954 Clive Evatt was forced to resign from the ministry. Evatt's portfolios of Housing and Co-operatives were both initially assumed by Gus Kelly, before John McGrath was appointed to Housing in September 1954.)	Labor	23 February 1953	1 April 1954	1 year, 37 days
Minister for Housing	Gus Kelly	Labor	1 April 1954	2 September 1954	154 days
Minister for Housing	John McGrath	Labor	2 September 1954	15 March 1956	1 year, 195 days
Minister for Co-operative Societies	Clive Evatt	Labor	23 February 1953	1 April 1954	1 year, 37 days
Minister for Co-operative Societies	Gus Kelly	Labor	1 April 1954	15 March 1956	1 year, 349 days
Chief Secretary; Minister for Immigration	Gus Kelly (Note: Retained portfolio of Chief Secretary from first Cahill ministry.)	Labor	23 February 1953	15 March 1956	3 years, 21 days
Minister for Health	Maurice O'Sullivan	Labor	23 February 1953	15 March 1956	3 years, 21 days
Minister for Agriculture; Minister for Food Production	Eddie Graham	Labor	23 February 1953	15 March 1956	3 years, 21 days
Attorney General	Bill Sheahan, QC	Labor	23 February 1953	15 March 1956	3 years, 21 days
Secretary for Lands	Frank Hawkins	Labor	23 February 1953	15 March 1956	3 years, 21 days
Secretary for Public Works; Minister for Local Government	Jack Renshaw	Labor	23 February 1953	15 March 1956	3 years, 21 days
Minister for Conservation	George Enticknap	Labor	23 February 1953	15 March 1956	3 years, 21 days
Minister for Labour and Industry; Minister for Social Welfare	Abe Landa	Labor	23 February 1953	15 March 1956	3 years, 21 days
Minister without portfolio	John McGrath	Labor	23 February 1953	2 September 1954	1 year, 191 days
Minister without portfolio	William Gollan	Labor	16 September 1953	1 July 1954	288 days
Minister without portfolio	Roger Nott	Labor	10 May 1954	15 March 1956	1 year, 310 days
Minister without portfolio	Jim Maloney, MLC	Labor	1 July 1954	15 March 1956	1 year, 258 days
Assistant Minister in the Legislative Council	Francis Buckley, MLC	Labor	23 February 1953	16 September 1953	205 days

Ministers are members of the Legislative Assembly unless otherwise noted.

== See also ==
- Cahill ministries
- First
- Third
- Fourth
- Members of the New South Wales Legislative Assembly
- 1953–1956
- Members of the New South Wales Legislative Council
- 1952–1955
- 1955–1958

== Notes ==
New South Wales government ministries
Preceded by Cahill ministry (1952–1953)	Cahill ministry (1953–1956); 1953–1956	Succeeded by Cahill ministry (1956–1959)
