= Cahill ministry (1959) =

- 58th Cabinet of the State of New South Wales

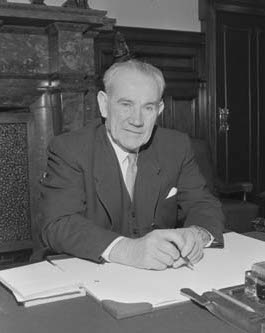
- Premier Joe Cahill
- Date formed: 1 April 1959
- Date dissolved: 22 October 1959

People and organisations
- Monarch: Elizabeth II
- Governor: Sir Eric Woodward
- Premier: Joe Cahill
- Deputy Premier: Bob Heffron
- No. of ministers: 15
- Member party: Labor
- Status in legislature: Majority government
- Opposition party: Liberal–Country Coalition
- Opposition leader: Pat Morton; Robert Askin

History
- Election: 1959 New South Wales election
- Predecessor: Third Cahill ministry
- Successor: First Heffron ministry

The Cahill ministry (1959) or Fourth Cahill ministry was the 58th ministry of the New South Wales Government, and was led by the 29th Premier, Joe Cahill, of the Labor Party. The ministry was the fourth and final of four consecutive occasions when the Government was led by Cahill, as Premier.

Cahill was first elected to the New South Wales Legislative Assembly in 1925 and served until 1932, representing the seats of St George and Arncliffe before being defeated. He was re-elected in 1935, again representing Arncliffe, and then represented Cook's River between 1941 and 1959. Having served continuously as Secretary for Public Works in the first, second, and third ministries of Jim McGirr, when Deputy Premier Jack Baddeley resigned, Cahill was appointed as McGirr's deputy on 21 September 1949. McGirr resigned as Premier several years later, on 2 April 1952, and Cahill was elected as Labor Leader and became Premier.

Cahill led Labor to victory at the 1953, 1956, and 1959 state elections. Ministers mostly retained their portfolios from the second Cahill ministry. The main changes were that John McGrath retired at the 1959 election, William Gollan was dropped from the ministry, while Pat Hills and Norm Ryan were promoted. Some ministerial titles were changed, dropping colonial and changing secretary to minister for lands, mines and public works.

This ministry covers the period from 1 April when Cahill won the 1959 state election, until 28 October 1959. On 22 October 1959 Cahill, a heavy smoker, died at Sydney Hospital of a myocardial infarction while still serving as Premier. Cahill's deputy, Bob Heffron succeeded Cahill as Premier.

== Composition of ministry ==
The composition of the ministry was announced by Premier Cahill following the 1959 state election on 1 April 1959, and covers the period until 28 October 1959, when the ministry was reconfigured as the First Heffron ministry.

Portfolio	Minister	Party	Term commence	Term end	Term of office
Premier; Treasurer	Joe Cahill (Note: Retained portfolios from third Cahill ministry.)	Labor	1 April 1959	22 October 1959	204 days
Premier; Treasurer	Bob Heffron	Labor	23 October 1959	28 October 1959	5 days
Deputy Premier	Bob Heffron	Labor	1 April 1959	23 October 1959	205 days
Minister for Education	Bob Heffron	Labor	1 April 1959	28 October 1959	210 days
Attorney–General; Minister for Justice; Vice-president of the Executive Council; Representative of the Government in Legislative Council	Reg Downing, MLC	Labor	1 April 1959	28 October 1959	210 days
Chief Secretary; Minister for Tourism Activities	Gus Kelly (Note: Retained portfolio of Chief Secretary from third Cahill ministry)	Labor	1 April 1959	28 October 1959	210 days
Minister Assisting the Premier and Treasurer	Pat Hills	Labor	1 April 1959	28 October 1959	210 days
Minister for Health	Bill Sheahan	Labor	1 April 1959	28 October 1959	210 days
Minister for Child Welfare; Minister for Social Welfare	Frank Hawkins	Labor	1 April 1959	28 October 1959	210 days
Minister for Local Government; Minister for Highways	Jack Renshaw	Labor	1 April 1959	28 October 1959	210 days
Minister for Transport	George Enticknap	Labor	1 April 1959	28 October 1959	210 days
Minister for Housing; Minister for Co-operative Societies	Abe Landa	Labor	1 April 1959	28 October 1959	210 days
Minister for Conservation	Ernest Wetherell	Labor	1 April 1959	28 October 1959	210 days
Minister for Agriculture	Roger Nott	Labor	1 April 1959	28 October 1959	210 days
Minister for Labour and Industry	Jim Maloney, MLC	Labor	1 April 1959	28 October 1959	210 days
Minister for Mines	Jim Simpson	Labor	1 April 1959	28 October 1959	210 days
Minister for Lands	John McMahon	Labor	1 April 1959	28 October 1959	210 days
Minister for Public Works	Norm Ryan	Labor	1 April 1959	28 October 1959	210 days

Ministers are members of the Legislative Assembly unless otherwise noted.

== See also ==
- Cahill ministries
- First
- Second
- Third
- Members of the New South Wales Legislative Assembly
- 1959–1962
- Members of the New South Wales Legislative Council
- 1958–1961

== Notes ==
New South Wales government ministries
Preceded by Cahill ministry (1956–1959)	Fourth Cahill ministry 1959	Succeeded by Heffron ministry (1959–1962)
