= Cahill ministry (1956–1959) =

- 57th Cabinet of the State of New South Wales

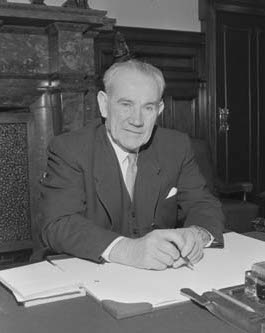
- Premier Joe Cahill
- Date formed: 15 March 1956
- Date dissolved: 1 April 1959

People and organisations
- Monarch: Elizabeth II
- Governor: Sir John Northcott; Sir Eric Woodward
- Premier: Joe Cahill
- Deputy Premier: Bob Heffron
- No. of ministers: 15
- Member party: Labor
- Status in legislature: Majority government
- Opposition party: Liberal–Country Coalition
- Opposition leader: Pat Morton

History
- Election: 1956 New South Wales election
- Predecessor: Second Cahill ministry
- Successor: Fourth Cahill ministry

The Cahill ministry (1956–1959) or Third Cahill ministry was the 57th ministry of the New South Wales Government, and was led by the 29th Premier, Joe Cahill, of the Labor Party. The ministry was the third of four consecutive occasions when the Government was led by Cahill, as Premier.

Cahill was first elected to the New South Wales Legislative Assembly in 1925 and served until 1932, representing the seats of St George and Arncliffe before being defeated. He was re-elected in 1935, again representing Arncliffe, and then represented Cook's River between 1941 and 1959. Having served continuously as Secretary for Public Works in the first, second, and third ministries of Jim McGirr, when Deputy Premier Jack Baddeley resigned, Cahill was appointed as McGirr's deputy on 21 September 1949. McGirr resigned as Premier several years later, on 2 April 1952, and Cahill was elected as Labor Leader and became Premier. Cahill led Labor to victory at the 1953 state election, gaining 11 seats and regaining its majority. The 1956 state election was a clear victory for Labor despite a net loss of 7 seats. The only minister from the second Cahill ministry not to be retained was Maurice O'Sullivan, while Jim Simpson was promoted to the ministry without a portfolio. There were significant changes to the distribution of portfolios, with only four ministers retaining their portfolios from the second Cahill ministry.

This ministry covers the period from 15 March 1956 when Cahill won the 1956 state election, until 1 April 1959, when Cahill led Labor to victory at the 1959 state election and the Fourth Cahill ministry was formed.

== Composition of ministry ==
The composition of this arrangement of the ministry was announced by Cahill on 15 March 1956 following the 1956 state election and covers the period until 1 April 1959, when the 1959 state election was held. There was a minor rearrangement of the ministry in November 1957, triggered by the death of Eddie Graham, the Minister for Agriculture and Minister for Food Production.

Portfolio	Minister	Party	Term commence	Term end	Term of office
Premier; Treasurer	Joe Cahill (Note: Retained portfolios from second Cahill ministry.)	Labor	15 March 1956	1 April 1959	3 years, 17 days
Deputy Premier; Minister of Education	Bob Heffron	Labor	15 March 1956	1 April 1959	3 years, 17 days
Attorney General; Minister for Justice; Vice-president of the Executive Council; Representative of the Government in Legislative Council	Reg Downing, MLC	Labor	15 March 1956	1 April 1959	3 years, 17 days
Chief Secretary; Minister for Immigration; Minister for Co-operative Societies	Gus Kelly	Labor	15 March 1956	1 April 1959	3 years, 17 days
Minister for Agriculture; Minister for Food Production	Eddie Graham (Note: Eddie Graham died on 13 November 1957. Roger Nott replaced Graham as Minister for Agriculture and Minister for Food Production, William Gollan replaced Nott as Secretary for Lands, Jim Simpson replaced Nott as Secretary for Mines and John McMahon replaced Simpson as minister without portfolio.)	Labor	15 March 1956	13 November 1957	1 year, 243 days
Minister for Agriculture; Minister for Food Production	Roger Nott	Labor	14 November 1957	1 April 1959	1 year, 138 days
Minister for Health	Bill Sheahan	Labor	15 March 1956	1 April 1959	3 years, 17 days
Minister for Child Welfare; Minister for Social Welfare	Frank Hawkins	Labor	15 March 1956	1 April 1959	3 years, 17 days
Minister for Local Government; Minister for Highways	Jack Renshaw	Labor	15 March 1956	1 April 1959	3 years, 17 days
Minister for Transport	George Enticknap	Labor	15 March 1956	1 April 1959	3 years, 17 days
Minister for Housing	Abe Landa	Labor	15 March 1956	1 April 1959	3 years, 17 days
Secretary for Public Works	John McGrath	Labor	15 March 1956	1 April 1959	3 years, 17 days
Minister for Conservation	Ernest Wetherell	Labor	15 March 1956	1 April 1959	3 years, 17 days
Secretary for Lands	Roger Nott	Labor	15 March 1956	22 November 1957	1 year, 252 days
Secretary for Lands	William Gollan	Labor	22 November 1957	1 April 1959	1 year, 130 days
Secretary for Mines	Roger Nott	Labor	15 March 1956	22 November 1957	1 year, 252 days
Secretary for Mines	Jim Simpson	Labor	22 November 1957	1 April 1959	1 year, 130 days
Minister for Labour and Industry	Jim Maloney, MLC	Labor	15 March 1956	1 April 1959	3 years, 17 days
Minister without portfolio	William Gollan	Labor	15 March 1956	22 November 1957	1 year, 252 days
Minister without portfolio	Jim Simpson	Labor	15 March 1956	22 November 1957	1 year, 252 days
Minister without portfolio	John McMahon	Labor	22 November 1957	1 April 1959	1 year, 130 days

Ministers are members of the Legislative Assembly unless otherwise noted.

== See also ==
- Cahill ministries
- First
- Second
- Fourth
- Members of the New South Wales Legislative Assembly
- 1956–1959
- Members of the New South Wales Legislative Council
- 1955–1958
- 1958–1961

== Notes ==
New South Wales government ministries
Preceded by Cahill ministry (1953–1956)	Third Cahill ministry 1956–1959	Succeeded by Cahill ministry (1959)
