= Cahill ministry (1952–53) =

55th New South Wales government, led by Joe Cahill

- 55th Cabinet of the State of New South Wales

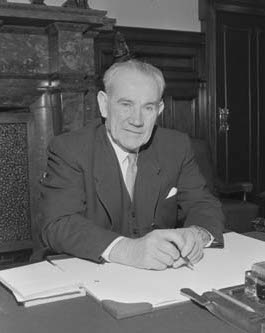
- Premier Joe Cahill
- Date formed: 3 April 1952
- Date dissolved: 23 February 1953

People and organisations
- Monarch: Elizabeth II
- Governor: Sir John Northcott
- Premier: Joe Cahill
- Deputy Premier: Bob Heffron
- No. of ministers: 15
- Member party: Labor
- Status in legislature: Minority government
- Opposition party: Liberal–Country Coalition
- Opposition leader: Vernon Treatt

History
- Election: 1950 New South Wales election
- Predecessor: Third McGirr ministry
- Successor: Second Cahill ministry

The Cahill ministry (1952–1953) or First Cahill ministry was the 55th ministry of the New South Wales Government, and was led by the 29th Premier, Joe Cahill, of the Labor Party. The ministry was the first of four consecutive occasions when the Government was led by Cahill, as Premier.

Cahill was first elected to the New South Wales Legislative Assembly in 1925 and served until 1932, representing the seats of St George and Arncliffe before being defeated. He was re-elected in 1935, again representing Arncliffe, and then represented Cook's River between 1941 and 1959. Having served continuously as Secretary for Public Works in the first, second, and third ministries of Jim McGirr, when Deputy Premier Jack Baddeley resigned, Cahill was appointed as McGirr's deputy on 21 September 1949. McGirr resigned as Premier several years later, on 2 April 1952, and Cahill was elected as Labor Leader and became Premier.

This ministry covers the period from 2 April 1952 until 23 February 1953 when Cahill led Labor to victory at the 1953 state election and the Second Cahill ministry was formed.

== Composition of ministry ==
The composition of the ministry was announced by Premier Cahill following his election as Labor Leader and his appointment as Premier on 2 April 1952, and covers the period until 23 February 1953. Ministers are listed in order of seniority and in most cases, serve the full term of this ministry.

Portfolio	Minister	Party	Term commence	Term end	Term of office
Premier	Joe Cahill	Labor	2 April 1952	23 February 1953	327 days
Treasurer; Minister for Local Government	Joe Cahill	Labor	3 April 1952	23 February 1953	326 days
Deputy Premier; Minister of Education	Bob Heffron (Note: Retained portfolio of Education from third McGirr ministry.)	Labor	3 April 1952	23 February 1953	326 days
Minister for Housing; Minister for Co-operative Societies; Assistant Treasurer	Clive Evatt (Note: Retained portfolios of Co-operative societies and Assistant Treasurer from third McGirr ministry.)	Labor	3 April 1952	23 February 1953	326 days
Attorney General	Clarrie Martin, KC (Note: Retained portfolios from third McGirr ministry.)	Labor	3 April 1952	23 February 1953	326 days
Minister for Justice; Vice-president of the Executive Council; Representative of the Government in Legislative Council	Reg Downing, MLC	Labor	3 April 1952	23 February 1953	326 days
Chief Secretary	Gus Kelly	Labor	3 April 1952	23 February 1953	326 days
Minister for Health	Maurice O'Sullivan	Labor	3 April 1952	23 February 1953	326 days
Minister for Secondary Industries and Minister for Building Materials	William Dickson, MLC (Note: Dickson resigned from the ministry in August 1952 and was appointed as President of the New South Wales Legislative Council. The portfolios of Secondary Industries and Building Materials were abolished.)	Labor	3 April 1952	15 August 1952	135 days
Minister for Agriculture	Eddie Graham	Labor	3 April 1952	23 February 1953	326 days
Minister for Conservation	George Weir (Note: George Weir, who was Minister for Conservation, was appointed as a Minister without Portfolio, acting briefly in the Transport portfolio, before his resignation from Parliament in 1953 and taking up an appointment as a Judge on the Industrial Relations Commission of New South Wales.)	Labor	3 April 1952	3 November 1952	214 days
Minister for Conservation	George Enticknap [Acting] (Note: George Enticknap, who was without portfolio, acted as Minister for Conservation before being appointed to the role in November 1952.)	Labor	28 August 1952	3 November 1952	179 days
Minister for Conservation	George Enticknap	Labor	3 November 1952	23 February 1953	179 days
Minister for Transport	Bill Sheahan	Labor	3 April 1952	23 February 1953	326 days
Minister for Transport	George Weir [Acting]	Labor	3 November 1952	29 December 1952	56 days
Minister for Labour and Industry; Minister for Social Welfare	Frank Finnan	Labor	3 April 1952	23 February 1953	326 days
Secretary for Mines; Minister for Immigration	Joshua Arthur (Note: On 12 February 1953 Joshua Arthur voluntarily stood down as a minister pending a Royal Commission concerning his relationship with Reginald Doyle in the lead-up to the state election on 14 February 1953.)	Labor	3 April 1952	12 February 1953	|315 days
Secretary for Lands	Frank Hawkins	Labor	3 April 1952	23 February 1953	326 days
Secretary for Public Works; Assistant Minister for Local Government	Jack Renshaw	Labor	3 April 1952	23 February 1953	326 days
Minister without portfolio	George Enticknap	Labor	3 April 1952	3 November 1952	214 days
Minister without portfolio	George Weir	Labor	3 November 1952	23 February 1953	112 days
Assistant Minister in the Legislative Council	Francis Buckley, MLC	Labor	19 November 1952	23 February 1953	96 days

== See also ==
- Cahill ministries
- Second
- Third
- Fourth
- Members of the New South Wales Legislative Assembly
- 1950–1953
- Members of the New South Wales Legislative Council
- 1949–1952
- 1952–1955

New South Wales government ministries
Preceded by McGirr ministry (1950–1952)	Cahill ministry (1952–1953); 1952–1953	Succeeded by Cahill ministry (1953–1956)
