= Secretary for Public Works (New South Wales) =

Government minister in New South Wales, Australia

Secretary for Public Works of New South Wales

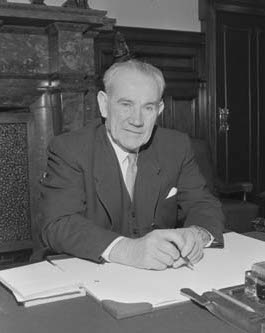
- Long serving minister Joseph Cahill
- Appointer: Governor of New South Wales
- Precursor: Secretary for Lands and Works
- Formation: 1 October 1859
- First holder: Edward Flood
- Final holder: Morris Iemma
- Abolished: 2 April 2003

The Secretary for Public Works, later the Minister for Public Works was a long standing ministry in the administration of New South Wales created in 1859 and abolished in 2003.

== Role and responsibilities ==
The Secretary for Lands and Works was one of the first ministries in the colonial administration of New South Wales and the land issue dominated the politics of the late 1850s. In October 1859, towards the end of the second Cowper ministry, the ministry was split into two ministries, the Secretary for Lands and the Secretary for Public Works, which enabled John Robertson to concentrate on what became known as the Robertson Land Acts, William Forster put forward and alternate explanation, that Cowper had created the position and appointed Flood in an unsuccessful attempt to strengthen his parliamentary position. The department had two main functions:

1. The administration of the construction and maintenance of public works, including water supply, sewerage, electricity supply, railways, tramways, roads and electric telegraph; harbours and river navigation, the Civil Engineer (Dry Docks, Cockatoo Island), defence works and the Colonial Architect and
2. A Board which oversaw how tenders for public works were administered.

In 1906 the Secretary assumed responsibility for local government.

== List of secretaries and ministers ==
Title	Minister	Party	Ministry	Term start	Term end	Time in office	Notes
Secretary for Public Works	Edward Flood	No party	Forster	1 October 1859	26 October 1859	25 days	
Secretary for Public Works	Geoffrey Eagar	No party	Forster	27 October 1859	8 March 1860	133 days	
Secretary for Public Works	William Arnold	No party	Robertson (1); Cowper (3)	9 March 1860	15 October 1863	3 years, 220 days	
Secretary for Public Works	Arthur Holroyd	No party	Martin (1)	16 October 1863	2 February 1865	1 year, 109 days	
Secretary for Public Works	William Arnold	No party	Cowper (4)	3 February 1865	19 October 1865	258 days	
Secretary for Public Works	Thomas Smart	No party	Cowper (4)	20 October 1865	21 January 1866	93 days	
Secretary for Public Works	James Byrnes	No party	Martin (2)	22 January 1866	26 October 1868	2 years, 278 days	
Secretary for Public Works	John Sutherland	No party	Robertson (2); Cowper (5)	27 October 1868	15 December 1870	2 years, 49 days	
Secretary for Public Works	James Byrnes	No party	Martin (3)	16 December 1870	13 May 1872	1 year, 149 days	
Secretary for Public Works	John Sutherland	No party	Parkes (1)	14 May 1872	8 February 1875	2 years, 270 days	
Secretary for Public Works	John Lackey	No party	Robertson (3)	9 February 1875	21 March 1877	2 years, 40 days	
Secretary for Public Works	James Hoskins	No party	Parkes (2)	22 March 1877	16 August 1877	147 days	
Secretary for Public Works	Edward Combes	No party	Robertson (4)	17 August 1877	17 December 1877	122 days	
Secretary for Public Works	John Sutherland	No party	Farnell	18 December 1877	20 December 1878	1 year, 2 days	
Secretary for Public Works	John Lackey	No party	Parkes (3)	21 December 1878	4 January 1883	4 years, 14 days	
Secretary for Public Works	Henry Copeland	No party	Stuart	5 January 1883	28 March 1883	82 days	
Secretary for Public Works	Francis Wright	No party	Stuart	28 May 1883	6 October 1885	2 years, 131 days	
Secretary for Public Works	Henry Badgery	No party	Dibbs (1)	7 October 1885	31 October 1885	24 days	
Secretary for Public Works	William Lyne	No party	Dibbs (1)	2 November 1885	21 December 1885	49 days	
Secretary for Public Works	Jacob Garrard	No party	Robertson (5)	22 December 1885	25 February 1886	65 days	
Secretary for Public Works	William Lyne	No party	Jennings	26 February 1886	19 January 1887	327 days	
Secretary for Public Works	John Sutherland	Free Trade	Parkes (4)	20 January 1887	16 January 1889	1 year, 362 days	
Secretary for Public Works	James Fletcher	Protectionist	Dibbs (2)	17 January 1889	7 March 1889	49 days	
Secretary for Public Works	Bruce Smith	Free Trade	Parkes (5)	8 March 1889	13 August 1891	2 years, 158 days	
Secretary for Public Works	James Young	Free Trade	Parkes (5)	14 August 1891	22 October 1891	69 days	
Secretary for Public Works	William Lyne	Protectionist	Dibbs (3)	23 October 1891	2 August 1894	2 years, 283 days	
Secretary for Public Works	James Young	Free Trade	Reid	3 August 1894	3 July 1899	4 years, 334 days	
Secretary for Public Works	Charles Lee	Free Trade	Reid	3 July 1899	13 September 1899	72 days	
Secretary for Public Works	Edward O'Sullivan	Protectionist	Lyne	14 September 1899	27 March 1901	1 year, 194 days	
Secretary for Public Works	Edward O'Sullivan	Progressive	See	28 March 1901	14 June 1904	3 years, 78 days	
Secretary for Public Works	Walter Bennett	Progressive	Waddell	15 June 1904	29 August 1904	75 days	
Secretary for Public Works	Charles Lee	Liberal Reform	Carruthers; Wade	29 August 1904	20 October 1910	6 years, 52 days	
Minister for Public Works	Arthur Griffith	Labor	McGowen; Holman (1)	21 October 1910	15 March 1915	4 years, 145 days	
Minister for Public Works	John Cann	Labor	Holman (1)	15 March 1915	15 November 1916	1 year, 245 days	
Secretary for Public Works	Richard Ball	Nationalist	Holman (2)	15 November 1916	12 April 1920	3 years, 149 days	
Secretary for Public Works	John Estell	Labor	Storey; Dooley (1)	12 April 1920	20 December 1921	1 year, 252 days	
Secretary for Public Works	Sir Thomas Henley	Nationalist	Fuller (1)	20 December 1921	20 December 1921	7 hours	
Secretary for Public Works	John Estell	Labor	Dooley (2)	20 December 1921	13 April 1922	114 days	
Secretary for Public Works	Sir Thomas Henley	Nationalist	Fuller (2)	13 April 1922	19 June 1922	67 days	
Secretary for Public Works	Richard Ball	Nationalist	Fuller (2)	28 June 1922	17 June 1925	2 years, 354 days	
Secretary for Public Works	Martin Flannery	Labor	Lang (1)	17 June 1925	26 May 1927	1 year, 343 days	
Secretary for Public Works	Bill Ratcliffe	Labor	Lang (2)	27 May 1927	18 October 1927	144 days	
Secretary for Public Works	Ernest Buttenshaw	Country	Bavin	18 October 1927	3 November 1930	3 years, 16 days	
Secretary for Public Works	Mat Davidson	Labor	Lang (3)	4 November 1930	15 October 1931	345 days	
Secretary for Public Works	Mat Davidson	Labor (NSW)	Lang (3)	15 October 1931	13 May 1932	211 days	
Secretary for Public Works	Reginald Weaver	United Australia	Stevens (1)	16 May 1932	10 February 1935	2 years, 270 days	
Secretary for Public Works	Bertram Stevens	United Australia	Stevens (2)	10 February 1935	21 August 1935	192 days	
Secretary for Public Works	Eric Spooner	United Australia	Stevens (2) (3)	22 August 1935	21 July 1939	3 years, 333 days	
Secretary for Public Works	Bertram Stevens	United Australia	Mair	21 July 1939	5 August 1939	15 days	
Secretary for Public Works	Alexander Mair	United Australia	Mair	5 August 1939	16 August 1939	11 days	
Secretary for Public Works	Lewis Martin	United Australia	Mair	16 August 1939	16 May 1941	1 year, 273 days	
Secretary for Public Works	Joseph Cahill	Labor	McKell (1) (2); McGirr (1) (2) (3)	16 May 1941	2 April 1952	10 years, 322 days	
Secretary for Public Works	Jack Renshaw	Labor	Cahill (1) (2)	3 April 1952	15 March 1956	3 years, 347 days	
Secretary for Public Works	John McGrath	Labor	Cahill (3)	15 March 1956	1 April 1959	3 years, 17 days	
Minister for Public Works	Norm Ryan	Labor	Cahill (4); Heffron (1) (2); Renshaw	1 April 1959	13 May 1965	6 years, 42 days	
Minister for Public Works	Davis Hughes	Country	Askin (1) (2) (3) (4)	13 May 1965	17 January 1973	7 years, 249 days	
Minister for Public Works	Leon Punch	Country	Askin (5) (6); Lewis (1) (2)	17 January 1973	14 May 1976	3 years, 118 days	
Minister for Public Works	Jack Ferguson	Labor	Wran (1) (2) (3) (4)	14 May 1976	10 February 1984	7 years, 272 days	
Minister for Public Works	Laurie Brereton	Labor	Wran (5) (6) (7)	10 February 1984	6 February 1986	1 year, 361 days	
Minister for Public Works and Ports	Laurie Brereton	Labor	Wran (8); Unsworth	6 February 1986	26 November 1987	1 year, 293 days	
Minister for Public Works	Peter Cox	Labor	Unsworth	26 November 1987	21 March 1988	116 days	
Minister for Public Works	Wal Murray	National	Greiner (1) (2); Fahey (1) (2)	21 March 1988	26 May 1993	5 years, 66 days	
Minister for Public Works	Ian Armstrong	National	Fahey (3)	26 May 1993	4 April 1995	1 year, 313 days	
Minister for Public Works and Services	Michael Knight	Labor	Carr (1)	4 April 1995	15 December 1995	255 days	
Minister for Public Works and Services	Carl Scully	Labor	Carr (1)	15 December 1995	1 December 1997	1 year, 351 days	
Minister for Public Works and Services	Ron Dyer	Labor	Carr (2)	1 December 1997	8 April 1999	1 year, 128 days	
Minister for Public Works and Services	Morris Iemma	Labor	Carr (3)	8 April 1999	2 April 2003	3 years, 359 days	
