= Minister for Transport (New South Wales) =

Cabinet position in New South Wales

- Incumbent; John Graham since 6 February 2025
- Department of Transport
- Style: The Honourable
- Nominator: Premier of New South Wales
- Appointer: Governor of New South Wales
- Term length: At the governor's pleasure
- Inaugural holder: Richard Ball (as Minister for Railways)
- Formation: 15 November 1916 (as Minister for Railways)

The Minister for Transport is a minister in the Government of New South Wales who has responsibilities which include transport policy and regulation, to setting of fares and concessions for rail, ferry, bus and light rail transport, and the administration of maritime facilities in New South Wales, Australia.

The current Minister for Transport has been John Graham since 6 February 2025 following the resignation of Jo Haylen. The Minister for Transport is assisted in the management of the portfolio by:

- Minister for Roads, currently Jenny Aitchison, who has responsibility of the development of road infrastructure and road pricing, and taxi and hire car policy and regulation in the metropolitan parts of the state.
- Minister for Regional Transport, currently Jenny Aitchison, who has responsibilities of the development of road infrastructure and road pricing, and taxi and hire car policy and regulation in the regional parts of the state.

Graham was sworn in on 6 February 2025 as Transport Minister and sworn in on 28 March 2023 as Minister for Roads. Aitchison was sworn in on 5 April 2023 as Minister for Regional Transport and Roads. Together, they administer the portfolio through the Department of Transport (Transport for NSW) and a range of other government agencies that coordinate funding arrangements for transport operators, including hundreds of local and community transport operators.

On 17 March 2025, it was announced that Graham would stay on following his Acting tenure as Minister for Transport.

== Role and responsibilities ==
=== Minister for Railways (1916–1929) ===
The first public railway line in New South Wales was the Sydney–Parramatta Railway which opened on 26 September 1855. Railways were operated by New South Wales Government Railways which was under the supervision of a single Commissioner for Railways until 1888, 3 commissioners until 1907, before returning to a Chief Commissioner from 1907. The Treasurer had ministerial responsibility for railways.

The portfolio of Minister for Railways was created in the Holman Nationalist ministry and had operational responsibility for the railways while the Secretary for Public Works had responsibility for authorising expenditure on any new lines or extensions that exceeded £20,000. The separation however was only at a department level as the portfolio was always held by the Secretary for Public Works.

In the second Fuller ministry the portfolio of Labour and Industry was divided up, with the Minister for Railways receiving the additional responsibilities for state industrial enterprises. The portfolio returned to be the Minister for Railways from the first Lang ministry.

=== Colonial Treasurer and Minister for Transport (1929–present) ===
On 16 April 1929 Ernest Buttenshaw, the Secretary for Public Works and Minister for Railways, became Acting Premier during the absence of Thomas Bavin and resigned the railways portfolio. The ministerial office was not filled and instead the railways department was administered by the Colonial Treasurer. The operation of railways remained the responsibility of the Treasurer in the third Lang ministry until 22 March 1932. The portfolio of Minister for Transport was created under Ministry of Transport Act No. 3, 1932.

== List of ministers ==
=== Transport ===
The following individuals have been appointed as Ministers for Transport, or similar titles.

Ministerial title	Minister	Party	Ministry	Term start	Term end	Time in office	Notes
Minister for Railways	Richard Ball	Nationalist	Holman (2)	15 November 1919	12 April 1920	149 days	
Minister for Railways	John Estell	Labor	Storey; Dooley (1)	12 April 1920	20 December 1921	1 year, 252 days	
Minister for Railways	Sir Thomas Henley	Nationalist	Fuller (1)	20 December 1921 a.m.	20 December 1921 p.m.	7 hours	
Minister for Railways	John Estell	Labor	Dooley (2)	20 December 1921	13 April 1922	114 days	
Minister for Railways and State Industrial Enterprises	Sir Thomas Henley	Nationalist	Fuller (2)	13 April 1922	19 June 1922	67 days	
Minister for Railways and State Industrial Enterprises	Richard Ball	Nationalist	Fuller (2)	28 June 1922	17 June 1925	2 years, 354 days	
Minister for Railways	Martin Flannery	Labor	Lang (1)	17 June 1925	26 May 1927	1 year, 343 days	
Minister for Railways	Bill Ratcliffe	Labor	Lang (2)	27 May 1927	18 October 1927	144 days	
Minister for Railways	Ernest Buttenshaw	Country	Bavin	18 October 1927	16 April 1929	1 year, 180 days	
Minister for Transport	James McGirr	Lang Labor	Lang (3)	22 March 1932	13 May 1932	52 days	
Minister for Transport	Michael Bruxner	Country	Stevens (1) (2) (3); Mair	16 May 1932	16 May 1941	9 years, 3 days	
Minister for Transport	Maurice O'Sullivan	Labor	McKell (1) (2); McGirr (1) (2)	16 May 1941	30 June 1950	9 years, 45 days	
Minister for Transport	Bill Sheahan	Labor	McGirr (3); Cahill (1)	30 June 1950	23 February 1953	2 years, 238 days	
Minister for Transport	Clarrie Martin	Labor	Cahill (2)	23 February 1953	5 September 1953	194 days	
Minister for Transport	Joseph Cahill	Labor	Cahill (2)	7 September 1953	16 September 1953	9 days	
Minister for Transport	Ernest Wetherell	Labor	Cahill (2)	16 September 1953	15 March 1956	2 years, 181 days	
Minister for Transport	George Enticknap	Labor	Cahill (3) (4); Heffron (1)	15 March 1956	31 May 1960	4 years, 76 days	
Minister for Transport	John McMahon	Labor	Heffron (1) (2); Renshaw	31 May 1960	13 May 1965	4 years, 348 days	
Minister for Transport	Milton Morris	Liberal	Askin (1) (2) (3) (4) (5) (6)	13 May 1965	3 January 1975	9 years, 235 days	
Minister for Transport	Wal Fife (Note: Concurrently Minister for Highways)	Liberal	Lewis (1)	3 January 1975	10 October 1975	280 days	
Minister for Transport	Max Ruddock	Liberal	Lewis (1) (2)	10 October 1975	23 January 1976	105 days	
Minister for Transport	Tim Bruxner	Country	Willis	23 January 1976	14 May 1976	112 days	
Minister for Transport	Peter Cox (Note: Concurrently Minister for Highways until 19 October 1978.)	Labor	Wran (1) (2) (3) (4) (5) (6)	14 May 1976	5 April 1984	7 years, 327 days	
Minister for Transport	Barrie Unsworth	Labor	Wran (7) (8)	5 April 1984	6 February 1986	1 year, 307 days	
Minister for Transport	Ron Mulock	Labor	Unsworth	6 February 1986	26 November 1987	1 year, 293 days	
Minister for Transport	Terry Sheahan	Labor	Unsworth	26 November 1987	21 March 1988	116 days	
Minister for Transport	Bruce Baird (Note: Concurrently Minister for Roads from 26 May 1993.)	Liberal	Greiner (1) (2); Fahey (1) (2) (3)	25 March 1988	4 April 1995	7 years, 14 days	
Minister for Transport	Brian Langton	Labor	Carr (1)	4 April 1995	1 December 1997	2 years, 241 days	
Minister for Transport	Carl Scully	Labor	Carr (2) (3)	1 December 1997	2 April 2003	5 years, 122 days	
Minister for Transport Services	Michael Costa	Labor	Carr (4)	2 April 2003	21 January 2005	1 year, 294 days	
Minister for Transport	John Watkins	Labor	Iemma (1) (2)	21 January 2005	8 September 2008	3 years, 231 days	
Minister for Transport	David Campbell	Labor	Rees	8 September 2008	4 December 2009	1 year, 254 days	
Minister for Transport and Roads	David Campbell	Labor	Keneally	8 December 2009	20 May 2010	1 year, 254 days	
Minister for Transport	John Robertson	Labor	Keneally	21 May 2010	28 March 2011	311 days	
Minister for Transport	Gladys Berejiklian	Liberal	O'Farrell; Baird (1)	4 April 2011	1 April 2015	3 years, 362 days	
Minister for Transport and Infrastructure	Andrew Constance	Liberal	Baird (2); Berejiklian (1)	2 April 2015	2 April 2019	6 years, 186 days	
Minister for Transport and Roads	Andrew Constance	Liberal	Berejiklian (2)	2 April 2019	5 October 2021	6 years, 186 days	
Minister for Transport and Roads	Rob Stokes	Liberal	Perrottet (1)	6 October 2021	21 December 2021	76 days	
Minister for Transport	David Elliott	Liberal	Perrottet (2)	21 December 2021	28 March 2023	1 year, 97 days	
Minister for Transport	Jo Haylen	Labor	Minns	28 March 2023	6 February 2025	1 year, 315 days	
Minister for Transport	John Graham	Labor	Minns	6 February 2025	incumbent	1 year, 213 days	

== Former ministerial titles ==
=== Assistant ministers ===
The following individuals have been appointed as Assistant Ministers with responsibility for assisting or advising the Minister for Transport.

Ministerial title	Minister	Party	Ministry	Term start	Term end	Time in office	Notes
Advisory Minister for Transport	Arthur Bridges	Liberal	Askin (1) (2)	13 May 1965	22 May 1968	3 years, 9 days	
Assistant Minister for Transport	Terry Sheahan	Labor	Wran (3)	29 February 1980	2 October 1981	1 year, 216 days	
Assistant Minister for Transport	John Akister	Labor	Unsworth	4 July 1986	21 March 1988	1 year, 261 days	
Assistant Minister for Transport	Janice Crosio	Labor	Unsworth	26 November 1987	21 March 1988	116 days	
Assistant Minister for Transport	Tim Moore	Liberal	Greiner (1)	25 March 1988	18 September 1989	1 year, 177 days	
Assistant Minister for Transport	Matt Singleton	National	Greiner (1)	25 March 1988	24 January 1989	305 days	
Assistant Minister for Transport	Robert Webster	National	Greiner (1)	24 January 1989	24 July 1990	1 year, 181 days	
Assistant Minister for Transport	Bob Rowland Smith	National	Greiner (1)	18 September 1989	24 May 1991	1 year, 248 days	
Minister Assisting the Minister for Transport	Wendy Machin	National	Fahey (3)	6 October 1993	4 April 1995	1 year, 180 days	
Minister Assisting the Minister for Transport	Eric Roozendaal	Labor	Iemma (1)	26 October 2006	2 April 2007	158 days	
Minister Assisting the Minister for Transport	David Borger	Labor	Rees	14 September 2009	4 December 2009	81 days	
Minister Assisting the Minister for Transport and Roads	David Borger	Labor	Keneally	8 December 2009	21 May 2010	164 days	

=== Active Transport ===
Ministerial title	Minister	Party	Ministry	Term start	Term end	Time in office	Notes
Minister for Active Transport	Rob Stokes	Liberal	Perrottet (2)	21 December 2021	28 March 2023	1 year, 97 days	

== See also ==
- List of New South Wales government agencies
