= Minister for Health (New South Wales) =

State government minister in Australia

- Incumbent; Ryan Park since 28 March 2023
- Ministry of Health
- Style: The Honourable
- Nominator: Premier of New South Wales
- Appointer: Governor of New South Wales
- Inaugural holder: Fred Flowers (as the Minister for Public Health)
- Formation: 22 April 1914 (Public Health)

The New South Wales Minister for Health is a minister in the New South Wales Government and has responsibilities which includes all hospitals, health services, and medical research in New South Wales, Australia.

Together they administer the health portfolio through the Health cluster, including the Ministry of Health, its Office of Medical Research, and a range of other government agencies, including local health districts and the NSW Ambulance service.

Ultimately, the ministers are responsible to the Parliament of New South Wales.

== Office history ==
The role of a government advisor and administrator on medical policy in New South Wales began in 1914, with the appointment of Fred Flowers as the Minister for Public Health. However the medical portfolio had been administered in the government since 1848 when the first "Medical Adviser to the Government" was appointed, with his office reporting to the Colonial Secretary. Following the amalgamation of the Board of Health and the Medical Advisor to the Government a "Department of Public Health" was established in April 1904, headed by the President of the Board of Health. This department was abolished in 1913 and was replaced by the "Office of the Director-General of Public Health" which, like its predecessor, operated under the supervision of the Colonial Secretary. Upon Flowers' appointment as Minister for Public Health, a dedicated government minister supervised the portfolio while remaining the junior minister to the Colonial Secretary. The office was reconstituted as a fully independent "Department of Public Health" headed by the Minister (titled Minister for Health since 1930) in 1938.

The department existed until its abolition in 1972 with the passing of the Health Commission Act 1972 which created the "Health Commission of New South Wales" headed by the minister. In December 1982 the Health Commission was abolished by the Health Administration Act 1982 and replaced by the Department of Health. On 5 October 2011 the department was renamed the "Ministry of Health".

== List of ministers ==
=== Health ===
Title	Minister	Party	Ministry	Term start	Term end	Time in office	Notes
Minister for Public Health	Fred Flowers	Labor	Holman (1)	22 April 1914	27 April 1915	1 year, 5 days	
Minister for Public Health	George Black	Labor	Holman (1)	27 April 1915	15 November 1916	1 year, 202 days	
Minister for Public Health	Jack FitzGerald	Nationalist	Holman (2)	15 November 1916	18 July 1919	2 years, 245 days	
Minister for Public Health	David Storey	Nationalist	Holman (2)	18 July 1919	29 January 1920	195 days	
Minister for Public Health and Motherhood	Greg McGirr	Labor	Storey; Dooley (1)	9 February 1920	20 December 1921	1 year, 314 days	
Minister for Public Health	Charles Oakes	Nationalist	Fuller (1)	20 December 1921 a.m.	20 December 1921 p.m.	7 hours	
Minister for Public Health	Greg McGirr	Labor	Dooley (2)	20 December 1921	13 April 1922	114 days	
Minister for Public Health	Charles Oakes	Nationalist	Fuller (2)	12 April 1922	17 June 1925	3 years, 66 days	
Minister for Public Health	George Cann	Labor	Lang (1)	17 June 1925	26 May 1927	1 year, 343 days	
Minister for Public Health	Robert Stuart-Robertson	Labor	Lang (2)	26 May 1927	18 October 1927	145 days	
Minister for Public Health	Richard Arthur	Nationalist	Bavin	18 October 1927	3 November 1930	3 years, 16 days	
Minister for Health	James McGirr	Labor	Lang (3)	4 November 1930	17 June 1931	225 days	
Minister for Health	Bill Ely	Labor	Lang (3)	17 June 1931	15 October 1931	331 days	
Minister for Health	Bill Ely	Lang Labor	Lang (3)	15 October 1931	13 May 1932	331 days	
Minister for Health	Reginald Weaver	United Australia	Stevens (1)	16 May 1932	10 February 1935	2 years, 270 days	
Minister for Health	Herbert FitzSimons	United Australia	Stevens (2) (3)	11 February 1935	5 August 1939	4 years, 175 days	
Minister for Health	Hubert Primrose	United Australia	Mair	5 August 1939	5 September 1939	31 days	
Minister for Health	Herbert FitzSimons	United Australia	Mair	5 September 1939	16 May 1941	1 year, 253 days	
Minister for Health	Gus Kelly	Labor	McKell (1) (2); McGirr (1) (2)	16 May 1941	30 June 1950	9 years, 45 days	
Minister for Health	Maurice O'Sullivan	Labor	McGirr (3); Cahill (1) (2)	30 June 1950	15 March 1956	5 years, 259 days	
Minister for Health	Bill Sheahan	Labor	Cahill (3) (4); Heffron (1) (2); Renshaw	15 March 1956	13 May 1965	9 years, 59 days	
Minister for Health	Harry Jago	Liberal	Askin (1) (2) (3) (4) (5)	13 May 1965	3 December 1973	8 years, 204 days	
Minister for Health	John Waddy	Liberal	Askin (6)	3 December 1973	3 January 1975	1 year, 31 days	
Minister for Health	Dick Healey	Liberal	Lewis (1) (2); Willis	3 January 1975	14 May 1976	1 year, 132 days	
Minister for Health	Kevin Stewart	Labor	Wran (1) (2) (3)	14 May 1976	2 October 1981	5 years, 141 days	
Minister for Health	Laurie Brereton	Labor	Wran (4) (5)	2 October 1981	10 February 1984	3 years, 0 days	
Minister for Health	Ron Mulock	Labor	Wran (6) (7) (8)	10 February 1984	6 February 1986	1 year, 127 days	
Minister for Health	Barrie Unsworth	Labor	Unsworth	6 February 1986	4 July 1986	148 days	
Minister for Health; Minister for the Drug Offensive	Peter Anderson	Labor	Unsworth	4 July 1986	21 March 1988	1 year, 265 days	
Minister for Health	Peter Collins	Liberal	Greiner (1)	25 March 1988	6 June 1991	3 years, 73 days	
Minister for Health and Community Services	John Hannaford	Liberal	Greiner (2); Fahey (1)	6 June 1991	24 June 1992	1 year, 18 days	
Minister for Health	Ron Phillips	Liberal	Fahey (2) (3)	24 June 1992	4 April 1995	2 years, 284 days	
Minister for Health	Andrew Refshauge	Labor	Carr (1) (2)	4 April 1995	8 April 1999	4 years, 4 days	
Minister for Health	Craig Knowles	Labor	Carr (3)	8 April 1999	2 April 2003	3 years, 359 days	
Minister for Health	Morris Iemma	Labor	Carr (4)	2 April 2003	3 August 2005	2 years, 123 days	
Minister for Health	John Hatzistergos	Labor	Iemma (1)	3 August 2005	2 April 2007	1 year, 242 days	
Minister for Health	Reba Meagher	Labor	Iemma (2)	2 April 2007	5 September 2008	1 year, 156 days	
Minister for Health	John Della Bosca	Labor	Rees	5 September 2008	1 September 2009	361 days	
Minister for Health	John Hatzistergos	Labor	Rees	1 September 2009	14 September 2009	13 days	
Minister for Health	Carmel Tebbutt	Labor	Rees; Keneally	14 September 2009	28 March 2011	1 year, 226 days	
Minister for Health	Jillian Skinner	Liberal	O'Farrell; Baird (1) (2)	3 April 2011	30 January 2017	5 years, 302 days	
Minister for Health	Brad Hazzard	Liberal	Berejiklian (1)	30 January 2017	23 March 2019	6 years, 57 days	
Minister for Health and Medical Research	Brad Hazzard	Liberal	Berejiklian (2); Perrottet (1)	2 April 2019	21 December 2021	6 years, 57 days	
Minister for Health	Brad Hazzard	Liberal	Perrottet (2)	21 December 2021	28 March 2023	6 years, 57 days	
Minister for Health and Regional Health	Ryan Park	Labor	Minns	28 March 2023	5 April 2023	3 years, 163 days	
Minister for Health	Ryan Park	Labor	Minns	5 April 2023	incumbent	3 years, 163 days	

=== Mental health ===
Title	Minister	Party	Ministry	Term start	Term end	Time in office	Notes
Minister for Mental Health	Kevin Humphries	National	O'Farrell	4 April 2011	17 April 2014	3 years, 13 days	
Minister for Mental Health	Jai Rowell	Liberal	Baird (1)	17 April 2014	2 April 2015	350 days	
Minister for Mental Health	Pru Goward	Liberal	Baird (2)	2 April 2015	23 January 2017	1 year, 296 days	
Minister for Mental Health	Tanya Davies	Liberal	Berejiklian (1)	30 January 2017	23 March 2019	2 years, 52 days	
Minister for Mental Health, Regional Youth and Women	Bronnie Taylor	National	Berejiklian (2); Perrottet (1)	2 April 2019	21 December 2021	3 years, 360 days	
Minister for Mental Health	Bronnie Taylor	National	Perrottet (2)	21 December 2021	28 March 2023	3 years, 360 days	
Minister for Mental Health	Ryan Park	Labor	Minns	28 March 2023	5 April 2023	8 days	
Minister for Mental Health	Rose Jackson	Labor	Minns	5 April 2023	incumbent	3 years, 155 days	

==== Assistant ministers ====
Title	Minister	Party	Ministry	Term start	Term end	Time in office	Notes
Minister Assisting the Minister for Health (Mental Health)	Cherie Burton	Labor	Iemma (1)	10 August 2005	2 April 2007	1 year, 235 days	
Minister Assisting the Minister for Health (Mental Health)	Paul Lynch	Labor	Iemma (2)	2 April 2007	5 September 2008	1 year, 156 days	
Minister Assisting the Minister for Health (Mental Health)	Barbara Perry	Labor	Rees	8 September 2008	14 September 2009	2 years, 201 days	
Minister Assisting the Minister for Health (Mental Health and Cancer)	Barbara Perry	Labor	Rees	14 September 2009	8 December 2009	2 years, 201 days	
Minister Assisting the Minister for Health (Mental Health)	Barbara Perry	Labor	Keneally	8 December 2009	28 March 2011	2 years, 201 days	

=== Regional health ===
The following individuals have served as Minister for regional health, or any precedent titles:

Title	Minister	Party	Ministry	Term start	Term end	Time in office	Notes
Minister for Regional Health	Bronnie Taylor	National	Perrottet (2)	21 December 2021	28 March 2023	1 year, 97 days	
Minister for Health and Regional Health	Ryan Park	Labor	Minns	28 March 2023	5 April 2023	3 years, 163 days	
Minister for Regional Health	Ryan Park	Labor	Minns	5 April 2023	incumbent	3 years, 163 days	

=== Medical research ===
Title	Minister	Party	Ministry	Term start	Term end	Time in office	Notes
Minister for Science and Medical Research	Frank Sartor	Labor	Carr (4); Iemma (1)	2 April 2003	2 April 2007	4 years, 0 days	
Minister for Science and Medical Research	Verity Firth	Labor	Iemma (2)	2 April 2007	5 September 2008	1 year, 159 days	
Minister for Science and Medical Research	Tony Stewart	Labor	Rees	8 September 2008	4 November 2008	57 days	
Minister for Science and Medical Research	Jodi McKay	Labor	Rees; Keneally	4 November 2008	28 March 2011	2 years, 144 days	
Minister for Medical Research	Jillian Skinner (Note: Concurrently held the Health portfolio.)	Liberal	O'Farrell; Baird (1)	3 April 2011	2 April 2015	3 years, 364 days	
Minister for Medical Research	Pru Goward	Liberal	Baird (2)	2 April 2015	30 January 2017	1 year, 303 days	
Minister for Medical Research	Brad Hazzard	Liberal	Berejiklian (1)	30 January 2017	23 March 2019	4 years, 325 days	
Minister for Health and Medical Research	Brad Hazzard	Liberal	Berejiklian (2); Perrottet (1)	2 April 2019	21 December 2021	4 years, 325 days	
Minister for Medical Research	David Harris	Labor	Minns	5 April 2023	incumbent	3 years, 155 days	

== Former ministerial titles ==
=== Assistant ministers ===
Title	Minister	Party	Ministry	Term start	Term end	Time in office	Notes
Assistant Minister for Health	Deirdre Grusovin	Labor	Unsworth	26 November 1987	21 March 1988	116 days	
Assistant Minister for Health	Jim Longley	Liberal	Fahey (2)	3 July 1992	26 May 1993	327 days	
Assistant Minister for Health	Jai Rowell	Liberal	Baird (2)	23 April 2014	2 April 2015	344 days	
Assistant Minister for Health	Pru Goward	Liberal	Berejiklian (1)	2 April 2015	30 January 2017	1 year, 303 days	

=== Hospitals ===
Title	Minister	Party	Ministry	Term start	Term end	Time in office	Notes
Minister for Hospital Management	Ron Phillips	Liberal	Greiner (2)	6 June 1991	26 June 1991	20 days	
Minister for Health Services Management	Ron Phillips	Liberal	Fahey (1)	26 June 1991	24 June 1992	364 days	

=== Cancer ===
Title	Minister	Party	Ministry	Term start	Term end	Time in office	Notes
Minister Assisting the Minister for Health (Cancer)	Frank Sartor	Labor	Carr (4); Iemma (1)	2 April 2003	2 April 2007	4 years, 0 days	
Minister Assisting the Minister for Health (Cancer)	Verity Firth	Labor	Iemma (2)	2 April 2007	5 September 2008	1 year, 156 days	
Minister Assisting the Minister for Health (Cancer)	Tony Stewart	Labor	Rees	8 September 2008	4 November 2008	57 days	
Minister Assisting the Minister for Health (Cancer)	Jodi McKay	Labor	Rees	4 November 2008	4 December 2009	1 year, 30 days	
Minister Assisting the Minister for Health (Cancer)	Frank Sartor	Labor	Keneally	8 December 2009	28 March 2011	1 year, 110 days	

=== Healthy lifestyles ===
Title	Minister	Party	Ministry	Term start	Term end	Time in office	Notes
Minister for Healthy Lifestyles	Kevin Humphries	National	O'Farrell	3 April 2011	17 April 2014	3 years, 14 days	

== See also ==
- List of New South Wales government agencies
