= Fahey–Murray ministry (1992) =

82nd New South Wales government ministry, led by John Fahey

First Fahey–Murray ministry
- 82nd Cabinet of Government of New South Wales
- Date formed: 24 June 1992
- Date dissolved: 3 July 1992

People and organisations
- Monarch: Queen Elizabeth II
- Governor: Peter Sinclair
- Premier: John Fahey
- Deputy Premier: Wal Murray
- No. of ministers: 17
- Member party: Liberal–National coalition
- Status in legislature: Minority Coalition Government
- Opposition parties: Labor
- Opposition leader: Bob Carr

History
- Outgoing formation: –
- Predecessor: Second Greiner–Murray ministry
- Successor: Second Fahey ministry

The Fahey–Murray ministry (1992) or First Fahey–Murray ministry or First Fahey ministry was the 82nd ministry of the New South Wales Government, and was led by the 38th Premier of New South Wales, John Fahey, representing the Liberal Party in coalition with the National Party, led by Wal Murray.

== Composition of ministry ==
The term of this ministry is just nine days, from 24 June 1992, when Fahey was elected to succeed Nick Greiner as Leader of the New South Wales Liberal Party and hence became Premier; until 3 July 1992, when Fahey reconstituted the ministry. Ministers are listed in order of seniority.

Portfolio	Minister	Party	Term commence	Term end	Term of office
Premier	John Fahey	Liberal	24 June 1992	3 July 1992	9 days
Treasurer	John Fahey	Liberal	24 June 1992	3 July 1992	9 days
Minister for Industrial Relations (Note: Retained portfolio from the second Greiner ministry.)	John Fahey	Liberal	24 June 1992	3 July 1992	9 days
Minister for Further Education, Training and Employment	John Fahey	Liberal	24 June 1992	3 July 1992	9 days
Minister for Ethnic Affairs	John Fahey	Liberal	24 June 1992	3 July 1992	9 days
Deputy Premier	Wal Murray	National	24 June 1992	3 July 1992	9 days
Minister for Public Works	Wal Murray	National	24 June 1992	3 July 1992	9 days
Minister for Roads	Wal Murray	National	24 June 1992	3 July 1992	9 days
Minister for Transport	Bruce Baird	Liberal	24 June 1992	3 July 1992	9 days
Minister for the Environment	Bruce Baird	Liberal	24 June 1992	3 July 1992	9 days
Attorney General	Peter Collins	Liberal	24 June 1992	3 July 1992	9 days
Minister for Consumer Affairs	Peter Collins	Liberal	24 June 1992	3 July 1992	9 days
Minister for the Arts	Peter Collins	Liberal	24 June 1992	3 July 1992	9 days
Minister for Agriculture and Rural Affairs	Ian Armstrong	National	24 June 1992	3 July 1992	9 days
Minister for Housing	Joe Schipp	Liberal	24 June 1992	3 July 1992	9 days
Minister for Conservation and Land Management	Garry West	National	24 June 1992	3 July 1992	9 days
Minister for Police and Emergency Services	Ted Pickering, MLC	Liberal	24 June 1992	3 July 1992	9 days
Vice-President of the Executive Council; Leader of the Government in Legislative Council	Ted Pickering, MLC	Liberal	24 June 1992	3 July 1992	9 days
Minister for School Education and Youth Affairs	Virginia Chadwick, MLC	Liberal	24 June 1992	3 July 1992	9 days
Minister for Local Government	Gerry Peacocke	National	24 June 1992	3 July 1992	9 days
Minister for Cooperatives	Gerry Peacocke	National	24 June 1992	3 July 1992	9 days
Minister for Natural Resources	Ian Causley	National	24 June 1992	3 July 1992	9 days
Minister for Planning	Robert Webster, MLC	National	24 June 1992	3 July 1992	9 days
Minister for Energy	Robert Webster, MLC	National	24 June 1992	3 July 1992	9 days
Minister for State Development	Robert Webster, MLC	National	24 June 1992	3 July 1992	9 days
Minister for Tourism	Robert Webster, MLC	National	24 June 1992	3 July 1992	9 days
Minister for Health and Community Services	John Hannaford, MLC	Liberal	24 June 1992	3 July 1992	9 days
Minister for Health Services Management	Ron Phillips	Liberal	24 June 1992	3 July 1992	9 days
Minister for Justice	Terry Griffiths	Liberal	24 June 1992	3 July 1992	9 days
Minister for Sport, Recreation and Racing	George Souris	National	24 June 1992	3 July 1992	9 days
Minister Assisting the Premier	George Souris	National	24 June 1992	3 July 1992	9 days
Chief Secretary	Anne Cohen	Liberal	24 June 1992	3 July 1992	9 days
Minister for Administrative Services	Anne Cohen	Liberal	24 June 1992	3 July 1992	9 days

Ministers are members of the Legislative Assembly unless otherwise noted.

== See also ==
- Members of the New South Wales Legislative Assembly, 1991–1995
- Members of the New South Wales Legislative Council, 1991–1995

== Notes ==
New South Wales government ministries
Preceded by Second Greiner–Murray ministry (1991–1992)	First Fahey–Murray ministry 1992	Succeeded by Second Fahey–Murray ministry (1992–1993)
