= Jack Mannix =

Australian politician

The Honourable Jack Mannix

Minister for Justice
- In office 31 May 1960 – 13 May 1965
- Premier: Bob Heffron; Jack Renshaw
- Preceded by: Reg Downing
- Succeeded by: John Maddison

Personal details
- Born: 16 August 1920 Armidale, New South Wales, Australia
- Died: 17 June 1994 (aged 73) Liverpool, New South Wales, Australia
- Party: Labor Party

Norman John Mannix (16 August 1920 – 17 June 1994) was an Australian politician and a member of the New South Wales Legislative Assembly from 1952 until 1971 . He was a member of the Labor Party and held the position of Justice Minister (in charge of NSW gaols) between 1960 and 1965.

== Early and personal life ==
Mannix was born in Armidale, New South Wales He was the son of a salesman and was educated at De La Salle College, Armidale. He initially worked as a clerk in the NSW public service and studied law in his spare time. He was the chief clerk in the Department of Housing prior to his election to parliament. Mannix was called to the bar in 1955. He became involved in community organizations in the Liverpool area including the local hospital board and the co-operative building society. In 1972 he was appointed Secretary by the board of the Intellectually & Physically Handicapped Children's Association a role he held for more than 20 years.

== State Parliament ==
Mannix was elected as the Labor member for Liverpool at the 1952 by-election caused by the resignation of the former premier James McGirr who resigned from parliament to accept the chairmanship of the Maritime Services Board. He retained the seat for the next 6 elections and retired at the 1971 election.

== Government ==
Mannix held ministerial positions in the governments of Robert Heffron and Jack Renshaw. He was initially appointed as an assistant minister in 1959 and held the Justice portfolio between 1960 and the defeat of the Labor government in 1965.

New South Wales Legislative Assembly
Preceded by James McGirr	Member for Liverpool; 1952 – 1971	Succeeded by George Paciullo
Political offices
Preceded by Reg Downing	Minister for Justice; 1960 – 1965	Succeeded by John Maddison
