= Francis Buckley (politician) =

Australian politician

Francis Patrick Buckley CBE (25 September 1894 – 3 April 1971) was an Australian politician.

He was born in Dubbo, the son of woolclasser Timothy Buckley. He was educated at a convent in Cobar, and in 1911 moved to Sydney, where he was a barber and active in the Hairdressers and Wigmakers Employees' Union, of which he was vice-president in 1919 and president in 1920. On 17 May 1919 he married Ethel Mary Dunn, with whom he had three daughters. He was an organiser for his union from 1922 to 1942 and served as secretary from 1942 to 1953; he also served as an alderman at Marrickville from 1925 to 1948 (mayor from 1942 to 1943) and on Sydney City Council from 1950 to 1953. From 1946 to 1954 he was a Labor member of the New South Wales Legislative Council; he was also president of the state branch of the Labor Party from 1951 to 1952, an assistant minister from 1952 to 1953, and Secretary for Mines from 1953 to 1954. In 1954 he resigned from the council to become Agent-General for New South Wales in London, where he remained until 1965, being appointed a Commander of the Order of the British Empire in 1959. Buckley died at Kirribilli in 1971.

Civic offices
Preceded by Frank Broome Wright	Mayor of Marrickville; 1941–1943	Succeeded by Donald Cochrane
Party political offices
Preceded by	President of the Australian Labor Party (NSW Branch); 1951–1952	Succeeded by
Political offices
Preceded by Bob Heffron	Secretary for Mines; 1953–1954	Succeeded by William Gollan
Diplomatic posts
Preceded by Jack Tully	Agent-General for New South Wales; 1954–1965	Succeeded by Abe Landa
