= John McGrath (New South Wales politician) =

Australian politician

The Honourable John McGrath

Secretary for Public Works
- In office 15 March 1956 – 1 April 1959
- Premier: Joseph Cahill
- Preceded by: Jack Renshaw
- Succeeded by: Norm Ryan

Deputy Mayor of Bexley
- In office 6 December 1938 – 9 December 1941
- Mayor: Joseph Barwell; Archibald Macdonald
- Preceded by: Joseph Barwell
- Succeeded by: Ernest Docos

Alderman of the Bexley Municipal Council
- In office 9 January 1937 – 2 December 1944
- Preceded by: George Dunstan

Personal details
- Born: 1 September 1893 Chicago, Illinois, United States
- Died: 20 December 1971 (aged 78) Darlinghurst, New South Wales, Australia
- Party: Labor

John Francis McGrath (1 September 1893 – 20 December 1971) was an Australian politician and a member of the New South Wales Legislative Assembly from 1941 until 1959. He was a member of the NSW Branch of the Australian Labor Party and held a number of ministerial positions including Minister for Housing.

== Early life and career ==
McGrath was born in Chicago, the son of a publican and migrated with his family to Australia at age nine. He was educated at St Aloysius' College and initially worked as an electrician. He became an official of the Electrical Trades Union but left the industry to become a hotel owner. After owning several hotels, including losing one in Rockdale during the Great Depression, McGrath leased the Bexley Hotel and became a proprietor of other hotels in the Bexley area. McGrath was soon active in community organisations, becoming president of Bexley Chamber of Commerce from 1936 until 1970. McGrath was elected as an alderman on the Bexley Municipal Council at a by-election in 1937, and served until 1944. He was the deputy mayor for three terms in 1938–1941 and served as a Bexley delegate on the St George County Council.

== Political career ==
McGrath was the defeated ALP candidate at the 1939 by-election for the seat of Hurstville which was won by Clive Evatt of the Industrial Labor Party. He was eventually elected to the New South Wales parliament as the Labor member for new seat of Rockdale at the 1941 election. He retained the seat for the next five elections and retired at the 1959 election. In 1947, he was elected Government Whip and served until his promotion to the cabinet in 1953.

McGrath held ministerial positions in the government of Joseph Cahill. He was a Minister without portfolio in 1953, and was appointed the Minister for Housing in 1954 and the Secretary for Public Works from 1956 until his retirement. In this role he was responsible for the early construction work on the Sydney Opera House.

Civic offices
Preceded by Joseph Barwell	Deputy Mayor of Bexley; 1938 – 1941	Succeeded by Ernest Docos
New South Wales Legislative Assembly
New district	Member for Rockdale; 1941 – 1959	Succeeded by Brian Bannon
Political offices
Preceded by Gus Kelly	Minister for Housing; 1954 – 1956	Succeeded by Abe Landa
Preceded by Jack Renshaw	Secretary for Public Works; 1956 – 1959	Succeeded by Norm Ryan as Minister for Public Works
