= Maurice O'Sullivan (politician) =

Australian politician

The Honorable Maurice O'Sullivan
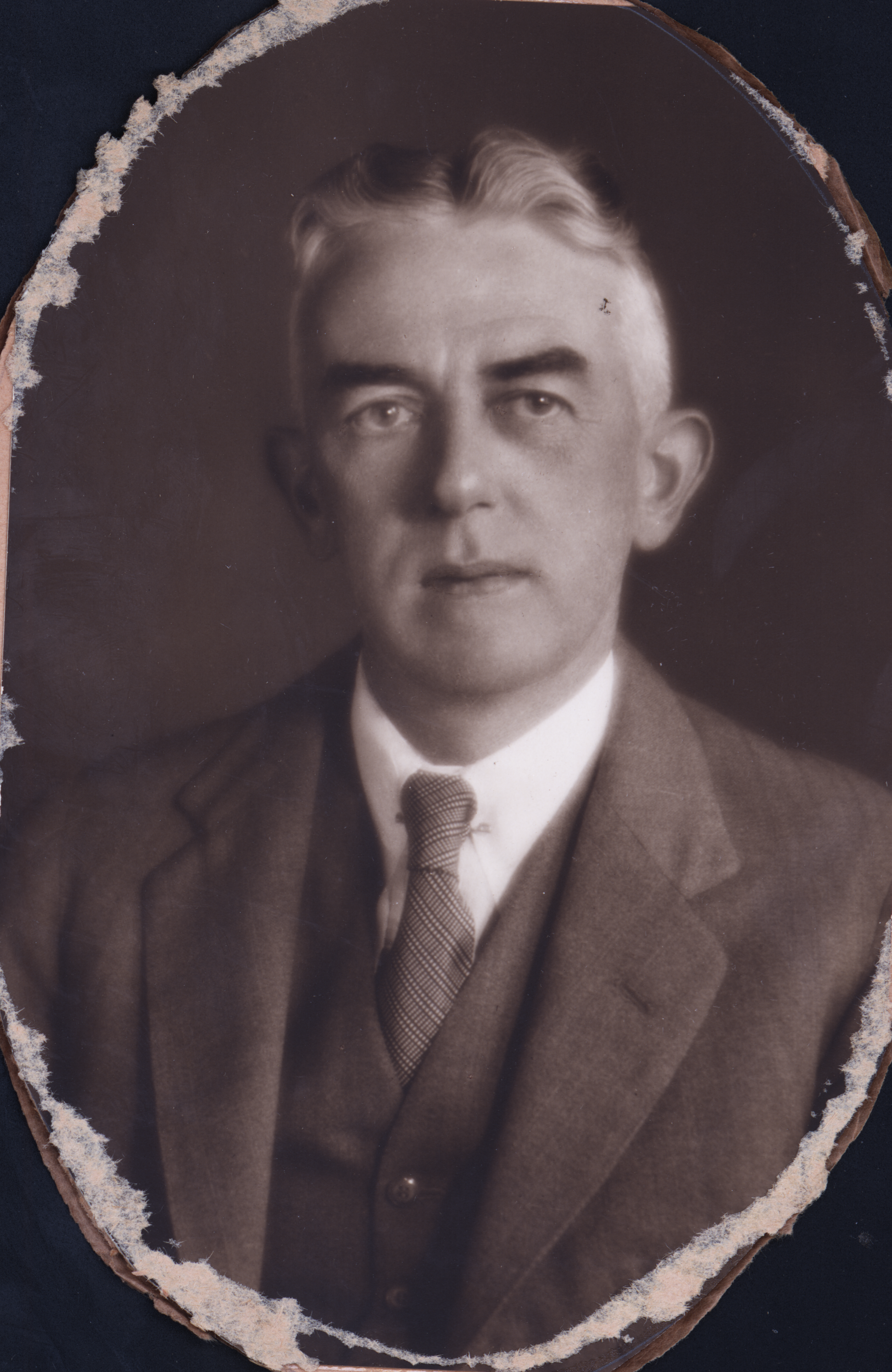

Minister for Health
- In office 30 June 1950 – 15 March 1956
- Preceded by: Gus Kelly
- Succeeded by: Bill Sheahan

Minister for Transport
- In office 16 May 1941 – 30 June 1950
- Preceded by: Michael Bruxner
- Succeeded by: Bill Sheahan

Member of the New South Wales Parliament for Woollahra
- In office 8 October 1927 – 18 September 1930
- Preceded by: Restored seat
- Succeeded by: Sir Daniel Levy

Member of the New South Wales Parliament for Paddington
- In office 25 October 1930 – 16 February 1959
- Preceded by: Sir Daniel Levy
- Succeeded by: Seat abolished

Personal details
- Born: 5 October 1892 Paddington, New South Wales
- Died: 25 August 1972 (aged 79) Sydney, New South Wales
- Party: Labor

Maurice O'Sullivan (5 October 1892 – 25 August 1972), an Australian politician, was a member of the New South Wales Legislative Assembly from 1927 until 1959. He was variously a member of the Australian Labor Party (NSW) and the Labor Party. He held numerous ministerial positions between 1941 and 1956 including Minister for Health and Minister for Transport.

== Early life ==
O'Sullivan was born in Paddington, New South Wales and was the son of a publican. He was educated at the Christian Brother's School, Paddington and initially worked as an apprentice coach painter with the New South Wales Government Railways. He became active in the Federated Coachmakers' Employees Union but took over the licence of his father's hotel, The Lord Dudley, and then continued in a career as a publican. He was active in community organizations in the Paddington area and was elected as an alderman on Paddington Municipal Council between 1923 and 1934. He was the mayor in 1927

== State Parliament ==
O'Sullivan was elected to parliament at the 1927 election for the newly re-established seat of Woollahra. Due to a redistribution the seat became untenable for Labor at the 1930 election and he transferred to the seat of Paddington. The sitting Nationalist member for Paddington, Daniel Levy, successfully contested Woolahra. O'Sullivan retained Paddington at the next 9 elections and retired from parliament at the 1959 election . He was a member of the Australian Labor Party (NSW) while that party was separated from the Federal executive of the Labor Party between 1931 and 1936 and was the party whip from 1932 till 1941.

With the election of the Labor government of William McKell at the 1941 election, O'Sullivan was appointed Minister for Transport, a position he retained until 1950. As Minister for Transport, O'Sullivan drew criticism in 1949 over his handling of smoking on public transport. When asked in the Legislative Assembly about passengers smoking in non-smoking compartments on trams, buses, and trains, he admitted he did not know how to prevent the practice and said he would "hate to introduce the American idea" of no-smoking police. Despite fines of £2 being available, prosecutions were rare. The Tramways Union's Mr. W. P. Best also noted that O'Sullivan had stated conductors were not supposed to smoke on duty, though O'Sullivan "knew they did," and that drivers and conductors were instead subject to internal discipline including reprimands and loss of holiday time.

He was then commissioned as the Minister for Health and he stayed in this post until 1956. He retired in 1959.

Civic offices
| Preceded by Harold Falvey | Mayor of Paddington; 1926–1927 | Succeeded by Henry Dickinson |
New South Wales Legislative Assembly
| Preceded by restored seat | Member for Woollahra; 1927 – 1930 | Succeeded by Sir Daniel Levy |
| Preceded by Sir Daniel Levy | Member for Paddington; 1930 – 1959 | Succeeded by seat abolished |
Political offices
| Preceded by Michael Bruxner | Minister for Transport; 1941 – 1950 | Succeeded by Bill Sheahan |
| Preceded by Gus Kelly | Minister for Health; 1950 – 1956 | Succeeded by Bill Sheahan |
