= Norm Ryan =

Australian politician

The Honourable Norm Ryan

Minister for Public Works
- In office 1 April 1959 – 13 May 1965
- Premier: Joseph Cahill; Bob Heffron; Jack Renshaw
- Preceded by: John McGrath
- Succeeded by: Davis Hughes

Member of the New South Wales Parliament for Marrickville
- In office 14 February 1953 – 19 October 1973
- Preceded by: Carlo Lazzarini
- Succeeded by: Thomas Cahill

Personal details
- Born: Phillip Norman Ryan; 24 May 1910 Moruya, New South Wales, Australia
- Died: 25 March 1997 (aged 86) Killarney Vale, New South Wales, Australia
- Party: Australian Labor Party (New South Wales Branch)
- Spouse: Dorothy O'Brien
- Occupation: Electrical Fitter

Phillip Norman Ryan (24 May 1910 – 25 March 1997) was an Australian politician, affiliated with the Labor Party. He was elected as a member of the New South Wales Legislative Assembly and served as Minister for Public Works from 1959 to 1965.

== Early life ==
He was born at Moruya, on the south coast of New South Wales to Michael and Elizabeth Ryan. After attending St. Joseph's College, Hunters Hill and the Sydney Technical College, he was an apprentice electrical fitter for the Sydney County Council. He later worked as an electrical inspector for the Public Works Department. On 12 April 1941, he married Dorothy O'Brien, with whom he had one son and one daughter.

== Political career ==
Having joined the Labor Party in 1933, Ryan became an alderman to Marrickville Council in 1948 at the age of 38. He was elected Mayor of Marrickville in 1953, but resigned later that year when elected to the Legislative Assembly as member for Marrickville. As well as representing this electorate in Sydney's inner west, he was known as an advocate for providing services to the rural areas of the state.

Ryan's most significant achievements were as Minister for Public Works in the Heffron and Renshaw governments from 1959. In this role, he was involved in the first part of the construction of the Sydney Opera House. Amidst much criticism concerning the rising costs, he stood firm in support of the project, saying in 1964 "This building will bring great credit upon this country."

== Later life and career ==
The Labor Party lost office in the 1965 election, and so Ryan's term as Minister came to an end. He continued to serve as the member for Marrickville, being elected a total of seven times. He also served as a trustee of the Art Gallery of New South Wales, a position he had taken up in 1959, until 1972. His retirement came, after 20 years in parliament, at the 1973 election, when he offered to stand aside for the younger Tom Cahill, whose neighbouring seat had been abolished. He died 24 years later at Killarney Vale, on the central coast.

Civic offices
Preceded by L. A. Scutts	Mayor of Marrickville; 1952 – 1953	Succeeded by William Murray
New South Wales Legislative Assembly
Preceded by Carlo Lazzarini	Member for Marrickville; 1953 – 1973	Succeeded by Tom Cahill
Political offices
Preceded by John McGrath as Secretary for Public Works	Minister for Public Works; 1959 – 1965	Succeeded by Davis Hughes
