= Jim Maloney (politician) =

Australian politician and diplomat

The Honourable Jim Maloney

Australian Minister to the Soviet Union
- In office 5 November 1943 – 12 August 1946
- Preceded by: Bill Slater
- Succeeded by: Noël Deschamps

Minister for Labour and Industry
- In office 15 March 1956 – 13 May 1965
- Premier: Joseph Cahill; Bob Heffron; Jack Renshaw
- Preceded by: Abe Landa
- Succeeded by: Eric Willis

Member of the New South Wales Legislative Council
- In office 13 August 1941 – 16 February 1972
- Preceded by: Frank Wall
- Succeeded by: Ted Humphries

Personal details
- Born: 26 June 1901 Goulburn, New South Wales, Australia
- Died: 28 January 1982 (aged 80) Kogarah, New South Wales, Australia
- Party: Australian Labor Party (New South Wales Branch)

James Joseph Maloney (26 June 1901 – 28 January 1982) was an Australian Labor politician and diplomat.

== Early life and career ==
He was born in Goulburn to baker James Moloney and Mary Ann Pickels. He was educated locally and became a messenger boy, subsequently moving to Sydney to become a bootmaker. On 19 April 1924 he married Emily Dent, with whom he had four children.

He had joined the Labor Party and the Australian Boot Trade Employees' Federation in 1915; he was New South Wales secretary of the union from 1932 to 1943, federal president from 1936 to 1940 and federal secretary from 1940 to 1943.

He was also a delegate to the Trades and Labor Council from 1927 to 1943, an executive member from 1930 to 1943, and president from 1940 to 1943.

== Political and diplomatic career ==
From 1941 to 1972 he was a Labor member of the New South Wales Legislative Council; during this period he was a Minister without Portfolio from 1954 to 1956 and Minister for Labour and Industry from 1956 to 1965. From 1966 to 1971 he was Deputy Leader of the Opposition.

Prime Minister John Curtin appointed him the Australian Minister to the Soviet Union between December 1943 and February 1946. He was granted leave of absence from the Legislative Council to take up this post.

== Later life ==
Maloney died at Kogarah in 1982.

Parliament of New South Wales
Preceded by Frank Wall	Member of the New South Wales Legislative Council; 1941 – 1972	Succeeded by Ted Humphries
Diplomatic posts
Preceded by Bill Slater	Australian Minister to the Soviet Union; 1943 – 1946	Succeeded by Noël Deschamps as Chargé d'Affaires
Political offices
Preceded by Abe Landa	Minister for Labour and Industry; 1956 – 1965	Succeeded by Eric Willis
New title	Deputy Leader of the Opposition in the Legislative Council; 1966 – 1971	Succeeded by Neville Wran
