= Reg Downing =

Australian politician (1904–1994)

The Honourable Reg Downing AC QC
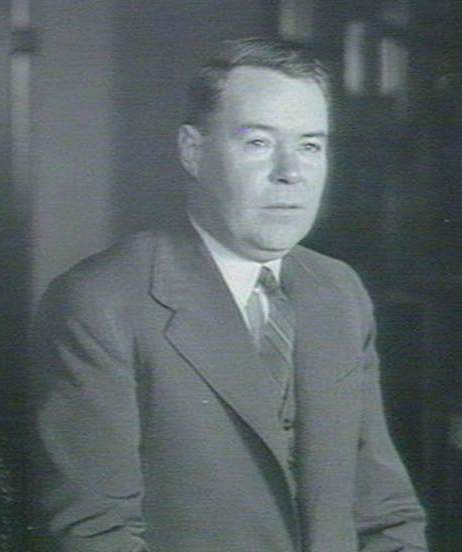

Attorney General of New South Wales
- In office 15 March 1956 – 13 May 1965
- Premier: Joseph Cahill; Bob Heffron; Jack Renshaw
- Preceded by: Bill Sheahan
- Succeeded by: Ken McCaw

Leader of the New South Wales Opposition in the Legislative Council
- In office 13 May 1965 – 4 February 1972
- Preceded by: Arthur Bridges
- Succeeded by: Neville Wran

Member of the Legislative Council of New South Wales
- In office 23 April 1940 – 4 February 1972
- Succeeded by: John Ducker

Personal details
- Born: 6 November 1904 Tumut, New South Wales, Australia
- Died: 9 September 1994 (aged 89) Goulburn, New South Wales, Australia
- Party: Labor Party
- Spouse: Rose Moyeen
- Relations: Frank Downing (Brother); Thomas O'Mara (Cousin); Bill Sheahan (Cousin); Terry Sheahan (Cousin)

Robert Reginald Downing, AC, QC (6 November 1904 – 9 September 1994) was an Australian lawyer, textile worker, union organiser and politician. He was a member of the New South Wales Legislative Council for the Labor Party for 31 years from 1940 to 1972 and also served as the Attorney General, Minister for Justice and Vice-President of the Executive Council from 1941 to 1965.

== Early years and background ==
Robert Reginald Downing was born in the New South Wales town of Tumut in 1904, the son of council worker Robert Downing and Frances Jean Galvin. The cousin of former member of the New South Wales Legislative Assembly for Tumut, Thomas O'Mara as well as future NSW Attorneys General, Bill Sheahan and Terry Sheahan, Downing's younger brother, Francis George Downing, would also join the NSW Parliament as an MP for Ryde. Initially educated at the Tumut convent school and St Patrick's College, Goulburn, Downing left school at age 15 and worked to support his family.

Later moving to Sydney, he found work in the Bonds textile factory. It was here that he joined the Australian Textile Workers' Union, rising to become a union organiser and eventually state president from 1928 until 1934. Rising further to be New South Wales secretary and federal president (1934–1941) as well as a trustee of the Labor Council, Downing soon joined the Labor Party, becoming president of Gladesville Branch. On 11 April 1932 he married Rose Moyeen Ashcroft and had one daughter and two sons. Intending to finish his education that he left as a 15-year-old, Downing matriculated at the University of Sydney in 1938. He then proceeded to study law, graduating with a Bachelor of Laws in 1943 and being called to the New South Wales bar the same year.

== Political career ==
As a high-ranking unionist and a senior member of the Labor Council of New South Wales, Downing became heavily associated with the movement within the Labor Party led by Bob Heffron to depose the party leader, Jack Lang. Heffron's strategy was based largely upon a left-wing trade union rebellion against Lang. Although Downing was sympathetic towards Heffron, he remained firmly behind the party and was a close friend to William McKell, who would successfully depose Lang in 1939.

At the encouragement of McKell, Downing stood for preselection in the New South Wales Legislative Council and in 1940 was duly elected. When the conservative United Australia Party government of Alexander Mair was brought down at the 1941 election, Downing, while still studying for his law degree, was appointed on 16 May 1941 by Premier McKell as Minister for Justice and Vice-President of the Executive Council. He would go on to serve during the entire period of Labor government as vice-president of the Executive Council for 24 years and Minister of Justice for 19 years to 1956 when he was made Attorney General.

His significant tenure as minister during this period included reforms in consumer law and women's rights as well as the establishment of the Suitors Fund and law reform committees, which were the predecessors to the Law Reform Commission. Downing also actively pursued the abolition of capital punishment in New South Wales, leading to its abolition for murder cases in 1955. Emphasising rehabilitation, he reformed the prison system, setting up the Parole Board and the Adult Probation Service, and appointing a consulting psychiatrist to the Prisons Department.

However, serving during a period of moral conservatism and malevolent homophobia, Downing presided over an increase on official action against homosexuality in government and the NSW Police Force Vice Squad. Downing also acted to establish a parliamentary committee to investigate the incidence of homosexuality in society, remarking: "The public will realise how difficult it is to recognise and identify homosexuals when it is recalled that many of these offenders before the Court are persons who have held responsible positions and were otherwise of unblemished character. All expert opinion here and overseas is that it is difficult to recognise offenders." In 1951, with the support of Police Commissioner Colin Delaney, noted for his obsession against homosexuality, Downing moved an amendment to the Crimes Act 1900 to ensure that "buggery" remained a criminal act "with or without the consent of the person", removing the previously existing legal loophole of consent. Downing also successfully lobbied for the reopening of Cooma Correctional Centre in 1957, as a correctional institution specifically for men convicted of homosexual sex. He also established a committee to study the men incarcerated there for the purpose of finding the "causes and treatments of homosexuality".

He served as Attorney General until the Labor government of Jack Renshaw lost to the Liberal/Country party Coalition of Robert Askin in 1965. Thereafter, Downing, who had previous served as the Leader of the Government in the Legislative Council, became the Leader of the New South Wales Opposition in the Legislative Council, a role in which he would serve until his retirement from politics.

== Later life and honours ==
While in parliament, Downing was foundation member of the New South Wales Cancer Council and was very active within the Australian Cancer Society, becoming its president from 1969 to 1972, and also as a trustee of Taronga Park Zoo from 1942 until 1972. Downing retired from the legislative council after thirty-one years in February 1972 and returned to legal practice, being appointed a Queen's Counsel (QC) in 1973.

In recognition of his service to NSW and to the university as a Fellow from 1949 to 1967, the University of Sydney conferred upon him an Honorary Doctor of Laws (Hon.LLD) on 3 June 1972. On 11 June 1979, he was invested as a Companion of the Order of Australia (AC) "In recognition of service to politics and government". In 1991, the newly refurbished courts building in Elizabeth Street, Sydney was named the "Downing Centre" in his honour. The owner of a 283-hectare (700-acre) sheep property outside Goulburn, Downing lived there in quiet retirement until his death aged 89 on 9 September 1994.

Political offices
| Preceded by Henry Manning | Representative of the Government in the Legislative Council; 1941 – 1965 | Succeeded by Arthur Bridges as Leader of the Government |
| Preceded by Henry Manning | Vice-President of the Executive Council; 1941 – 1965 | Succeeded by Arthur Bridges as Leader of the Government |
| Preceded by Vernon Treatt | Minister for Justice; 1941 – 1956 | Succeeded by Jack Mannix |
| Preceded by Bill Sheahan | Attorney General of New South Wales; 1956 – 1965 | Succeeded by Ken McCaw |
| Preceded by Arthur Bridges | Leader of the Opposition of New South Wales in the Legislative Council; 1965 – 1972 | Succeeded by Neville Wran |
Party political offices
| Preceded by James Concannon | Leader of the Labor Party in the Legislative Council; 1941 – 1972 | Succeeded by Neville Wran |
