= Ernest Wetherell =

Australian politician

The Honourable Ernest Wetherell

Minister for Education
- In office 31 May 1960 – 13 May 1965
- Premier: Robert Heffron; Jack Renshaw
- Preceded by: Robert Heffron
- Succeeded by: Charles Cutler

Minister for Transport
- In office 16 September 1953 – 15 March 1956
- Premier: Joseph Cahill
- Preceded by: Clarrie Martin
- Succeeded by: George Enticknap

Member of the New South Wales Parliament for Cobar
- In office 12 March 1949 – 31 March 1965
- Preceded by: Mat Davidson
- Succeeded by: Lew Johnstone

Personal details
- Born: 26 March 1893 near Mount Egerton, Colony of Victoria
- Died: 31 March 1969 (aged 76) Sydney, New South Wales, Australia
- Party: Labor Party
- Spouse: Florence Scott
- Children: William, Maureen and Thomas
- Occupation: Miner, unionist, journalist

Ernest "Ern" Wetherell (26 March 1893 – 31 March 1969) was an Australian politician and a member of the New South Wales Legislative Assembly from 1949 until 1965. He was a member of the Labor Party and held numerous ministerial positions between 1953 and 1962.

== Early life ==
Wetherell was born in the gold rush town of Mount Egerton, Victoria and was the son of a miner. His father and an elder brother died in mining accidents by the time he was 14. He was educated to elementary level at catholic schools and initially worked in a gold battery at Ballarat. He arrived in Broken Hill in 1911 and worked as a miner until the Australian General Strike of 1917. He later worked as a journalist and editor on left wing newspapers.

== State Parliament ==
After an unsuccessful attempt to win the seat of Sturt as an independent at the 1922 state election, Wetherell became active within the Labor Party and was elected to the parliament as the member for Cobar at the 1949 by-election caused by the death of the sitting Labor member Mat Davidson. He retained the seat at the next 5 elections and retired at the 1965 election.

== Government ==
Wetherell was a member of the governments of Joseph Cahill, Robert Heffron and Jack Renshaw. He was appointed as Minister for Transport in 1953 and between 1956 and 1960 was the Minister for Conservation. Wetherell was responsible for the dismantling of the extensive Sydney Tramway network in favour of buses.

From 1960 until his retirement he was the Minister for Education. During his tenure he continued Bob Heffron's work on the education reforms known as the Wyndham Scheme were in the final stages of planning which culminated in the Public Education Act of 1961, which included an expansion of secondary education from 5 to 6 years and the replacement of the Leaving Certificate by the Higher School Certificate.

New South Wales Legislative Assembly
| Preceded by Mat Davidson | Member for Cobar; 1949 – 1965 | Succeeded by Lew Johnstone |
Political offices
| Preceded by Clarrie Martin | Minister for Transport; 1953 – 1956 | Succeeded by George Enticknap |
| Preceded by George Enticknap | Minister for Conservation; 1956 – 1960 | Succeeded by George Enticknap |
| Preceded by Robert Heffron | Minister for Education; 1960 – 1965 | Succeeded by Charles Cutler |
