= Frank Hawkins (politician) =

Australian politician

The Honourable Frank Hawkins

Secretary for Lands
- In office 3 April 1952 – 15 March 1956
- Premier: Joseph Cahill
- Preceded by: Jack Renshaw
- Succeeded by: Roger Nott

Personal details
- Born: 1 June 1897 Tenterfield, Colony of New South Wales
- Died: 20 December 1971 (aged 74) Newcastle, New South Wales, Australia
- Party: Labor

Francis Harold Hawkins (1 June 1897 – 20 December 1971) was an Australian politician. He was a member of the New South Wales Parliament from 1935 until 1968 and held a number of ministerial positions in the Government of New South Wales. He was a member of the Labor Party.

== Early life and career ==
Hawkins was born in Tenterfield and was educated to intermediate level at De La Salle College, Armidale. He worked initially with the Postmaster General's department and then the NSW Department of Railways. He was transferred to Newcastle Railway Station in 1933.

He died in Newcastle in 1971 at the age of 74, and was buried at Sandgate Cemetery following a service at Sacred Heart Cathedral, Hamilton.

== Political career ==
He successfully contested the Legislative Assembly seat of Newcastle as the Lang Labor candidate in the 1935 general election. The previous member, Peter Connolly did not contest the seat after losing his party's pre-selection.

Hawkins was minister without portfolio from 1950 to 1952, Minister for Lands from 1952 to 1956, and Minister for Child Welfare and for Social Services from 1956 to 1965.

New South Wales Legislative Assembly
Preceded by Peter Connolly	Member for Newcastle; 1935 – 1968	Succeeded by Arthur Wade
Political offices
Preceded by Jack Renshaw	Secretary for Lands; 1952 – 1956	Succeeded by Roger Nott
Preceded by Abe Landa as Minister for Social Welfare	Minister for Child Welfare; Minister for Social Welfare; 1956 – 1965	Succeeded by Arthur Bridges
