= Bill Sheahan (politician) =

Australian politician

The Honourable Bill Sheahan QC

37th Attorney General of New South Wales
- In office 23 February 1953 – 15 March 1956
- Premier: Joseph Cahill
- Preceded by: Clarrie Martin
- Succeeded by: Reg Downing

Personal details
- Born: 3 September 1895 Tumut, Colony of New South Wales
- Died: 27 December 1975 (aged 80) Sydney, New South Wales, Australia
- Party: Australian Labor Party (New South Wales Branch)
- Spouse: Ellen Imelda Byrne (m.1932)
- Education: University of Sydney (LL.B. 1930)

Military service
- Allegiance: Australia
- Branch/service: Australian Army
- Years of service: 1916–1919
- Rank: Private
- Unit: 17th Battalion; 5th Infantry Brigade Headquarters
- Battles/wars: First World War

William Francis Sheahan QC (3 September 1895 – 27 December 1975) also known as Bill Sheahan or Billy Sheahan, was an Australian politician, elected as a member of the New South Wales Legislative Assembly.

== Early life ==
Born in Tumut, New South Wales, the son of the publicans of the hotel at Jugiong, Sheahan attended schools in Tumut and St Patrick's College, Goulburn.

Sheahan gained work as a clerk in the Crown Law Department in 1914 before enlisting in the Australian Imperial Force in 1916, serving in France and Flanders. Following World War I, Sheahan returned to the Crown Law Department, working there until 1930, when he received a Bachelor of Laws at the University of Sydney and established a large criminal law practice. Called to the bar in 1930, Sheahan was made a Queen's Counsel in 1953.

== Political career ==
Elected as the Labor Party member for the New South Wales Electoral district of Yass in 1941, Sheahan served in parliament until 1973 (from 1950 as the member for Burrinjuck), holding the portfolios of Attorney-General of New South Wales, Minister for Transport and Minister for Health between 1950 and 1965. His son Terry Sheahan succeeded him as Member for Burrinjuck.

== Later life and legacy ==
Sheahan died in Sydney and was buried at Jugiong Cemetery.

In 1977, the 1,143 metres (3,750 ft) long "Sheahan Bridge", replaced the Prince Alfred Bridge near Gundagai as the Hume Highway crossing of the Murrumbidgee River. This bridge was duplicated in 2010.

New South Wales Legislative Assembly
Preceded by George Ardill	Member for Yass; 1941–1950	District abolished replaced by Burrinjuck
New district replacing Yass	Member for Burrinjuck; 1950–1973	Succeeded by Terry Sheahan
Political offices
Preceded by Bill Dunn	Secretary for Lands; 1947–1950	Succeeded by Jack Renshaw
Preceded by Maurice O'Sullivan	Minister for Transport; 1950–1953	Succeeded by Clarrie Martin
Preceded by Clarrie Martin	Attorney General of New South Wales; 1953–1956	Succeeded by Reg Downing
Preceded by Maurice O'Sullivan	Minister for Health; 1956–1965	Succeeded by Harry Jago
