= Jack Renshaw =

Australian politician (1909–1987)

The Honourable Jack Renshaw AC
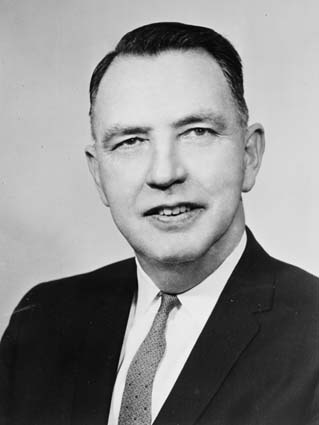

31st Premier of New South Wales
- In office 30 April 1964 – 13 May 1965
- Monarch: Elizabeth II
- Governor: Sir Eric Woodward
- Deputy: Pat Hills
- Preceded by: Bob Heffron
- Succeeded by: Robert Askin

Shire President of Coonabarabran
- In office 14 December 1939 – 15 May 1941
- Preceded by: William Thomas Neilson
- Succeeded by: S. H. Regan

Councillor of the Coonabarabran Shire Council for C Riding
- In office 4 December 1937 – 2 December 1944

Personal details
- Born: 8 August 1909 Wellington, New South Wales, Australia
- Died: 28 July 1987 (aged 77) Northbridge, New South Wales, Australia
- Party: Labor Party

John Brophy Renshaw (8 August 1909 – 28 July 1987) was an Australian politician. He was Labor Premier of New South Wales from 30 April 1964 to 13 May 1965. He was the first New South Wales Premier born in the 20th century.

== Early life ==
Jack Renshaw was born on 8 August 1909 near Wellington in central New South Wales. His parents were John Ignatius Renshaw and Ann Renshaw (née Reidy). When he was six his parents took up a selection near the town of Binnaway. Five years later his father died in a farm accident, leaving his widow to raise eight children. Following Ann Renshaw's remarriage the family prospered and came to own a fuel depot, stock and station agency and butchery in the town.

Renshaw was educated at Binnaway Central School, Patrician Brothers at Orange (where he lived with his grandmother), and then Holy Cross College at Ryde in north-western Sydney. After leaving school at the age of 14 he helped to run the family dairy property at Hampden Park, and also helped operate a milk run out of Binnaway.

Renshaw joined the Binnaway branch of the Australian Labor Party (ALP) in 1930, and soon held office in the branch. He also served on the state and federal electorate councils in the area, including as President of the Gwydir Electorate Council from 1939 to 1949. He was active in local government, serving as a councillor (C Riding) in the Coonabarabran Shire Council from 1937 to 1944. From 1939 to 1941 he was Shire President, becoming the youngest shire president in Australia at the time. He resigned as Shire President in May 1941 following his election to state Parliament. During the late 1930s he also held a position on the Northern Executive of the Wheat Growers' Union. In 1939 he volunteered for service in World War II but was rejected due to a defect in his eyesight.

== Political career ==
Renshaw was encouraged to run for state parliament in the local seat of Castlereagh by William Scully, the federal member for Gwydir, after Renshaw had worked as campaign director for him. He was supported by the Premier, William McKell, who realised that Renshaw's strong local identity and links to the farming community would help him in an election. Renshaw stood in the 1941 election, winning the seat from the Country Party member, Alfred Yeo, who had held Castlereagh for the previous nine years. From 1945 to 1950 Renshaw was a member of the central executive of the NSW ALP.

Renshaw was appointed Secretary for Lands in 1950 under Premier James McGirr. Relying upon his strong knowledge of agricultural and rural issues, he aggressively prosecuted the case for Labor's policy of compulsory resumption of large properties so that they could be subdivided. At the time it was believed the land was being under-utilised by land speculators and large agricultural companies and that closer settlement would promote the development of rural districts and solve post-war food shortages. The policy was opposed by the wealthier graziers, represented in part by the Country Party and the United Farmers' Association.

Impressed by his handling of the closer settlement debate, the new Premier Joe Cahill promoted Renshaw to Secretary for Public Works in 1952. He also became Minister for Local Government in 1953, later transferring from Public Works to Minister for Highways in 1956. Renshaw went on to serve as Deputy Premier from 1959 to 1964 (when Bob Heffron was Premier), and Treasurer from 1959 to 1965. He also served as Minister for Lands from 1960 to 1961, Minister for Agriculture from 1961 to 1962 and Minister for Industrial Development and Decentralisation from 1962 to 1965.

== Premier of New South Wales ==
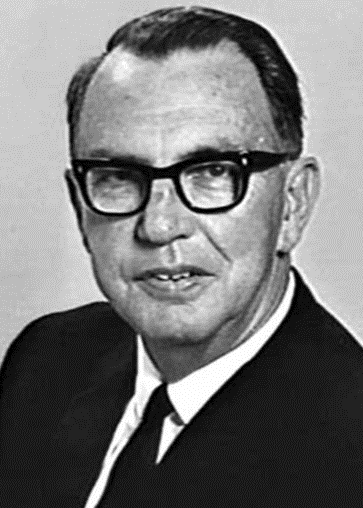
Renshaw as NSW Opposition Leader in January 1968.

When Heffron retired in April 1964, Renshaw became Premier. This tenure proved to be no more than a stopgap for a party increasingly seen as tired and unfocused after being in office since 1941. Of the 16 members in Renshaw's cabinet, six were aged 65 years or more, and most had been in cabinet during Labor's entire quarter-century run in government.

Renshaw waited as long as he could before calling an election for 1 May 1965. The Liberal leader, Bob Askin, often used the slogan "Twenty-four years of Labor misrule." Renshaw found it difficult to connect with urban voters, and his problems in adjusting to the new pressures of television only exacerbated his electoral failings. By contrast, Askin showed substantial skill with the TV medium.

At the election, Labor suffered a nine-seat swing against it. The Coalition garnered the support of two conservative independents, allowing Askin to become Premier. For the first time in 24 years, the ALP was out of office in New South Wales.

With his federal party colleagues having been in opposition since 1949, Renshaw is to date the last Labor Premier who did not encounter a Labor Prime Minister during his time in office.

Renshaw suffered a second and still more severe electoral defeat at the hands of Askin in 1968. He resigned soon after this election, and was succeeded by former Deputy Premier Pat Hills. Nevertheless, Renshaw remained an important figure both in the state parliament and in Labor's ruling circles; he served as Treasurer during the first four years (1976–80) of Neville Wran's administration. After that he was the state's Agent-General in London, holding that office till 1983.

== Personal life ==
On 12 November 1942 Renshaw married Hilda May Wall, at St Canice's Catholic Church, Elizabeth Bay; by her he had a son. Wall died in April 1964, just weeks before Renshaw was sworn in as Premier. His second wife, whom he married on 11 April 1966 at Holy Cross Catholic Church, Woollahra, was Marjorie (Meg) Mackay née Nolan (who had four children in total: one by Renshaw, three by a previous marriage). He died at the age of 77 in 1987 in the northern Sydney suburb of Northbridge.

In 2022, Catherine Renshaw, who is married to Jack Renshaw's son John, was the unsuccessful ALP candidate for the federal seat of North Sydney.

== Honours ==
- In the 1979 Australia Day Honours, Renshaw was named a Companion of the Order of Australia (AC).
- John Renshaw Drive, a section of road in the Hunter Valley, adjoining the Pacific Highway is named in Renshaw's honour.
- John Renshaw Parkway, a section of road in the Warrumbungle National Park, Joining Tooraweenah to Timor road, is named in Renshaw's honour.
- Jack Renshaw Bridge across the Castlereagh River at Gilgandra is named in his honour.

New South Wales Legislative Assembly
Preceded by Alfred Yeo	Member for Castlereagh; 1941 – 1980	Succeeded by Jim Curran
Political offices
Preceded by Bill Sheahan	Secretary for Lands; 1950 – 1952	Succeeded by John McGrath
Preceded by Joseph Cahill	Secretary for Public Works; 1952 – 1956	Succeeded by Frank Hawkins
Preceded by Joseph Cahill	Minister for Local Government; 1953 – 1959	Succeeded by Pat Hills
New title	Minister for Highways; 1956 – 1959	Succeeded by Pat Hills
Preceded by Bob Heffron	Deputy Premier of New South Wales; 1959 – 1964	Succeeded by Pat Hills
Preceded by Bob Heffron	Treasurer of New South Wales; 1959 – 1965	Succeeded by Robert Askin
Preceded by John McGrath	Minister for Lands; 1960 – 1961	Succeeded by Keith Compton
New title	Minister for Industrial Development and Decentralisation; 1962 – 1965	Succeeded by John Fuller as Minister for Decentralisation and Development
Preceded by Bob Heffron	Premier of New South Wales; 1964 – 1965	Succeeded by Robert Askin
Preceded by Sir Eric Willis	Treasurer of New South Wales; 1976 – 1980	Succeeded by Neville Wran
Party political offices
Preceded by Bob Heffron	Deputy Leader of the Australian Labor Party (NSW Branch); 1959 – 1964	Succeeded by Pat Hills
Preceded by Bob Heffron	Leader of the Australian Labor Party (NSW Branch); 1964 – 1968	Succeeded by Pat Hills
Diplomatic posts
Preceded by Peter Valkenburg	Agent-General for New South Wales; 1980 – 1983	Succeeded by Reginald Watson
