= McGirr ministry (1947–1950) =

Government of New South Wales, Australia

- 53rd Cabinet of the State of New South Wales

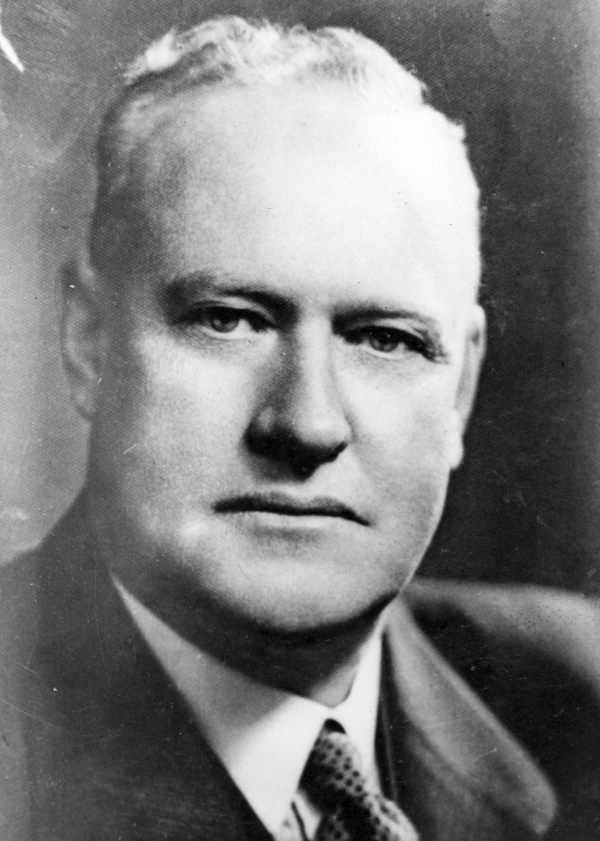
- Premier Jim McGirr
- Date formed: 19 May 1947
- Date dissolved: 30 June 1950

People and organisations
- Monarch: George VI
- Governor: Sir John Northcott
- Premier: Jim McGirr
- Deputy Premier: Jack Baddeley; Joe Cahill
- No. of ministers: 15
- Member party: Labor
- Status in legislature: Majority government
- Opposition party: UAP–Country Coalition
- Opposition leader: Vernon Treatt

History
- Election: 1947 New South Wales election
- Predecessor: First McGirr ministry
- Successor: Third McGirr ministry

The McGirr ministry (1947–1950) or Second McGirr ministry was the 53rd ministry of the New South Wales Government, and was led by the 28th Premier, Jim McGirr, of the Labor Party. The ministry was the second of three consecutive occasions when the Government was led by McGirr, as Premier.

McGirr was first elected to the New South Wales Legislative Assembly in 1922 and served continuously until 1952, holding the various seats of Cootamundra, Cumberland, Bankstown, and Liverpool. Having served in the third ministry of Jack Lang, and the first and second ministries of William McKell, McGirr was variously torn between Lang Labor and the newly formed Australian Labor Party. When McKell stood aside as Premier in 1947 in order to take up an appointment as Governor-General of Australia, McGirr was elected Labor Leader and became Premier. McGirr led Labor to victory at the 1947 state election.

This ministry covers the period from 19 May 1947 until the 1950 state election, held on 30 June, when McGirr led Labor to victory and the Third McGirr ministry was sworn in.

== Composition of ministry ==
The composition of the ministry was announced by Premier McGirr on 19 May 1947. The principal changes from the first McGirr ministry were that Bill Dunn was dropped, replaced by Bill Sheahan and the portfolio of Building Materials was created, filled by Claude Matthews. There was a rearrangement of the Ministry in September 1949, triggered by the resignation of Deputy Premier, Jack Baddeley. Baddeley suffered a heart attack in December 1948 while serving as Acting Premier. Joe Cahill succeeded Baddeley as Deputy Premier. The portfolio of Co-operative Societies was created and filled by Clarrie Martin.

Portfolio	Minister	Party	Term commence	Term end	Term of office
Premier; Treasurer	Jim McGirr (Note: Retained portfolios of from First McGirr ministry.)	Labor	19 May 1947	30 June 1950	3 years, 42 days
Deputy Premier	Jack Baddeley	Labor	19 May 1947	8 September 1949	2 years, 112 days
Deputy Premier	Joe Cahill	Labor	21 September 1949	30 June 1950	282 days
Chief Secretary	Jack Baddeley	Labor	19 May 1947	8 September 1949	2 years, 112 days
Chief Secretary	Jim McGirr	Labor	8 September 1949	21 September 1949	13 days
Chief Secretary	Claude Matthews	Labor	21 September 1949	30 June 1950	282 days
Secretary for Mines	Jack Baddeley	Labor	19 May 1947	8 September 1949	2 years, 112 days
Secretary for Mines	Jim McGirr	Labor	8 September 1949	21 September 1949	13 days
Secretary for Mines	William Dickson, MLC	Labor	21 September 1949	30 June 1950	282 days
Minister for National Emergency Services	Jack Baddeley	Labor	19 May 1947	8 September 1949	2 years, 112 days
Minister for National Emergency Services	Jim McGirr	Labor	8 September 1949	21 September 1949	13 days
Minister for Housing; Assistant Treasurer	Clive Evatt (Note: Retained portfolio of Housing from First McGirr ministry.)	Labor	19 May 1947	30 June 1950	3 years, 42 days
Minister for Education	Bob Heffron	Labor	19 May 1947	30 June 1950	3 years, 42 days
Attorney–General	Clarrie Martin, KC (Note: Retained portfolio of Attorney–General from First McGirr ministry.)	Labor	19 May 1947	30 June 1950	3 years, 42 days
Minister for Co-operative Societies	Clarrie Martin, KC	Labor	21 September 1949	30 June 1950	282 days
Minister for Labour and Industry and Social Welfare	Hamilton Knight	Labor	19 May 1947	29 October 1947	163 days
Minister for Labour and Industry and Social Welfare	Jack Baddeley	Labor	29 October 1947	9 March 1948	132 days
Minister for Labour and Industry and Social Welfare	Frank Finnan	Labor	9 March 1948	30 June 1950	2 years, 113 days
Minister of Justice; Vice-President of the Executive Council; Representative of the Government in the Legislative Council	Reg Downing, MLC	Labor	19 May 1947	30 June 1950	3 years, 42 days
Secretary for Public Works; Minister for Local Government	Joe Cahill	Labor	19 May 1947	30 June 1950	3 years, 42 days
Minister for Health	Gus Kelly	Labor	19 May 1947	30 June 1950	3 years, 42 days
Minister for Transport	Maurice O'Sullivan	Labor	19 May 1947	30 June 1950	3 years, 42 days
Minister for Agriculture	Eddie Graham	Labor	19 May 1947	30 June 1950	3 years, 42 days
Minister for Conservation	George Weir	Labor	19 May 1947	30 June 1950	3 years, 42 days
Secretary for Lands	Bill Sheahan	Labor	19 May 1947	30 June 1950	3 years, 42 days
Minister in Charge of Tourist Activities and Immigration	Frank Finnan	Labor	29 October 1947	9 March 1948	132 days
Minister in Charge of Tourist Activities and Immigration	Claude Matthews	Labor	9 March 1948	21 September 1949	1 year, 196 days
Minister in Charge of Tourist Activities and Immigration	Joshua Arthur	Labor	21 September 1949	30 June 1950	282 days
Minister without portfolio	Joshua Arthur	Labor	15 September 1949	21 September 1949	6 days
Minister for Building Materials	Claude Matthews	Labor	19 May 1947	9 March 1948	132 days
Minister for Building Materials	William Dickson, MLC	Labor	9 March 1948	30 June 1950	2 years, 113 days
Assistant Minister	William Dickson, MLC	Labor	19 May 1947	9 March 1948	132 days

Ministers are members of the Legislative Assembly unless otherwise noted.

== See also ==
- McGirr ministries
- First
- Third
- Members of the New South Wales Legislative Assembly
- 1947–1950
- Members of the New South Wales Legislative Council
- 1946–1949
- 1949–1952

New South Wales government ministries
Preceded by McGirr ministry (1947)	McGirr ministry (1947–1950); 1947–1950	Succeeded by McGirr ministry (1950–1952)
