= McGirr ministry (1947) =

- 52nd Cabinet of the State of New South Wales

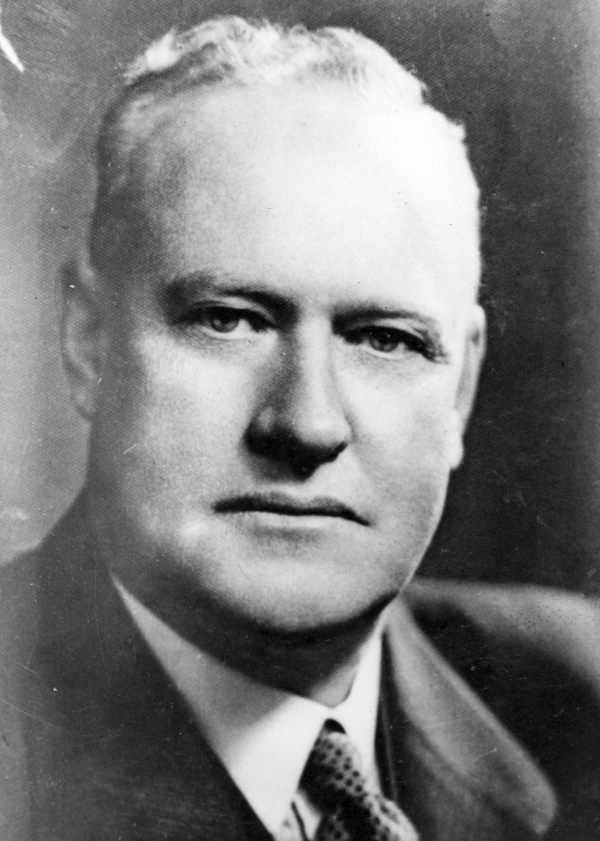
- Premier Jim McGirr
- Date formed: 6 February 1947
- Date dissolved: 19 May 1947

People and organisations
- Monarch: George VI
- Governor: Sir John Northcott
- Premier: Jim McGirr
- Deputy Premier: Jack Baddeley
- No. of ministers: 15
- Member party: Labor
- Status in legislature: Majority government
- Opposition party: UAP–Country Coalition
- Opposition leader: Vernon Treatt

History
- Election: 1944 New South Wales election
- Predecessor: Second McKell ministry
- Successor: Second McGirr ministry

The McGirr ministry (1947) or First McGirr ministry was the 52nd ministry of the New South Wales Government, and was led by the 28th Premier, Jim McGirr, of the Labor Party. The ministry was the first of three occasions when the Government was led by McGirr, as Premier.

McGirr was first elected to the New South Wales Legislative Assembly in 1922 and served continuously until 1952, holding the various seats of Cootamundra, Cumberland, Bankstown, and Liverpool. McGirr was a staunch supporter of Jack Lang and served in the third Lang ministry, he was the only Langite to be appointed to William McKell's first ministry, retaining his portfolio in the second McKell ministry. When McKell stood aside as Premier in 1947 in order to take up an appointment as Governor-General of Australia, there was a bitter struggle for the Labor Leadership between McGirr and Bob Heffron, with McGirr eventually winning by just two votes.

This ministry covers just 102 days, from 6 February 1947 until the 1947 state election, held on 19 May, when McGirr led Labor to victory and the Second McGirr ministry was sworn in.

== Composition of ministry ==
The composition of the ministry was announced by Premier McGirr on 6 February 1947 and covers until 19 May 1947 when the 1947 state election was held. There were minimal changes from the second McKell ministry, with Clive Evatt replacing McGirr as Minister for Housing and Frank Finnan replacing Evatt.

Portfolio	Minister	Party	Term commence	Term end	Term of office
Premier; Treasurer	Jim McGirr	Labor	6 February 1947	19 May 1947	102 days
Minister for Agriculture	Jim McGirr	Labor	6 February 1947	13 February 1947	7 days
Minister for Agriculture	Eddie Graham	Labor	13 February 1947	19 May 1947	95 days
Chief Secretary; Secretary for Mines	Jack Baddeley (Note: Retained portfolios of from Second McKell ministry.)	Labor	6 February 1947	19 May 1947	102 days
Deputy Premier; Minister for National Emergency Services	Jack Baddeley	Labor	25 February 1947	19 May 1947	83 days
Minister for Housing	Clive Evatt	Labor	6 February 1947	19 May 1947	102 days
Minister for Education	Bob Heffron	Labor	6 February 1947	19 May 1947	102 days
Attorney–General	Clarrie Martin, KC	Labor	6 February 1947	19 May 1947	102 days
Secretary for Lands	Bill Dunn	Labor	6 February 1947	19 May 1947	102 days
Minister for Labour and Industry and Social Services	Hamilton Knight	Labor	6 February 1947	19 May 1947	102 days
Minister of Justice; Vice-President of the Executive Council; Representative of the Government in the Legislative Council	Reg Downing, MLC	Labor	6 February 1947	19 May 1947	102 days
Secretary for Public Works; Minister for Local Government	Joseph Cahill	Labor	6 February 1947	19 May 1947	102 days
Minister for Health	Gus Kelly	Labor	6 February 1947	19 May 1947	102 days
Minister for Transport	Maurice O'Sullivan	Labor	6 February 1947	19 May 1947	102 days
Minister for Conservation	George Weir	Labor	6 February 1947	19 May 1947	102 days
Minister in Charge of Tourist Activities and Immigration	Frank Finnan	Labor	6 February 1947	19 May 1947	102 days
Assistant Minister	William Dickson, MLC	Labor	6 February 1947	19 May 1947	102 days

Ministers are members of the Legislative Assembly unless otherwise noted.

== See also ==
- McGirr ministries
- Second
- Third
- Members of the New South Wales Legislative Assembly
- 1944–1947
- Members of the New South Wales Legislative Council
- 1946–1949

New South Wales government ministries
Preceded by McKell ministry (1944–1947)	McGirr ministry (1947); 1947	Succeeded by McGirr ministry (1947–1950)
