= McGirr ministry (1950–1952) =

- 54th Cabinet of the State of New South Wales

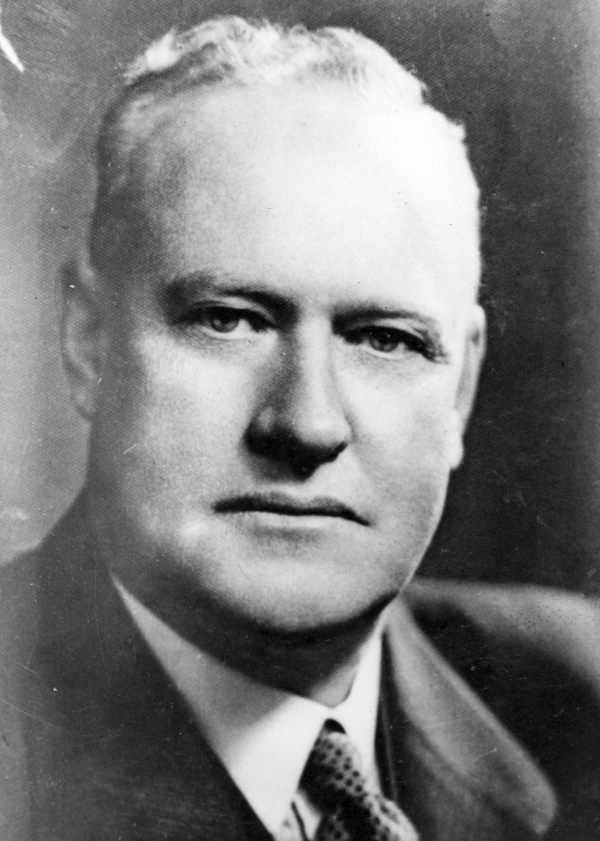
- Premier Jim McGirr
- Date formed: 30 June 1950
- Date dissolved: 2 April 1952

People and organisations
- Monarch: George VI; Elizabeth II
- Governor: Sir John Northcott
- Premier: Jim McGirr
- Deputy Premier: Joe Cahill
- No. of ministers: 15
- Member party: Labor
- Status in legislature: Minority government
- Opposition party: Liberal–Country Coalition
- Opposition leader: Vernon Treatt

History
- Election: 1950 New South Wales election
- Predecessor: Second McGirr ministry
- Successor: First Cahill ministry

The McGirr ministry (1950–1952) or Third McGirr ministry was the 54th ministry of the New South Wales Government, and was led by the 28th Premier, Jim McGirr, of the Labor Party. The ministry was the third and final of three consecutive occasions when the government was led by McGirr, as Premier.

McGirr was first elected to the New South Wales Legislative Assembly in 1922 and served continuously until 1952, holding the various seats of Cootamundra, Cumberland, Bankstown, and Liverpool. Having served in the third ministry of Jack Lang, and the first and second ministries of William McKell, McGirr was variously torn between Lang Labor and the newly formed Australian Labor Party. When McKell stood aside as Premier in 1947 in order to take up an appointment as Governor-General of Australia, McGirr was elected Labor Leader and became Premier. McGirr led Labor to victory at the 1947 state election. Labor lost its majority at the 1950 state election and had to rely upon the support of two independent members, James Geraghty and John Seiffert, who had been expelled from Labor as a result of voting against the party ticket in the 1949 election for the Legislative Council. Seiffert was subsequently re-admitted to the Labor party

This ministry covers the period from 30 May 1950 until 2 April 1952 when McGirr resigned as Premier in favour of his deputy Joe Cahill.

== Composition of ministry ==
The composition of the ministry was announced by Premier McGirr following the election held on 30 May 1950, and covers the period up until 2 April 1952.

| Portfolio | Minister | Party | Term commence | Term end | Term of office |
|---|---|---|---|---|---|
| Premier; Treasurer | Jim McGirr (Note: Retained portfolios of from second McGirr ministry.) | Labor | 30 June 1950 | 2 April 1952 | 1 year, 277 days |
| Deputy Premier; Secretary for Public Works; Minister for Local Government | Joe Cahill | Labor | 30 June 1950 | 2 April 1952 | 1 year, 277 days |
| Chief Secretary; Assistant Treasurer; Minister for Co-operative Societies | Clive Evatt (Note: Retained portfolio of Assistant Treasurer from second McGirr ministry.) | Labor | 30 June 1950 | 2 April 1952 | 1 year, 277 days |
| Minister for Education | Bob Heffron | Labor | 30 June 1950 | 2 April 1952 | 1 year, 277 days |
| Attorney–General | Clarrie Martin, KC | Labor | 30 June 1950 | 2 April 1952 | 1 year, 277 days |
| Minister for Justice; Vice-President of the Executive Council; Representative of the Government in the Legislative Council | Reg Downing, MLC | Labor | 30 June 1950 | 2 April 1952 | 1 year, 277 days |
| Minister for Housing | Gus Kelly | Labor | 30 June 1950 | 2 April 1952 | 1 year, 277 days |
| Minister for Health | Maurice O'Sullivan | Labor | 30 June 1950 | 2 April 1952 | 1 year, 277 days |
| Minister for Secondary Industries; Minister for Building Materials | William Dickson, MLC | Labor | 30 June 1950 | 2 April 1952 | 1 year, 277 days |
| Minister for Agriculture | Eddie Graham | Labor | 30 June 1950 | 2 April 1952 | 1 year, 277 days |
| Minister for Conservation | George Weir | Labor | 30 June 1950 | 2 April 1952 | 1 year, 277 days |
| Minister for Labour and Industry; Minister for Social Welfare | Frank Finnan | Labor | 30 June 1950 | 2 April 1952 | 1 year, 277 days |
| Minister for Transport | Bill Sheahan | Labor | 30 June 1950 | 2 April 1952 | 1 year, 277 days |
| Secretary for Mines; Minister for Immigration | Joshua Arthur | Labor | 30 June 1950 | 2 April 1952 | 1 year, 277 days |
| Secretary for Lands | Jack Renshaw | Labor | 30 June 1950 | 2 April 1952 | 1 year, 277 days |
| Minister without portfolio | Frank Hawkins | Labor | 30 June 1950 | 2 April 1952 | 1 year, 277 days |

Ministers are members of the Legislative Assembly unless otherwise noted.

== See also ==
- McGirr ministries
- First
- Second
- Members of the New South Wales Legislative Assembly
- 1950–1953
- Members of the New South Wales Legislative Council
- 1949–1952

New South Wales government ministries
| Preceded by McGirr ministry (1947–1950) | McGirr ministry (1950–1952); 1950–1952 | Succeeded by Cahill ministry (1952–1953) |
