= McKell ministry (1944–1947) =

- 50th Cabinet of the State of New South Wales

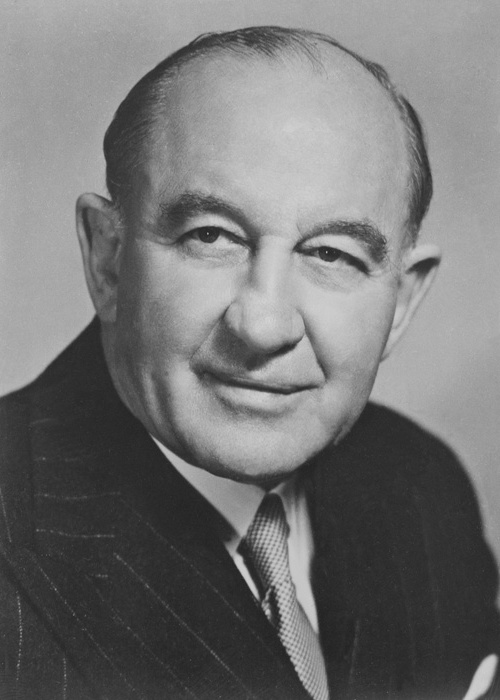
- Premier William McKell
- Date formed: 8 June 1944
- Date dissolved: 6 February 1947

People and organisations
- Monarch: George VI
- Governor: The Lord Wakehurst / Sir John Northcott
- Premier: William McKell
- Deputy Premier: Jack Baddeley
- No. of ministers: 15
- Member party: Labor
- Status in legislature: Majority government
- Opposition party: UAP–Country Coalition
- Opposition leader: Reginald Weaver / Alexander Mair / Vernon Treatt

History
- Election: 1944 New South Wales election
- Predecessor: First McKell ministry
- Successor: First McGirr ministry

The McKell ministry (1944–1947) or Second McKell ministry was the 51st ministry of the New South Wales Government, and was led by the 27th Premier, William McKell, of the Labor Party. The ministry was the second of two occasions when the Government was led by McKell, as Premier.

McKell was first elected to the New South Wales Legislative Assembly in 1917 and served continuously until 1947, when he resigned to become the 12th Governor-General of Australia. Having served as a junior minister in the first and third ministries of Jack Lang, during the 1930s McKell came to oppose Lang's dictatorial rule and critical of electoral failures. In 1939 McKell displaced Lang as Labor leader and NSW Leader of the Opposition. McKell led Labor to victory at the 1941 state election, defeating the UAP–Country Coalition of Alexander Mair and Michael Bruxner. McKell and his government were re-elected for a subsequent term at the 1944 state election.

This ministry covers the period from 8 June 1944 until 6 February 1947 when McKell resigned to become Governor-General of Australia. McKell was succeeded by Jim McGirr.

== Composition of ministry ==
The composition of the ministry was announced by Premier McKell on 8 June 1944. There was a minor reshuffle in May 1946 following the appointment of Jack Tully as Agent-General for New South Wales in London.

Portfolio	Minister	Party	Term commence	Term end	Term of office
Premier; Treasurer	William McKell (Note: Retained portfolios from First McKell ministry.)	Labor	8 June 1944	6 February 1947	2 years, 243 days
Deputy Premier; Chief Secretary; Secretary for Mines; Minister for National Emergency Services	Jack Baddeley (Note: Retained portfolios of Deputy Premier, Chief Secretary and Secretary for Mines from First McKell ministry.)	Labor	8 June 1944	6 February 1947	2 years, 243 days
Minister for Education	Bob Heffron	Labor	8 June 1944	6 February 1947	2 years, 243 days
Attorney–General	Clarrie Martin, KC	Labor	8 June 1944	6 February 1947	2 years, 243 days
Minister for Conservation	Bill Dunn	Labor	8 June 1944	9 May 1946	1 year, 335 days
Minister for Conservation	George Weir	Labor	9 May 1946	6 February 1947	273 days
Minister for Labour and Industry and Social Services	Hamilton Knight	Labor	8 June 1944	6 February 1947	2 years, 243 days
Minister of Justice; Vice-President of the Executive Council; Representative of the Government in the Legislative Council	Reg Downing, MLC	Labor	8 June 1944	6 February 1947	2 years, 243 days
Secretary for Public Works; Minister for Local Government	Joseph Cahill (Note: Retained portfolio of Secretary for Public Works from first McKell ministry)	Labor	8 June 1944	6 February 1947	2 years, 243 days
Minister for Health	Gus Kelly	Labor	8 June 1944	6 February 1947	2 years, 243 days
Minister for Housing	Jim McGirr	Labor	8 June 1944	6 February 1947	2 years, 243 days
Secretary for Lands	Jack Tully (Note: Resigned to accept appointment as Agent-General for New South Wales in London.)	Labor	8 June 1944	9 May 1946	1 year, 335 days
Secretary for Lands	Bill Dunn	Labor	9 May 1946	6 February 1947	273 days
Minister for Transport	Maurice O'Sullivan	Labor	8 June 1944	6 February 1947	2 years, 243 days
Minister for Agriculture	Eddie Graham	Labor	8 June 1944	6 February 1947	2 years, 243 days
Minister in Charge of Tourist Activities and Immigration	Clive Evatt	Labor	9 May 1946	6 February 1947	273 days
Assistant Minister	Clive Evatt	Labor	8 June 1944	9 May 1946	1 year, 335 days
Assistant Minister	William Dickson, MLC	Labor	8 June 1944	6 February 1947	2 years, 243 days
Assistant Minister	George Weir	Labor	25 February 1946	9 May 1946	73 days

Ministers are members of the Legislative Assembly unless otherwise noted.

== See also ==
- First McKell ministry
- Members of the New South Wales Legislative Assembly, 1944-1947
- Members of the New South Wales Legislative Council, 1943-1946
- Members of the New South Wales Legislative Council, 1946-1949

New South Wales government ministries
Preceded by McKell ministry (1941–1944)	McKell ministry (1944–1947); 1944–1947	Succeeded by McGirr ministry (1947)
