= Minister for Families and Communities =

Government minister in New South Wales, Australia

- Incumbent; Kate Washington since 5 April 2023
- Department of Communities and Justice
- Style: The Honourable
- Appointer: Governor of New South Wales
- Inaugural holder: Herbert Hawkins (as Minister for Social Services)
- Formation: 22 August 1935

The New South Wales Minister for Families and Communities is a minister of the Government of New South Wales with responsibility for social policy and welfare, including matters relating to ageing, disability, multiculturalism, and veterans' affairs, women's affairs and youth in the state of New South Wales, Australia. The portfolio is currently held by Kate Washington, who also holds the position of Minister for Disability Inclusion.

The Minister is assisted in the administration of her portfolio by the following ministers:

- Minister for Housing, Homelessness and Youth, currently Rose Jackson
- Minister for Seniors, Women and Prevention of Domestic Violence and Sexual Assault , currently Jodie Harrison
- Minister for Veterans, currently David Harris

Collectively the ministers administer the portfolio through the Stronger Communities cluster, in particular through the Department of Communities and Justice and a range of other government agencies.

== List of ministers ==
Ministerial title	Minister	Party	Ministry	Term start	Term end	Time in office	Notes
Minister for Social Services	Herbert Hawkins	United Australia	Stevens (2)	22 August 1935	13 October 1938	3 years, 52 days	
Minister for Social Services	Athol Richardson	United Australia	Stevens (3)	13 October 1938	5 August 1939	307 days	
Minister for Labour and Industry and Social Services	Athol Richardson	United Australia	Stevens (3)	5 August 1939	16 August 1939	307 days	
Minister for Labour and Industry and Social Services	George Gollan	United Australia	Mair	16 August 1939	16 May 1941	1 year, 273 days	
Minister for Labour and Industry and Social Services	Hamilton Knight	Labor	McKell (1) (2)	16 May 1941	6 February 1947	6 years, 166 days	
Minister for Labour and Industry and Social Welfare	Hamilton Knight	Labor	McGirr (1) (2)	6 February 1947	29 October 1947	6 years, 166 days	
Minister for Labour and Industry and Social Welfare	Jack Baddeley	Labor	McGirr (2)	29 October 1947	9 March 1948	132 days	
Minister for Labour and Industry and Social Welfare	Frank Finnan	Labor	McGirr (2)	9 March 1948	30 June 1950	4 years, 351 days	
Minister for Social Welfare	Frank Finnan	Labor	McGirr (3); Cahill (1)	30 June 1950	23 February 1953	4 years, 351 days	
Minister for Social Welfare	Abe Landa	Labor	Cahill (2)	23 February 1953	15 March 1956	3 years, 21 days	
Minister for Social Welfare; Minister for Child Welfare	Frank Hawkins	Labor	Cahill (3) (4); Heffron (1) (2); Renshaw	15 March 1956	13 May 1965	9 years, 59 days	
Minister for Social Welfare; Minister for Child Welfare	Arthur Bridges	Liberal	Askin (1) (2)	13 May 1965	22 May 1968	3 years, 9 days	
Minister for Social Welfare; Minister for Child Welfare	Harry Jago	Liberal	Askin (2)	23 May 1968	3 September 1968	104 days	
Minister for Social Welfare; Minister for Child Welfare	Frederick Hewitt	Liberal	Askin (2) (3)	3 September 1968	11 March 1971	2 years, 189 days	
Minister for Social Welfare; Minister for Child Welfare	John Waddy	Liberal	Askin (4)	11 March 1971	17 January 1973	2 years, 267 days	
Minister for Youth and Community Services	John Waddy	Liberal	Askin (5)	17 January 1973	3 December 1973	2 years, 267 days	
Minister for Youth and Community Services	Dick Healey	Liberal	Askin (6)	3 December 1973	3 January 1975	1 year, 31 days	
Minister for Youth, Ethnic and Community Affairs	Steve Mauger	Liberal	Lewis (1) (2)	3 January 1975	23 January 1976	1 year, 20 days	
Minister for Youth, Ethnic and Community Affairs	Jim Clough	Liberal	Willis	23 January 1976	14 May 1976	112 days	
Minister for Youth and Community Services	Rex Jackson	Labor	Wran (1) (2) (3)	14 May 1976	2 October 1981	5 years, 141 days	
Minister for Youth and Community Services	Kevin Stewart	Labor	Wran (4)	2 October 1981	1 February 1983	1 year, 122 days	
Minister for Youth and Community Services	Frank Walker	Labor	Wran (5) (6) (7)	1 February 1983	6 February 1986	3 years, 5 days	
Minister for Youth and Community Services	Peter Anderson	Labor	Wran (8)	6 February 1986	4 July 1986	148 days	
Minister for Youth and Community Services	John Aquilina	Labor	Unsworth	4 July 1986	25 March 1988	1 year, 265 days	
Minister for Family and Community Services	Virginia Chadwick	Liberal	Greiner (1)	25 March 1988	24 July 1990	2 years, 121 days	
Minister for Family and Community Services	Robert Webster	National	Greiner (1)	24 July 1990	6 June 1991	317 days	
Minister for Health and Community Services	John Hannaford	Liberal	Greiner (2)	6 June 1991	24 June 1992	1 year, 18 days	
Minister for Community Services	Jim Longley	Liberal	Fahey (1) (2) (3)	24 June 1992	4 April 1995	2 years, 284 days	
Minister for Community Services	Ron Dyer	Labor	Carr (1)	4 April 1995	1 December 1997	2 years, 241 days	
Minister for Community Services	Faye Lo Po'	Labor	Carr (2) (3)	1 December 1997	2 April 2003	5 years, 122 days	
Minister for Community Services	Carmel Tebbutt	Labor	Carr (4)	2 April 2003	21 January 2005	1 year, 294 days	
Minister for Community Services	Reba Meagher	Labor	Iemma (1)	21 January 2005	2 April 2007	2 years, 71 days	
Minister for Community Services	Kevin Greene	Labor	Iemma (2)	2 April 2007	8 September 2008	1 year, 159 days	
Minister for Community Services	Linda Burney	Labor	Rees; Keneally	8 September 2008	28 March 2011	2 years, 207 days	
Minister for Family and Community Services	Pru Goward	Liberal	O'Farrell	3 April 2011	23 April 2014	3 years, 20 days	
Minister for Family and Community Services	Gabrielle Upton	Liberal	Baird (1)	23 April 2014	2 April 2015	344 days	
Minister for Family and Community Services	Brad Hazzard	Liberal	Baird (2)	2 April 2015	30 January 2017	1 year, 303 days	
Minister for Family and Community Services	Pru Goward	Liberal	Berejiklian (1)	30 January 2017	26 March 2019	2 years, 55 days	
Minister for Families, Communities and Disability Services	Gareth Ward	Liberal	Berejiklian (2)	2 April 2019	14 May 2021	2 years, 42 days	
Minister for Families, Communities and Disability Services	Alister Henskens	Liberal	Berejiklian (2); Perrottet (1)	27 May 2021	21 December 2021	208 days	
Minister for Families and Communities	Natasha Maclaren-Jones	Liberal	Perrottet (2)	21 December 2021	5 April 2023	4 years, 332 days	
Minister for Families and Communities	Kate Washington	Labor	Minns	5 April 2023	incumbent	3 years, 227 days	

== Former ministerial title ==
=== Social housing ===
Ministerial title	Minister	Party	Ministry	Term start	Term end	Time in office	Notes
Minister for Social Housing	Brad Hazzard	Liberal	Baird (2)	2 April 2015	30 January 2017	1 year, 303 days	
Minister for Social Housing	Pru Goward	Liberal	Berejiklian (1)	30 January 2017	23 March 2019	2 years, 52 days	

=== Volunteering ===
The Minister for Volunteering is a minister in the New South Wales Government with responsibility for volunteering in New South Wales. It was first established in 2007 in the Second Iemma ministry and was abolished in 2011 following the defeat of the Keneally ministry.

Title	Minister	Party	Ministry	Term start	Term end	Time in office	Notes
Minister for Volunteering	Linda Burney	Labor	Iemma (2)	2 April 2007	5 September 2008	1 year, 156 days	
Minister for Volunteering	Graham West	Labor	Rees	8 September 2008	4 December 2009	1 year, 87 days	
Minister for Volunteering	Peter Primrose	Labor	Keneally	4 December 2009	28 March 2011	1 year, 114 days	

== See also ==
- List of New South Wales government agencies
