= McKell ministry (1941–1944) =

50th ministry of NSW, Australia

- 50th Cabinet of the State of New South Wales

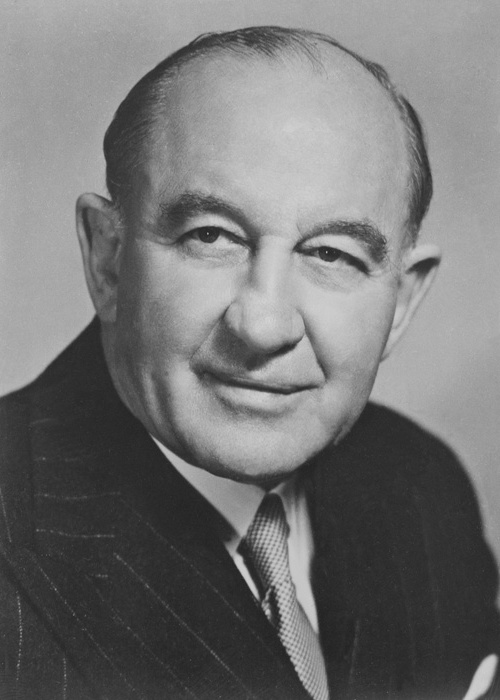
- Premier William McKell
- Date formed: 16 May 1941
- Date dissolved: 8 June 1944

People and organisations
- Monarch: George VI
- Governor: The Lord Wakehurst
- Premier: William McKell
- Deputy Premier: Jack Baddeley
- No. of ministers: 15
- Member party: Labor
- Status in legislature: Majority government
- Opposition party: UAP–Country Coalition
- Opposition leader: Alexander Mair / Reginald Weaver

History
- Election: 1941 New South Wales election
- Predecessor: Mair–Bruxner ministry
- Successor: Second McKell ministry

The McKell ministry (1941–1944) or First McKell ministry was the 50th ministry of the New South Wales Government, and was led by the 27th Premier, William McKell, of the Labor Party. The ministry was the first of two occasions when the Government was led by McKell, as Premier.

McKell was first elected to the New South Wales Legislative Assembly in 1917 and served continuously until 1947, when he resigned to become the 12th Governor-General of Australia. Having served as a junior minister in the first and third ministries of Jack Lang, during the 1930s McKell came to oppose Lang's dictatorial rule and critical of electoral failures. In 1939 McKell displaced Lang as Labor leader and NSW Leader of the Opposition.

McKell led Labor to victory at the 1941 state election, defeating the UAP–Country Coalition of Alexander Mair and Michael Bruxner.

This ministry covers the period from 16 May 1941 until 8 June 1944, when the 1944 state election saw McKell re-elected for a subsequent term.

== Composition of ministry ==
The composition of the ministry was announced by Premier McKell on 16 May 1941 and covers the full term of government, until 8 June 1944.

Portfolio	Minister	Party	Term commence	Term end	Term of office
Premier; Treasurer	William McKell	Labor	16 May 1941	8 June 1944	3 years, 23 days
Deputy Premier; Chief Secretary; Secretary for Mines	Jack Baddeley	Labor	16 May 1941	8 June 1944	3 years, 23 days
Minister for National Emergency Services	Bob Heffron	Labor	16 May 1941	8 June 1944	3 years, 23 days
Attorney–General	Clarrie Martin, KC	Labor	16 May 1941	8 June 1944	3 years, 23 days
Minister for Agriculture and Forests	Bill Dunn	Labor	16 May 1941	8 June 1944	3 years, 23 days
Minister for Education	Clive Evatt	Labor	16 May 1941	8 June 1944	3 years, 23 days
Minister for Labour and Industry and Social Services	Hamilton Knight	Labor	16 May 1941	8 June 1944	3 years, 23 days
Minister of Justice; Vice-President of the Executive Council; Representative of the Government in the Legislative Council	Reg Downing, MLC	Labor	16 May 1941	8 June 1944	3 years, 23 days
Secretary for Public Works	Joseph Cahill	Labor	16 May 1941	8 June 1944	3 years, 23 days
Minister for Health	Gus Kelly	Labor	16 May 1941	8 June 1944	3 years, 23 days
Minister for Local Government and Housing	Jim McGirr	Labor	16 May 1941	8 June 1944	3 years, 23 days
Secretary for Lands	Jack Tully	Labor	16 May 1941	8 June 1944	3 years, 23 days
Minister for Transport	Maurice O'Sullivan	Labor	16 May 1941	8 June 1944	3 years, 23 days
Assistant Minister	Carlo Lazzarini	Labor	16 May 1941	8 June 1944	3 years, 23 days
Assistant Minister	William Dickson, MLC	Labor	16 May 1941	8 June 1944	3 years, 23 days

== See also ==
- William McKell – 27th Premier of New South Wales
- Second McKell ministry
- Members of the New South Wales Legislative Assembly, 1941-1944
- Members of the New South Wales Legislative Council, 1940–1943
- Members of the New South Wales Legislative Council, 1943–1946

New South Wales government ministries
Preceded by Mair–Bruxner ministry	McKell ministry (1941–1944); 1941–1944	Succeeded by McKell ministry (1944–1947)
