= Minister for Emergency Services (New South Wales) =

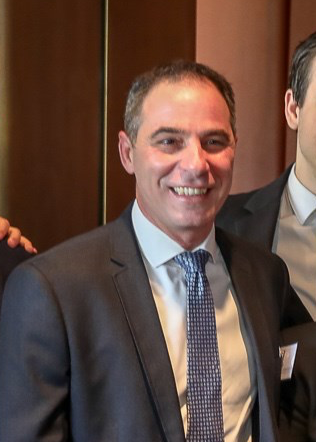
- Incumbent; Jihad Dib since 5 April 2023
- Premier's Department; Department of Communities and Justice
- Style: The Honourable
- Appointer: Governor of New South Wales
- Inaugural holder: Michael Bruxner (as Minister in Charge of National Emergency Services)
- Formation: 1 February 1939

The New South Wales Minister for Emergency Services is a minister within the Government of New South Wales who has the oversight of the emergency service agencies. The portfolio is administered through the Premier's Department, the Department of Communities and Justice and agencies such as Fire and Rescue, Rural Fire Service (RFS) and State Emergency Service (SES).

== Agencies ==
The following agencies are responsible to the Minister for Emergency Services and Resilience:

- Fire and Rescue
- Rural Fire Service (RFS)
- State Emergency Service (SES)

== History ==
The National Emergency Services Agency commenced operation on 1 February 1939. The agency was formed in response to a request from the Prime Minister that the Australian states devise a scheme for the protection of the civilian population against possible attacks from the air in the event of a national attack. The first minister Michael Bruxner stated that the objective of the organisation was not just air raids, but to deal with any major catastrophe, such as fires or floods, including the co-ordination of existing organisations such as the Ambulance, the Fire Brigades, the Red Cross, and the Police Department. The portfolio was abolished after the war.

=== Minister for National Emergency Services ===
Minister for National Emergency Services of New South Wales

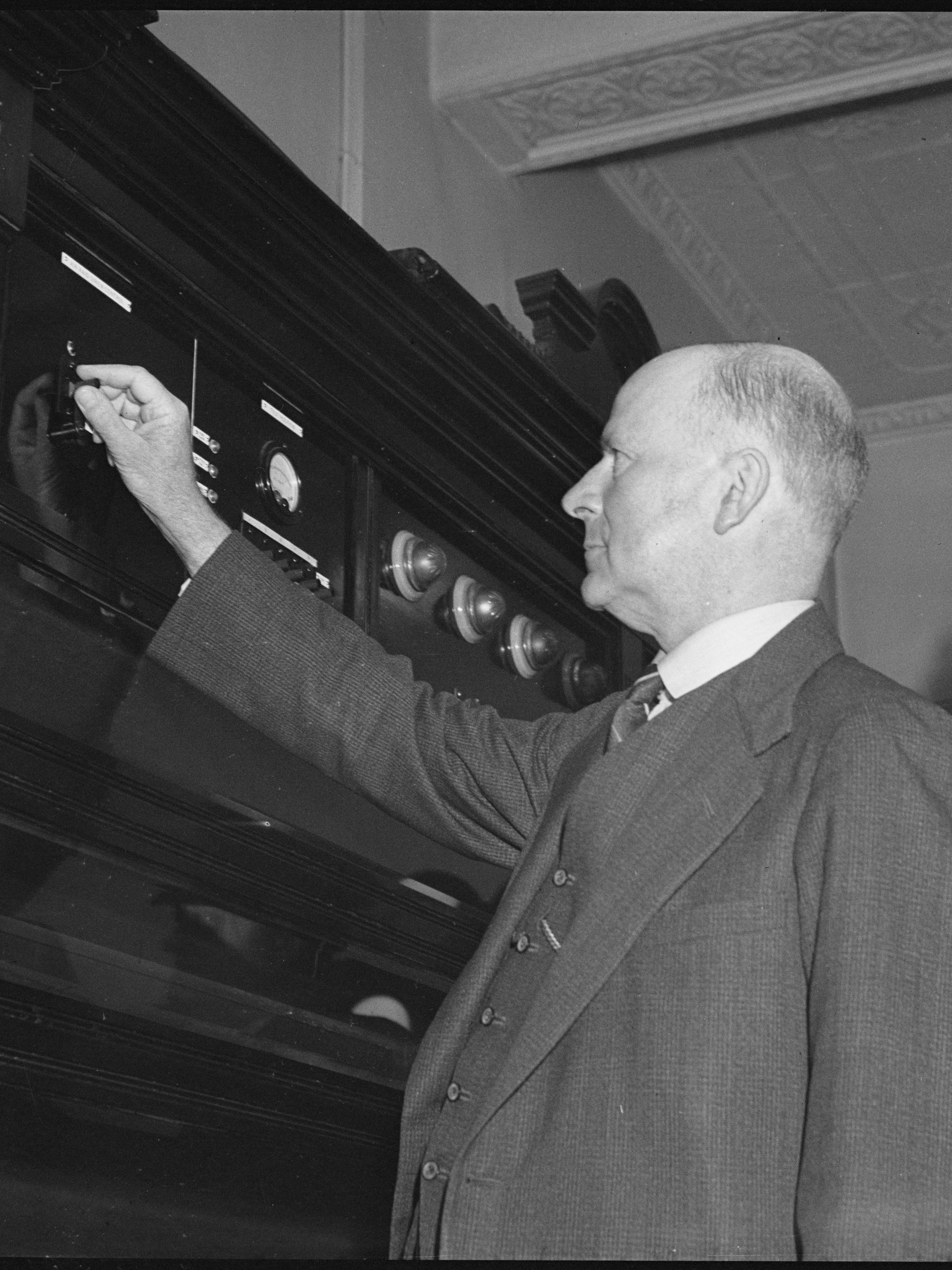
- Minister Michael Bruxner testing air raid sirens
- Appointer: Governor of New South Wales
- Formation: 1 February 1939
- First holder: Michael Bruxner
- Final holder: Jim McGirr
- Abolished: 21 September 1949

The Minister for National Emergency Services had two principal activities: a) the provision of measures for the protection of the life and property of the people, such as provision of air raid warnings, lighting control, air raid shelters, protection of vital plant and numerous other schemes to meet emergency conditions; and b) operational activities, including the organisation of personnel trained in specialist duties to cope with the immediate effects of enemy attack. While the agency was created in 1939 and Michael Bruxner, the Deputy Premier and Minister for Transport, was the first responsible minister, it was not created as a formal portfolio until the first McKell ministry in 1941. Bruxner had been a member of the Australian Imperial Force in World War I and had finished that war promoted to lieutenant colonel.

The first task of the department was to prepare a scheme of organisation for the State. The scheme provided for the formation of a Civil Defence Organisation upon a municipal or shire basis. Each municipality or shire became an "Area". A Chief Warden was appointed, to take charge of each Area. The Chief Warden and all of the area staff served in a voluntary capacity.

The headquarters’ staff, under a director, who was responsible to the minister, were public sector employees. In addition to a secretary and clerical staff, officers included a controller of training, a supervisor of first aid training, liaison officers and an executive officer of the technical committee, who was an officer of the professional staff of the Department of Public Works. Arrangements were made for the establishment of a special control staff at headquarters to assist in the event of an attack. In order that the best technical advice should be available, committees directly responsible to the Director were appointed. The personnel of these committees were also volunteers.

The National Emergency Act 1941 received assent on 20 March 1941, and remained in force for the duration of hostilities with Germany and for a period of six months thereafter. The Act provided for preparing and implementing Raid Precautions Schemes and Regulations. The first Raid Precautions Scheme was gazetted on 6 June 1941, and the first Regulations on 13 June 1941. The legislation was amended in October 1941, to bring navigable waters under the scope of the Act.

=== Emergency Services ===
It was recreated in 1982 in the fourth Wran ministry, combined with the portfolio of Police. The emergency services included New South Wales Fire Brigades, Department of Bush Fire Services and the State Emergency Service. While the Ambulance Service is an emergency service, it has not been part of the responsibilities of this portfolio, instead being the responsibility of the Minister for Health. The portfolio has frequently been held in conjunction with the portfolios of either Police or Corrective Services.

Between 1 May 2020 and 16 December 2022, the minister had the oversight of Resilience NSW, with a focus on disaster management. In March 2022 the New South Wales Premier appointed Steph Cooke MP as the Minister for Flood Recovery.

== List of ministers ==
=== Emergency Services ===
The following individuals have served as Minister for Emergency Services, or any precedent titles:

Title	Minister	Party	Ministry	Term start	Term end	Time in office	Notes
Minister in Charge of National Emergency Services	Michael Bruxner	Country	Mair	1 February 1939	11 February 1941	2 years, 10 days	
Minister in Charge of National Emergency Services	Hubert Primrose	United Australia	Mair	11 February 1941	16 May 1941	94 days	
Minister for National Emergency Services	Bob Heffron	Labor	McKell (1)	16 May 1941	8 June 1944	3 years, 23 days	
Minister for National Emergency Services	Jack Baddeley	Labor	McKell (2); McGirr (1) (2)	8 June 1944	8 September 1949	5 years, 92 days	
Minister for National Emergency Services	James McGirr	Labor	McGirr (2)	8 September 1949	21 September 1949	13 days	
Minister for Police and Emergency Services	Peter Anderson (Note: Concurrently Minister for Corrective Services between 27 October 1983 and 5 April 1984.)	Labor	Wran (4) (5) (6) (7)	26 May 1982	6 February 1986	3 years, 256 days	
Minister for Police and Emergency Services	George Paciullo	Labor	Wran (8); Unsworth	6 February 1986	21 March 1988	2 years, 44 days	
Minister for Police and Emergency Services	Ted Pickering	Liberal	Greiner (1) (2); Fahey (1) (2)	25 March 1988	23 September 1992	4 years, 211 days	
Minister for Emergency Services	Ted Pickering	Liberal	Fahey (2)	23 September 1992	22 October 1992	4 years, 211 days	
Minister for Emergency Services	Wayne Merton	Liberal	Fahey (2)	22 October 1992	26 May 1993	216 days	
Minister for Emergency Services	Terry Griffiths (Note: Concurrently Minister for Police.)	Liberal	Fahey (3)	26 May 1993	27 June 1994	1 year, 32 days	
Minister for Emergency Services	Garry West	National	Fahey (3)	27 June 1994	4 April 1995	281 days	
Minister for Emergency Services	Bob Debus (Note: Concurrently Minister for Corrective Services.)	Labor	Carr (1)	4 April 1995	1 December 1997	2 years, 241 days	
Minister for Emergency Services	Brian Langton	Labor	Carr (2)	1 December 1997	30 April 1998	150 days	
Minister for Emergency Services	Bob Debus (Note: Concurrently Minister for Corrective Services until 12 January 2001.)	Labor	Carr (2) (3)	30 April 1998	2 April 2003	4 years, 337 days	
Minister for Emergency Services	Tony Kelly	Labor	Carr (4); Iemma (1)	2 April 2003	2 April 2007	4 years, 0 days	
Minister for Emergency Services	Nathan Rees	Labor	Iemma (2)	2 April 2007	5 September 2008	1 year, 156 days	
Minister for Emergency Services	Tony Kelly	Labor	Rees	8 September 2008	30 January 2009	144 days	
Minister for Emergency Services	Steve Whan	Labor	Rees; Keneally	30 January 2009	4 April 2011	2 years, 64 days	
Minister for Police and Emergency Services	Mike Gallacher	Liberal	O'Farrell	4 April 2011	2 May 2014	3 years, 28 days	
Minister for Police and Emergency Services	Stuart Ayres	Liberal	Baird (1)	6 May 2014	1 April 2015	330 days	
Minister for Emergency Services	David Elliott	Liberal	Baird (2)	2 April 2015	30 January 2017	1 year, 303 days	
Minister for Emergency Services	Troy Grant	National	Berejiklian (1)	30 January 2017	23 March 2019	2 years, 52 days	
Minister for Police and Emergency Services	David Elliott	Liberal	Berejiklian (2); Perrottet (1)	2 April 2019	21 December 2021	2 years, 263 days	
Minister for Emergency Services and Resilience	Steph Cooke	National	Perrottet (2)	21 December 2021	28 March 2023	1 year, 97 days	
Minister for Roads	John Graham	Labor	Minns	28 March 2023	5 April 2023	8 days	
Minister for Emergency Services	Jihad Dib	Labor	Minns	5 April 2023	Incumbent	3 years, 227 days	

== Related ministerial titles ==
=== Recovery ===
The individuals have served as Minister for Recovery, or any precedent titles:

Title	Minister	Party	Ministry	Term start	Term end	Time in office	Notes
Minister for Flood Recovery	Steph Cooke	National	Perrottet (2)	9 March 2022	28 March 2023	1 year, 19 days	
Minister for Recovery	Janelle Saffin	Labor	Minns	17 March 2025	incumbent	1 year, 246 days	

== See also ==
- List of New South Wales government agencies
