= Fahey–Murray ministry (1992–1993) =

Second Fahey–Murray ministry
- 83rd Cabinet of Government of New South Wales
- Date formed: 3 July 1992
- Date dissolved: 26 May 1993

People and organisations
- Monarch: Queen Elizabeth II
- Governor: Peter Sinclair
- Premier: John Fahey
- Deputy Premier: Wal Murray
- No. of ministers: 20
- Ministers removed: 1
- Total no. of members: 21
- Member party: Liberal–National coalition
- Status in legislature: Minority Coalition Government
- Opposition parties: Labor
- Opposition leader: Bob Carr

History
- Predecessor: First Fahey ministry
- Successor: Third Fahey ministry

The Fahey–Murray ministry (1992–1993) or Second Fahey–Murray ministry or Second Fahey ministry was the 83rd ministry of the New South Wales Government, and was led by the 38th Premier of New South Wales, John Fahey, representing the Liberal Party in coalition with the National Party, led by Wal Murray.

The ministry covers the period from 3 July 1992 until 26 May 1993, when Murray resigned from the ministry.

== Composition of ministry ==
Ten ministers retained some or all of their portfolios from the first Fahey ministry. (Note: Retained portfolio from the first Fahey ministry.) There were a series of minor reconfigurations of the ministry between August and October 1992, (Note: Ted Pickering took on additional responsibilities with a new role of Assisting the Premier in August 1992.) when Ted Pickering resigned from the police portfolio, accused of misleading parliament and the breakdown of his working relationship with Tony Lauer, the Commissioner of the New South Wales Police, with Pickering and Terry Griffiths swapping portfolios. (Note: In September 1992 Ted Pickering resigned as Minister for Police with Terry Griffiths appointed to the portfolio, while Pickering was appointed to Griffith's portfolio of Justice.) Pickering resigned from the ministry in October 1992. (Note: In October 1992 Ted Pickering resigned from the ministry, replaced by John Hannaford as Vice-President of the Executive Council and Leader of the Government in Legislative Council and Wayne Merton was promoted to the ministry and the portfolios of Justice and Emergency Services.)

The ministry lasted until 26 May 1993, when Murray resigned from the ministry and as the Leader of the New South Wales National Party. Ian Armstrong was elected as the Nationals' Leader, resulting in the formation of the First Fahey–Armstrong ministry.

Portfolio	Minister	Party	Term commence	Term end	Term of office
Premier	John Fahey	Liberal	3 July 1992	26 May 1993	327 days
Treasurer	John Fahey	Liberal	3 July 1992	26 May 1993	327 days
Deputy Premier	Wal Murray	National	3 July 1992	26 May 1993	327 days
Minister for Public Works	Wal Murray	National	3 July 1992	26 May 1993	327 days
Minister for Roads	Wal Murray	National	3 July 1992	26 May 1993	327 days
Minister for Transport	Bruce Baird	Liberal	3 July 1992	26 May 1993	327 days
Minister for Tourism	Bruce Baird	Liberal	3 July 1992	26 May 1993	327 days
Minister for Agriculture and Rural Affairs	Ian Armstrong	National	3 July 1992	26 May 1993	327 days
Minister for Police and Emergency Services	Ted Pickering, MLC	Liberal	3 July 1992	23 September 1992	82 days
Minister for Police	Terry Griffiths	Liberal	23 September 1992	26 May 1993	216 days
Minister for Emergency Services	Ted Pickering, MLC	Liberal	23 September 1992	22 October 1992	29 days
Minister for Emergency Services	Wayne Merton	Liberal	22 October 1992	26 May 1993	245 days
Minister Assisting the Premier	Ted Pickering, MLC	Liberal	31 August 1992	22 October 1992	52 days
Minister for Justice	Terry Griffiths	Liberal	3 July 1992	23 September 1992	82 days
Minister for Justice	Ted Pickering, MLC	Liberal	23 September 1992	22 October 1992	29 days
Minister for Justice	Wayne Merton	Liberal	22 October 1992	26 May 1993	245 days
Vice-President of the Executive Council; Leader of the Government in Legislative Council	Ted Pickering, MLC	Liberal	3 July 1992	22 October 1992	111 days
Vice-President of the Executive Council; Leader of the Government in Legislative Council	John Hannaford, MLC	Liberal	22 October 1992	26 May 1993	245 days
Attorney General	John Hannaford, MLC	Liberal	3 July 1992	26 May 1993	327 days
Minister for Industrial Relations	John Hannaford, MLC	Liberal	3 July 1992	26 May 1993	327 days
Minister for School Education and Youth Affairs	Virginia Chadwick, MLC	Liberal	3 July 1992	26 May 1993	327 days
Minister for Employment and Training	Virginia Chadwick, MLC	Liberal	3 July 1992	26 May 1993	327 days
Minister for Conservation and Land Management	Garry West	National	3 July 1992	26 May 1993	327 days
Minister for Energy	Garry West	National	3 July 1992	26 May 1993	327 days
Minister for Planning	Robert Webster, MLC	National	3 July 1992	26 May 1993	327 days
Minister for Housing	Robert Webster, MLC	National	3 July 1992	26 May 1993	327 days
Minister for Sport, Recreation and Racing	Joe Schipp	Liberal	3 July 1992	26 May 1993	327 days
Minister for State Development	Peter Collins	Liberal	3 July 1992	26 May 1993	327 days
Minister for the Arts	Peter Collins	Liberal	3 July 1992	26 May 1993	327 days
Minister of Natural Resources	Ian Causley	National	3 July 1992	26 May 1993	327 days
Minister for Health	Ron Phillips	Liberal	3 July 1992	26 May 1993	327 days
Minister for Local Government	Gerry Peacocke	National	3 July 1992	26 May 1993	327 days
Minister for Cooperatives	Gerry Peacocke	National	3 July 1992	26 May 1993	327 days
Assistant Treasurer	George Souris	National	3 July 1992	26 May 1993	327 days
Minister for Ethnic Affairs	George Souris	National	3 July 1992	26 May 1993	327 days
Minister for Finance	George Souris	National	14 July 1992	26 May 1993	316 days
Chief Secretary	Anne Cohen	Liberal	3 July 1992	26 May 1993	327 days
Minister for Administrative Services	Anne Cohen	Liberal	3 July 1992	26 May 1993	327 days
Minister for Community Services	Jim Longley	Liberal	3 July 1992	26 May 1993	327 days
Assistant Minister for Health	Jim Longley	Liberal	3 July 1992	26 May 1993	327 days
Minister for the Environment	Chris Hartcher	Liberal	3 July 1992	26 May 1993	327 days
Minister for Consumer Affairs	Kerry Chikarovski	Liberal	3 July 1992	26 May 1993	327 days
Assistant Minister for Education	Kerry Chikarovski	Liberal	3 July 1992	26 May 1993	327 days

Ministers are members of the Legislative Assembly unless otherwise noted.

=== See also ===
- Members of the New South Wales Legislative Assembly, 1991–1995
- Members of the New South Wales Legislative Council, 1991–1995

== Notes ==
New South Wales government ministries
Preceded by First Fahey–Murray ministry (1992)	Second Fahey–Murray ministry 1992–1993	Succeeded by Fahey–Armstrong ministry (1993–1995)
