= Hamilton Knight =

Australian politician (1888–1964)

The Honourable Hamilton Knight
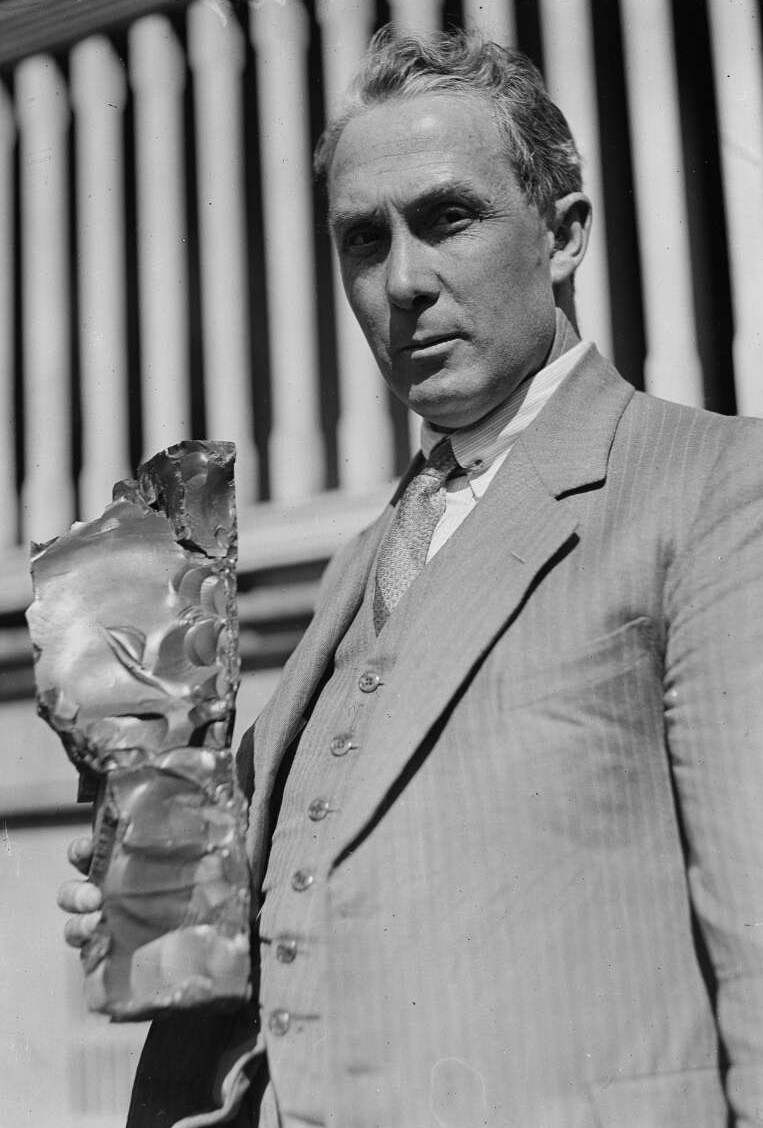

Minister for Labour and Industry and Social Welfare
- In office 16 May 1941 – 29 October 1947
- Preceded by: George Gollan
- Succeeded by: Jack Baddeley

Personal details
- Born: 9 December 1888 Sofala, New South Wales
- Died: 14 January 1964 (aged 75) Marrickville, New South Wales
- Party: Labor Party Australian Labor Party (NSW) Australian Labor Party (Non-Communist)

Hamilton Knight (9 December 1888 – 14 January 1964) was an Australian politician and a member of the New South Wales Legislative Assembly from 1927 until 1947 . During his parliamentary career he was, at various times, a member of the Labor Party (ALP), the Australian Labor Party (NSW) and the Australian Labor Party (Non-Communist). He was the Minister for Labour and Industry and Social Welfare for 6 years during the premiership of William McKell.

== Early and personal life ==
Knight was born in Sofala, New South Wales where his father had been a gold prospector. He was educated to elementary level at state schools near Sofala. At age 19 he traveled to New Zealand, where he worked as a coal miner, became a union activist and worked with his uncle, Bob Semple the Minister for Works in the first New Zealand Labour government. Knight returned to the western coal-fields of New South Wales in 1914 and worked as a miner until he was black-listed by the colliery owners because of his labour agitation in 1917. Attempts at working under an assumed name were unsuccessful but, in 1924, he was eventually employed in a state owned colliery in Lithgow, New South Wales. He was an official of the Miners Federation holding the positions of president of the Western New South Wales division and vice-president of the national federation. Knight was elected as an alderman of Lithgow Municipal Council between 1921 and 1928.

== State Parliament ==
Knight won pre-selection as an ALP candidate for the multi-member seat of Bathurst at the 1925 state election but was placed in the unwinnable third position behind James Dooley and Gus Kelly. When New South Wales reverted to single member electorates at the 1927 election, Knight gained Labor endorsement for the re-created seat of Hartley. He was successful at the general election and held the seat until he resigned in 1947 after being appointed as a Commissioner of the Australian Industrial Relations Commission. He was a supporter of Jack Lang and was a member of his breakaway parties; the Australian Labor Party (NSW) in 1932-1936 and the Australian Labor Party (Non-Communist) in 1940. At the 1935 election he easily defeated a challenge from the former Premier James Dooley, who stood as an Anti-Lang Labor candidate.

== Government ==
With the election of William McKell's Labor government at the 1941 election, Knight was appointed as the Minister for Labour and Industry and Social Welfare . He held this position until his resignation from parliament.

New South Wales Legislative Assembly
Preceded by Recreated seat	Member for Hartley; 1927 – 1947	Succeeded by Jim Chalmers
Political offices
Preceded by George Gollan	Minister for Labour and Industry and Social Welfare; 1941 – 1947	Succeeded by Jack Baddeley
