= Bob Heffron =

Former Premier of New South Wales (1890–1978)

The Honourable Bob Heffron
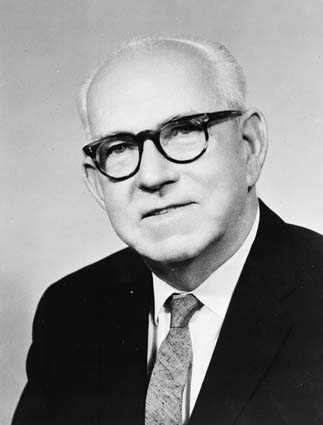
- Heffron as Premier in 1963

30th Premier of New South Wales
- In office 23 October 1959 – 30 April 1964
- Monarch: Elizabeth II
- Governor: Sir Eric Woodward
- Deputy: Jack Renshaw
- Preceded by: Joseph Cahill
- Succeeded by: Jack Renshaw

Minister for Education
- In office 8 June 1944 – 31 May 1960
- Premier: William McKell; James McGirr; Joseph Cahill; Himself
- Preceded by: Clive Evatt
- Succeeded by: Ernest Wetherell

4th Deputy Premier of New South Wales
- In office 23 February 1953 – 28 October 1959
- Premier: Joseph Cahill
- Preceded by: Joseph Cahill
- Succeeded by: Jack Renshaw

Member of the New South Wales Parliament for Botany
- In office 25 October 1930 – 22 May 1950
- Preceded by: Thomas Mutch
- Succeeded by: District abolished

Member of the New South Wales Parliament for Maroubra
- In office 17 June 1950 – 23 January 1968
- Preceded by: New district
- Succeeded by: Bill Haigh

Personal details
- Born: Robert James Heffron; 10 September 1890 Thames, New Zealand
- Died: 27 July 1978 (aged 87) Kirribilli, New South Wales, Australia
- Resting place: Eastern Suburbs Memorial Park
- Party: New Zealand Socialist Party; Victorian Socialist Party; Industrial Labor Party; Australian Labor Party
- Spouse: Jessie Bjornstad (m.1917–1977)
- Children: Maylean Jessie Cordia OAM (1919–2006); June Ellen Healy (1923-2008)

Robert James Heffron (10 September 1890 – 27 July 1978), also known as Bob Heffron or R. J. Heffron, was a long-serving New South Wales politician, union organiser and Australian Labor Party (ALP) Premier of New South Wales from 1959 to 1964. Born in New Zealand, Heffron became involved in various Socialist and labour movements in New Zealand and later Australia before joining the Australian Labor Party. A prominent unionist organiser, he was gaoled for "conspiracy to strike action". He was later elected to the Parliament of New South Wales for Botany in 1930. However his disputes with party leader Jack Lang led to his expulsion from the ALP in 1936 and Heffron formed his own party from disgruntled Labor MPs known as the Industrial Labor Party. The success of his party enabled his readmission to the party and his prominence in a post-Lang NSW Branch which won office in 1941.

Heffron served as Minister of the Crown in the cabinets of William McKell, James McGirr and Joseph Cahill, most notably as Minister for Education from 1944 to 1960 and as Deputy Premier. In his significant tenure as minister for education Heffron oversaw significant reforms through his commissioning of the "Wyndham Report" and the consequent Public Education Act of 1961, and a massive expansion of the state's public schools. He also oversaw the development of higher education services, including the establishment of the New South Wales University of Technology (now the University of New South Wales). Rising to become premier in 1959, he spearheaded a final attempt to abolish the New South Wales Legislative Council via referendum in 1961, which ended in failure. Serving as premier until 1964, Heffron was a member of the New South Wales Legislative Assembly for 37 years until his retirement on 23 January 1968.

== Early years and background ==
"Bob" Heffron (as he was widely known) was born on 10 September 1890 in Thames, New Zealand, the fifth child of Irish-born parents Michael Heffron, a blacksmith, and Ellen Heath. After spending his early education at nearby Hikutaia, Heffron left school at 15 to work in a gold-treating plant while studying metallurgy at the Thames School of Mines. At 19, he went to California to work and to the Yukon in Canada to look for gold; when this proved unsuccessful he returned to New Zealand in 1912.

Heffron joined the New Zealand Socialist Party in 1912 and, becoming a miners' union organiser, was involved in the Waihi miners' strike, an event significant to the development of the labour movement in New Zealand. Appointed an organiser for the Auckland General Labourers' Union, Heffron studied law part-time at Auckland University College, whilst residing at the Heffron family home at 24 Grosvenor Street Grey Lynn. Although having volunteered for military service in the First World War, Heffron was rejected on medical grounds, with the attending doctor citing heart troubles. However, the rejection on the grounds of health was done despite an allegation that Heffron, in an attempt to encourage such a finding, had smoked 12 packs of cigarettes prior to his medical, in order to avoid military service. His elder brother, William Thomas Heffron, enlisted as a private on 3 October 1917 and was killed in action a few days before the armistice on 4 November 1918, while serving with the 1st Battalion, Auckland Infantry Regiment. On 29 December 1917 he married Jessie Bjornstad, the daughter of a Norwegian engineer and they had two daughters, Maylean Jessie and June.

In 1921, the Heffrons moved to Melbourne, Victoria. That same year in Victoria, Heffron was appointed an organiser for the Federated Clothing Trades of the Commonwealth of Australia and also joined the leftist Victorian Socialist Party. Later in 1921 he moved to Sydney, becoming the secretary of the New South Wales branch of the Federated Marine Stewards' and Pantrymen's Association of Australasia. As the union's state secretary, a role he held for ten years, he took a prominent role in maritime trade unionism in Sydney. In February 1924, when the Commonwealth & Dominion Line steamer Port Lyttelton was declared 'Black' by the Labor Council of New South Wales owing to various worker's disputes and the ship having been declared unseaworthy, Heffron and six other union representatives acted to advise members of the Seamen's Union to refuse to work on the Port Lyttelton. For this, in April the government of Sir George Fuller had Heffron and the six other unionists arrested on the charge of conspiracy to strike action. Although controversially refused bail by the trial judge, Heffron and his fellow defendants, represented by Richard Windeyer KC and H. V. Evatt, were found not guilty and released in July 1924 by the court, a verdict that had been returned by the direction of the judge. Later joining the Australian Labor Party, at the time he showed himself to be a supporter of party leader Jack Lang, supporting Lang's successful motion at the 1923 state conference to readmit James Dooley to the party.

== Early political career ==
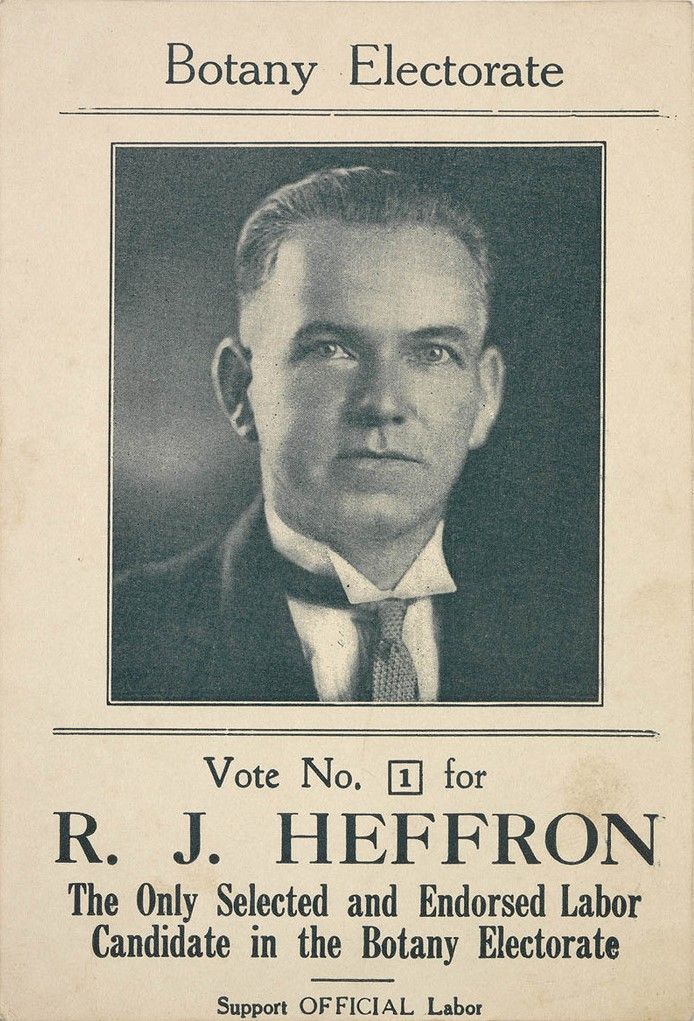
Heffron election pamphlet for the seat of Botany at the 1927 election.

Having confirmed his Lang credentials, Heffron stood as the endorsed Labor party candidate for the seat of Botany at the 1927 election, which was held by Thomas Mutch, who had split from party after a stoush with Lang and stood as an 'Independent Labor' candidate after being denied preselection. A contest marked by clashes and accusations of rorting, Heffron was ultimately unsuccessful, gaining only 45% of the vote. He was eventually successful at the next election in 1930, defeating Mutch, and held Botany until its abolition in 1950.

While his support for Lang had enabled Heffron to accelerate his political career, he found himself increasingly unhappy with Lang's autocratic and divisive political style, which had been amplified by the Great Depression, the expulsion of the NSW branch of the Labor Party from the federal branch and the ultimate dismissal of Lang's government in 1932 by Governor Sir Philip Game. After Labor's defeats at the hands of the United Australia Party (UAP) at the 1932 and 1935 state elections, Heffron became associated with a small group in caucus and in the NSW Labor Council who aimed to depose Lang as leader. However, while Heffron's movement was based on his personal stronghold in his Botany–Maroubra ALP branches and the left-wing trade unions, Lang maintained majority control of the caucus, party machine and the party newspaper, Labor Daily.

=== Industrial Labor Party ===
When Labor Council Secretary Robert King organised a conference of dissident left-wing unions on 1 August 1936, which was attended by Heffron and three other caucus members, Lang summoned a special party conference on 22 August which expelled Heffron, King and all the other leaders who attended the conference. As a result, Heffron, along with his colleague Carlo Lazzarini and others, formed the Industrial Labor Party (ILP), which was also known as the 'Heffron Labor Party'. Despite their expulsion, Heffron and the new ILP did increasingly well against Lang and the Labor Party, winning two subsequent by-elections in the seats of Hurstville (won by Clive Evatt) and Waverley (won by Clarrie Martin). In June 1939, three other MPs, Frank Burke (Newtown), Mat Davidson (Cobar) and Ted Horsington (Sturt), unhappy with Lang's leadership joined the ILP. As a result of its success, John Curtin and the federal executive of the ALP pressured the NSW ALP to readmit Heffron and his party at a unity conference at the Majestic Theatre in Newtown on 26 August 1939 Heffron then combined forces with William McKell to depose Lang on 5 September 1939, with McKell becoming the new leader of the party, although he declined to stand for the position of deputy leader.

== Minister of the Crown ==
=== National Emergency Services ===
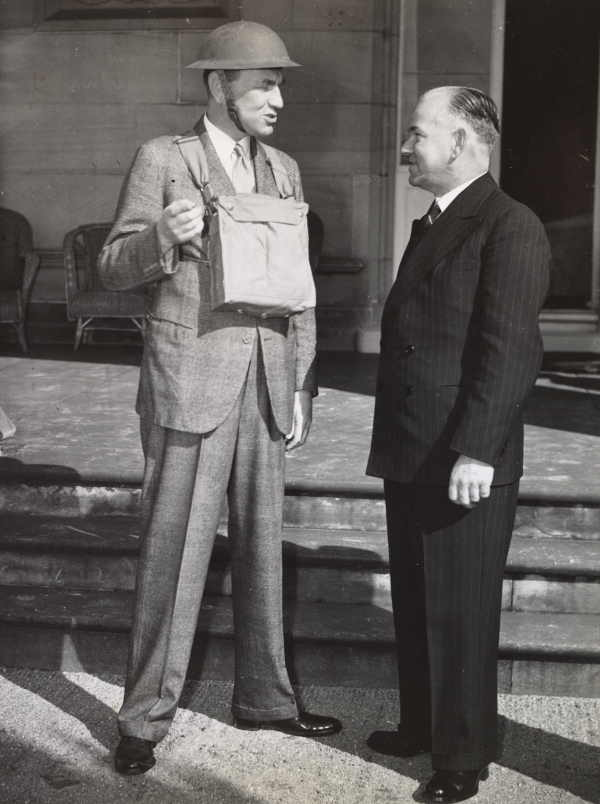
Heffron (right) with Governor Lord Wakehurst, discussing air-raid safety measures following the implementation of the National Emergency Act 1941.

When the Labor Party eventually regained office under McKell, defeating Alexander Mair and the UAP at the May 1941 election, Heffron was elevated to the ministry as Minister for National Emergency Services, charged with the implementation of the National Emergency Services Act, and the administration of National Emergency Services, New South Wales. In this role he was responsible for the civil defence and air-raid precautions of New South Wales, which became increasingly more important after the entry of Japan in the Second World War in December 1941 and subsequent attacks on Australia on Darwin and Sydney in 1942. Serving until 8 June 1944, Heffron advocated public vigilance whilst in this portfolio, declaring: "We are living in a fool's paradise in Australia ... Many people have the idea that what is happening in other countries cannot happen here."

Heffron also clashed with the Federal Government's imposition of National Emergency Services procedures, most notably over the imposition of brownouts for the city of Sydney. In the Legislative Assembly in November 1942, Heffron denounced the advisers of the Federal Government who continued to maintain the brown-out as an essential defence measure: "The only conclusion I can come to, is that the brown-out was born of a form of panic when Japan entered the war and it has continued because of a few brass hats will not look at the facts and the evidence of the fighting men, but persist in sticking to their first conclusion. The position, therefore, is ludicrous." Heffron later affirmed that the brown-out was completely unnecessary as a black-out, with short notice given, was a more effective and safer defensive measure.

=== Minister for Education ===
Appointed by McKell as Minister for Education in June 1944, Heffron authored in 1946 a comprehensive policy for the New South Wales education system entitled: Tomorrow is Theirs: The Present and Future of Education in New South Wales. As minister during the important post-war era of economic growth and infrastructure development, Heffron presided over the expansion in the number and facilities of the public schools in NSW, with enrolments in all areas doubling in size.

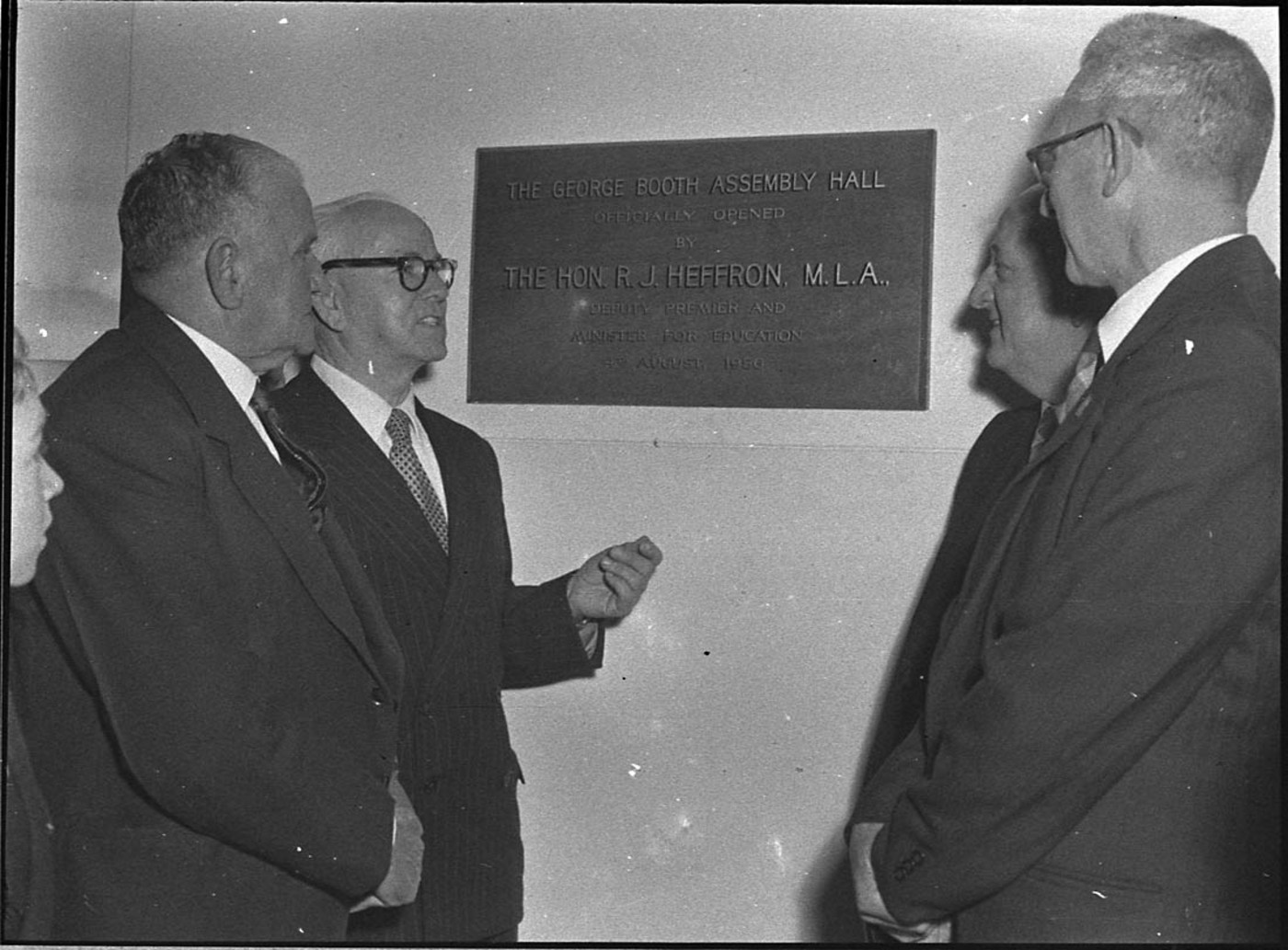
Heffron (centre) unveils the 'George Booth Assembly Hall' at the newly opened Kurri Kurri High School, 9 September 1956.

In November 1952 he appointed Harold Wyndham as the director-general of education, and commissioned him to chair a committee tasked to completely review the Secondary education system in New South Wales and make recommendations for improvements. The committee's report, popularly referred to as "The Wyndham Report", was presented to Heffron in October 1957 and gave rise to the Public Education Act of 1961, being brought into effect in 1962, during Heffron's term as premier. Key amongst the changes was the objective of presenting all students with the opportunity to experience a wide range of subjects, including visual arts, industrial arts, music and drama, and a wide range of languages. The five-year secondary school system was abandoned in favour of adding another year to the course, with major statewide external examinations at the end of the tenth (School Certificate) and the twelfth (Higher School Certificate) years of schooling.

Heffron's reformist attitude in education also extended to the tertiary level, in which he intended to significantly expand NSW's capacity for higher-level learning. On 9 July 1946 he presented a proposal to the cabinet outlining the creation of a technological-based university in NSW, as a separate institution to the existing Sydney Technical College and a year later cabinet authorised the appointment of a Developmental Council, chaired by Heffron, to bring the new tertiary institution into existence. First meeting in August 1947, the council established all the guidelines and regulations that would set-up the future institution and by March 1948, 46 students had already enrolled to study.

This institution, now named the "New South Wales University of Technology", gained its statutory status through the enactment of 'New South Wales University of Technology Act 1949', which was carried by Heffron's firm support of its cause: "the Government ... is fully alive to the need in a democratic country to extend facilities to students who, for financial reasons, cannot attend present full-time university courses". This was the first time that a second university was to be established in any Australian state. With the establishment of this institution receiving opposition by some areas in the media and conservatives, Heffron came to its defence in an article published in the Sydney Morning Herald on 4 May 1949, noting: "I feel that this new institution should be given time to prove its worth through the quality and work of its graduates". In September 1958 Heffron moved the bill to change the name of the New South Wales University of Technology to the University of New South Wales following the recommendations of the Murray Report that had proposed the expansion of its focus from technology into such fields as medicine and arts. When several opposition MPs objected during debate on the basis of it posing a threat to the status of the University of Sydney, with one joking that it could be called "Heffron University", Heffron came to the defence of the university and dismissed the objections as "absurd". In 1950 Heffron's seat of Botany was abolished and largely replaced by Maroubra, which he was subsequently elected to and held until his retirement in 1968.

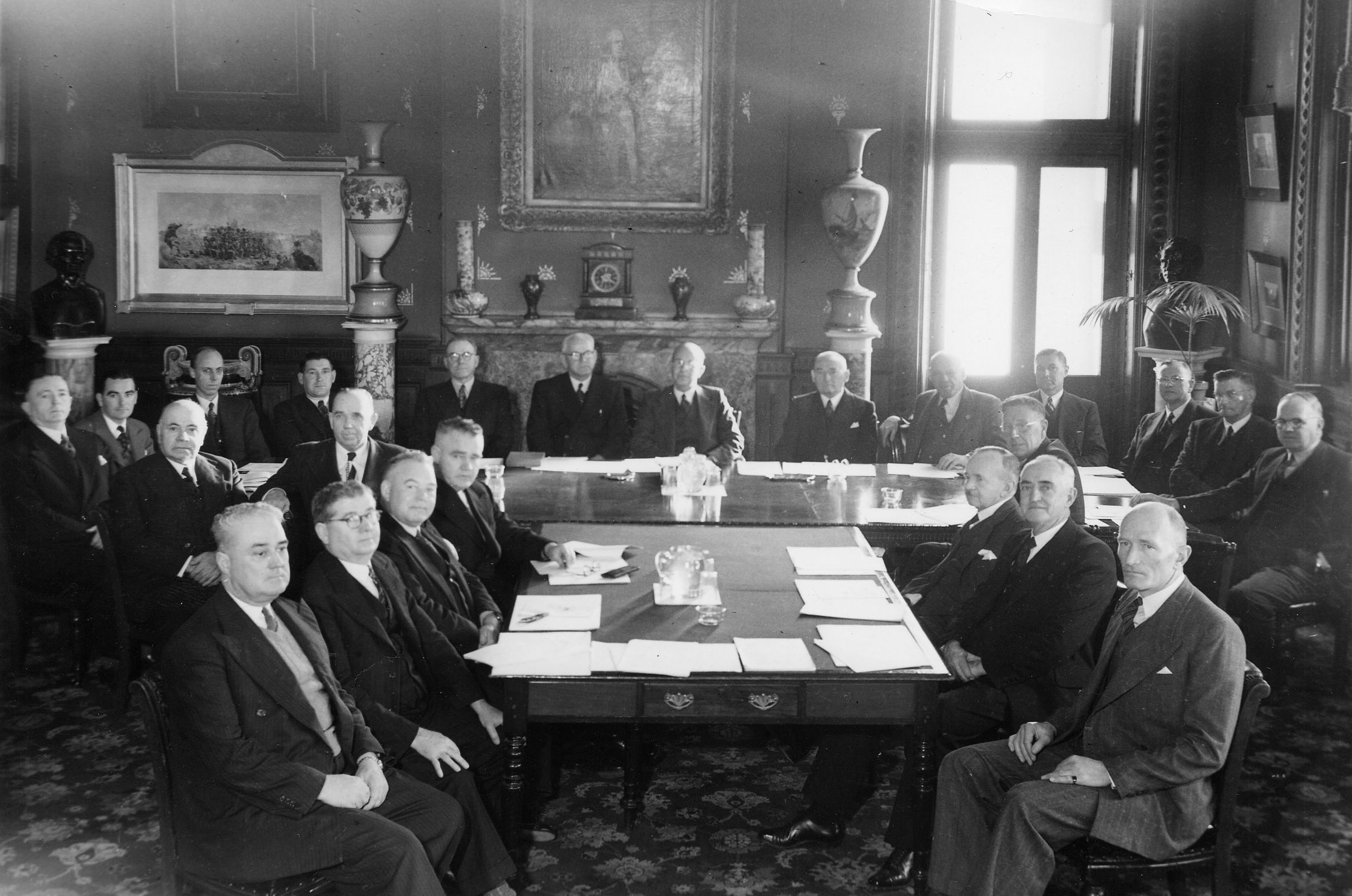
Heffron (centre, beneath mantlepiece) at the New South Wales University of Technology council's first meeting in July 1949

Meanwhile, Heffron, who supported a general policy of decentralising tertiary education across the state, directed his department to begin the establishment of various Teachers' Colleges in New South Wales, to provide sufficient tertiary training to the expanding numbers of teachers filling the new schools and colleges across the state. Among them was the Newcastle Teachers' College, established in 1949 and opened in 1950, which facilitated growing calls from the city of Newcastle for a more permanent University in the city. In May 1951, Heffron indicated his support for the establishment of a satellite college of Sydney University in Newcastle as an initial step towards the establishment of a full university. By July Heffron sought to approach Sydney University officials to facilitate efforts "to have a university established in Newcastle as soon as possible", and noted that his moves to purchase land in the city as the site of this college was an indication of the government's intentions: "I didn't buy that site in Newcastle just for fun. I want to provide a university in Newcastle and I want that to be only the first step in providing universities all over the state". However, by the time Heffron opened the Newcastle University College (NUC) on 3 December 1951, no affiliation had been finalised. By May 1952, a University Establishment Group had gained much momentum but Heffron had been notified by Premier Joseph Cahill that there were insufficient funds available for the establishment of another full university. Nevertheless, in early 1954 this college had become a college of the New South Wales University of Technology. As premier, in late 1961 Heffron moved with his Minister for Education, Ernest Wetherell, that the Newcastle University College would become a full university "come what may". This was achieved when on 12 March 1962, the University of Technology Vice-Chancellor Philip Baxter notified the NUC Warden, Professor James Auchmuty, that it would be allowed to take on full autonomy to become the University of Newcastle from 1 January 1965.

In 1951 Heffron also played a role in the establishment of the University of New England (UNE) when he discussed with the University of Sydney on its thoughts about training and certifying schoolteachers by external studies and/or correspondence courses. The university rejected the idea, stating that external degree or certification programs would be significantly inferior to residence education. Undeterred, Heffron asked New England about its willingness to conduct external studies. The warden of the New England University College (and later first vice chancellor of UNE) Robert Madgwick enthusiastically supported the idea and instructed his college's staff to begin preparing an external studies program. Heffron asked the University of Sydney if it had any objection to New England being granted independence to operate the state's external education program. The university replied that it had no objection. As a result, Heffron introduced the 'University of New England Act' to parliament in early December 1953, it received assent on 16 December 1953 and the college became the independent University of New England on 1 February 1954.

=== Deputy premier and leadership ===
Throughout his period in the cabinet, Heffron was seen as a prominent and well-performing member of the government, and as such a potential contender for the premiership. The first opportunity for Heffron came in February 1946, when McKell announced to the Labor caucus of his intention to resign before the 1947 election. McKell, with the intention of ensuring Heffron as his successor, remained as an MP even after Prime Minister Joseph Chifley had announced his appointment as Governor-General in order to vote for Heffron. At the ballot on 5 February 1947, Heffron lost by two votes to the Minister for Housing, James McGirr, who was favoured by the more Catholic and conservative caucus members. When McGirr announced his resignation on the grounds of ill health on 1 April 1952, Heffron put himself forward as a candidate to succeed him against, among others, Deputy Premier Joseph Cahill. However, the day before the ballot on 3 April, Heffron had been made aware that he would not have the numbers in caucus to win against Cahill and consequently made arrangements with Cahill to give the votes of his bloc to Cahill, in exchange for his support to become Deputy Premier. As a result, on 3 April Cahill defeated Attorney General Clarrie Martin 32 votes to 14 to become premier and Heffron defeated Mines Secretary Joshua Arthur 32 votes to 14 to become deputy premier.

When Heffron's former opponent Arthur resigned from the ministry on 23 February 1953 when a Royal Commission was set up to investigate his involvement in corrupt business activity, Heffron was commissioned to replace him as Secretary for Mines, serving from February to September 1953. As deputy premier, Heffron acted in Cahill's absence and in times of infirmity, which included receiving the Japanese prime minister Nobusuke Kishi, on his arrival at Sydney Airport on 31 October 1957, the first visit of a Prime Minister of Japan to Australia. Heffron's role as deputy became of prime importance when Cahill died suddenly in October 1959, and the 68-year-old Heffron was elected to succeed him unopposed.

== Premier of New South Wales ==
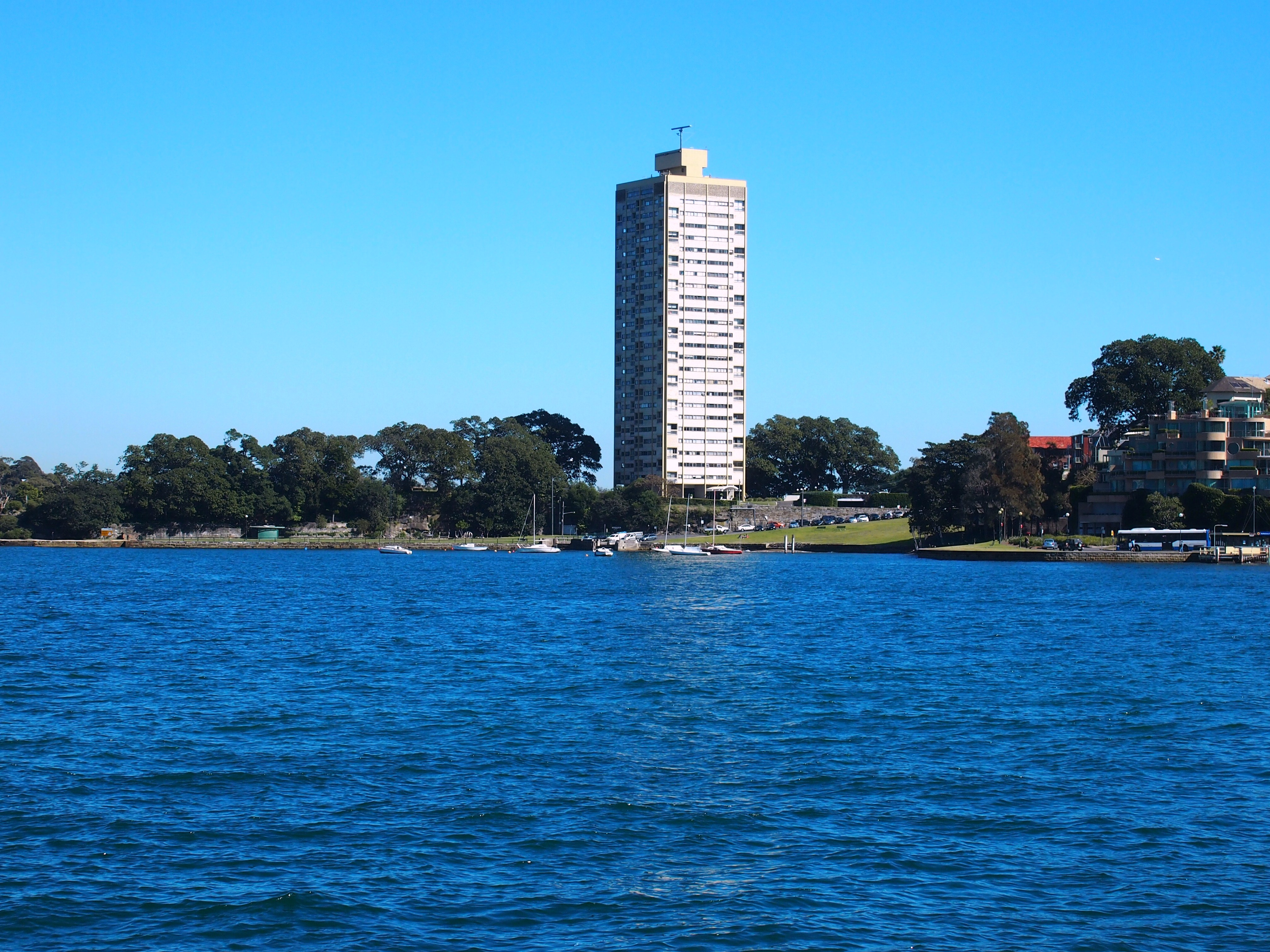
Blues Point Tower was one of the first strata title schemes in NSW following the Strata Titles Act

Heffron became premier, being sworn in with his cabinet on 23 October 1959 at Government House, Sydney by Governor Sir Eric Woodward. However, his time as premier was marked by significant tensions within the Labor Party in NSW and nationally, where although a split involving the Democratic Labor Party had been avoided during Cahill's term, the sectarian and factional undercurrent in the party was very much present in what was increasingly perceived as a tired and divided government. Indeed, the 68-year-old Heffron's government consisted mostly of MPs and Ministers who had come in with McKell after the 1941 election. In parliament, Heffron tended to reflect this by leaving most of the speaking roles to his deputy Jack Renshaw and local government and highways minister Pat Hills. It was clear to many that the aged Heffron's best days as a politician were behind him, as future Labor political advisor Richard Hall noted in The Bulletin: "In the House he tends to ramble on, recalling past glories as Minister for Education or Minister for Emergency Services in answer to questions. In an age where clichés cloak most politicians, Heffron throws them out as though they were devastating retorts, although occasionally the old radical has shown his teeth, flashed into anger, and for a few minutes reminded us that this was the great mob-orator who led many bitter strikes." His old nemesis Jack Lang also took the opportunity to take a last swipe at him, ridiculing Heffron in his newspaper, Century, as "Mr Magoo".

Nevertheless, his government remained a reformist one, with investments in planning reforms, infrastructure and development. On 14 October 1960, Heffron presided over the official opening of Warragamba Dam, the completion of which meant that it became the primary reservoir and the first reliable water supply for the whole Sydney catchment. At the opening, Heffron declared: "We have come along way from the Tank Stream, Sydney's first water supply". In early 1961, in response to lobbying from Lendlease, Heffron's government (led by Minister for Justice, Jack Mannix) undertook a significant groundbreaking reform for apartment buildings by introducing Strata title schemes, the first such system in the world, which enabled separate ownership of units outside of company and co-operative titles and allowed for unit owners to more easily gain finance and loans. The Conveyancing (Strata Titles) Act 1961 came into effect from 1 July 1961.

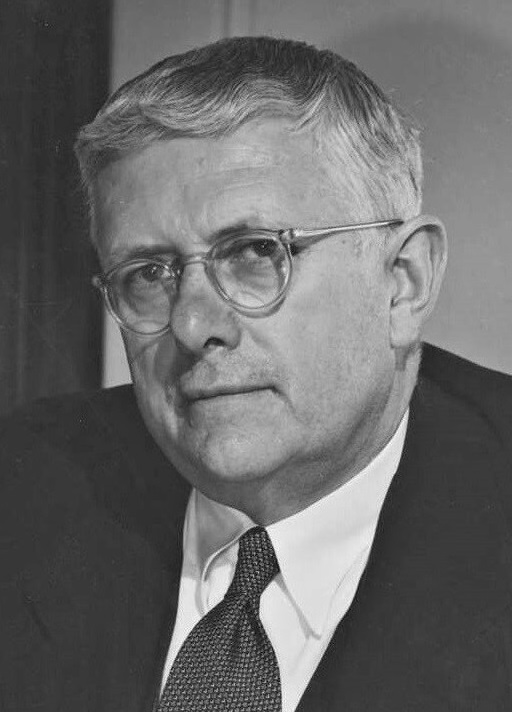
Heffron's nomination of H. V. Evatt as Chief Justice of New South Wales in 1960 proved highly controversial.

=== Evatt as chief justice ===
In January 1960 Heffron provided his old friend H. V. Evatt a dignified exit from federal politics by nominating him to succeed Sir Kenneth Street as Chief Justice of New South Wales. His Attorney General Reg Downing, however, was horrified, having favoured the senior puisne justice Sir William Owen as the most suitable candidate while also realising that Evatt's worsening health would render him less than equal to the task of chief justice. Therefore, while Downing, as attorney general, would normally be the person to move the nomination of chief justice in cabinet, he refused to do so, leaving Heffron to do it himself. Heffron's motion to nominate Evatt was passed narrowly by 8 votes to 6. Downing's concerns came to pass as Evatt indeed proved highly ineffective, often wracked by mental and physical ill-health, was reduced to having most of his judgements written or co-written for him, and resigning in 1962 after only two years as chief justice.

=== Legislative Council abolition ===
Heffron in 1960.

Upon his elevation as premier Heffron, following an approved motion from the 1958 state conference, reanimated the longstanding Labor policy to abolish the Legislative Council of New South Wales by announcing a statewide referendum on this question. Heffron had long supported this policy from his Langite days, seeing the council as an outdated bastion of conservative privilege, a position that was echoed by trade union official and member of the legislative council, Tom Dougherty, who had pushed through a rule at the 1952 state conference that banned MLCs from becoming members of the state party executive. However, Heffron's efforts found themselves up against significant opposition, not only from the Liberal and Country parties but also within the Labor party itself. Indeed, when the 'Constitution Amendment (Legislative Council Abolition) Bill' came before the legislative council on 2 December 1959, the council resolved 33 votes to 25 to send it back to the Legislative Assembly on the grounds that such a bill should have originated in the council. This was passed with the support of seven Labor councillors crossing the floor (including Cyril Cahill, Anne Press and Donald Cochrane), who were all subsequently expelled from the party and formed the Independent Labor Group.

On 6 April 1960, Heffron attempted to send the bill back to the council, which returned it to the assembly on the same grounds as before. As a result of the deadlock, Heffron requested the governor to order a joint session of parliament on 20 April, a session which lasted two hours and was boycotted by the opposition. On 12 May the Assembly resolved that the bill be submitted for a referendum. However, later that day the leader of the opposition in the legislative council, Hector Clayton, started legal action against the government on the grounds that under section 5B of the NSW Constitution, the council had neither voted nor deliberated on the bill and thus the bill could not be submitted for a referendum. In the case of Clayton v. Heffron (1960) a majority of the full bench of the Supreme Court of New South Wales (headed by Chief Justice Evatt) found in favour of the government four to one on the grounds that they had complied fully with the intention of section 5B. In a subsequent case for special leave to appeal to the High Court, Clayton argued that section 15 of the Commonwealth Constitution, which dealt with the process by which state parliaments filled senate vacancies, entrenched the requirement for such parliaments to be bicameral on account of its exclusive mention of both houses. This was rejected by the court that affirmed that the mention did not exclude the right of state parliaments to do as they saw fit regarding abolition or reform.

In January 1961, Heffron announced the date of the referendum for 29 April 1961 and affirmed that it would be a simple yes/no question and would not include "alternative proposals such as retaining the Upper House on an elective basis". Heffron launched the government's 'Yes' campaign on 5 April 1961 imploring the electorate to: "get rid of a parliamentary anachronism and an obstruction to elected government", noting that when the council was hostile to government "it was denying justice to those who elected the Government" and when it was friendly to the government "it was wasting time and money by being a carbon copy of the Legislative Assembly". However, despite the lack of time allocated for a campaign, the Liberal/Country opposition led by Robert Askin and Charles Cutler, despite rallying around a moderate slogan of "retain and reform", spearheaded a strong campaign centred on warnings of a Labor-dominated single house subject to "Communist and Trades Hall influence". Askin promised to fight abolition "from one end of the state to the other" while Cutler also promised an "all-out campaign" alongside the Liberals. By contrast Heffron and Labor's campaign was described as extremely "tame" and "lacklustre", having been weakened against the fact that any criticism of the legislative council also included its Labor members, with some Labor backbench MLAs terming the council "the union officials club".

As a result, the referendum on 29 April was categorically rejected with 802,512 votes (42.4%) for abolition and 1,089,193 votes (57.5%) against. This was the last attempt to abolish the council and, as the first time the NSW Labor party had lost a state poll in many years, was widely seen as the beginning of the end for the Labor government, which had been in power since 1941. Heffron's supporter Dougherty resigned from the council a month later in protest of the result.

=== Second term ===
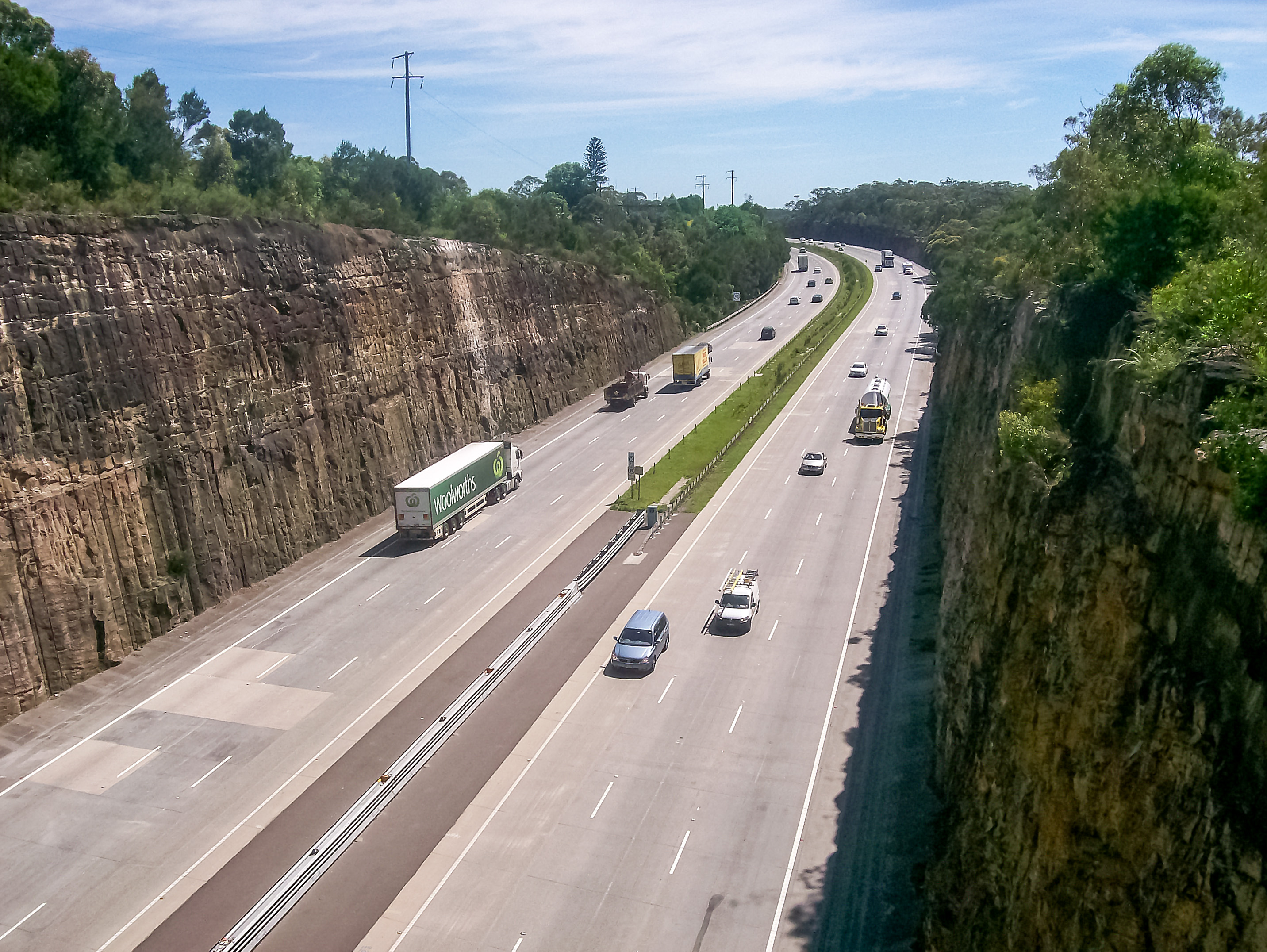
The Sydney–Newcastle Freeway at Berowra. Heffron made its construction as a toll-road a priority for his government, with work beginning on the first stage in April 1963.

At the 1962 election Heffron, despite the damage to prestige represented by the failed referendum, put forward new policies including the establishment of a Department of Industrial Development to reduce unemployment, free school travel, aid to home buyers and commencing the construction of the Sydney–Newcastle Freeway as a toll-road. At the election the Labor Party increased its margin by 5 seats, leaving a comfortable majority in the new parliament, although its success was attributed to the unpopularity at the time of Sir Robert Menzies' federal Liberal government following the 1961 credit squeeze.

Another one of Heffron's election promises, namely a Royal Commission into the legalisation of off-course betting, caused considerable tension with his own cabinet. His Attorney General Reg Downing favoured its legalisation through a government-supervised Totalisator Agency Board (TAB) while his Chief Secretary Gus Kelly favoured legalising the activities of existing SP bookmakers. Downing however, went over Heffron's head and procured an ALP State Executive order requiring the establishment of a TAB. When the Final Report of Commission was handed down on 29 March 1963, echoing the position of Downing, Heffron was obliged to carry out the establishment of the TAB.

Another issue arose when Cardinal Norman Gilroy presented Heffron in September 1962 with a plan for State aid to Catholic Church schools, including assistance for teacher salaries and capital grants for buildings, an issue that was highly explosive in the sectarian politics of New South Wales at the time. Heffron, alive to the need for a limited form of state support to placate sectarian conflict that could destroy the government, permitted Treasurer Jack Renshaw to include state support for school laboratories and a means-tested allowance to school students in the 1963 budget. Heffron later dropped the school laboratory provision but his permitting of the means-tested allowance provoked condemnation from the Federal Party Executive in Adelaide on 30 September 1962, who were less interested in placating the traditional Catholic hierarchy and more informed by the bitterness of the earlier ALP/DLP split in the party in 1955. Heffron and Renshaw backed down on this last provision, leaving no state aid for Catholic schools, and affirming the dominance of the Federal party in such matters.

Six months later on 30 April 1964, Heffron, tired after several decades in ministerial office, resigned as premier at the age of 73. His announcement came as a surprise to many members of his own party, although there had been existing hints in the previous months that the Labor caucus had been discussing a departure plan for Heffron, to be replaced by the Deputy Premier Renshaw. Heffron insisted that he had made the decision to himself a year prior, declaring: "It was purely my own decision, so I cannot complain about anyone throwing me out or advising me to get out. Sometimes we are advised to get out – there are hints, but we don't take any notice when they come from outside, but it is not the same, of course, as coming from your own party." Renshaw succeeded him as premier. Having been embarrassed when addressed as "Excellency" on an overseas trip as Minister for Education in 1954, Heffron was nevertheless granted by Queen Elizabeth II retention of the title "The Honourable" on 24 June 1964 for having served for more than three years as a member of the Executive Council of New South Wales.

== Later life ==
Portrait of Heffron by Henry Hanke (1956), Oil on canvas, UNSW Art Collection.

After resigning as premier, Heffron remained in Parliament as member for Maroubra, retaining his seat at the 1965 election, thereby witnessing his Labor Party enter opposition for the first time in twenty-five years. He stayed for one more term until his retirement in January 1968, marking thirty-seven years in Parliament. In his valedictory speech, Heffron remarked:

"In looking back on my life, I express happiness that I did go into politics. If anybody had then said to me that I would become a Minister of the Crown, I should have thought that I would be the last card in the pack. When I see these young fellows in the Ministry, it reminds me of when I was beating about back in the dark days of the depression. Had anybody then suggested that I would become a Premier of New South Wales, I should have considered that man a suitable candidate for Callan Park. However, with the passage of time, these things happen, and it then becomes a matter of doing one's best. That is what I have tried to do over the years."

— Parliament, 7 December 1967.

In youth a Roman Catholic, he spent most of his adulthood – unusually for a New South Wales Labor politician at the time – outside the Roman Church, describing himself as a "proselytising rationalist". In his later years he became more attached to the beliefs of his youth, and became the first Australian statesman to be received by Pope Paul VI during an official visit to the Vatican in July 1963. Having spent many years living in a house at 266 Maroubra Road, Maroubra, in retirement the Heffrons lived in the North Shore suburb of Kirribilli, in a new apartment block at 14/1 Elamang Avenue. His wife Jessie died aged 84 on 7 July 1977 at Kirribilli Private Hospital while Heffon was also admitted there as a patient. He died aged 87 at the same hospital on 27 July 1978, survived by his two daughters. Heffron was granted a State funeral with a service at St Stephen's Uniting Church, Sydney that was attended by over 200 people including Governor Roden Cutler, Premier Neville Wran and former Premiers McKell, Renshaw, Robert Askin, Tom Lewis and Eric Willis, before being sent for burial at Eastern Suburbs Crematorium in Matraville, which he had officially opened as the local Member of Parliament in May 1938. In Heffron's condolence motion in the Legislative Assembly on 15 August 1978, Wran reflected on Heffron's achievements:

"The importance of his term as Minister for Education lies not merely in its record length of sixteen years; it lies in the unprecedented challenges of those years and the way he met them. Because of the seminal importance of those years, Mr Heffron could well lay claim to be father of the modern education system in New South Wales. [...] These were years not only of vast expansion in the number of schools and pupils; they were also years of great experimentation and innovation reflecting deep changes in community attitudes to the purposes of education. The Heffron years established for the first time that equality of opportunity in education was the right of all, not just of the privileged few."

— Neville Wran, 15 August 1978.

== Honours and legacy ==
In 1947 Heffron was honoured by the Royal Australian Historical Society by being made an Honorary Fellow. Heffron was made an honorary Doctor of Letters by the University of Sydney on 29 August 1952, with his citation reading:

"Robert James Heffron's whole political career has shown him to be a man of deep sincerity of purpose and with the courage of his convictions, 'One who never turned his back, but marched breastforward.' It is, in consequence, not surprising that under his ministerial aegis we see the results of his educational zeal and enthusiasm in the rapid growth of the Child Welfare Department, which he has raised to a level equal to the best overseas, in the expansion of library and other cultural facilities, in the planning and creation of new schools, colleges and institutes of higher learning, and last, but not least, in the unfailing sympathy he has always shown with our own University and in his ready understanding of its more pressing problems."

— Hon.D.Litt. citation.

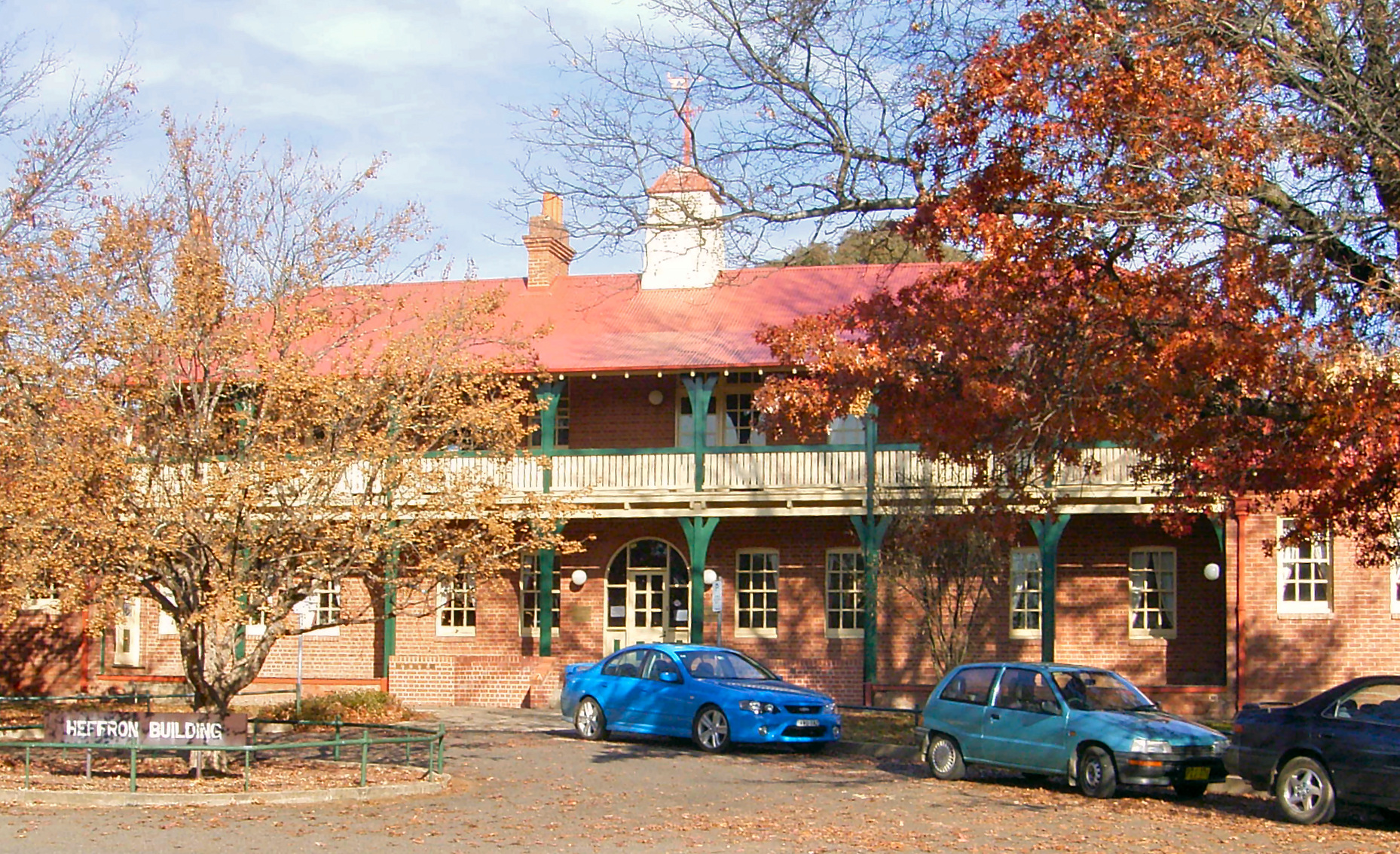
Heffron Building, Bathurst campus, CSU

Heffron was also awarded an Honorary Doctor of Science at the New South Wales University of Technology's first graduation ceremony to be held on the Kensington campus on 16 April 1955. The citation noted that Heffron "has played a vital role in the founding and early development of this university and remains a sympathetic and wise counsellor to our cause ... His name is written indelibly into the history of the New South Wales University of Technology". In 1956 his portrait, depicting him in the Scarlet and Old Gold robes of his honorary D.Sc., was painted by Henry Hanke, entered into that year's Archibald Prize, and was purchased by the university for its collection in 1957. In 1962, the now University of New South Wales, in honour of his role in its establishment and his continuing support, named its newest building after him as the "Robert Heffron Building", it was renamed the Australian School of Business in 2008 and is now the UNSW Business School. He was also made an honorary Doctor of Letters by the University of New England in 1956. As a Member of Parliament, he received the King George VI Coronation Medal (1937) and the Queen Elizabeth II Coronation Medal (1953).

Heffron was appointed as a member of the board of directors of the Prince Henry Hospital in his electorate at Little Bay on 21 August 1942, and was subsequently reappointed in 1947, 1950, 1953, 1956 and 1959. Heffron served as chairman of the board from September 1950, officially unveiled the Memorial Clock Tower in April 1953, and was both a board member and chair until he resigned upon becoming premier in November 1959. In 1961 the hospital named the Ward Block A building of its 1935 extension as "Heffron House" in recognition of his 17 years on the board.

In 1962, in honour of Heffron's role in establishing the school in 1950, South Sydney Boys' High School named its library after him as the "R. J. Heffron Library". The nearby Randwick Boys High School had done the same to its new library when Heffron opened the school on 11 March 1959 and when Heffron officially opened the new assembly hall of the East Hills Boys High School on 6 August 1959, the hall was named the "R. J. Heffron Hall" in his honour. On 14 June 1966, the Sydney City Council resolved to name the newly built community hall on Burton Street, Darlinghurst, after him as "Heffron Hall". In 2014, despite opposition led by Labor Councillor Linda Scott, the hall was renamed the "East Sydney Community and Creative Arts Centre, incorporating Heffron Hall and Albert Sloss Reserve" as part of major renovations. In 1973, the New South Wales Electoral Commission named the new state electorate of Heffron after him and it covers much of his former electorate of Botany. The Charles Sturt University Faculty of Education building in its Bathurst Campus was also named after Heffron in honour of his role in the establishment of the preceding Bathurst and Wagga Wagga Teacher's Colleges (now the CSU Bathurst and Wagga Wagga campuses). Heffron Park and Heffron Road in Maroubra are named after him, as is Heffron Road in Lalor Park. His first daughter, Maylean, married Dutch sailor Pieter Cordia in 1945, was a trained nurse who worked at Prince Henry Hospital, led efforts to create the Coast Chapel in the hospital in 1967, and was awarded the Medal of the Order of Australia in 2005 for her efforts to save the heritage of the Prince Henry Hospital, which included the building named after her father forty years previously.

== Citations ==
New South Wales Legislative Assembly
Preceded by Thomas Mutch	Member for Botany; 1930–1950	District abolished
New district	Member for Maroubra; 1950–1968	Succeeded by Bill Haigh
Political offices
Preceded by Hubert Primrose	Minister for National Emergency Services; 1941–1944	Succeeded by Jack Baddeley
Preceded by Clive Evatt	Minister for Education; 1944–1960	Succeeded by Ernest Wetherell
Preceded by Joshua Arthur	Secretary for Mines; 1953	Succeeded by Francis Buckley
Preceded by Joseph Cahill	Deputy Premier of New South Wales; 1953–1959	Succeeded by Jack Renshaw
Preceded by Joseph Cahill	Treasurer of New South Wales; 1959	Succeeded by Jack Renshaw
Preceded by Joseph Cahill	Premier of New South Wales; 1959–1964	Succeeded by Jack Renshaw
Party political offices
New political party	Leader of the Industrial Labor Party; 1938–1939	Party subsumed into ALP
Preceded by Joseph Cahill	Deputy Leader of the Australian Labor Party (NSW Branch); 1953–1959	Succeeded by Jack Renshaw
Preceded by Joseph Cahill	Leader of the Australian Labor Party (NSW Branch); 1959–1964	Succeeded by Jack Renshaw
