= Jack Baddeley =

Australian politician (1881–1953)

The Honourable Jack Baddeley
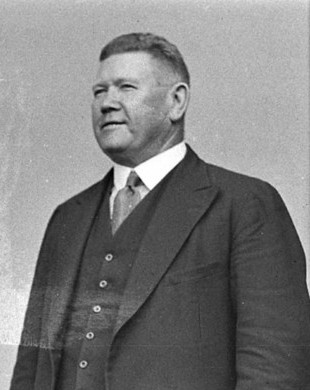

2nd Deputy Premier of New South Wales
- In office 16 May 1941 – 8 September 1949
- Premier: William McKell; James McGirr
- Preceded by: Sir Michael Bruxner
- Succeeded by: Joseph Cahill

Personal details
- Born: 20 November 1881 Burslem, Staffordshire, United Kingdom
- Died: 1 July 1953 (aged 71) Darlinghurst, New South Wales, Australia

John Marcus Baddeley (20 November 1881 – 1 July 1953) was an Australian politician and member of the New South Wales Legislative Assembly from 25 March 1922 to 8 September 1949.

== Early life ==
Baddeley was born in Burslem, Staffordshire, England and migrated to Australia with his family at the age of two. He was educated at Merewether public school, but left at eleven to do odd jobs in the Glebe colliery near Merewether and then worked as a coal miner. in 1902 he married Harriet Churchill and they went on to have two sons and three daughters. He moved to Cessnock in 1908 to work at Neath Colliery and later at Aberdare Extended Colliery. He became a cricketer, first-grade footballer and militant socialist trade union leader. He was a councillor of Cessnock Shire from January until October 1914 and was the first president of the Australian Coal and Shale Employees' Federation from 1915 until 1922.

== Political career ==
Baddeley was the Labor Party member for Newcastle from 1922 to 1927 and member for Cessnock from 1927 until 1949. He was Secretary for Mines and Minister for Labour and Industry in the first (June 1925 to October 1927) and second Lang governments (November 1930 to May 1932). He supported Lang during the Labor factionalism of the 1930s, but he supported McKell's election as leader in 1939.

He was Deputy Premier, Colonial Secretary and Secretary for Mines in the McKell and McGirr governments from May 1941 until his retirement in September 1947, Minister for National Emergency Services from June 1944 to his retirement and Minister for Labour and Industry and Social Welfare from October 1947 to March 1948. Fauna As a keen student of natural history, he is also credited as the instigator of the Fauna Protection Act 1948 (NSW). He was acting Premier from August to December 1948, when he had a heart attack.

Baddeley was chairman of State Coal Mine Authority from his retirement until his death of cerebrovascular disease at St Luke's Hospital in the Sydney suburb of Darlinghurst, survived by his wife, two sons and three daughters.

New South Wales Legislative Assembly
Preceded by John Estell	Member for Newcastle; 1922–1927; With: Connell, Cromarty/Booth, Murray, Skelton	Succeeded by Peter Connolly
New district	Member for Cessnock; 1927–1949	Succeeded by John Crook
Political offices
Preceded by John Fitzpatrick	Secretary for Mines; 1925–1927	Succeeded by Frank Chaffey
Preceded by Ernest Farrar	Minister for Labour and Industry; 1925–1927	Succeeded by Ernest Farrar
Preceded by Reginald Weaver	Secretary for Mines; 1930–1932	Succeeded by Frank Chaffey
Preceded by Ernest Farrar	Minister for Labour and Industry; 1930–1932	Succeeded by John Dunningham
Preceded by Sir Michael Bruxner	Deputy Premier of New South Wales; 1941–1949	Succeeded by Joseph Cahill
Preceded by Alwyn Tonking	Chief Secretary; 1941–1949	Succeeded by James McGirr
Preceded by Roy Vincent	Secretary for Mines; 1941–1949	Succeeded by James McGirr
Preceded by Bob Heffron	Minister for National Emergency Services; 1944–1949	Succeeded by James McGirr
Preceded by Hamilton Knight	Minister for Labour and Industry and Social Welfare; 1947–1948	Succeeded by Frank Finnan
Party political offices
Preceded by Bill Dunn	Deputy Leader of the Australian Labor Party (NSW Branch); 1923–1949	Succeeded by Joseph Cahill
