= Secretary for Mines (New South Wales) =

Government minister in the colony of New South Wales

Secretary for Mines of New South Wales
- Appointer: Governor of New South Wales
- Formation: 9 May 1874
- First holder: James Farnell
- Final holder: Don Harwin
- Abolished: 2 April 2019
- Succession: Minister for Energy and Environment

The Secretary for Mines was a ministry first established in 1874 in the first ministry of Henry Parkes. It went through various title changes, becoming the Minister for Mines in 1959 then variations on Minister for Mineral Resources.

== Role and responsibilities ==
In 1872-3 there was a rush of application for mineral leases covering 750,000 acres (300,000 ha), which were required to be dealt with by the Secretary for Lands. The ministry was created from the responsibilities of the Secretary for Lands and the first minister, James Farnell, was also the Secretary for Lands. The initial tasks for the minister were establishing the Board of Mines, a school of mines and mineralogical museum. The minister was responsible for the department of mines, which included mining wardens, registrars, bailiffs and surveyors. The department also included agricultural regulation, including sheep and cattle inspectors and the registration of brands.

The agricultural responsibilities were recognised from 1890 when the title was changed to Secretary for Mines and Agriculture, until 1907 when a separate Minister for Agriculture was created. In 1959 the ministry was renamed Minister for Mines.

The resources portfolio was occasionally combined with the energy portfolio between 1984 and 2017.

== List of ministers ==
| Title | Minister | Party | Term start | Term end | Time in office | Notes |
|---|---|---|---|---|---|---|
| Secretary for Lands and Secretary for Mines | James Farnell | No party | 9 May 1874 | 26 July 1874 | 78 days | |
| Secretary for Mines | Robert Abbott | No party | 27 July 1874 | 8 February 1875 | 196 days | |
| Secretary for Mines | John Lucas | No party | 9 February 1875 | 5 February 1877 | 1 year, 362 days | |
| Secretary for Mines | George Lloyd | No party | 6 February 1877 | 16 August 1877 | 191 days | |
| Secretary for Mines | Ezekiel Baker | No party | 17 August 1877 | 19 November 1877 | 94 days | |
| Secretary for Mines | Archibald Jacob | No party | 20 November 1877 | 17 December 1877 | 27 days | |
| Secretary for Mines | William Suttor Jr. | No party | 18 December 1877 | 20 December 1878 | 1 year, 2 days | |
| Secretary for Mines | Ezekiel Baker | No party | 21 December 1878 | 11 October 1881 | 2 years, 294 days | |
| Secretary for Mines | Arthur Renwick | No party | 12 October 1881 | 4 January 1883 | 1 year, 84 days | |
| Secretary for Mines | Joseph Abbott | No party | 5 January 1883 | 6 October 1885 | 2 years, 274 days | |
| Secretary for Mines | Francis Wright | No party | 7 October 1885 | 17 October 1885 | 10 days | |
| Secretary for Mines | George Thornton | No party | 13 November 1885 | 21 December 1885 | 38 days | |
| Secretary for Mines | Robert Vaughn | No party | 22 December 1885 | 25 February 1886 | 65 days | |
| Secretary for Mines | James Fletcher | No party | 26 February 1886 | 23 December 1886 | 300 days | |
| Secretary for Mines | Charles Mackellar | No party | 24 December 1886 | 19 January 1887 | 26 days | |
| Secretary for Mines | Francis Abigail | Free Trade | 20 January 1887 | 16 January 1889 | 1 year, 362 days | |
| Secretary for Mines | John Chanter | Protectionist | 17 January 1889 | 7 March 1889 | 49 days | |
| Secretary for Mines | Sydney Smith | Free Trade | 8 March 1889 | 27 February 1890 | 2 years, 228 days | |
| Secretary for Mines and Agriculture | Sydney Smith | Free Trade | 28 February 1890 | 22 October 1891 | 2 years, 228 days | |
| Secretary for Mines and Agriculture | Thomas Slattery | Protectionist | 23 October 1891 | 2 August 1894 | 2 years, 283 days | |
| Secretary for Mines and Agriculture | Sydney Smith | Free Trade | 3 August 1894 | 15 August 1898 | 4 years, 12 days | |
| Secretary for Mines and Agriculture | Joseph Cook | Free Trade | 27 August 1898 | 13 September 1899 | 1 year, 17 days | |
| Secretary for Mines and Agriculture | John Fegan | Protectionist | 15 September 1899 | 8 April 1901 | 1 year, 205 days | |
| Secretary for Mines and Agriculture | John Kidd | Progressive | 10 April 1901 | 29 August 1904 | 3 years, 141 days | |
| Secretary for Mines and Agriculture | Samuel Moore | Liberal Reform | 29 August 1904 | 1 October 1907 | 3 years, 33 days | |
| Secretary for Mines and Agriculture | John Perry | Liberal Reform | 2 October 1907 | 21 January 1908 | 111 days | |
| Secretary for Mines | William Wood | Liberal Reform | 22 January 1908 | 20 October 1910 | 2 years, 271 days | |
| Secretary for Mines | Alfred Edden | Labor | 21 October 1910 | 29 January 1914 | 3 years, 100 days | |
| Secretary for Mines | John Cann | Labor | 29 January 1914 | 15 March 1915 | 1 year, 45 days | |
| Secretary for Mines | John Estell | Labor | 15 March 1915 | 31 October 1916 | 1 year, 230 days | |
| Secretary for Mines | Henry Hoyle | Labor | 31 October 1916 | 15 November 1916 | 15 days | |
| Secretary for Mines | John Fitzpatrick | Nationalist | 15 November 1916 | 12 April 1920 | 3 years, 149 days | |
| Secretary for Mines | George Cann | Labor | 12 April 1920 | 20 December 1921 | 1 year, 252 days | |
| Secretary for Mines | John Fitzpatrick | Nationalist | 20 December 1921 | 20 December 1921 | 7 hours | |
| Secretary for Mines | George Cann | Labor | 20 December 1921 | 13 April 1922 | 113 days | |
| Secretary for Mines | John Fitzpatrick | Nationalist | 13 April 1922 | 17 June 1925 | 3 years, 65 days | |
| Secretary for Mines | Jack Baddeley | Labor | 17 June 1925 | 18 October 1927 | 2 years, 123 days | |
| Secretary for Mines | Frank Chaffey | Nationalist | 18 October 1927 | 15 April 1929 | 1 year, 179 days | |
| Secretary for Mines | Reginald Weaver | Nationalist | 16 April 1929 | 3 November 1930 | 1 year, 202 days | |
| Secretary for Mines | Jack Baddeley | Labor | 4 November 1930 | 15 October 1931 | 1 year, 191 days | |
| Secretary for Mines | Jack Baddeley | Labor (NSW) | 15 October 1931 | 13 May 1932 | 1 year, 191 days | |
| Secretary for Mines | Frank Chaffey | United Australia | 16 May 1932 | 17 June 1932 | 32 days | |
| Secretary for Mines | Roy Vincent | Country | 18 June 1932 | 16 May 1941 | 8 years, 332 days | |
| Secretary for Mines | Jack Baddeley | Labor | 16 May 1941 | 8 September 1949 | 8 years, 115 days | |
| Secretary for Mines | James McGirr | Labor | 8 September 1949 | 21 September 1949 | 13 days | |
| Secretary for Mines | William Dickson | Labor | 21 September 1949 | 30 June 1950 | 282 days | |
| Secretary for Mines | Joshua Arthur | Labor | 30 June 1950 | 23 February 1953 | 2 years, 238 days | |
| Secretary for Mines | Bob Heffron | Labor | 23 February 1953 | 16 September 1953 | 205 days | |
| Secretary for Mines | Francis Buckley | Labor | 16 September 1953 | 30 June 1954 | 2 years, 88 days | |
| Secretary for Mines | William Gollan | Labor | 1 July 1954 | 15 March 1956 | 1 year, 259 days | |
| Secretary for Mines | Roger Nott | Labor | 15 March 1956 | 14 November 1957 | 1 year, 244 days | |
| Secretary for Mines | Jim Simpson | Labor | 14 November 1957 | 1 April 1959 | 7 years, 180 days | |
| Minister for Mines | Jim Simpson | Labor | 1 April 1959 | 13 May 1965 | 7 years, 180 days | |
| Minister for Mines | Tom Lewis | Liberal | 13 May 1965 | 27 June 1967 | 2 years, 45 days | |
| Minister for Mines | Wal Fife | Liberal | 27 June 1967 | 3 January 1975 | 7 years, 190 days | |
| Minister for Mines | George Freudenstein | Country | 3 January 1975 | 14 May 1976 | 1 year, 131 days | |
| Minister for Mines | Pat Hills | Labor | 14 May 1976 | 19 October 1978 | 2 years, 158 days | |
| Minister for Mineral Resources and Development | Ron Mulock | Labor | 19 October 1978 | 29 February 1980 | 2 years, 348 days | |
| Minister for Mineral Resources | Ron Mulock | Labor | 29 February 1980 | 2 October 1981 | 2 years, 348 days | |
| Minister for Mineral Resources | Neville Wran | Labor | 2 October 1981 | 1 February 1983 | 1 year, 122 days | |
| Minister for Mineral Resources | Kevin Stewart | Labor | 1 February 1983 | 10 February 1984 | 1 year, 9 days | |
| Minister for Mineral Resources | Don Day | Labor | 10 February 1984 | 5 April 1984 | 55 days | |
| Minister for Mineral Resources and Energy | Peter Cox | Labor | 5 April 1984 | 6 February 1986 | 1 year, 307 days | |
| Minister for Mineral Resources | Ken Gabb | Labor | 4 July 1986 | 26 November 1987 | 2 years, 44 days | |
| Minister for Minerals and Energy | Ken Gabb | Labor | 26 November 1987 | 21 March 1988 | 2 years, 44 days | |
| Minister for Mineral Resources | Neil Pickard | Liberal | 21 March 1988 | 19 October 1988 | 3 years, 73 days | |
| Minister for Minerals and Energy | Neil Pickard | Liberal | 19 October 1988 | 6 June 1991 | 3 years, 73 days | |
| Minister of Natural Resources | Ian Causley | National | 6 June 1991 | 26 May 1993 | 3 years, 306 days | |
| Minister for Mines | Ian Causley | National | 26 May 1993 | 4 April 1995 | 3 years, 306 days | |
| Minister for Mineral Resources | Bob Martin | Labor | 4 April 1995 | 8 April 1999 | 4 years, 4 days | |
| Minister for Mineral Resources | Eddie Obeid | Labor | 8 April 1999 | 2 April 2003 | 3 years, 359 days | |
| Minister for Mineral Resources | Kerry Hickey | Labor | 2 April 2003 | 3 August 2005 | 2 years, 123 days | |
| Minister for Mineral Resources | Ian Macdonald | Labor | 3 August 2005 | 4 December 2009 | 4 years, 305 days | |
| Minister for Mineral and Forest Resources | Ian Macdonald | Labor | 4 December 2009 | 4 June 2010 | 4 years, 305 days | |
| Minister for Mineral and Forest Resources | Paul McLeay | Labor | 4 June 2010 | 1 September 2010 | 89 days | |
| Minister for Mineral and Forest Resources | Steve Whan | Labor | 6 September 2010 | 28 March 2011 | 209 days | |
| Minister for Resources and Energy | Chris Hartcher | Liberal | 3 April 2011 | 4 December 2013 | 2 years, 245 days | |
| Minister for Resources and Energy | Anthony Roberts | Liberal | 4 December 2013 | 2 April 2015 | 3 years, 57 days | |
| Minister for Industry, Resources and Energy | Anthony Roberts | Liberal | 2 April 2015 | 30 January 2017 | 3 years, 57 days | |
| Minister for Resources | Don Harwin | Liberal | 30 January 2017 | 2 April 2019 | 2 years, 62 days | |
