= Electoral results for the district of Cumberland (New South Wales) =

Election results for Cumberland, New South Wales, Australia

Cumberland, an electoral district of the Legislative Assembly in the Australian state of New South Wales was created in 1920 and abolished in 1927.

| Election | Member | Party | Member | Party | Member | Party |
|---|---|---|---|---|---|---|
| 1920 | Voltaire Molesworth | Labor | Bruce Walker | Nationalist | Ernest Carr | Nationalist |
| 1922 | Voltaire Molesworth | Labor | Bruce Walker | Nationalist | William FitzSimons | Nationalist |
| 1922 | James McGirr | Labor | Bruce Walker | Nationalist | William FitzSimons | Nationalist |
| 1925 | James McGirr | Labor | Bruce Walker | Nationalist | William FitzSimons | Nationalist |
| 1926 appointment | James McGirr | Labor | Bruce Walker | Nationalist | James Shand | Nationalist |

== Election results ==
=== Elections in the 1920s ===
==== 1926 appointment ====
William FitzSimons died on 20 March 1926. Between 1920 and 1927 the Legislative Assembly was elected using a form of proportional representation with multi-member seats and a single transferable vote (modified Hare-Clark). The Parliamentary Elections (Casual Vacancies) Act, provided that casual vacancies were filled by the next unsuccessful candidate on the incumbent member's party list. James Shand was the only unsuccessful Nationalist candidate at the 1925 election and took his seat on 22 September 1926.

==== 1925 ====
1925 New South Wales state election: Cumberland
| Party | Candidate | Votes | % | ±% |
|---|---|---|---|---|
| Quota | | 7,885 | | |
| Nationalist | William FitzSimons (elected 1) | 8,959 | 28.4 | +2.6 |
| Nationalist | Bruce Walker Sr (elected 2) | 7,989 | 25.3 | +2.3 |
| Nationalist | James Shand | 4,010 | 12.7 | +12.7 |
| Labor | James McGirr (elected 3) | 7,102 | 22.5 | −3.1 |
| Labor | Robert Bingham | 1,621 | 5.1 | +5.1 |
| Progressive | Reginald Harris | 826 | 2.6 | +2.6 |
| Progressive | Aaron Morris | 121 | 0.4 | +0.4 |
| Progressive | Arthur Upchurch | 47 | 0.2 | +0.2 |
| Independent | Ernest Carr | 330 | 1.1 | +1.1 |
| Independent | John Allaburton | 124 | 0.4 | +0.4 |
| Total formal votes | | 31,537 | 97.3 | +0.3 |
| Informal votes | | 882 | 2.7 | −0.3 |
| Turnout | | 32,419 | 68.9 | −1.1 |
Party total votes
| Nationalist | | 20,958 | 66.4 | −4.9 |
| Labor | | 9,131 | 29.0 | +2.9 |
| Progressive | | 994 | 3.2 | +0.6 |
| Independent | Ernest Carr | 330 | 1.1 | +1.1 |
| Independent | John Allaburton | 124 | 0.4 | +0.4 |

==== 1922 ====
1922 New South Wales state election: Cumberland
| Party | Candidate | Votes | % | ±% |
|---|---|---|---|---|
| Nationalist | William FitzSimons (elected 1) | 7,498 | 25.8 | +25.8 |
| Nationalist | Bruce Walker (elected 3) | 6,701 | 23.0 | +0.8 |
| Nationalist | Ernest Carr (defeated) | 6,555 | 22.5 | +9.0 |
| Labor | Voltaire Molesworth (elected 2) | 7,434 | 25.6 | +2.4 |
| Labor | Charles York | 145 | 0.5 | +0.5 |
| Progressive | Edwin Crowther | 326 | 1.1 | +1.1 |
| Progressive | Albert Smith | 293 | 1.0 | +1.0 |
| Progressive | Reuben Jenner | 138 | 0.5 | +0.5 |
| Total formal votes | | 29,090 | 97.0 | +4.6 |
| Informal votes | | 883 | 3.0 | −4.6 |
| Turnout | | 29,973 | 70.0 | +15.7 |
Party total votes
| Nationalist | | 20,754 | 71.3 | +22.8 |
| Labor | | 7,579 | 26.1 | −4.4 |
| Progressive | | 757 | 2.6 | −10.6 |

==== 1920 ====
1920 New South Wales state election: Cumberland
| Party | Candidate | Votes | % | ±% |
|---|---|---|---|---|
| Quota | | 4,655 | | |
| Nationalist | Bruce Walker Sr (elected 2) | 4,142 | 22.2 | |
| Nationalist | Ernest Carr (elected 3) | 2,520 | 13.5 | |
| Nationalist | William FitzSimons | 2,364 | 12.7 | |
| Labor | Voltaire Molesworth (elected 1) | 4,315 | 23.2 | |
| Labor | Albert Jones | 1,096 | 5.9 | |
| Labor | Francis Lagerlow | 259 | 1.4 | |
| Soldiers & Citizens | Charles Hely | 442 | 2.4 | |
| Soldiers & Citizens | William Armstrong | 334 | 1.8 | |
| Independent | William Crittenden | 681 | 3.7 | |
| Total formal votes | | 18,617 | 92.4 | |
| Informal votes | | 1,539 | 7.6 | |
| Turnout | | 20,156 | 54.3 | |
Party total votes
| Nationalist | | 9,026 | 48.5 | |
| Labor | | 5,670 | 30.5 | |
| Progressive | | 2,464 | 13.2 | |
| Soldiers & Citizens | | 776 | 4.2 | |
| Independent | William Crittenden | 681 | 3.7 | |
