= Electoral district of Cumberland =

Electoral district of Cumberland may refer to several former districts in Australia:

- Electoral district of Cumberland Boroughs (NSW Legislative Council), New South Wales (1843-1856)
- Electoral district of Cumberland Boroughs, New South Wales (1856–1859)
- Electoral district of Cumberland (North Riding), New South Wales (1856–1859)
- Electoral district of Cumberland (South Riding), New South Wales (1856–1859)
- Electoral district of Cumberland (New South Wales) (1920–1927)
- Electoral district of Cumberland (Tasmania) (1856–1909)
