= Electoral results for the district of Cook's River =

Election results for Cook's River, New South Wales, Australia

Cook's River, an electoral district of the Legislative Assembly in the Australian state of New South Wales was created in 1941 and abolished in 1973.

Election	Member	Party
1941	Joseph Cahill	Labor
1944	Joseph Cahill	Labor
1947	Joseph Cahill	Labor
1950	Joseph Cahill	Labor
1953	Joseph Cahill	Labor
1956	Joseph Cahill	Labor
1959	Joseph Cahill	Labor
1959 by	Tom Cahill	Labor
1962	Tom Cahill	Labor
1965	Tom Cahill	Labor
1968	Tom Cahill	Labor
1971	Tom Cahill	Labor

== Election results ==
=== Elections in the 1970s ===
==== 1971 ====
1971 New South Wales state election: Cook's River
Party	Candidate	Votes	%	±%
Labor	Tom Cahill	17,427	66.1	+1.0
Liberal	Kenneth McKimm	8,920	33.9	−1.0
Total formal votes		26,347	96.3	
Informal votes		1,010	3.7	
Turnout		27,357	92.2	
Labor hold		Swing	+1.0	

=== Elections in the 1960s ===
==== 1968 ====
1968 New South Wales state election: Cook's River
Party	Candidate	Votes	%	±%
Labor	Tom Cahill	17,821	69.2	−0.7
Liberal	James Harris	7,962	30.9	+0.7
Total formal votes		25,783	96.6	
Informal votes		895	3.4	
Turnout		26,678	93.3	
Labor hold		Swing	−0.7	

==== 1965 ====
1965 New South Wales state election: Cook's River
Party	Candidate	Votes	%	±%
Labor	Thomas Cahill	15,675	69.8	−4.6
Liberal	Louis Mamo	6,774	30.2	+4.6
Total formal votes		22,449	97.5	−0.9
Informal votes		564	2.5	+0.9
Turnout		23,013	94.7	−0.5
Labor hold		Swing	−4.6	

==== 1962 ====
1962 New South Wales state election: Cook's River
Party	Candidate	Votes	%	±%
Labor	Tom Cahill	17,447	74.4	+3.5
Liberal	Sidney Pitkethly	5,999	25.6	+1.3
Total formal votes		23,446	98.4	
Informal votes		389	1.6	
Turnout		23,835	95.2	
Labor hold		Swing	−0.1	

=== Elections in the 1950s ===
==== 1959 by-election ====
1959 Cook's River by-election Saturday 12 December
Party	Candidate	Votes	%	±%
Labor	Tom Cahill	14,283	72.55	+1.61
Liberal	John Bampton	4,488	22.80	−1.45
Communist	Walter Buckley	916	4.65	+4.65
Total formal votes		19,687		
Informal votes		364	1.82	
Turnout		20,051	84.48	
Labor hold		Swing	+1.61	

Joseph Cahill (Labor) died. The Labor Party retained the seat on an improved margin, which was nonetheless significant due to the large personal vote for Cahill and sympathy after his death which was then carried by his son.

==== 1959 ====
1959 New South Wales state election: Cook's River
Party	Candidate	Votes	%	±%
Labor	Joseph Cahill	16,111	70.9	
Liberal	Athol McCoy	5,507	24.2	
Independent	Charles Higbid	1,094	4.8	
Total formal votes		22,712	98.3	
Informal votes		392	1.7	
Turnout		23,104	95.3	
Two-party-preferred result
Labor	Joseph Cahill	16,931	74.5	
Liberal	Athol McCoy	5,781	25.5	
Labor hold		Swing		

==== 1956 ====
1956 New South Wales state election: Cook's River
Party	Candidate	Votes	%	±%
Labor	Joseph Cahill	13,591	65.2	−34.8
Independent	William Kendrick	4,135	19.8	+19.8
Liberal	James Skehan	2,302	11.0	+11.0
Communist	Edward Rowe	830	4.0	+4.0
Total formal votes		20,858	97.6	
Informal votes		516	2.4	
Turnout		21,374	94.6	
Two-candidate-preferred result
Labor	Joseph Cahill	14,751	70.7	−29.3
Independent	William Kendrick	6,107	29.3	+29.3
Labor hold		Swing	N/A	

==== 1953 ====
1953 New South Wales state election: Cook's River
Party	Candidate	Votes	%	±%
Labor	Joseph Cahill	unopposed		
Labor hold				

==== 1950 ====
1950 New South Wales state election: Cook's River
Party	Candidate	Votes	%	±%
Labor	Joseph Cahill	15,878	74.6	
Liberal	Donald Clark	4,774	22.4	
Independent	Henry McPhillips	624	2.9	
Total formal votes		21,276	97.9	
Informal votes		454	2.1	
Turnout		21,730	95.1	
Two-party-preferred result
Labor	Joseph Cahill		75.0 (Note: Two party preferred vote was estimated.)	
Liberal	Donald Clark		25.0	
Labor hold		Swing		

=== Elections in the 1940s ===
==== 1947 ====
1947 New South Wales state election: Cook's River
Party	Candidate	Votes	%	±%
Labor	Joseph Cahill	13,972	65.6	−34.4
Lang Labor	John Hamilton	7,337	34.4	+34.4
Total formal votes		21,309	96.8	
Informal votes		708	3.2	
Turnout		22,017	95.4	
Labor hold		Swing	N/A	

==== 1944 ====
1944 New South Wales state election: Cook's River
Party	Candidate	Votes	%	±%
Labor	Joseph Cahill	unopposed		
Labor hold				

==== 1941 ====
1941 New South Wales state election: Cook's River
Party	Candidate	Votes	%	±%
Labor	Joseph Cahill	13,616	73.9	
Independent Labor	John Simpson	4,804	26.1	
Total formal votes		18,420	95.5	
Informal votes		877	4.5	
Turnout		19,297	94.0	
Labor notional hold		Swing		
