= Electoral results for the district of Cumberland =

Electoral results for the district of Cumberland may refer to several former districts in Australia:

- Electoral results for the district of Cumberland Boroughs, New South Wales (1856–1859)
- Electoral results for the district of Cumberland (North Riding), New South Wales (1856–1859)
- Electoral results for the district of Cumberland (South Riding), New South Wales (1856–1859)
- Electoral results for the district of Cumberland (New South Wales) (1920–1927)
