= Electoral results for the district of Cumberland Boroughs =

Election results for Cumberland Boroughs, New South Wales, Australia

Cumberland Boroughs, an electoral district of the Legislative Assembly in the Australian state of New South Wales was created in 1856 and abolished in 1859.

Election	Member	Party
1856	William Bowman	None
1858	William Dalley	None

== Election results ==
=== 1858 ===
1858 New South Wales colonial election: Cumberland Boroughs 22 January
Candidate	Votes	%
William Dalley (elected)	246	52.1
William Bowman (defeated)	168	35.6
William Redman	58	12.3
Total formal votes	472	100.0
Informal votes	0	0
Turnout	472	65.7

William Dalley had been defeated as a sitting member for Sydney City.

=== 1856 ===
1856 New South Wales colonial election: Cumberland Boroughs
Candidate	Votes	%
William Bowman (elected)	129	28.2
Ralph Robey	124	27.1
William Redman	115	25.1
Robert Ross	90	19.7
Total formal votes	458	100.0
Informal votes	0	0.0
Turnout	458	65.9

Polling was conducted on 8 April 1856. Bowman represented this seat in the old Legislative Council.
