= Thurlow House =

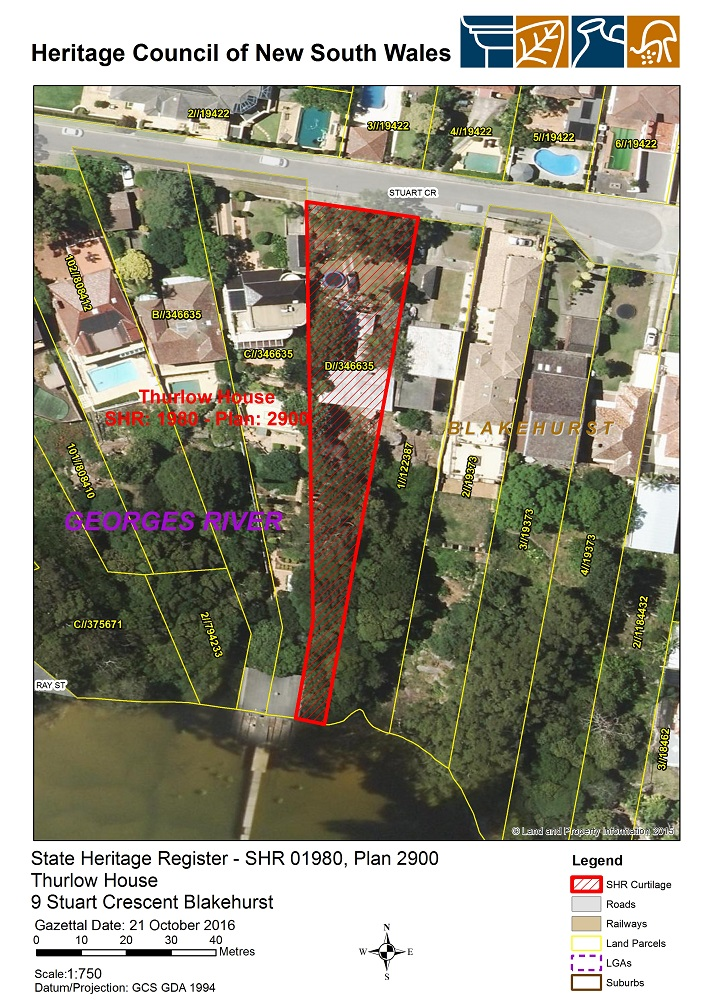
- Heritage boundaries

- Location within Sydney Location within Australia
- 33°59′56″S 151°06′23″E
- Location: 9 Stuart Crescent, Blakehurst, Georges River Council, New South Wales, Australia

History
- Built: 1953–1954

Site notes
- Architect: Harry Seidler

New South Wales Heritage Register
- Official name: Thurlow House
- Type: State heritage (built)
- Designated: 21 October 2016
- Reference no.: 1980
- Type: House
- Category: Residential buildings (private)

Thurlow House is a heritage-listed residence at 9 Stuart Crescent, Blakehurst in the Georges River Council local government area of New South Wales, Australia. It was designed by Harry Seidler and built from 1953 to 1954. It was added to the New South Wales State Heritage Register on 21 October 2016.

== History ==
=== Early Colonial ownership ===
The site of 9 Stuart Crescent is part of 36 hectares (88 acres) (Portion 250 of the Parish of St George) granted to merchant and brewer John Terry Hughes, the nephew of wealthy emancipated convict merchant Samuel Terry, and his business partner John Hosking, who was also the second mayor of Sydney. They were granted the land on 26 August 1840.

In April 1853 the president of the Bank of New South Wales, John Holden, conveyed the property to Benjamin Yabsley, who the following day conveyed it to Charles Mitchell. After Mitchell died the trustees of his estate sold the property to George Alfred Tucker, in March 1874.

=== Ownership by Samuel Gray ===
Three years later Tucker sold the land to Samuel William Gray, who made application to convert the property to Torrens Title in December 1881. Gray (1823–1889) was born in Armagh in Northern Ireland. He and his family arrived in NSW around 1835. His father purchased 520 hectares (1,280 acres), known as "Omega Retreat", between Kiama and Gerringong and became a farmer and grazier. Gray was educated at the Normal Institution in Sydney, following which he went to sea in 1849 and then travelled to Bendigo during the gold rushes. He returned to Kiama and settled into life as a farmer and grazier at Bendella. Gray leased 1,600 hectares (3,950 acres) in the Camden District in 1860 and in the early 1860s took up land on the Tweed River. He later returned to family properties near Kiama. He became a Member of the Legislative Assembly in June 1859, initially representing Kiama and subsequently Illawarra and Richmond. Gray acquired business interests in Sydney and lived there until his death.

=== Various owners, 1890s to 1950 ===
After Gray died the land passed to his widow Mary, police magistrate Joshua Bray of Murwillumbah and Edmund Caswell Bowyer Smyth, engineer of Albury. It was bounded by a foreshore reservation, which, was subsequently granted to Mrs Gray, Bray and Edmund Caswell Bowyer-Smyth on 17 May 1894. The land was then assigned to Augustus Morris and Charles King in October 1894, who later that month transferred its title to the City Bank of Sydney. On 18 August 1911 the title to 3 roods 7 perches of the land was transferred to master plumber William Henry Watson of St Peters, who in turn transferred it to plumber Francis Watson of Blakehurst on 28 October 1919. Francis Watson sold the land to Percy Allan, licensee of the Pymble Hotel, during the first quarter of 1929. Allan subdivided it into three allotments and offered it for sale at the beginning of the 1940s. The first sale was to Marrickville bricklayer Thomas Tyson Dixon and his wife Ellen. Transfer of title took place on 26 May 1941. The Dixons sold the land to Ryde electrician John McBride in February 1944. McBride then sold it to master mariner William Obide Lewis Wilding and his wife Agnes, who lived in Hurstville, in July 1946. They, in turn, sold the land to master tanner James Thomas Dale of Maroubra in May 1949; he sold it to Bankstown company director Herbert George Palmer in July 1950. Palmer sold the land to David and Marjorie Thurlow with the transfer of title taking place on 17 September 1951.

== Design of Thurlow House ==
David and Marjorie Thurlow engaged Harry Seidler to design their new home on the land.

=== Design concepts ===
Design and documentation for the Thurlow's new house was well underway by September 1951. It was prepared by Frank D'Arcy and Don Gazzard. Structural engineer Peter Miller was also involved on the project. As with a number of early houses by Seidler, the Thurlow house was evidently built to a tight budget and the Thurlows organised construction of the house themselves.

The concept behind the house was described on a sketch drawing describing the rear of the building. Issues of privacy were taken into account, as was the primacy of the view over the Georges River. The optimal location on the site, however, was only 12.5 metres (41 ft) wide - "enough for living-dining + kitchen." In this part of the site it was not considered desirable to expose rooms to the street or to the east and west because of privacy and "sunprotection" respectively. A two-storey house was considered both dull and wasteful "with 9'-0" minimum ceilings."

Instead, "Low level mezzanine solution gives all rooms a view and also produces a covered terrace as well as interesting flowing interior vertical space. Sun enters higher living space thru sunprotection [sic] louvres on North toward sun court." Placing the carport on the northern side of the house was an "obvious location" for the structure.

== Description ==
Thurlow House consists of a split level dwelling and a detached garage, which are linked by a short covered concrete bridge. The garage is to the north of the house facing Stuart Crescent, while the house is oriented towards a view overlooking the Cooks River to the south. Eastern and western sides of the house are blank, providing protection from the sun and privacy from adjoining properties.

The house is entered at mid-level; its plan is more or less bisected by an open tread stair with tubular steel handrails, one flight leading down to living areas, the other leading up to sleeping accommodation. The lower level contains a living room with a robust stone fireplace. It is separated from the dining area by the fireplace, along with the stair and entry landing. Beyond the dining room is a narrow kitchen and laundry, which opens onto a drying court between the house and the garage. The living and dining areas access a wide deck overlooking the view; a lavatory, aligned with the stair, intrudes into the deck space.

The sleeping level above contains two bedrooms, a study and bathroom. This level extends from the southern end of the lower level spaces and cantilevers over the deck. The internal spaces are unified by the raked ceiling that falls from the southern side of the bedrooms to the north side of living areas. Storage space is located to the north of the main bedroom.

Thurlow House was described in Seidler's first promotional book, Houses, Interiors and Projects, which was published in 1954. It remains relevant because of the high level of integrity that the house has retained:

"The water frontage site overlooking the George's River to the South, resulted in all rooms of the house looking out in that direction. The two levels are staggered to result in space relationships between them inside, with the upper bedroom level forming the roof over the continuous view side terrace of the living floor. The slope of the site placed the double carport on a higher level on the street side and led the suspended approach bridge to an intermediate entrance level. Short flights of steps lead from it down to the living areas and up to the bedrooms.

Complete glass walls on the south bring the view into every part of the house. Ample glazing on the North to admit winter warmth is protected against the summer sun by horizontal fixed louvres. Sandblasted obscure glass is used on this side for privacy, except for a clear glass vision strip at eye level.

The house is built on a continuous rock shelf. The south end of the structure reaches out over the edge of the rock and is therefore cantilevered to avoid foundations on the steeply sloping ground below the rock. The construction is of random rubble masonry and brick walls, steel beams, timber floors and light frame walls for the cantilevered upper level. The interior finishes expose all these materials, with the timber-framed walls lined with T & G Tallow wood boarding, natural finished.

... Colours and textures are warm throughout: Natural timber, sandstone, yellow and brown materials ... the freely spanning flights of the stair ... Stringers are out of 12" x 2" [timber] painted."

The structure of the house consists of 280-millimetre (11 in) brick/stone cavity walls, steel columns and beams, timber-framed floors and roof. External walls are constructed out of randomly coursed sandstone and pale "Chromatex" bricks manufactured by Punchbowl Brick and Pipe Co. while internal walls are constructed out of timber stud framing. Floors are constructed with oregon joists fixed to lugs welded onto steel beams. Floors and internal walls are lined with tongue and groove tallow wood boards. The roof was originally lined with 4-ply asbestos felt (a commonly used building material at this time) with white marble chip protective finish, insulated with aluminium sarking and Insulwool batts and flashed with copper. It has since been replaced by metal decking. Windows are framed in steel.

Internal lighting was quite advanced for the period and still remains in place – recessed ceiling mounted down lights and fluorescent tubes in the kitchen, above the east wall of the living room and dining rooms. Fluorescent tubes are also located in a recess behind the built-in cabinet mounted on the north wall of the living room. Supplementary wall mounted fixtures augment the main lighting. The kitchen was originally comprehensively detailed and equipped to a standard above most houses of the period. Much of this remains, such as an exhaust fan, cupboard and servery joinery and fitments. The kitchen is linked to the main bedroom by a dumb waiter.

=== Condition ===
As of 22 February 2016, the house was in relatively good condition, although in need of some maintenance. The landscape setting is overgrown and weed-infested.

The house has retained a high level of integrity and has retained a substantial amount of original building fabric, fitments and joinery items in living areas, bedrooms and kitchen/laundry

=== Modifications and dates ===
Modifications have been limited in extent. The original roofing has been replaced with metal decking, possibly as a result of the deterioration of the original roofing materials and possible water ingress. The openings to the carport have been enclosed to form a garage, chains to convey roof rainwater have been installed on the northern side of the house, new floor linings have been installed above original kitchen floor linings, some appliances have been removed or replaced in the kitchen and some bathroom fittings have been replaced.

== Heritage listing ==
Thurlow House is of state heritage significance because it is a fine and rare example of an exceptionally intact early Modern Movement house, designed by influential and internationally significant architect Harry Seidler. It is representative of the early houses of Harry Seidler and demonstrates his design philosophy, methodology, exploitation of structure and use of building materials. The house is important in Seidler's body of work because of its inventive split level configuration and architectural form resulting from the constraints of the site and its view potential. The resulting house displays sophisticated spatial relationships and functional planning.

Thurlow House incorporates progressive domestic construction and planning, demonstrated by the use of steel to cantilever sections of the building and the open planning that integrates living and bedroom areas. The house also provides evidence of advanced residential technology from the first half of the 1950s, demonstrated by elements such as indirect lighting using concealed fluorescent tubes and the integration of music equipment in built-in joinery in the living room. Its significance is enhanced by its high levels of physical integrity.

The garden and grounds are an important component of the setting. They include remnant indigenous vegetation, which was intentionally retained during the construction of the house and which was rare for development in the early 1950s. The landscape setting, demonstrates Harry Seidler's philosophy that the settings for his houses be naturalistic. The retention of the single sculptural eucalypt in the front yard is characteristic of an aesthetic employed by Seidler and other Modern Movement architects. Views from the house over the treetops to the Georges River are significant as an essential element of the design of the house in its landscape setting.

Thurlow House was listed on the New South Wales State Heritage Register on 21 October 2016 having satisfied the following criteria.

The place is important in demonstrating the course, or pattern, of cultural or natural history in New South Wales.

Thurlow House is of state significance as an early house design by architect Harry Seidler, who produced an important body of work in NSW, other parts of Australia and internationally. Seidler's architecture is notable for its consistent and rigorous application of Modern Movement principles.

Thurlow House reflects the impact of Seidler's seminal and early Rose Seidler House on sections of the wider community. Members of the professions amongst others were attracted to Seidler's work because of its design characteristics and because of publicity generated by the architect, in part because of his significant battles with local government over advanced architectural design and aesthetics. It is a remarkably intact house that has undergone little change since it was completed in 1954, and provides evidence of the dissemination of advanced Modern Movement architectural design in NSW after World War II.

The garden and grounds of Thurlow House include remnant indigenous vegetation, which was intentionally retained during the construction of the house and demonstrates Seidler's preferred philosophy that the setting for his houses should be minimal in a horticultural sense. This was uncommon for development in the early 1950s.

The place has a strong or special association with a person, or group of persons, of importance of cultural or natural history of New South Wales's history.

Thurlow House is of state significance for its association with internationally significant architect Harry Seidler and it is a fine example of Seidler's modernist design methodology. Seidler was the only architect working in NSW who had trained and worked under influential architects associated with the Bauhaus and brought a thorough understanding of European modernist methodology and aesthetics to NSW.

The house is important in Seidler's body of work because of its particular split level configuration, whereby entry to the house is at mid-level and bedrooms are located on what equates to a mezzanine above living areas. The cantilevering of the bedrooms over the deck of the living areas is also a unique response to the constraints imposed by the site and its available views.

The Thurlows are representative of the young professional social class who commissioned Seidler, demonstrating awareness of, and positive response to, advanced architectural design within sections of the general community.

The place is important in demonstrating aesthetic characteristics and/or a high degree of creative or technical achievement in New South Wales.

Thurlow House is of state significance as a finely designed and well-executed example of Modernist residential architecture. It is one of the finest and most intact houses that survives from the first half of the 1950s in NSW. The house demonstrates advanced planning and split level configuration, and demonstrates convincingly and well the characteristics of the Modern Movement residential architecture. The aesthetic value of the house is due in part to the exploitation of its structural system to provide dramatic spatial qualities and architectural form. It also provides evidence of advanced residential technology and amenity from this period, such as fluorescent and other lighting, kitchen design and surviving joinery, built in joinery items including the cabinet in the living room, which accommodated stereo equipment, and early passive sun control devices.

The materials used in the house-stone, timber, brick, steel-framed windows-the built-in joinery and detailing are a consistent part of Seidler's architectural repertoire at this time and demonstrate his skill in exploiting their intrinsic textural qualities and colouring.

The landscape setting, despite inadequate maintenance, demonstrates architect Harry Seidler's philosophy that the settings for his houses be naturalistic. Views from the house over the treetops to the Georges River are significant as an essential element of the design of the house in its landscape setting.

The place possesses uncommon, rare or endangered aspects of the cultural or natural history of New South Wales.

Thurlow House is of state significance as a rare example of a highly intact post-World War II Modern Movement house in NSW, which demonstrates advanced domestic construction and planning techniques.

Although a relatively large number of Seidler's early houses have survived, many are known to have been subjected to alterations and additions which in some cases have obscured their early design and character. Thurlow House is rare at a state level as an intact example of the early architectural work of Harry Seidler.

The place is important in demonstrating the principal characteristics of a class of cultural or natural places/environments in New South Wales.

Thurlow House is of state significance as a fine, representative example of post-World War II Modern Movement domestic architecture in NSW.

The house is representative of the early domestic architecture of Harry Seidler. It demonstrates many of the characteristics of his residential design, including planning and organisation of spaces over several levels to exploit views and provide amenity for the occupants; built-in joinery units and general standard of detailing; and exploitation of structure to achieve open planning and spatial complexity. The representative qualities of the house are enhanced by its high levels of physical integrity.

The landscape setting demonstrates Harry Seidler's philosophy that the settings for his houses be naturalistic. The single sculptural eucalypt in the front yard is representative of a landscaping aesthetic preferred by Seidler and other Modern Movement architects.

== See also ==
- Australian residential architectural styles
