= 1959 Cook's River state by-election =

Election result for Cook's River, New South Wales, Australia

A by-election was held for the New South Wales Legislative Assembly seat of Cook's River on Saturday, 12 December 1959 and was triggered by the death in office of the Premier of New South Wales, Joseph Cahill (Labor).

The seat was subsequently retained for the Labor Party by his eldest son Tom. Despite Cook's River being a safe Labor seat, the Liberal Party fielded a candidate, John Bampton, a soap manufacturer. The Labor primary vote improved by 1.6% compared to the previous year's general election. The Communist Party of Australia stood Wal Buckley, an organiser for the Amalgamated Engineering Union, but only gained 4.6% of the vote.

== Results ==
1959 Cook's River by-election Saturday 12 December
Party	Candidate	Votes	%	±%
Labor	Tom Cahill	14,283	72.55	+1.61
Liberal	John Bampton	4,488	22.80	−1.45
Communist	Walter Buckley	916	4.65	+4.65
Total formal votes		19,687		
Informal votes		364	1.82	
Turnout		20,051	84.48	
Labor hold		Swing	+1.61	

The Labor Party retained the seat on an improved margin, which was nonetheless significant due to the large personal vote for Cahill and sympathy after his death which was then carried by his son.

== See also ==
- Electoral results for the district of Cook's River
- List of New South Wales state by-elections
