= Voltaire Molesworth =

Australian politician (1889–1934)

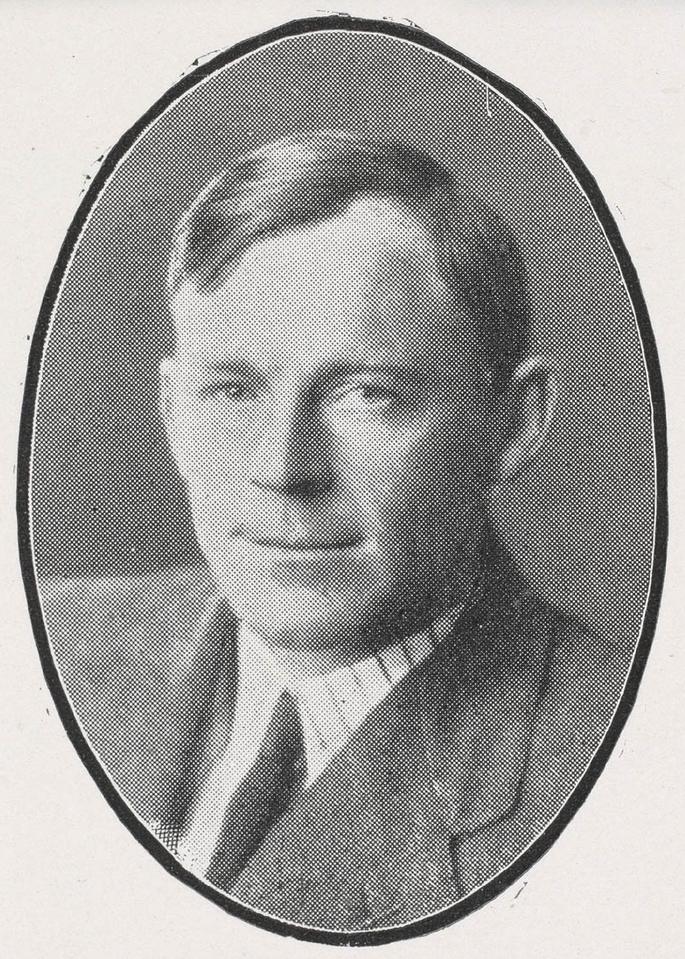
- Molesworth c. 1930

Member of the New South Wales Legislative Council
- In office September 8th 1932 – 22 April 1934

Member of the New South Wales Legislative Assembly
- In office 20 March 1920 – 18 April 1925
- Constituency: Cumberland

Personal details
- Born: 29 December 1889 Balmain, New South Wales, Australia
- Died: 5 November 1934 (aged 44) Sydney, New South Wales, Australia
- Party: Labor (to 1925); Nationalist Party (1925–1931); United Australia (from 1931)
- Spouse: Ivy Vick (m. 1915)
- Occupation: Journalist

Voltaire Molesworth (29 December 1889 – 5 November 1934) was an Australian journalist, newspaper editor and politician.

Molesworth was born in Sydney, spending part of his early childhood in Paraguay as part of the utopian socialist New Australia colony. He began his journalism career with the Cumberland Times and The Evening News, serving a term as state president of the Australian Journalists Association. Molesworth was best known for his association with Smith's Weekly and its affiliate the Daily Guardian, including as editor of the latter from 1927 to 1931.

Molesworth combined journalism with parliamentary politics. Initially a member of the Australian Labor Party (ALP), he was an unsuccessful candidate at the 1914 federal election before winning a seat in the New South Wales Legislative Assembly at the 1920 state election. He soon came into conflict with party leader Jack Lang and in 1925 he left the Labor Party and later joined the Nationalist Party. He was appointed to the New South Wales Legislative Council in 1932 as a member of the United Australia Party and served until 1934.

== Early life ==
Molesworth was born on 29 December 1889 in Balmain, New South Wales. He was the second surviving son of Elizabeth Ellen (née Vibert) and James Molesworth. His father was born in Hobart and went to sea at an early age, later settling in Sydney where he worked as a stevedore until losing his job after the 1890 maritime strike. He then worked as a hawker.

When Molesworth was three, his parents joined the utopian socialist New Australia colony in Paraguay founded by William Lane, taking their infant son with them. The family soon joined around 80 others in “seceding” from the colony, ultimately returning to Australia after only eight months. His father, a wharf labourer by profession, later wrote an account of the colony, and donated over 400 of his papers to researcher John Alexander Ferguson. Molesworth maintained an interest in New Australia and its aftermath, in 1926 publishing an article in Smith’s Weekly on León Cadogan’s desire to return to Australia. referencing “William Lane’s madness”.

After returning to Australia, Molesworth received his primary school education in Sydney before leaving school to work as a warehouse clerk.

== Journalism career ==
In 1912, Molesworth joined the staff of the Cumberland Times. He joined The Evening News in 1914 and wrote on industrial matters. He attempted to enlist in the Australian Imperial Force during World War I, but was rejected for health reasons several times. Molesworth held office in the Australian Journalists Association, serving as honorary auditor where he uncovered discrepancies in membership subscriptions. He was subsequently elected treasurer and then state president in 1919. In the same year he became chief of staff of Smith's Weekly.

In 1923, Molesworth was appointed as the inaugural editor of the Daily Guardian, a new publication of Smith's Newspapers Limited. He was dismissed in 1929, but reinstated the following year after Smith's Newspapers Ltd was taken over by R. C. Packer's Associated Newspapers Ltd. He continued as managing editor until 1931 when he sacked again and received a substantial settlement.

After his conflict with Lang, Molesworth increasingly used the Daily Guardian to "smear Lang's name and portray him as a dictator", an opinion shared by Clyde Packer. He was responsible for the paper's greater focus on politics spanning from the local government level to the federal level. By 1926 he was chief-of-staff under Adam McCay as editor.

In mid-1927, following a falling out between Claude McKay and Adam McCay, the partnership behind Smith's Newspapers Ltd collapsed, with Packer and his son Frank emerging with a half-share in the Victorian Publishing Company Ltd as the new proprietor of Smith’s Weekly. Packer effectively had complete editorial and administrative control of the company. Molesworth was appointed editor of the Daily Guardian after the restructure. He continued in the position after the paper was acquired by Associated Newspapers, although F. W. Tonkin was appointed editor-in-chief of the Daily Guardian and Sunday Guardian. The change of ownership saw the paper's circulation drop to 75,000.

Molesworth was sacked in 1931 after damaging a table belonging to Tonkin during a drinking bout with colleagues. Later in 1931, Molesworth rejoined forces with Packer, taking up a 5 percent stake in Sporting Life Publications Ltd which had been established to publish Turf Life, a twice weekly horse racing newspaper originally owned by Thomas G. Hopkins. The company launched an unsuccessful Queensland edition of Turf Life in 1932. In October 1933, following disagreements over the running of the paper, Molesworth agreed to buy out Packer’s stake for £4,500 (equivalent to $510,000 in 2022), to be paid in instalments over a 12-month period. Packer continued to interfere in Molesworth's running of the business, and they dramatically fell out in January 1934. Molesworth died a few months later and Packer had to leave for England suddenly.

== Politics ==
Molesworth began his political career in the Australian Labor Party (ALP), serving as secretary of the party’s Homebush branch. In 1913 he was elected as a branch delegate to the divisional council for the federal seat of Nepean, where he first came into contact with future party leader Jack Lang. He was the party’s candidate in Nepean at the 1914 federal election, losing narrowly to the incumbent Liberal MP Richard Orchard.

During World War I, Molesworth was considered a "moderate" in the ALP, campaigning against conscription but not opposing the war. He was a member of the Industrial Vigilance Council, a faction of the ALP.

Outside of his newspaper activities, Molesworth served as campaign manager for Thomas Mutch's attempt to replace Lang as ALP leader in 1924, with the backing of the Australian Workers' Union (AWU). Lang survived by a single vote, with he and Molesworth becoming enemies. In 1925, Molesworth told Smith's Weekly that "Labour in New South Wales is torn with straife, intrigue and political corruption […] one cannot be loyal to the labour movement and be loyal to Mr Lang".

In September 1932, Molesworth was appointed to the New South Wales Legislative Council where he sat as a member of the United Australia Party (UAP). Initially a lifetime appointment, his term ended in April 1934 following the passage of a constitutional amendment reforming the council.

== Personal life ==
Molesworth married Ivy Vick in 1915, with whom he had one son and two daughters. His son Voltaire Molesworth Jr. was a pioneering science fiction author.

Molesworth was an "omnivorous reader" and also collected stamps and coins. He and his family settled in Burwood in 1920, moving to Randwick in 1925 and then to Vaucluse in 1932.

Molesworth died in Sydney on 5 November 1934, aged 44. His death was attributed to mitral stenosis.

== Sources ==
- Griffen-Foley, Bridget (2000). Sir Frank Packer: The Young Master. Harper Collins. ISBN 0-7322-6422-7.

New South Wales Legislative Assembly
New seat	Member for Cumberland; 1920–1925; Served alongside: Carr/FitzSimons, Walker	Succeeded by James McGirr
