= Parramatta Chronicle and Cumberland General Advertiser =

Former Sydney newspaper

Front page of the Parramatta Chronicle and Cumberland General Advertiser, 30 December 1843

The Parramatta Chronicle and Cumberland General Advertiser was an English language newspaper published in Parramatta, New South Wales, Australia.

== Newspaper history ==
The Parramatta Chronicle and Cumberland General Advertiser was first published on 30 December 1843 by local printer Edmund Mason. In the first editorial on page 1 of 30 December, the purpose of the paper was outlined as the "...promotion and protection of the trading, agricultural, and pastoral interests of the district...". The editors promised to "zealously" labour for the advancement of "...the town and district of Parramatta to that important eminence her wealth, population, and resources entitle her to".

The Chronicle was later sold by Mason to B.E. Bailey in September 1845 and from 4 October 1845 it appeared as The Cumberland Times and Western Advertiser, which ceased publication in 1911.

== Digitisation ==
The Parramatta Chronicle and Cumberland General Advertiser has been digitised as part of the Australian Newspapers Digitisation Program by the National Library of Australia.

== See also ==
- List of newspapers in New South Wales
- List of newspapers in Australia
