= 1917 Australian general strike =

1917 Australian General Strike
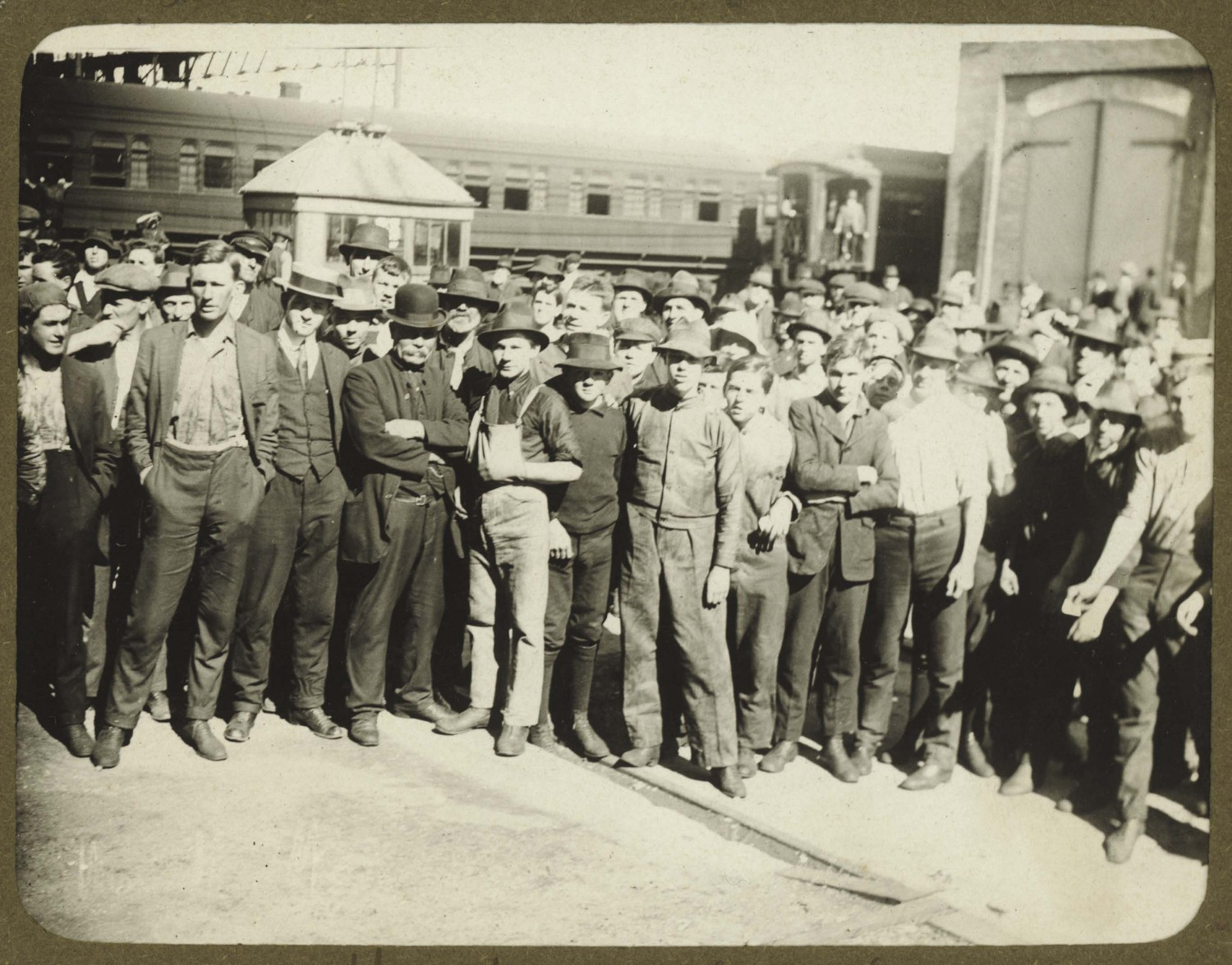
- Railway staff waiting for dinner during the 1917 strike
- Date: 2 August 1917 – 8 September 1917
- Location: Australia
- Caused by: Introduction of a new labour costing system by the New South Wales Department of Railways and Tramways; Slow wage growth; Class tension

Parties
Labor Council of New South Wales; Victorian Trades Hall Council	New South Wales Government; Victorian Government; Australian Government

Lead figures
E. J. Kavanagh; Charles Gray; Adela Pankhurst	William Holman; Alexander Peacock; Billy Hughes; John Fitzpatrick

Usually referred to as the "New South Wales General Strike", but referred to by contemporaries as "the Great Strike", it was in fact neither general nor confined to NSW. The strike was however a mass strike, involving around 100,000 workers, mostly in NSW and Victoria. It began in the Australian state of New South Wales and spread to other states over six weeks from 2 August to 8 September 1917 when the official leadership declared the strike over. It took two weeks for all the railway strikers to return, however, as rank and file meetings initially rejected the official capitulation. Outside the railways, significant groups such as the waterside workers in Sydney and Melbourne, and the Hunter Valley coal mines remained out until November (or December in the case of the Melbourne waterfront) as in their case the use of strikebreakers had turned the strike into a lockout.

== Background ==
The trigger for the strike was the introduction of a new labour costing system introduced by the New South Wales Department of Railways and Tramways. The system, a time and motion study, used cards to record the tasks each worker was assigned and the time it took them to complete those tasks. Concern existed over the right to view or modify their card, and the potential use of the card system to identify (and presumably dismiss) "slow" or "inefficient" workers. The strike began at the Randwick Workshops and Eveleigh Carriage Shops with workers walking off the job in protest. Their cause was taken up throughout the New South Wales railway system, and eventually spread to other industries and states.

Class tensions had been building during the war, however, and it is necessary to look outside the railways to explain the extraordinary spread of the dispute. The Piddington Royal Commission reported in 1920 that real wages in Australia fell by approximately 30% between 1914 and 1919. The response to this was a strike wave that began in early 1916. This, combined with anger at the attempt to introduce conscription and the disaffection of Irish-Australians (a considerable portion of the Australian population, concentrated mostly in the working class), provided the atmosphere of class tension in which the strike exploded.

With the exception of the railways, which were officially called out on 6 August, the strikes all began with rank and file walkouts and were only afterwards made official. Even on the railways, significant sections had walked out before 6 August. The strike then spread to the coal mines in NSW, the waterfront and the seamen. Groups of workers would continue to join the strike right up until September on the principle of refusing to work with a delivery of coal or of goods from the waterfront. When the Melbourne waterfront joined the strike on 11 August a similar spread occurred throughout Melbourne. Other significant additions to the ranks of strikers were the Broken Hill mines, the Wonthaggi coal mine in Victoria, sugar refineries, timber workers, meat workers and gas workers in Sydney. When waterside workers in Port Pirie refused to unload a delivery of NSW coal, this threatened the operation of the refinery which provided the majority of the lead used for munitions on the Western Front. The Prime Minister, W.M. Hughes, declared Port Pirie a military zone to ensure its continued operation.

On 30 August 1917, a striker was shot and killed by strikebreaker. A strikebreaker, Alfred Green, was also shot whilst driving a train from Sydney to Wollongong. Two miners were charged but the case against them collapsed when it was revealed at the time of the shooting they were in Sydney.

The strike was accompanied by scenes of mass protest. There were daily demonstrations in Sydney and Melbourne. At one point Adela Pankhurst led a crowd of 20,000 to confront the police outside federal parliament in Melbourne. In Sydney, the daily rallies peaked every Sunday with crowds of up to 150,000.

The government at both state and federal level responded by organising strikebreaking on a mass scale. A feature of this was a large number of middle-class men who were described as "volunteers", particularly from rural areas. University students and the upper forms and masters of private schools in Sydney and Melbourne were also prominent. The strikebreakers were housed at the SCG and at Taronga Zoo in Sydney. Strikebreakers from rural Victoria were sent to the Maitland coal field in the Hunter Valley of NSW where they were set to work in two large pits. In addition to the "volunteers" around a third of the railway service in NSW continued working, enabling a skeleton service to operate. The railways in NSW had significant reserves of coal, but the Victorian railways nearly ran out.

On 9 September 1917 the Defence Committee, an ad hoc committee of trade union officials based in the NSW Trades and Labour Council, declared the strike over on terms which amounted to a complete capitulation. The decision was denounced as a sellout in a series of furious mass meetings and, when it was clear that hundreds would be victimised, many groups of railway workers resumed strike action. But without official support, the strikers drifted back to work and, after two weeks, the railway strike had ended. The miners and waterside workers, the two groups most affected by strikebreakers remained on strike till November, in a vain attempt to remove the scabs. In the case of the Melbourne waterfront, the strike continued until December.

The defeat was a heavy blow for the labour movement and was a major factor in encouraging Billy Hughes, the Prime Minister, to attempt a second conscription referendum in December 1917. The referendum was defeated, however, and the unions had recovered their strength by 1919, with the strikebreakers driven out of the coal mines and the Melbourne waterfront. A massive strike-wave that year was spearheaded by some of the groups of workers that had shared in the defeat of 1917, particularly the Broken Hill miners and the seamen.

== Well-known strikers ==
The State Records Authority of New South Wales holds the personal history cards of two well-known politicians, which record their involvement and participation in the strike:

- Ben Chifley, who would become Prime Minister of Australia in 1945, had worked on the railways since 1903, and was a train driver at the time of the strike. Following his participation and subsequent dismissal, Chifley was rehired as a driver and fireman, but with reduced wages and seniority.
- Joseph Cahill, who would become Premier of New South Wales in 1952, worked at Eveleigh Workshops at the time, and was an active trade unionist. Cahill's card was marked as an "agitator", and he had great difficulty finding regular work after his participation in the strike.

== Gallery ==
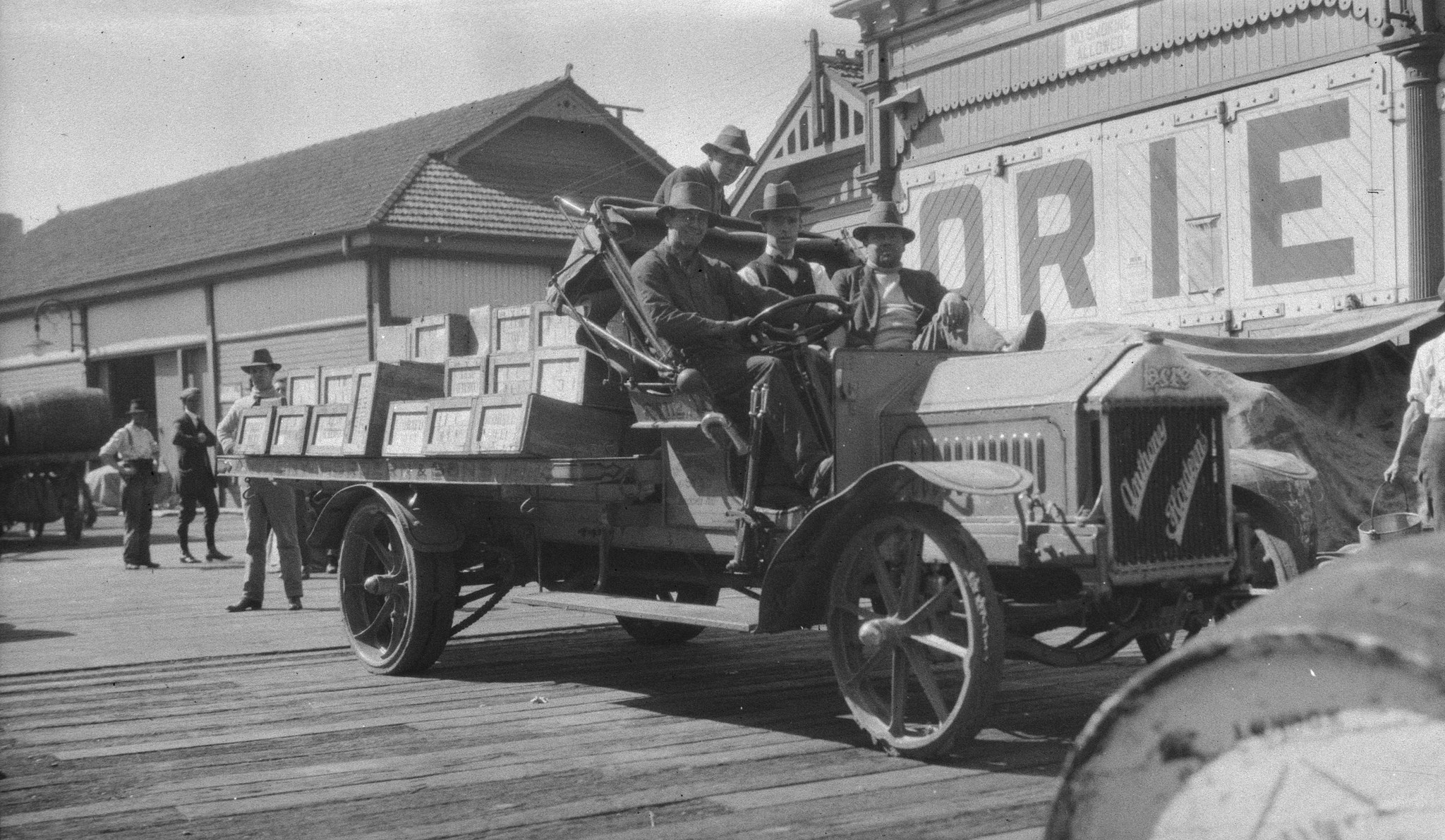
Free labourers during the strike, Sydney, 1917

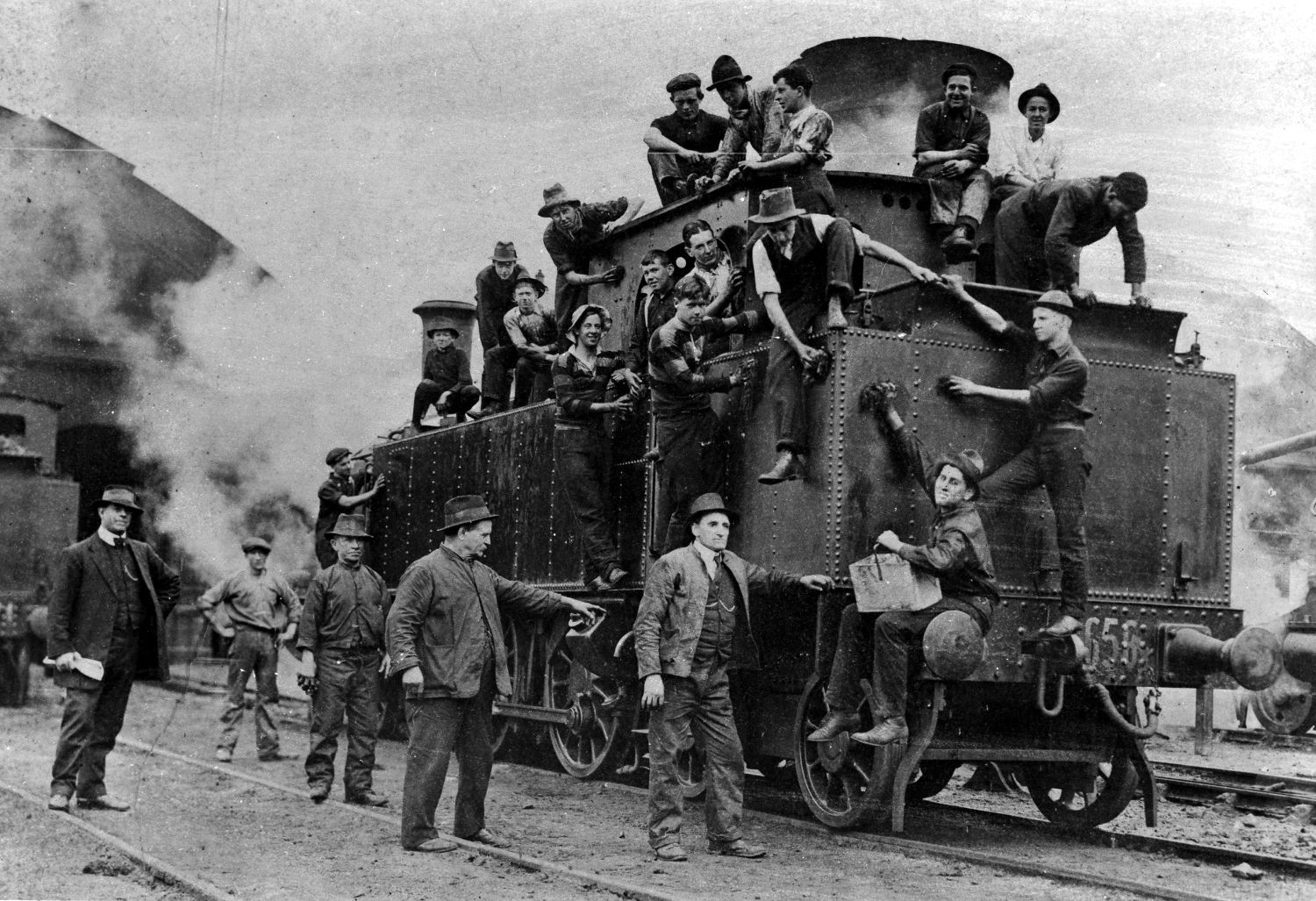
Class C3021 being cleaned by school boys at the Eveleigh Depot during the 1917 strike

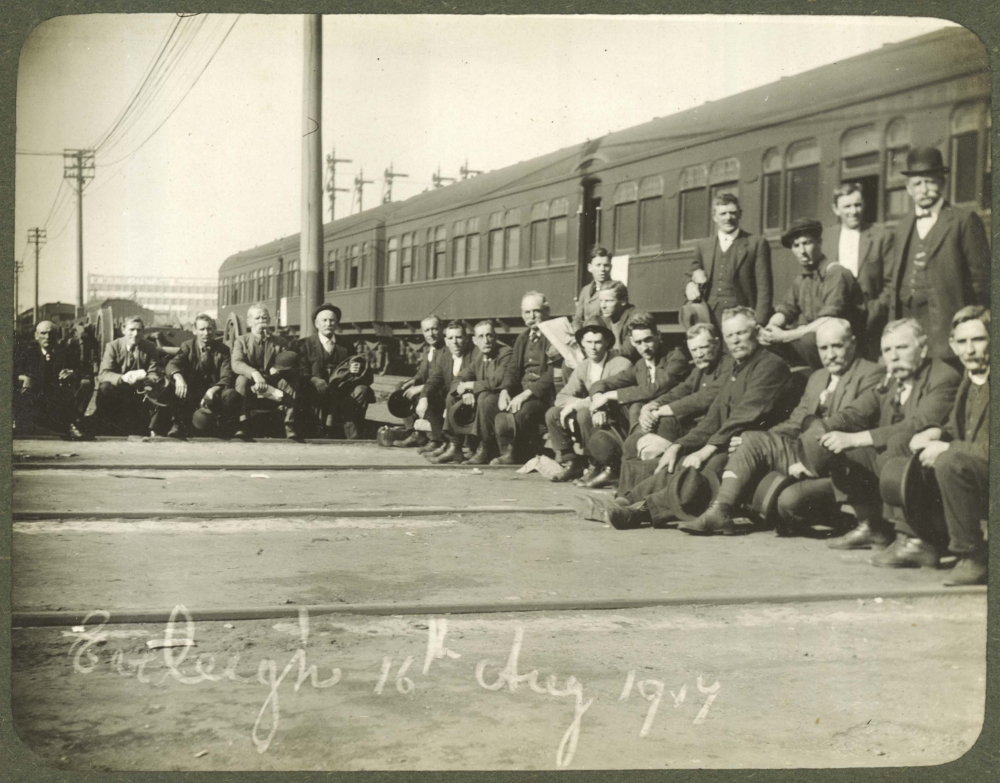
Locomotive drivers during the 1917 strike

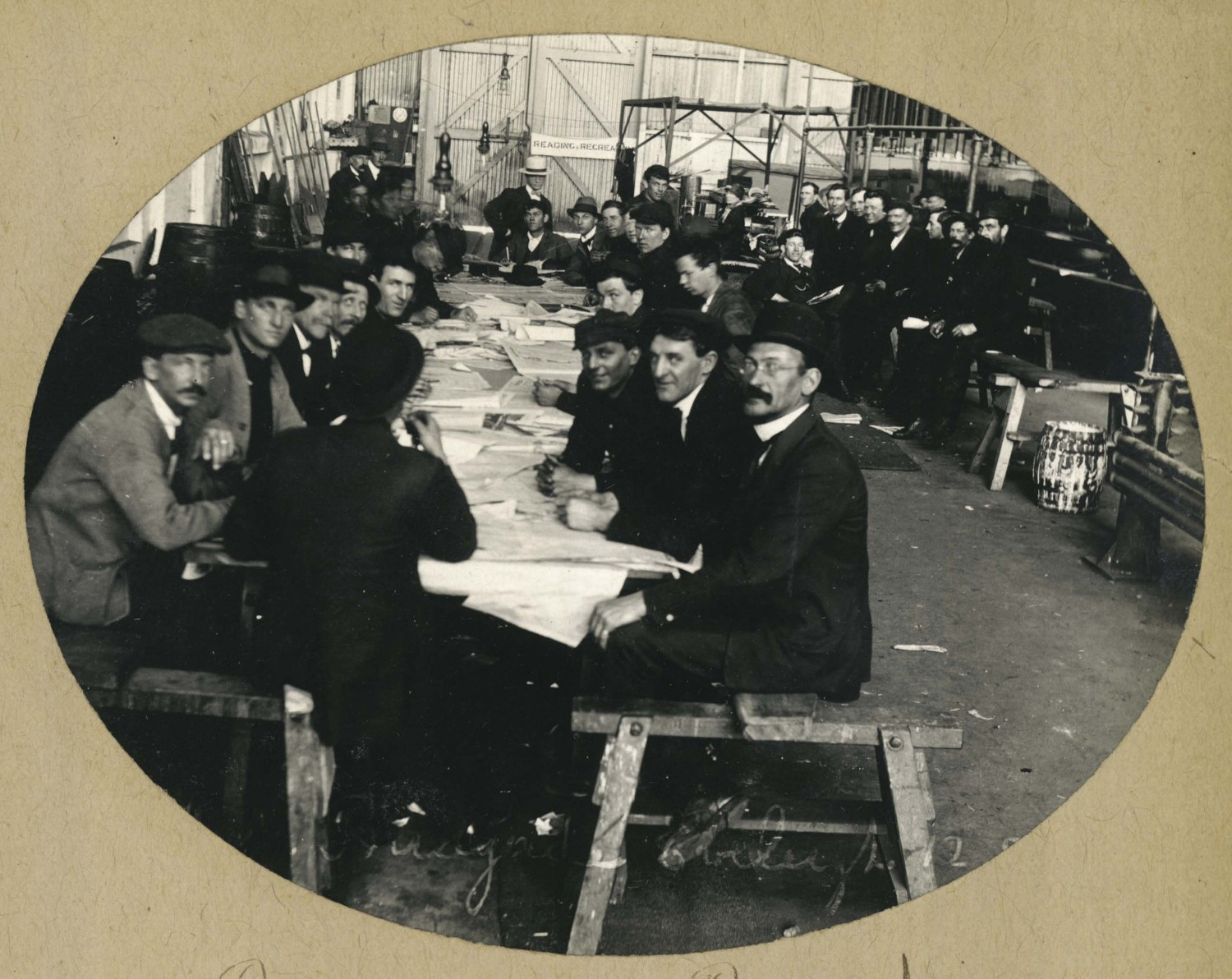
Railway staff enjoying reading and recreation time during the 1917 strike

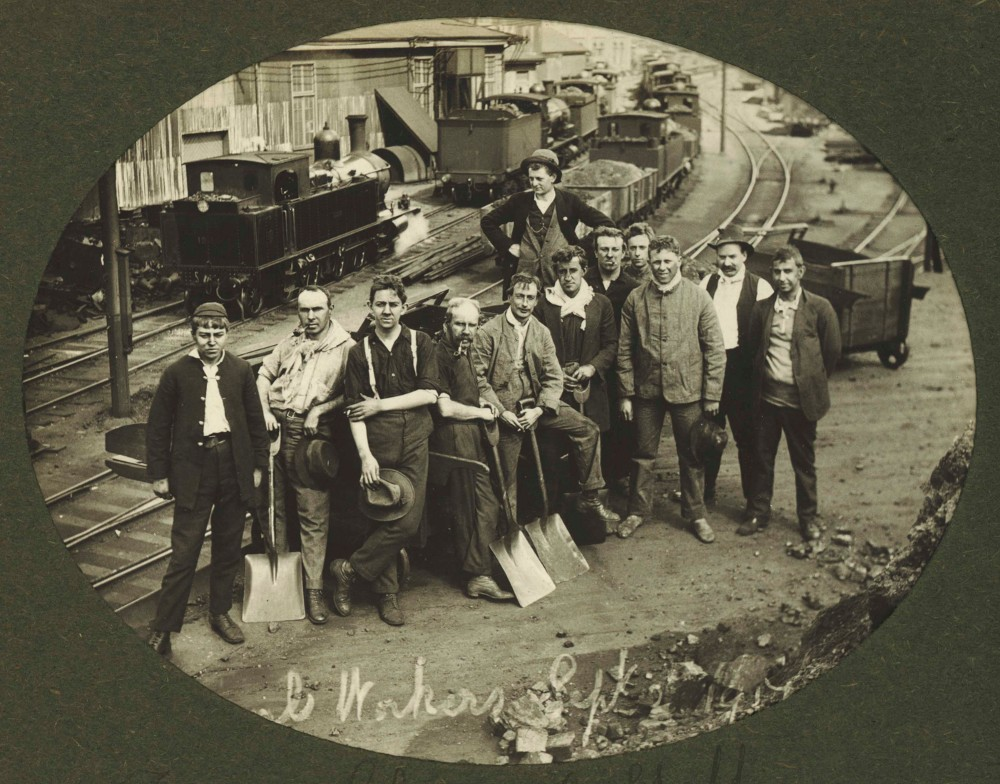
Tramway clerical staff during the 1917 strike

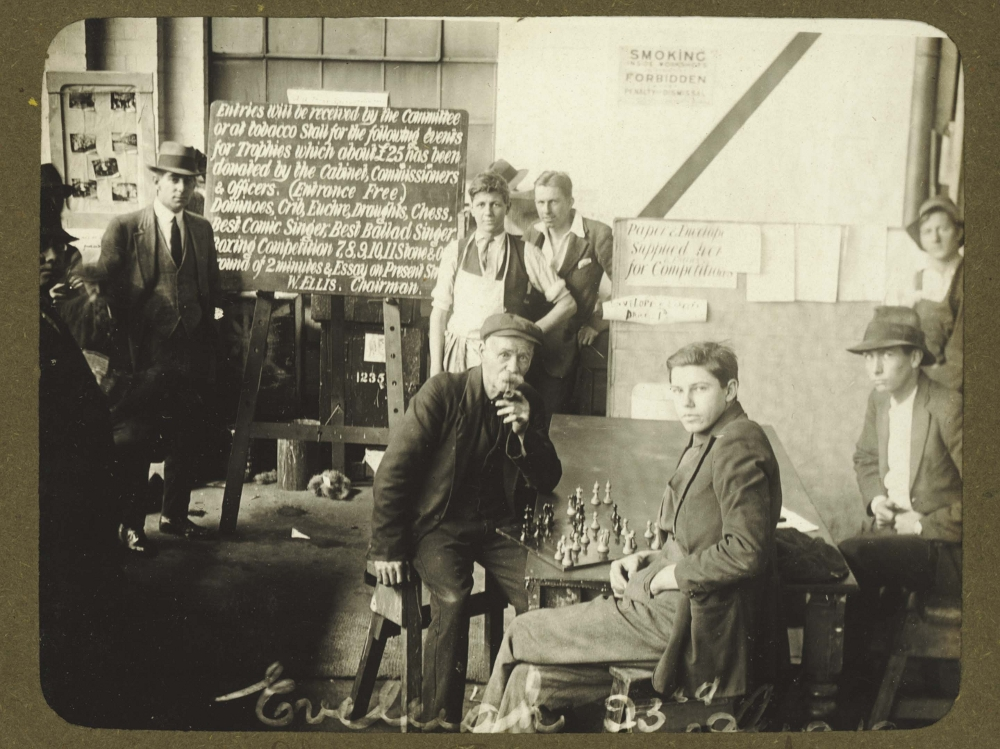
Railway workers enjoying a game of chess during the 1917 strike

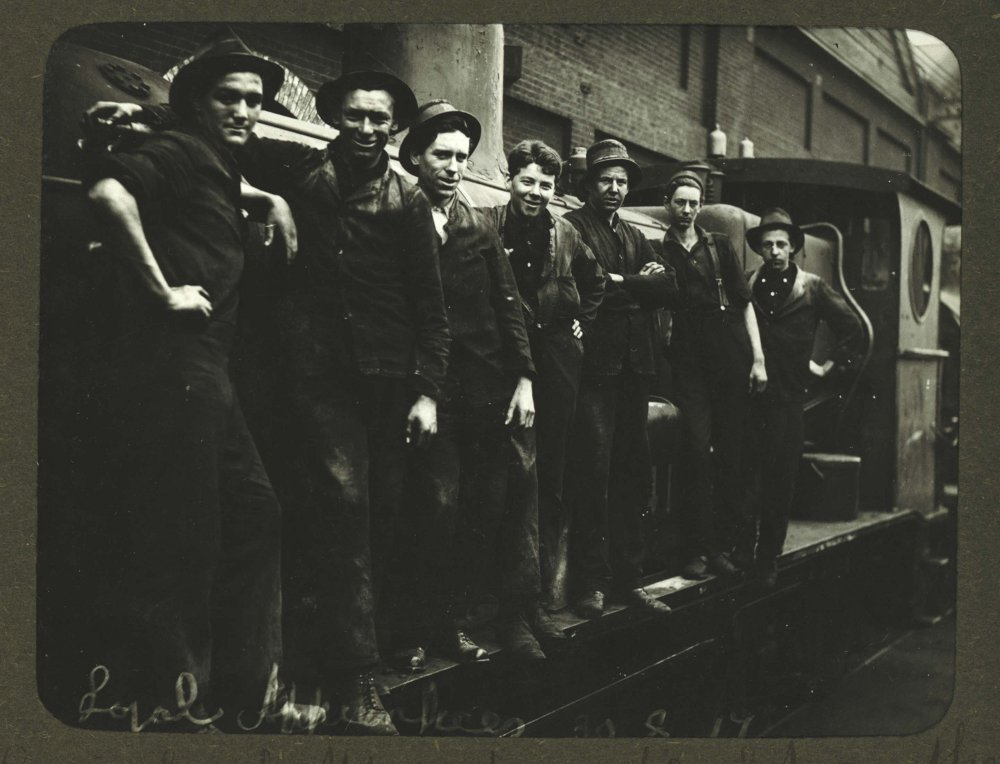
Loyal apprentices on the one pit in the old erecting shop during the 1917 strike

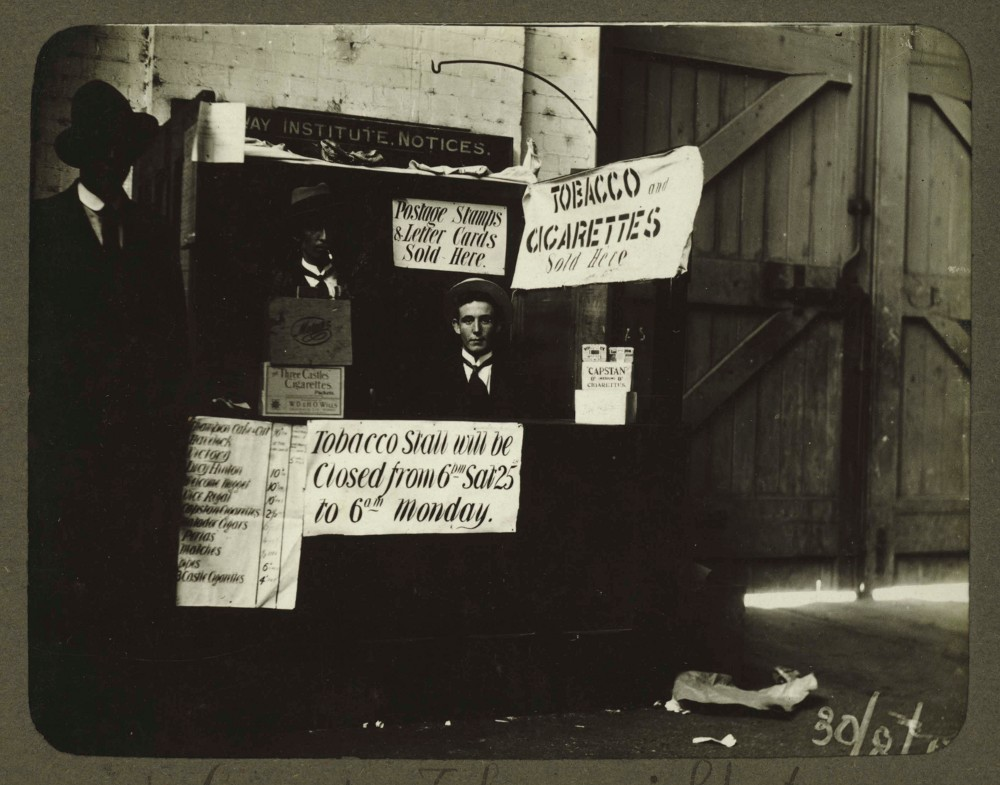
Railway camp tobacco shop during the 1917 strike

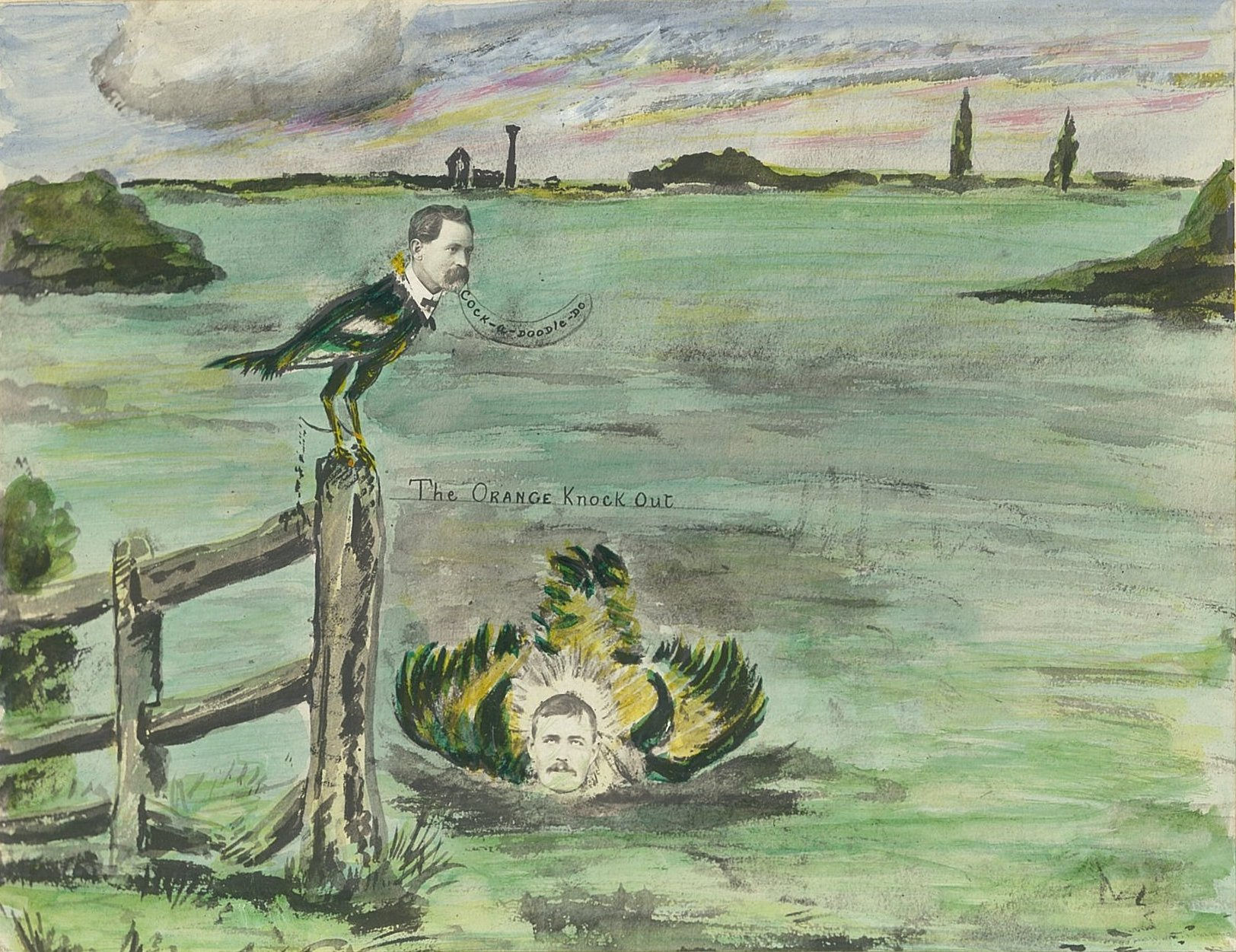
Political cartoon of John C.L. Fitzpatrick, NSW Secretary for Mines and Treasurer, 1917
