= William FitzSimons =

Australian politician

William Robert FitzSimons (26 November 1870 – 20 March 1926) was an Irish-born Australian politician.

He was born at Greencastle in County Donegal to constable Samuel FitzSimons and Isabella, née McCloy. He arrived in New South Wales around 1886 and began studying dentistry. He married Bessie Amy Love, with whom he had two children. He practised as a dentist in Elizabeth and Macquarie Streets from 1905 to 1926, and also served on Kuringai Shire Council from 1911 to 1922 (president 1917–21). In 1922 he was elected to the New South Wales Legislative Assembly as a Nationalist member for Cumberland, serving until his death in Sydney in 1926.

Civic offices
Preceded by James Young	Shire President of Ku-ring-gai; 1917 – 1921	Succeeded by Norman McIntosh
New South Wales Legislative Assembly
Preceded by Ernest Carr	Member for Cumberland; 1922–1926; Served alongside: Molesworth/McGirr, Walker	Succeeded by James Shand
