= Electoral district of Cumberland Boroughs (NSW Legislative Council) =

Former New South Wales Legislative Council electoral district

Cumberland Boroughs New South Wales—Legislative Council
- State: New South Wales
- Created: 1843
- Abolished: 1856
- Namesake: Cumberland County
- Coordinates: 33°55′S 150°55′E

The electoral district of Cumberland Boroughs, also known as the united towns of Windsor, Richmond, Liverpool and Campbelltown, was an electorate of the New South Wales Legislative Council at a time when two thirds (24 members) were elected, one sixth (six members) were official members, that is they held a government office and the balance (six members) were appointed by the governor.

The district was created by the Electoral Act 1843, returning one member. and consisted of the Cumberland County towns, or boroughs, of Richmond, Windsor, Liverpool and Campbelltown, but not the surrounding rural areas, which were in the district of County of Cumberland. The district was unchanged when the Legislative Council was expanded in 1851.

In 1856 the unicameral Legislative Council was abolished and replaced with an elected Legislative Assembly and an appointed Legislative Council. The district was represented by the single member Legislative Assembly electorate of Cumberland Boroughs and William Bowman was re-elected.

== Members for Cumberland Boroughs ==
Member	Party	Period
William Bowman	None	1843–1851
John Holden	None	1851–1853
William Bowman	None	1853–1856

== Election results ==
=== 1843 ===
1843 New South Wales colonial election, 19 June: Cumberland Boroughs
Candidate	Votes	%
William Bowman	127	50.20
Robert Fitzgerald	126	49.80
Total votes	253	100.00

=== 1848 ===
1848 New South Wales colonial election, 1 August: Cumberland Boroughs
Candidate	Votes	%
William Bowman (elected)	165	89
Robert Fitzgerald	20	11
Total votes	185	100

=== 1851 ===
1851 New South Wales colonial election, 20 September: Cumberland Boroughs
Candidate	Votes	%
John Holden	123	55.9
William Bowman	97	44.1
Total votes	220	100

=== 1853 ===
John Holden resigned in March 1853.

County of Cumberland by-election 18 April 1853
Candidate	Votes	%
William Bowman	unopposed	

== See also ==
- Members of the New South Wales Legislative Council, 1843–1851 and 1851-1856
