= Ernest Carr =

Australian politician (1875–1956)

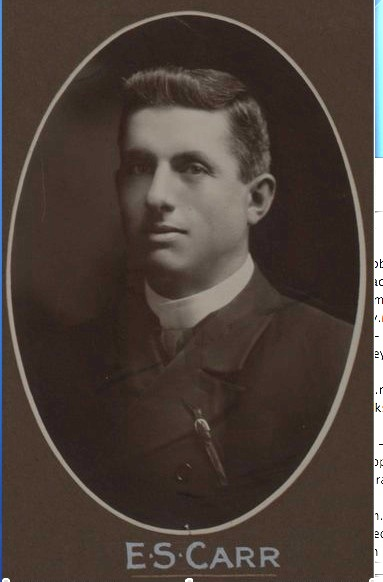

Member of the Australian Parliament for Macquarie
- In office 12 December 1906 – 5 May 1917
- Preceded by: Sydney Smith
- Succeeded by: Samuel Nicholls

Personal details
- Born: 28 September 1875 Dubbo, New South Wales
- Died: 17 September 1956 (aged 80) Parramatta, New South Wales
- Party: Labor (1906–1916); National Labor (1916–1917); Nationalist (1917)
- Occupation: Journalist

Ernest Shoebridge Carr (28 September 1875 – 17 September 1956) was an Australian politician. He was a member of the Australian House of Representatives from 1906 until 1917 for the electorate of Macquarie, representing the Australian Labor Party until the 1916 Labor split and thereafter joining the new Nationalist Party. He was later a Nationalist member of the New South Wales Legislative Assembly from 1920 to 1922, representing the electorate of Cumberland.

== Early life and career ==
Carr was born in Dubbo, New South Wales, the son of a soap manufacturer. He was educated at state schools until the age of 14, when he left school to work in his father's factory. He took over a Dubbo real estate agency at the age of 19 but sold out two years later and entered into partnership as a building contractor at Bourke, with the Bourke Lands Office and Wentworth Post Office among Carr's projects. At 23, he then bought the Orange-based newspaper The Leader and converted it from a bi-weekly into a daily. He edited The Leader for seven years, but sold the newspaper after his election to parliament.

== Federal and state politics ==
Carr won Macquarie at the 1906 federal election. He comfortably held his seat over subsequent elections until his expulsion from the ALP over his support for conscription in September 1916 during the 1916 Labor split. In February 1917, along with the other former Labor MPs expelled during the split, Carr joined the newly formed pro-conscription Nationalist Party of Australia. In one of the closest polling results in Australian electoral history, Carr lost the 1917 election by nine votes.

After the loss of his federal seat, Carr returned to journalism and bought a Hawkesbury based newspaper. He then returned to politics when he successfully stood as the Nationalist candidate for the New South Wales Legislative Assembly electorate of Cumberland in 1920. Carr lost his seat at the 1922 election.

== Post-parliament ==
Carr listed his occupation as "company manager" in the 1920s, when he was recorded as living at Mosman. He was a serial Nationalist preselection candidate for New South Wales-based seats through the 1920s, contesting Cumberland as an independent in 1925 and standing as an endorsed Nationalist at the 1928 and 1929 federal elections. He unsuccessfully sought Nationalist preselection for a final time at the 1930 state election. He was a veteran supporter of the New England New State Movement during the 1920s.

In later years Carr relocated to Parramatta and was again described as a journalist, reportedly associated with Cumberland Newspapers Limited. He was a member of the Granville Chamber of Commerce and in the 1940s was also engaged in tin and copper mining. He was an outspoken proponent of social credit theory in later years, standing as a Social Credit Party candidate at the 1937 federal election, serving as the state secretary of the Social Credit Movement for Australia during the mid-1940s, and writing many letters to the editor on the subject over many years. He was also the state secretary and a key figure in the short-lived One Parliament for Australia party in 1943.

Carr died at Parramatta in 1956 and was cremated at the Northern Suburbs Crematorium. He was survived by his wife, two daughters and two sons.

== Notes ==
Parliament of Australia
| Preceded by Sydney Smith | Member for Macquarie; 1906–1917 | Succeeded by Samuel Nicholls |
New South Wales Legislative Assembly
| Preceded by New seat | Member for Cumberland; 1920–1922; Served alongside: Molesworth, Walker | Succeeded by William FitzSimons |
