= Electoral district of Cumberland (New South Wales) =

State electoral district of New South Wales, Australia

Cumberland was an electoral district of the Legislative Assembly in the Australian state of New South Wales in outer western Sydney named after Cumberland County. It was created as a three-member electorate with the introduction of proportional representation in 1920, replacing Camden and Hawkesbury. It was abolished in 1927 and replaced by Hawkesbury, Nepean, and parts of Bankstown, Lakemba and Hornsby.

== Members for Cumberland ==
Member	Party	Term	Member	Party	Term	Member	Party	Term
Voltaire Molesworth	Labor	1920–1925	Bruce Walker	Nationalist	1920–1927	Ernest Carr	Nationalist	1920–1922
Voltaire Molesworth	Labor	1920–1925	Bruce Walker	Nationalist	1920–1927	William FitzSimons	Nationalist	1922–1926
James McGirr	Labor	1925–1927	Bruce Walker	Nationalist	1920–1927	William FitzSimons	Nationalist	1922–1926
James McGirr	Labor	1925–1927	Bruce Walker	Nationalist	1920–1927	James Shand	Nationalist	1926–1927

== Election results ==
1925 New South Wales state election: Cumberland
Party	Candidate	Votes	%	±%
Quota		7,885		
Nationalist	William FitzSimons (elected 1)	8,959	28.4	+2.6
Nationalist	Bruce Walker Sr (elected 2)	7,989	25.3	+2.3
Nationalist	James Shand	4,010	12.7	+12.7
Labor	James McGirr (elected 3)	7,102	22.5	−3.1
Labor	Robert Bingham	1,621	5.1	+5.1
Progressive	Reginald Harris	826	2.6	+2.6
Progressive	Aaron Morris	121	0.4	+0.4
Progressive	Arthur Upchurch	47	0.2	+0.2
Independent	Ernest Carr	330	1.1	+1.1
Independent	John Allaburton	124	0.4	+0.4
Total formal votes		31,537	97.3	+0.3
Informal votes		882	2.7	−0.3
Turnout		32,419	68.9	−1.1
Party total votes
Nationalist		20,958	66.4	−4.9
Labor		9,131	29.0	+2.9
Progressive		994	3.2	+0.6
Independent	Ernest Carr	330	1.1	+1.1
Independent	John Allaburton	124	0.4	+0.4

== See also ==
From 1856 until 1859 there were three districts covering the area.

- Electoral district of Cumberland Boroughs which covered the towns in the area - Richmond, Windsor, Liverpool and Campbelltown.
- Electoral district of Cumberland (South Riding)
- Electoral district of Cumberland (North Riding)
