= Joseph Cahill =

Australian politician (1891–1959)

The Honourable Joseph Cahill
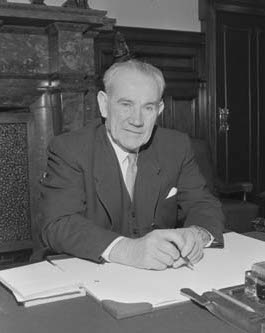

29th Premier of New South Wales
- In office 2 April 1952 – 22 October 1959
- Monarch: Elizabeth II
- Governor: Sir John Northcott; Sir Eric Woodward
- Deputy: Bob Heffron
- Preceded by: James McGirr
- Succeeded by: Bob Heffron

3rd Deputy Premier of New South Wales
- In office 21 September 1949 – 2 April 1952
- Premier: James McGirr
- Preceded by: Jack Baddeley
- Succeeded by: Robert Heffron

Secretary for Public Works
- In office 16 May 1941 – 2 April 1952
- Premier: William McKell; James McGirr
- Preceded by: Lewis Martin
- Succeeded by: Jack Renshaw

Minister for Local Government
- In office 8 June 1944 – 2 April 1952
- Premier: William McKell; James McGirr
- Preceded by: James McGirr
- Succeeded by: Jack Renshaw

Member of the New South Wales Parliament for Cook's River
- In office 10 May 1941 – 22 October 1959
- Preceded by: New district
- Succeeded by: Tom Cahill

Personal details
- Born: 21 January 1891 Redfern, New South Wales
- Died: 22 October 1959 (aged 68) Sydney, New South Wales, Australia
- Resting place: Rookwood Cemetery
- Party: New South Wales Labor Party
- Spouse: Esmey Mary Kelly (m. 1922)
- Children: Thomas James Cahill (1924–1983); John Joseph Cahill (1926–2006); Brian Francis Cahill (1930–2013); Mary (Gemma) Cahill; Margaret Cahill

John Joseph Cahill (Note: Pronounced /ˈkɑːɪl/ KAH-il) (21 January 1891 – 22 October 1959), also known as Joe Cahill or J. J. Cahill, was a long-serving New South Wales politician, railway worker, trade unionist and Labor Party Premier of New South Wales from 1952 to his death in 1959. Born the son of Irish migrants in Redfern, Cahill worked for the New South Wales Government Railways from the age of 16 before joining the Australian Labor Party. Being a prominent unionist organiser, including being dismissed for his role in the 1917 general strike, Cahill was elected to the Parliament of New South Wales for St George in 1925.

After many years of backbench service, including a term outside of parliament, Cahill was appointed Secretary for Public Works in 1941 and Minister for Local Government in the government of William McKell in 1944, where he led significant reforms of local government in the state, including establishing a Royal commission in 1945, and passing the landmark Local Government (Areas) Act of 1948. Promoted to Deputy Premier in 1949, Cahill became Premier of New South Wales from April 1952 to his death in October 1959. His term as premier is primarily remembered for his government's role in post-war infrastructure development, which included the commissioning of the Sydney Opera House and construction of the expressway which now bears his name.

== Early years and family ==
Joe Cahill, as he was popularly known, was born on 21 January 1891 in the inner-Sydney suburb of Redfern, the son of Irish-born parents, Thomas Cahill, and Ellen Glynn. Cahill's father was born in County Limerick and was a NSW railways labourer at the nearby Eveleigh Railway Workshops, and his mother was the daughter of Irish immigrants from County Clare. After being educated at St Brigid's, Marrickville, and Patrician Brothers' School, Redfern, at age 16 he was apprenticed as a fitter for the New South Wales Government Railways at the Eveleigh Railway Workshops on 2 July 1907.

As a member of the Workers' Educational Association and the Marrickville branch of the Amalgamated Society of Engineers (known from 1921 as the Amalgamated Engineering Union [AEU]), Cahill became politically active and joined the NSW Branch of the Labor Party. Like most Roman Catholics within the Labor Party he opposed conscription for World War I in 1916, and lost his railway job on 14 August 1917 after taking part in a general strike over railway workers' pay and conditions.

Cahill also made his first attempt to enter politics as a member of the Parliament of New South Wales, when he stood as the Labor candidate for the Legislative Assembly seat of Dulwich Hill at the March 1917 election. Bearing the marks of a young radical, Cahill campaigned on big ideas like the abolition of the Legislative Council and replacing the state Governor with the Lieutenant-Governor, but his comment that "the wealth of the country should be placed in one big pool" attracted amusement in the press. Cahill was subsequently defeated on a margin of 31-68% against the sitting Nationalist Party member, Tom Hoskins.

On 17 February 1918 his younger brother who also worked in the New South Wales railways, Sapper Thomas James Cahill, of the 4th Field Company (4th Division), Australian Engineers, was killed in action in France. His father had also died in June 1916 at the age of 58 while on active service as a reservist Sergeant-Major in the Australian Garrison Artillery. After a period of difficult unemployment, Cahill found some work selling insurance amongst other temporary jobs, but was re-employed by the New South Wales Government Railways in mid-1922 at the Randwick Tramway Workshops.

On 11 November 1922, at St Brigid's Church, Marrickville, he married Esmey Mary Kelly, the daughter of public servant James Joseph Kelly, and they were to have three sons and two daughters. When their first son was born on 12 February 1924, they named him Thomas James after Cahill's younger brother. On 11 December 1926, another son was born, who they named John Joseph Cahill. A third son, Brian Francis Cahill, was born on 10 December 1930.

In 1922, after taking part in an unsuccessful attempt to unseat the AEU's NSW governing body through a federal council, Cahill among several others was sued by the union for "illegally holding office within the union". Although the suit was later dismissed by the Chief Judge in Equity, Philip Street, Cahill was banned from holding office in the union until 1925.

== Early political career ==
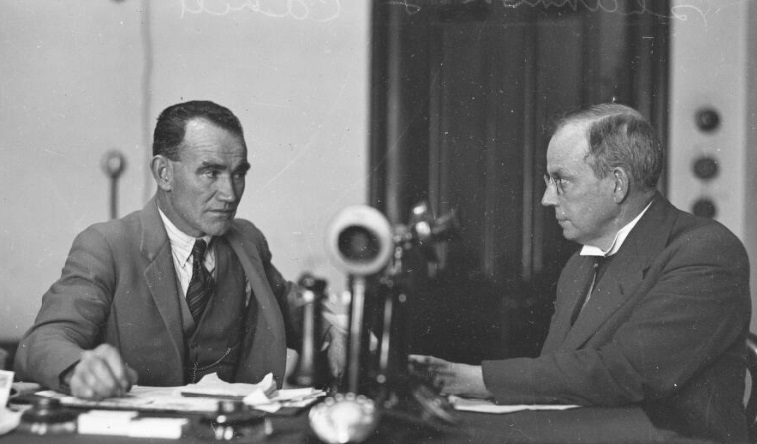
Cahill as Party Whip, with NSW Labor Treasurer, Tom Shannon.

Eight years after his first tilt at state politics, Cahill was elected as one of the members of the NSW Legislative Assembly seat of St George at the 1925 state election, which brought the Labor party back into government under Jack Lang. He was never counted among the close allies of Lang, and remained on the backbench throughout Lang's two terms in government. Cahill, along with half of the parliamentary caucus, supported Peter Loughlin, when the latter challenged Lang for the party leadership in September 1926. With the abolition of the St George constituency in 1930, Cahill ran for Arncliffe and was appointed party whip. However, Cahill lost his bid to be re-elected for Arncliffe to United Australia Party's Horace Harper, at the 1932 election, with the electoral tide sweeping out the dismissed Lang Labor government.

This defeat, nevertheless, proved to be only a temporary setback, and Cahill found work as a shop inspector for a shoe retailer in the interim. Retaining his interest in political matters, Cahill (despite his earlier support of Loughlin) stayed loyal to Lang when many in the ALP had deserted the flamboyant ex-Premier. He exclaimed to an Arncliffe Labor meeting: "Mr. Lang is the greatest friend the workers have ever had, and time will prove that Lang is right." In 1935, Cahill was returned to parliament in Arncliffe for the State Labor Party despite the overall defeat at the election, declaring that while "the Press had poisoned the minds of the people, [...] ten years after he was dead the Press would proclaim Mr. Lang as the greatest hero Australia had seen for many a long day."

With Lang's leadership in doubt after a further election loss in 1938, Cahill abandoned his former praise of Lang, and he backed a caucus motion to support federal intervention in the state branch's factional infighting which had led to several of his colleagues defecting to the Industrial Labor Party, led by Bob Heffron, the member representing Botany in Sydney's south-east. Cahill subsequently supported William McKell, when he successfully challenged Lang for the Labor Party leadership in September 1939, and was elected to the party executive.

A frequent speaker in the assembly, Cahill often addressed his fellow parliamentarians on railway-related matters and lobbied the government (unsuccessfully) for an extension of the Cooks River Tram Line to Arncliffe. Cahill was the Labor Party campaign director for the September 1940 federal election, which resulted in the ALP under John Curtin gaining the popular vote and winning three additional seats from Robert Menzies' United Australia Party Government, which was forced into minority status, and later fell in a confidence vote in October 1941.

== Minister of the Crown ==
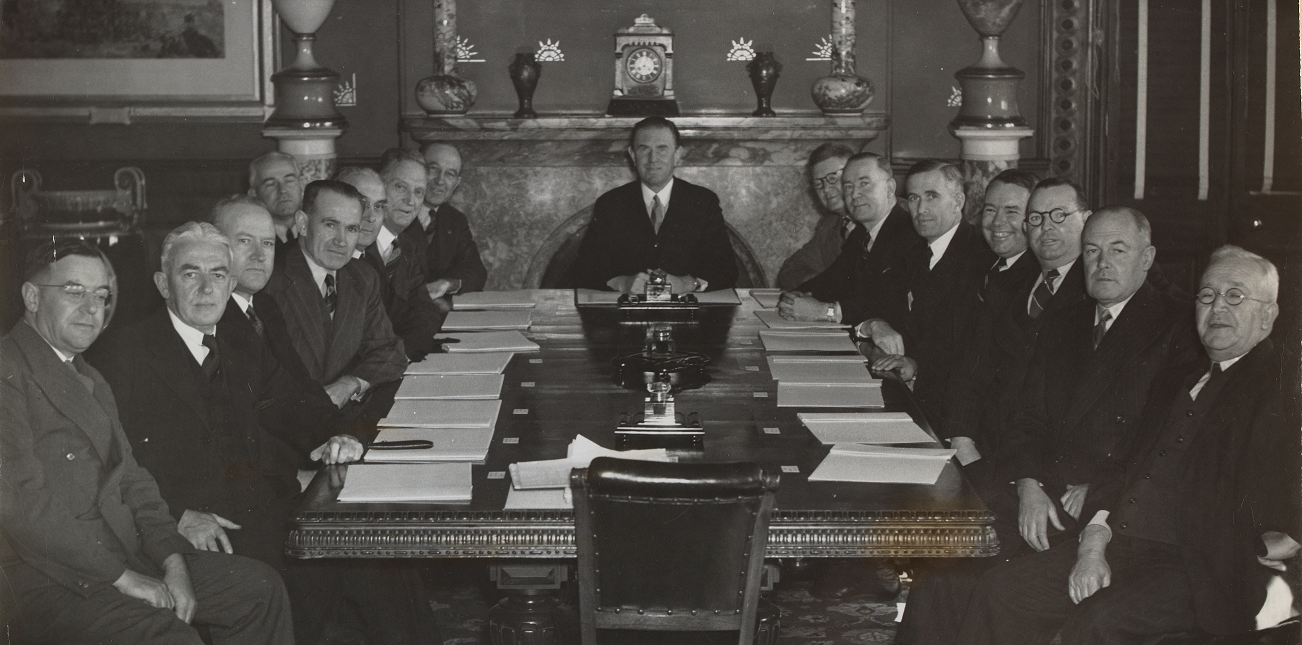
The new McKell ministry's first executive council meeting, 16 May 1941, Cahill is 4th left.

The Labor Party swept back into office at the May 1941 election, winning 26 seats over the United Australia Party's (UAP) loss of 33 seats, and McKell was commissioned by the Governor, Lord Wakehurst, to form a government. When Arncliffe was abolished at the 1941 election, Cahill switched to the new electorate of Cook's River. On 16 May 1941, Cahill was sworn in along with the rest of the ministry as Secretary of Public Works by the Governor at Government House.

Commencing office during wartime, Cahill's role as Public Works minister was crucial through the direction of various projects to facilitate continued economic growth and in support of the war effort. The government had long supported the re-establishment of a state shipbuilding enterprise following the UAP Government of Bertram Stevens closing the NSW Government Dockyard in Newcastle in 1933, and consequently in 1942 Cahill directed the opening of the NSW Government Engineering and Shipbuilding Undertaking (known as the State Dockyard) in Newcastle, which was enshrined in the passage of the Government Engineering and Shipbuilding Undertaking Act, 1943. On his role, Cahill declared:

"There was a time when the Public Works Department of New South Wales was a great organisation which built ships and bridges, and had large teams of men engaged on public works in all parts of the State. It has been my ambition to build up this department to the pinnacle it occupied in those days; to build ships and do other great engineering works, and to ensure that the whole organisation was keyed up in such a way as to afford a maximum defence effort while still performing urgent civilian public works. [...] This Government was pledged to re-establish shipbuilding as a State enterprise. The Premier entrusted this responsibility to me, and the job has been done. Within a year of taking-office we were able to say that we were building a ship to the order of the Australian Shipbuilding Board. Our engineering and shipbuilding undertaking is destined to become one of the great institutions of the Commonwealth, both in war and peace years, for it has been planned in such a way that its activities can be swung from one engineering project to another easily and smoothly."

Other projects commenced included various war works such as defence installations, air fields, prisoner-of-war camps, alongside important civil improvements to water and electricity infrastructure which were not delayed due to the war. By 1943, Cahill was already heavily involved in post-war infrastructure planning, with the McKell Government enabling significant investment in new public works projects such as new ports and roads. With the launching of the 22nd vessel from the State Dockyard in October 1945, Cahill declared that he was proud to have been involved in its successful re-establishment and noted that the Dockyard would "continue to play a significant part in the permanent establishment of shipbuilding, which is so essential to the industrial development of the Commonwealth." As the Government had predicted, with the end of the war came a great need for new investment in infrastructure, and in 1946 Cahill introduced new bills for substantial projects such as £1.7 million for a new Mental Hospital at North Ryde and £600,000 for works to dredge and improve the Cooks River and Wolli Creek.

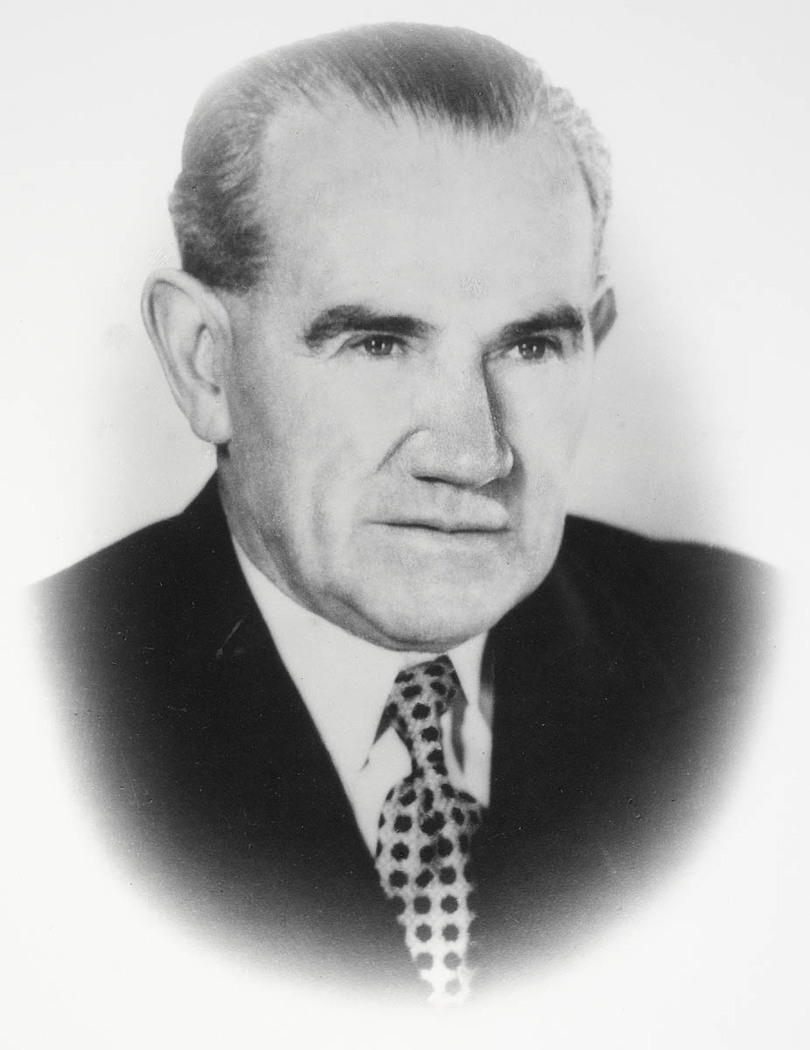
Cahill as Minister for Local Government in 1944.

In 1944 Cahill became Minister for Local Government, a position he would hold for eight years; he used this position to augment local governments' powers. He established the State Brickworks at Homebush Bay. In addition, he supervised the establishment of the Electricity Commission of New South Wales, which brought electricity to much of rural New South Wales, and the Cumberland County Council, which developed the landmark county planning scheme in 1948.

In September 1949, the serving Deputy Premier, Jack Baddeley, announced his retirement from parliament and his appointment as Director of the State Coal Mines Control Board, and Cahill stood to succeed him as deputy. At the caucus meeting on 21 September, Cahill was elected Deputy Premier 21 votes to 20 against Attorney-General Clarence Martin.

== Premier of New South Wales ==
Cahill in his office as Premier in 1956.

When James McGirr announced his resignation as premier on the grounds of ill health on 1 April 1952, Cahill, a natural successor as deputy, put himself forward as a candidate to succeed Cahill. He ran against Clive Evatt, William Francis Sheahan, Bob Heffron (by this time Education Minister), and Clarence Martin (still Attorney-General). However, the day before the ballot on 3 April, Heffron had been made aware that he would not have the numbers in caucus to win against Cahill, and consequently made arrangements to give the votes of his bloc to Cahill, in exchange for Cahill giving him support to become Deputy Premier. As a result, on 3 April Cahill defeated the only remaining rival for the premiership, namely Martin (Sheahan and Evatt had withdrawn from the contest), by 32 votes to 14. Heffron defeated Mines Secretary Joshua Arthur by 32 votes to 14 to become Deputy Premier.

Cahill won the state elections of 1953, 1956, and 1959. In November 1958, he officially opened the Wangi Power Station on Lake Macquarie.

=== Sydney Opera House ===
It was in November 1954 that Cahill first began to champion the idea of an opera house in Sydney on the site of the old Fort Macquarie Tram Depot at Bennelong Point. He announced an international competition for its design in September 1955. This competition was subsequently won by the Danish architect Jørn Utzon in January 1957. In August 1957, Cahill responded to criticisms that the opera house was an extravagance and inaccessible to the ordinary public by noting that, "the building when erected will be available for the use of every citizen, that the average working family will be able to afford to go there just as well as people in more favourable economic circumstances, that there will be nothing savouring even remotely of a class conscious barrier and that the Opera House will, in fact, be a monument to democratic nationhood in its fullest sense."

On 5 February 1959, Cahill signed the contract for the first stage of building works for the Opera House with the chairman of Lendlease and Civil & Civic, Dick Dusseldorp, and the managing director of Brederos, Jan de Vries. On the occasion of the official start of building and the laying of the foundation plaque on 2 March 1959, Cahill declared that the Sydney Opera House, "will stand not merely as an outstanding example of modern architecture or even as a world famous opera house, but as a shrine in which the great artists of the world may be seen and heard and our own artists may display the flowering of Australian culture."

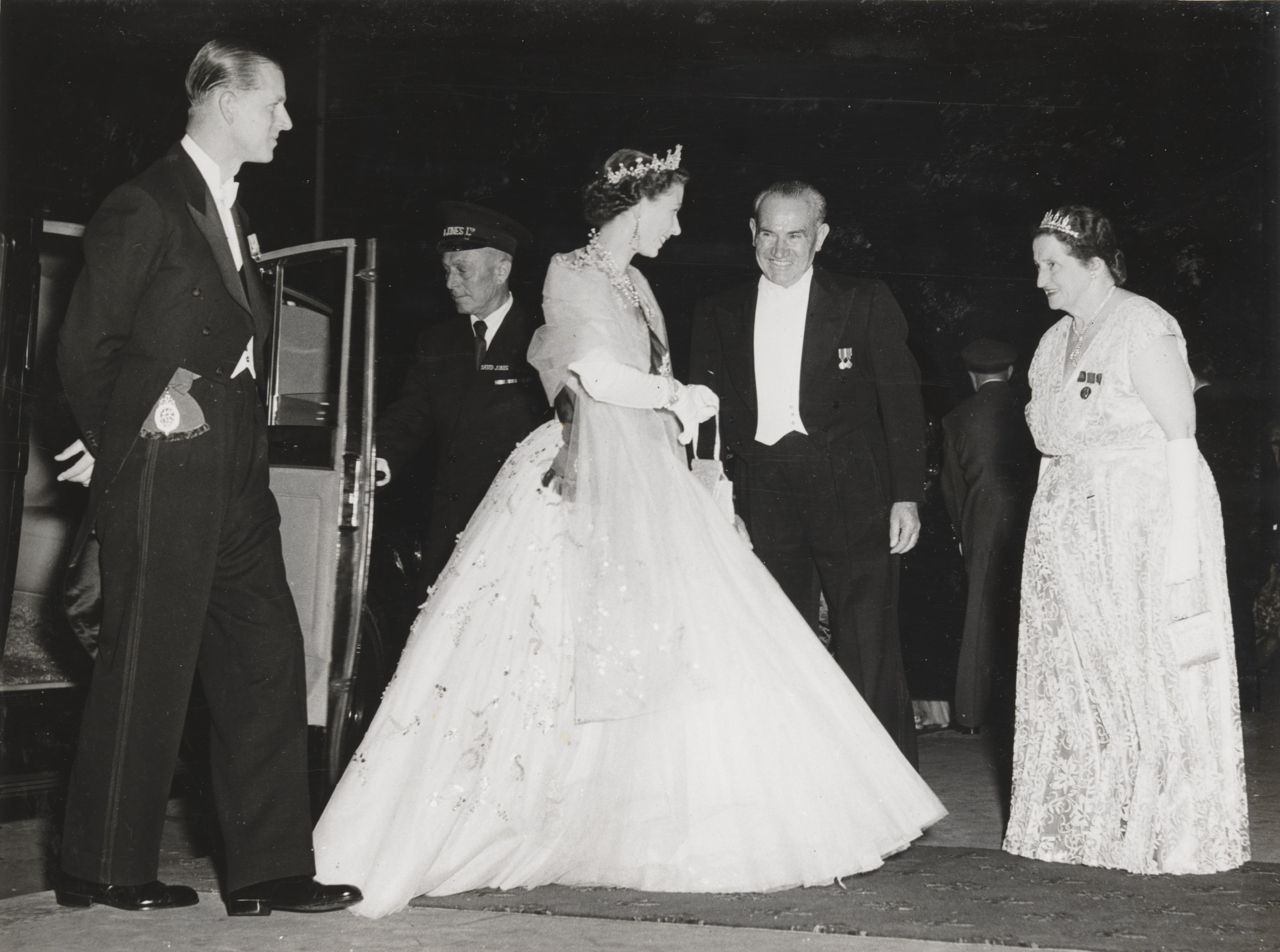
The Cahills greeting Queen Elizbeth II and Prince Philip for a State Dinner held at David Jones' Elizabeth Street store, 4 February 1954.

=== Sectarian tensions ===
Cahill's political skills, his determination to avoid another Lang-style split in the party, and his government's, and indeed personal, close alliance with Sydney's Catholic Archbishop, Cardinal Norman Gilroy, ensured that Labor in New South Wales avoided the devastating divisions which forced the party out of office in Victoria, Western Australia and Queensland during the 1950s split.

=== Illness and death in office ===
A heavy smoker, Cahill suffered increasingly poor health during 1959, with Deputy Premier Bob Heffron often acting in Cahill's place during these times. He died at Sydney Hospital of a myocardial infarction on 22 October of that year and Heffron succeeded him unopposed in the premiership. No premier of New South Wales before him had continuously remained in power as long as Cahill did and no later premier would manage to surpass the length of Cahill's tenure until Robert Askin in 1972.

== Honours and legacy ==
Family grave of Cahill at Rookwood Cemetery.

Survived by his wife, Esmey, daughters Gemma and Margaret, and sons Tom, John and Brian, Cahill was granted a state funeral and was laid-in-state at St Mary's Cathedral, Sydney. His funeral at the cathedral was attended by over 3,000 people, including Governor Sir Eric Woodward, Prime Minister Robert Menzies and Opposition Leader Herbert Evatt, and it was estimated that around 200,000 people lined the route from the cathedral to his burial place at Rookwood Cemetery. In his panegyric, Cardinal Norman Gilroy praised Cahill as a "man of immaculate integrity".

His eldest son, Thomas James Cahill, was elected to his father's vacated seat of Cook's River at the subsequent December by-election and served as an MP until his death in 1983. His second son and namesake, John Joseph Cahill, served as a judge of the Industrial Commission of New South Wales from 1971 to 1998. His wife, Esmey Cahill, died at the age of 79 on 21 June 1971 at the Cahill's long-term home at 44 Warren Road, Marrickville, and was buried beside her husband in the family plot at Rookwood Cemetery.

Over the years Cahill was given several awards. As a Member of Parliament, he received the King George VI Coronation Medal (1937), and Cahill and Esmey Cahill received the Queen Elizabeth II Coronation Medal (1953). He received an honorary Doctor of Laws (LL.D.) from the University of Sydney in 1952, an honorary Doctor of Science (D.Sc.) from the New South Wales University of Technology in 1955, and an honorary Doctor of Literature (D.Litt.) from the University of New England in 1956. On 17 December 1958, the City of Sydney decided to name the new highway across Circular Quay as the Cahill Expressway, and Cahill was present when the Blue Mountains City Council officially named Cahills Lookout in Katoomba on 6 June 1959. In 1961 the Municipality of Rockdale in his former electorate decided to name the new park in Wolli Creek as "Cahill Park".

Following Cahill's death, the new public high school in Mascot in his former seat of Cook's River also decided to honour his memory, as well as his role in the school's establishment, by naming itself the J J Cahill Memorial High School, which was officially opened by his widow, Esmey Cahill, on 24 March 1961. On the school's 50th anniversary, the principal Robyn Cowin noted that Cahill "was a man of genuine personal integrity, a family man and a great worker whose deeds spoke for themselves [...] His code of behaviour and indeed the manner of his life embodied the school motto 'Do what is right because it is right'".

== Notes ==
New South Wales Legislative Assembly
| Preceded by William Bagnall | Member for St George; 1925–1930; With: Arkins, Cann, Gosling, Bagnall | District abolished |
| New district | Member for Arncliffe; 1930–1932 | Succeeded by Horace Harper |
| Preceded by Horace Harper | Member for Arncliffe; 1935–1941 | District abolished |
| New district | Member for Cook's River; 1941–1959 | Succeeded by Tom Cahill |
Political offices
| Preceded by Lewis Martin | Secretary for Public Works; 1941–1952 | Succeeded by Jack Renshaw |
| Preceded by James McGirr as Minister for Local Government and Housing | Minister for Local Government; 1944–1952 | Succeeded by Jack Renshaw |
| Preceded by Jack Baddeley | Deputy Premier of New South Wales; 1949 – 1952 | Succeeded by Robert Heffron |
| Preceded by James McGirr | Premier of New South Wales; 1952–1959 | Succeeded by Robert Heffron |
| Preceded by James McGirr | Treasurer of New South Wales; 1952–1959 | Succeeded by Robert Heffron |
| Preceded by Clarrie Martin | Minister for Transport; 1953 | Succeeded by Ernest Wetherell |
Party political offices
| Preceded by Jack Baddeley | Deputy Leader of the New South Wales Labor Party; 1949–1952 | Succeeded by Robert Heffron |
| Preceded by James McGirr | Leader of the New South Wales Labor Party; 1952–1959 | Succeeded by Robert Heffron |
