= Tom Cahill (politician) =

Australian politician

Thomas James Cahill (12 February 1924 – 23 June 1983) was an Australian politician, affiliated with the Labor Party and elected as a member of the New South Wales Legislative Assembly.

== Biography ==
The son of John Joseph Cahill, Premier of New South Wales from 1952 to 1959, and his wife Esme, he was born in Marrickville, New South Wales. He was educated at De La Salle College, Marrickville, and then became a bank officer, working with the Rural Bank for nineteen years. He served in the Second Australian Imperial Force, 31/51st Battalion, from 1942 to 1946 in New Guinea and the Solomon Islands.

Cahill joined the Clemton Park branch of the Labor Party in 1953 and was elected to the Legislative Assembly as member for Cook's River at a December 1959 by-election triggered by the death of his father. He represented this electorate until the 1973 election, when he moved to the seat of Marrickville, which he held until his death in 1983 at Kingsgrove, New South Wales.

He married Valerie Bryant on 5 February 1949, and they had one daughter and three sons.

New South Wales Legislative Assembly
Preceded by Joseph Cahill	Member for Cook's River; 1959 – 1973	Succeeded by Abolished
Preceded by Norm Ryan	Member for Marrickville; 1973 – 1983	Succeeded by Andrew Refshauge
