= Bruce Walker (politician, born 1870) =

Australian politician

Robert Bruce Walker (6 November 1870 – 1 July 1932) was an Australian politician.

He was born at Windsor to William Walker and Henrietta Medora, née Cooper. After attending Windsor Grammar School and Cooerwull Academy at Bowenfels he worked for the Commercial Banking Company of Sydney until he was articled in his father's legal firm. On 8 June 1895 he married Lucinda Isabel Rowthorn, with whom he had four sons. In 1899 he was admitted as a solicitor and became a partner in his father's firm. He also entered the military, rising to become a major in the Australian Light Horse. In 1917 he was elected to the New South Wales Legislative Assembly as the independent member for Hawkesbury. With the introduction of proportional representation in 1920 Walker, having joined the Nationalists, was elected as one of the members for Cumberland, representing that seat until single-member districts were reintroduced in 1927 and he resumed his old seat of Hawkesbury. Walker served until his retirement in 1932, when he was succeeded by his son Bruce Jr. He died at Windsor on 1 July 1932 (aged 62).

== See also ==
- Members of the New South Wales Legislative Assembly
- 1913–1917
- 1917–1920
- 1920–1922
- 1922–1925
- 1925–1927
- 1927–1930
- 1930–1932
- Results of New South Wales state elections
- 1917 (Hawkesbury)
- 1920 (Cumberland)
- 1922 (Cumberland)
- 1925 (Cumberland)
- 1927 (Hawkesbury)
- 1930 (Hawkesbury)

New South Wales Legislative Assembly
Preceded by Brinsley Hall	Member for Hawkesbury; 1917–1920	Succeeded by Seat abolished
Preceded by New seat	Member for Cumberland; 1920–1927; Served alongside: Carr/FitzSimons/Shand, Molesworth/McGirr	Succeeded by Seat abolished
Preceded by New seat	Member for Hawkesbury; 1927–1932	Succeeded by Bruce Walker Jr
