= John Holden (Australian politician) =

English-Australian politician

John Rose Holden (22 February 1810 – 1 May 1860) was an English-Australian politician.

Holden was born at Beaminster in Dorset to the Reverend William Rose Holden and Betty Everleigh. In 1829 he joined the army, and in 1831 was posted to New South Wales. He acquired a farm near Liverpool. He left the army in 1834, and on 7 April 1834 married Mary Hutchinson, with whom he had three children. From 1843 he was a director of the Bank of New South Wales, rising to vice-president in 1846 and president in 1851. From 1842 to 1846 he was a member of Sydney City Council. He was an elected member of the New South Wales Legislative Council from 1851 to 1853 and an appointed member from 1853 to 1856. He later retired to England, where he lived with his second wife, Susan Broadhurst. Holden died at Lark Hill in Worcester in 1860.

New South Wales Legislative Council
Preceded by William Bowman	Member for Cumberland Boroughs; 1851 – 1853	Succeeded by William Bowman
