= William Bowman (Australian politician) =

Australian politician (1800–1874)

Personal details
- Born: 11 December 1800 Richmond, New South Wales
- Died: 11 December 1874 (aged 74) Richmond, New South Wales

William Bowman (11 December 1800 – 11 December 1874) was an Australian politician and an elected member of the New South Wales Legislative Council between 1843 and 1856. He was also a member of the New South Wales Legislative Assembly for 1 term from 1856 until 1858.

== Early life ==
Bowman was born in Richmond, New South Wales and was the son of John Bowman, a pioneer settler from East Lothian in Scotland, and his wife Honor née Honey, from Cornwall. He had an elementary education and worked on his father's farm from an early age. He gradually increased his land holdings with further properties in the Bathurst and on the Talbragar River and experimented with vine cultivation and the exportation of salted beef to India.

== Colonial Parliament ==
Prior to the establishment of responsible government, Bowman was elected to the partially elected New South Wales Legislative Council at the first elections held in the colony in 1843. He represented the electorate of Cumberland Boroughs (Towns of Richmond, Windsor, Campbelltown and Liverpool) and retained this seat at the subsequent elections in 1848. In 1851 he was defeated by John Holden, however Holden resigned in 1853 and Bowman was elected unopposed in the resulting by-election. At the first elections for the New South Wales Legislative Assembly after the granting of responsible government in 1856 he was elected for the seat of Cumberland Boroughs. He was defeated at the 1858 election by William Bede Dalley. He did not stand for further public office. He was the brother of George Bowman, also an elected member of the New South Wales Legislative Council.

New South Wales Legislative Council
New district	Member for Cumberland Boroughs; 1843 – 1851	Succeeded by John Holden
Preceded by John Holden	Member for Cumberland Boroughs; 1853 – 1856	Council replaced by new parliament
New South Wales Legislative Assembly
New assembly	Member for Cumberland Boroughs; 1856 – 1858	Succeeded by William Bede Dalley
