= James Shand =

Australian politician

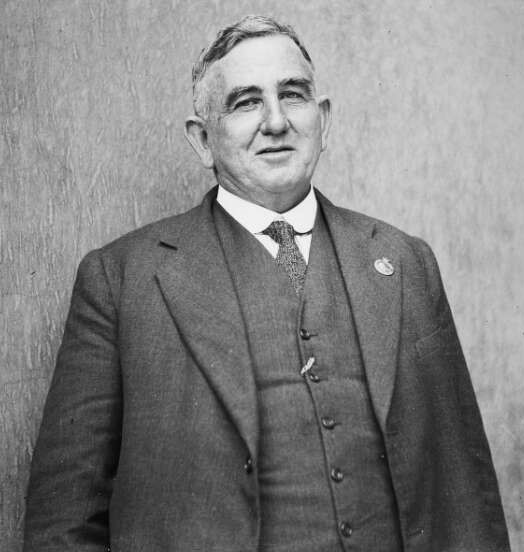

Major James Barclay Shand VD (1870 – 21 December 1944) was an Australian politician.

Born at Pyrmont to joiner George Sand and Elizabeth, née Burns, Shand was educated at Fort Street Public School before working as a clerk with Harrison, Jones and Devlin, a wool and stock firm. He married Ann Donald in 1896, with whom he had three children, and served on Drummoyne Council from 1905 to 1911.

He eventually became secretary of Harrison, Jones and Devlin and oversaw its amalgamation with Goldsbrough Mort & Co. After visiting the United Kingdom and Europe in 1914, he enlisted with the Australian Imperial Force in 1915, and served with the Mining Corps until he was invalided home in 1917 and stationed at Molongolo Concentration Camp as the quartermaster. In 1922, he received the Volunteer Officers' Decoration. He was secretary of the Master Butchers' Federation until 1926.

In 1926, Shand was elected to the New South Wales Legislative Assembly as a member for Cumberland, representing the Nationalist Party. When single-member districts were re-introduced in 1927 he was elected the member for Hornsby. He was an honorary minister from 1935 to 1938, but began to fall out with what had become the United Australia Party. He resigned from the party in 1941 and contested Ryde as an independent UAP candidate, winning the seat. He was re-elected in 1944 but died later that year.

New South Wales Legislative Assembly
Preceded by William FitzSimons	Member for Cumberland; 1926–1927; Served alongside: McGirr, Walker	Succeeded by Seat abolished
Preceded by New seat	Member for Hornsby; 1927–1941	Succeeded by Sydney Storey
Preceded by Arthur Williams	Member for Ryde; 1941–1944	Succeeded by Eric Hearnshaw
