= Jim McGirr =

Australian politician

The Honourable James McGirr JP
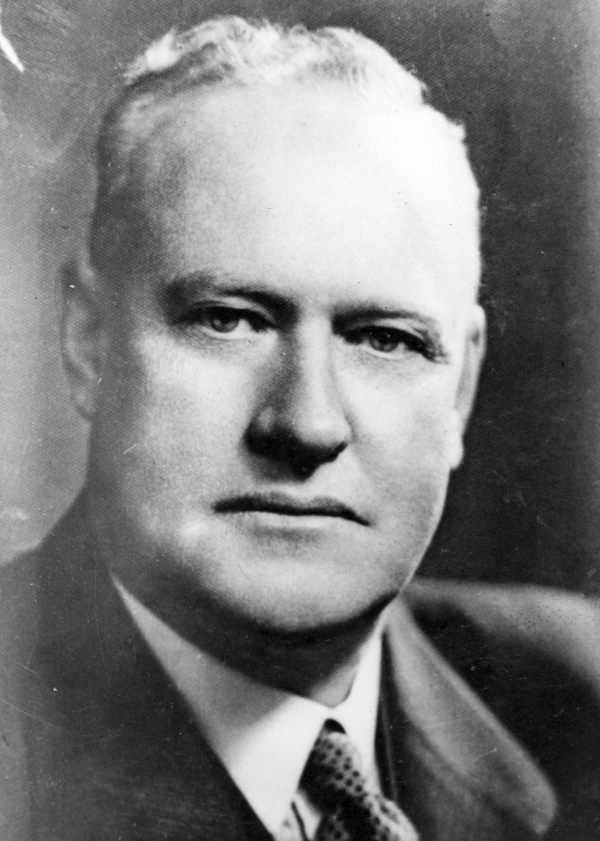

28th Premier of New South Wales
- In office 6 February 1947 – 2 April 1952
- Monarchs: George VI; Elizabeth II
- Governor: Sir John Northcott
- Deputy: Jack Baddeley; Joseph Cahill
- Preceded by: William McKell
- Succeeded by: Joseph Cahill

Personal details
- Born: 6 February 1890 Parkes, New South Wales, Australia
- Died: 27 October 1957 (age 67) Homebush, New South Wales, Australia
- Party: Australian Labor Party
- Spouse: Valerie Armstrong (m. 1932)
- Relations: Patrick McGirr (brother); Greg McGirr (brother); Trixie Gardner (niece)

James McGirr (6 February 1890 – 27 October 1957) was an Australian politician. He served as premier of New South Wales from 1947 to 1952, holding office as leader of the Australian Labor Party (ALP). He led the party to victory at the 1947 and 1950 New South Wales state elections. He was a pharmacist by profession and the younger brother of Patrick and Greg McGirr, who were also members of parliament; Greg also led the ALP briefly but was never premier.

He married and had three children, including Margaret, Patrick and James.

== Early life ==
A Catholic, McGirr was the seventh son of John Patrick McGirr, farmer and Irish immigrant, and Mary McGirr, whose maiden name was O'Sullivan. Born in Parkes, New South Wales, he grew up on a dairy farm near that town. Educated mostly at St Stanislaus College, Bathurst, he was later apprenticed to his brother Greg McGirr, a pharmacist at Parkes. He soon forfeited his apprenticeship to work in stockyards for a while, but had to give up that work when he was thrown from a horse and seriously injured.

Subsequently, he resumed his apprenticeship and attended the University of Sydney; he was registered as a pharmacist in 1913. Employed by Washington H Soul Pattinson in Pitt Street, he later opened a pharmacy in Parkes, specialising in veterinarians' prescriptions. Later still, he operated pharmacies in partnership with his brother in two Sydney suburbs: Marrickville and Kings Cross.

== Parliamentary career ==
McGirr followed his brothers Greg and Patrick into ALP politics and joined the Parkes branch of the party in 1906. In 1922, Greg vacated his seat as a member of the Legislative Assembly for Cootamundra, and stood successfully for a Sydney electorate. He managed to get Jim endorsement on the party ticket for Cootamundra and he was duly elected. Due to local party opposition in 1925, he was obliged to find another seat in 1925; and he successfully contested Cumberland in western Sydney. In 1927, proportional representation was abandoned and Cumberland was abolished. He then stood for Bankstown, which he held until 1950. From 1950 to 1952 he was the member for another western Sydney constituency, namely, Liverpool.

When the Lang Government came to power, McGirr became Minister for Health from November 1930 to June 1931. He was Minister for Local Government from June 1931 to May 1932 and became Minister for Transport in March 1932. On 13 May 1932, the Governor Sir Philip Game dismissed Lang and installed Bertram Stevens as Premier. The United Australia Party (UAP) won the subsequent election.

In October 1932 McGirr married Valerie Cecilia Armstrong. Lang continued to lead the New South Wales branch of the Labor Party, which had effectively seceded from the Federal Labor Party, when Lang's supporters sided with the UAP to bring down the Scullin Labor government in November 1931. McGirr continued to be a loyal supporter of Lang throughout the 1930s, even though Lang Labor did not win any elections. When Lang left the party to found the Australian Labor Party (Non-Communist) in April 1940, McGirr and six other parliamentarians followed him. However, they returned to the Labor Party before the May 1941 election that brought William McKell's government to power.

McGirr became Minister for Local Government and Housing in the new Government, the only one of the ex-Langite faction appointed to Cabinet. He failed to make significant progress on local government amalgamation; but he did establish the Housing Commission of New South Wales, which became an important state body dealing with the post-World War II and post-Depression housing shortage. As a result, he was given sole responsibility for housing in 1944.

== Premiership ==
In 1947, Prime Minister Ben Chifley named McKell as Governor-General of Australia, initiating a struggle between, on one side, Bob Heffron (supported by the Party Executive, McKell, many urban members, and many radical members) and, on the other side, McGirr (supported mainly by ex-Langite, rural and Catholic members). Eventually McGirr won by just two votes. He became Premier on his 57th birthday.

Decent, humane, well-liked, and personally free from corruption, McGirr as Premier was a great procrastinator, and delayed many proposals. Even after the ALP won the 1947 state election, McGirr proved unable to increase significantly the representation of his supporters in the Cabinet as a whole.

An ambitious public works program, which McGirr had promised in the 1947 campaign, was disrupted by post-war shortages and strikes. He also publicly threatened to resign because the party organisation had disendorsed four members of the Legislative Assembly for failing to follow the party's dictates in a vote for the Upper House. Subsequently, though, he withdrew his resignation threat, leaving him looking weak.

The 1950 election produced such a big anti-ALP swing that it left the government depending for its survival upon the votes of two of the disendorsed members, who had won their seats as independents. Consequently, McGirr had to deal with the independents as well as a cabinet full of factional opponents. On 2 April 1952, he resigned from the Premiership; Joseph Cahill succeeded him. He afterwards took up a controversial appointment as Chairman of the Maritime Services Board.

McGirr died of a coronary occlusion on 27 October 1957, at Homebush, inner-western Sydney. He was survived by his wife Valerie Cecilia, daughter Margaret, and two sons, Patrick and James. His niece Trixie Gardner became a Conservative politician in the United Kingdom and is the only Australian woman to have been made a life peeress of the UK parliament, as Baroness Gardner of Parkes.

== See also ==
- Political families of Australia

== Notes ==
New South Wales Legislative Assembly
Preceded by Greg McGirr	Member for Cootamundra; 1922 – 1925; With: Loughlin, Main	Succeeded by Kenneth Hoad
Preceded by Voltaire Molesworth	Member for Cumberland; 1925 – 1927; With: FitzSimons/Shand, Walker	District abolished
New district	Member for Bankstown; 1927 – 1950	Succeeded by Spence Powell
New district	Member for Liverpool; 1950 – 1952	Succeeded by Jack Mannix
Political offices
Preceded by Richard Arthur	Minister for Health; 1930 – 1931	Succeeded by Bill Ely
Preceded by William McKell	Minister for Local Government; 1931 – 1932	Succeeded by Michael Bruxner
New title	Minister for Transport; 1932	Succeeded by Michael Bruxner
Preceded by William McKell as Minister for Local Government	Minister for Local Government and Housing; 1941 – 1944	Succeeded by Joseph Cahill as Minister for Local Government
Preceded by William McKell as Minister for Local Government	Minister for Local Government and Housing; 1941 – 1944	Succeeded by Himself as Minister for Housing
Preceded by Himself	Minister for Housing; 1944 – 1947	Succeeded by Clive Evatt
Preceded by William McKell	Premier of New South Wales; 1947 – 1952	Succeeded by Joseph Cahill
Preceded by William McKell	Treasurer of New South Wales; 1947 – 1952	Succeeded by Joseph Cahill
Preceded by Eddie Graham	Minister for Agriculture; 1947	Succeeded by Eddie Graham
Preceded by Jack Baddeley	Minister for National Emergency Services; 1949	Office abolished
Preceded by Jack Baddeley	Secretary for Mines; 1949	Succeeded by William Dickson
Party political offices
Preceded by William McKell	Leader of the Australian Labor Party in New South Wales; 1947 – 1952	Succeeded by Joseph Cahill
