= Cumberland Times and Western Advertiser =

Australian newspaper

Cumberland Times and Western Advertiser, front page, 4 October 1845

Cumberland Times and Western Advertiser, also published as Parramatta Chronicle And Cumberland General Advertiser and Cumberland Times, was an English language newspaper published weekly in Parramatta, New South Wales from 1845 to 1911.

== History ==
This paper started as two separate newspapers for the population of Parramatta and Windsor in 1843. In 1845 publisher Edmund Mason sold the Parramatta Chronicle and Cumberland General Advertiser to B.E. Bailey. The Cumberland Times and Western Advertiser was published for the first time to meet the needs of Western Sydney. The weekly newspaper featured news from Parramatta and Liverpool as well as regional areas of New South Wales including Bathurst, Maitland, the Lower Murrumbidgee, Goulburn and Queanbeyan. Publication ceased in 1911.

== Digitisation ==
The Cumberland Times and Western Advertiser has been digitised as part of the Australian Newspapers Digitisation Program of the National Library of Australia.

== See also ==
- List of newspapers in Australia
- List of newspapers in New South Wales
