= Electoral district of Cook's River =

Former state electoral district of New South Wales, Australia

Cook's River New South Wales—Legislative Assembly
- State: New South Wales
- Created: 1941
- Abolished: 1973
- Namesake: Cooks River
- Demographic: Urban
Electorates around Cook's River:
Marrickville	Redfern	Redfern
Dulwich Hill; Earlwood	Cook's River	Botany/Maroubra
Rockdale	Sutherland	Botany/Maroubra

Cook's River was an electoral district of the Legislative Assembly in the Australian state of New South Wales, created in 1941 and named after inner southwestern Sydney's Cooks River. It was abolished in 1973.

== History ==
Cook's River was created by the 1940 redistribution, in which the district of Arncliffe was abolished, with Cook's River absorbing east Arncliffe and Rockdale absorbing the balance. Cook's River also included the suburbs of Erskinville, Mascot, St Peters and Tempe. Joseph Cahill was the member for Arncliffe and elected to contest Cook's River.

Cook's River was abolished at the 1973 redistribution and was divided between Rockdale and the new district of Heffron. The member for Marrickville, Norm Ryan, stood aside so that Tom Cahill could contest that seat.

== Members for Cook's River ==
Member	Party	Term
Joseph Cahill	Labor	1941–1959
Tom Cahill	Labor	1959–1973

== Election results ==
1971 New South Wales state election: Cook's River
Party	Candidate	Votes	%	±%
Labor	Tom Cahill	17,427	66.1	+1.0
Liberal	Kenneth McKimm	8,920	33.9	−1.0
Total formal votes		26,347	96.3	
Informal votes		1,010	3.7	
Turnout		27,357	92.2	
Labor hold		Swing	+1.0	
