= Electoral district of Cumberland Boroughs =

Former state electoral district of New South Wales, Australia

Cumberland Boroughs was an electoral district of the Legislative Assembly in the Australian state of New South Wales from 1856 to 1859, consisting of the Cumberland County towns of Richmond, Windsor, Liverpool and Campbelltown, but not the surrounding rural areas, which were in Cumberland (South Riding) and Cumberland (North Riding). The district was abolished in 1859, with Richmond and Windsor forming the new electorate of Windsor, Campbelltown was included in Narellan and Liverpool became part of Central Cumberland.

== Members for Cumberland Boroughs ==
Member	Party	Period
William Bowman	None	1856–1857
William Dalley	None	1858–1859

== Election results ==
1858 New South Wales colonial election: Cumberland Boroughs 22 January
Candidate	Votes	%
William Dalley (elected)	246	52.1
William Bowman (defeated)	168	35.6
William Redman	58	12.3
Total formal votes	472	100.0
Informal votes	0	0
Turnout	472	65.7

William Dalley had been defeated as a sitting member for Sydney City.
