= First Perrottet ministry =

98th New South Wales government led by Dominic Perrottet

- 98th Cabinet of New South Wales

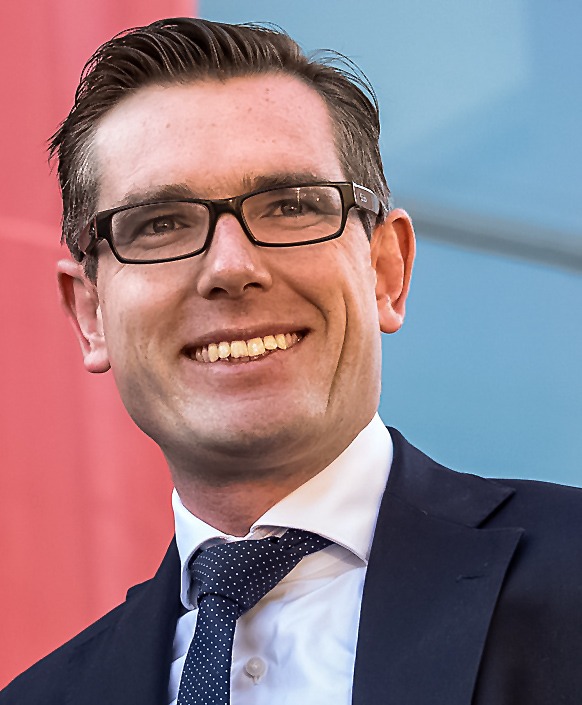
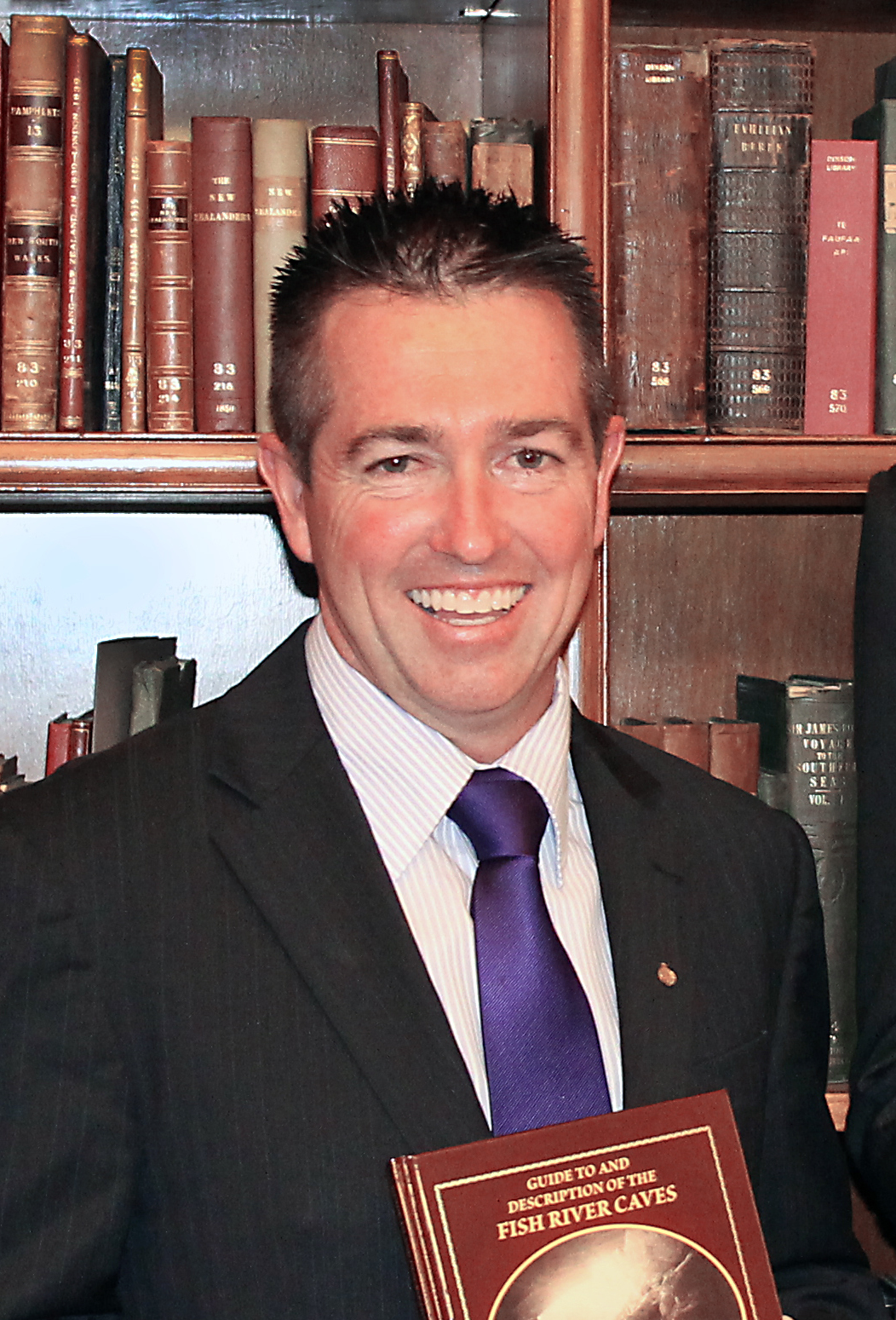
- Dominic Perrottet Paul Toole
- Date formed: 5 October 2021
- Date dissolved: 21 December 2021

People and organisations
- Monarch: Queen Elizabeth II
- Governor: Margaret Beazley
- Premier: Dominic Perrottet
- Deputy Premier: Paul Toole
- Total no. of members: 21
- Member party: Liberal–National Coalition
- Status in legislature: Minority Coalition Government
- Opposition party: Labor
- Opposition leader: Chris Minns

History
- Predecessor: Second Berejiklian ministry
- Successor: Second Perrottet ministry

The First Perrottet ministry or First Perrottet–Toole ministry was the 98th ministry of the Government of New South Wales, and was led by Dominic Perrottet, the state's 46th Premier.

The Liberal–National coalition ministry was formed following the resignation of the previous Premier, Gladys Berejiklian and the election of Perrottet as leader of the Liberal Party on 5 October 2021. Stuart Ayres was elected as deputy party leader. Separate to the Liberal Party leadership election, the National Party also had its own leadership election on 6 October 2021, following the resignation of John Barilaro as party leader, who said it was "the right time for me to hand the reins over". Paul Toole was elected as National Party leader and subsequently replaced Barilaro as Deputy Premier of New South Wales.

The ministry was largely unchanged from the previous Berejiklian ministry as Perrottet opted not to reshuffle the cabinet yet. The ministry continued until the major cabinet reshuffle on 21 December 2021 when the Second Perrottet ministry was sworn in. The Parliament of New South Wales considers the second ministry to be a separate and new ministry from the first.

== Composition of ministry ==
Upon his election as Liberal Party leader, Perrottet announced there would not be a reshuffle until later in the year, with the focus being on bringing New South Wales out of COVID-19 lockdown. This meant that all ministers would retain their portfolios from the previous Berejiklian ministry except for where there were resignations and/or role changes as a result of the new leadership. (Note: John Barilaro's trade and industry portfolio went to Stuart Ayres while his regional New South Wales portfolio went to Paul Toole.) (Note: Dominic Perrottet's treasury portfolio went to Matt Kean.) (Note: Andrew Constance also announced his resignation, and his transport and roads portfolio went to Rob Stokes.)

Perrottet, Ayres, Kean and Brad Hazzard were the first ministers to be sworn in by the Governor Margaret Beazley on 5 October 2021. Toole and the other ministers were sworn in on 6 October 2021.

In the order of seniority:

Portfolio	Officeholder	Party	Term start	Term end	Term in office
Premier (Note: Due to the agreement between the Liberal Party and the National Party, the Premier is conventionally the Leader of the Liberal Party, while the Deputy Premier is Leader of the National Party.)	Dominic Perrottet	Liberal	5 October 2021	21 December 2021	77 days
Deputy Premier	Paul Toole	National	6 October 2021	21 December 2021	76 days
Minister for Regional New South Wales	Paul Toole	National	6 October 2021	21 December 2021	76 days
Minister for Regional Transport and Roads	Paul Toole	National	6 October 2021	21 December 2021	76 days
Minister for Jobs, Investment, Tourism and Western Sydney	Stuart Ayres	Liberal	5 October 2021	21 December 2021	77 days
Minister for Trade and Industry	Stuart Ayres	Liberal	5 October 2021	21 December 2021	77 days
Minister for Mental Health, Regional Youth and Women	Bronnie Taylor MLC	National	6 October 2021	21 December 2021	76 days
Treasurer	Matt Kean	Liberal	5 October 2021	21 December 2021	77 days
Minister for Energy and Environment	Matt Kean	Liberal	5 October 2021	21 December 2021	77 days
Special Minister of State	Don Harwin MLC	Liberal	6 October 2021	21 December 2021	76 days
Minister for the Public Service and Employee Relations, Aboriginal Affairs, and the Arts	Don Harwin MLC	Liberal	6 October 2021	21 December 2021	76 days
Vice-President of the Executive Council; Leader of Government Business in the Legislative Council	Don Harwin MLC	Liberal	6 October 2021	21 December 2021	76 days
Attorney General	Mark Speakman SC	Liberal	6 October 2021	21 December 2021	76 days
Minister for Prevention of Domestic and Sexual Violence	Mark Speakman SC	Liberal	6 October 2021	21 December 2021	76 days
Minister for Finance and Small Business	Damien Tudehope MLC	Liberal	6 October 2021	21 December 2021	76 days
Minister for Health and Medical Research	Brad Hazzard	Liberal	5 October 2021	21 December 2021	77 days
Minister for Planning and Public Spaces	Rob Stokes	Liberal	6 October 2021	21 December 2021	76 days
Minister for Transport and Roads	Rob Stokes	Liberal	6 October 2021	21 December 2021	76 days
Minister for Customer Service	Victor Dominello	Liberal	6 October 2021	21 December 2021	76 days
Minister for Digital	Victor Dominello	Liberal	6 October 2021	21 December 2021	76 days
Minister for Education and Early Childhood Learning	Sarah Mitchell MLC	National	6 October 2021	21 December 2021	76 days
Minister for Police and Emergency Services	David Elliott	Liberal	6 October 2021	21 December 2021	76 days
Minister for Water, Property and Housing	Melinda Pavey	National	6 October 2021	21 December 2021	76 days
Minister for Agriculture and Western New South Wales	Adam Marshall	National	6 October 2021	21 December 2021	76 days
Minister for Counter Terrorism and Corrections	Anthony Roberts	Liberal	6 October 2021	21 December 2021	76 days
Minister for Local Government	Shelley Hancock	Liberal	6 October 2021	21 December 2021	76 days
Minister for Better Regulation and Innovation	Kevin Anderson	National	6 October 2021	21 December 2021	76 days
Minister for Skills and Tertiary Education	Geoff Lee	Liberal	6 October 2021	21 December 2021	76 days
Minister for Sport, Multiculturalism, Seniors and Veterans	Natalie Ward MLC	Liberal	6 October 2021	21 December 2021	76 days
Minister for Families, Communities and Disability Services	Alister Henskens	Liberal	6 October 2021	21 December 2021	76 days

Ministers are members of the Legislative Assembly unless otherwise noted.

== See also ==
- Members of the New South Wales Legislative Assembly, 2019–2023
- Members of the New South Wales Legislative Council, 2019–2023

== Notes ==
Preceded by Second Berejiklian ministry	First Perrottet ministry 2021	Succeeded by Second Perrottet ministry
