= Pre-election pendulum for the 2019 New South Wales state election =

The following is a Mackerras pendulum for the 2019 New South Wales state election.

"Safe" seats require a swing of more than 10 points to change, "fairly safe" seats a swing of 6–10 points, and "marginal" seats less than 6 points.

All margins are Coalition vs. Labor unless specified otherwise.

Liberal/National seats (52)
Marginal
| East Hills | Glenn Brookes | LIB | 0.4 points |
| Upper Hunter | Michael Johnsen | NAT | 2.2 points |
| Monaro | John Barilaro | NAT | 2.5 points |
| Lismore | Thomas George | NAT | 2.9 v GRN |
| Coogee | Bruce Notley-Smith | LIB | 2.9 points |
| Tweed | Geoff Provest | NAT | 3.2 points |
| Murray | Austin Evans | NAT | 3.3 points v SFF |
| North Shore | Felicity Wilson | LIB | 4.7 points v IND |
Fairly safe
| Penrith | Stuart Ayres | LIB | 6.2 points |
| Goulburn | Pru Goward | LIB | 6.6 points |
| Oatley | Mark Coure | LIB | 6.6 points |
| Holsworthy | Melanie Gibbons | LIB | 6.7 points |
| Heathcote | Lee Evans | LIB | 7.6 points |
| Bega | Andrew Constance | LIB | 8.2 points |
| Kiama | Gareth Ward | LIB | 8.7 points |
| Seven Hills | Mark Taylor | LIB | 8.7 points |
| Myall Lakes | Stephen Bromhead | NAT | 8.7 points |
| Terrigal | Adam Crouch | LIB | 9.0 points |
| South Coast | Shelley Hancock | LIB | 9.6 points |
| Mulgoa | Tanya Davies | LIB | 9.7 points |
| Clarence | Chris Gulaptis | NAT | 9.7 points |
Safe
| Tamworth | Kevin Anderson | NAT | 10.0 points v IND |
| Manly | James Griffin | LIB | 10.5 points v IND |
| Cootamundra | Steph Cooke | NAT | 10.5 points |
| Oxley | Melinda Pavey | NAT | 10.9 points |
| Ryde | Victor Dominello | LIB | 11.5 points |
| Riverstone | Kevin Conolly | LIB | 12.2 points |
| Parramatta | Geoff Lee | LIB | 12.9 points |
| Barwon | Kevin Humphries | NAT | 12.9 points |
| Miranda | Eleni Petinos | LIB | 13.0 points |
| Albury | Greg Aplin | LIB | 13.2 points |
| Coffs Harbour | Andrew Fraser | NAT | 14.3 points |
| Bathurst | Paul Toole | NAT | 15.8 points |
| Epping | Damien Tudehope | LIB | 16.2 points |
| Wollondilly | Jai Rowell | LIB | 17.3 points |
| Hawkesbury | Dominic Perrottet | LIB | 17.8 points |
| Lane Cove | Anthony Roberts | LIB | 17.8 points |
| Camden | Chris Patterson | LIB | 18.3 points |
| Drummoyne | John Sidoti | LIB | 18.8 points |
| Hornsby | Matt Kean | LIB | 18.9 points |
| Port Macquarie | Leslie Williams | NAT | 19.0 points |
| Dubbo | Troy Grant | NAT | 20.4 points |
| Cronulla | Mark Speakman | LIB | 20.9 points |
| Baulkham Hills | David Elliott | LIB | 21.8 points |
| Vaucluse | Gabrielle Upton | LIB | 22.9 points v GRN |
| Ku-ring-gai | Alister Henskens | LIB | 23.0 points |
| Willoughby | Gladys Berejiklian | LIB | 24.4 points v GRN |
| Wakehurst | Brad Hazzard | LIB | 25.2 points |
| Pittwater | Rob Stokes | LIB | 25.7 points v GRN |
| Northern Tablelands | Adam Marshall | NAT | 27.1 points |
| Davidson | Jonathan O'Dea | LIB | 28.8 points v GRN |
| Castle Hill | Ray Williams | LIB | 29.4 points |

Labor seats (34)
Marginal
| The Entrance | David Mehan | ALP | 0.4 points |
| Strathfield | Jodi McKay | ALP | 1.8 points |
| Granville | Julia Finn | ALP | 2.1 points |
| Prospect | Hugh McDermott | ALP | 3.4 points |
| Port Stephens | Kate Washington | ALP | 4.7 points |
| Rockdale | Steve Kamper | ALP | 4.8 points |
| Auburn | Luke Foley | ALP | 5.9 points |
Fairly safe
| Kogarah | Chris Minns | ALP | 6.9 points |
| Campbelltown | Greg Warren | ALP | 7.3 points |
| Newcastle | Tim Crakanthorp | ALP | 7.4 points |
| Wollongong | Paul Scully | ALP | 8.0 points v IND |
| Blue Mountains | Trish Doyle | ALP | 8.1 points |
| Macquarie Fields | Anoulack Chanthivong | ALP | 8.1 points |
| Wyong | David Harris | ALP | 8.7 points |
| Londonderry | Prue Car | ALP | 8.8 points |
Safe
| Summer Hill | Jo Haylen | ALP | 10.5 v GRN |
| Maroubra | Michael Daley | ALP | 10.8 points |
| Gosford | Liesl Tesch | ALP | 12.5 points |
| Charlestown | Jodie Harrison | ALP | 12.9 points |
| Swansea | Yasmin Catley | ALP | 13.0 points |
| Maitland | Jenny Aitchison | ALP | 13.8 points |
| Bankstown | Tania Mihailuk | ALP | 14.0 points |
| Heffron | Ron Hoenig | ALP | 14.1 points |
| Mount Druitt | Edmond Atalla | ALP | 15.4 points |
| Shellharbour | Anna Watson | ALP | 17.0 points |
| Cabramatta | Nick Lalich | ALP | 17.2 points |
| Keira | Ryan Park | ALP | 17.4 points |
| Fairfield | Guy Zangari | ALP | 17.8 points |
| Wallsend | Sonia Hornery | ALP | 20.8 points |
| Liverpool | Paul Lynch | ALP | 20.9 points |
| Lakemba | Jihad Dib | ALP | 21.6 points |
| Cessnock | Clayton Barr | ALP | 22.0 points |
| Canterbury | Sophie Cotsis | ALP | 27.8 Points v CDP |
| Blacktown | Stephen Bali | ALP | 32.3 Points v CDP |
Crossbench seats (7)
| Orange | Philip Donato | SFF | 0.1 points vs NAT |
| Ballina | Tamara Smith | GRN | 3.1 points v NAT |
| Balmain | Jamie Parker | GRN | 4.7 points v ALP |
| Sydney | Alex Greenwich | IND | 8.1 v LIB |
| Newtown | Jenny Leong | GRN | 9.3 points v ALP |
| Wagga Wagga | Joe McGirr | IND | 9.6 points v LIB |
| Lake Macquarie | Greg Piper | IND | 10.7 v ALP |
