= Members of the New South Wales Legislative Assembly, 2019–2023 =

Members of the New South Wales Legislative Assembly who served in the 57th Parliament hold their seats from 2019 to 2023. They were elected at the 2019 state election on 23 March 2019. The Speaker was Shelley Hancock until May 2019 and then Jonathan O'Dea.

Name	Party	Electorate	Term in office
Jenny Aitchison	Labor	Maitland	2015–present
Kevin Anderson	National	Tamworth	2011–present
Edmond Atalla	Labor	Mount Druitt	2015–present
Stuart Ayres	Liberal	Penrith	2010–2023
Stephen Bali	Labor	Blacktown	2017–present
John Barilaro (Note: On 31 December 2021, the Nationals member for Monaro, John Barilaro, resigned. Nichole Overall (Nationals) was elected to replace him at a by-election held on 12 February 2022.)	National	Monaro	2011–2021
Clayton Barr	Labor	Cessnock	2011–present
Gladys Berejiklian (Note: On 30 December 2021, the Liberal member for Willoughby, Gladys Berejiklian, resigned. Tim James (Liberal) was elected to replace her at a by-election held on 12 February 2022.)	Liberal	Willoughby	2003–2021
Stephen Bromhead (Note: On 16 March 2023, the member for Myall Lakes, Stephen Bromhead, died in office.)	National	Myall Lakes	2011–2023
Roy Butler	Shooters, Fishers, Farmers/Independent (Note: On 12 December 2022, the member for Barwon, Roy Butler, resigned from the Shooters, Fishers and Farmers Party to sit as an independent.)	Barwon	2019–present
Prue Car	Labor	Londonderry	2015–present
Yasmin Catley	Labor	Swansea	2015–present
Anoulack Chanthivong	Labor	Macquarie Fields	2015–present
Justin Clancy	Liberal	Albury	2019–present
Kevin Conolly	Liberal	Riverstone	2011–2023
Andrew Constance (Note: On 30 December 2021, the Liberal member for Bega, Andrew Constance, resigned. Michael Holland (Labor) was elected to replace him at a by-election held on 12 February 2022.)	Liberal	Bega	2003–2021
Steph Cooke	National	Cootamundra	2017–present
Sophie Cotsis	Labor	Canterbury	2016–present
Mark Coure	Liberal	Oatley	2011–present
Tim Crakanthorp	Labor	Newcastle	2014–present
Adam Crouch	Liberal	Terrigal	2015–present
Michael Daley	Labor	Maroubra	2005–present
Helen Dalton	Shooters, Fishers, Farmers/Independent (Note: On 3 March 2022, the member for Murray, Helen Dalton, resigned from the Shooters, Fishers and Farmers Party to sit as an independent.)	Murray	2019–present
Tanya Davies	Liberal	Mulgoa	2011–present
Jihad Dib	Labor	Lakemba	2015–present
Victor Dominello	Liberal	Ryde	2008–2023
Philip Donato	Shooters, Fishers, Farmers/Independent (Note: On 12 December 2022, the member for Orange, Philip Donato, resigned from the Shooters, Fishers and Farmers Party to sit as an independent.)	Orange	2016–present
Trish Doyle	Labor	Blue Mountains	2015–present
David Elliott	Liberal	Baulkham Hills	2011–2023
Lee Evans	Liberal	Heathcote	2011–2023
Julia Finn	Labor	Granville	2015–present
Melanie Gibbons	Liberal	Holsworthy	2011–2023
Alex Greenwich	Independent	Sydney	2012–present
James Griffin	Liberal	Manly	2017–present
Chris Gulaptis	National	Clarence	2011–2023
Shelley Hancock	Liberal	South Coast	2003–2023
David Harris	Labor	Wyong	2007–2011, 2015–present
Jodie Harrison	Labor	Charlestown	2014–present
Jo Haylen	Labor	Summer Hill	2015–present
Brad Hazzard	Liberal	Wakehurst	1991–2023
Alister Henskens	Liberal	Ku-ring-gai	2015–present
Ron Hoenig	Labor	Heffron	2012–present
Michael Holland	Labor	Bega	2022–present
Sonia Hornery	Labor	Wallsend	2007–present
Tim James	Liberal	Willoughby	2022–present
Michael Johnsen (Note: On 31 March 2021, the Nationals member for Upper Hunter, Michael Johnsen, resigned. Dave Layzell (Nationals) was elected to replace him at a by-election held on 22 May 2021.)	National	Upper Hunter	2015–2021
Steve Kamper	Labor	Rockdale	2015–present
Matt Kean	Liberal	Hornsby	2011–present
Nick Lalich	Labor	Cabramatta	2008–2023
Dave Layzell	National	Upper Hunter	2021–present
Geoff Lee	Liberal	Parramatta	2011–2023
Jenny Leong	Greens	Newtown	2015–present
Jason Yat-Sen Li (Note: On 31 December 2021, the Labor member for Strathfield, Jodi McKay, resigned. Jason Yat-Sen Li (Labor) was elected to replace her at a by-election held on 12 February 2022.)	Labor	Strathfield	2022–present
Wendy Lindsay	Liberal	East Hills	2019–2023
Paul Lynch	Labor	Liverpool	1995–2023
Adam Marshall	National	Northern Tablelands	2013–present
Hugh McDermott	Labor	Prospect	2015–present
Joe McGirr	Independent	Wagga Wagga	2018–present
Jodi McKay	Labor	Strathfield	2007–2011, 2015–2021
David Mehan	Labor	The Entrance	2015–present
Tania Mihailuk	Labor/Independent/One Nation (Note: On 20 October 2022, the member for Bankstown, Tania Mihailuk, resigned from the Labor Party to sit as an independent and then as a member of Pauline Hanson's One Nation. She officially resigned from the Legislative Assembly on 1/3/2023, to focus on her campaign to move to the Legislative Council.)	Bankstown	2011–2023
Chris Minns	Labor	Kogarah	2015–present
Jonathan O'Dea	Liberal	Davidson	2007–2023
Marjorie O'Neill	Labor	Coogee	2019–present
Nichole Overall	National	Monaro	2022–2023
Ryan Park	Labor	Keira	2011–present
Jamie Parker	Greens	Balmain	2011–2023
Melinda Pavey	National	Oxley	2015–2023
Dominic Perrottet	Liberal	Epping	2011–present
Eleni Petinos	Liberal	Miranda	2015–present
Greg Piper	Independent	Lake Macquarie	2007–present
Robyn Preston	Liberal	Hawkesbury	2019–present
Geoff Provest	National	Tweed	2007–present
Anthony Roberts	Liberal	Lane Cove	2003–present
Janelle Saffin	Labor	Lismore	2019–present
Dugald Saunders	National	Dubbo	2019–present
Paul Scully	Labor	Wollongong	2016–present
Peter Sidgreaves	Liberal	Camden	2019–2023
John Sidoti	Liberal/Independent (Note: On 3 March 2021, the Liberal member for Drummoyne, John Sidoti, resigned from the party and moved to the crossbench to sit as an independent.)	Drummoyne	2011–2023
Gurmesh Singh	National	Coffs Harbour	2019–present
Nathaniel Smith	Liberal	Wollondilly	2019–2023
Tamara Smith	Greens	Ballina	2015–present
Mark Speakman	Liberal	Cronulla	2011–present
Rob Stokes	Liberal	Pittwater	2007–2023
Mark Taylor	Liberal	Seven Hills	2015–present
Liesl Tesch	Labor	Gosford	2017–present
Paul Toole	National	Bathurst	2011–present
Wendy Tuckerman	Liberal	Goulburn	2019–present
Gabrielle Upton	Liberal	Vaucluse	2011–2023
Lynda Voltz	Labor	Auburn	2019–present
Gareth Ward (Note: On 14 May 2021, the Liberal member for Kiama, Gareth Ward, resigned from the party and moved to the crossbench to sit as an independent. In March 2022 Ward was suspended from attending parliament, until the conclusion of criminal proceedings against him.)	Liberal/Independent	Kiama	2011–present, currently suspended
Greg Warren	Labor	Campbelltown	2015–present
Kate Washington	Labor	Port Stephens	2015–present
Anna Watson	Labor	Shellharbour	2011–present
Leslie Williams (Note: On 20 September 2020, the member for Port Macquarie, Leslie Williams, resigned from the National Party and joined the Liberal Party.)	National/Liberal	Port Macquarie	2011–2025
Ray Williams	Liberal	Castle Hill	2007–present
Felicity Wilson	Liberal	North Shore	2017–present
Guy Zangari	Labor	Fairfield	2011–2023

== See also ==
- Second Berejiklian ministry
- Results of the 2019 New South Wales state election (Legislative Assembly)
- Candidates of the 2019 New South Wales state election
