= Post-election pendulum for the 2015 New South Wales state election =

The following is a Mackerras pendulum for the 2015 New South Wales state election.

"Safe" seats require a swing of over 10 per cent to change, "fairly safe" seats require a swing of between 6 and 10 per cent, while "marginal" seats require a swing of less than 6 per cent.

All margins are Coalition vs. Labor unless specified otherwise.

Liberal/National seats (54)
Marginal
East Hills	Glenn Brookes	LIB	0.4%
Upper Hunter	Michael Johnsen	NAT	2.2%
Monaro	John Barilaro	NAT	2.5%
Lismore	Thomas George	NAT	2.9 v GRN
Coogee	Bruce Notley-Smith	LIB	2.9%
Tweed	Geoff Provest	NAT	3.2%
Fairly safe
Penrith	Stuart Ayres	LIB	6.2%
Goulburn	Pru Goward	LIB	6.6%
Oatley	Mark Coure	LIB	6.6%
Holsworthy	Melanie Gibbons	LIB	6.7%
Heathcote	Lee Evans	LIB	7.6%
Bega	Andrew Constance	LIB	8.2%
Kiama	Gareth Ward	LIB	8.7%
Seven Hills	Mark Taylor	LIB	8.7%
Myall Lakes	Stephen Bromhead	NAT	8.7%
Terrigal	Adam Crouch	LIB	9.0%
South Coast	Shelley Hancock	LIB	9.6%
Mulgoa	Tanya Davies	LIB	9.7%
Clarence	Chris Gulaptis	NAT	9.7%
Safe
Tamworth	Kevin Anderson	NAT	10.0% v IND
Oxley	Melinda Pavey	NAT	10.9%
Ryde	Victor Dominello	LIB	11.5%
Riverstone	Kevin Conolly	LIB	12.2%
Parramatta	Geoff Lee	LIB	12.9%
Wagga Wagga	Daryl Maguire	LIB	12.9%
Barwon	Kevin Humphries	NAT	12.9%
Miranda	Eleni Petinos	LIB	13.0%
Albury	Greg Aplin	LIB	13.2%
Coffs Harbour	Andrew Fraser	NAT	14.3%
Bathurst	Paul Toole	NAT	15.8%
Epping	Damien Tudehope	LIB	16.2%
Wollondilly	Jai Rowell	LIB	17.3%
Hawkesbury	Dominic Perrottet	LIB	17.8%
Lane Cove	Anthony Roberts	LIB	17.8%
Camden	Chris Patterson	LIB	18.3%
Drummoyne	John Sidoti	LIB	18.8%
Hornsby	Matt Kean	LIB	18.9%
Port Macquarie	Leslie Williams	NAT	19.0%
Cootamundra	Katrina Hodgkinson	NAT	20.4%
Dubbo	Troy Grant	NAT	20.4%
Cronulla	Mark Speakman	LIB	20.9%
North Shore	Jillian Skinner	LIB	21.2% v GRN
Orange	Andrew Gee	NAT	21.7%
Baulkham Hills	David Elliott	LIB	21.8%
Murray	Adrian Piccoli	NAT	22.7% v IND
Vaucluse	Gabrielle Upton	LIB	22.9% v GRN
Ku-ring-gai	Alister Henskens	LIB	23.0%
Willoughby	Gladys Berejiklian	LIB	24.4% v GRN
Manly	Mike Baird	LIB	24.5% v GRN
Wakehurst	Brad Hazzard	LIB	25.2%
Pittwater	Rob Stokes	LIB	25.7% v GRN
Northern Tablelands	Adam Marshall	NAT	27.1%
Davidson	Jonathan O'Dea	LIB	28.8% v GRN
Castle Hill	Ray Williams	LIB	29.4%

Labor seats (34)
Marginal
Gosford	Kathy Smith	ALP	0.2%
The Entrance	David Mehan	ALP	0.4%
Strathfield	Jodi McKay	ALP	1.8%
Granville	Julia Finn	ALP	2.1%
Prospect	Hugh McDermott	ALP	3.4%
Port Stephens	Kate Washington	ALP	4.7%
Rockdale	Steve Kamper	ALP	4.8%
Auburn	Luke Foley	ALP	5.9%
Fairly safe
Kogarah	Chris Minns	ALP	6.9%
Campbelltown	Greg Warren	ALP	7.3%
Newcastle	Tim Crakanthorp	ALP	7.4%
Blue Mountains	Trish Doyle	ALP	8.1%
Macquarie Fields	Anoulack Chanthivong	ALP	8.1%
Wyong	David Harris	ALP	8.7%
Londonderry	Prue Car	ALP	8.8%
Wollongong	Noreen Hay	ALP	8.9% v IND
Safe
Summer Hill	Jo Haylen	ALP	10.5 v GRN
Maroubra	Michael Daley	ALP	10.8%
Charlestown	Jodie Harrison	ALP	12.9%
Swansea	Yasmin Catley	ALP	13.0%
Blacktown	John Robertson	ALP	13.2%
Maitland	Jenny Aitchison	ALP	13.8%
Bankstown	Tania Mihailuk	ALP	14.0%
Heffron	Ron Hoenig	ALP	14.1%
Mount Druitt	Edmond Atalla	ALP	15.4%
Canterbury	Linda Burney	ALP	15.7%
Shellharbour	Anna Watson	ALP	17.0%
Cabramatta	Nick Lalich	ALP	17.2%
Keira	Ryan Park	ALP	17.4%
Fairfield	Guy Zangari	ALP	17.8%
Wallsend	Sonia Hornery	ALP	20.8%
Liverpool	Paul Lynch	ALP	20.9%
Lakemba	Jihad Dib	ALP	21.6%
Cessnock	Clayton Barr	ALP	22.0%
Crossbench seats (5)
Ballina	Tamara Smith	GRN	3.1% v NAT
Balmain	Jamie Parker	GRN	4.7% v ALP
Sydney	Alex Greenwich	IND	8.1 v LIB
Newtown	Jenny Leong	GRN	9.3% v ALP
Lake Macquarie	Greg Piper	IND	10.7 v ALP
