= 2021 New South Wales National Party leadership election =

Australian state political party election

2021 National Party of Australia – NSW leadership election
6 October 2021	2023 →
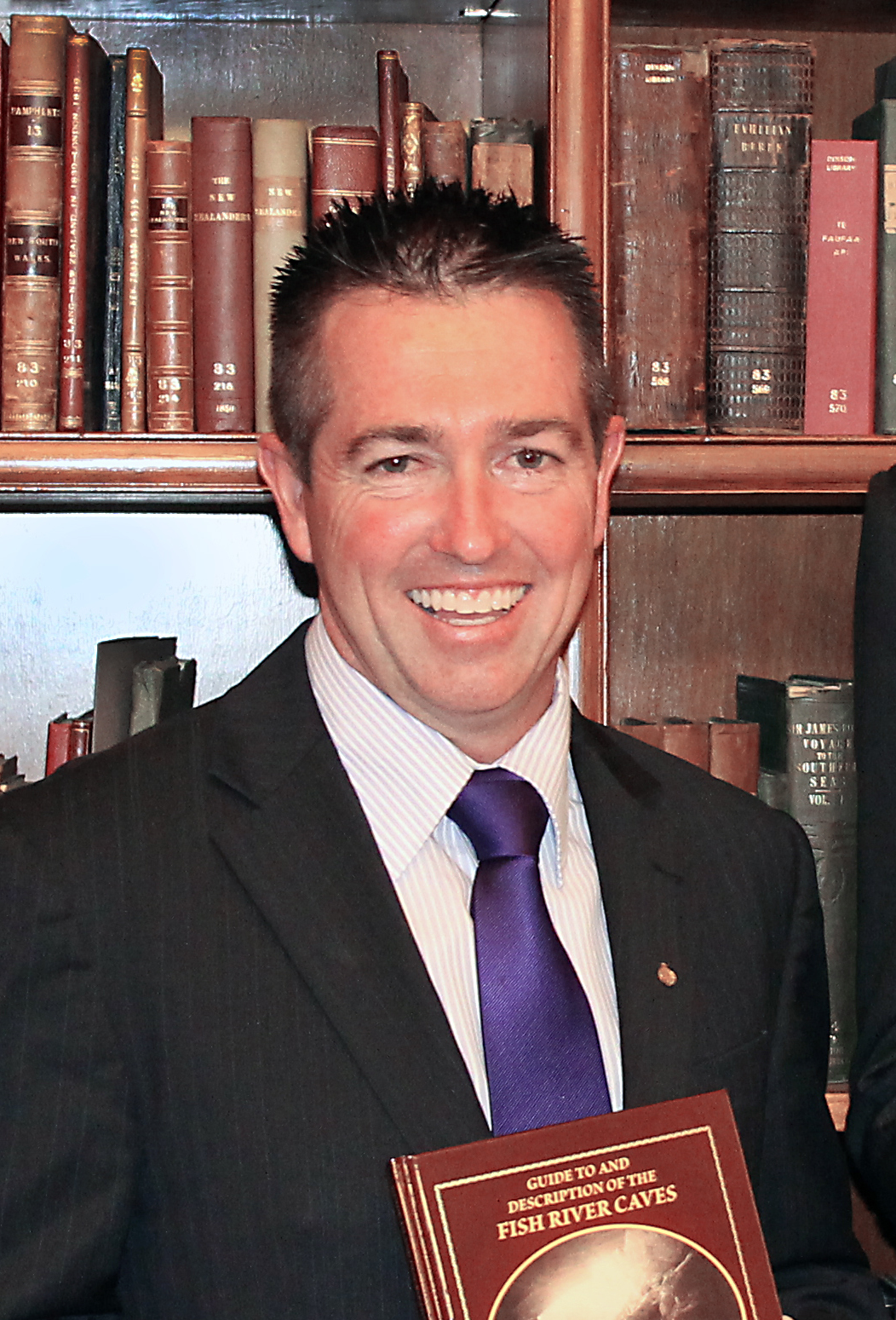

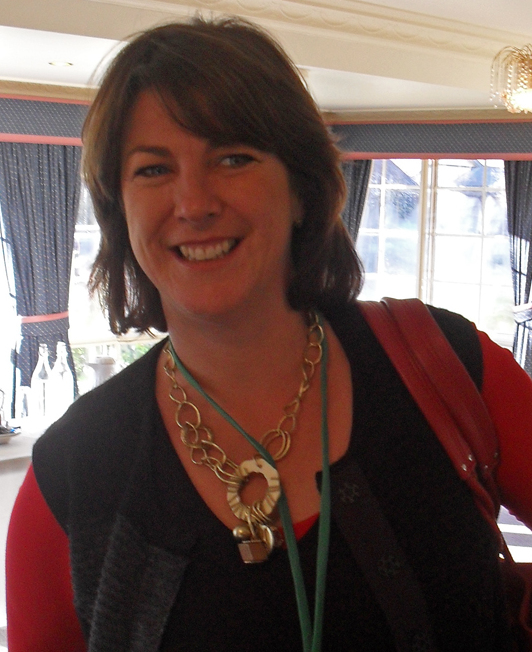
Candidate	Paul Toole	Melinda Pavey
Percentage	83.33%	16.67%
Caucus	15	3
Seat	Bathurst	Oxley
Leader before election
John Barilaro
Elected Leader
Paul Toole

The 2021 leadership election for the National Party of Australia – NSW was held on 6 October 2021 to elect a new leader of the New South Wales Division of the National Party of Australia and subsequently the Deputy Premier of New South Wales, following the resignation of John Barilaro. The election was conducted among the National Party members of the Parliament of New South Wales and contested between Melinda Pavey and Paul Toole. Toole won the election 15 to 3. Bronnie Taylor was elected as deputy party leader, unopposed.

A separate leadership ballot for the National Party's coalition partner, the New South Wales Liberals, was held the day before.

== Background ==
Incumbent leader and deputy premier John Barilaro announced his resignation on 4 October, just days after the announcement of Gladys Berejiklian's pending resignation from the leadership of the Liberal Party of Australia (New South Wales Division) and her tenure as Premier of New South Wales. In a press conference, Barilaro said the decision to resign was for the state to have a "new beginning". Barilaro's time as Deputy Premier has seen the Nationals break off from the coalition agreement between themselves and the Liberal Party of Australia briefly, while Barilaro himself has previously indicated a desire to contest for the Division of Eden-Monaro in the Parliament of Australia which did not eventuate. Barilaro had served as the deputy premier since 2016, succeeding the previous leader Troy Grant.

== Candidates ==
=== Declared ===
- Melinda Pavey, Minister for Water, Property and Housing
List of Melinda Pavey endorsements

Celebrities and Media Personalities

- Ray Hadley, Talkback radio broadcaster (2GB)
- Paul Toole, Deputy Leader of the New South Wales National Party of Australia and Minister for Regional Transport and Roads

=== Declined ===
- Adam Marshall, Minister for Agriculture and Western New South Wales

== See also ==
- John Barilaro
- 2023 New South Wales state election
- 2021 Australian Labor Party (New South Wales Branch) leadership election
- 2021 Liberal Party of Australia (New South Wales Division) leadership election
