= Crosby v Kelly =

Legal case heard in the Federal Court of Australia

- Court: Full Court of the Federal Court of Australia
- Citation: (2012) 203 FCR 451; [2012] FCAFC 96

Case history
- Subsequent actions: Special leave to High Court denied [2013] HCATrans 17; Case withdrawn on retrial in Federal Court

Keywords
- Defamation, jurisdiction of Federal Court

Crosby v Kelly is an important Federal Court of Australia case concerning the jurisdiction of the court to hear defamation claims. The judgment of the Full Court confirmed that the Court has original jurisdiction to hear defamation claims that could be heard by a Territory court, specifically the Supreme Court of the Australian Capital Territory. The consequence of this is that almost any defamatory comment made on the Internet and in the national press could be brought before the Federal Court.

== Background ==
=== Legal background ===
When hearing a claim between two private parties, the Federal Court of Australia can usually only hear claims that arise under federal laws or the Australian Constitution. As such, the court does not normally have jurisdiction over claims solely alleging damages under common law torts like defamation. Before Crosby, the only way a defamation claim could be brought before the court was where the defendant sought to bring a defence under a federal law (or the Constitution) or where the plaintiff brought the defamation claim in addition to claims made under federal laws, in which case the court is sitting in its "accrued jurisdiction".

The Australian Capital Territory (Self-Government) Act 1988 provides, at section 48AA, that a law of the ACT Legislative Assembly can confer concurrent jurisdiction over Territory law matters. The Jurisdiction of Courts (Cross-vesting) Act 1987 (Cth) and its corresponding law in the Australian Capital Territory allow the Federal Court of Australia to hear matters over which the Supreme Court has jurisdiction.

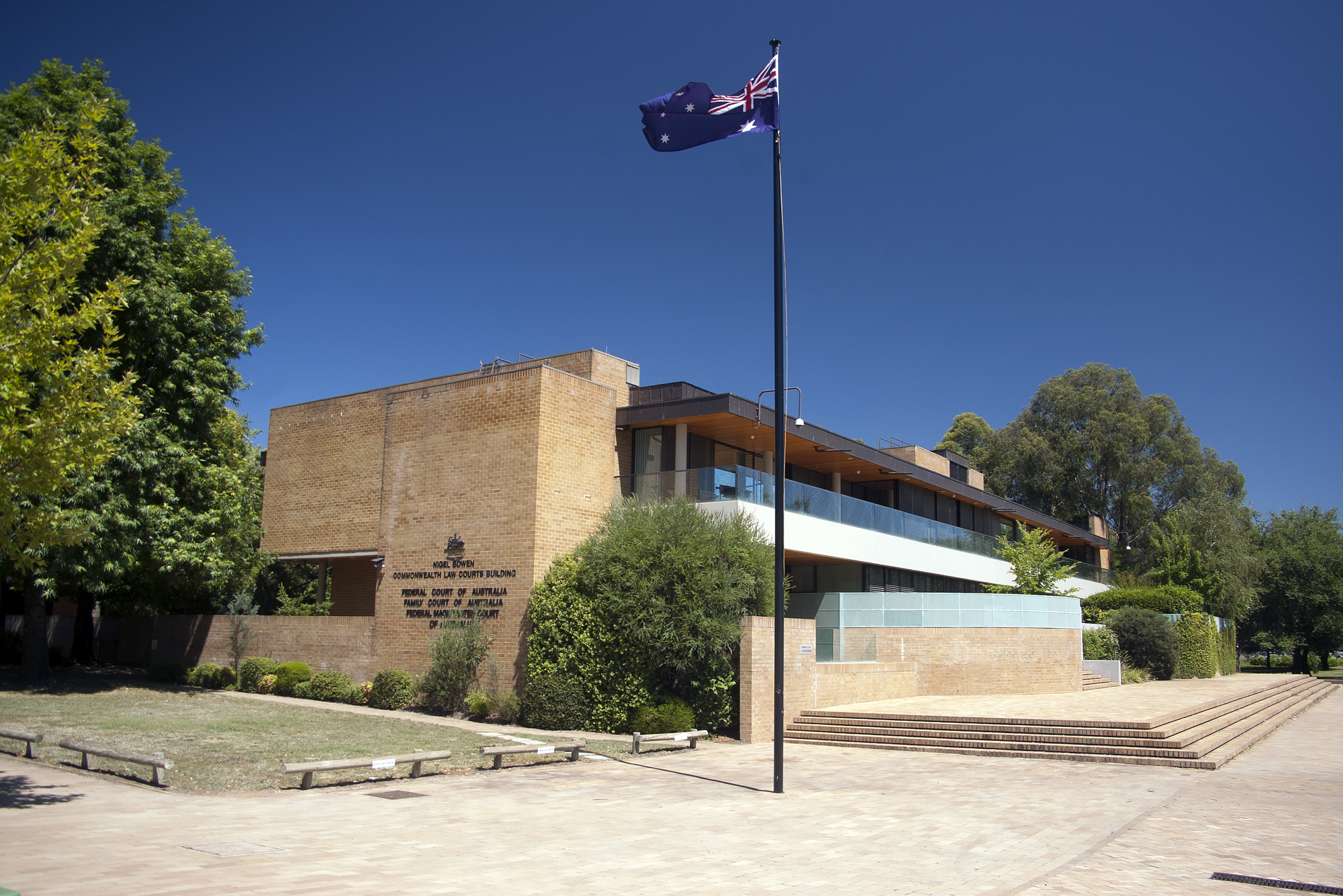
The Nigel Bowen Building in Acton, pictured in 2011, which houses Australian Capital Territory registry of the Federal Court where the case was filed.

The Federal Court has long had jurisdiction to hear matters arising under specific statutes made for the Australian Capital Territory, usually by the Australian Parliament under section 122 of the Constitution. From the Federal Court's establishment in 1976 until 2002, the court served as the territory's appellate court. In 1999, the High Court of Australia held in Spinks v Prentice, which was heard together with Re Wakim; ex parte McNally, that the Federal Court had jurisdiction to hear matters arising under the Corporations Law of the Australian Capital Territory, but not the separate corporations laws of the States.

By the 2000s, the Federal Court began to hear cases arising under the Territory's common law, rather than statutes made for it.

In 2000, Justice Finn of the Federal Court held, in O'Neill v Mann, that a provision in the Jurisdiction of Courts Act allowing matters to be transferred from the ACT Supreme Court to the Federal Court was valid. The O'Neill case concerned a defamation matter for which no Supreme Court judges were available due to disqualification and, unlike Crosby, was not initiated in the Federal Court.

In 2002, the High Court held, in Dow Jones & Co Inc v Gutnick, that an Australian court has jurisdiction to hear a defamation claim relating to online publications where the publication is "downloaded and read" by someone in the jurisdiction.

=== Facts and arguments ===
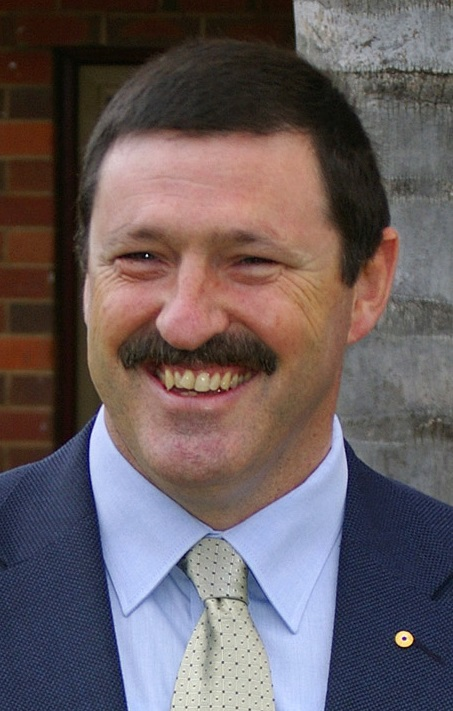
Mike Kelly, pictured here in 2008, was the defendant in this case

The plaintiffs, campaign strategists Lynton Crosby and Mark Textor, brought the case in response to a tweet accusing the pair of "push polling" posted by the defendant, Dr Mike Kelly. Kelly was the Member for Eden-Monaro in the House of Representatives and a parliamentary secretary in the Gillard ministry at the time. The plaintiffs argued that the tweet was likely to have been seen by Kelly's followers including people within the Australian Capital Territory.

The case was a "pure" defamation case, in the sense that the plaintiffs did not allege a breach of a federal law. Although none of the plaintiffs, nor the defendant, lived in the Australian Capital Territory, the plaintiffs stated their claim under the defamation law of the Territory. Kelly chose not to rely on defences relating to his parliamentary privilege or on a constitutional defence (such as the Lange defence) which would have more readily attracted the Federal Court's jurisdiction, instead arguing that the court did not have jurisdiction over the case.

The Attorneys-General of the Australian Capital Territory and the Northern Territory joined the case as interveners.

== Decision ==
Robertson J's judgment, the longest one with which the rest of the panel agreed, found that civil cases arising under the laws of the Australian Capital Territory were within the Federal Court's statutory jurisdiction even where the law was a common law rule rather than a statute. In other words, due to the Jurisdiction of Courts Act, the common law of the Australian Capital Territory is picked up as a law of the Commonwealth.

Perram J's judgment expanded on Robertson's points by constructing the Jurisdiction of Courts Act as a "surrogate" federal law which Territory matters can arise under for the purposes of Chapter III of the Constitution.

== Aftermath ==
Kelly sought leave to appeal the decision to the High Court. The Court heard oral arguments in April 2013, immediately dismissing the appeal. The case returned to the Federal Court where Kelly had several defences struck out. The case continued for another two years before, in July 2015, Kelly apologised to the plaintiffs and the plaintiffs withdrew the case.

The main consequence of Crosby is that a plaintiff can now choose whether to bring their cases before the Federal Court in defamation cases involving social media or mass media that is likely to have been seen in an Australian territory. Post-Crosby, several prominent defamation cases have been brought before the Court including Barilaro v Shanks-Markovina, Dutton v Bazzi, the defamation cases brought by Ben Roberts-Smith against Fairfax Media, and the case brought by Geoffrey Rush against the Daily Telegraph.

Another consequence relates to jury trials in defamation cases. The Federal Court's enabling legislation severely limits the availability of juries in civil trials brought before it, whereas most state defamation laws allow parties to a defamation case to request that the matter be heard by a jury. (Note: In South Australia and the Australian Capital Territory, jury trials in all civil matters have been abolished.) A plaintiff in a State with civil jury trials may choose to bring a case before the Federal Court in order to avoid facing a jury, because the Federal Court limits the use of juries to exceptional circumstances.

Procedure in the Federal Court also differs greatly from the State and Territory courts. The Federal Court has a greater preference for written affidavits and submissions over oral evidence which may allow plaintiffs to control the conduct of the case.
