= Minister for Gaming and Racing =

Cabinet position in New South Wales

- Incumbent; David Harris since 5 April 2023
- Department of Creative Industries, Tourism, Hospitality and Sport
- Style: The Honourable
- Nominator: Premier of New South Wales
- Appointer: Governor of New South Wales
- Inaugural holder: Michael Cleary (as Minister for Racing)
- Formation: 4 July 1986

The New South Wales Minister for Gaming and Racing is a minister in the Government of New South Wales with responsibilities for the oversight of hospitality and for racing in the state of New South Wales, Australia.

== Role and responsibilities ==
Racing became a portfolio for the first time in the Unsworth ministry. The minister was responsible for regulating bookmakers and the control of greyhound, trotting and horse racing, racecourse development and the management of the NSW Totalisator Agency Board. With the establishment of the Sydney Harbour Casino in 1995, the portfolio included the Casino Control Board. The portfolio was abolished in the Second Berejiklian ministry and responsibility shared by the Minister for Customer Service and the Minister for Better Regulation and Innovation, before being re-established in the second Perrottet ministry. In addition to racing and gambling, the minister is also responsible for registered clubs.

== List of ministers ==
The following individuals have served as Minister for Gaming and Racing, or any precedent title:

Ministerial title	Minister	Party	Ministry	Term start	Term end	Time in office	Notes
Minister for Racing	Michael Cleary	Labor	Unsworth	4 July 1986	21 March 1988	1 year, 261 days	
Minister for Sport, Recreation and Racing	Bob Rowland Smith	National	Greiner (1)	25 March 1988	18 September 1989	3 years, 60 days	
Minister for Racing (Note: The portfolio of Racing was separated from Sport and Recreation however Bob Rowland Smith retained responsibility for both portfolios.)	Bob Rowland Smith	National	Greiner (1)	18 September 1989	24 May 1991	3 years, 60 days	
Minister for Sport, Recreation and Racing	George Souris	National	Greiner (2); Fahey (1)	6 June 1991	24 June 1992	1 year, 18 days	
Minister for Sport, Recreation and Racing	Joe Schipp	Liberal	Fahey (2)	3 July 1992	26 May 1993	327 days	
Minister for Sport, Recreation and Racing	Chris Downy	Liberal	Fahey (3)	26 May 1993	4 April 1995	1 year, 313 days	
Minister for Gaming and Racing	Richard Face	Labor	Carr (1) (2) (3)	4 April 1995	13 February 2003	7 years, 315 days	
Minister for Gaming and Racing	Michael Egan	Labor	Carr (3)	13 February 2003	2 April 2003	48 days	
Minister for Gaming and Racing	Grant McBride	Labor	Carr (4); Iemma (1)	2 April 2003	2 April 2007	4 years, 0 days	
Minister for Gaming and Racing	Graham West	Labor	Iemma (2)	2 April 2007	8 September 2008	1 year, 159 days	
Minister for Gaming and Racing	Kevin Greene	Labor	Rees; Keneally	8 September 2008	28 March 2011	2 years, 201 days	
Minister for Tourism, Major Events, Hospitality and Racing	George Souris	National	O'Farrell	4 April 2011	23 April 2014	3 years, 19 days	
Minister for Hospitality, Gaming and Racing	Troy Grant	National	Baird (1)	23 April 2014	2 April 2015	2 years, 282 days	
Minister for Racing	Troy Grant	National	Baird (2)	2 April 2015	30 January 2017	2 years, 282 days	
Minister for Racing	Paul Toole	National	Berejiklian (1)	30 January 2017	23 March 2019	2 years, 52 days	
Minister for Hospitality and Racing	Kevin Anderson	National	Perrottet (2)	21 December 2021	28 March 2023	1 year, 97 days	
Minister for Transport	Jo Haylen	Labor	Minns	28 March 2023	5 April 2023	8 days	
Minister for Gaming and Racing	David Harris	Labor	Minns	5 April 2023	incumbent	3 years, 155 days	

== See also ==
- List of New South Wales government agencies
