= Berejiklian ministry =

Berejiklian ministry may refer to:

- First Berejiklian ministry, 96th ministry of the New South Wales government
- Second Berejiklian ministry, 97th ministry of the New South Wales government
