= Minister for Lands and Property =

Government minister in the colony of New South Wales

Minister for Lands and Property of New South Wales
- Incumbent; Steve Kamper since 5 April 2023
- Department of Planning, Housing and Infrastructure
- Appointer: Governor of New South Wales
- Precursor: Secretary for Lands and Works
- Formation: 1 October 1859
- First holder: Bob Nichols

The Minister for Lands and Property, also called the Secretary for Lands was responsible for one of the key issues for the colonial administration of New South Wales, being the contest between squatters and selectors to dispossess the Aboriginal people of their land.

== Role and responsibilities ==
The land issue dominated the politics of the late 1850s, and in October 1859, towards the end of the second Cowper ministry, the Secretary for Public Works was split off from the Secretary for Lands and Works. This enabled John Robertson to concentrate on what became known as the Robertson Land Acts. The Cowper ministry fell at the end of October 1859, replaced by the short lived Forster ministry. Robertson formed his first ministry in March 1860. While the four previous Premiers held the office of Colonial Secretary, Robertson chose to be Secretary for Lands.

The main work of the department at this time was processing the selection claims, including the various commissioners for Crown Lands and the necessary survey work under the Surveyor General. The minister had numerous other responsibilities, including immigration until 1869, mining until 1874 and forestry until 1908.

In the Holman Nationalist ministry from November 1916 William Ashford held the portfolios of Secretary for Lands and Minister for Forests and it became increasingly common for the minister to hold the portfolio along with other portfolios. In 1981 the Department of lands was temporarily amalgamated with the Department of Local Government, with the minister Lin Gordon holding both portfolios, until the departments were separated again in February 1984. The portfolio of Minister for Lands was abolished in April 1984 and replaced by the Minister for Natural Resources whose responsibilities included waterways, reserves and parks, forestry. The portfolio was briefly re-established in 1986, 1990 and 2004.

== List of ministers ==
=== Lands ===
Ministerial title	Minister	Party	Term start	Term end	Time in office	Notes
Secretary for Lands and Works	George Nichols	No party	6 June 1856	25 August 1856	80 days	
Secretary for Lands and Works	Terence Murray	No party	25 August 1856	2 October 1856	38 days	
Secretary for Lands and Works	John Hay	No party	3 October 1856	7 September 1857	339 days	
Secretary for Lands and Works	Terence Murray	No party	7 September 1857	12 January 1858	127 days	
Secretary for Lands and Works	John Robertson	No party	13 January 1858	30 September 1859	1 year, 286 days	
Secretary for Lands	John Robertson	No party	1 October 1859	26 October 1859	1 year, 286 days	
Secretary for Lands	John Black	No party	27 October 1859	8 March 1860	133 days	
Secretary for Lands	John Robertson (Note: Concurrently Premier of New South Wales until 9 January 1861.)	No party	9 March 1860	15 October 1863	3 years, 220 days	
Secretary for Lands	Bowie Wilson	No party	16 October 1863	2 February 1865	1 year, 109 days	
Secretary for Lands	John Robertson	No party	3 February 1865	19 October 1865	258 days	
Secretary for Lands	William Arnold	No party	20 October 1865	30 October 1865	10 days	
Secretary for Lands	John Robertson	No party	1 January 1866	21 January 1866	20 days	
Secretary for Lands	Bowie Wilson	No party	22 January 1866	26 October 1868	2 years, 278 days	
Secretary for Lands	William Forster	No party	27 October 1868	14 April 1870	1 year, 169 days	
Secretary for Lands	John Robertson	No party	13 August 1870	15 December 1870	124 days	
Secretary for Lands	Bowie Wilson	No party	16 December 1870	13 May 1872	1 year, 149 days	
Secretary for Lands	James Farnell	No party	14 May 1872	8 February 1875	2 years, 270 days	
Secretary for Lands	Thomas Garrett	No party	9 February 1875	5 February 1877	1 year, 362 days	
Secretary for Lands	Ezekiel Baker	No party	6 February 1877	21 March 1877	43 days	
Secretary for Lands	Richard Driver	No party	22 March 1877	16 August 1877	147 days	
Secretary for Lands	Thomas Garrett	No party	17 August 1877	19 November 1877	94 days	
Secretary for Lands	Ezekiel Baker	No party	20 November 1877	17 December 1877	27 days	
Secretary for Lands	James Farnell	No party	18 December 1877	20 December 1878	1 year, 2 days	
Secretary for Lands	James Hoskins	No party	21 December 1878	28 December 1881	3 years, 7 days	
Secretary for Lands	Sir John Robertson	No party	29 December 1881	4 January 1883	1 year, 6 days	
Secretary for Lands	James Farnell	No party	5 January 1883	6 October 1885	2 years, 274 days	
Secretary for Lands	Joseph Abbott	No party	7 October 1885	21 December 1885	75 days	
Secretary for Lands	Gerald Spring	No party	22 December 1885	25 February 1886	65 days	
Secretary for Lands	Henry Copeland	No party	26 February 1886	19 January 1887	327 days	
Secretary for Lands	Thomas Garrett	Free Trade	20 January 1887	19 January 1888	364 days	
Secretary for Lands	Sir Henry Parkes	Free Trade	26 July 1888	23 August 1888	28 days	
Secretary for Lands	James Brunker	Free Trade	29 August 1888	16 January 1889	140 days	
Secretary for Lands	William Lyne	Protectionist	17 January 1889	7 March 1889	49 days	
Secretary for Lands	James Brunker	Free Trade	8 March 1889	22 October 1891	2 years, 228 days	
Secretary for Lands	Henry Copeland	Protectionist	23 October 1891	2 August 1894	2 years, 283 days	
Secretary for Lands	Joseph Carruthers	Free Trade	3 August 1894	3 July 1899	4 years, 334 days	
Secretary for Lands	James Young	Free Trade	3 July 1899	13 September 1899	72 days	
Secretary for Lands	Thomas Hassall	Protectionist	14 September 1899	9 April 1901	1 year, 207 days	
Secretary for Lands	Paddy Crick	Progressive	11 April 1901	14 June 1904	3 years, 64 days	
Secretary for Lands	Edward O'Sullivan	Progressive	15 June 1904	29 August 1904	75 days	
Secretary for Lands	James Ashton	Liberal Reform	29 August 1904	1 October 1907	3 years, 33 days	
Secretary for Lands	Samuel Moore	Liberal Reform	2 October 1907	20 October 1910	3 years, 18 days	
Secretary for Lands	Niels Nielsen	Labor	21 October 1910	1 August 1911	284 days	
Secretary for Lands	Frederick Flowers	Labor	4 August 1911	26 November 1911	114 days	
Secretary for Lands	George Beeby	Labor	11 September 1911	9 December 1912	1 year, 89 days	
Secretary for Lands	John Treflé	Labor	10 December 1912	11 January 1915	2 years, 32 days	
Secretary for Lands	William Ashford	Labor	12 January 1915	15 November 1916	1 year, 308 days	
Secretary for Lands	William Ashford	Nationalist	15 November 1916	12 April 1920	3 years, 149 days	
Secretary for Lands; Minister for Forests	Peter Loughlin	Labor	12 April 1920	20 December 1921	1 year, 252 days	
Secretary for Lands; Minister for Forests	Walter Wearne	Nationalist	20 December 1921	20 December 1921	7 hours	
Secretary for Lands; Minister for Forests	Peter Loughlin	Labor	20 December 1921	13 April 1922	114 days	
Secretary for Lands; Minister for Forests	Walter Wearne	Nationalist	13 April 1922	17 June 1925	3 years, 65 days	
Secretary for Lands; Minister for Forests	Peter Loughlin	Labor	17 June 1925	19 November 1926	1 year, 155 days	
Secretary for Lands; Minister for Forests	Jack Lang	Labor	25 November 1926	26 May 1927	182 days	
Secretary for Lands; Minister for Forests	Ted Horsington	Labor	27 May 1927	18 October 1927	144 days	
Minister for Lands	Richard Ball	Nationalist	18 October 1927	3 November 1930	3 years, 16 days	
Secretary for Lands	Jack Tully	Labor	4 November 1930	15 October 1931	345 days	
Secretary for Lands	Jack Tully	Labor (NSW)	15 October 1931	13 May 1932	211 days	
Secretary for Lands	Ernest Buttenshaw	Country	16 May 1932	31 January 1938	5 years, 260 days	
Secretary for Lands	Colin Sinclair	Country	1 February 1938	6 November 1940	2 years, 279 days	
Secretary for Lands	Alfred Yeo	Country	6 November 1940	16 May 1941	191 days	
Secretary for Lands	Jack Tully	Labor	16 May 1941	9 May 1946	4 years, 358 days	
Secretary for Lands	Bill Dunn	Labor	9 May 1946	19 May 1947	1 year, 10 days	
Secretary for Lands	Bill Sheahan	Labor	19 May 1947	30 June 1950	3 years, 42 days	
Secretary for Lands	Jack Renshaw	Labor	30 June 1950	2 April 1952	1 year, 277 days	
Secretary for Lands	Frank Hawkins	Labor	3 April 1952	15 March 1956	3 years, 347 days	
Secretary for Lands	Roger Nott	Labor	15 March 1956	22 November 1957	1 year, 252 days	
Secretary for Lands	William Gollan	Labor	22 November 1957	1 April 1959	1 year, 130 days	
Minister for Lands	John McMahon	Labor	1 April 1959	31 May 1960	1 year, 60 days	
Minister for Lands	Jack Renshaw	Labor	31 May 1960	3 March 1961	276 days	
Minister for Lands	Keith Compton	Labor	3 March 1961	13 May 1965	4 years, 71 days	
Minister for Lands	Tom Lewis	Liberal	13 May 1965	3 January 1975	9 years, 235 days	
Minister for Lands; Minister for Forests	Milton Morris	Liberal	3 January 1975	30 June 1975	178 days	
Minister for Lands; Minister for Forests	John Mason	Liberal	30 June 1975	23 January 1976	207 days	
Minister for Lands; Minister for Forests	Col Fisher	Country	23 January 1976	14 May 1976	112 days	
Minister for Lands	Bill Crabtree	Labor	14 May 1976	29 February 1980	3 years, 291 days	
Minister for Lands; Minister for Forests; Minister for Water Resources	Lin Gordon	Labor	29 February 1980	5 April 1984	4 years, 65 days	
Minister for Lands	Jack Hallam	Labor	4 July 1986	21 March 1988	1 year, 261 days	
Minister for Lands and Forests	Garry West	National	24 July 1990	6 June 1991	2 years, 306 days	
Minister for Conservation and Land Management	Garry West	National	6 June 1991	26 May 1993	2 years, 306 days	
Minister for Land and Water Conservation	George Souris	National	26 May 1993	4 April 1995	1 year, 313 days	
Minister for Land and Water Conservation	Kim Yeadon	Labor	4 April 1995	1 December 1997	2 years, 241 days	
Minister for Land and Water Conservation	Richard Amery	Labor	1 December 1997	21 November 2001	3 years, 355 days	
Minister for Land and Water Conservation	John Aquilina	Labor	21 November 2001	2 April 2003	1 year, 132 days	
Minister Assisting the Minister for Natural Resources (Lands)	Tony Kelly	Labor	2 April 2003	3 May 2004	7 years, 360 days	
Minister for Lands	Tony Kelly	Labor	3 May 2004	28 March 2011	7 years, 360 days	
Minister for Natural Resources, Lands and Water	Kevin Humphries	National	23 April 2014	2 April 2015	344 days	
Minister for Lands and Water	Niall Blair	National	2 April 2015	30 January 2017	1 year, 303 days	
Minister for Lands and Forestry	Paul Toole	National	30 January 2017	23 March 2019	2 years, 52 days	
Minister for Lands and Water	Kevin Anderson	National	21 December 2021	28 March 2023	1 year, 97 days	
Minister for Transport	Jo Haylen	Labor	28 March 2023	5 April 2023	8 days	
Minister for Lands and Property	Steve Kamper	Labor	5 April 2023	incumbent	3 years, 227 days	

=== Property ===
Ministerial title	Minister	Party	Term start	Term end	Time in office	Notes
Minister for Finance, Services and Property	Dominic Perrottet	Liberal	2 April 2015	30 January 2017	1 year, 303 days	
Minister for Finance, Services and Property	Victor Dominello	Liberal	30 January 2017	23 February 2019	2 years, 24 days	
Minister for Water, Property and Housing	Melinda Pavey	National	2 April 2019	21 December 2021	2 years, 263 days	
Minister for Transport	Jo Haylen	Labor	28 March 2023	5 April 2023	8 days	
Minister for Lands and Property	Steve Kamper	Labor	5 April 2023	incumbent	3 years, 227 days	
