= Niall Blair =

Australian politician (born 1977)

The Honourable Niall Blair
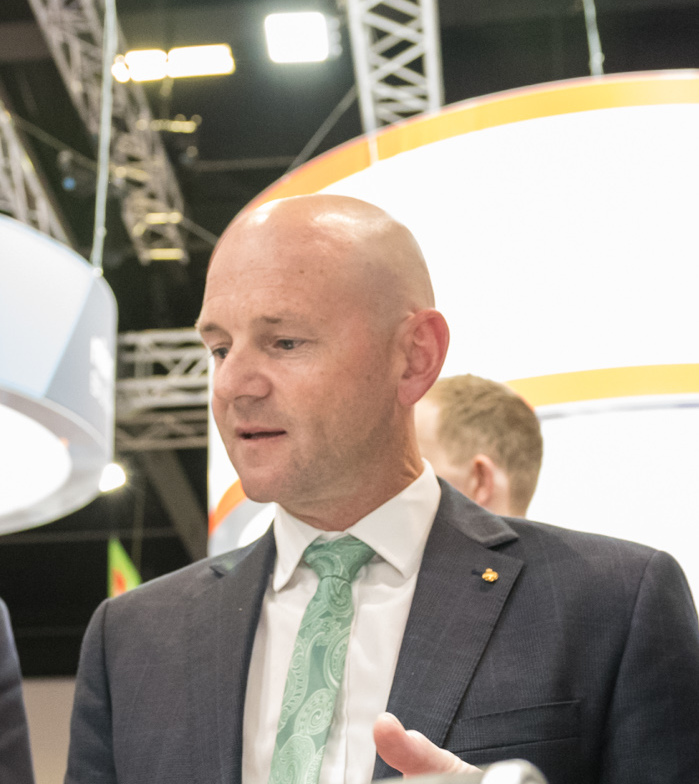
- Blair at the CeBIT VIP Tour Minister for Primary Industries in 2018

Minister for Primary Industries
- In office 2 April 2015 – 2 April 2019
- Premier: Mike Baird; Gladys Berejiklian
- Preceded by: Katrina Hodgkinson
- Succeeded by: Adam Marshall (as Minister for Agriculture)

Minister for Trade and Industry
- In office 30 January 2017 – 2 April 2019
- Premier: Gladys Berejiklian
- Preceded by: Stuart Ayres (as Minister for Trade, Tourism and Major Events)
- Succeeded by: John Barilaro (as Minister for Regional New South Wales, Industry and Trade

Minister for Regional Water
- In office 30 January 2017 – 23 March 2019
- Premier: Gladys Berejiklian
- Preceded by: himself (as Minister for Lands and Water)
- Succeeded by: Melinda Pavey (as Minister for Water, Property and Housing)

Minister for Lands and Water
- In office 2 April 2015 – 30 January 2017
- Premier: Mike Baird
- Preceded by: Katrina Hodgkinson
- Succeeded by: himself (as Minister for Regional Water); Paul Toole (as Minister for Lands and Forestry)

Deputy Leader of the New South Wales National Party
- In office 15 November 2016 – 2 April 2019
- Preceded by: Adrian Piccoli
- Succeeded by: Paul Toole

Deputy Leader of the Government in the Legislative Council
- In office 31 January 2017 – 2 April 2019
- Preceded by: John Ajaka
- Succeeded by: Sarah Mitchell

Member of the New South Wales Legislative Council
- In office 26 March 2011 – 16 October 2019
- Succeeded by: Sam Farraway

Personal details
- Born: 22 May 1977 (age 49) Goulburn, New South Wales, Australia
- Party: Independent
- Other political affiliations: The Nationals (Until 2020)
- Education: University of Western Sydney; University of Newcastle

Niall Mark Blair (born 22 May 1977) is a former Australian politician and served as the Deputy Leader of the New South Wales Nationals from November 2016 until October 2019. Blair was a Nationals member of the New South Wales Legislative Council from March 2011 until October 2019, when he retired from politics. Blair is currently the chair of the board of Sydney Water Corporation since October 2024.

He was the New South Wales Minister for Primary Industries from April 2015 until March 2019; the Minister for Trade and Industry and the Minister for Regional Water from January 2017 until March 2019 in the Berejiklian government.

== Biography ==
Blair graduated with a Bachelor of Applied Science from the University of Western Sydney in 1997. He was a tree management officer with Marrickville Council from 1998 until 1999 and manager of parks and recreation for Leeton Shire from 1999 until 2005. He attained a masters in occupational health and safety from the University of Newcastle in 2005, and subsequently worked as manager of technical training for Integral Energy from 2005 until 2006. He founded a Moss Vale workplace safety consultancy, Admire Workplace Safety, in 2006 and was its CEO until his election to parliament in 2011.

Blair has been the chairman of the Nationals' Goulburn State Electoral Council since 2008, and was the vice-chairman of the Hume Federal Electoral Council from 2009 until 2010. He was preselected in April 2010 as the tenth candidate on the Coalition Legislative Council ticket, and was easily elected in March 2011 as the Coalition swept to a near-record landslide victory.

Following the 2015 state election, Blair was sworn in as the Minister for Primary Industries and the Minister for Lands and Water in the second Baird government. In January 2017 Blair was sworn in as the Minister for Primary Industries, the Minister for Trade and Industry, and the Minister for Regional Water in the Berejiklian government.

Blair was re-elected to the Legislative Council at the 2019 state election on 23 March, but the next day announced his resignation from the Cabinet, and from the Legislative Council when a replacement could be found. After the Nationals confirmed Sam Farraway as a replacement in September, Blair resigned from the Legislative Council on 16 October 2019.

Blair did not renew his National Party membership in 2020.

== See also ==
- Second Baird ministry
- Berejiklian ministry

Parliament of New South Wales
Political offices
Preceded by Katrina Hodgkinson	Minister for Lands and Water; 2015–2017	Succeeded by Himself as Minister for Regional Water
Preceded by Katrina Hodgkinson	Minister for Lands and Water; 2015–2017	Succeeded by Paul Toole as Minister for Lands and Forestry
Preceded by Katrina Hodgkinson	Minister for Primary Industries; 2015–2019	Succeeded by Adam Marshall as Minister for Agriculture
Preceded by Himself as Minister for Lands and Water	Minister for Regional Water; 2017–2019	Succeeded by Melinda Pavey as Minister for Water, Property and Housing
Preceded by Stuart Ayres as Minister for Trade, Tourism and Major Events	Minister for Trade and Industry; 2017–2019	Succeeded by John Barilaro as Minister for Regional New South Wales, Industry and Trade
Party political offices
Preceded by Adrian Piccoli	Deputy Leader of the Nationals; 2016–2019	Succeeded by Paul Toole
Preceded by John Ajaka	Deputy Leader of the Government in the Legislative Council; 2017–2019	Succeeded by Sarah Mitchell
Government offices
Preceded by Grant King	Chair of Sydney Water; 2024–present	Incumbent
