= Melinda Pavey =

Australian politician (born 1969)

The Honourable Melinda Pavey
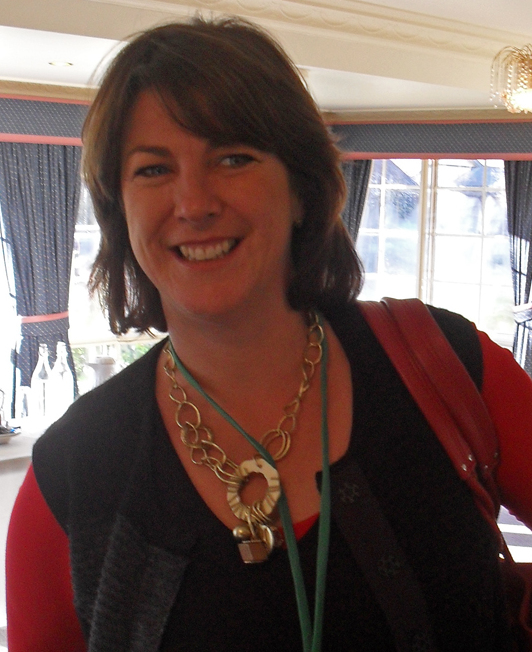

Minister for Water, Property and Housing
- In office 2 April 2019 – 21 December 2021
- Premier: Gladys Berejiklian; Dominic Perrottet
- Preceded by: Niall Blair (as Minister for Regional Water); Victor Dominello (as Minister for Finance, Services and Property); Anthony Roberts (as Minister for Housing)
- Succeeded by: Kevin Anderson (as Minister for Lands and Water); Anthony Roberts (as Minister for Homes)

Minister for Roads, Maritime and Freight
- In office 30 January 2017 – 2 April 2019
- Premier: Gladys Berejiklian
- Preceded by: Duncan Gay
- Succeeded by: Paul Toole (as Minister for Regional Roads and Transport); Andrew Constance (as Minister for Roads and Transport)

Member of the New South Wales Legislative Assembly for Oxley
- In office 28 March 2015 – 25 March 2023
- Preceded by: Andrew Stoner
- Succeeded by: Michael Kemp

Member of the New South Wales Legislative Council
- In office 3 September 2002 – 6 March 2015
- Preceded by: Doug Moppett

Personal details
- Born: Melinda Jane Shaw; 1969 (age 56–57)
- Party: National
- Spouse: Warren Pavey
- Children: 2
- Occupation: Reporter; Businessperson; Politician
- Website: melindapavey.com.au

Melinda Jane Pavey (née Shaw; born 1969), is a former Australian politician. Pavey had been a member of the New South Wales Legislative Assembly from 2015 to 2023, representing the seat of Oxley for The Nationals. She was previously a member of the New South Wales Legislative Council between 2002 and 2015.

Pavey had previously served as the Minister for Roads, Maritime and Freight from January 2017 until March 2019 in the first Berejiklian ministry government. She was the Minister for Water, Property and Housing from 2019 to 2023 in the second Berejiklian ministry and the Perrottet ministry.

A former party staffer, the Coffs Harbour businesswoman became the party's youngest New South Wales member of parliament at the age of 33.

She stood down at the 2023 New South Wales state election, and was succeeded by fellow National candidate Michael Kemp.

== Career ==
Pavey initially worked as a radio journalist with 2UW in Sydney, but soon became involved in the National Party, and in 1988 took up a position as a media officer for Matt Singleton, the then-Minister for Administrative Services. Over the next decade, she worked for a number of MPs, including Deputy Premier Wal Murray (1990–1993), Minister for Consumer Affairs Wendy Machin (1993–1994) and National Party leader Ian Armstrong (1994–1997).

Pavey entered politics in July 2002, when long-serving Legislative Council member Doug Moppett died suddenly. In the subsequent weeks, Pavey announced her intention to nominate for the resulting casual vacancy. At the time, the party was recovering from a significant defeat at the 2001 election, and the party was keen to look for younger and more appealing candidates. Despite being nine months pregnant at the time, Pavey was ultimately successful in obtaining preselection, and was sworn in as an MLC in September 2002, three weeks after the birth of her daughter, Emily.

She has dedicated much of her time to advocating for the people of the Queanbeyan region, in her role as The Nationals duty member for the Labor-held Legislative Assembly electorate of Monaro. She has also served on the Parliamentary Committee on Children and Young People since 2003.

After the 2011 state election, Premier Barry O'Farrell announced that Pavey would not enter Cabinet; despite previously holding the role of Shadow spokesperson for Emergency Services. Pavey was subsequently appointed Parliamentary Secretary for Regional Health. In December 2014, Pavey was preselected by the Nationals as the party's candidate for the lower house seat of Oxley at the 2015 state election.

Following the resignation of Mike Baird as Premier, Gladys Berejiklian was elected as Liberal leader and sworn in as Premier. The Berejiklian ministry was subsequently formed with Pavey sworn in as the Minister for Roads, Maritime and Freight with effect from 30 January 2017. Following the 2019 state election Pavey was appointed as the Minister for Water, Property and Housing in the second Berejiklian ministry with effect from 2 April 2019.

=== National Party Leadership ===
Following the resignation of National Party leader and Deputy Premier John Barilaro, Mrs. Pavey announced that she would run in the leadership contest, to be contested on 6 October 2021. She received the endorsement of popular talkback radio broadcaster and a Channel Nine commentator, Ray Hadley. If elected Leader, she would have been the first female leader of the party, and the first female conservative Deputy Premier of New South Wales (the first female deputy premier being Carmel Tebbutt, 2008–2011).

On 6 October 2021, Pavey was defeated in the leadership election, 15–3, against former Deputy Leader Paul Toole. Bronnie Taylor was elected unopposed as his deputy.

In a cabinet reshuffle in December 2021, Pavey was dropped from the Perrottet ministry.

== See also ==
- First Berejiklian ministry
- Second Berejiklian ministry
- Perrottet ministry

New South Wales Legislative Assembly
Preceded by Andrew Stoner	Member for Oxley; 2015–2023	Succeeded by Michael Kemp
Political offices
Preceded by Duncan Gay	Minister for Roads, Maritime and Freight; 2017–2019	Succeeded by Andrew Constance as Minister for Transport and Roads
Preceded by Duncan Gay	Minister for Roads, Maritime and Freight; 2017–2019	Succeeded by Paul Toole as Minister for Regional Transport and Roads
Preceded by Niall Blair as Minister for Regional Water	Minister for Water, Property and Housing; 2019–2021	Succeeded by Kevin Anderson as Minister for Lands and Water
Preceded by Victor Dominello as Minister for Finance, Services and Property	Minister for Water, Property and Housing; 2019–2021	Succeeded by Kevin Anderson as Minister for Lands and Water
Preceded by Anthony Roberts as Minister for Housing	Minister for Water, Property and Housing; 2019–2021	Succeeded by Anthony Roberts as Minister for Homes
