= Barilaro v Shanks-Markovina =

Defamation case before the Federal Court of Australia

Barilaro v Google
- Court: Federal Court of Australia
- Full case name: John Barilaro v Google LLC
- Citation: [2022] FCA 650

Case history
- Prior actions: Barilaro v Shanks-Markovina (No 1) [2021] FCA 789; Barilaro v Shanks-Markovina (No 2) [2021] FCA 950, (2021) 393 ALR 417; Barilaro v Shanks-Markovina (No 3) [2021] FCA 1100, (2021) 393 ALR 469

Court membership
- Judge sitting: Steven Rares

Keywords
- Practice and procedure; Constitutional law; Parliamentary privilege

Barilaro v Shanks-Markovina & Google was a defamation court case before the Federal Court of Australia in 2021 and 2022. The case ruled on allegations that two videos published by Jordan Shanks-Markovina on the friendlyjordies YouTube channel had brought then-Deputy Premier of New South Wales, John Barilaro, into public disrepute, odium, ridicule, and contempt.

The lawsuit was originally filed by Barilaro against the first respondent, Shanks-Markovina, as the videos' author, and the second respondent, Google, as their publisher via its YouTube service. The case against Shanks-Markovina was settled in November 2021, with Shanks-Markovina apologising to Barilaro in court for the remarks he made in the videos. The case against Google began on 21 March 2022 and concluded three days later. The judge ruled in favour of Barilaro on 6 June 2022.

In October 2021, Barilaro announced his resignation as the Deputy Premier of New South Wales, citing this ongoing defamation case with Shanks-Markovina as a significant factor in his decision to resign. This triggered a by-election in his former seat of Monaro.

== Background ==
External videos
- The disputed videos, edited as a consequence of the settlement between Barilaro and Shanks-Markovina.
- bruz
- Secret Dictatorship

Jordan Shanks-Markovina released on the friendlyjordies channel a video entitled "bruz" of 14 September 2020, and another entitled "Secret Dictatorship" on 21 October 2020. He also gate-crashed an event where Barilaro was speaking, dressed as the video game character Luigi.

On 27 May 2021, Barilaro initiated a defamation case against Shanks-Markovina and Google in the Federal Court of Australia, claiming that the two videos defamed him. Barilaro was required leave of the court to serve the required documents to Google, whose headquarters are in the United States. Justice Steven Rares granted this leave on 9 July 2021, citing rules 10.42 and 1.43 of the Federal Court Rules 2011. Google formally acknowledged to the court they had received the required documents.

Rares declined to consider defences relating to Barilaro's actions before a committee of the New South Wales Legislative Council as they would be a breach of parliamentary privilege contrary to Article 9 of the Bill of Rights 1688 (Eng) as law in New South Wales. He permitted Shanks-Markovina to file an amended defence omitting the prohibited defences and repleading the remaining defences in a more appropriate form. Under orders supplemental to the judgement delivered all sides were required to "serve outlines of evidence of witnesses on issues on which he or it bears the onus on or before 4pm on 24 September 2021" and "outlines of evidence of witnesses in reply on or before 4:00pm on 14 October 2021".

On 31 August Rares permitted the amended defence to be filed by 3 September and for Barilaro to file a reply a week later. The application for a jury trial was denied. Both Shanks-Markovina and Google were ordered to pay with respect to this particular application. Google was allowed a small extension of time to file and serve "outlines of evidence of witnesses on issues on which it bears the onus be extended to 4:00pm on 25 September 2021" and "any additional outline of evidence in relation to the second matter complained of on or before 4:00pm 29 September 2021" through a consent order dated 27 September 2021.

Barilaro resigned as Deputy Premier of New South Wales and as member for Monaro in October 2021 citing this case as one of the reasons for his resignation. A case management hearing originally scheduled for 15 October was postponed by three weeks. A mediation occurred on 26 October 2021, resulting in a settlement between Barilaro and Shanks-Markovina, but not with Google. Shanks-Markovina agreed to pay Barilaro $100,000 in court costs, edit the bruz and Secret Dictatorship videos as to remove defamatory imputations, stop selling merchandise depicting Barilaro upon his retirement from politics, refrain from publishing claims about Barilaro's personal life, and apologise through his barrister.

== Claims and defences ==
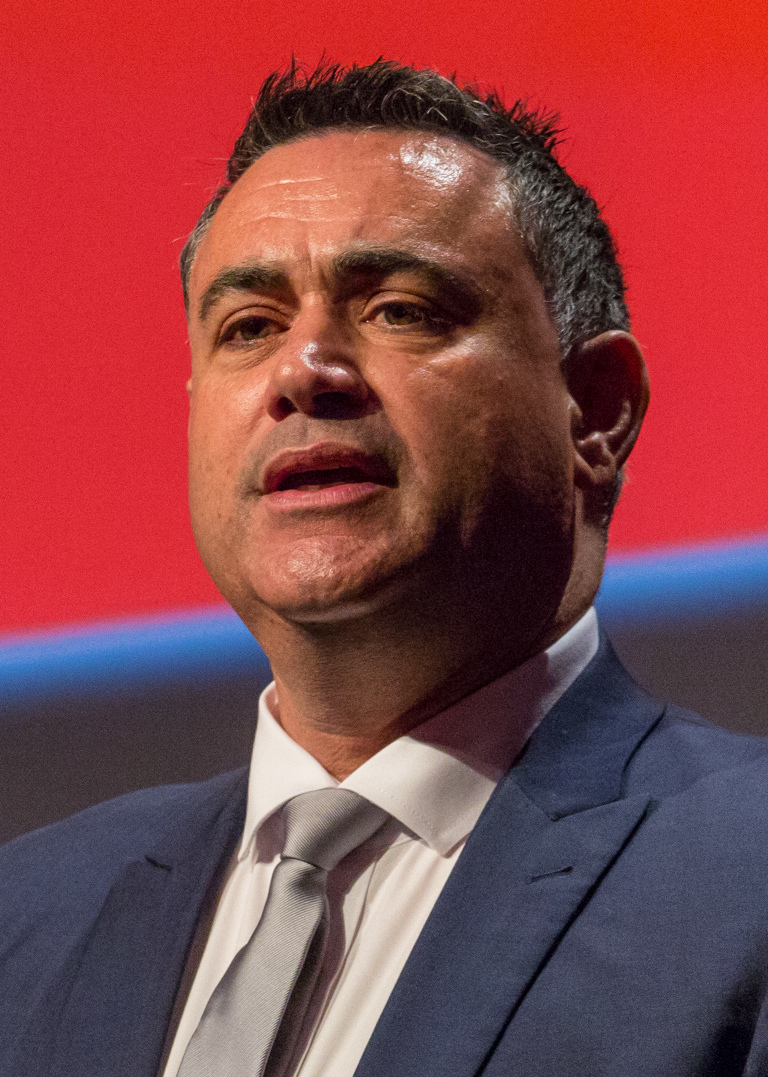
John Barilaro was the Former Deputy Premier of New South Wales

Barilaro filed a complaint before the Federal Court claiming that two videos published on the friendlyjordies YouTube channel unreasonably defamed him. In his pleadings Barilaro claimed that the first video, bruz, was defamatory because it conveyed the imputations that Barilaro:

1. "is a corrupt conman" (imputation 9(a))
2. "committed perjury nine times" (imputation 9(b))
3. "so conducted himself in committing perjury nine times that he should be gaoled" (imputation 9(c))
4. "corruptly gave $3.3 million to a beef company" (imputation 9(d))
5. "corruptly voted against a Royal Commission into water theft" (imputation 9(e))

For the second video, Secret Dictatorship, the alleged imputations were that Barilaro:

1. "acted corruptly by engaging in the blackmailing of councillors" (imputation 15(a))
2. "acted corruptly by engaging in the blackmailing of councillors using taxpayer money" (imputation 15(b))
3. "pocketed millions of dollars which have been stolen from the Narrandera Shire Council" (imputation 15(c))

In Shanks-Markovina's defence, he admitted that imputations 9(a), 9(b), and 9(c) were conveyed, and were defamatory of Barilaro, but denied that the other imputations were conveyed, while conceding that if they were conveyed, they were defamatory of Barilaro. The defence argued that imputations 9(a) and (b) were substantially true under section 25 of the 2005 NSW Defamation Act. His defence included particulars for imputation 9(a), but stated that the particulars for imputation 9(b), the allegation that Barilaro committed perjury nine times in parliament, could not be given until Barilaro and the NSW Legislative Council waived parliamentary privilege. The defence also argued that the video contained a number of contextual imputations that were substantially true, and that as a result, the imputations that Barilaro was suing over did not cause further harm to his reputation. The defence also plead the "honest opinion" defence under section 31 of the defamation act for imputations 9(a), 9(c), and if conveyed, 9(d), 9(e), 15(a), and 15(b).

The proposed justification defence for imputation 9(b) would involve impeaching or questioning in Federal Court what Mr Barilaro said in the proceedings of a committee of the Legislative Council. Rares noted that this violated Barilaro's Parliamentary privilege under Article 9 of the Bill of Rights 1688 (Eng), applied to proceedings in the Parliament of New South Wales by force of the Imperial Acts Application Act 1969 (NSW), thereby binding him to strike out the defence if it were to be filed. Shanks-Markovina filed an interlocutory application, arguing that imputations 9(b) and 9(c) should be struck out, because his inability to file a defence for them constituted an abuse of process on the part of Barilaro.

This was rejected by Rares. In his judgement, he stated that "Barilaro has no capacity to waive [his parliamentary privilege] himself," that Shanks-Markovina "was not responding to an attack made by Mr Barilaro on him under Parliamentary privilege," and that Shanks-Markovina's inability to utilise a defence that did not infringe upon Barilaro's Parliamentary privilege was not caused by Barilaro, but instead "because of the way in which Mr Shanks chose to publish the bruz video." The judgement also stated that Rares found that "it would be unfair to deprive Mr Barilaro of the right to vindicate his reputation that Mr Shanks attacked," and that he believed a decision to strike out the imputations "would allow the publisher to be free to defame [Barilaro] or other person [who has engaged in proceedings in Parliament] with impunity on the basis that any defence of the publisher’s attack would infringe on Parliamentary privilege." The defences Shanks-Markovina put forward were accepted in part, found to be deficient in part, and ordered to be replead or found to be unable to be plead unless Parliamentary privilege was waived.

Respondent Google plead defences of qualified privilege and honest opinion, and agreed with Shanks-Markovina's application for the court for trial before a jury. The application was dismissed, and both Shanks-Markovina and Google were ordered to pay costs with respect to this particular application. Later, Google revised their defences as to only plead the public interest defence, which was created by the new Defamation Act that came into force on 1 July 2021, after both videos had been published. Shortly before the trial, Google withdrew all defences, and conceded that the videos defamed Barilaro, leaving the trial as a matter of determining damages.

== Trial ==
Google's conduct in maintaining their defences, only to withdraw them days before the trial was criticised by Justice Rares, who accused Google of wasting Barilaro's money, and the federal court's time, claiming that, "if this [legal case] was uncontested this could have been heard last year." Barilaro's barrister, Sue Chrysanthou argued that the only rational conclusion for Google's behaviour was to waste Barilaro's time and money, as to pressure him into agreeing to a settlement, and that Google's actions had caused Barilaro to "expend hundreds of thousands of dollars in this case as an individual against a company worth billions and billions."

During the course of the trial, several videos were uploaded referencing Barilaro's legal counsel. Rares stated that he was "shocked" by the videos, that suggested Barilaro's lawyers may have submitted false statutory declarations. Rares stated that the videos appeared to be a "calculated" attempt at influencing Barilaro and his lawyers into withdrawing the case, and that he would give "serious consideration" towards referring the case to the Federal Court's registrar for a contempt of court prosecution. Rares went on to say that he was "completely dumbfounded" by Google's conduct in failing to remove the videos upon being notified, stating that they "know the law of contempt - or they should."

During the trial, Chrysanthou argued that "Google facilitated a vile and despicably racist smear campaign against John Barilaro", and that the videos resulted in Barilaro's resignation from public office. She also argued that Shanks-Markovina had a clearly apparent hatred of Barilaro, that the videos are of an abusive and racist nature, and that Google refused to remove the videos in spite of them being in violation of their own content policies. Furthermore, it was argued that the videos had prompted a wave of online abuse towards Barilaro, and resulted in him being regularly confronted by members of the public. Barilaro's former deputy chief of staff, Jeff McCormack, told that court that Barilaro had gone from being an "incredibly social" person to being withdrawn, that he had attempted to disguise himself while in public, that Barilaro had received numerous threats targeted at him and his family, and that after the publication of the Secret Dictatorship video in October 2020, Barilaro was "basically at the physical point where he was considering self-harm and discussing resignation from his role." At several occasions during the trial, Barilaro appeared to be distressed. He temporarily left the courtroom after becoming upset during the hearing's final day.

It was argued by Chrysanthou that while Google had justified leaving the videos up by claiming that the videos cited mainstream media articles about Barilaro, Google "did not do a Google search of [Barilaro]," and if they had read the articles, "they would have seen that they do not support the scandalous allegations being made about [Barilaro]." While Google's lawyer, James Hmelnitsky, conceded that he believed that Google's withdrawn defences were baseless, he argued that Google was only liable for the period after Barilaro had complained to Google, not from the date of the videos' publication, and urged Rares not to account for any potential contempt of court when determining the amount of damages payable to Barilaro. On 6 June, Barilaro was awarded $715,000 in defamation damages from Google.
