= Minister for Water (New South Wales) =

Government minister in the New South Wales, Australia

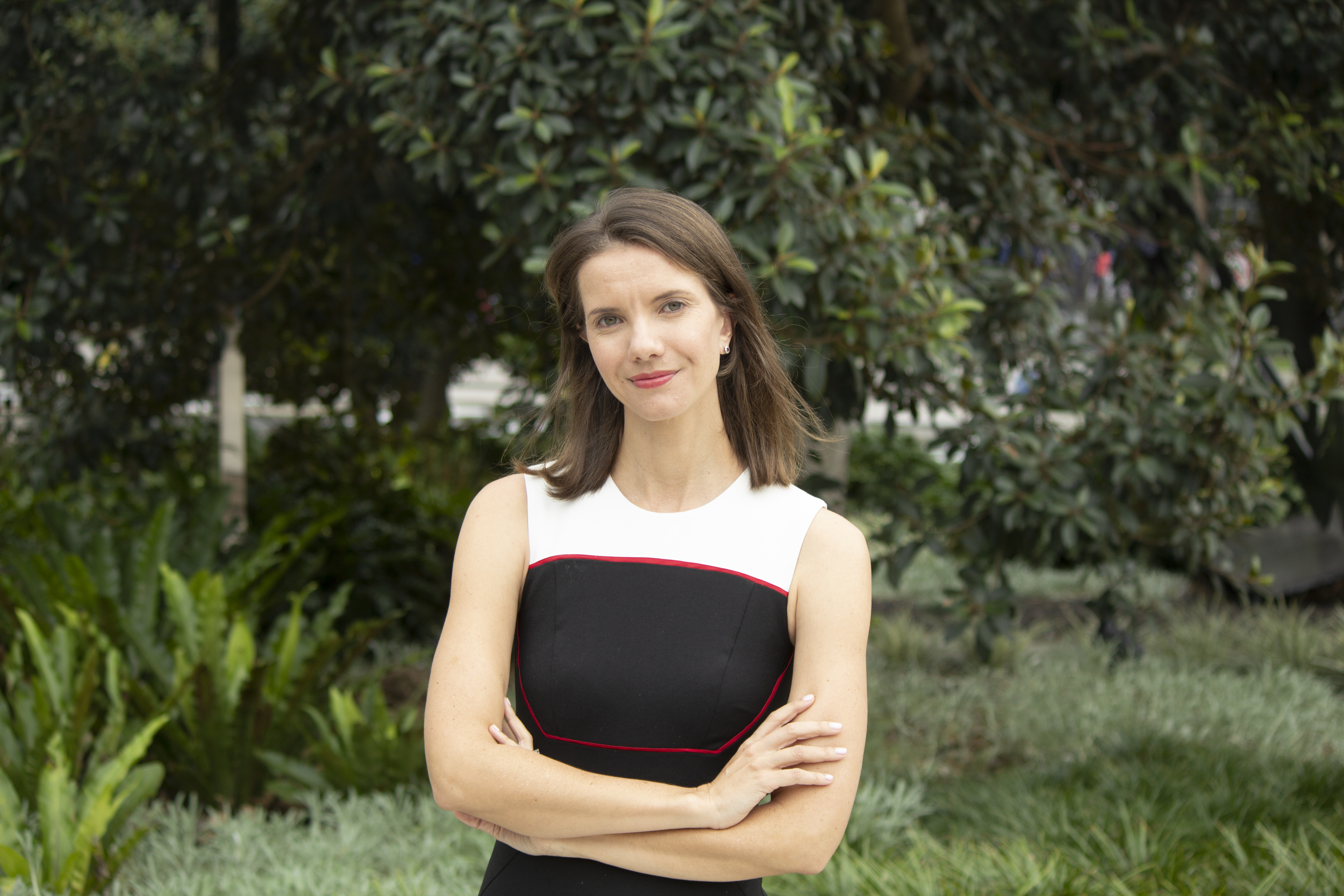
- Incumbent; Rose Jackson since 5 April 2023
- Department of Climate Change, Energy, the Environment and Water
- Style: The Honourable
- Appointer: Governor of New South Wales
- Inaugural holder: Bruce Cowan (as Minister for Water Resources)
- Formation: 17 December 1975

The New South Wales Minister for Water (previously the Minister for Water Resources and Minister for Water Utilities) is a minister in the New South Wales Government with responsibility for the administration and development for water and crown lands in New South Wales, Australia. The minister administers the portfolio through the Department of Climate Change, Energy, the Environment and Water and a range of other government agencies.

Ultimately the minister is responsible to the Parliament of New South Wales.

== List of ministers ==
The following individuals have served as the Minister for Water or any precedent titles:

Title	Minister	Party	Term start	Term end	Time in office	Notes
Minister for Water Resources	Bruce Cowan	Country	17 December 1975	14 May 1976	149 days	
Minister for Water Resources	Lin Gordon	Labor	14 May 1976	2 October 1981	5 years, 141 days	
Minister for Water Resources	Paul Landa	Labor	2 October 1981	1 February 1983	1 year, 122 days	
Minister for Water Resources	Paul Whelan	Labor	1 February 1983	5 April 1984	1 year, 64 days	
Minister for Water Resources	Janice Crosio	Labor	4 July 1986	21 March 1988	1 year, 261 days	
Minister for Water Resources	Ian Causley	National	24 July 1990	6 June 1991	317 days	
Minister for Land and Water Conservation	George Souris	National	26 May 1993	4 April 1995	1 year, 313 days	
Minister for Land and Water Conservation	Kim Yeadon	Labor	4 April 1995	1 December 1997	2 years, 241 days	
Minister for Land and Water Conservation	Richard Amery	Labor	1 December 1997	21 November 2001	3 years, 355 days	
Minister for Land and Water Conservation	John Aquilina	Labor	21 November 2001	2 April 2003	1 year, 132 days	
Minister for Energy and Utilities	Frank Sartor	Labor	2 April 2003	3 August 2005	2 years, 123 days	
Minister for Utilities	Carl Scully	Labor	3 August 2005	17 February 2006	198 days	
Minister for Water Utilities	David Campbell	Labor	17 February 2006	2 April 2007	1 year, 44 days	
Minister for Water Utilities	Nathan Rees	Labor	2 April 2007	27 February 2008	1 year, 156 days	
Minister for Water	Nathan Rees	Labor	27 February 2008	5 September 2008	1 year, 156 days	
Minister for Water	Phil Costa	Labor	8 September 2008	28 March 2011	2 years, 201 days	
Minister for Natural Resources, Lands and Water	Kevin Humphries	National	23 April 2014	2 April 2015	344 days	
Minister for Lands and Water	Niall Blair	National	2 April 2015	30 January 2017	3 years, 303 days	
Minister for Regional Water	Niall Blair	National	30 January 2017	23 March 2019	3 years, 303 days	
Minister for Water, Property and Housing	Melinda Pavey	National	2 April 2019	21 December 2021	2 years, 263 days	
Minister for Lands and Water	Kevin Anderson	National	21 December 2021	28 March 2023	1 year, 97 days	
Minister for the Environment	Penny Sharpe	Labor	28 March 2023	5 April 2023	8 days	
Minister for Water	Rose Jackson	Labor	5 April 2023	incumbent	3 years, 155 days	

== Former ministerial titles ==
=== Climate Change, Environment and Water ===
The title of Minister for Climate Change, Environment and Water was held by Phil Koperberg from 2007 to 2008. This portfolio was existed alongside the Minister for Water Utilities, which was held by Nathan Rees at that time.

Title	Minister	Party	Term start	Term end	Time in office	Notes
Minister for Climate Change, Environment and Water	Phil Koperberg	Labor	2 April 2007	27 February 2008	331 days	

=== Utilities ===
The title of Minister for Energy and Utilities existed alongside the Minister for Regional Water portfolio, which was held by Niall Blair, between 2017 and 2019.

Title	Minister	Party	Ministry	Term start	Term end	Time in office	Notes
Minister for Energy and Utilities	Frank Sartor	Labor	Carr (4)	2 April 2003	3 August 2005	2 years, 123 days	
Minister for Utilities	Carl Scully	Labor	Iemma (1)	3 August 2005	17 February 2006	198 days	
Minister for Water Utilities	David Campbell	Labor	Iemma (1)	17 February 2006	2 April 2007	1 year, 44 days	
Minister for Water Utilities	Nathan Rees	Labor	Iemma (2)	2 April 2007	27 February 2008	331 days	
Minister for Energy and Utilities	Don Harwin	Liberal	Berejiklian (1)	30 January 2017	23 March 2019	2 years, 52 days	

== See also ==
- Minister for the Environment and Water (Australia)
  - Minister for Water (Victoria)
  - Minister for Water (Western Australia)
- List of New South Wales government agencies
- Minister for Agriculture
- Minister for Lands and Property
- Minister for Environment
