= Bronnie Taylor =

Australian politician

The Honourable Bronnie Taylor
- Taylor in 2022

Deputy Leader of the Government in the Legislative Council
- In office 2 April 2019 – 28 March 2023
- Leader: Don Harwin
- Preceded by: Sarah Mitchell
- Succeeded by: John Graham

21st Deputy Leader of the National Party in New South Wales
- In office 6 October 2021 – 20 June 2024
- Leader: Paul Toole; Dugald Saunders
- Preceded by: Paul Toole
- Succeeded by: Gurmesh Singh

Minister for Women
- In office 2 April 2019 – 28 March 2023
- Premier: Gladys Berejiklian; Dominic Perrottet
- Preceded by: Tanya Davies
- Succeeded by: Jodie Harrison

Minister for Mental Health
- In office 2 April 2019 – 28 March 2023
- Premier: Gladys Berejiklian; Dominic Perrottet
- Preceded by: Tanya Davies
- Succeeded by: Ryan Park

Minister for Regional Health
- In office 21 December 2021 – 28 March 2023
- Premier: Dominic Perrottet
- Preceded by: new position
- Succeeded by: Ryan Park

Minister for Regional Youth
- In office 2 April 2019 – 21 December 2021
- Premier: Gladys Berejiklian; Dominic Perrottet
- Preceded by: new position
- Succeeded by: Ben Franklin

Member of the New South Wales Legislative Council
- In office 28 March 2015 – 16 September 2024
- Succeeded by: Scott Barrett

Personal details
- Party: National
- Spouse: Duncan Taylor
- Children: 2
- Education: University of Sydney
- Occupation: Nurse; Politician

Bronwyn "Bronnie" Taylor is an Australian retired politician. She was the New South Wales Minister for Women, the Minister for Regional Health, and the Minister for Mental Health in the Perrottet ministry, from December 2021 to March 2023. Taylor had served as the Deputy Leader of the National Party in New South Wales from October 2021 until June 2024. She was a Member of the New South Wales Legislative Council from 2015 until 2024, representing The Nationals.

Previously, Taylor was the Minister for Mental Health, Regional Youth and Women in the second Berejiklian ministry Before entering parliament, she served on the Cooma-Monaro Shire Council.

In June 2024, Taylor announced her retirement from the Legislative Council. Taylor was replaced by Scott Barrett in September 2024.

== Background and early career ==
Taylor is the daughter of Ward Washington, who died of pancreatic cancer. She studied nursing at the University of Sydney, and developed specialty in the field of both palliative care and oncology. She was one of the original Clinical Nurse Consultants appointed for the McGrath Foundation and then worked for NSW Health until June 2014. Her final nursing appointment before entering parliament was Director of Cancer Services for the Southern New South Wales Local Health District. Elected to Cooma-Monaro Shire Council in 2010, Taylor became Deputy Mayor in 2011 was nominated for a 2013 award to recognise the outstanding contributions and achievements of women in local government.

== Political career ==
Taylor was elected a Member of the Legislative Council at the 2015 state election.

Taylor previously served on several standing committees, having been the Chair of the Standing Committee on Social issues, and previously sat on the Joint Select Committee of Companion Animal Breeding Practices in New South Wales. On 25 August 2016, Taylor was appointed to the position of Parliamentary Secretary for Southern NSW and Regional Communications. Following the 2019 state election, Taylor was appointed as the Minister for Mental Health, Regional Youth and Women in the second Berejiklian ministry with effect from 2 April 2019; and in December 2021, her portfolios were changed to Minister for Women, Minister for Regional Health, and Minister for Mental Health.

In June 2024, Taylor announced her resignation from the Legislative Council.

== Personal life ==
Taylor is married to Duncan Taylor and together they have two daughters, Hannah and Holly. Taylor is the sister-in-law of Angus Taylor.

Political offices
Preceded by Tanya Davies	Minister for Women; 2019–2023	Succeeded by Jodie Harrison
Preceded by Tanya Davies	Minister for Mental Health; 2019–2023	Succeeded by Ryan Park
New title	Minister for Regional Health; 2021–2023	Succeeded by Ryan Park
New title	Minister for Regional Youth; 2019–2021	Succeeded by Ben Franklin
Party political offices
Preceded by Paul Toole	Deputy Leader of the National Party in New South Wales; 2021–present	Incumbent
