= Paul Toole =

Australian politician (born 1970)

The Honourable Paul Toole MP
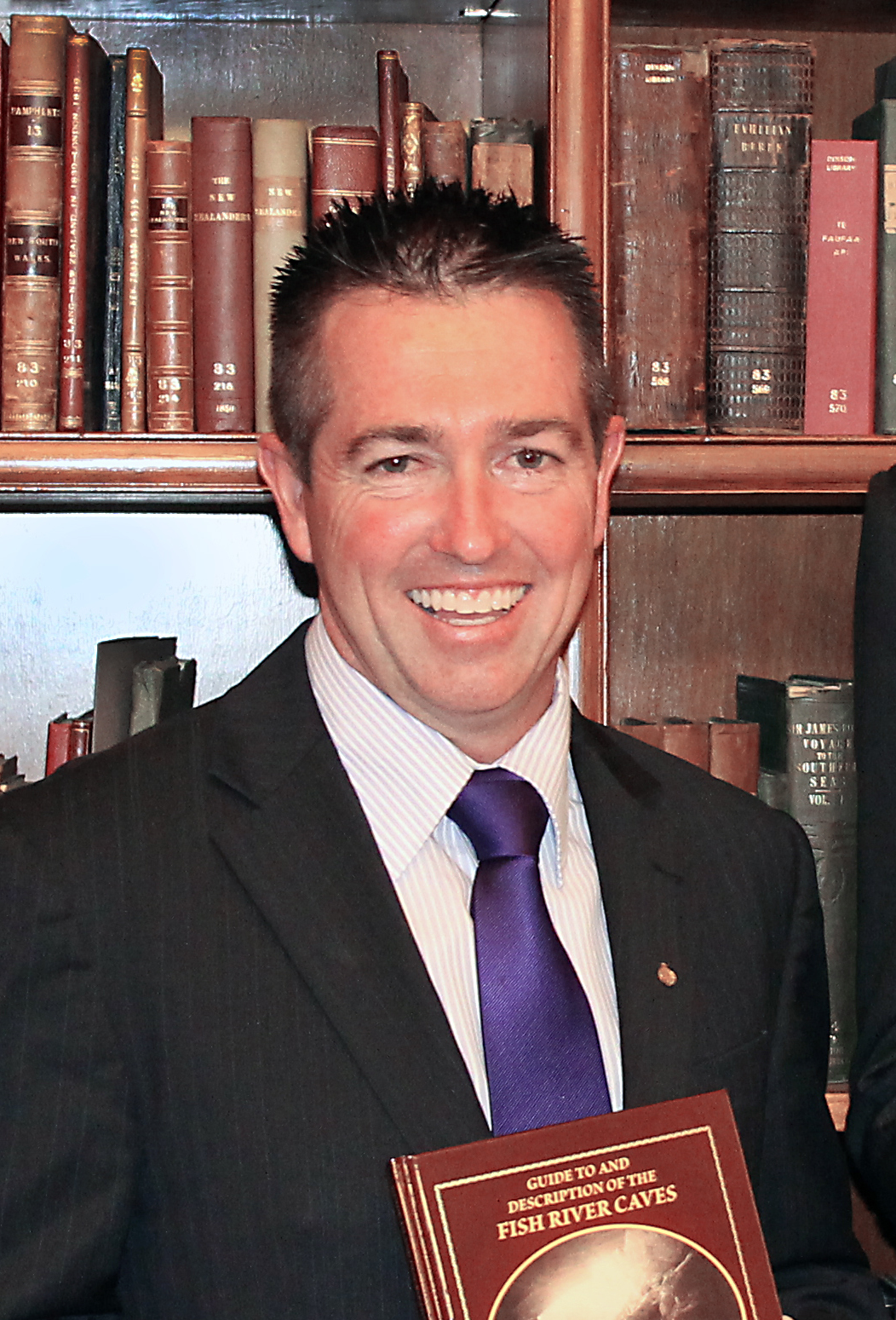

19th Deputy Premier of New South Wales
- In office 6 October 2021 – 28 March 2023
- Premier: Dominic Perrottet
- Preceded by: John Barilaro
- Succeeded by: Prue Car

13th Leader of the New South Wales National Party
- In office 6 October 2021 – 8 May 2023
- Deputy: Bronnie Taylor
- Preceded by: John Barilaro
- Succeeded by: Dugald Saunders
Former Cabinet positions
Minister for Regional New South Wales
In office 6 October 2021 – 28 March 2023
Premier	Dominic Perrottet
Preceded by	John Barilaro
Minister for Police
In office 21 December 2021 – 28 March 2023
Leader	Dominic Perrottet
Preceded by	David Elliott (as Minister for Police and Emergency Services)
Succeeded by	Yasmin Catley (as Minister for Police and Counter-terrorism)
20th Deputy Leader of the National Party in New South Wales
In office 29 March 2019 – 5 October 2021 (Note: To run for the leadership contest, following its vacancy.)
Leader	John Barilaro
Preceded by	Niall Blair
Succeeded by	Bronnie Taylor
Minister for Regional Transport and Roads
In office 2 April 2019 – 21 December 2021
Premier	Gladys Berejiklian; Dominic Perrottet
Preceded by	Melinda Pavey
Succeeded by	Sam Farraway
Minister for Lands and Forestry
In office 30 January 2017 – 23 March 2019
Premier	Gladys Berejiklian
Preceded by	Steve Whan
Succeeded by	Position abolished
Minister for Racing
In office 30 January 2017 – 23 March 2019
Premier	Gladys Berejiklian
Preceded by	Troy Grant
Succeeded by	Position abolished
Minister for Local Government
In office 23 April 2014 – 30 January 2017
Premier	Mike Baird
Preceded by	Don Page
Succeeded by	Gabrielle Upton

Member of the New South Wales Legislative Assembly for Bathurst
- Incumbent
- Assumed office 26 March 2011
- Preceded by: Gerard Martin
Former local government positions
Mayor of Bathurst
In office September 2007 – September 2012
Deputy	Ian North
Preceded by	Norm Mann
Succeeded by	Monica Morse
Deputy Mayor of Bathurst
In office March 2005 – September 2007
Mayor	Norm Mann
Preceded by	Position established
Succeeded by	Ian North
Member of the Evans Shire Council
In office 9 September 1995 – May 2004

Personal details
- Born: Paul Lawrence Toole; 2 August 1970 (age 56) Peel, New South Wales, Australia (Note: Raised in Peel, not known if Toole was born there.)
- Party: National
- Parent(s): Trevor Toole; Ellen Toole
- Education: Mitchell College of Advanced Education (DipTeach)
- Occupation: Teacher; Politician

Paul Lawrence Toole (born 2 August 1970) is an Australian politician. Toole was the Deputy Premier of New South Wales from 2021 to 2023, and the leader of the New South Wales Nationals from October 2021 to May 2023.

Toole was the Minister for Regional New South Wales in the second Berejiklian and Perrottet ministries, from April 2019; the New South Wales Minister for Police in the Perrottet ministry from December 2021, and the New South Wales Shadow Minister for Police from March 2023.

He is a member of the New South Wales Legislative Assembly, representing Bathurst for the Nationals since 26 March 2011.

Toole was previously the Deputy Leader of the NSW Nationals between 2019 and 2021; was the Minister for Regional Transport and Roads between April 2019 and December 2021; the Minister for Lands and Forestry and the Minister for Racing in the First Berejiklian ministry from January 2017 until March 2019; and the Minister for Local Government in the Second Baird ministry from April 2014 until January 2017.

== Early years and background ==
Toole is one of nine children raised by Trevor and Ellen Toole, of Peel, a village outside Bathurst, in the central west of New South Wales. Toole's father was a thrice-unsuccessful candidate for state and federal political office, representing the National Party at the 1984 and 1995 state elections for Bathurst and the 1996 federal election, for Calare. Paul Toole's grandfather, Jack Toole, was an unsuccessful Liberal candidate at 1956 state election, also for Bathurst. Two of Toole's brothers were jailed in 2012 for running a major drug syndicate in Newcastle, and sentenced to seven and nine years in prison. They were each arrested again, one in 2022 in Newcastle and one for dealing drugs in the Central West in 2020 and 2021, leading to a four-year prison sentence.

In 1992, Toole began his school teaching career in Orange, New South Wales. After teaching at two schools there, Toole taught at Assumption Primary School in Bathurst from 1995 to 2011.

== Political career ==
In 1995, Toole was elected a councillor to Evans Shire Council. Evans was amalgamated with Bathurst to create the Bathurst Regional Council in 2005. He was elected to the new Council that year, filling the post of deputy mayor.

Paul became mayor in 2007.

On 30 October 2010, Toole was the sole nominee that sought and gained endorsement by the National Party as the candidate for the state seat of Bathurst. At the March 2011 elections, Toole was elected and recorded a swing of 36.3 points – almost unheard of in Australian politics – in the traditionally Labor seat, winning 74.8% of the two-party vote Toole's main competitor was Labor's Dale Turner; and his election followed the retirement of Labor member, Gerard Martin. Toole picked up enough of a swing to turn Bathurst from safe Labor to safe National in one stroke.

Following his election to state parliament, Toole announced his decision to immediately retire from teaching and step down as Mayor in September 2011. He stated that he will remain on Council until the 2012 local government elections.

=== Member of Parliament ===
Due to the ICAC related resignation of Barry O'Farrell as Premier, and the subsequent ministerial reshuffle by Mike Baird, the new Liberal Leader, in April 2014 Toole was promoted as the Minister for Local Government in the first Baird government; and was reconfirmed as the Minister for Local Government in the second Baird ministry.

Following the resignation of Baird as Premier, Gladys Berejiklian was elected as Liberal leader and sworn in as Premier. Toole was sworn in on 30 January 2017 as the Minister for Lands and Forestry and the Minister for Racing in the first Berejiklian ministry. Following the 2019 state election, Niall Blair, the former Deputy Leader of the Nationals, announced his resignation from parliament. Toole contested the vacancy and was elected Deputy Leader. He was subsequently appointed as the Minister for Regional Transport and Roads in the second Berejiklian ministry, with effect from 2 April 2019.

From the mid-2010s, the state government controversially began a program of amalgamating a number of NSW regional councils together, to address debt issues, with 152 regional councils being merged to 112 by 2016. In 2021, Toole announced that 44 councils would be required to merge into 20, however, the councils challenged the action in court, and won. The councils included areas of his own electorate (such as Oberon and Blayney), and attracted criticism from the likes of Alan Jones.

=== National Party leadership ===
Following the resignation of NSW Nationals leader and Deputy Premier John Barilaro, Melinda Pavey announced that she would contest the leadership. Toole later announced that he would run in the leadership contest, that was to take place the following day.

On 6 October 2021, Toole successfully won the leadership contest against Pavey, 15–3. Bronnie Taylor was elected unopposed as his deputy. Toole was sworn in as Deputy Premier, Minister for Regional New South Wales, and Minister for Regional Transport and Roads. In a reorganisation of the Perrottet ministry, Toole was sworn in as Minister for Police, relinquishing the Regional Transport and Roads portfolio, with effect from 21 December 2021. On the same day, Pavey was demoted from the ministry.

The 2023 New South Wales state election was held in March. The election was won by Labor with a strong swing, but the Nationals lost just one seat, with Toole retaining the seat of Bathurst.

In April 2023, Toole's leadership was challenged by Dugald Saunders. Toole won the initial leadership spill eight to seven (with one informal vote). However, a further challenge saw Toole lose his leadership role to Saunders. This came amid tensions about colleague Ben Franklin's friendship with NSW Labor premier Chris Minns, and his intent to run for Upper House president and leave the Lower House. Toole remained in the Lower House as Shadow Minister for Police.

== See also ==
- Second Baird ministry
- First Berejiklian ministry
- Second Berejiklian ministry
- First Perrottet ministry
- Second Perrottet ministry

== Notes ==
New South Wales Legislative Assembly
Preceded by Gerard Martin	Member for Bathurst; 2011–present	Incumbent
Political offices
Preceded by John Barilaro	Deputy Premier of New South Wales; 2021–2023	Succeeded by Prue Car
Preceded by John Barilaro as Minister for Regional New South Wales, Industry and Trade	Minister for Regional New South Wales; 2021–2023	Succeeded by Tara Moriarty
Preceded by David Elliott as Minister for Police and Emergency Services	Minister for Police; 2021–2023	Succeeded by Yasmin Catley
Preceded by Melinda Pavey as Minister for Roads, Maritime and Freight	Minister for Regional Transport and Roads; 2019–2021	Succeeded by Sam Farraway
Preceded by Niall Blair as Minister for Primary Industries	Minister for Lands and Forestry; 2017–2019	Succeeded by Adam Marshall as Minister for Agriculture and Western New South Wales
Preceded by Niall Blair as Minister for Lands and Water	Minister for Lands and Forestry; 2017–2019	Succeeded by Adam Marshall as Minister for Agriculture and Western New South Wales
Preceded by Troy Grant	Minister for Racing; 2017–2019	Portfolio abolished
Preceded by Don Page	Minister for Local Government; 2014–2017	Succeeded by Gabrielle Upton
Party political offices
Preceded by Niall Blair	Deputy Leader of the New South Wales National Party; 2019–2021	Succeeded by Bronnie Taylor
Preceded by John Barilaro	Leader of the New South Wales National Party; 2021–2023	Succeeded by Dugald Saunders
