= Kevin Anderson (Australian politician) =

Australian politician

The Honourable Kevin Anderson MP
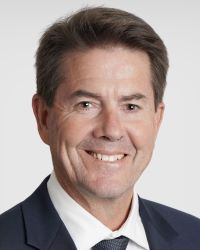

Minister for Lands and Water
- In office 21 December 2021 – 28 March 2023
- Preceded by: Melinda Pavey (as Minister for Water, Property and Housing)
- Succeeded by: Steve Kamper (as Minister for Lands and Property); Rose Jackson (as Minister for Water)

Minister for Hospitality and Racing
- In office 21 December 2021 – 28 March 2023
- Preceded by: new portfolio
- Succeeded by: David Harris (as Minister for Gaming and Racing)

Deputy leader of the New South Wales National Party
- Incumbent
- Assumed office 18 November 2025
- Leader: Gurmesh Singh
- Preceded by: Gurmesh Singh

Member of the New South Wales Legislative Assembly for Tamworth
- Incumbent
- Assumed office 26 March 2011
- Preceded by: Peter Draper

Minister for Better Regulation and Innovation
- In office 2 April 2019 – 21 December 2021
- Preceded by: Matt Kean (as Minister for Innovation and Better Regulation)
- Succeeded by: Alister Henskens (as Minister for Science, Innovation and Technology)

Personal details
- Party: The Nationals
- Spouse: Anna Anderson (died January 2026)
- Occupation: Journalist and marketing consultant
- Website: kevinanderson.com.au

Kevin John Anderson is an Australian politician serving in the New South Wales Legislative Assembly. He has represented Tamworth as a member of the Nationals since 26 March 2011.

Anderson was the New South Wales Minister for Better Regulation and Innovation in the second Berejiklian and Perrottet ministries between April 2019 and December 2021. Anderson was later the Minister for Lands and Water and the Minister for Hospitality and Racing in the Second Perrottet ministry from December 2021 to March 2023.

== Early years and background ==
Anderson moved to Tamworth at the age of 30. He spent eleven years as a journalist and news reader with the local Prime Television station. He left Prime in 2004 to work with Hunter New England Area Health Service as a communications and business development manager. He stood unsuccessfully for the Nationals in Tamworth at the 2007 election.

Anderson was a director of Centreboard Media, a local public relations and marketing consultancy with experience in events such as the Tamworth Country Music Festival. Anderson has been active in community groups in the region, including Westpac Rescue Helicopter, the Salvation Army, the St Nicholas School Board, and Ronald McDonald House in Tamworth. In his spare time Anderson plays rhythm guitar and sings in a local band called Splashpool.

== Political career ==
In a first initiative for the Nationals, Anderson was endorsed following a plebiscite where 4,293 local people voted from a pre-selected field of four candidates. The vote was open to members of the Nationals and the general community, voting at eight polling stations in the electorate, open to anyone on the NSW electoral roll. Anderson defeated James Treloar, the local mayor, on preferences.

At the March 2011 elections, Anderson was elected Member for Tamworth and received a swing of 14.7 points, defeating the sitting independent Peter Draper, winning 57.8 per cent of the vote on a two-party-preferred basis. Following the 2019 state election, Anderson was sworn in as the Minister for Better Regulation and Innovation in the second Berejiklian ministry, with effect from 2 April 2019. Following Berejiklian's resignation as Premier, the election of Dominic Perrottet as Liberal leader, and a subsequent rearrangement of the Perrottet ministry, Anderson was sworn in as Minister for Lands and Water and Minister for Hospitality and Racing on 21 December 2021. On 9 June 2023, Anderson was granted retention of The Honourable title by the Governor for life, for having served as a Member of the Executive Council for more than three years.

On 18 November 2025, following the resignation of Dugald Saunders, Anderson was elected deputy leader of the NSW National Party alongside Gurmesh Singh’s election as leader.

== See also ==
- Second Berejiklian ministry
- Perrottet ministry

New South Wales Legislative Assembly
Preceded by Peter Draper	Member for Tamworth; 2011–present	Incumbent
Political offices
Preceded by Melinda Pavey as Minister for Water, Property and Housing	Minister for Lands and Water; 2021–2023	Succeeded by Rose Jackson as Minister for Water
Preceded by Melinda Pavey as Minister for Water, Property and Housing	Minister for Lands and Water; 2021–2023	Succeeded by Steve Kamper as Minister for Lands and Property
New title	Minister for Hospitality and Racing; 2021–2023	Succeeded by David Harris as Minister for Gaming and Racing
Preceded by Matt Kean as Minister for Innovation and Better Regulation	Minister for Better Regulation and Innovation; 2019–2021	Succeeded by Alister Henskens as Minister for Science, Innovation and Technology
