= John Barilaro =

Australian politician (born 1971)

The Honourable John Barilaro
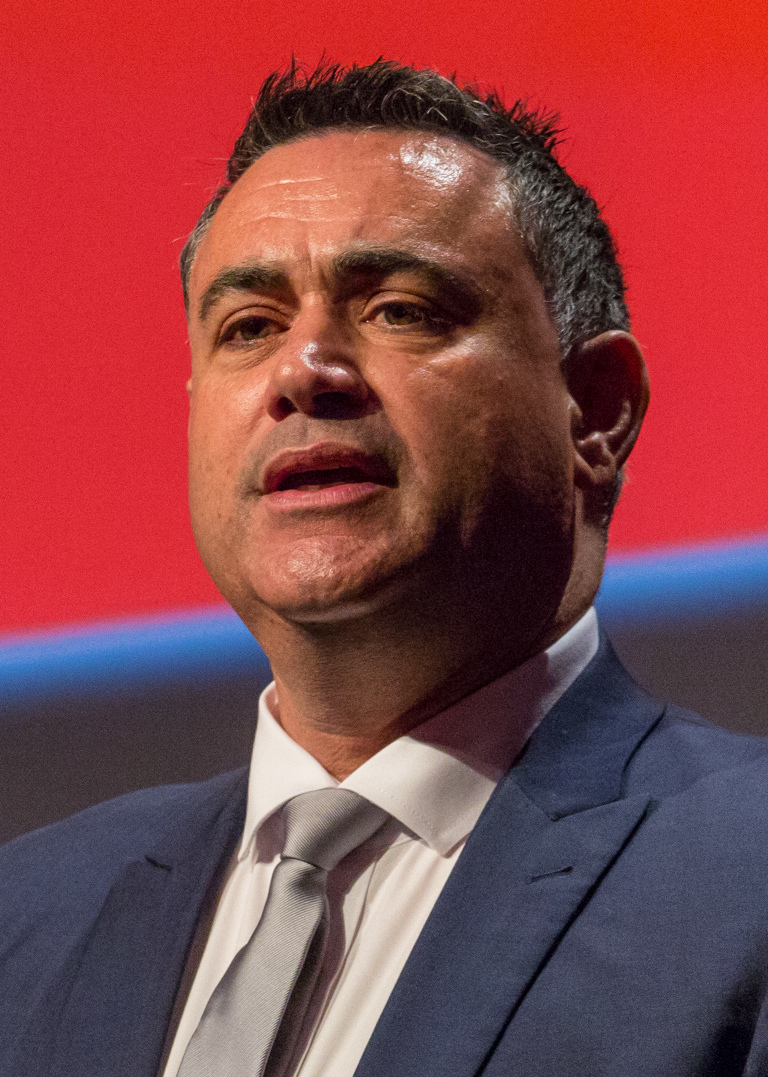
- Barilaro in 2016

18th Deputy Premier of New South Wales
- In office 15 November 2016 – 6 October 2021
- Premier: Mike Baird; Gladys Berejiklian; Dominic Perrottet
- Preceded by: Troy Grant
- Succeeded by: Paul Toole

Leader of the National Party in New South Wales
- In office 15 November 2016 – 6 October 2021
- Premier: Mike Baird; Gladys Berejiklian; Dominic Perrottet
- Deputy: Niall Blair; Paul Toole
- Preceded by: Troy Grant
- Succeeded by: Paul Toole
Ministerial positions
Minister for Regional New South Wales, Industry and Trade
In office 2 April 2019 – 4 October 2021
Premier	Gladys Berejiklian
Preceded by	Himself (as Minister for Regional New South Wales); Niall Blair (as Minister for Trade and Industry)
Succeeded by	Stuart Ayres (as Minister for Trade and Industry); Paul Toole (as Minister for Regional New South Wales)
Minister for Regional Development / Minister for Regional New South Wales
In office 2 April 2015 – 23 March 2019
Premier	Mike Baird; Gladys Berejiklian
Preceded by	Troy Grant (as Minister for Regional Infrastructure and Services)
Succeeded by	himself (as Minister for Regional New South Wales, Industry and Trade)
Minister for Small Business
In office 17 October 2014 – 23 March 2019
Premier	Mike Baird; Gladys Berejiklian
Preceded by	Andrew Stoner
Succeeded by	Damien Tudehope (as Minister for Finance and Small Business)
Minister for Skills
In office 2 April 2015 – 23 March 2019
Premier	Mike Baird; Gladys Berejiklian
Preceded by	Verity Firth (as Minister for Education and Training)
Succeeded by	Geoff Lee (as Minister for Skills and Tertiary Education)
Minister for Regional Tourism
In office 17 October 2014 – 2 April 2015
Premier	Mike Baird
Preceded by	Katrina Hodgkinson
Succeeded by	Stuart Ayres (as Minister for Trade, Tourism and Major Events)

Member of the New South Wales Parliament for Monaro
- In office 26 March 2011 – 31 December 2021
- Preceded by: Steve Whan
- Succeeded by: Nichole Overall
- Majority: 11.61% (2019)

Personal details
- Born: Giovanni Domenic Barilaro; 14 November 1971 (age 55) Queanbeyan, New South Wales, Australia
- Party: National
- Spouse: Deanna Barilaro (c. 1995–2021)
- Children: 3 (f)
- Occupation: Small business owner

Giovanni Domenic "John" Barilaro (Italian: [dʒoˈvanni bariˈlaːro]; AKA "Bruz", born 14 November 1971) is an Australian former politician who served as the 18th deputy premier of New South Wales and the leader of the NSW National Party from 2016 to 2021. He was the Minister for Regional New South Wales, Industry and Trade in the second Berejiklian ministry from April 2019, and a member of the New South Wales Legislative Assembly representing the electoral district of Monaro since 2011 until his resignation in October 2021.

Barilaro previously served as the Minister for Regional Development (later renamed Minister for Regional New South Wales), Minister for Small Business, and Minister for Skills in the first Berejiklian and second Baird governments, from October 2014 until March 2019; and as the Minister for Regional Tourism in the first Baird government. In October 2021, he announced his resignation as Deputy Premier, Leader of the National Party and member for Monaro, saying it was "the right time for me to hand the reins over".

He is also known for Barilaro v Shanks-Markovina, a defamation lawsuit brought against Jordan Shanks for Shanks' YouTube channel friendlyjordies, and Google as the publisher of the videos, as well as referring Shanks and a producer to the NSW Police Fixated Persons Unit, causing the producer, Kristo Langker, to be arrested on charges of stalking that were ultimately dismissed in March 2022. The defamation lawsuit resulted in Shanks making an apology to Barilaro in 2021 along with editing some parts of the videos, while Google was ordered to pay him $715,000 in damages.

His attempt at a post-political career as the New South Wales trade commissioner to the United States resulted in a political scandal for NSW Premier Dominic Perrottet, after a series of embarrassing disclosures over Barilaro's creation of the highly paid role prior to his departure from Parliament, and the role of NSW Government ministers and public servants in the process. That process saw the originally successful applicant fired from her public service job. An additional round of applications began, Barilaro was the second ranked candidate prior to discussions with his CV references. He ultimately won the job and had his position confirmed but the scandal erupted in the middle of 2022 and he quit prior to moving to New York. The issue was referred to the NSW Independent Commission Against Corruption, and minister Stuart Ayres resigned from his cabinet role over the matter. Barilaro was involved in a physical altercation with a cameraman in 2022 and was charged with assault; however, the charges were dropped the following year due to concerns over his mental health.

== Early years and background ==
Barilaro was born in Queanbeyan to immigrant parents from Calabria, Italy. After leaving school he worked for his family's business, Ryleho, a business that manufactures energy-efficient timber windows and doors, eventually as manager. He has campaigned within his local community for a high school for the growing suburb of Jerrabomberra, and helped found the Monaro Panthers Football Club, before serving for eight years as its club president.

== Political career ==
=== Early work ===
Barilaro was elected as an independent councillor of Queanbeyan City Council in 2008 and served on the council until he ran for the National Party in the seat of Monaro at the 2011 state election. He won the seat from incumbent Labor Minister Steve Whan with an 8.2-point swing to the Nationals.

Following the resignation of Andrew Stoner in October 2014, Barilaro was appointed to the first Baird ministry as the Minister for Small Business and the Minister for Regional Tourism. Baird rearranged his ministry following the 2015 state election, and Barilaro was sworn in as the Minister for Regional Development, the Minister for Skills, and the Minister for Small Business in the second Baird government.

=== Deputy Premier ===
On 15 November 2016, Barilaro was elected unopposed as leader of the National Party in New South Wales, following the resignation of Troy Grant. Following the resignation of Mike Baird and the election of Gladys Berejiklian as Leader of the New South Wales Liberal Party, Barilaro led The Nationals to form the Liberal-National coalition in the Berejiklian ministry that was sworn in on 23 January 2017.

On 1 December 2017, Barilaro called for Prime Minister Malcolm Turnbull to resign as a "Christmas gift" to Australians. Turnbull subsequently accused Barilaro of "trying to ingratiate himself" with radio presenter Alan Jones. Turnbull also stated he had called Barilaro and left a message after previous criticism, but had not heard back, and suggested Barilaro should have expressed his view to Turnbull personally, rather than "bagging [him] in the media". Several federal ministers, including Julie Bishop and Mathias Cormann were also critical of Barilaro, with Cormann stating: "He is not a federal member of parliament, I don't know him, I have never met him, it is a regrettable comment, it is uncalled for, it is wrong, I reject it".

Following the 2019 state election, Barilaro was sworn in as the Minister for Regional New South Wales, Industry and Trade in the second Berejiklian ministry, with effect from 2 April 2019.

In April 2020, Barilaro expressed anger at fellow Minister Don Harwin after revelations he had traveled to his Central Coast holiday house despite bans on non-essential travel. Barilaro, who led the government's calls for 'city people to stay out of the regions' during the COVID-19 lockdowns, however, was accused of "gross hypocrisy" by members of his own government, after it was revealed he spent a weekend 'on the farm' building a cubby house with his daughter (a 7-bedroom French provincial estate). Following an investigation into the incident, NSW Police ruled Barilaro did not breach coronavirus restrictions by making the trip and in a statement Barilaro said he went to the farm to "feed chickens, mow lawns and tend to maintenance".

In 2023, Barilaro faced criticism from the Auditor-General for his involvement in the Bushfire Local Economic Recovery Program, which the auditor-general described as "lack[ing] integrity".

=== Eden-Monaro bid ===
On 30 April 2020, Barilaro was considering stepping down from State politics to contest the federal seat of Eden-Monaro in its upcoming by-election, following Mike Kelly's immediate resignation from politics owing to personal and familial health issues, but later withdrew his interest. He attributed the decision to a lack of support from Deputy Prime Minister Michael McCormack, whom he accused of fearing him as a leadership rival. Barilaro then apologised for his actions. Barilaro sent minister Andrew Constance an abusive text message while Constance was deliberating running for the by-election. Constance claims Barilaro's message convinced him "politics was stuffed", and he decided not to run.

=== Later years of government ===
In September 2020, Barilaro threatened to move the Nationals to the crossbench in opposition to the government's policy to protect koalas, while National ministers maintained their positions in cabinet. Premier Gladys Berejiklian rejected the offer and gave Nationals ministers an ultimatum to withdraw their threat or be fired. Barilaro subsequently backed down and kept his ministry, though the government later shelved the koala protection bill, viewed as a 'win' for the Nationals at the time, though a 'regression' for koala protection.

An effigy of Barilaro appeared at the 2021 Sydney Gay and Lesbian Mardi Gras, depicting him as sitting inside a barrel; this was a reference to criticisms of "pork barrelling". Barilaro had spoken favourably of being given the nickname "Pork Barilaro", saying that what is typically described as pork barrelling is "actually an investment".

On 24 November 2021, Barilaro delivered his valedictory speech in NSW Parliament in which he closed with "one piece of advice: Be kind to each other. If we have learned anything over the past two years it is to be kind to each other". He officially resigned on 31 December 2021.

=== Friendlyjordies legal cases ===
From the latter half of 2020, YouTube comedian and political journalist Jordan Shanks, known online as friendlyjordies, published a series of videos criticising Barilaro for the 2019–20 bushfire season and accusing him of corruption. He also appeared on stage in a Super Mario costume, at an event which Barilaro was attending. Barilaro publicly expressed offence at Shanks' mocking depictions, where Shanks likens Barilaro to Mario from the Super Mario video games and comments that Barilaro is "powered by spaghetti", citing Barilaro's consistent annual victories at a Queanbeyan spaghetti-eating contest. Barilaro accused the depictions of "racist undertones". In May 2021, Barilaro lodged a defamation claim in the Federal Court against Shanks, as well as Google for refusing to delete the videos. Barilaro cited this case as one of the reasons for his resignation from parliament.

In June 2021, a friendlyjordies producer, Kristo Langker, was arrested by the Fixated Persons Unit of the Counter Terrorism and Special Tactics Command and charged with stalking Barilaro, prompted by Barilaro's complaints to the police; he pleaded not guilty. Police allege he followed Barilaro, repeatedly asking him why he was suing friendlyjordies. Video footage of the incident shows the producer attempting to return legal documents to Barilaro regarding the defamation suit. The producer's lawyer, Mark Davis, states the video of the incident is not consistent with the police statement. Several notable figures have used social media to accuse Barilaro of lying to the police regarding the statement. Former Australian prime minister Kevin Rudd criticised Barilaro for "asking counterterrorism police to round ... up" people he does not like, categorising the friendlyjordies incidents as typical investigative journalism that politicians expect to face. Others criticising the arrest include former Director of Public Prosecutions Nicholas Cowdery, politician Helen Dalton, journalist John Pilger, and Media Watch. In March 2022, police dropped all charges against Langker, and were ordered to pay his legal costs.

Barilaro settled his lawsuit against Shanks on 5 November 2021, with Shanks agreeing to apologise for the videos. Shanks was liable for $100,000 in legal costs in relation to an unsuccessful application to have the case heard by a jury, but Barilaro did not receive any money in the settlement. On 6 June 2022, Google was ordered to pay Barilaro $715,000.

== Post-political career (2021–present) ==
=== Investment NSW appointment ===
After leaving office, Barilaro was appointed to a trade commissioner position in New York by Investment NSW, a government agency within the NSW Department of Industry. Questions were raised about the propriety of this appointment and NSW Government inquiries were established. Senior public servant Jenny West was due to be given the role, before her verbal offer was rescinded by the state government. On 30 June 2022, Barilaro announced he was withdrawing from his role as NSW Trade Commissioner to the Americas, stating that his position had become untenable, due to the intense media scrutiny that his appointment had received. His former chief of staff Mark Connell, gave evidence to the parliamentary inquiry on the matter that Barilaro had said prior to leaving Parliament "I've just come from a meeting with Dom (Perrottet) and Stuart (Ayres) regarding trade and we’re going to bring back the Agent General in London as well as a bunch of other postings around the world. This is it; this is the job for when I get the fuck out of this place."

It was later revealed that, in both the first and second round of recruitment, Barilaro was not the preferred candidate, and won the job in the second round only after his rankings were adjusted following discussions with work references that were eventually revealed to be Gary Barnes, a former senior public servant who reported to Barilaro when Barilaro was a minister, Arthur Sinodinos, who served as the Australian Ambassador to the United States and former NSW Premier Barry O'Farrell, after which chief executive of Investment NSW, Amy Brown, edited the selection panel report to elevate Barilaro to first ranked candidate in the final report published a week after he had signed his contract. The issue was referred to the NSW Independent Commission Against Corruption. Government Minister Stuart Ayres resigned from his cabinet role over the matter on 3 August 2022.

On 23 July 2022, Barilaro was involved in a physical altercation with a television cameraman outside a bar in Manly. The incident was filmed, showing both Barilaro and the cameraman shoving each other. In the days after the attack Barilaro complained about the investigation, saying he was breaking his silence over "being treated like a criminal". The NSW Police opened an investigation, and on 26 August, Barilaro was charged with assault and malicious damage over the attack. He appeared at Manly Local Court on 12 October and pled not guilty. The charges have since been dismissed on the grounds of Barilaro's poor mental health state.

On Monday, 8 August, Barilaro appeared in front of a NSW parliamentary inquiry. On the second day of questioning, Barilaro ceased to cooperate, citing mental health reasons. A separate inquiry chaired by former NSW public service commissioner Graeme Head based on the mandate by the NSW Premier Dominic Perrottet found that the hiring decision was not done at 'arm's length'. In response, Perrottet stated that the recruitment process was 'flawed' and that he is seeking legal advice on whether the matter should be referred to NSW ICAC. The NSW parliamentary inquiry published its interim report on 6 February 2023, concurring with the Head inquiry that the recruitment decision were not made at 'arm's length' and that the appointment had all the hallmarks of 'jobs for the boys' scheme.

=== Leaked audio recordings ===
On 10 March 2023, Friendlyjordies released a video on YouTube, wherein he played leaked audio recordings taken of Barilaro talking with colleagues prior to the 2021 Upper Hunter state by-election, where he admitted to pork barrelling election commitments amounting to over AU$100 million in an effort to win the election. Shanks also published a similar video featuring an extended version of the same conversation, in which Barilaro admitted he was purposefully "making foolish election commitments" to win the seat.

The recordings would not be reported on by any mainstream media outlet, with the exception of the small regional radio station, 2NM. Media Watch host Paul Barry opined that no outlets had covered the story due to the state laws of New South Wales which make it illegal to publish a recording of a private conversation without the person's consent.

== After politics ==
In 2025, Barilaro bought a branch of pest inspection business Resicert and works on the Lower North Shore of Sydney as a building and pest inspector. Barilaro had unsuccessfully sought a job at the City of Griffith council in June 2025.

== Personal life ==
In 2019, Barilaro voiced his support for the decriminalisation of abortion, stating that 30 years earlier he had a girlfriend who had an abortion after she got pregnant while together with Barilaro.

Barilaro's father, Domenico, died in early 2020. Barilaro's aunt, Maria Inzillo, and her husband, Damiani Nesci, died from COVID-19 in December 2020.

In October 2021, Barilaro announced his separation from his wife of 26 years, Deanna. They have three daughters together.

In December 2021, it was revealed Barilaro was in a relationship with his former long-time media adviser Jennifer Lugsdin.

New South Wales Legislative Assembly
Preceded by Steve Whan	Member for Monaro; 2011–2021	Succeeded by Nichole Overall
Political offices
Preceded by Andrew Stoner	Minister for Small Business; 2014–2019	Succeeded by Damien Tudehope as Minister for Finance and Small Business
Preceded by Katrina Hodgkinson as Assistant Minister for Tourism and Major Events	Minister for Regional Tourism; 2014–2015	Succeeded by Stuart Ayres as Minister for Trade, Tourism and Major Events
Vacant Title last held by Verity Firth as Minister for Education and Training	Minister for Skills; 2015–2019	Succeeded by Geoff Lee as Minister for Skills and Tertiary Education
Preceded by Troy Grant as Minister for Regional Infrastructure and Services	Minister for Regional Development / / Minister for Regional New South Wales; 2015–2019	Succeeded by himself as Minister for Regional New South Wales, Industry and Trade
Preceded by Troy Grant	Deputy Premier of New South Wales; 2016–2021	Succeeded by Paul Toole
Preceded by himself as Minister for Regional New South Wales	Minister for Regional New South Wales, Industry and Trade; 2019–2021	Succeeded by Paul Toole as Minister for Regional New South Wales
Preceded by Niall Blair as Minister for Trade and Industry	Minister for Regional New South Wales, Industry and Trade; 2019–2021	Succeeded by Stuart Ayres as Minister for Trade and Industry
Party political offices
Preceded by Troy Grant	Leader of the NSW Nationals; 2016–2021	Succeeded by Paul Toole
