= New South Wales National Party =

- Leader: Gurmesh Singh
- Deputy Leader: Kevin Anderson
- Founded: 1919; 107 years ago
- Preceded by: Progressive Party
- Headquarters: 107 Pitt Street, Sydney, New South Wales, Australia
- Youth wing: Young Nationals
- Membership (2026): ~3,600
- Ideology: Australian conservatism; Agrarianism
- Political position: Centre-right
- National affiliation: Federal Nationals
- Political alliance: Liberal–National Coalition
- Colours: Green and Yellow
- Slogan: "It's Your Time"
- Legislative Assembly: 11 / 93
- Legislative Council: 6 / 42
- House of Representatives: 5 / 47 (NSW seats)
- Senate: 2 / 12 (NSW seats)

Website
- www.nswnationals.org.au

The New South Wales National Party, officially known as the National Party of Australia – N.S.W. (Note: The party name includes the periods in "N.S.W." according to the Australian Electoral Commission.) and commonly known as the NSW Nationals, is an Australian political party in New South Wales which forms the state branch of the federal National Party.

The party has generally been the junior partner in a centre-right Coalition with the NSW branch of the Liberal Party of Australia. Since 1927, the Nationals have been in Coalition with the Liberals and their predecessors, the Nationalist Party of Australia (1927–1931), the United Australia Party (1931–1943), and the Democratic Party (1943–1945). During periods of conservative government, the leader of the Nationals also serves as Deputy Premier of New South Wales. When the conservatives are in opposition, the Liberal and National parties usually form a joint opposition bench. New South Wales is the only state where the Coalition has never been broken, and yet has not merged into a unified non-Labor party.

== History ==
=== Name changes ===
The movement began as the Progressive Party, from the 1922 split until 1925. It then used the name the Country Party until 1977, when it became the National Country Party. The party's name was changed to the National Party of Australia in 1982.

- 13 October 1919 – The Farmers' and Settlers' Association of New South Wales, the NSW Graziers' Association and the People's Party of Soldiers and Citizens meet as the first electoral council of the Progressive Party of New South Wales.
- 15 December 1921 – Split of the Progressive Party between urban and rural wings. Rural wing (known as the "True Blues") continues as the Progressive Party.
- 12 August 1925 – Michael Bruxner announces to the NSW Legislative Assembly that the party has changed its name to the Country Party of New South Wales.
- 24 September 1931 – In order to clarify its support for the New England New State Movement, the party name changes to the United Country Party of New South Wales.
- 9 February 1944 – The State Conference agrees to a further name change as the Australian Country Party (N.S.W.).
- 26 June 1976 – The State Conference held in Broken Hill rejects a proposal to follow the federal party and rename itself as the "National Country Party of Australia – NSW".
- 26 June 1977 – The following State Conference held in Coffs Harbour approves the name change to the National Country Party of Australia – NSW.
- 26 June 1982 – The annual State Conference held in Wagga Wagga approves the name change to the National Party of Australia – NSW. The federal party does not make the same change until its Federal Conference on 16 October.
- 25 October 2003 – The NSW Central Council of the party approves the 11 October decision of the federal executive to use the term, The Nationals, in all state and federal election campaigns.

=== Government (2010s and 2020s) ===
As a measure of the Coalition's then-solidity in NSW, the Liberals won enough seats to theoretically govern alone during the Coalition's massive landslide at the 2011 state election. However, new Premier Barry O'Farrell kept the Nationals in his government.

==== Neo-Nazi infiltration ====
In 2018, the party revealed that approximately 30 members of its youth wing were being investigated for alleged links to neo-Nazism. Federal Nationals leader Michael McCormack denounced these attempts stating that: "The Nationals will not tolerate extremism or the politics of hate. People found to engage with such radicalism are not welcome in our party. We are a grassroots party proudly championing what matters most to our regional and rural communities – always has been, always will be". Several suspected neo-Nazis were expelled from the party and its youth wing. John Barilaro, the leader of the NSW Nationals, also denounced racism and fascism within the party stating that: "I have no problems calling this out, this is something I'm very strong on, I do not accept racism".

==== Planned move to crossbench ====
On 10 September 2020, the Nationals NSW declared that they would no longer support the legislation of the NSW Liberal Party, and would effectively move to the crossbenches in Parliament. This was caused due to a new amendments to planning regulation which looked to class more forested area as koala habitat, restricting land clearing in such areas and increasing compliance for landowners, to which they disagreed with. In response, the Premier, Gladys Berejiklian, threatened to sack Barilaro and his colleagues from cabinet. Less than 24 hours later, on the morning of 11 September 2020, the Nationals backed down and rejoined the government.

On 18 November 2025 Gurmesh Singh and Kevin Anderson were elected leader and deputy leader. Singh become the first person of Sikh descent to lead a major party in Australia.

== Leadership ==
=== Leaders ===
People who served as the Leader of National Party of Australia in New South Wales are:

Leader	Term start	Term end	Time in office	Deputy Premier	Notes
Michael Bruxner	1921	1925	3–4 years	No	
Ernest Buttenshaw	1925	1932	6–7 years	No	
Michael Bruxner	1932	7 May 1958	25–26 years	1932–1941	
Davis Hughes	7 May 1958	26 March 1959	0–1 years	No	
Sir Charles Cutler	26 March 1959	16 December 1975	15–16 years	1965–1975	
Leon Punch	17 December 1975	2 July 1985	9–10 years	1975–1976	
Wal Murray	2 July 1985	26 May 1993	7–8 years	1988–1993	
Ian Armstrong	28 June 1993	14 January 1999	5 years, 200 days	1993–1995	
George Souris	14 January 1999	31 March 2003	4 years, 76 days	No	
Andrew Stoner	31 March 2003	16 October 2014	11 years, 199 days	2011–2014	
Troy Grant	16 October 2014	15 November 2016	2 years, 30 days	2014–2016	
John Barilaro	15 November 2016	6 October 2021	4 years, 325 days	2016–2021	
Paul Toole	6 October 2021	8 May 2023	1 year, 214 days	2021–2023	
Dugald Saunders	8 May 2023	17 November 2025	2 years, 193 days	No	
Gurmesh Singh	18 November 2025	Incumbent	363 days	No	

=== Deputy leaders ===
People who served as the Deputy Leader of National Party of Australia in New South Wales are:

Deputy Leader	Term start	Term end	Time in office	Leader	Notes
William Fleming	1922	1922	0 years	Michael Bruxner	
Ernest Buttenshaw	1922	1925	2–3 years	Michael Bruxner	
William Missingham	1925	1932	6–7 years	Ernest Buttenshaw	
David Drummond	1932	1949	16–17 years	Michael Bruxner	
Roy Vincent	1950	1953	2–3 years	Michael Bruxner	
Doug Dickson	1953	1958	4–5 years	Michael Bruxner	
Charles Cutler	1958	1959	0–1 years	Davis Hughes	
Bill Chaffey	1959	1968	8–9 years	Charles Cutler	
Davis Hughes	1968	1973	4–5 years	Charles Cutler	
Leon Punch	1973	1975	1–2 years	Charles Cutler	
Tim Bruxner	1975	1981	5–6 years	Leon Punch	
Wal Murray	1981	1984	2–3 years	Leon Punch	
Ian Armstrong	4 April 1984	28 June 1993	9 years, 85 days	Wal Murray	
George Souris	28 June 1993	14 January 1999	5 years, 200 days	Ian Armstrong	
John Turner	14 January 1999	31 March 2003	4 years, 76 days	George Souris	
Don Page	31 March 2003	28 March 2007	3 years, 362 days	Andrew Stoner	
Andrew Fraser	28 March 2007	22 October 2008	1 year, 208 days	Andrew Stoner	
Adrian Piccoli	22 October 2008	15 November 2016	8 years, 24 days	Andrew Stoner	
Adrian Piccoli	22 October 2008	15 November 2016	8 years, 24 days	Troy Grant	
Niall Blair	15 November 2016	2 April 2019	2 years, 138 days	John Barilaro	
Paul Toole	29 March 2019	6 October 2021	1 year, 208 days	John Barilaro	
Bronnie Taylor	12 October 2021	20 June 2024	2 years, 252 days	Paul Toole	
Bronnie Taylor	12 October 2021	20 June 2024	2 years, 252 days	Dugald Saunders	
Gurmesh Singh	20 June 2024	17 November 2025	1 year, 150 days	Dugald Saunders	
Kevin Anderson	18 November 2025	Incumbent	363 days	Gurmesh Singh	

== Election results ==
Election	Seats won	±	Total votes	%	Position	Leader
1927	13 / 90	▲4	100,963	8.89%	NP-CP Coalition government	Ernest Buttenshaw
1930	12 / 90	▼1	126,779	9.56%	Opposition	Ernest Buttenshaw
1932	23 / 90	▲11	175,862	13.16%	UAP-CP Coalition government	Michael Bruxner
1935	23 / 90	–	162,178	12.92%	UAP-CP Coalition government	Michael Bruxner
1938	22 / 90	▼1	164,045	13.86%	UAP-CP Coalition government	Michael Bruxner
1941	12 / 90	▼10	153,639	11.05%	Opposition	Michael Bruxner
1944	10 / 90	▼2	131,950	10.41%	Opposition	Michael Bruxner
1947	15 / 90	▲5	162,467	10.22%	Opposition	Michael Bruxner
1950	17 / 94	▲2	144,573	8.97%	Opposition	Michael Bruxner
1953	14 / 94	▼3	179,680	11.6%	Opposition	Michael Bruxner
1956	15 / 94	▲1	172,020	10.16%	Opposition	Michael Bruxner
1959	16 / 94	▲1	148,738	8.71%	Opposition	Charles Cutler
1962	14 / 94	▼2	180,640	9.37%	Opposition	Charles Cutler
1965	16 / 94	▲2	208,826	10.23%	LP-CP Coalition government	Charles Cutler
1968	17 / 94	▲1	229,656	10.62%	LP-CP Coalition government	Charles Cutler
1971	17 / 96	–	193,509	8.65%	LP-CP Coalition government	Charles Cutler
1973	18 / 99	▲1	261,504	10.48%	LP-CP Coalition government	Leon Punch
1976	18 / 99	–	270,603	10.03%	Opposition	Leon Punch
1978	17 / 99	▼1	276,984	9.90%	Opposition	Leon Punch
1981	14 / 99	▼3	314,841	11.21%	Opposition	Leon Punch
1984	15 / 99	▲1	266,095	8.85%	Opposition	Leon Punch
1988	20 / 109	▲5	440,482	13.74%	LP-NP Coalition government	Wal Murray
1991	17 / 99	▼3	324,214	10.52%	LP-NP Minority government	Wal Murray
1995	17 / 99	–	378,878	11.10%	Opposition	Ian Armstrong
1999	13 / 93	▼4	331,343	8.87%	Opposition	George Souris
2003	12 / 93	▼1	368,004	9.63%	Opposition	George Souris
2007	13 / 93	▲1	396,023	10.05%	Opposition	Andrew Stoner
2011	18 / 93	▲5	521,864	12.56%	LP-NP Coalition government	Andrew Stoner
2015	17 / 93	▼1	464,653	10.55%	LP-NP Coalition government	Troy Grant
2019	13 / 93	▼4	436,806	9.60%	LP-NP Coalition government	John Barilaro
2023	11 / 93	▼2	403,962	8.59%	Opposition	Paul Toole
