= Electoral results for the district of Cronulla =

Election results for Cronulla, New South Wales, Australia

Cronulla, an electoral district of the Legislative Assembly in the Australian state of New South Wales, has existed from 1959 until the present.

== Members for Cronulla ==
Election	Member	Party
1959	Ian Griffith	Liberal
1962	Ian Griffith	Liberal
1965	Ian Griffith	Liberal
1968	Ian Griffith	Liberal
1971	Ian Griffith	Liberal
1973	Ian Griffith	Liberal
1976	Ian Griffith	Liberal
1978	Michael Egan	Labor
1981	Michael Egan	Labor
1984	Malcolm Kerr	Liberal
1988	Malcolm Kerr	Liberal
1991	Malcolm Kerr	Liberal
1995	Malcolm Kerr	Liberal
1999	Malcolm Kerr	Liberal
2003	Malcolm Kerr	Liberal
2007	Malcolm Kerr	Liberal
2011	Mark Speakman	Liberal
2015	Mark Speakman	Liberal
2019	Mark Speakman	Liberal
2023	Mark Speakman	Liberal

== Election results ==
=== Elections in the 2020s ===
==== 2023 ====
2023 New South Wales state election: Cronulla
Party	Candidate	Votes	%	±%
Liberal	Mark Speakman	28,505	54.18	−9.34
Labor	Paul Constance	14,468	27.50	+4.30
Greens	Catherine Dyson	4,585	8.71	+1.30
One Nation	Craig Ibbotson	3,197	6.08	+6.08
Sustainable Australia	Richard Moran	1,012	1.92	−0.55
Informed Medical Options	Domna Giannakis	845	1.61	+1.61
Total formal votes		52,612	97.68	+0.20
Informal votes		1,251	2.32	−0.20
Turnout		53,863	91.41	−0.19
Two-party-preferred result
Liberal	Mark Speakman	30,407	63.79	−5.82
Labor	Paul Constance	17,263	36.21	+5.82
Liberal hold		Swing	−5.82	

=== Elections in the 2010s ===
==== 2019 ====
2019 New South Wales state election: Cronulla
Party	Candidate	Votes	%	±%
Liberal	Mark Speakman	32,484	63.52	+1.57
Labor	Teressa Farhart	11,866	23.20	+1.30
Greens	Jon Doig	3,789	7.41	−1.69
Keep Sydney Open	Phillip Burriel	1,738	3.40	+3.40
Sustainable Australia	Richard Moran	1,264	2.47	+2.47
Total formal votes		51,141	97.48	+0.47
Informal votes		1,321	2.52	−0.47
Turnout		52,462	91.60	−1.38
Two-party-preferred result
Liberal	Mark Speakman	33,349	69.61	−1.32
Labor	Teressa Farhart	14,556	30.39	+1.32
Liberal hold		Swing	−1.32	

==== 2015 ====
2015 New South Wales state election: Cronulla
Party	Candidate	Votes	%	±%
Liberal	Mark Speakman	31,189	61.9	−3.1
Labor	Peter Scaysbrook	11,029	21.9	+2.3
Greens	Nathan Hunt	4,580	9.1	+0.3
Christian Democrats	George Capsis	2,571	5.1	+1.8
No Land Tax	Christie Mortimer	978	1.9	+1.9
Total formal votes		50,347	97.0	+0.1
Informal votes		1,550	3.0	−0.1
Turnout		51,897	93.0	+1.4
Two-party-preferred result
Liberal	Mark Speakman	32,788	70.9	−3.9
Labor	Peter Scaysbrook	13,436	29.1	+3.9
Liberal hold		Swing	−3.9	

==== 2011 ====
2011 New South Wales state election: Cronulla
Party	Candidate	Votes	%	±%
Liberal	Mark Speakman	29,845	66.1	+9.4
Labor	Stefanie Jones	8,653	19.2	−6.9
Greens	Josh Peacock	3,681	8.1	+1.3
Christian Democrats	Beth Smith	1,571	3.5	−1.1
Independent	Patricia Poulos	1,424	3.2	+3.2
Total formal votes		45,174	97.2	−0.5
Informal votes		1,291	2.8	+0.5
Turnout		46,465	93.3	−0.1
Two-party-preferred result
Liberal	Mark Speakman	31,382	75.5	+8.1
Labor	Stefanie Jones	10,157	24.5	−8.1
Liberal hold		Swing	+8.1	

=== Elections in the 2000s ===
==== 2007 ====
2007 New South Wales state election: Cronulla
Party	Candidate	Votes	%	±%
Liberal	Malcolm Kerr	24,339	56.7	+10.7
Labor	Paul Constance	11,195	26.1	−3.1
Greens	Naomi Waizer	2,948	6.9	+1.5
Christian Democrats	Beth Smith	1,963	4.6	+2.1
AAFI	Warren Feinbier	1,299	3.0	+1.2
Independent	John Moffat	1,193	2.8	+2.7
Total formal votes		42,937	97.7	−0.1
Informal votes		1,013	2.3	+0.1
Turnout		43,950	93.4	
Two-party-preferred result
Liberal	Malcolm Kerr	26,363	67.5	+8.7
Labor	Paul Constance	12,708	32.5	−8.7
Liberal hold		Swing	+8.7	

==== 2003 ====
2003 New South Wales state election: Cronulla
Party	Candidate	Votes	%	±%
Liberal	Malcolm Kerr	18,669	45.9	+1.0
Labor	Scott Docherty	11,549	28.4	−6.5
Independent	Tracie Sonda	5,836	14.4	+14.4
Greens	John Vlamitsopoulos	2,173	5.3	+0.6
Christian Democrats	Beth Smith	1,046	2.6	+0.1
AAFI	Warren Feinbier	761	1.9	+0.3
One Nation	Renata McCallum	394	1.0	−6.6
Unity	Siu Au	206	0.5	+0.5
Total formal votes		40,634	97.8	+0.0
Informal votes		911	2.2	−0.0
Turnout		41,545	92.7	
Two-party-preferred result
Liberal	Malcolm Kerr	20,402	59.3	+4.2
Labor	Scott Docherty	14,024	40.7	−4.2
Liberal hold		Swing	+4.2	

=== Elections in the 1990s ===
==== 1999 ====
1999 New South Wales state election: Cronulla
Party	Candidate	Votes	%	±%
Liberal	Malcolm Kerr	18,160	44.9	−5.5
Labor	Scott Docherty	14,123	34.9	+5.8
One Nation	Jack Manasserian	3,057	7.6	+7.6
Greens	Cathy Power	1,885	4.7	+4.7
Democrats	Roy Day	1,148	2.8	−0.2
Christian Democrats	Malcolm Smith	1,015	2.5	+0.4
AAFI	Warren Feinbier	632	1.6	−1.6
Independent	Patricia Poulos	404	1.0	+1.0
Total formal votes		40,424	97.8	+1.5
Informal votes		892	2.2	−1.5
Turnout		41,316	93.0	
Two-party-preferred result
Liberal	Malcolm Kerr	19,785	55.1	−5.2
Labor	Scott Docherty	16,137	44.9	+5.2
Liberal hold		Swing	−5.2	

==== 1995 ====
1995 New South Wales state election: Cronulla
Party	Candidate	Votes	%	±%
Liberal	Malcolm Kerr	16,925	49.3	−8.5
Labor	Noreen Solomon	9,847	28.7	−5.1
Independent	Byron Hurst	4,668	13.6	+13.6
AAFI	Peter Smith	1,103	3.2	+3.2
Democrats	Valerie Bush	1,077	3.1	−5.3
Call to Australia	Malcolm Smith	710	2.1	+2.1
Total formal votes		34,330	96.4	+4.3
Informal votes		1,288	3.6	−4.3
Turnout		35,618	93.9	
Two-party-preferred result
Liberal	Malcolm Kerr	18,928	59.8	−1.5
Labor	Noreen Solomon	12,734	40.2	+1.5
Liberal hold		Swing	−1.5	

==== 1991 ====
1991 New South Wales state election: Cronulla
Party	Candidate	Votes	%	±%
Liberal	Malcolm Kerr	18,722	57.8	+3.8
Labor	Tony Brownlow	10,944	33.8	+2.6
Democrats	Terri Richardson	2,719	8.4	+8.4
Total formal votes		32,385	92.1	−5.4
Informal votes		2,784	7.9	+5.4
Turnout		35,169	93.8	
Two-party-preferred result
Liberal	Malcolm Kerr	19,396	61.3	0.0
Labor	Tony Brownlow	12,252	38.7	0.0
Liberal hold		Swing	0.0	

=== Elections in the 1980s ===
==== 1988 ====
1988 New South Wales state election: Cronulla
Party	Candidate	Votes	%	±%
Liberal	Malcolm Kerr	15,632	52.7	+2.2
Labor	Thomas Brownlow	8,649	29.2	−20.4
Independent	Carol Provan	5,381	18.1	+18.1
Total formal votes		29,662	97.7	−0.7
Informal votes		706	2.3	+0.7
Turnout		30,368	94.7	
Two-party-preferred result
Liberal	Malcolm Kerr	17,147	61.6	+11.1
Labor	Thomas Brownlow	10,694	38.4	−11.1
Liberal hold		Swing	+11.1	

==== 1984 ====
1984 New South Wales state election: Cronulla
Party	Candidate	Votes	%	±%
Liberal	Malcolm Kerr	14,644	50.5	+5.8
Labor	Michael Egan	14,375	49.5	−5.8
Total formal votes		29,019	98.3	+0.2
Informal votes		490	1.7	−0.2
Turnout		29,509	92.7	+1.2
Liberal gain from Labor		Swing	+5.8	

==== 1981 ====
1981 New South Wales state election: Cronulla
Party	Candidate	Votes	%	±%
Labor	Michael Egan	15,406	55.3	−3.3
Liberal	Stephen Mutch	12,435	44.7	+3.3
Total formal votes		27,841	98.1	
Informal votes		549	1.9	
Turnout		28,390	91.5	
Labor hold		Swing	−3.3	

=== Elections in the 1970s ===
==== 1978 ====
1978 New South Wales state election: Cronulla
Party	Candidate	Votes	%	±%
Labor	Michael Egan	18,029	58.6	+13.5
Liberal	Dennis Porter	12,749	41.4	−9.8
Total formal votes		30,778	98.1	−0.8
Informal votes		603	1.9	+0.8
Turnout		31,381	93.2	−0.8
Labor gain from Liberal		Swing	+12.4	

==== 1976 ====
1976 New South Wales state election: Cronulla
Party	Candidate	Votes	%	±%
Liberal	Ian Griffith	15,960	51.2	+0.4
Labor	Michael Egan	14,045	45.1	+4.9
Workers	Ian Scott	1,147	3.7	+3.7
Total formal votes		31,152	98.9	+0.3
Informal votes		337	1.1	−0.3
Turnout		31,489	94.0	−0.1
Two-party-preferred result
Liberal	Ian Griffith	16,763	53.8	−0.9
Labor	Michael Egan	14,389	46.2	+0.9
Liberal hold		Swing	−0.9	

==== 1973 ====
1973 New South Wales state election: Cronulla
Party	Candidate	Votes	%	±%
Liberal	Ian Griffith	14,782	50.8	+0.7
Labor	Michael Egan	11,686	40.2	−2.0
Australia	Marjory Gray	1,936	6.6	+6.6
Democratic Labor	Bernard Forshaw	700	2.4	+2.4
Total formal votes		29,104	98.6	
Informal votes		423	1.4	
Turnout		29,527	94.1	
Two-party-preferred result
Liberal	Ian Griffith	15,923	54.7	+2.2
Labor	Michael Egan	13,181	45.3	−2.2
Liberal hold		Swing	+2.2	

==== 1971 ====
1971 New South Wales state election: Cronulla
Party	Candidate	Votes	%	±%
Liberal	Ian Griffith	13,683	50.1	−9.1
Labor	Michael Egan	11,510	42.2	+6.7
Defence of Government Schools	Robin Alleway	2,097	7.7	+7.7
Total formal votes		27,290	98.6	
Informal votes		386	1.4	
Turnout		27,676	94.7	
Two-party-preferred result
Liberal	Ian Griffith	14,314	52.5	−8.4
Labor	Michael Egan	12,976	47.5	+8.4
Liberal hold		Swing	−8.4	

=== Elections in the 1960s ===
==== 1968 ====
1968 New South Wales state election: Cronulla
Party	Candidate	Votes	%	±%
Liberal	Ian Griffith	15,231	59.2	−2.9
Labor	John Cudmore	9,126	35.5	+0.8
Democratic Labor	Kevin Ryan	750	2.9	+2.9
Communist	Alexander Elphinston	622	2.4	−0.8
Total formal votes		25,729	97.7	
Informal votes		601	2.3	
Turnout		26,330	94.8	
Two-party-preferred result
Liberal	Ian Griffith	15,955	62.0	−0.7
Labor	John Cudmore	9,774	38.0	+0.7
Liberal hold		Swing	−0.7	

==== 1965 ====
1965 New South Wales state election: Cronulla
Party	Candidate	Votes	%	±%
Liberal	Ian Griffith	17,023	62.1	+0.9
Labor	Wallace Page	9,528	34.7	−4.1
Communist	Alexander Elphinston	878	3.2	+3.2
Total formal votes		27,429	98.7	−0.3
Informal votes		365	1.3	+0.3
Turnout		27,794	94.9	+0.1
Two-party-preferred result
Liberal	Ian Griffith	17,199	62.7	+1.5
Labor	Wallace Page	10,230	37.3	−1.5
Liberal hold		Swing	+1.5	

==== 1962 ====
1962 New South Wales state election: Cronulla
Party	Candidate	Votes	%	±%
Liberal	Ian Griffith	15,618	61.2	+0.6
Labor	Francis Russell	9,919	38.8	−0.6
Total formal votes		25,537	99.0	
Informal votes		250	1.0	
Turnout		25,787	94.8	
Liberal hold		Swing	+0.6	

=== Elections in the 1950s ===
==== 1959 ====
1959 New South Wales state election: Cronulla
Party	Candidate	Votes	%	±%
Liberal	Ian Griffith	13,085	60.6	
Labor	Gordon Neilson	8,498	39.4	
Total formal votes		21,583	98.9	
Informal votes		249	1.1	
Turnout		21,832	95.5	
Liberal notional hold				

Ian Griffith (Liberal) was the member for Sutherland.
