= Speakman shadow ministry =

2023–2025 shadow cabinet in NSW, Australia

The shadow ministry of Mark Speakman was the Coalition shadow cabinet between April 2023 and November 2025. It was the opposition to the Minns government in the Parliament of New South Wales and was led by Mark Speakman following his election as leader of the party and NSW Leader of the Opposition following a leadership election on 21 April 2023. The shadow ministry lasted until the resignation of Speakman and Dugald Saunders as Liberal and National party leaders in November 2025.

== Final arrangement ==
Colour key
(for political parties)
Liberal
National

Shadow Minister	Portfolio	Image
Mark Speakman MP	Leader of the Opposition; Leader of the New South Wales Liberal Party	
Dugald Saunders MP	Shadow Minister for Regional NSW; Shadow Minister for Agriculture and Natural Resources; Leader of the New South Wales National Party	
Natalie Ward MLC	Deputy Leader of the Opposition; Shadow Minister for Transport and Roads; Shadow Minister for Infrastructure; Shadow Minister for the Illawarra and South Coast; Deputy Leader of the Liberal Party in New South Wales	
Gurmesh Singh MP	Shadow Minister for Regional Health; Shadow Minister for Emergency Services; Shadow Minister for the North Coast; Deputy Leader of the National Party in New South Wales (from 28 June 2024)	
Damien Tudehope MLC	Leader of the Opposition in the Legislative Council; Shadow Treasurer; Shadow Minister for Industrial Relations	
Sarah Mitchell MLC	Shadow Minister for Education and Early Learning; Shadow Minister for Western NSW	
Robyn Preston MP	Deputy Leader of the Opposition in the Legislative Assembly; Shadow Minister for Mental Health and Medical Research; Shadow Minister for Veterans	
Alister Henskens MP	Shadow Attorney-General; Manager of Opposition Business in the Legislative Assembly	
Natasha Maclaren-Jones MLC	Shadow Minister for Families and Communities; Shadow Minister for Disability Inclusion; Shadow Minister for Homelessness; Shadow Minister for Youth	
Scott Farlow MLC	Shadow Minister for Planning and Public Spaces; Shadow Minister for Housing; Shadow Minister for Cities; Shadow Minister for Hunter and the Central Coast	
Paul Toole MP	Shadow Minister for Police	
Kellie Sloane MP	Shadow Minister for Health	
James Griffin MP	Shadow Minister for Energy and Climate Change; Shadow Minister for Customer Service and Digital Government; Shadow Minister for the Environment	
Mark Coure MP	Shadow Minister for Multiculturalism; Shadow Minister for Jobs, Industry, Innovation, Science and Technology; Shadow Minister for South-Western Sydney	
Kevin Anderson MP	Shadow Minister for Gaming and Racing; Shadow Minister for the Arts and Heritage	
Wendy Tuckerman MP	Shadow Minister for Local Government	
Eleni Petinos MP	Shadow Minister for Finance; Shadow Minister for Sport	
Justin Clancy MP	Shadow Minister for Skills, TAFE and Tertiary Education	
Mark Taylor MP	Shadow Minister for Corrections; Shadow Minister for Western Sydney	
Steph Cooke MP	Shadow Minister for Water; Shadow Minister for Crown Lands	
Tim James MP	Shadow Minister for Fair Trading, Work Health and Safety and Building; Shadow Minister for Small Business	
Aileen MacDonald MLC	Shadow Minister for Youth Justice	
Dave Layzell MP	Shadow Minister for Regional Transport and Roads (from 12 February 2024)	
Adam Crouch MP	Shadow Minister for Corrections; Shadow Minister for the Central Coast	
Felicity Wilson MP	Shadow Minister for Women; Shadow Minister for Aboriginal Affairs	
Geoff Provest MP	Shadow Minister for Flood Recovery; Shadow Minister for Seniors	
Chris Rath MLC	Shadow Special Minister of State; Opposition Whip in the Legislative Council	
Former Shadow Ministers
Sam Farraway MLC	Shadow Minister for Regional Transport and Roads (from 9 May 2023 to 12 February 2024)	
Bronnie Taylor MLC	Shadow Minister for Regional Health (from 9 May 2023 to 28 June 2024); Shadow Minister for Trade (from 9 May 2023 to 28 June 2024); Shadow Minister for Seniors (from 9 May 2023 to 28 June 2024); Deputy Leader of the National Party in New South Wales (from 12 October 2021 to 28 June 2024)	
Matt Kean MP	Shadow Minister for Health (from 3 May 2023 to 24 June 2024)	
Leslie Williams MP	Shadow Minister for Women; Shadow Minister for Prevention of Domestic Violence and Sexual Assault; Shadow Minister for Aboriginal Affairs	

== Interim arrangement ==
The interim arrangement lasted between 21 April and 9 May 2023 before the full shadow ministry was announced.

Colour key
(for political parties)
Liberal
National

Shadow Minister	Portfolio	Image
Mark Speakman MP	Leader of the Opposition; Leader of the Liberal Party in New South Wales	
Paul Toole MP	Shadow Minister for Police; Shadow Minister for Regional New South Wales; Leader of the National Party in New South Wales	
Bronnie Taylor MLC	Shadow Minister for Regional Health; Deputy Leader of the National Party in New South Wales	
Damien Tudehope MLC	Leader of the Opposition in the Legislative Council	
Alister Henskens MP	Shadow Attorney-General; Manager of Opposition Business in the Legislative Assembly	
Matt Kean MP	Shadow Minister for Health	
