= 2023 New South Wales Liberal Party leadership election =

Australian state party leadership race

2023 Liberal Party of Australia (New South Wales Division) leadership election
- 21 April 2023
- Leadership election
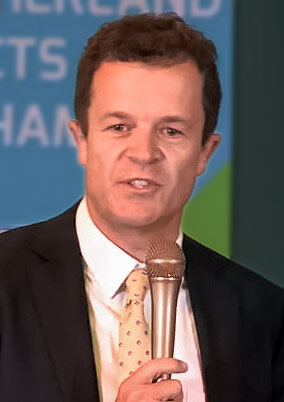

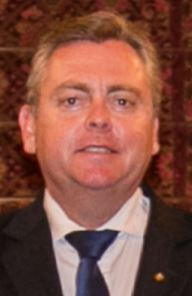
Candidate	Mark Speakman	Anthony Roberts
Caucus vote	22	13
Percentage	62.85%	37.14%
Seat	Cronulla	Lane Cove
Faction	Moderate	Conservative
Leader before election
Dominic Perrottet
Elected Leader
Mark Speakman
- Deputy leadership election
Candidate	Natalie Ward	Wendy Tuckerman
Caucus vote	27	8
Percentage	77.14%	22.86%
Seat	MLC	Goulburn
Faction	Moderate	Unknown
Deputy Leader before election
Matt Kean
Elected Deputy Leader
Natalie Ward
- Upper House leadership election
Candidate	Damien Tudehope
Caucus vote	Unopposed
Faction	Conservative
Legislative Council Leader before election
Damien Tudehope
Elected Legislative Council Leader
Damien Tudehope

The 2023 New South Wales Liberal Party leadership election was held on 21 April 2023 following the party's defeat by Labor at the 2023 election, which resulted in the resignation of leader and former premier Dominic Perrottet. Mark Speakman (of the party's Moderate faction) and Anthony Roberts (of the Right faction) were the two declared candidates. Speakman defeated Roberts by 22 votes (62.86%) to 13 (37.14%). For the deputy leadership, Natalie Ward defeated Wendy Tuckerman by 27 votes (77.14%) to eight (22.86%) after the party overwhelmingly voted to allow members of both houses to run for the deputy leadership.

== Background ==
Dominic Perrottet became Premier of New South Wales in 2021 after the resignation of Gladys Berejiklian following an inquiry from the Independent Commission against Corruption (ICAC). Perrottet's leadership and policies came under scrutiny during the election campaign, with some critics blaming him for the government's handling of issues such as the COVID-19 pandemic and some calling for his resignation following revelations that he wore a Nazi uniform to his 21st birthday. On election night, Perrottet conceded to Chris Minns from Labor Party and resigned as the leader of the New South Wales Liberal Party.

The National Party also held two leadership spills. In the first spill, Paul Toole survived and was re-elected against Dubbo MP Dugald Saunders. In the second spill, Toole lost and was replaced by Saunders.

== Results ==
=== Leadership ===
Votes by member
Speakman	Roberts	Unknown
Mark Speakman (MLA for Cronulla)	Anthony Roberts (MLA for Lane Cove)	

=== Deputy leadership ===
Votes by member
Ward	Tuckerman	Unknown
Natalie Ward (MLC); Mark Speakman (MLA for Cronulla); Damien Tudehope (MLC)	Wendy Tuckerman (MLA for Goulburn)	

== Candidates ==
=== Leader ===
==== Declared ====
- Anthony Roberts MP (Lane Cove, 2003–present), Minister for Planning and Homes (2021–2023)
- Mark Speakman MP (Cronulla, 2011–present), Attorney-General of New South Wales (2017–2023)

==== Declined ====
- Matt Kean MP (Hornsby, 2011–2024), Treasurer of New South Wales (2021–2023), Deputy Leader of the Liberal Party
- James Griffin MP (Manly, 2017–present), Minister for Environment and Heritage (2021–2023)

=== Deputy leader ===
==== Declared ====
- Tanya Davies MP (Badgerys Creek, 2011–present), Minister for Mental Health, Women, and Ageing (2017–2019)
- Felicity Wilson MP (North Shore, 2017–present), Parliamentary secretary to the treasurer and for COVID recovery (2021–2023)

=== Legislative Council leader ===
==== Declared ====
- Damien Tudehope MLC (2019–present), the previous Legislative Council leader

=== Withdrew ===
- Natalie Ward MLC (2017–present), Minister for Metropolitan Roads, Women's Safety and the Prevention of Domestic and Sexual Violence (2021–2023)
