= 2023 New South Wales National Party leadership spills =

Australian political party leadership elections

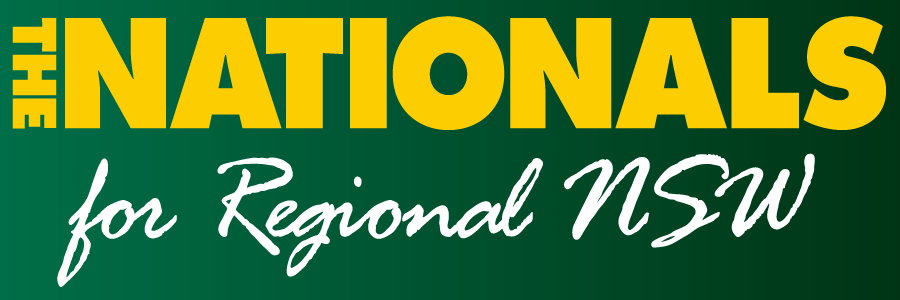
- First spill
- 5 April 2023
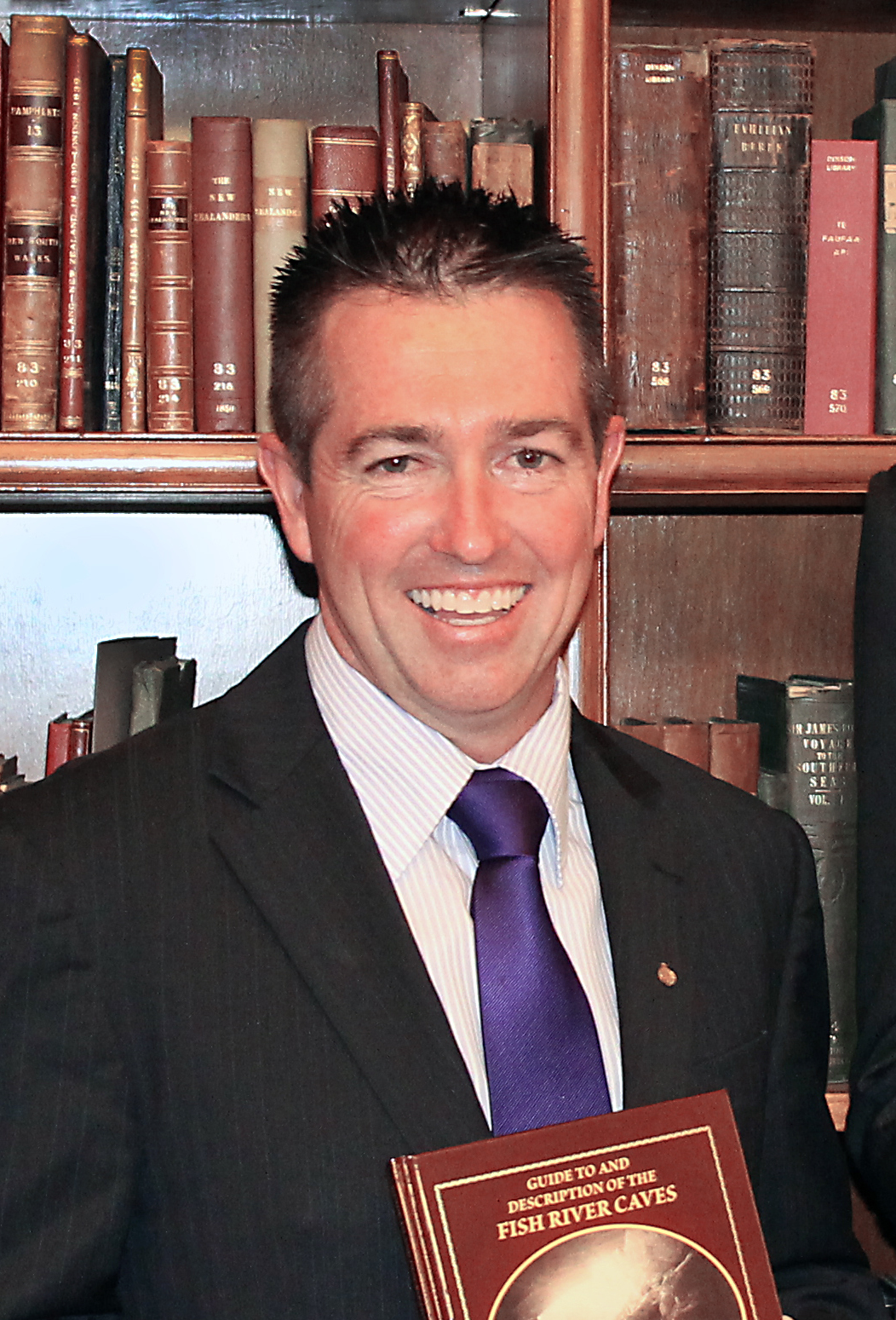
		NAT
Nominee	Paul Toole	Dugald Saunders
Caucus vote	8	7
Percentage	53.33%	46.66%
Seat	Bathurst	Dubbo
Leader before election
Paul Toole
Elected Leader
Paul Toole
- Second spill
- 8 May 2023
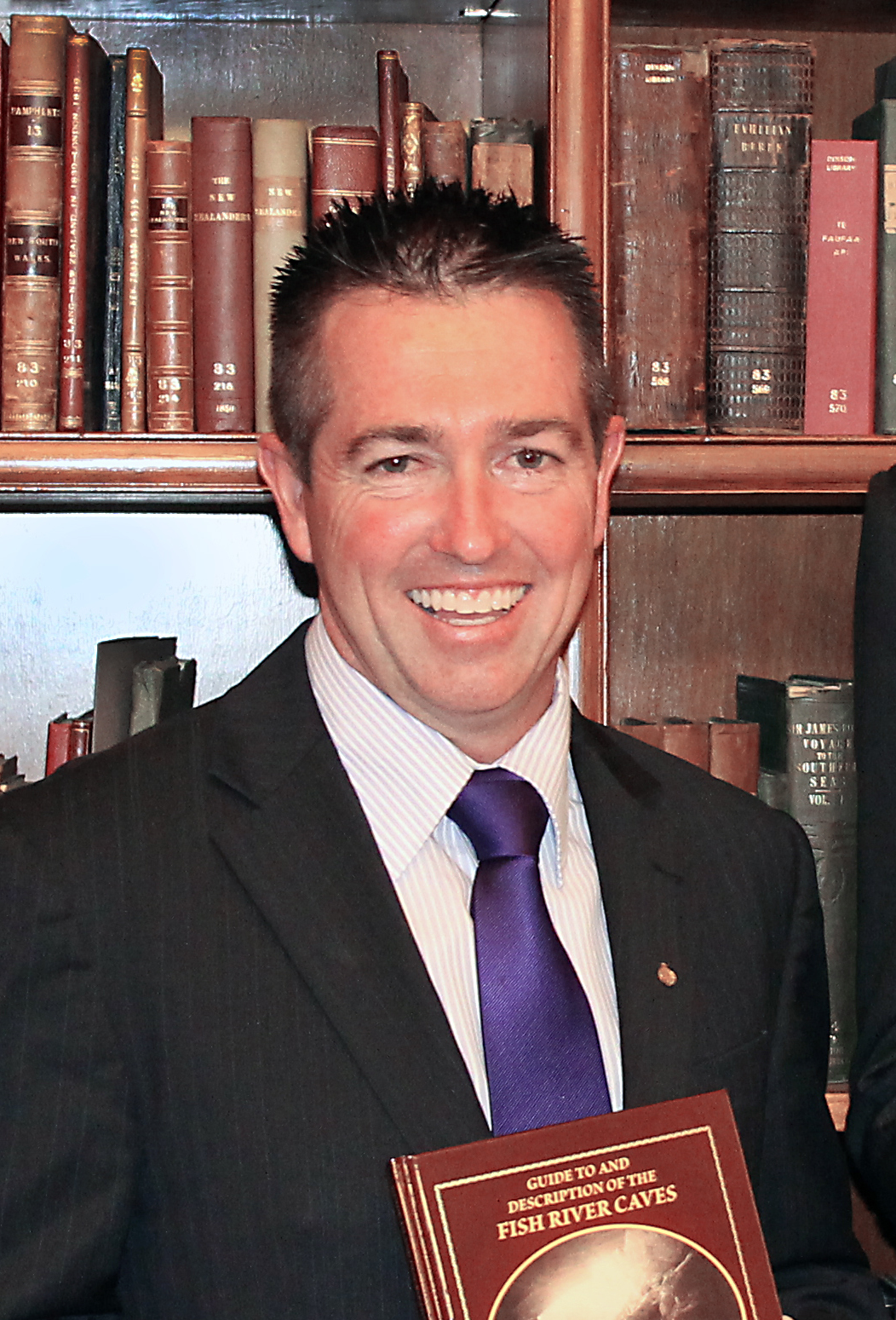
	NAT
Nominee	Dugald Saunders	Paul Toole
Caucus vote	10	5
Percentage	66.7%	33.3%
Seat	Dubbo	Bathurst
Leader before election
Paul Toole
Elected Leader
Dugald Saunders

The 2023 New South Wales National Party leadership spills were a series of leadership spills held following the 2023 state election, where the Liberal-National Coalition lost power and returned to Opposition for the first time in 12 years.

The first spill was held on 5 April 2023. Although incumbent leader Paul Toole was challenged by Dugald Saunders, Toole remained leader, winning the ballot eight votes to seven, with one informal vote. Bronnie Taylor remained deputy leader.

The Nationals' senior Coalition partner, the Liberal Party, also later held a leadership election following the resignation of Dominic Perrottet. Mark Speakman won the state's Liberal leadership, Natalie Ward won the state's deputy leadership and Damien Tudehope was re-elected Upper House leader.

Following Ben Franklin's decision to nominate as Upper House President, a second spill was held on 8 May 2023. Saunders successfully replaced Toole as leader.

== Background ==
At the 2023 state election, the Nationals lost one seat and had a 1% swing against them. Dominic Perrottet, the defeated Premier, resigned as the state's Liberal leader following the loss, which saw Labor win a minority government.

In 2021, the Nationals had a leadership election due to the resignation of former Deputy Premier John Barilaro, which followed the resignation of several Coalition MPs, including the Liberal leader and then-Premier Gladys Berejiklian. Perrottet was elected Liberal leader (and thus Premier), while Toole was elected Nationals leader (and thus Deputy Premier).

Due to Perrottet's resignation, there was speculation that the Nationals would also have a leadership spill. Saunders refused to comment at the time. A day before the spill, Coffs Harbour MP Gurmesh Singh said that he was aware that Saunders intended to challenge the party's leadership.

In May, Ben Franklin, a member of the National Party, controversially nominated to become President of the New South Wales Legislative Council. Controversy surrounding Toole's role in the bid saw another spill held on 8 May, which saw Saunders elected.

== Result ==
=== First spill ===
2023 New South Wales National Party leadership spill: first spill
Party	Candidate	Votes	%	±%
National	Paul Toole	8	55.33	
National	Dugald Saunders	7	46.66	
Total formal votes		15	93.75	
Informal votes		1	6.25	
Total votes		16	100.00	

Votes by member
Toole	Saunders	Unknown
Paul Toole (MLA for Bathurst); Bronnie Taylor (MLC); Sarah Mitchell (MLC); Gurmesh Singh (MLA for Coffs Harbour)	Dugald Saunders (MLA for Dubbo)	

=== Second spill ===
2023 New South Wales National Party leadership spill: second spill
Party	Candidate	Votes	%	±%
National	Dugald Saunders	10	66.67	+20.01
National	Paul Toole	5	33.33	−20.01
Total formal votes		15	93.75	
Informal votes		1	6.25	
Total votes		16	100.00	

Votes by member
Saunders	Toole	Unknown
Dugald Saunders (MLA for Dubbo)	Paul Toole (MLA for Bathurst)	

== Aftermath ==
=== First spill ===
After winning the first spill, Toole stated:

"At the end of the day it's been a party room decision that's been made by my colleagues. I'm really honoured to be given the opportunity to continue to serve in this role over the next four years."

Toole also reflected on the party's performance at the state election, which he said was satisfactory, also pointing out that in seven of the eleven Nationals seats in the state their margin increased, despite losing one seat (Monaro).

Toole later said that the Liberal Party were responsible for the election loss, saying at a press conference:

"If you look at the results, the National Party lost one seat. For me, that's still very disappointing. If the Liberal Party only lost one seat, then we'd be in government today. The National Party actually held up its own and actually performed extremely well in the last election. There's a number of things, and I'm not going to get into Liberal Party matters, that's a matter for the Liberal Party now to determine over the coming weeks. But we do know that the National Party actually had candidates on the ground well and truly in advance of that state election. That's important. You need local champions, you need local people, who are going to be on the ground working on behalf of those communities in each of those areas. At the end of the day, they should have a look at the success of the National Party and I'm sure there's a lot of learnings they can take from that."

Toole also said that he is still "mates" with Saunders and can still "work closely" with him, even after the spill.

=== Second spill ===
Saunders thanked the party for electing him as leader and also thanked Toole for his leadership.
