= 2025 New South Wales Liberal Party leadership election =

Australian state political party election

- 21 November 2025
- Leadership election
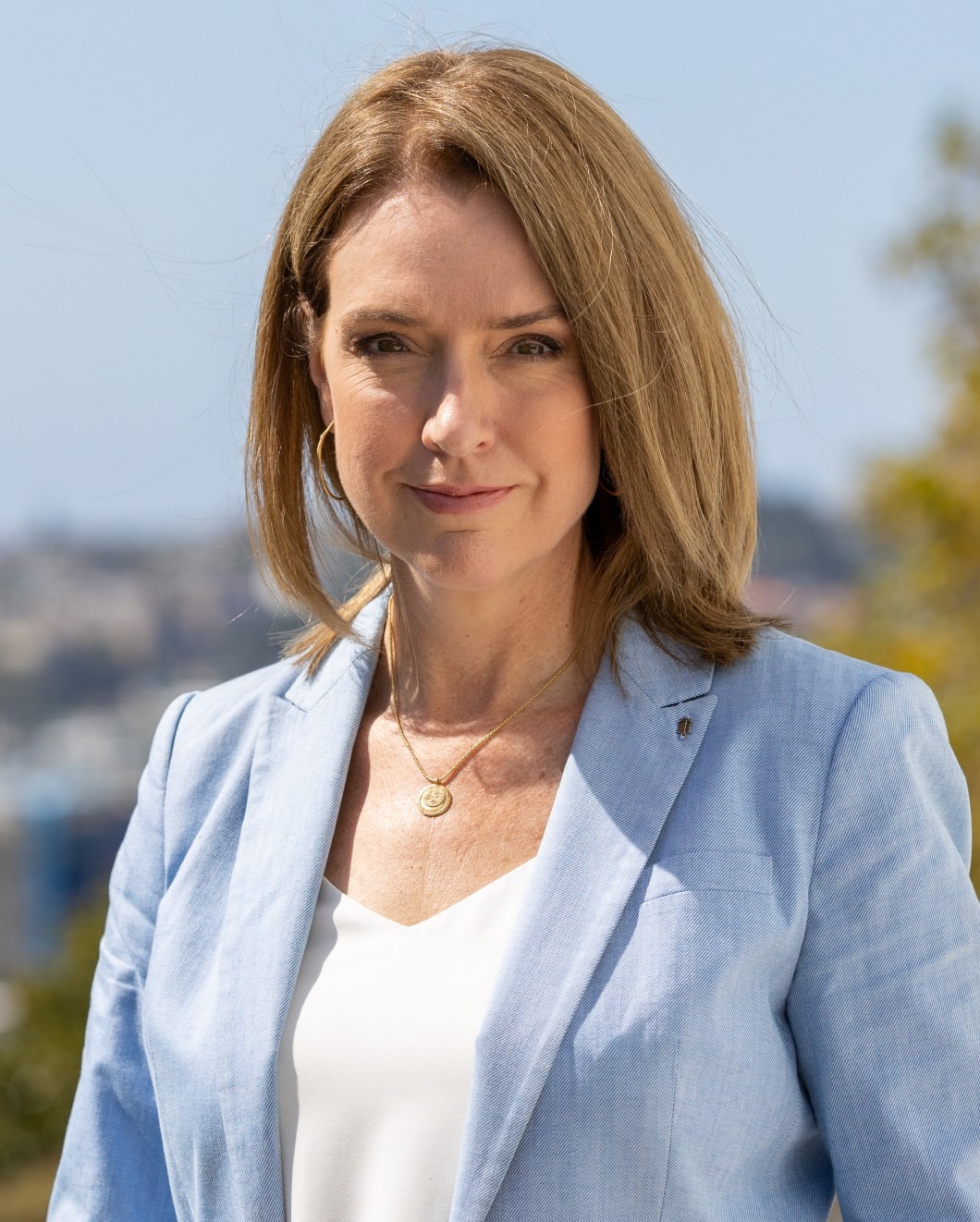
Candidate	Kellie Sloane
Caucus vote	Unopposed
Seat	Vaucluse
Faction	Moderate
Leader before election
Mark Speakman
Elected Leader
Kellie Sloane

The 2025 New South Wales Liberal Party leadership election was held on 21 November 2025 to elect the leader of the New South Wales Liberal Party and, ex officio, Leader of the Opposition. Kellie Sloane was elected unopposed.

It is the second leadership election within the NSW Liberal–National Coalition in the span of one week. It is also the third leadership election taking place within state and territory Liberal Party branches in November 2025 (following the 2025 Canberra Liberals leadership election and 2025 Victorian Liberal Party leadership spill).

This election did not result in any changes to the party's deputy or upper house (Legislative Council) leadership. This means that the Liberal leader and deputy leader will both be female. The deputy remains as Natalie Ward and the upper house leader will continue to be Damien Tudehope.

== Background ==
In mid-November, The Sydney Morning Herald reported that Wahroonga MP Alister Henskens had been calling colleagues to seek their support for a potential leadership spill. He failed to attract enough support from moderate MPs. The potential leadership challenge caused speculation as to whether Mark Speakman would resign as leader.

On 20 November 2025, following rifts in leadership and slipping poll performance, Speakman resigned as leader of the New South Wales Liberal Party. He endorsed Kellie Sloane, shadow health minister and MP for Vaucluse, to succeed him.

According to the Australian Financial Review, Sloane has the support of at least 19 of the 33 members eligible to vote in the election. The Sydney Morning Herald reported that Sloane has the support of the entire Centre Right faction and almost all of the Moderate faction, while Henskens has near unanimous support from the Right faction.

On 21 November 2025, ABC News reported that Henskens had withdrawn his bid for the leadership position to allow the party to unite around Sloane.

== Candidates ==
=== Leadership ===
==== Nominated ====
Candidate	Electorate	Faction	Portfolio(s)
Kellie Sloane	Vaucluse	Moderate	Shadow Minister for Health

==== Withdrawn ====
Candidate	Electorate	Faction	Portfolio(s)
Alister Henskens	Wahroonga	Unaligned	Shadow Attorney-General; Manager of Opposition Business in the Legislative Assembly

== Endorsements ==
Kellie Sloane

State representatives

- Mark Speakman, outgoing leader and MP for Cronulla

== See also ==
- 2025 New South Wales National Party leadership election
- 2025 Liberal Party of Australia leadership election
- 2025 Victorian Liberal Party leadership spill
- 2025 Canberra Liberals leadership election
