= Liberal–National Coalition (New South Wales) =

Group of centre-right political parties in New South Wales

- Leader: Kellie Sloane
- Deputy Leader: Natalie Ward
- Founded: 1927
- Ideology: Conservatism; Liberalism; Liberal conservatism; Agrarianism
- Political position: Centre-right
- Colours: Blue
- Member parties: Liberal; National
- Legislative Assembly: 35 / 93
- Legislative Council: 14 / 42

The Liberal–National Coalition, commonly known simply as the Coalition, is an alliance of centre-right political parties that forms one of the two major groupings in New South Wales politics. The two partners in the Coalition are the New South Wales Liberal Party and the New South Wales National Party. Its main opponent is the New South Wales Labor Party (ALP); the two forces are often regarded as operating in a two-party system. The Coalition was last in government from 2011 to 2023. The group is led by Kellie Sloane, who succeeded Mark Speakman in a 2025 leadership spill.

== Details ==
The two parties in the Coalition have different geographical voter bases, with the Liberals – the larger party – drawing most of their vote from urban areas and the Nationals operating almost exclusively in rural and regional areas. They occupy a broadly similar place on the right of the political spectrum.

The partnership between the two current parties dates back to 1946, shortly after the Liberal Party was formed, and has continued almost uninterrupted since then. The Country Party also maintained similar alliances with the Liberal Party's predecessors, the Democratic Party, the United Australia Party and Nationalist Party.

The Liberals and Nationals maintain separate organisational wings and separate parliamentary parties, but co-operate in various ways determined by a mixture of formal agreements and informal conventions. There is a single Coalition frontbench, both in government and in opposition, with each party receiving a proportionate number of positions.

By convention, the leader of the Liberal Party serves as the overall leader, serving as Premier when the Coalition is in government and leader of the opposition when the Coalition is in opposition. The leader of the National Party becomes the deputy premier during periods of Coalition government. The two parties co-operate on their election campaigns, run joint Legislative Council tickets, and generally avoid running candidates against each other in the New South Wales Legislative Assembly.

A merger of the Liberals and Nationals has been suggested on a number of occasions, but has never become a serious proposition.

== History ==
A Coalition between the Liberal (and predecessors) and National parties has existed without interruption in New South Wales since 1927. Predecessors of the NSW Liberal Party, including the UAP, Nationalist Party and the Democratic Party, maintained a coalition with the Country Party (old name of National Party).

The Liberal Party is led by Kellie Sloane and the National Party by Gurmesh Singh. The Coalition won the 2011 state election in a massive swing under Barry O'Farrell, the 2015 election with a reduced majority under Mike Baird, and the 2019 election under Gladys Berejiklian. The Coalition led by Dominic Perrottet lost the 2023 state election and is in opposition since.

New South Wales is the only state where the non-Labor Coalition has never broken, and yet has also never merged. This remained the case even in 2011, when the Liberals won a majority in their own right but still retained the Coalition. On 10 September 2020, the Nationals threatened to move to the crossbench over a dispute regarding koala protection laws, but the issue was resolved the next day and the Nationals remained in the Coalition.

== Election results ==
Election	Seats won	±	Total votes	%	Position	Leader	Senior party	Junior party
1927	46 / 90	▲5		47.3%	Government	Thomas Bavin	Nationalist	Country
1930	35 / 90	▼11		40.06%	Opposition	Thomas Bavin	Nationalist	Country
1932	64 / 90	▲29		49.9%	Government	Bertram Stevens	UAP	Country
1935	61 / 90	▼3		46.02%	Government	Bertram Stevens	UAP	Country
1938	61 / 90	▼2		49.6%	Government	Bertram Stevens	UAP	Country
1941	26 / 90	▼33		31.3%	Opposition	Alexander Mair	UAP	Country
1944	22 / 90	▼4	371,560	29.32%	Opposition	Reginald Weaver	Democratic	Country
1947	34 / 90	▲12	647,753	40.75%	Opposition	Vernon Treatt	Liberal	Country
1950	46 / 94	▲12	749,001	46.48%	Opposition	Vernon Treatt	Liberal	Country
1953	36 / 94	▼10	612,419	39.54%	Opposition	Vernon Treatt	Liberal	Country
1956	42 / 94	▲6	783,362	46.25%	Opposition	Pat Morton	Liberal	Country
1959	44 / 94	▲2	603,718	44.06%	Opposition	Pat Morton	Liberal	Country
1962	39 / 94	▼5	852,356	44.22%	Opposition	Bob Askin	Liberal	Country
1965	47 / 94	▲8	1,016,694	49.82%	Minority Government	Bob Askin	Liberal	Country
1968	53 / 94	▲6	1,061,170	49.06%	Government	Bob Askin	Liberal	Country
1971	49 / 96	▼4	993,310	44.39%	Government	Bob Askin	Liberal	Country
1973	52 / 99	▲3	1,104,829	44.33%	Government	Bob Askin	Liberal	Country
1976	48 / 99	▼4	1,249,489	46.32%	Opposition	Eric Willis	Liberal	Country
1978	35 / 99	▼13	1,031,780	36.88%	Opposition	Peter Coleman	Liberal	National Country
1981	28 / 99	▼7	1,090,304	38.83%	Opposition	Bruce McDonald	Liberal	National Country
1984	37 / 99	▲9	1,292,996	43.00%	Opposition	Nick Greiner	Liberal	National
1988	59 / 109	▲22	1,588,095	49.54%	Government	Nick Greiner	Liberal	National
1991	49 / 99	▼10	1,377,314	44.68%	Minority Government	Nick Greiner	Liberal	National
1995	46 / 99	▼3	1,500,068	43.94%	Opposition	John Fahey	Liberal	National
1999	33 / 93	▼13	1,258,711	33.69%	Opposition	Kerry Chikarovski	Liberal	National
2003	32 / 93	▼1	1,312,892	34.35%	Opposition	John Brogden	Liberal	National
2007	35 / 93	▲3	1,457,296	36.99%	Opposition	Peter Debnam	Liberal	National
2011	69 / 93	▲34	2,124,321	51.15%	Government	Barry O'Farrell	Liberal	National
2015	54 / 93	▼15	2,009,821	45.63%	Government	Mike Baird	Liberal	National
2019	48 / 93	▼6	1,892,816	41.58%	Government	Gladys Berejiklian	Liberal	National
2023	36 / 93	▼12	1,663,215	35.37%	Opposition	Dominic Perrottet	Liberal	National
