= 2025 Liberal Party leadership election =

2025 Liberal Party leadership election may refer to:

- 2025 Liberal Party of Australia leadership election, a federal party vote
- 2025 Liberal Party of Canada leadership election, a federal party vote
- 2025 Liberal Party of Newfoundland and Labrador leadership election, a provincial party vote
- 2025 Quebec Liberal Party leadership election, a provincial party vote
- 2025 New South Wales Liberal Party leadership election, an Australian state political party vote
- 2025 Victorian Liberal Party leadership spill, an Australian state political party vote
- 2025 Canberra Liberals leadership election, an Australian territory political party vote
