= Kellie Sloane =

Australian politician and journalist (born 1973)

Kellie Sloane MP
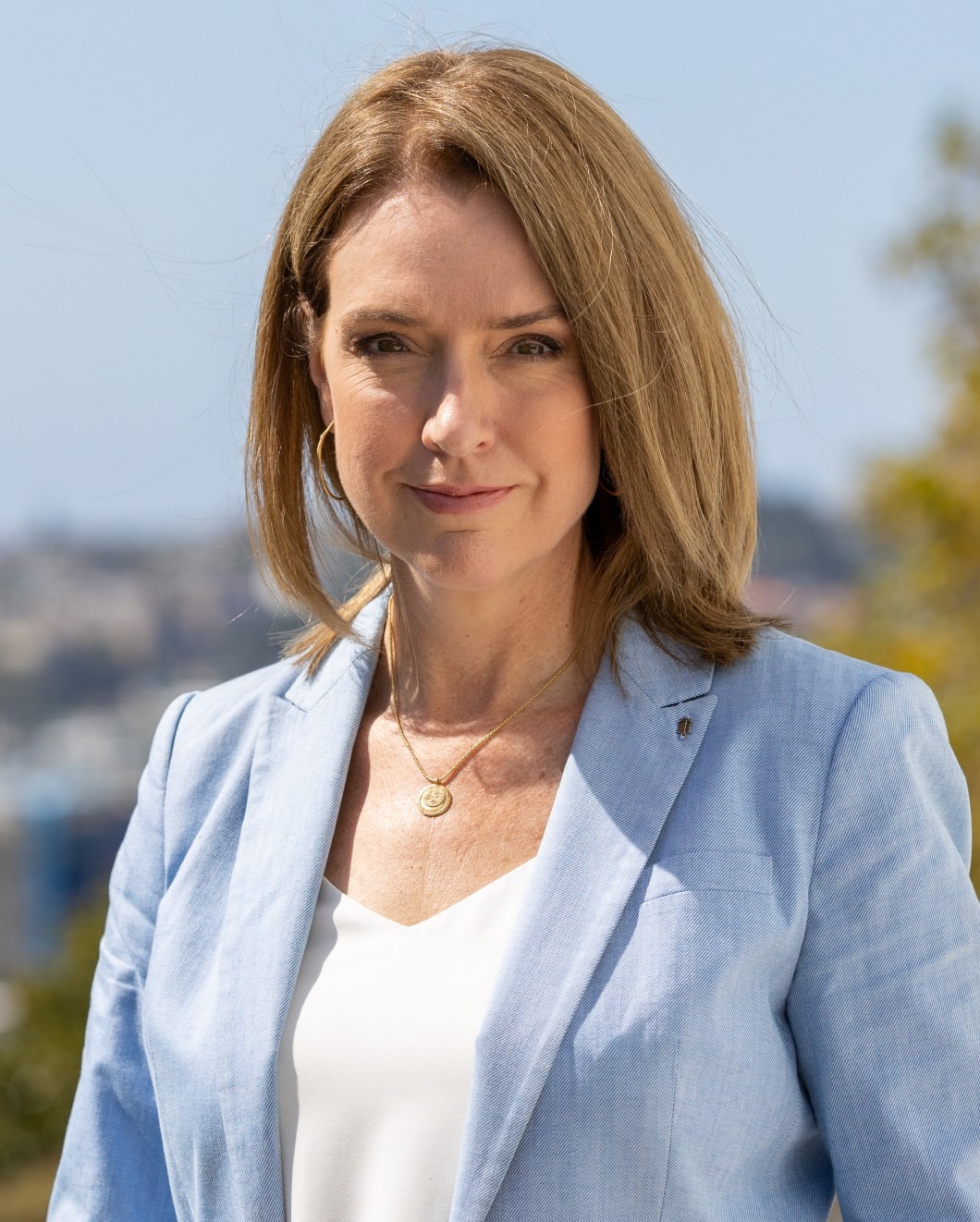
- Sloane in 2023

Leader of the Opposition in New South Wales
- Incumbent
- Assumed office 21 November 2025
- Premier: Chris Minns
- Deputy: Natalie Ward
- Preceded by: Mark Speakman

Leader of the New South Wales Liberal Party
- Incumbent
- Assumed office 21 November 2025
- Deputy: Natalie Ward
- Preceded by: Mark Speakman
Previous shadow ministerial positions
Shadow Minister for Health
In office 28 July 2024 – 6 January 2026
Leader	Mark Speakman; Herself
Preceded by	Matt Kean
Succeeded by	Sarah Mitchell
Shadow Minister for Environment
In office 9 May 2023 – 28 July 2024
Leader	Mark Speakman
Preceded by	Penny Sharpe
Succeeded by	James Griffin (as Shadow Minister for Energy, Climate Change and Environment)

Member of the New South Wales Parliament for Vaucluse
- Incumbent
- Assumed office 25 March 2023
- Preceded by: Gabrielle Upton

Personal details
- Born: Kellie Anne Sloane; January 1973 (age 53) Barossa Valley, South Australia
- Party: Liberal
- Spouse: Adam Connolly (m. 2003)
- Children: 3
- Education: University of South Australia
- Profession: Television journalist
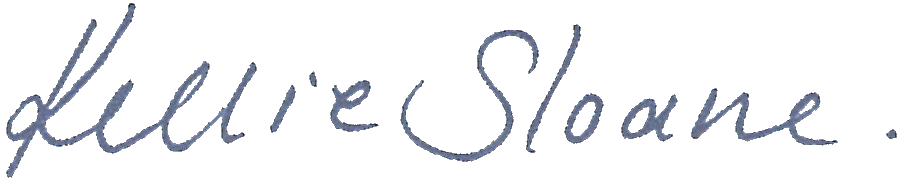
- Signature
- Website: kelliesloane.com.au

Kellie Anne Sloane (born January 1973) is an Australian politician who has served as leader of the opposition in New South Wales and leader of the New South Wales Liberal Party since 2025. She has been a member of the New South Wales Legislative Assembly for Vaucluse since 2023.

Sloane was a member of the shadow ministry of Mark Speakman, first serving as the shadow minister for the Environment until July 2024, before serving as the shadow minister for health. On 21 November 2025, she replaced Speakman as party leader unopposed and became leader of the opposition. Sloane is the third woman, after Kerry Chikarovski and Gladys Berejiklian, to lead the Liberals and the Coalition in New South Wales.

Before entering politics, Sloane was a charity CEO and television journalist. She was a presenter on the Nine Network's Nightline, and was also briefly an interim co-host of Today in 2007.

== Early life and education ==
Sloane grew up in the South Australian town of Tanunda, and also spent some time in Port Lincoln. She attended Nuriootpa High School, and completed a Bachelor of Arts at the University of South Australia in 1996. Her father, Bob Sloane, was mayor of Barossa Council from 2014 to 2018.

== Career ==
=== Media ===
Sloane started her career at the Australian Broadcasting Corporation (ABC).

Sloane joined the Nine Network in 1997 as a lifestyle series reporter for both A Current Affair and Money. She moved from A Current Affair in 2005, during a revamp of the programme to combat a ratings slump against rival Seven Network's Today Tonight.

In April 2007, Sloane moved to co-hosting Today with Karl Stefanovic, replacing Jessica Rowe, who was on maternity leave at the time. The replacement became permanent after Rowe announced that she was leaving the Nine Network a month later.

In October 2009, the Nine Network announced that Sloane would be shifted to the late night news programme Nightline, with Wendy Kingston moving to present Nine's Morning News Hour. She was also a fill in presenter for Nine News in Sydney. In July 2010, Sloane left the Nine Network after a 13 year tenure.

=== NGO work ===
In August 2015, Sloane was appointed CEO of Life Education NSW. She served in the position until 2019. In 2020, she was appointed CEO of Life Education Australia. She served in the position for two years.

== Political career ==
In October 2021, Sloane announced she was seeking preselection for the seat of Willoughby due to the resignation of Premier Gladys Berejiklian.

In November 2022, she was selected as the Liberal Party candidate for the electorate of Vaucluse at the 2023 New South Wales state election. She was comfortably elected. After election, she was appointed Shadow Minister for the Environment in the Shadow ministry of Mark Speakman. Upon the resignation of Matt Kean in 2024, Sloane was appointed Shadow Minister for Health.

=== 2025 leadership election ===
Sloane was seen as a likely successor to New South Wales Liberal Party leader Mark Speakman, who resigned from leadership on 20 November 2025. The Sydney Morning Herald reported that the two MPs met before his resignation, with Speakman supporting Sloane's move to take over the party. In a press conference on 20 November, Sloane confirmed she had nominated herself for the leadership position. On 21 November 2025, ABC News confirmed that Sloane was elected as leader unopposed after Alister Henskens withdrew from the race.

=== Leader of the Opposition ===
In January 2026, Sloane announced a cabinet reshuffle, removing factional opponents from her shadow ministry in preparation for the 2027 New South Wales state election. Monica Tudehope, representing the northern Sydney Epping electorate and daughter of New South Wales Legislative Council member Damien Tudehope was installed as Shadow Minister for Finance as well as Shadow Minister for Western Sydney, replacing Eleni Petinos. Adam Crouch, the Member for Terrigal on the Central Coast was dumped as Shadow Minister for the Central Coast and replaced by Sydney based Legislative Council member Jacqui Munro. Gurmesh Singh, nuclear power advocate, New South Wales National Party Leader and Member for Coffs Habour was made the Shadow Minister for the Small Business, Regional NSW and Trade portfolios.

== Views ==
=== Antisemitism ===
In response to the 2025 Bondi Beach shooting, Sloane publicly supported a royal commission into the incident, arguing that a national inquiry would have stronger powers to investigate security agency failures than the proposed state-based commission. Sloane wrote an opinion piece for The Daily Telegraph after the attack, saying that antisemitism had been "allowed to grow through complacency, institutional drift, and a failure of leadership over several years".

=== Development ===
In September 2023, Sloane opposed a plan to turn a derelict service station in Rose Bay into a Woolworths supermarket and apartment block, arguing that the development would be "an unprecedented extension of a corporate and commercial site into a residential area".

In June 2025, Sloane opposed a Rose Bay housing development plan proposed by Labor premier Chris Minns, arguing that the suburb was lacking critical services such as a major supermarket or transport links like a train line to support an increased population. Her position has been criticised by members of the Sydney YIMBY movement.

In September 2025, Sloane publicly opposed the completion of the Woollahra railway station along with rezoning that would allow higher density development to be built around the new station. Two months later, she stated she supported development of the railway station but criticised the plan, telling reporters that the area lacked community infrastructure.

In her first speech as party leader, Sloane said that she was "pro-housing" and called for the development of new metro lines, a policy championed by her predecessor Mark Speakman.

In August 2026, Sloane appeared with Woollahra Council mayor Sarah Dixson to oppose the Minns Government's 20 year "Sydney Plan", a strategic land development policy that would increase development in an area of the city with little extremely high density development.

== Personal life ==
Sloane is married to Adam Connolly, with whom she has three sons. Her husband was an advisor to Prime Minister John Howard. Sloane used her married name Connolly professionally from 2003, before reverting to her maiden name in 2013.

On 14 December 2025, Sloane was present during the aftermath of the Bondi Beach shooting, where terrorists targeted a Hanukkah celebration. Arriving shortly after the attack was stopped by police, she assisted lifeguards in giving first aid to victims.

New South Wales Legislative Assembly
Preceded by Gabrielle Upton	Member for Vaucluse; 2023–present	Incumbent
Political offices
Preceded by Mark Speakman	Leader of the Opposition in New South Wales; 2025–present	Incumbent
Party political offices
Preceded by Mark Speakman	Leader of the New South Wales Liberal Party; 2025–present	Incumbent
Media offices
Preceded by Wendy Kingston as Nine's Late News	Nightline; Presenter; November 2009 – July 2010	Program cancelled
Preceded by Wendy Kingston	Nine's Morning News Hour; Presenter; 2007–2009	Succeeded by Wendy Kingston
Preceded by Mike Munro	National Nine News Afternoon Edition; Presenter; 2006–2008	Succeeded by Leila McKinnon
Preceded by Georgie Gardner	Today; News presenter January 2007 – March 2007	Succeeded by Allison Langdon
Preceded by Sarah Murdoch	Today; Co-host with Karl Stefanovic; 1 April 2007 – 25 May 2007	Succeeded by Lisa Wilkinson
