= 2025 New South Wales National Party leadership election =

Australian state political party election

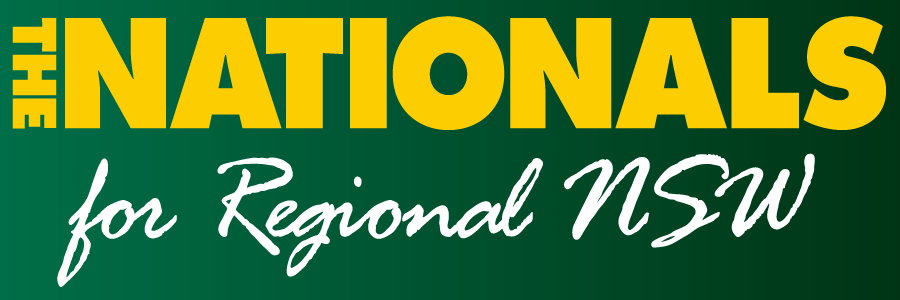
- 18 November 2025
- Leadership election
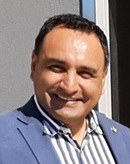
Candidate	Gurmesh Singh
Caucus vote	Unopposed
Seat	Coffs Harbour
Leader before election
Dugald Saunders
Elected Leader
Gurmesh Singh
- Deputy leadership election
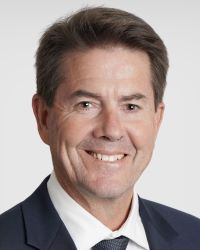
Candidate	Kevin Anderson
Caucus vote	Unopposed
Seat	Tamworth
Deputy leader before election
Gurmesh Singh
Elected Deputy leader
Kevin Anderson

A leadership election was held within the New South Wales National Party on 18 November 2025.

Gurmesh Singh was elected leader while Kevin Anderson was elected deputy leader.

Singh become the first person of Sikh descent to lead a major political party in Australia.

== Background ==
Dugald Saunders announced his resignation on 17 November 2025, necessitating this leadership election. He cited wanting to focus more on his family as a reason to resign.

== See also ==
- 2025 New South Wales Liberal Party leadership election
- 2025 Victorian Liberal Party leadership spill
- 2025 Canberra Liberals leadership election
- 2025 Liberal Party of Australia leadership election
- 2025 National Party of Australia leadership spill
