= Leader of the Opposition (New South Wales) =

Australian politician

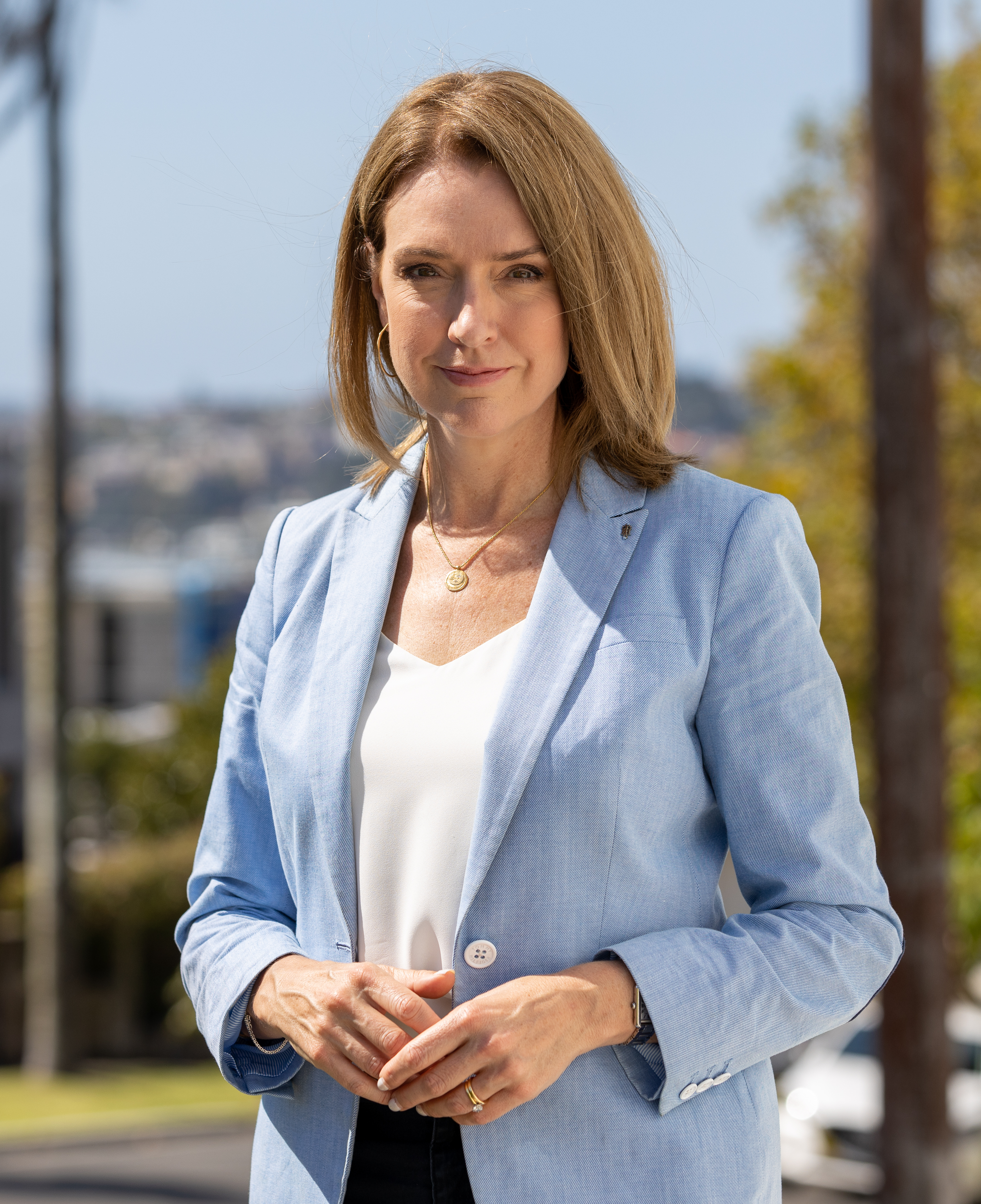
- Incumbent; Kellie Sloane since 21 November 2025
- Term length: While leader of the largest political party not in government
- Inaugural holder: Charles Lee
- Salary: A$309,621

The leader of the opposition is a title held by the leader of the second-largest party in the New South Wales Legislative Assembly, the lower house of the Parliament of New South Wales. There is also a leader of the opposition in the Legislative Council. The leader acts as the public face of the opposition, leading the opposition on the floor of parliament. They act as a chief critic of the government and ultimately attempt to portray the opposition as a feasible alternate government. They are also given certain additional rights under parliamentary standing orders, such as extended time limits for speeches.

== Leaders of the opposition in New South Wales since 1887 ==
Political parties

Labor Liberal Party of Australia Protectionist Free Trade Progressive Liberal Reform Party Labor (NSW) Nationalist Party of Australia
United Australia Party Democratic Party Country Party

=== Legislative Assembly ===
No.	Name	Portrait	Party	Constituency	Term of office		Tenure	Elections	Premier
	Joseph Palmer Abbott		Protectionist	Wentworth	9 March 1887	19 May 1887	71 days	–	Parkes; 1887–1889
	George Dibbs		Protectionist	Murrumbidgee	20 September 1887	16 January 1889	1 year, 118 days	–	Parkes; 1887–1889
	Sir Henry Parkes		Free Trade	St Leonards	17 January 1889	7 March 1889	49 days	1889	Dibbs; 1889
	George Dibbs		Protectionist	Murrumbidgee	8 March 1889	23 October 1891	2 years, 229 days	–	Parkes; 1889–1891
	George Reid		Free Trade	St Leonards	23 October 1891	2 August 1894	2 years, 283 days	1891; 1894	Dibbs; 1891–1894
	Sir George Dibbs		Protectionist	Murrumbidgee	3 August 1894	5 July 1895	336 days	1895	Reid; 1894–1899
	William Lyne		Protectionist	Hume	14 August 1895	6 October 1898	3 years, 53 days	1898	Reid; 1894–1899
	Edmund Barton		Protectionist	Hastings and Macleay	6 October 1898	23 August 1899	321 days	–	Reid; 1894–1899
	William Lyne		Protectionist	Hume	23 August 1899	13 September 1899	21 days	–	Reid; 1894–1899
	George Reid		Free Trade	Sydney-King	14 September 1899	23 March 1901	1 year, 190 days	–	Lyne; 1899–1901
1	Charles Lee		Liberal Reform	Tenterfield	23 March 1901	18 September 1902	1 year, 179 days	1901	See; 1901–1904
2	Joseph Carruthers		Liberal Reform	St George	18 September 1902	30 August 1904	1 year, 347 days	–	See; 1901–1904
2	Joseph Carruthers		Liberal Reform	St George	18 September 1902	30 August 1904	1 year, 347 days	1904	Waddell; 1904
3	James McGowen		Labor	Redfern	20 September 1904	21 October 1910	6 years, 31 days	1907	Carruthers; 1904–1907
3	James McGowen		Labor	Redfern	20 September 1904	21 October 1910	6 years, 31 days	1910	Wade; 1907–1910
4	Charles Wade		Liberal Reform	Gordon	21 October 1910	15 November 1916	6 years, 25 days	–	McGowen; 1910–1913
4	Charles Wade		Liberal Reform	Gordon	21 October 1910	15 November 1916	6 years, 25 days	1913	Holman; 1913–1920
5	Ernest Durack		Labor	Bathurst	22 November 1916	19 February 1917	89 days	–	Holman; 1913–1920
6	John Storey		Labor	Balmain	22 February 1917	13 April 1920	3 years, 51 days	1917	Holman; 1913–1920
6	John Storey		Labor	Balmain	22 February 1917	13 April 1920	3 years, 51 days	1920	Holman; 1913–1920
7	George Fuller		Nationalist	Wollondilly	14 April 1920	13 April 1922	1 year, 364 days	–	Storey; 1920–1921
7	George Fuller		Nationalist	Wollondilly	14 April 1920	13 April 1922	1 year, 364 days	1922	Dooley; 1921–1922
8	James Dooley		Labor	Bathurst	20 April 1922	9 March 1923	323 days	–	Fuller; 1922–1925
9	Greg McGirr		Labor	Sydney	9 March 1923	16 April 1923	38 days	–	Fuller; 1922–1925
10	Bill Dunn		Labor	Wammerawa	16 April 1923	31 July 1923	106 days	–	Fuller; 1922–1925
11	Jack Lang		Labor	Auburn	31 July 1923	17 June 1925	1 year, 321 days	1925	Fuller; 1922–1925
(7)	George Fuller		Nationalist	Wollondilly	23 June 1925	24 September 1925	93 days	–	Lang; 1925–1927
12	Thomas Bavin		Nationalist	Ryde	24 September 1925	18 October 1927	2 years, 24 days	1927	Lang; 1925–1927
(11)	Jack Lang		Labor	Auburn	18 October 1927	4 November 1930	3 years, 17 days	1930	Bavin; 1927–1930
(12)	Thomas Bavin		Nationalist	Gordon	25 November 1930	5 April 1932	1 year, 132 days	–	Lang; 1930–1932
(12)	Thomas Bavin		Nationalist	Gordon	25 November 1930	5 April 1932	1 year, 132 days	–	Lang; 1930–1932
(12)	Thomas Bavin		United Australia	Gordon	25 November 1930	5 April 1932	1 year, 132 days	–	Lang; 1930–1932
13	Bertram Stevens		United Australia	Croydon	5 April 1932	13 May 1932	38 days	1932	Lang; 1930–1932
(11)	Jack Lang		Labor (NSW)	Auburn	22 June 1932	5 September 1939	7 years, 75 days	1935	Stevens; 1932–1939
(11)	Jack Lang		Labor	Auburn	22 June 1932	5 September 1939	7 years, 75 days	1938	Stevens; 1932–1939
(11)	Jack Lang		Labor	Auburn	22 June 1932	5 September 1939	7 years, 75 days	–	Mair; 1939–1941
14	William McKell		Labor	Redfern	5 September 1939	16 May 1941	1 year, 253 days	1941	Mair; 1939–1941
15	Alexander Mair		United Australia	Albury	19 May 1941	10 February 1944	2 years, 267 days	–	McKell; 1941–1947
15	Alexander Mair		Democratic	Albury	19 May 1941	10 February 1944	2 years, 267 days	–	McKell; 1941–1947
16	Reginald Weaver		Democratic	Neutral Bay	10 February 1944	12 November 1945	1 year, 275 days	1944	McKell; 1941–1947
16	Reginald Weaver		Liberal	Neutral Bay	10 February 1944	12 November 1945	1 year, 275 days	–	McKell; 1941–1947
(15)	Alexander Mair		Liberal	Albury	13 November 1945	20 March 1946	127 days	–	McKell; 1941–1947
17	Vernon Treatt		Liberal	Woollahra	20 March 1946	10 August 1954	8 years, 143 days	–	McKell; 1941–1947
17	Vernon Treatt		Liberal	Woollahra	20 March 1946	10 August 1954	8 years, 143 days	1947	McGirr; 1947–1952
17	Vernon Treatt		Liberal	Woollahra	20 March 1946	10 August 1954	8 years, 143 days	1950	McGirr; 1947–1952
17	Vernon Treatt		Liberal	Woollahra	20 March 1946	10 August 1954	8 years, 143 days	1953	Cahill; 1952–1959
18	Murray Robson		Liberal	Vaucluse	17 August 1954	20 September 1955	1 year, 34 days	–	Cahill; 1952–1959
19	Pat Morton		Liberal	Mosman	20 September 1955	17 July 1959	3 years, 300 days	1956	Cahill; 1952–1959
19	Pat Morton		Liberal	Mosman	20 September 1955	17 July 1959	3 years, 300 days	1959	Cahill; 1952–1959
20	Robert Askin		Liberal	Collaroy	17 July 1959	13 May 1965	5 years, 300 days	–	Cahill; 1952–1959
20	Robert Askin		Liberal	Collaroy	17 July 1959	13 May 1965	5 years, 300 days	1962	Heffron; 1959–1964
20	Robert Askin		Liberal	Collaroy	17 July 1959	13 May 1965	5 years, 300 days	1965	Renshaw; 1964–1965
21	Jack Renshaw		Labor	Castlereagh	14 May 1965	23 July 1968	3 years, 70 days	1968	Askin; 1965–1975
22	Pat Hills		Labor	Phillip	30 July 1968	3 December 1973	5 years, 126 days	1971	Askin; 1965–1975
22	Pat Hills		Labor	Phillip	30 July 1968	3 December 1973	5 years, 126 days	1973	Askin; 1965–1975
23	Neville Wran		Labor	Bass Hill	3 December 1973	14 May 1976	2 years, 163 days	–	Askin; 1965–1975
23	Neville Wran		Labor	Bass Hill	3 December 1973	14 May 1976	2 years, 163 days	–	Lewis; 1975–1976
23	Neville Wran		Labor	Bass Hill	3 December 1973	14 May 1976	2 years, 163 days	1976	Willis; 1976
24	Eric Willis		Liberal	Earlwood	15 May 1976	16 December 1977	1 year, 215 days	–	Wran; 1976–1986
25	Peter Coleman		Liberal	Fuller	16 December 1977	7 October 1978	295 days	1978	Wran; 1976–1986
26	John Mason		Liberal	Dubbo	24 October 1978	29 May 1981	2 years, 217 days	–	Wran; 1976–1986
27	Bruce McDonald		Liberal	Kirribilli	1 June 1981	12 October 1981	133 days	1981	Wran; 1976–1986
28	John Dowd		Liberal	Lane Cove	27 October 1981	15 March 1983	1 year, 139 days	–	Wran; 1976–1986
29	Nick Greiner		Liberal	Ku-ring-gai	15 March 1983	25 March 1988	5 years, 10 days	1984	Wran; 1976–1986
29	Nick Greiner		Liberal	Ku-ring-gai	15 March 1983	25 March 1988	5 years, 10 days	1988	Unsworth; 1986–1988
30	Bob Carr		Labor	Maroubra	6 April 1988	4 April 1995	6 years, 363 days	1991	Greiner; 1988–1992
30	Bob Carr		Labor	Maroubra	6 April 1988	4 April 1995	6 years, 363 days	1995	Fahey; 1992–1995
31	Peter Collins		Liberal	Willoughby	4 April 1995	7 December 1998	3 years, 247 days	–	Carr; 1995–2005
32	Kerry Chikarovski		Liberal	Lane Cove	7 December 1998	28 March 2002	3 years, 111 days	1999	Carr; 1995–2005
33	John Brogden		Liberal	Pittwater	28 March 2002	1 September 2005	3 years, 157 days	2003	Carr; 1995–2005
33	John Brogden		Liberal	Pittwater	28 March 2002	1 September 2005	3 years, 157 days	–	Iemma; 2005–2008
34	Peter Debnam		Liberal	Vaucluse	1 September 2005	4 April 2007	1 year, 215 days	2007	Iemma; 2005–2008
35	Barry O'Farrell		Liberal	Ku-ring-gai	4 April 2007	28 March 2011	3 years, 358 days	–	Iemma; 2005–2008
35	Barry O'Farrell		Liberal	Ku-ring-gai	4 April 2007	28 March 2011	3 years, 358 days	–	Rees; 2008–2009
35	Barry O'Farrell		Liberal	Ku-ring-gai	4 April 2007	28 March 2011	3 years, 358 days	2011	Keneally; 2009–2011
36	John Robertson		Labor	Blacktown	31 March 2011	23 December 2014	3 years, 267 days	–	O'Farrell; 2011–2014
36	John Robertson		Labor	Blacktown	31 March 2011	23 December 2014	3 years, 267 days	–	Baird; 2014–2017
37	Luke Foley		Labor	Legislative Council; Auburn	5 January 2015	8 November 2018	3 years, 307 days	2015	Baird; 2014–2017
37	Luke Foley		Labor	Legislative Council; Auburn	5 January 2015	8 November 2018	3 years, 307 days	–	Berejiklian; 2017–2021
38	Michael Daley		Labor	Maroubra	10 November 2018	25 March 2019	135 days	2019	Berejiklian; 2017–2021
39	Jodi McKay		Labor	Strathfield	29 June 2019	28 May 2021	1 year, 333 days	–	Berejiklian; 2017–2021
40	Chris Minns		Labor	Kogarah	4 June 2021	28 March 2023	1 year, 297 days	2023	Berejiklian; 2017–2021
40	Chris Minns		Labor	Kogarah	4 June 2021	28 March 2023	1 year, 297 days	2023	Perrottet; 2021–2023
41	Mark Speakman		Liberal	Cronulla	21 April 2023	20 November 2025	2 years, 213 days	–	Minns; 2023–present
42	Kellie Sloane		Liberal	Vaucluse	21 November 2025	Incumbent	290 days	–	Minns; 2023–present
Source: Parliament of New South Wales

== Timeline (Since Statehood) ==
=== Legislative Council ===
No.	Name	Portrait	Party	Term of office		Tenure
1	Sir Henry Manning (Note: Manning refused the role of 'official' leader of the opposition, when offered to him, owing to his beliefs in a non-partisan Legislative Council. Nevertheless he was considered by his colleagues as the de facto leader of the opposition members.)		United Australia	16 May 1941	22 April 1958	16 years, 341 days
1	Sir Henry Manning		Democratic	16 May 1941	22 April 1958	16 years, 341 days
1	Sir Henry Manning		Liberal	16 May 1941	22 April 1958	16 years, 341 days
2	Hector Clayton		Liberal	12 April 1960	30 October 1962	2 years, 201 days
3	Arthur Bridges		Liberal	30 October 1962	13 May 1965	2 years, 195 days
4	Reg Downing		Labor	13 May 1965	4 February 1972	6 years, 267 days
5	Neville Wran		Labor	22 February 1972	19 October 1973	1 year, 239 days
6	Leroy Serisier		Labor	3 December 1973	13 May 1976	2 years, 162 days
7	Sir John Fuller		Country	14 May 1976	1 August 1978	2 years, 79 days
8	Max Willis		Liberal	1 August 1978	20 October 1981	3 years, 80 days
9	Lloyd Lange		Liberal	20 October 1981	3 April 1984	2 years, 166 days
10	Ted Pickering		Liberal	3 April 1984	24 March 1988	3 years, 356 days
11	Jack Hallam		Labor	6 April 1988	2 May 1991	3 years, 26 days
12	Michael Egan		Labor	2 July 1991	4 April 1995	3 years, 276 days
13	John Hannaford		Liberal	11 April 1995	31 March 1999	3 years, 354 days
14	Mike Gallacher		Liberal	31 March 1999	4 March 2011	11 years, 338 days
15	Tony Kelly		Labor	8 April 2011	6 June 2011	59 days
16	Luke Foley		Labor	14 June 2011	8 April 2015	3 years, 298 days
17	Adam Searle		Labor	8 April 2015	8 June 2021	6 years, 61 days
18	Penny Sharpe		Labor	8 June 2021	28 March 2023	1 year, 293 days
19	Damien Tudehope		Liberal	21 April 2023	incumbent	3 years, 139 days
Source: Parliament of New South Wales.

== Deputy leaders of the opposition ==
=== Legislative Assembly ===
The deputy leader of the opposition is a position in the New South Wales Parliament held by a second-largest political party or coalition member. The deputy leader of the opposition assists the leader of the opposition in their duties and may act as the leader of the opposition if the position becomes vacant. The position was established in New South Wales in 1986, with Peter Collins becoming the first person to hold it in its formalised capacity. Before this, the deputy leader of the opposition was largely informal, with no clear mandate or responsibilities.

No.	Name	Portrait	Party	Constituency	Term of office		Tenure
1	Peter Collins		Liberal	Willoughby; Middle Harbour	14 February 1986	2 February 1988	2 years, 8 days
2	Andrew Refshauge		Labor	Marrickville	11 April 1988	4 April 1995	6 years, 358 days
3	Ron Phillips		Liberal	Miranda	4 April 1995	27 March 1999	3 years, 357 days
4	Barry O'Farrell		Liberal	Ku-ring-gai	31 March 1999	28 March 2002	2 years, 362 days
5	Chris Hartcher		Liberal	Gosford	28 March 2002	3 April 2003	1 year, 6 days
(4)	Barry O'Farrell		Liberal	Ku-ring-gai	3 April 2003	4 April 2007	4 years, 1 day
6	Jillian Skinner		Liberal	North Shore	4 April 2007	28 March 2011	3 years, 359 days
7	Linda Burney		Labor	Canterbury	8 April 2011	7 March 2016	4 years, 334 days
8	Michael Daley		Labor	Maroubra	7 March 2016	10 November 2018	2 years, 248 days
9	Yasmin Catley		Labor	Swansea	2 July 2019	28 May 2021	1 year, 330 days
10	Prue Car		Labor	Londonderry	8 June 2021	28 March 2023	1 year, 293 days
11	Robyn Preston		Liberal	Hawkesbury	9 May 2023	21 November 2025	3 years, 121 days
12	Justin Clancy		Liberal	Albury	21 November 2025	Incumbent	290 days

=== Legislative Council ===
The deputy leader of the opposition in the Legislative Council plays an important role in assisting the leader of the opposition in managing and leading the opposition party's activities in the upper house of the Parliament of New South Wales. The position of deputy leader of the opposition in the Legislative Council dates back to at least 1966, when James Maloney was formally recognized as the first deputy leader of the opposition in the Legislative Council according to the Alphabetical Roll of Members from the Parliament of New South Wales. Maloney served in the position from 31st March 1966 to 26th April 1971. Several individuals have filled the position since then. The deputy leader of the opposition in the Legislative Council is specifically focused on supporting the opposition party's efforts, in contrast to the deputy leader of the government in the Legislative Council, who assists the leader of the government in the upper house. Despite not having a formally established date, the position of deputy leader of the opposition in the Legislative Council remains an important figure in NSW politics and an essential part of the opposition party's leadership team.

No.	Name	Portrait	Party	Term of office		Tenure
1	James Maloney		Labor	31 March 1966	26 April 1971	5 years, 26 days
2	Neville Wran		Labor	7 April 1971	21 February 1972	320 days
3	Edna Roper		Labor	3 December 1973	13 May 1976	2 years, 162 days
4	Frederick Hewitt		Liberal	14 May 1976	7 June 1976	24 days
5	Bob Rowland Smith		National	2 August 1978	24 March 1988	9 years, 235 days
6	Deirdre Grusovin		Labor	6 April 1988	31 May 1990	2 years, 55 days
7	Bryan Vaughan		Labor	1 June 1990	2 April 1995	4 years, 305 days
8	Richard Bull		National	11 April 1995	1 February 2000	4 years, 296 days
9	Duncan Gay		National	1 February 2000	4 March 2011	11 years, 31 days
10	Luke Foley		Labor	8 April 2011	14 June 2011	67 days
11	Adam Searle		Labor	14 June 2011	6 March 2015	3 years, 265 days
12	Walt Secord		Labor	5 May 2015	2 July 2019	4 years, 58 days
13	Penny Sharpe (Note: Also served as deputy leader of the opposition from 2018–2019 under Daley.)		Labor	2 July 2019	14 May 2021	1 year, 316 days
14	John Graham		Labor	8 June 2021	28 March 2023	1 year, 293 days
15	Natalie Ward (Note: Also served as deputy leader of the opposition from 8 May 2023 under Speakman.)		Liberal	21 April 2023	Incumbent	3 years, 139 days

== See also ==
- Leader of the New South Wales Liberal Party
- Leader of the Australian Labor Party in New South Wales
- Opposition (Australia)
