= 1984 New South Wales state election =

State election for New South Wales, Australia in March 1984

- 24 March 1984

All 99 seats in the New South Wales Legislative Assembly and 15 (of the 45) seats in the New South Wales Legislative Council 50 Assembly seats were needed for a majority
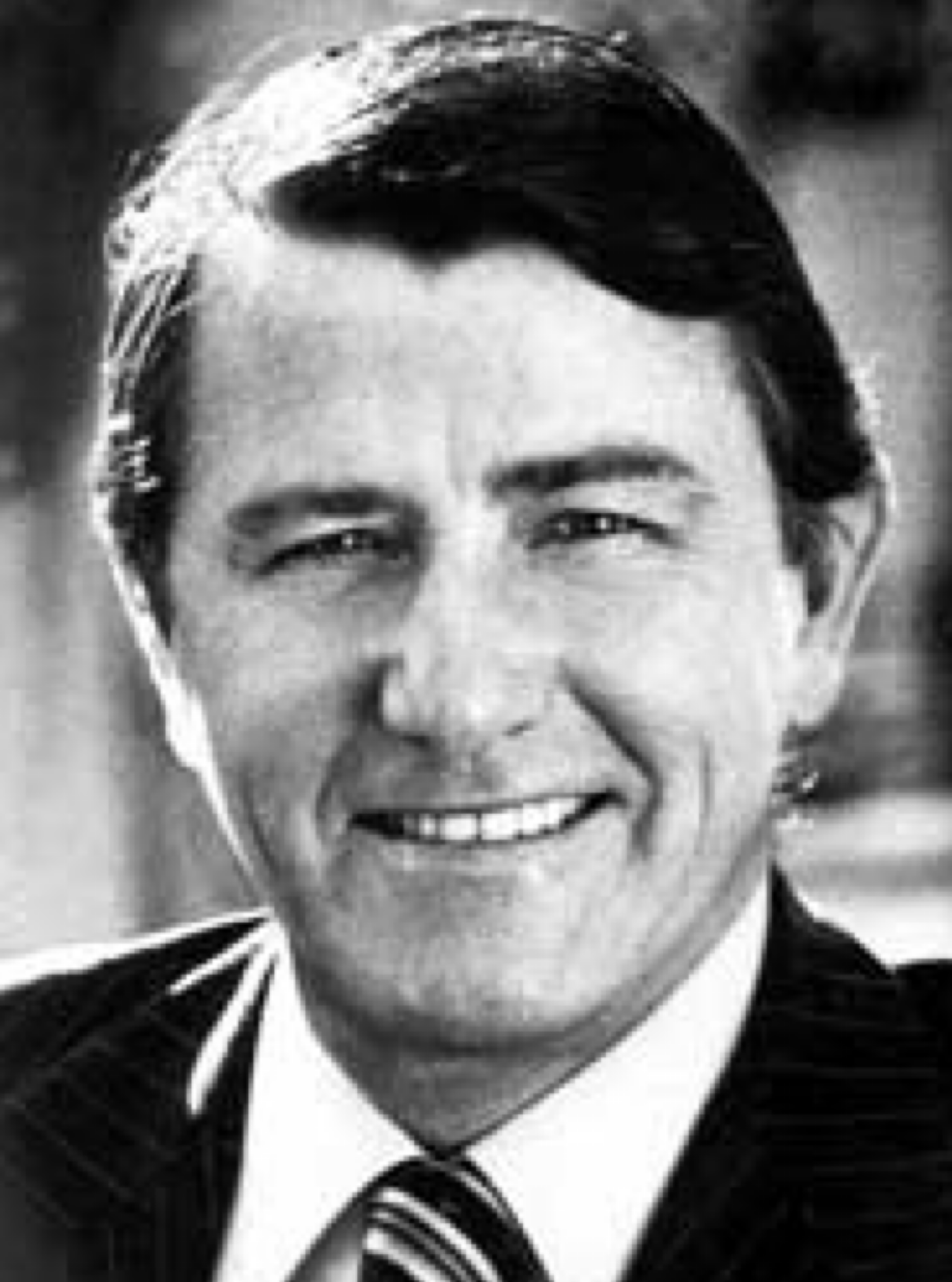

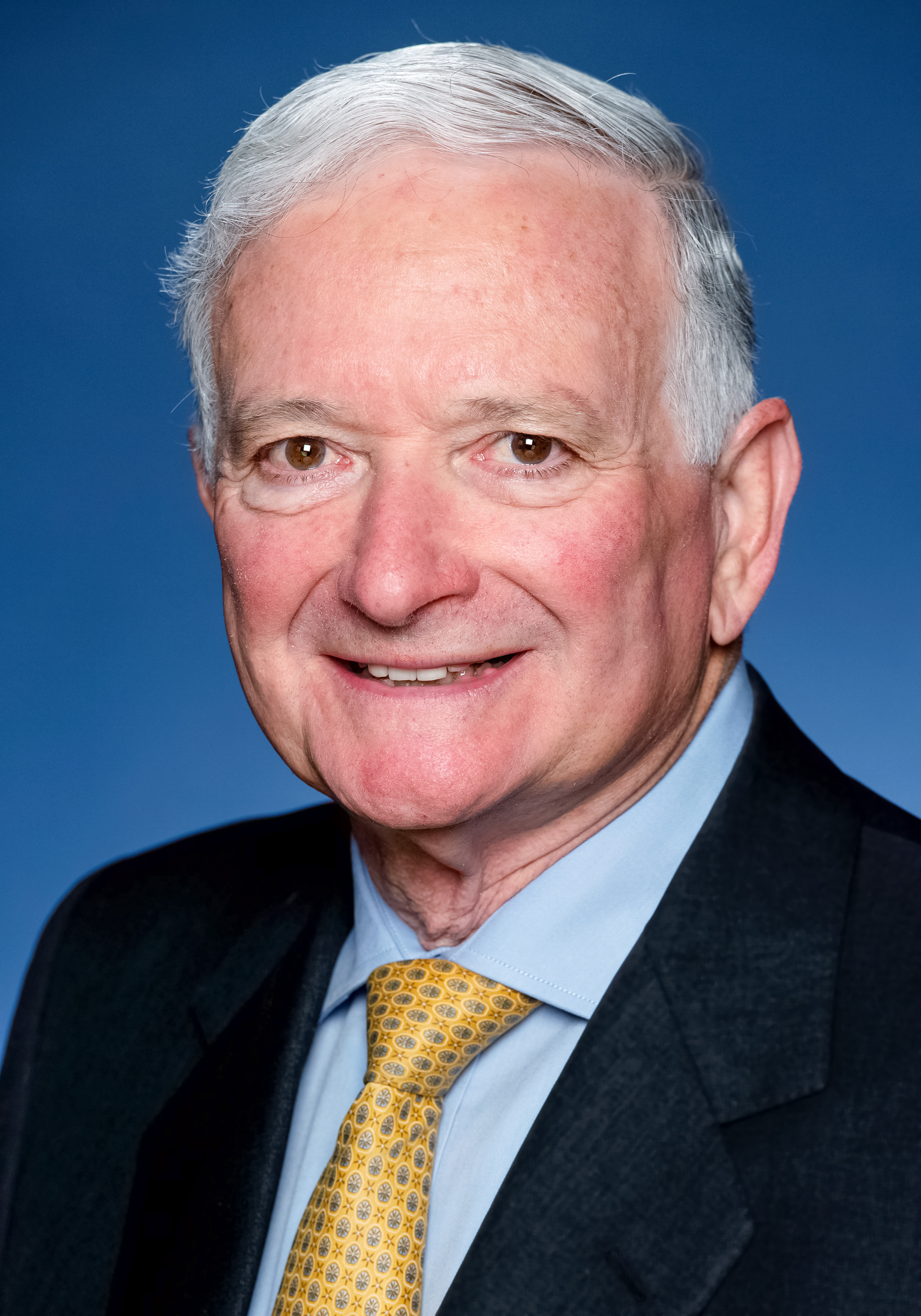
	First party	Second party
Leader	Neville Wran	Nick Greiner
Party	Labor	Liberal/National coalition
Leader since	3 December 1973	15 March 1983
Leader's seat	Bass Hill	Ku-ring-gai
Last election	69 seats	28 seats
Seats won	58	37
Seat change	▼11	▲9
Popular vote	1,466,413	1,292,996
Percentage	48.77%	43.00%
Swing	▼6.95	▲4.16
TPP	52.4%	47.6%
TPP swing	▼6.3	▲6.3
- Two-candidate-preferred margin by electorate
Premier before election
Neville Wran
Labor
Elected Premier
Neville Wran
Labor

Elections were held in the state of New South Wales, Australia, on Saturday 24 March 1984. The Labor government led by Neville Wran won a fourth term in office, though with a reduced (if still sizeable) majority and a 7% swing against it.

As the two previous elections each saw the sitting Opposition Leader lose the election and failing to be elected to Parliament, the 1984 election saw Nick Greiner becoming the first Opposition Leader to lose an election and retain his seat since Pat Hills in 1973.

Independents Ted Mack and John Hatton retained their seats of North Shore and South Coast respectively. They were joined on the cross benches by a third independent and Bruce Duncan.

Duncan, a former National Country Party member, withdrew from the party in protest at their change to the National Party name. He ran on an "Independent Country Party" ticket and won his seat of Lismore.

At a 1981 referendum, voters had approved an increase in the maximum parliamentary term from three years to four.

== Key dates ==
Date	Event
5 March 1984	The Legislative Assembly was dissolved, and writs were issued by the Governor to proceed with an election.
9 March 1984	Nominations for candidates for the election closed at noon.
24 March 1984	Polling day, between the hours of 8am and 6pm.
5 April 1984	The seventh Wran Ministry was reconstituted.
30 April 1984	The writ was returned and the results formally declared.
1 May 1984	Parliament resumed for business.

== Results ==
=== Legislative Assembly ===
New South Wales state election, 24 March 1984 Legislative Assembly << 1981–1988 >>
Enrolled voters	3,330,350				
Votes cast	3,081,226		Turnout	92.52	+1.37
Informal votes	74,316		Informal	2.41	–0.67
Summary of votes by party
Party	Primary votes	%	Swing	Seats	Change
Labor	1,466,413	48.77	–6.95	58	– 11
Liberal	1,026,901	34.15	+6.53	22	+ 8
National	266,095	8.85	–2.37	15	+ 1
Democrats	85,604	2.85	+0.42	0	± 0
Ind. Country	25,227	0.84	+0.84	1	+ 1
Call to Australia	2,347	0.08	+0.08	0	± 0
Socialist Labour	2,113	0.07	+0.07	0	± 0
Independent	130,013	4.32	+1.53	3	+ 1
Other (Note: One candidate each from the Citizens Action, Rainbow, Uninflated and National Action Parties.)	2,197	0.07	+0.07	0	± 0
Total	3,006,910			99	
Two-party-preferred
Labor		52.4%	-6.3%		
Liberal/National		47.6%	+6.3%		

Popular vote
Labor	48.77%
Liberal	34.15%
National	8.85%
Independents	4.32%
Democrats	2.85%
Others	1.06%
Two-party-preferred vote
Labor	52.4%
Coalition	47.6%
Parliamentary seats
Labor	58
Liberal	22
National	15
Independents	3
Ind. Country	1

=== Legislative Council ===
New South Wales state election, 24 March 1984 Legislative Council
Enrolled voters	3,330,350				
Votes cast	3,081,223		Turnout	92.52	+1.38
Informal votes	205,275		Informal	6.66	–0.18
Summary of votes by party
Party	Primary votes	%	Swing	Seats won	Seats held
Labor	1,348,348	46.88	–4.90	7	24
Liberal/National Coalition	1,225,519	42.61	+8.84	7	18
Call to Australia	175,068	6.09	–3.02	1	2
Democrats	90,634	3.15	–0.88	0	1
Concerned Citizens	14,036	0.49	+0.49	0	0
Progress	6,416	0.22	+0.11	0	0
Silent Majority	3,899	0.14	+0.14	0	0
Independent	12,028	0.42	+0.35	0	0
Total	2,875,948			15	

== Seats changing hands ==
Seat	Pre-1984			Swing	Post-1984		
Seat	Party	Member	Margin	Swing	Margin	Member	Party
Bligh	Labor	Fred Miller	2.7	-3.9	1.2	Michael Yabsley	Liberal
Burwood	Labor	Phil O'Neill	7.2	-8.8	1.6	Paul Zammit	Liberal
Camden	Labor	Ralph Brading	2.0	-7.2	5.2	John Fahey	Liberal
Clarence	Labor	Don Day	6.6	-10.9	4.3	Ian Causley	National
Cronulla	Labor	Michael Egan	5.3	-5.8	0.5	Malcolm Kerr	Liberal
Hurstville	Labor	Kevin Ryan	9.2	-10.1	0.9	Guy Yeomans	Liberal
Lismore	National	Bruce Duncan	18.9	N/A	26.9	Bruce Duncan	Independent Country
Manly	Labor	Alan Stewart	1.2	-5.7	4.5	David Hay	Liberal
Miranda	Labor	Bill Robb	4.3	-6.1	1.8	Ron Phillips	Liberal
Murrumbidgee	Labor	Lin Gordon	13.9	-15.4	1.5	Adrian Cruickshank	National
Wakehurst	Labor	Tom Webster	7.0	-8.2	1.2	John Booth	Liberal
Wollongong	Labor	Eric Ramsay	0.1	-4.3	4.2	Frank Arkell	Independent

- Members listed in italics did not recontest their seats.

== Post-election pendulum ==
Labor seats (58)
Marginal
Northern Tablelands	Bill McCarthy	ALP	1.6%
Albury	Harold Mair	ALP	1.9%
Gosford	Brian McGowan	ALP	1.9%
Woronora	Maurie Keane	ALP	3.3%
Blue Mountains	Bob Debus	ALP	3.5%
Waverley	Ernie Page	ALP	3.7%
Burrinjuck	Terry Sheahan	ALP	4.3%
Wentworthville	Ernie Quinn	ALP	4.6%
Ryde	Garry McIlwaine	ALP	4.9%
Georges River	Frank Walker	ALP	5.0%
Earlwood	Ken Gabb	ALP	5.2%
Bathurst	Mick Clough	ALP	5.3%
Parramatta	Barry Wilde	ALP	5.3%
Gladesville	Rodney Cavalier	ALP	5.5%
Monaro	John Akister	ALP	5.9%
Fairly safe
Kogarah	Brian Langton	ALP	6.3%
Coogee	Michael Cleary	ALP	6.8%
Campbelltown	Michael Knight	ALP	8.7% v IND
Kiama	Bill Knott	ALP	8.7%
Maitland	Allan Walsh	ALP	8.9%
Charlestown	Richard Face	ALP	9.0%
Drummoyne	John Murray	ALP	9.0%
Ashfield	Paul Whelan	ALP	9.9%
Safe
Seven Hills	Bob Christie	ALP	10.1%
Heathcote	Rex Jackson	ALP	11.1%
Lakemba	Wes Davoren	ALP	11.8%
Tuggerah	Harry Moore	ALP	11.8%
Lake Macquarie	Merv Hunter	ALP	12.2%
Ingleburn	Stan Knowles	ALP	13.0%
Maroubra	Bob Carr	ALP	13.2%
Peats	Paul Landa	ALP	13.2%
Waratah	John Price	ALP	13.2%
Penrith	Peter Anderson	ALP	14.3%
Wallsend	Ken Booth	ALP	14.3%
Newcastle	Arthur Wade	ALP	14.4%
Bankstown	Ric Mochalski	ALP	14.5%
Rockdale	Brian Bannon	ALP	14.6%
Riverstone	Richard Amery	ALP	14.9%
Cabramatta	Eric Bedford	ALP	15.1%
Heffron	Laurie Brereton	ALP	15.6%
East Hills	Pat Rogan	ALP	16.0%
Blacktown	John Aquilina	ALP	16.6%
Auburn	Peter Cox	ALP	16.8%
Bass Hill	Neville Wran	ALP	17.3%
Merrylands	Geoff Irwin	ALP	17.4%
Canterbury	Kevin Stewart	ALP	17.9%
Corrimal	Laurie Kelly	ALP	18.9%
Granville	Laurie Ferguson	ALP	18.9%
Balmain	Peter Crawford	ALP	19.0%
St Marys	Ron Mulock	ALP	19.0%
Illawarra	George Petersen	ALP	19.6%
Broken Hill	Bill Beckroge	ALP	20.1%
Fairfield	Janice Crosio	ALP	21.8%
Elizabeth	Pat Hills	ALP	22.2%
Liverpool	George Paciullo	ALP	22.2%
Swansea	Don Bowman	ALP	22.2%
Marrickville	Andrew Refshauge	ALP	23.4%
Cessnock	Stan Neilly	ALP	26.2%

Liberal/National seats (37)
Marginal
Cronulla	Malcolm Kerr	LIB	0.5%
Byron	Don Beck	NAT	0.8%
Hurstville	Guy Yeomans	LIB	0.9%
Bligh	Michael Yabsley	LIB	1.2%
Wakehurst	John Booth	LIB	1.2%
Murrumbidgee	Adrian Cruickshank	NAT	1.5%
Burwood	Paul Zammit	LIB	1.6%
Miranda	Ron Phillips	LIB	1.8%
Goulburn	Robert Webster	NAT	2.3%
Clarence	Ian Causley	NAT	4.3%
Manly	David Hay	LIB	4.5%
Fairly safe
Camden	John Fahey	LIB	7.2%
Castlereagh	Roger Wotton	NAT	7.3%
Orange	Garry West	NAT	8.0%
Hornsby	Neil Pickard	LIB	9.2%
Upper Hunter	Col Fisher	NAT	9.5%
Safe
Coffs Harbour	Matt Singleton	NAT	11.3%
Gloucester	Leon Punch	NAT	11.9%
Oxley	Bruce Jeffery	NAT	12.7%
Barwon	Wal Murray	NAT	13.0%
Tamworth	Noel Park	NAT	13.4%
Wagga Wagga	Joe Schipp	LIB	14.0%
Eastwood	Jim Clough	LIB	14.8%
Dubbo	Gerry Peacocke	NAT	14.9%
Willoughby	Peter Collins	LIB	15.4%
Davidson	Terry Metherell	LIB	15.5%
Pittwater	Max Smith	LIB	15.5%
Lachlan	Ian Armstrong	NAT	15.9%
Hawkesbury	Kevin Rozzoli	LIB	18.0%
The Hills	Fred Caterson	LIB	18.9%
Lane Cove	John Dowd	LIB	19.2%
Mosman	Phillip Smiles	LIB	19.5%
Northcott	Bruce Baird	LIB	20.0%
Murray	Tim Fischer	NAT	22.6%
Vaucluse	Rosemary Foot	LIB	24.6%
Gordon	Tim Moore	LIB	30.3%
Ku-ring-gai	Nick Greiner	LIB	30.9%
Crossbench seats (4)
Wollongong	Frank Arkell	IND	4.2% v ALP
North Shore	Ted Mack	IND	7.7% v LIB
South Coast	John Hatton	IND	26.0% v ALP
Lismore	Bruce Duncan	IND	26.9% v ALP

== See also ==
- Candidates of the 1984 New South Wales state election
