= Malcolm Kerr (politician) =

Australian politician (born 1950)

Malcolm John Kerr JP (born 18 April 1950), a former Australian politician, was a Member of the New South Wales Legislative Assembly representing Cronulla for the Liberal Party between 1984 and 2011. Kerr is a barrister.

New South Wales Legislative Assembly
Preceded by Michael Egan	Member for Cronulla; 1984–2011	Succeeded by Mark Speakman
