= Michael Egan (Australian politician) =

Australian politician (1948–2024)

The Honourable Michael Egan AO

Chancellor of Macquarie University
- In office February 2008 – February 2019
- Preceded by: Maurice Newman
- Succeeded by: Martin Parkinson

Treasurer of New South Wales
- In office 3 April 1995 – 21 January 2005
- Premier: Bob Carr
- Preceded by: Peter Collins
- Succeeded by: Andrew Refshauge

Leader of the Government in the Legislative Council
- In office 3 April 1995 – 21 January 2005
- Premier: Bob Carr
- Preceded by: John Hannaford
- Succeeded by: John Della Bosca

Vice-President of the Executive Council
- In office 3 April 1995 – 21 January 2005
- Premier: Bob Carr
- Preceded by: John Hannaford
- Succeeded by: John Della Bosca

Member of the New South Wales Legislative Council
- In office 24 September 1986 – 8 February 2005
- Preceded by: Barrie Unsworth
- Succeeded by: Greg Donnelly

Member of the New South Wales Legislative Assembly for Cronulla
- In office 7 October 1978 – 5 March 1984
- Preceded by: Ian Griffith
- Succeeded by: Malcolm Kerr

Personal details
- Born: Michael Rueben Egan; 21 February 1948 Sydney, New South Wales, Australia
- Died: 31 January 2024 (aged 75)
- Party: Labor Party
- Education: University of Sydney

Michael Rueben Egan AO (21 February 1948 – 31 January 2024) was an Australian union official and politician, who served as Treasurer of New South Wales between 1995 and 2005. Egan served as the Chancellor of Macquarie University from 2008 until 2019 and sat on a number of government and non-government advisory boards.

== Early years and background ==
Born in Sydney, Egan was educated at St Patrick's Catholic College, Sutherland and obtained his Bachelor of Arts from The University of Sydney. He worked in the Australasian Meat Industry Employees Union as a Federal Research Officer (1969–1973) and was an Advisor to Les Johnson as Federal Minister for Housing and Construction and Federal Minister for Aboriginal Affairs (1973–1975).

Egan served as an Officer of the NSW State Pollution Control Commission (1976–1978). Subsequently, he was employed as a Senior Policy Advisor to Barrie Unsworth, initially when the latter was Minister for Transport and Minister for Health, and then when Unsworth was Premier of NSW (1984–1986).

Egan died on 31 January 2024, at the age of 75.

== Political career ==
Egan was elected to the New South Wales Legislative Assembly on 7 October 1978, representing the seat of Cronulla. Although re-elected on 19 August 1981, he was defeated in the election held on 5 March 1984. He successfully ran for election to the New South Wales Legislative Council on 24 September 1986. It was not until the Bob Carr-led Labor Party took power on 3 April 1995 that he became State Treasurer, Minister for Energy, and Minister for State Development. In a Ministerial reshuffle in November 1997, Bob Debus took over the Energy portfolio. Egan was also Minister for Gaming and Racing for one month during 2003 replacing Richard Face and succeeded by Grant McBride. Egan was eventually to become the longest serving Treasurer in New South Wales.

In the few years before he became Treasurer when Labor was in Opposition, Egan had been the Shadow Finance Minister. Even though then Opposition Leader Bob Carr was Shadow Treasurer, Egan became the informal Opposition counterpart to Liberal Treasurer Peter Collins when Collins was appointed Treasurer in 1993. It was Egan, not Carr, who debated Collins on economic matters in media appearances. Egan in effect, if not in name, acted as the real Shadow Treasurer. It was because of Egan's solid performance against Treasurer Collins that Carr, upon becoming Premier in 1995 with the ALP's victory at the State election, broke with convention in not appointing the Shadow Treasurer just prior to the election (which was Carr himself) as Treasurer and appointed Egan instead.

Another break in convention with Egan's appointment as Treasurer is that he was a member of the Upper House, the New South Wales Legislative Council as previous Treasurers had been from the Lower House, the Legislative Assembly. However, since all money bills had to be introduced first in the Lower House, the Legislative Assembly, Egan delivered the State Budgets of 1995 to 2004 in the Legislative Assembly despite not being a member of that house of Parliament.

Announcing his resignation on 18 January 2005, Egan stated that, "after 35 years of political combat, I think it's time for me to move on."

He retired just months short of what would have been his tenth anniversary as Treasurer.

== Career after politics ==
Appointed a member of the Council of Macquarie University in 2006, Egan was appointed Chancellor in February 2008 and held this position until February 2019. Other community roles include Chairman of the Australia Day Council of New South Wales since 2006, Chairman of the Centenary Institute of Cancer Medicine and Cell Biology since 2005, a Governor of the Woolcock Institute of Medical Research since 2005, and a Director of the Maritime Services Board of New South Wales between 1984 and 1986.

In May 2008 Egan was appointed Chairman of Terria, and in 2009, he was appointed the Chair of the Australian Fisheries Management Authority Commission.

During the 2015 New South Wales state election Egan supported the privatisation stance of the Liberal government and slammed the Labor Party on its anti privatisation position.

New South Wales Legislative Assembly
Preceded by Ian Griffith	Member for Cronulla; 1978–1984	Succeeded by Malcolm Kerr
Preceded by Barrie Unsworth	Member of the New South Wales Legislative Council; 1986–2005	Succeeded by Greg Donnelly
Political offices
Preceded by Jack Hallam	Leader of the Opposition in the Legislative Council; 1991–1995	Succeeded by John Hannaford
Preceded by John Hannaford	Leader of the Government in the Legislative Council; 1995–2005	Succeeded by John Della Bosca
Preceded by John Hannaford	Vice-President of the Executive Council; 1995–2005	Succeeded by John Della Bosca
Preceded by Peter Collins	Treasurer of New South Wales; 1995–2005	Succeeded by Andrew Refshauge
Preceded by Ted Pickering	Minister for Energy; 1995–1997	Succeeded by Bob Debus
Preceded by John Fahey as Minister for Economic Development	Minister for State Development; 1995	Succeeded by Himself
Preceded by Carl Scully as Minister for Small Business and Regional Development	Minister for State and Regional Development; 1995–1997	Succeeded by Himself as Minister for State Development
Preceded by Himself as Minister for State Development	Minister for State and Regional Development; 1995–1997	Succeeded by Harry Woods as Minister for Regional Development
Preceded by Himself	Minister for State Development; 1997–2005	Succeeded by Andrew Refshauge
Preceded by Richard Face	Minister for Gaming and Racing; 2003–2005	Succeeded by Grant McBride
Party political offices
Preceded by Jack Hallam	Leader of the Labor Party in the Legislative Council; 1991–2005	Succeeded by John Della Bosca
Academic offices
Preceded by Maurice Newman	Chancellor of Macquarie University; 2008–2019	Succeeded by Martin Parkinson
