= Dugald Saunders =

Australian politician

Dugald Saunders MP

Leader of the New South Wales National Party
- In office 8 May 2023 – 17 November 2025
- Deputy: Bronnie Taylor; Gurmesh Singh
- Preceded by: Paul Toole
- Succeeded by: Gurmesh Singh

Minister for Agriculture and Western New South Wales
- In office 21 December 2021 – 28 March 2023
- Premier: Dominic Perrottet
- Preceded by: Adam Marshall
- Succeeded by: John Graham (interim)

Member of the New South Wales Parliament for Dubbo
- Incumbent
- Assumed office 23 March 2019
- Preceded by: Troy Grant

Personal details
- Party: National
- Occupation: Journalist

Dugald William Saunders is an Australian politician who served as leader of the New South Wales National Party from 2023 to 2025. He has been a member of the New South Wales Legislative Assembly for Dubbo since 2019. Saunders was the Minister for Agriculture and the Minister for Western New South Wales in the Perrottet ministry from 2021 to 2023.

Before entering politics, Saunders had a long career in broadcasting. He was a commentator at the 2000 Sydney Olympic Games and was the ABC Local Radio morning presenter in Dubbo for ten years.

Following a leadership spill in May 2023, Saunders became leader of the New South Wales National Party.

In November 2025, Saunders announced his resignation as the leader of the New South Wales National Party. The day before he resigned, it emerged that his 19-year-old daughter was a pornographic actress. On 18 November, Gurmesh Singh was elected as Saunders' replacement.

New South Wales Legislative Assembly
Preceded by Troy Grant	Member for Dubbo; 2019–present	Incumbent
Political offices
Preceded by Adam Marshall as Minister for Agriculture and Western New South Wales	Minister for Agriculture; 2021–2023	Succeeded by John Graham (interim)
Preceded by Adam Marshall as Minister for Agriculture and Western New South Wales	Minister for Western New South Wales; 2021–2023	Succeeded by John Graham (interim)
