= Electoral district of Cronulla =

Cronulla New South Wales—Legislative Assembly
- Interactive map of district boundaries from the 2023 state election
- State: New South Wales
- Dates current: 1959–present
- MP: Mark Speakman
- Party: Liberal Party
- Namesake: Cronulla
- Electors: 58,926 (2023)
- Area: 65 km^{2} (25.1 sq mi)
- Demographic: Outer-metropolitan
Electorates around Cronulla:
Rockdale	Heffron	Maroubra
Miranda	Cronulla	Pacific Ocean
Heathcote	Heathcote	Pacific Ocean

Cronulla is an electoral district of the Legislative Assembly in the Australian state of New South Wales. It is represented by Mark Speakman of the Liberal Party.

== Members for Cronulla ==
Member	Party	Period
Ian Griffith	Liberal	1959–1978
Michael Egan	Labor	1978–1984
Malcolm Kerr	Liberal	1984–2011
Mark Speakman	Liberal	2011–present

== Election results ==
2023 New South Wales state election: Cronulla
Party	Candidate	Votes	%	±%
Liberal	Mark Speakman	28,505	54.18	−9.34
Labor	Paul Constance	14,468	27.50	+4.30
Greens	Catherine Dyson	4,585	8.71	+1.30
One Nation	Craig Ibbotson	3,197	6.08	+6.08
Sustainable Australia	Richard Moran	1,012	1.92	−0.55
Informed Medical Options	Domna Giannakis	845	1.61	+1.61
Total formal votes		52,612	97.68	+0.20
Informal votes		1,251	2.32	−0.20
Turnout		53,863	91.41	−0.19
Two-party-preferred result
Liberal	Mark Speakman	30,407	63.79	−5.82
Labor	Paul Constance	17,263	36.21	+5.82
Liberal hold		Swing	−5.82	
