= Mark Speakman =

Australian politician from New South Wales (born 1959)

The Honourable Mark Speakman SC MP
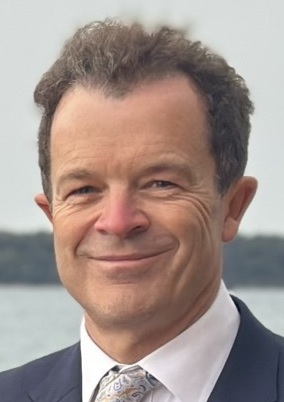
- Speakman in 2023

Leader of the Opposition in New South Wales
- In office 21 April 2023 – 20 November 2025
- Premier: Chris Minns
- Deputy: Natalie Ward
- Preceded by: Chris Minns
- Succeeded by: Kellie Sloane

Leader of the New South Wales Liberal Party
- In office 21 April 2023 – 20 November 2025
- Deputy: Natalie Ward
- Preceded by: Dominic Perrottet
- Succeeded by: Kellie Sloane
Cabinet positions
Attorney General of New South Wales
In office 30 January 2017 – 28 March 2023
Premier	Gladys Berejiklian; Dominic Perrottet
Preceded by	Gabrielle Upton
Succeeded by	Michael Daley
Leader of the House
In office 8 May 2020 – 21 December 2022
Premier	Gladys Berejiklian; Dominic Perrottet
Preceded by	Andrew Constance
Succeeded by	Alister Henskens
Minister for the Prevention of Domestic Violence
In office 2 April 2019 – 21 December 2021
Premier	Gladys Berejiklian; Dominic Perrottet
Preceded by	Pru Goward
Succeeded by	Natalie Ward
Minister for the Environment
In office 2 April 2015 – 30 January 2017
Premier	Mike Baird
Preceded by	Rob Stokes
Succeeded by	Gabrielle Upton
Minister for Heritage
In office 2 April 2015 – 30 January 2017
Premier	Mike Baird
Preceded by	Rob Stokes
Succeeded by	Gabrielle Upton
Assistant Minister for Planning
In office 2 April 2015 – 30 January 2017
Premier	Mike Baird
Preceded by	Rob Stokes
Succeeded by	Position abolished

Member of the New South Wales Parliament for Cronulla
- Incumbent
- Assumed office 26 March 2011
- Preceded by: Malcolm Kerr

Personal details
- Born: 6 November 1959 (age 67) Sydney, New South Wales, Australia
- Party: Liberal
- Other political affiliations: Conservative (UK) (Note: During his time at the University of Cambridge, Speakman became a member of the Cambridge University Conservative Association (CUCA).)
- Education: Caringbah North Public School; Caringbah High School
- Alma mater: University of Sydney; University of Cambridge
- Profession: Barrister

Mark Raymond Speakman (born 6 November 1959) is an Australian politician who served as the leader of the opposition in New South Wales and the leader of the New South Wales Liberal Party from 2023 until his resignation from both positions in 2025. He has been a member of the New South Wales Legislative Assembly for Cronulla since 2011.

Between April 2015 and January 2017, he was the Minister for the Environment, the Minister for Heritage, and the Assistant Minister for Planning in the second Baird government, and the Minister for Prevention of Domestic and Sexual Violence in the Berejiklian and Perrottet ministries.

He was the Attorney General from January 2017 until the defeat of the Liberal–National coalition at the 2023 election. He was a member of the second Berejiklian ministry from 2019 to 2023, and the first line-up of the Perrottet ministry.

== Early life and background ==
Speakman attended government schools in Caringbah, including Caringbah High School, before studying law and economics at the University of Sydney and then the University of Cambridge, from which he graduated with a master's degree. A practising lawyer, he was called to the bar in 1991, and was made senior counsel in 2004.

== Political career ==
Speakman was a member of the Cronulla branch of the Young Liberals. During his time in the United Kingdom, he paid £6 to become a life member of the Cambridge University Conservative Association.

Preselected in November 2010, following the announcement that the sitting member, Malcolm Kerr, would retire, Speakman overcame a challenge from Stephen Mutch, a former member for the federal seat of Cook and former state member of the Legislative Council. Speakman had challenged Mutch for the Cook preselection prior to the 1998 federal election, but withdrew from the contest when former state deputy Liberal leader, Bruce Baird, became the compromise candidate.

At the 2011 state election, Speakman was elected with a swing of 9.4 points and won the seat with 75.5 per cent of the vote on a two-party-preferred basis. Speakman's main opponent was Stefanie Jones, representing Labor. Premier Barry O'Farrell considered elevating Speakman to the ministry following the election, but he was not made a minister until April 2015 when, following the 2015 state election, he was appointed as Minister for the Environment, the Minister for Heritage, and the Assistant Minister for Planning in the second Baird ministry.

Following the resignation of Mike Baird as Premier, Gladys Berejiklian was elected as Liberal leader and sworn in as Premier. The First Berejiklian ministry was subsequently formed with Speakman sworn in as the Attorney General of NSW with effect from 30 January 2017. Following the 2019 state election Speakman was appointed as the Minister for the Prevention of Domestic Violence in addition to his responsibilities as Attorney General in the second Berejiklian ministry with effect from 2 April 2019; a title subsequently amended as the Minister for the Prevention of Domestic Violence and Sexual Assault in May 2021. In the second arrangement of the Perrottet ministry, he retained the portfolio title of Attorney General.

In September 2018, Speakman reportedly broke Victor Dominello's arm in an office arm wrestling match.

In April 2023, after the Liberal Party’s defeat in the 2023 New South Wales state election, he was elected as Leader of the Liberal Party and hence Leader of the Opposition. On 9 June 2023, Speakman was granted retention of The Honourable title by the Governor for life, for having served as a Member of the Executive Council for more than three years.

On 20 November 2025, following rifts in leadership and slipping poll performance, Speakman resigned as leader of the NSW Liberal Party. He endorsed Kellie Sloane, current Shadow Health Minister and MP for Vaucluse, to succeed him.

== Political views ==
In September 2023, Speakman told the Daily Telegraph that he advocated for "significant population growth", warning that without it Australia was at risk of invasion and being unable to "securely maintain occupation" of the country. His comments were in contrast to calls for reduced immigration from the federal Liberal Party and attracted criticism, resulting in Speakman attempting to backtrack.

Despite some initial concerns, Speakman supported the Indigenous Voice to Parliament, but at the same time stated that he would not campaign for it. He supports the use of quotas to increase female representation in the Liberal Party room.

Speakman voted against decriminalising abortion in NSW. However, he voted for amendments that were intended to increase access to abortion services in 2025.

== Personal life ==
Speakman has a pet dog named Lucy, a rescue dog who has her own Instagram account.

== See also ==
- Speakman shadow ministry

New South Wales Legislative Assembly
Preceded by Malcolm Kerr	Member for Cronulla; 2011–present	Incumbent
Political offices
Preceded by Gabrielle Upton	Attorney General; 2017–2023	Succeeded by Michael Daley
Preceded by Pru Goward as Minister for Prevention of Domestic Violence and Sexual Assault	Minister for the Prevention of Domestic Violence; Minister for Prevention of Domestic and Sexual Violence; 2019–2021	Succeeded by Natalie Ward as Minister for Minister for Women's Safety and the Prevention of Domestic and Sexual Violence
Preceded by Rob Stokes	Minister for the Environment; 2015–2017	Succeeded by Gabrielle Upton
Preceded by Rob Stokes	Minister for Heritage; 2015–2017	Succeeded by Gabrielle Upton
Preceded by Rob Stokes	Assistant Minister for Planning; 2015–2017	Portfolio abolished
Preceded by Chris Minns	Leader of the Opposition in New South Wales; 2023–2025	Succeeded by Kellie Sloane
Party political offices
Preceded by Dominic Perrottet	Leader of the New South Wales Liberal Party; 2023–2025	Succeeded by Kellie Sloane
