= Gurmesh Singh =

Australian politician

Gurmesh Singh MP
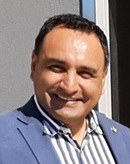
- Singh in 2022

Member of the New South Wales Parliament for Coffs Harbour
- Incumbent
- Assumed office 23 March 2019

Leader of the New South Wales National Party
- Incumbent
- Assumed office 18 November 2025
- Deputy: Kevin Anderson
- Preceded by: Dugald Saunders

Deputy Leader of the New South Wales National Party
- In office 20 June 2024 – 18 November 2025
- Preceded by: Bronnie Taylor
- Succeeded by: Kevin Anderson

Personal details
- Born: 25 April
- Party: National Party of Australia

Gurmesh Singh is an Australian politician. He has been a member of the New South Wales Legislative Assembly since 2019, representing Coffs Harbour for the Nationals. He has served as leader of the NSW Nationals since November 2025.

== Early life ==
A Sikh of Punjabi descent, Singh's family has lived around Woolgoolga since the 1890s, working in the horticulture industry. He is a fourth-generation Australian, with his great-grandfather Bella Singh migrated from Punjab, then part of the British Raj, in 1895 with 13 other men. Despite his family having lived in Australia for multiple generations, speaks both Punjabi and English fluently. Singh was a blueberry and macadamia farmer before his election to parliament.

== Political career ==
In June 2024, Singh was elected Deputy Leader of the New South Wales National Party.

In November 2025, Singh was elected the leader of the New South Wales National Party, the day after Dugald Saunders resigned. He became the first person of Sikh descent to lead a major party in Australia.

== Political views ==
Singh stated his support for "reliable and clean energy" in his 2019 maiden speech. He said to The Sydney Morning Herald following his election as leader that metropolitan areas should contain more wind and solar plants, and that he would be open to government funding of nuclear energy facilities.

New South Wales Legislative Assembly
Preceded by Andrew Fraser	Member for Coffs Harbour; 2019–present	Incumbent
