= New South Wales Liberal Party =

Political party in Australia

New South Wales Liberal Party The Liberal Party of Australia, New South Wales Division
- Abbreviation: NSWLP; LPNSW; LIB; LP
- Leader: Kellie Sloane
- Deputy Leader: Natalie Ward
- President: Peter Collins
- State Director: Mark Neeham
- Founder: Robert Menzies
- Founded: 16 October 1944; 81 years ago
- Preceded by: Liberal Democratic Party; United Australia Party
- Headquarters: Level 2, 131 Macquarie Street, Sydney, New South Wales 2000
- Youth wing: NSW Young Liberals
- Membership (2023): ▲12,963
- Ideology: Liberalism (Australia); Conservatism (Australia); Factions: Social liberalism; Social conservatism
- Political position: Centre-right to right-wing
- National affiliation: Liberal Party of Australia (Coalition)
- State affiliation: Liberal–National Coalition
- Colours: Blue
- Legislative Assembly: 24 / 93
- Legislative Council: 9 / 42
- House of Representatives: 5 / 46 (NSW seats)
- Senate: 4 / 12 (NSW seats)
- Local Government: 115 / 1,480

Website
- nswliberal.org.au

The New South Wales Liberal Party, officially called The Liberal Party of Australia, New South Wales Division, and colloquially known as the NSW Liberals, is the state division of the Liberal Party of Australia in New South Wales. The party is currently in Opposition in New South Wales in a coalition with the National Party. The party is part of the federal Liberal Party.

Following the Liberal Party's formation in October 1944, the NSW division of the Liberal Party was formed in January 1945. For the following months, the Democratic Party and Liberal Democratic Party joined the Liberal Party and were replaced by the new party's NSW division.

In the 74 years since its foundation, the party has won eight state elections to the Labor Party's 13, and has spent 27 years in office (1965 to 1976, 1988 to 1995 and 2011 to 2023) to Labor's 46. Nine leaders have become Premier of New South Wales; of those, five, Sir Robert Askin, Nick Greiner, Barry O'Farrell, Mike Baird and Gladys Berejiklian, have won at least one state election.

== History ==
=== Background ===
After the 1943 federal election, the Liberal Democratic Party (LDP), Commonwealth Party, and what remained of the United Australia Party (UAP)'s NSW branch began discussions on a merger to form a new party, proposed to be also named Democratic Party. The Liberal Democratic Party (NSW) were new parties formed a few months prior in April and May 1943 respectively. By November 1943, discussions were almost completed and unity was likely. The County Party refused to join in the merger but expressed they would co-operate with the new party. However, during the unity conference on 24 November 1943, the LDP walked out of the conference as they were not willing to support retaining the secretary of the UAP, H. W. Horsfield, as the secretary of the new party, as well as retaining members of his staff. Instead, during the same conference, the Commonwealth Party and the New South Wales UAP proceeded to merge without the LDP to form the Democratic Party. As such, LDP remained a separate party to the Democratic Party.

The initial leader of the Democratic Party was the former premier Alexander Mair, but he resigned on 2 February 1944 and was replaced by Reginald Weaver on 10 February.

In the lead up to the 1944 state election in May, the LDP party generated publicity disproportionate to its size and the Sydney Morning Herald commented that the Liberal Democratic Party was "a mouse" attempting to "swallow the Democratic Party lion". At the election, the Democratic Party led by Weaver won 19% of the vote and 12 of the 90 seats in the Legislative Assembly. However, the LDP received less than 4% of the primary vote and did not win a seat.

Horsfield, the secretary of the Democratic Party, resigned on 26 July 1944, paving the way for a LDP-Democratic merger again. In August 1944, the LDP, still led by Ernest White, initially agreed to merge with the Democratic Party and the new party to be known as the United Democratic Party. However, two days after federal UAP leader Robert Menzies announced that he was planning to set up a new "political movement with a Liberal policy" at an October conference, negotiations between LDP and Democratic Party broke down and the party merger did not take place.

=== Founding of Liberal Party ===
In October 1944, Menzies founded the Liberal Party of Australia during a conference in Canberra as announced in August, attended by LDP and Democratic Party delegates. The New South Wales division of the Liberal Party was formed on 4 January 1945 with a provisional executive appointed, consisting of 20 LDP and Democratic Party members including White, Weaver and Bill Spooner. Spooner, who was nominated by the LDP, was appointed as the first chairman on 9 January.

The LDP was willing to support the formation of the Liberal Party and dissolved itself on 15 January 1945, officially joining the Liberal Party. The Democratic Party also supported the formation but held off dissolution until a state branch of the Liberal Party had been fully constituted. Weaver and parliamentary members of the Democratic Party were dissatisfied with the Liberal Party executive's attitude towards Democratic Party members and supporters, with Weaver tendering his resignation from the provisional council of the state Liberal Party in February 1945. However, he withdrew his resignation in March 1945, and announced that all Democratic Party parliamentary members would join the Liberal Party.

In the 1945 Ryde state by-election in February, Liberal member Eric Hearnshaw was elected to the New South Wales parliament. As Democratic Party parliamentary members including Weaver at that time had not yet joined the Liberal Party, this made Hearnshaw the first Liberal Party member in the New South Wales parliament. Weaver and other Democratic parliamentary members finally joined the Liberal Party on 20 April 1945, with Weaver becoming the first parliamentary leader of the NSW Liberal Party. On the same day, Albert Reid, independent member for Manly and a former UAP member, also joined the Liberal Party. This brought the total number of Liberal Party legislative assembly members to 14.

Weaver died later in the year in November and he was succeeded by Mair as NSW Liberal Party leader. Mair resigned four months later in March 1946 to contest the Australian Senate, and was succeeded by Vernon Treatt as party leader. Treatt led the Liberal Party opposition in the state parliament for the next eight years.

=== 2011 to 2023 in Government ===
The Liberal/National Coalition won a landslide victory in the 2011 state election, with the Liberal Party winning 51 of the 93 lower house seats, enough for a majority in its own right. Liberal leader Barry O'Farrell opted to retain the Coalition. The Coalition has since governed New South Wales under Liberal leaders Mike Baird, Gladys Berejiklian and Dominic Perrottet, the former two winning the 2015 state election and 2019 state election respectively. The 2019 election was significant as it was the first time that the Coalition won a third consecutive term in office in New South Wales since the 1971 state election. It was also the first that a female leader (Gladys Berejiklian) led a party to a state election victory in New South Wales, and the first time a non-Labor female leader won a state election in Australia. Berejiklian stepped down on 5 October 2021 and was replaced as party leader and Premier by Perrottet.

In the March 2023 state election, the Liberal Party lost to a minority Labor Government led by Chris Minns. The Liberal Party has been led by Kellie Sloane since 21 November 2025.

On 14 August 2024 after nominations for the 2024 Local Government elections had closed at midday the Liberal Party announced they had not nominated several previously endorsed candidates. In September 2024, the state executive was suspended by the Federal Liberals.

=== 2026 ICAC investigation ===
In July 2026, the NSW Independent Commission Against Corruption started public hearings for Operation Rosny. Operation Rosny is an investigation into allegations that senior Liberal Party officials had been involved in a smear campaign to oust David Chandler, the NSW building commissioner, and former police minister, Liberal Party MP David Elliott at the behest of fugitive property developer Jean Nassif. Under New South Wales law, property developers or their proxies donating on their behalf are prohibited from making political donations. Nassif, who fled Australia to avoid an arrest warrant over alleged fraud offences, had supported a group of conservative Christian, right sub-faction Liberal operatives, known as "The Reformers". The group included two brothers of former Premier Dominic Perrottet. The group was formed to influence government decisions, for branch stacking and to influence preselection for Liberal Party candidates. David Elliott testified to ICAC that he had come to believe that “a cult had taken over the [Liberal] party” after branch stacking by the party’s religious right faction.

State opposition leader, Kellie Sloane, stated that she was not entirely across the allegations and had learned of them through reading newspapers. Nassif allegedly paid a total of $2,000,000 AUD to Reformers members Christian Ellis, Charles Perrottet and Jeremy Greenwood. Hotel baron Michael O’Hara paid $165,000 and Catholic Schools NSW, a peak body for the approximately 600 private diocese Catholic schools, through decisions made by executive Dallas McInerney donated over $250,000.

== Preselection procedures ==
In 2018, the New South Wales Liberal Party agreed to adopt new rules for preselecting candidates, which were championed by former Prime Minister and incumbent Liberal member for Warringah Tony Abbott who is aligned with the right wing faction of the party. The rules, known as Warringah rules, gave local branches the right to hold plebiscites involving all eligible branch members to choose local, state and federal candidates. The party's state executive and the state council would still get 25% of the votes. It was reported that the right faction pushed for the rules as it believed members were more conservative than the state executive which were controlled by moderate members of the party.

=== 2022 federal election ===
On 30 November 2021, the party was unable to hold its scheduled Annual General Meeting (AGM) to select members of the state executive due to complications from COVID-19. Immigration Minister Alex Hawke, who was the representative of federal party leader and Prime Minister Scott Morrison, also allegedly failed to attend internal Liberal Party nomination review committee meetings.

Not holding an AGM could constitute a breach in the party constitution, which meant that the state executive could not continue in office after 28 February 2022, and this would mean that the federal executive would have to step in to choose New South Wales candidates for 2022 federal election, due in May 2022. The Supreme Court of New South Wales ruled that the state executive could still continue after this date. On 2 March 2022, the state executive tried to fast-track pre-selection plebiscites in seats that did not have candidates finalised, by overriding the constitutional requirements for plebiscites with special powers. However, this did not attain the required 90% state executive support to do so. On 4 March, the federal executive voted to temporarily dissolve the state party and a committee was set up to take over the management of the state party until 8 March, "in accordance with clause 12.3 of the federal constitution of the Liberal Party". The committee, made up of Morrison, Perrottet, and former party president Chris McDiven, had direct control in endorsing candidates without preselection challenges. The committee confirmed the pre-selection of three incumbent federal members of parliament, two of whom were ministers on 8 March. The federal executive also gave the state party until 25 March 2022 to finalise candidates in other federal seats. While the Senate candidates could be finalised, the state party was still unable to do so for a number of seats by 27 March 2022. As a result, on that day, the federal executive voted to temporarily dissolve the state party for the second time and appointed the same Morrison-led committee to preselect candidates in other remaining unfinalised seats until 2 April. Pre-selection ballots intended to be held for these seats in the coming week were all cancelled.

Members who opposed overriding local branch preselection include Sydney businessman Matthew Camenzuli, who was a member of the state executive. As of 30 March 2022, these members had brought the matter to court, seeking to challenge the legitimacy of the committee's preselection of the three incumbent members of parliament on 8 March 2022 and nine other candidates on 2 April 2022. Morrison and Perrottet have urged them to take the matter to the High Court of Australia instead so that the result cannot be appealed further. On 5 April, the New South Wales Court of Appeal ruled that the court had no jurisdiction to make decisions relating to the constitutions of political parties, thereby ruling the preselection of the 12 candidates valid. Camenzuli brought the matter further to High Court for appeal but it was dismissed on 8 April. Camenzuli was also expelled from the party.

== Leadership ==
Leader of the Liberal Party
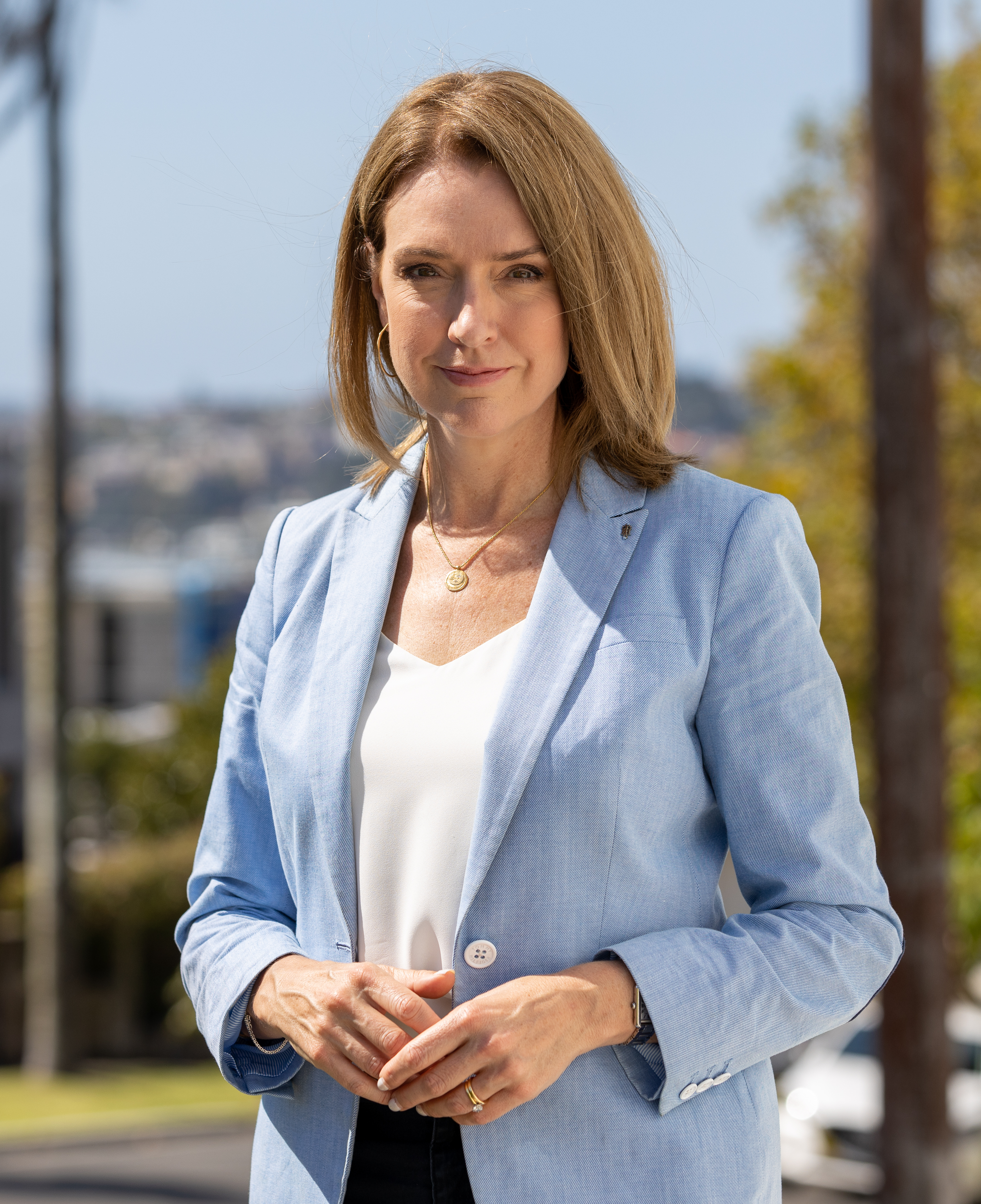
- Incumbent; Kellie Sloane since 21 November 2025
- Inaugural holder: Reginald Weaver
- Formation: 20 April 1945
- Deputy: Natalie Ward

The position of leader of the Liberal Party of Australia New South Wales Division is a formal role held by a Liberal member of the Parliament of New South Wales. As the Liberal Party has, since its foundation in 1945, been either the largest or second largest party in the New South Wales Legislative Assembly, its leader is usually either the Premier or the Leader of the Opposition, depending on the majority or minority respectively of the party. The current leader of the Liberal Party is Kellie Sloane, and the deputy leader is Natalie Ward.

The role is selected by state members of the parliamentary party, but the position is non-fixed in duration, and is usually only vacated upon resignation, retirement from politics, or a spill motion with the support of the majority of the parliamentary members.

The leader only has a role in a parliamentary context; the party division as a whole is governed by a President and Vice-Presidents, who act on the advice of the party division's Director and Deputy Directors. The division also gathers annually at a State Conference to vote on and develop policy to be used by the party's elected representatives. The majority of the twenty Liberal Leaders resigned after losing elections or were deposed by other parliamentary members.

=== Parliamentary party leaders ===
#	Party leader	Portrait	Electorate while leader	Tenure			Election contested	Premier
#	Party leader	Portrait	Electorate while leader	Took office	Left office	Time in office	Election contested	Premier
1	Reginald Weaver (1876–1945)		Neutral Bay	20 April 1945	12 November 1945	206 days	None	McKell (1941–1947)
2	Alexander Mair (1889–1969)		Albury	13 November 1945	20 March 1946	127 days	None	McKell (1941–1947)
3	Sir Vernon Treatt (1897–1984)		Woollahra	20 March 1946	10 August 1954	8 years, 143 days	1947 1950 1953	McKell (1941–1947)
3	Sir Vernon Treatt (1897–1984)		Woollahra	20 March 1946	10 August 1954	8 years, 143 days	1947 1950 1953	McGirr (1947–1952)
3	Sir Vernon Treatt (1897–1984)		Woollahra	20 March 1946	10 August 1954	8 years, 143 days	1947 1950 1953	Cahill (1952–1959)
4	Murray Robson (1906–1974)		Vaucluse	17 August 1954	20 September 1955	1 year, 34 days	None	Cahill (1952–1959)
5	Pat Morton (1910–1999)		Mosman	20 September 1955	17 July 1959	3 years, 300 days	1956 1959	Cahill (1952–1959)
6	Sir Robert Askin (1907–1981)		Collaroy (to 1973)	17 July 1959	3 January 1975	15 years, 170 days	1962 1965 1968 1971 1973	Cahill (1952–1959)
6	Sir Robert Askin (1907–1981)		Collaroy (to 1973)	17 July 1959	3 January 1975	15 years, 170 days	1962 1965 1968 1971 1973	Heffron (1959–1964)
6	Sir Robert Askin (1907–1981)		Pittwater (from 1973)	17 July 1959	3 January 1975	15 years, 170 days	1962 1965 1968 1971 1973	Renshaw (1964–1965)
6	Sir Robert Askin (1907–1981)		Pittwater (from 1973)	17 July 1959	3 January 1975	15 years, 170 days	1962 1965 1968 1971 1973	Himself (1965–1975)
7	Tom Lewis (1922–2016)		Wollondilly	3 January 1975	23 January 1976	1 year, 20 days	None	Himself (1975–1976)
8	Sir Eric Willis (1922–1999)		Earlwood	23 January 1976	16 December 1977	1 year, 327 days	1976	Himself (1976–1976)
8	Sir Eric Willis (1922–1999)		Earlwood	23 January 1976	16 December 1977	1 year, 327 days	1976	Wran (1976–1986)
9	Peter Coleman (1928–2019)		Fuller	16 December 1977	7 October 1978	295 days	1978	Wran (1976–1986)
10	John Mason (1928–)		Dubbo	24 October 1978	29 May 1981	2 years, 217 days	None	Wran (1976–1986)
11	Bruce McDonald (1935–)		Kirribilli	1 June 1981	12 October 1981	133 days	1981	Wran (1976–1986)
12	John Dowd (1940–)		Lane Cove	20 October 1981	15 March 1983	1 year, 146 days	None	Wran (1976–1986)
13	Nick Greiner (1947–)		Ku-ring-gai	15 March 1983	24 June 1992	9 years, 101 days	1984 1988 1991	Wran (1976–1986)
13	Nick Greiner (1947–)		Ku-ring-gai	15 March 1983	24 June 1992	9 years, 101 days	1984 1988 1991	Unsworth (1986–1988)
13	Nick Greiner (1947–)		Ku-ring-gai	15 March 1983	24 June 1992	9 years, 101 days	1984 1988 1991	Himself (1988–1992)
14	John Fahey (1945–2020)		Southern Highlands	24 June 1992	4 April 1995	2 years, 284 days	1995	Himself (1992–1995)
15	Peter Collins (1947–)		Willoughby	4 April 1995	7 December 1998	3 years, 247 days	None	Carr (1995–2005)
16	Kerry Chikarovski (1956–)		Lane Cove	7 December 1998	28 March 2002	3 years, 111 days	1999	Carr (1995–2005)
17	John Brogden (1969–)		Pittwater	28 March 2002	29 August 2005	3 years, 154 days	2003	Carr (1995–2005)
17	John Brogden (1969–)		Pittwater	28 March 2002	29 August 2005	3 years, 154 days	2003	Iemma (2005–2008)
18	Peter Debnam (1954–)		Vaucluse	1 September 2005	4 April 2007	1 year, 218 days	2007	Iemma (2005–2008)
19	Barry O'Farrell (1959–)		Ku-ring-gai	4 April 2007	16 April 2014	7 years, 9 days	2011	Iemma (2005–2008)
19	Barry O'Farrell (1959–)		Ku-ring-gai	4 April 2007	16 April 2014	7 years, 9 days	2011	Rees (2008–2009)
19	Barry O'Farrell (1959–)		Ku-ring-gai	4 April 2007	16 April 2014	7 years, 9 days	2011	Keneally (2009–2011)
19	Barry O'Farrell (1959–)		Ku-ring-gai	4 April 2007	16 April 2014	7 years, 9 days	2011	Himself (2011–2014)
20	Mike Baird (1968–)		Manly	17 April 2014	23 January 2017	2 years, 282 days	2015	Himself (2014–2017)
21	Gladys Berejiklian (1970–)		Willoughby	23 January 2017	5 October 2021	4 years, 255 days	2019	Herself (2017–2021)
22	Dominic Perrottet (1982–)		Epping	5 October 2021	25 March 2023	1 year, 171 days	2023	Himself (2021–2023)
23	Mark Speakman (1959–)		Cronulla	21 April 2023	20 November 2025	2 years, 213 days	None	Minns (2023–)
24	Kellie Sloane (1973–)		Vaucluse	21 November 2025	incumbent	319 days	None	Minns (2023–)

=== Deputy leaders ===
Party Leader	Start of Term	End of Term
Athol Richardson	1945	1945
Vernon Treatt	1946	1946
Walter Howarth	1946	1954
Robert Askin	1954	1959
Eric Willis	1959	1975
John Maddison	1975	1977
John Mason	1977	1978
Bruce McDonald	1978	1981
Jim Cameron	1981	1981
Kevin Rozzoli	1981	1983
Rosemary Foot	1983	1986
Peter Collins	1986	1992
Bruce Baird	1992	1994
Kerry Chikarovski	1994	1995
Ron Phillips	1995	1999
Barry O'Farrell	1999	2002
Chris Hartcher	2002	2003
Barry O'Farrell	2003	2007
Jillian Skinner	2007	2014
Gladys Berejiklian	2014	2017
Dominic Perrottet	2017	2021
Stuart Ayres	2021	2022
Matt Kean	2022	2023
Natalie Ward	2023	present

== Electoral performance ==
=== Legislative Assembly ===
Election	Leader	Votes	%	Seats	+/–	Position	Status
1947	Vernon Treatt	470,485	29.60	18 / 90	▲6	▲2nd	Opposition
1950	Vernon Treatt	604,428	37.51	29 / 94	▲11	2nd	Opposition
1953	Vernon Treatt	432,739	27.94	22 / 94	▼9	2nd	Opposition
1956	Pat Morton	594,740	35.11	27 / 94	▲5	2nd	Opposition
1959	Pat Morton	603,718	35.35	28 / 94	▲1	2nd	Opposition
1962	Bob Askin	671,716	34.85	25 / 94	▼3	2nd	Opposition
1965	Bob Askin	807,868	39.59	31 / 94	▲6	▲1st	Minority coalition
1968	Bob Askin	831,514	38.47	39 / 94	▲4	▼2nd	Majority coalition
1971	Bob Askin	799,801	35.74	32 / 96	▼7	2nd	Majority coalition
1973	Bob Askin	843,325	33.85	34 / 99	▲2	2nd	Majority coalition
1976	Eric Willis	978,886	36.29	30 / 99	▼4	2nd	Opposition
1978	Peter Coleman	754,796	26.98	18 / 99	▼12	2nd	Opposition
1981	Bruce McDonald	775,463	27.62	14 / 99	▼4	2nd	Opposition
1984	Nick Greiner	967,395	32.17	22 / 99	▲8	2nd	Opposition
1988	Nick Greiner	1,147,613	35.80	39 / 109	▲17	2nd	Majority coalition
1991	Nick Greiner	1,053,100	34.16	32 / 99	▼7	2nd	Minority coalition
1995	John Fahey	1,121,190	32.84	29 / 99	▼3	2nd	Opposition
1999	Kerry Chikarovski	927,368	24.82	20 / 93	▼9	2nd	Opposition
2003	John Brogden	944,888	24.72	20 / 93	0	2nd	Opposition
2007	Peter Debnam	1,061,269	26.94	22 / 93	▲2	2nd	Opposition
2011	Barry O'Farrell	1,602,457	38.58	51 / 93	▲29	▲1st	Majority coalition
2015	Mike Baird	1,545,168	35.08	37 / 93	▼14	1st	Majority coalition
2019	Gladys Berejiklian	1,456,010	31.99	35 / 93	▼2	▼2nd	Majority coalition
2023	Dominic Perrottet	1,259,253	26.78	25 / 93	▼10	2nd	Opposition
2027	Kellie Sloane	TBA	TBA	TBA	TBA	TBA	TBA

== See also ==
- New South Wales National Party
