= Screen NSW =

Government agency of New South Wales

- Predecessor: NSW Film & Television Office, New South Wales Film Corporation
- Type: Governmental organisation
- Location: Sydney, Australia
- Region served: New South Wales
- Executive Director: Kylie Munnich
- Website: www.screen.nsw.gov.au

Screen NSW, formerly known as the New South Wales Film and Television Office, or FTO, and before that the New South Wales Film Corporation, is the NSW Government's screen agency, which supports the screen and digital games industries through a range of initiatives and promotes New South Wales as a premier screen destination. Screen NSW is its own division, as part of the Department of Creative Industries, Tourism, Hospitality and Sport.

Between 1 April 2017 and 31 October 2024, it was part of Create NSW, an NSW Government agency that is responsible for supporting and promoting the arts, artists and the various cultural bodies within the state of New South Wales in Australia. The name "Screen NSW" ceased to exist within Create NSW between 1 April 2017 and September 2019, when a restructure resurrected the brand. On 1 November 2024, a department restructure split Screen NSW and Sound NSW from Create NSW, moving Screen NSW into a new 24-Hour Economy, Screen and Sound division. On 22 December 2025, Screen NSW became a standalone division in the Department of Creative Industries, Tourism, Hospitality and Sport.

As of 16 March 2026, Kylie Munnich is the Executive Director, Screen NSW. From 2022–2025, Kyas Hepworth was the Head of Screen NSW.

== History ==
The New South Wales Film Corporation was established as a statutory body in 1977. It was dissolved by the Film Industry Act 1988, with all of its functions taken over by the newly created New South Wales Film and Television Office (known as the FTO).

On 5 June 2009, the FTO announced a name change to Screen NSW, to reflect the age of digital media, and from 1 July 2009 Screen NSW was transferred from the Department of Arts, Sport and Recreation to the Department of Industry and Investment. From 4 April 2011, when the department name was changed, Screen NSW became a branch of the Department of Trade and Investment, Regional Infrastructure and Services.

The agency was led by chief executive Courtney Gibson from November 2015. Under the old structure, the chief executive was responsible to the executive director of Arts NSW, who was in turn responsible to the Secretary of the Department of Justice. The agency previously advised the Minister for the Arts.

On 1 April 2017, Screen NSW was amalgamated with Arts NSW to form Create NSW. The Screen NSW banner was removed, CEO Courtney Gibson left the role, and Michael Brealey, then acting executive director of Arts NSW, became CEO of the new agency.

Create NSW fell within the Arts, Screen and Culture Division of the Department of Planning and Environment (abolished on 1 July 2019). As a result of a government restructure in April 2019 after a state election, Create NSW was moved to the Minister for the Public Service and Employee Relations, Aboriginal Affairs, and the Arts, then held by Don Harwin and administered through the Community Engagement portfolio of the Department of Premier and Cabinet headed by Deputy Secretary, Community Engagement, Clare Foy.

In September 2019, a restructuring of the leadership team of Create NSW led to the resurrection of the Screen NSW brand, and Grainne Brunsdon appointed head of that team, which remained part of Create NSW.

After Harwin's resignation on 10 April 2020, the Premier, Gladys Berejiklian, took over the arts portfolio.

In July 2022, respected screen and arts executive Kyas Hepworth was appointed Head of Screen NSW.

Following the 2023 NSW state election, on 6 April 2023 John Graham was appointed Minister for the Arts.

On 1 November 2024, a department restructure split Screen NSW and Sound NSW from the arts agency, Create NSW, into a new division. Screen NSW moved to sit within the 24-Hour Economy, Screen and Sound division, as part of the Department of Creative Industries, Tourism, Hospitality and Sport.

The NSW Screen and Digital Games Strategy 2025-27 was announced on 16 October 2024.

In December 2025, it was announced that Kyas Hepworth was leaving Screen NSW. Under her leadership, Hepworth "led the state’s Screen and Digital Games Strategy 2025-27, which included setting growth targets for the sector, strengthening funding and infrastructure planning, and bolstering support for First Nations and diverse creatives."

In March 2026, former Screen Queensland CEO Kylie Munnich was appointed as Executive Director, Screen NSW.

== Description ==
Screen NSW aims to promote Australia's cultural identity, encourage employment in all aspects of screen production, encourage investment in the industry, enhance the industry's export potential, encourage innovation and enhance quality in the industry.

It receives recurrent funding on an annual basis from the NSW Government; it then allocates funding across its programs for that year. It provides funding for items such as production finance, festival travel and an industry development fund. It offers incentives for filming in the state of New South Wales, and helps to provide opportunities for Indigenous Australian filmmakers.

Production funding allocations are guided by ratios linking the Screen NSW contribution to the amount spent by the production in NSW state.

== See also ==
- Film and television financing in Australia
- List of film production companies
- List of television production companies
- VicScreen
- List of New South Wales Government Agencies
- Screen Australia
- South Australian Film Corporation
