= Minister for Aboriginal Affairs and Treaty =

Government minister in New South Wales, Australia

- Incumbent; David Harris since 5 April 2023
- Premier's Department
- Style: The Honourable
- Appointer: Governor of New South Wales
- Inaugural holder: Frank Walker
- Formation: 2 October 1981

The New South Wales Minister for Aboriginal Affairs and Treaty is a minister in the Government of New South Wales with responsibility for administering legislation and policy in relation to that state's indigenous Australians in the state of New South Wales, Australia.

The current Minister for Aboriginal Affairs is David Harris, who also holds the portfolios of Gaming and Racing and Veterans, appointed with effect from 5 April 2023. The minister administers the portfolio through Aboriginal Affairs NSW, an agency of the Premier's Department, as well as a range of additional government agencies.

Ultimately, the minister is responsible to the Parliament of New South Wales.

== Office history ==
The first Minister for Aboriginal Affairs, Frank Walker, was appointed by the Labor Government of Neville Wran on 2 October 1981 and a "Ministry of Aboriginal Affairs" was established on 1 January 1982. This role replaced the Aboriginal Affairs responsibilities of the Minister for Youth and Community Services (the last being Kevin Stewart). Prior to 1969 Aboriginal Affairs was within the purview of the Chief Secretary. The new ministry had responsibilities for advising the Government on "how and where land rights for Aboriginal people might be granted" and for the provision of services to Aboriginal communities.

On 15 April 1988, the Ministry was abolished and its responsibilities were transferred to the new "Bureau of Aboriginal Affairs" within the Premier’s Department. The Bureau was renamed to the "Office of Aboriginal Affairs" by June 1988 and was charged with the administration of the Aboriginal Land Rights Act, 1983 (NSW) and the administration of Aboriginal Land Councils. On 1 July 1993, the Office of Aboriginal Affairs was established as an administrative office independent of the Premier's Department responsible to the Minister for Aboriginal Affairs.

On 6 April 1995 the Office was abolished and was transferred to the "Department of Aboriginal Affairs". On 1 July 2009 the Department was abolished as an independent body and was subordinated to the new Department of Human Services. On 4 April 2011, the Department was renamed "Aboriginal Affairs NSW" and was transferred to the Department of Education and Communities within the Office of Communities. In July 2015 the Office of Communities was abolished but Aboriginal Affairs remained within the parent Department of Education.

Following the 2019 state election, Aboriginal Affairs NSW was transferred from the Department of Education to the Department of Premier and Cabinet, with Don Harwin appointed as Minister for the Public Service and Employee Relations, Aboriginal Affairs, and the Arts.

== List of ministers ==
Ministerial title	Minister	Party	Ministry	Term start	Term end	Time in office	Notes
Minister for Aboriginal Affairs	Frank Walker	Labor	Wran (4) (5)	2 October 1981	10 February 1984	2 years, 131 days	
Minister for Aboriginal Affairs	Paul Whelan	Labor	Wran (6)	10 February 1984	5 April 1984	55 days	
Minister for Aboriginal Affairs	George Paciullo	Labor	Wran (7)	5 April 1984	6 February 1986	1 year, 307 days	
Minister for Aboriginal Affairs	Peter Anderson	Labor	Wran (8)	6 February 1986	4 July 1986	148 days	
Minister for Aboriginal Affairs	Ken Gabb	Labor	Unsworth	4 July 1986	21 March 1988	1 year, 261 days	
Minister for Aboriginal Affairs	Jim Longley	Liberal	Fahey (3)	26 May 1993	4 April 1995	1 year, 313 days	
Minister for Aboriginal Affairs	Andrew Refshauge	Labor	Carr (1) (2) (3) (4)	4 April 1995	3 August 2005	10 years, 121 days	
Minister for Aboriginal Affairs	Carmel Tebbutt	Labor	Iemma (1)	3 August 2005	10 August 2005	7 days	
Minister for Aboriginal Affairs	Milton Orkopoulos	Labor	Iemma (1)	10 August 2005	8 November 2006	1 year, 90 days	
Minister for Aboriginal Affairs	Reba Meagher	Labor	Iemma (1)	8 November 2006	2 April 2007	145 days	
Minister for Aboriginal Affairs	Paul Lynch	Labor	Iemma (2); Rees; Keneally	2 April 2007	28 March 2011	4 years, 1 day	
Minister for Aboriginal Affairs	Victor Dominello	Liberal	O'Farrell; Baird (1)	3 April 2011	2 April 2015	3 years, 364 days	
Minister for Aboriginal Affairs	Leslie Williams	National	Baird (2)	2 April 2015	30 January 2017	1 year, 303 days	
Minister for Aboriginal Affairs	Sarah Mitchell	National	Berejiklian (1)	30 January 2017	23 March 2019	2 years, 52 days	
Minister for the Public Service and Employee Relations, Aboriginal Affairs, and the Arts	Don Harwin	Liberal	Berejiklian (2)	2 April 2019	15 April 2020	1 year, 13 days	
Minister for the Public Service and Employee Relations, Aboriginal Affairs, and the Arts	Gladys Berejiklian (acting)	Liberal	Berejiklian (2)	15 April 2020	3 July 2020	79 days	
Minister for the Public Service and Employee Relations, Aboriginal Affairs, and the Arts	Don Harwin	Liberal	Berejiklian (2); Perrottet (1)	3 July 2020	21 December 2021	1 year, 171 days	
Minister for Aboriginal Affairs	Ben Franklin	National	Perrottet (2)	21 December 2021	28 March 2023	1 year, 97 days	
Special Minister of State	John Graham	Labor	Minns	28 March 2023	5 April 2023	8 days	
Minister for Aboriginal Affairs and Treaty	David Harris	Labor	Minns	5 April 2023	incumbent	3 years, 227 days	

== See also ==
- List of New South Wales government agencies
