= Berejiklian ministry (2017–2019) =

New South Wales government ministry led by Gladys Berejiklian

First Berejiklian ministry
- 96th Cabinet of New South Wales

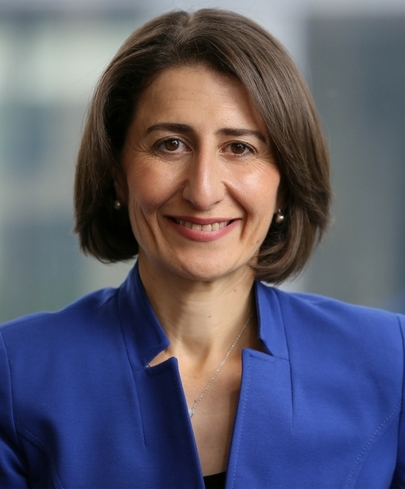
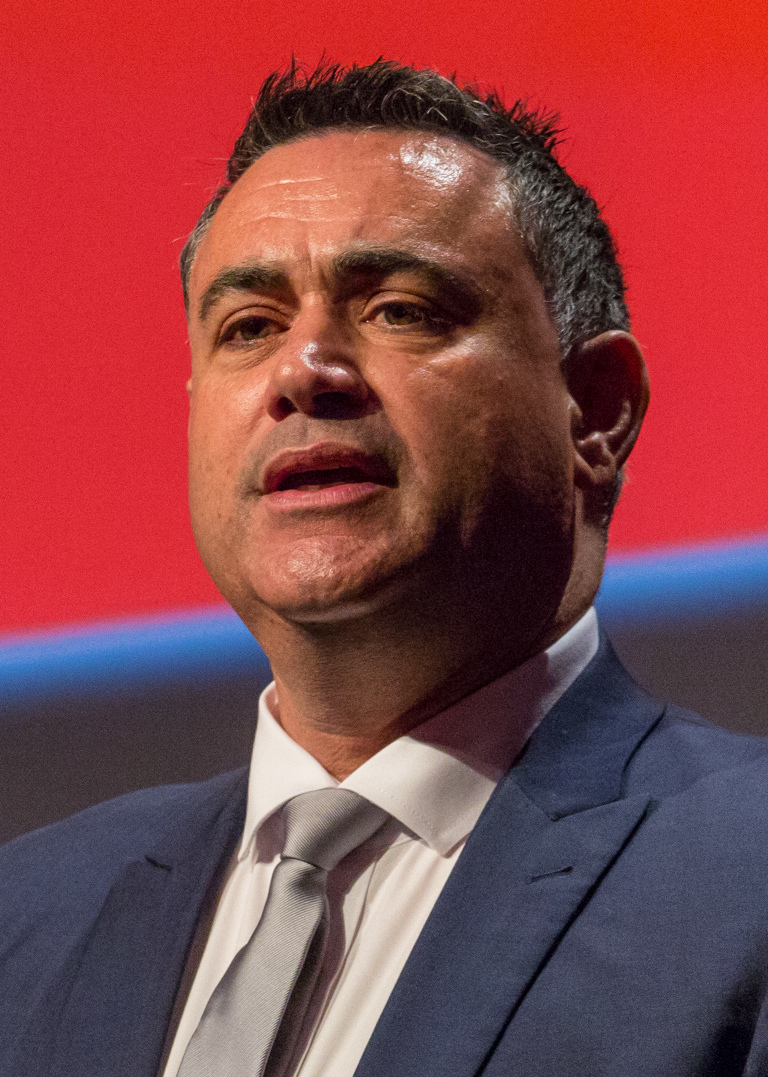
- Gladys Berejiklian John Barilaro
- Date formed: 23 January 2017
- Date dissolved: 23 March 2019

People and organisations
- Monarch: Queen Elizabeth II
- Governor: David Hurley
- Premier: Gladys Berejiklian
- Deputy Premier: John Barilaro
- No. of ministers: 23
- Total no. of members: 23
- Member party: Liberal–National Coalition
- Status in legislature: Majority Coalition Government
- Opposition cabinet: New South Wales Shadow Cabinet
- Opposition party: Labor
- Opposition leader: Luke Foley (2017–2018); Michael Daley (2018–2019)

History
- Outgoing election: 2019 state election
- Predecessor: Second Baird ministry
- Successor: Second Berejiklian ministry

The First Berejiklian ministry was the 96th ministry of the Government of New South Wales, and was led by Gladys Berejiklian, the state's 45th Premier.

The Liberal–National coalition ministry was formed on 23 January 2017, immediately following the resignation of the previous Premier, Mike Baird. Berejiklian and Nationals leader, John Barilaro, were sworn in at Government House, Sydney by Governor David Hurley on the same day.

On 29 January, Premier Berejiklian announced a reorganisation of the ministry, with the full ministry sworn in by the Governor on 30 January 2017.

The ministry covered the period from 23 January 2017 until 23 March 2019 when the 2019 state election was held, resulting in the re-election of the Coalition; with Berejiklian as leader and the Second Berejiklian ministry being formed.

== Composition of ministry ==
Portfolio	Minister	Party	Term start	Term end	Term in office
Premier	Gladys Berejiklian	Liberal	23 January 2017	23 March 2019	2 years, 59 days
Deputy Premier	John Barilaro	National	23 January 2017	23 March 2019	2 years, 59 days
Minister for Regional New South Wales	John Barilaro	National	23 January 2017	23 March 2019	2 years, 59 days
Minister for Skills	John Barilaro	National	23 January 2017	23 March 2019	2 years, 59 days
Minister for Small Business	John Barilaro	National	23 January 2017	23 March 2019	2 years, 59 days
Treasurer	Dominic Perrottet	Liberal	30 January 2017	23 March 2019	2 years, 52 days
Minister for Industrial Relations	Dominic Perrottet	Liberal	30 January 2017	23 March 2019	2 years, 52 days
Minister for Primary Industries	Niall Blair MLC	National	30 January 2017	23 March 2019	2 years, 52 days
Minister for Regional Water	Niall Blair MLC	National	30 January 2017	23 March 2019	2 years, 52 days
Minister for Trade and Industry	Niall Blair MLC	National	30 January 2017	23 March 2019	2 years, 52 days
Minister for Resources	Don Harwin MLC	Liberal	30 January 2017	23 March 2019	2 years, 52 days
Minister for Energy and Utilities	Don Harwin MLC	Liberal	30 January 2017	23 March 2019	2 years, 52 days
Minister for the Arts	Don Harwin MLC	Liberal	30 January 2017	23 March 2019	2 years, 52 days
Vice-President of the Executive Council; Leader of the Government in the Legislative Council	Don Harwin MLC	Liberal	30 January 2017	23 March 2019	2 years, 52 days
Minister for Planning	Anthony Roberts	Liberal	30 January 2017	23 March 2019	2 years, 52 days
Minister for Housing	Anthony Roberts	Liberal	30 January 2017	23 March 2019	2 years, 52 days
Special Minister of State	Anthony Roberts	Liberal	30 January 2017	23 March 2019	2 years, 52 days
Minister for Transport and Infrastructure	Andrew Constance	Liberal	30 January 2017	23 March 2019	2 years, 52 days
Minister for Health	Brad Hazzard	Liberal	30 January 2017	23 March 2019	2 years, 52 days
Minister for Medical Research	Brad Hazzard	Liberal	30 January 2017	23 March 2019	2 years, 52 days
Minister for Education	Rob Stokes	Liberal	30 January 2017	23 March 2019	2 years, 52 days
Attorney General	Mark Speakman	Liberal	30 January 2017	23 March 2019	2 years, 52 days
Minister for Police	Troy Grant	National	30 January 2017	23 March 2019	2 years, 52 days
Minister for Emergency Services	Troy Grant	National	30 January 2017	23 March 2019	2 years, 52 days
Minister for Finance, Services and Property	Victor Dominello	Liberal	30 January 2017	23 March 2019	2 years, 52 days
Minister for Family and Community Services	Pru Goward	Liberal	30 January 2017	23 March 2019	2 years, 52 days
Minister for Social Housing	Pru Goward	Liberal	30 January 2017	23 March 2019	2 years, 52 days
Minister for Prevention of Domestic Violence and Sexual Assault	Pru Goward	Liberal	30 January 2017	23 March 2019	2 years, 52 days
Minister for Lands and Forestry	Paul Toole	National	30 January 2017	23 March 2019	2 years, 52 days
Minister for Racing	Paul Toole	National	30 January 2017	23 March 2019	2 years, 52 days
Minister for Counter Terrorism	David Elliott	Liberal	30 January 2017	23 March 2019	2 years, 52 days
Minister for Corrections	David Elliott	Liberal	30 January 2017	23 March 2019	2 years, 52 days
Minister for Veterans Affairs	David Elliott	Liberal	30 January 2017	23 March 2019	2 years, 52 days
Minister for the Environment	Gabrielle Upton	Liberal	30 January 2017	23 March 2019	2 years, 52 days
Minister for Local Government	Gabrielle Upton	Liberal	30 January 2017	23 March 2019	2 years, 52 days
Minister for Heritage	Gabrielle Upton	Liberal	30 January 2017	23 March 2019	2 years, 52 days
Minister for Western Sydney	Stuart Ayres	Liberal	30 January 2017	23 March 2019	2 years, 52 days
Minister for WestConnex	Stuart Ayres	Liberal	30 January 2017	23 March 2019	2 years, 52 days
Minister for Sport	Stuart Ayres	Liberal	30 January 2017	23 March 2019	2 years, 52 days
Minister for Roads, Maritime and Freight	Melinda Pavey	National	30 January 2017	23 March 2019	2 years, 52 days
Minister for Innovation and Better Regulation	Matt Kean	Liberal	30 January 2017	23 March 2019	2 years, 52 days
Minister for Tourism and Major Events	Adam Marshall	National	30 January 2017	23 March 2019	2 years, 52 days
Assistant Minister for Skills	Adam Marshall	National	30 January 2017	23 March 2019	2 years, 52 days
Minister for Mental Health	Tanya Davies	Liberal	30 January 2017	23 March 2019	2 years, 52 days
Minister for Women	Tanya Davies	Liberal	30 January 2017	23 March 2019	2 years, 52 days
Minister for Ageing	Tanya Davies	Liberal	30 January 2017	23 March 2019	2 years, 52 days
Minister for Early Childhood Education	Sarah Mitchell MLC	National	30 January 2017	23 March 2019	2 years, 52 days
Minister for Aboriginal Affairs	Sarah Mitchell MLC	National	30 January 2017	23 March 2019	2 years, 52 days
Assistant Minister for Education	Sarah Mitchell MLC	National	30 January 2017	23 March 2019	2 years, 52 days
Minister for Multiculturalism	Ray Williams	Liberal	30 January 2017	23 March 2019	2 years, 52 days
Minister for Disability Services	Ray Williams	Liberal	30 January 2017	23 March 2019	2 years, 52 days

Ministers are members of the Legislative Assembly unless otherwise noted.

== See also ==
- Members of the New South Wales Legislative Assembly, 2015–2019
- Members of the New South Wales Legislative Council, 2015–2019

Preceded by Second Baird ministry	First Berejiklian ministry 2017–2019	Succeeded by Second Berejiklian ministry
