= Ben Franklin (Australian politician) =

Australian politician

The Honourable Ben Franklin MLC
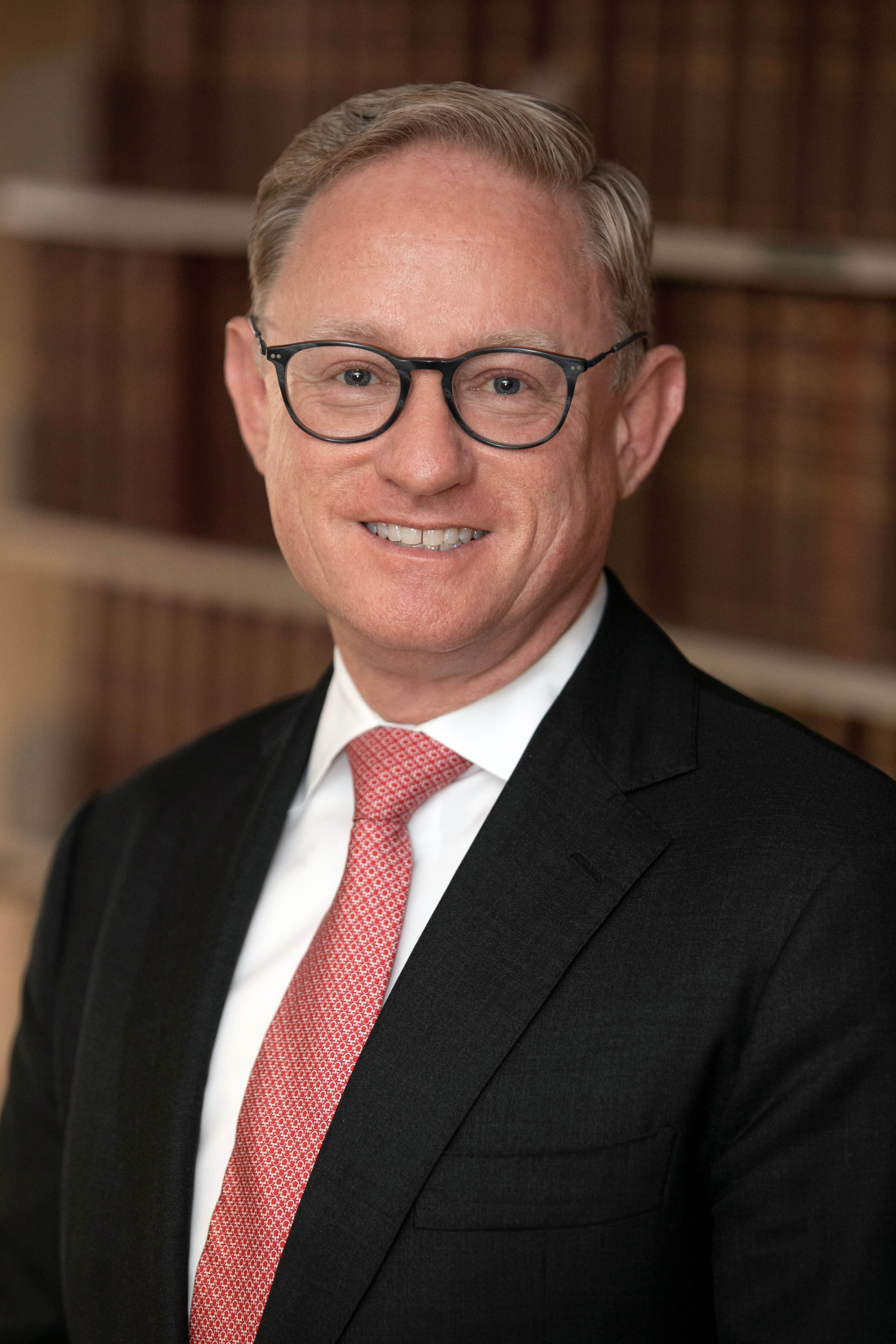
- Official portrait, 2023

President of the New South Wales Legislative Council
- Incumbent
- Assumed office 9 May 2023
- Preceded by: Matthew Mason-Cox

Member of the New South Wales Legislative Council
- Incumbent
- Assumed office 8 May 2019
- In office 28 March 2015 – 1 March 2019

Minister for Aboriginal Affairs
- In office 21 December 2021 – 28 March 2023
- Preceded by: Don Harwin
- Succeeded by: David Harris

Minister for the Arts
- In office 21 December 2021 – 28 March 2023
- Preceded by: Don Harwin
- Succeeded by: John Graham

Minister for Regional Youth
- In office 21 December 2021 – 28 March 2023
- Preceded by: Bronnie Taylor
- Succeeded by: Position abolished

Minister for Tourism
- In office 5 August 2022 – 28 March 2023
- Preceded by: Stuart Ayres (Tourism and Sport)
- Succeeded by: John Graham

Personal details
- Born: 1972 or 1973 (age 53–54)
- Party: National
- Other political affiliations: Liberal (until c. 2008)
- Education: University of Sydney

Benjamin Cameron Franklin (born 1972/1973) is an Australian politician. He served as a member of the New South Wales Legislative Council from March 2015 until March 2019, representing the National Party. He resigned in 2019 to contest the Legislative Assembly seat of Ballina, but was defeated by the incumbent Greens MP Tamara Smith. In May 2019, he was appointed to fill the casual vacancy caused by his own resignation. Franklin served as the Minister for Aboriginal Affairs, the Minister for the Arts, and the Minister for Regional Youth in the second Perrottet ministry from December 2021 to March 2023.

Prior to his election, Franklin served as the State Director of the Nationals between 2008 and 2015.

== Early life ==
The child of two school teachers, Franklin grew up in Barham and Coal Point before being awarded an academic scholarship to study at Cranbrook School in Sydney. Franklin's great-great uncle was Banjo Paterson.

Franklin studied a BA at the University of Sydney and resided at St Paul's College during his studies.

He is a former member of the Liberal Party and President of the NSW Young Liberals (2001–2002).

== Career ==
Franklin was the Communications Director for UNICEF Australia before being appointed State Director of the Nationals in 2008, where he served until his election to the NSW Legislative Council in March 2015. Preselected to the leading position on the Nationals ticket while a resident of Kirribilli in Sydney's lower north shore, Franklin vowed to move to the NSW North Coast upon his election. He currently lives in Byron Bay.

In January 2017, Franklin was appointed Parliamentary Secretary for Renewable Energy and Northern NSW. In December 2021, Franklin was appointed as the Minister for Aboriginal Affairs, the Minister for the Arts, and the Minister for Regional Youth. Following Stuart Ayres' resignation, Franklin assumed the portfolio of Minister for Tourism.

In the aftermath of the 2023 New South Wales state election, Franklin controversially decided to run for President of the Legislative Council, which would mean that the Nationals would have one fewer seat on the floor of the chamber. Adding to the controversy was Franklin's personal friendship with NSW Premier Chris Minns, despite political differences. Amid the tensions, Paul Toole lost his leadership role to Dugald Saunders. Franklin was subsequently elected as President.

Political offices
| Preceded by Bronnie Taylor as Minister for Mental Health, Regional Youth and Women | Minister for Regional Youth; 2021–2023 | Position abolished |
| Preceded by Don Harwin as Minister for the Public Service and Employee Relations, Aboriginal Affairs, and the Arts | Minister for Aboriginal Affairs; 2021–2023 | Succeeded by David Harris |
| Preceded by Don Harwin as Minister for the Public Service and Employee Relations, Aboriginal Affairs, and the Arts | Minister for the Arts; 2021–2023 | Succeeded by John Graham |
| Preceded by Stuart Ayres as Minister for Tourism and Sport | Minister for Tourism; 2022–2023 | Succeeded by John Graham |
