= Greiner–Murray ministry (1988–1991) =

Former government of New South Wales

First Greiner–Murray ministry
- 80th Cabinet of Government of New South Wales

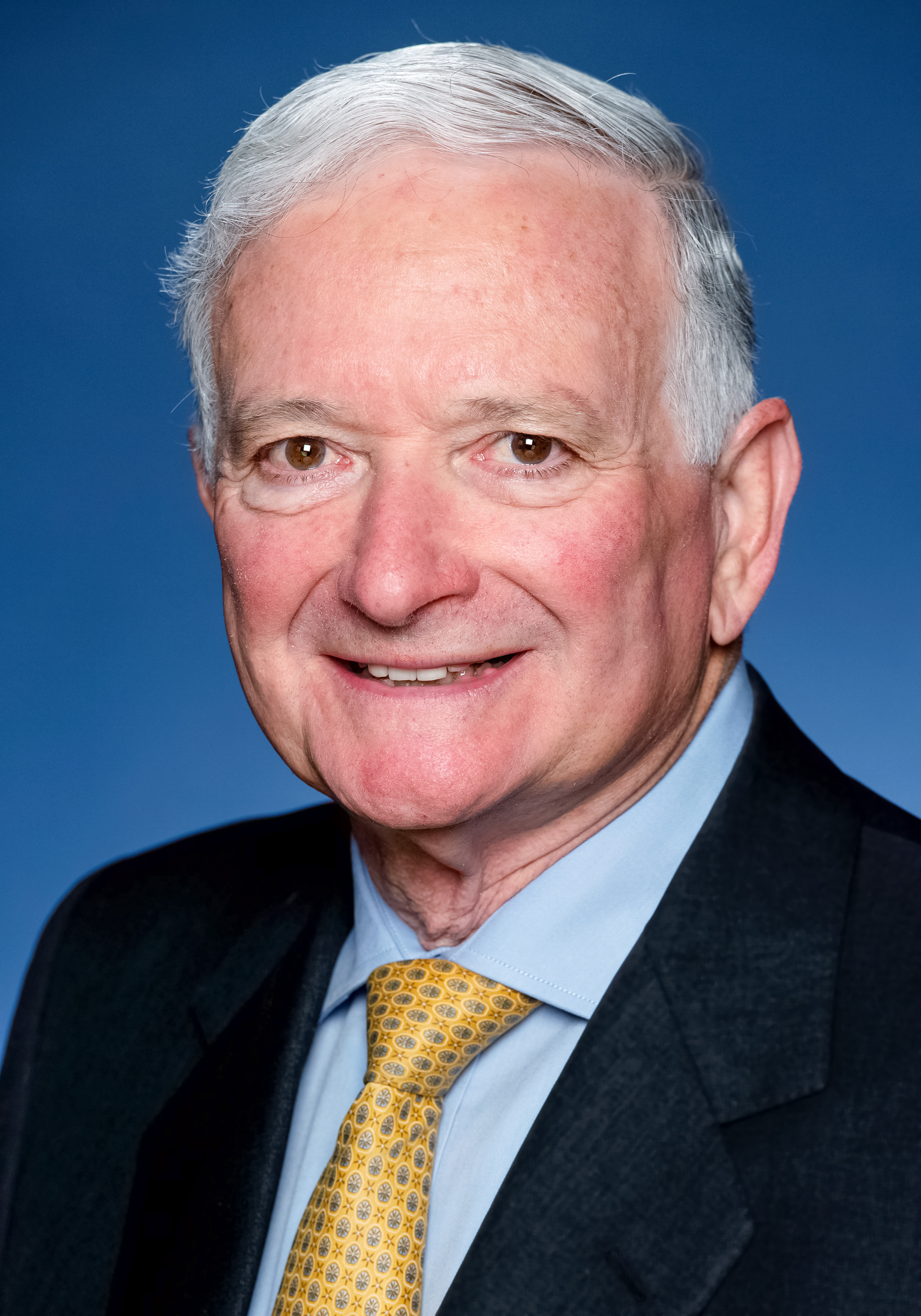
- Premier Nick Greiner
- Date formed: 21 March 1988
- Date dissolved: 6 June 1991

People and organisations
- Monarch: Queen Elizabeth II
- Governor: Sir James Rowland (1981–1989); Sir David Martin(1989–1990); Peter Sinclair(1990–1996)
- Premier: Nick Greiner
- Deputy Premier: Wal Murray
- No. of ministers: 20
- Ministers removed: 3
- Total no. of members: 23
- Member party: Liberal–National coalition
- Status in legislature: Majority Coalition Government
- Opposition parties: Labor
- Opposition leader: Bob Carr

History
- Election: 1988 New South Wales state election
- Outgoing election: 1991 New South Wales state election
- Predecessor: Unsworth ministry ––
- Successor: Second Greiner–Murray ministry

The Greiner–Murray ministry (1988–1991) or First Greiner–Murray ministry or First Greiner ministry was the 80th ministry of the New South Wales Government, and was led by the 37th Premier of New South Wales, Nick Greiner, representing the Liberal Party in coalition with the National Party, led by Wal Murray.

The ministry covers the period from 21 March 1988 when the coalition defeated the sitting Unsworth Labor government at the 1988 state election until 6 June 1991, when Greiner reconfigured his ministry following victory at the 1991 state election.

== Composition of ministry ==
The ministry was rearranged on four occasions.

- The first rearrangement was due to the sudden death of Ray Aston in May 1988. (Note: Ray Aston died in May 1988 and John Fahey replaced him in the Corrective Services portfolio. Michael Yabsley returned to parliament, elected to replace Aston as the member for Vaucluse and was immediately appointed to the portfolio.) (Note: The portfolios of Mineral Resources and Energy were combined into one portfolio Minerals and Energy.)
- The second rearrangement in January 1989 was caused by the resignation of Matt Singleton from the ministry. (Note: Matt Singleton resigned from the ministry in January 1989 and Robert Webster was appointed to the ministry to Singleton's portfolios of Administrative Services and Assistant Minister for Transport.)
- The third rearrangement was in September 1989. (Note: Tim Moore relinquished the portfolio of Assistant Minister for Transport and Bob Rowland Smith was appointed in his place. Rowland Smith's portfolio of Sport, Recreation and Racing was split into Sport and Recreation and the portfolio of Racing.)
- The fourth rearrangement in July 1990 was caused by the resignation of Terry Metherell from the ministry. (Note: Terry Metherell resigned from the ministry in July 1990. Further education and training was split from the Education portfolio and John Fahey was appointed minister. Virginia Chadwick was appointed minister for school education. Fahey's role in assisting the Premier was transferred to Bruce Baird who was also appointed to assist the Treasurer.) (Note: The new portfolio of Roads was created from Transport and Wal Murray was appointed minister, assisted by new minister Michael Yabsley.) (Note: Wal Murray relinquished the State Development and John Hannaford was appointed to the ministry and the portfolio.) (Note: Garry West and Ian Causley swapped parts of their portfolios. West gained the new portfolios of Land and Forests which were split from Causley's abolished portfolio of Natural Resources, with Causley retaining Water Resources from his former portfolio and gaining West's portfolio of Chief Secretary.) (Note: Robert Webster was appointed to the Family and Community Services portfolio, replacing Virginia Chadwick and relinquished the role of Assistant Minister for Transport.)

Portfolio	Minister	Party	Term commence	Term end	Term of office
Premier	Nick Greiner	Liberal	21 March 1988	6 June 1991	3 years, 77 days
Treasurer	Nick Greiner	Liberal	21 March 1988	6 June 1991	3 years, 77 days
Minister for Ethnic Affairs	Nick Greiner	Liberal	21 March 1988	6 June 1991	3 years, 77 days
Deputy Premier	Wal Murray	National	21 March 1988	6 June 1991	3 years, 77 days
Minister for Public Works	Wal Murray	National	21 March 1988	6 June 1991	3 years, 77 days
Minister for State Development	Wal Murray	National	21 March 1988	24 July 1990	2 years, 125 days
Minister for State Development	John Hannaford, MLC	Liberal	24 July 1990	6 June 1991	317 days
Minister for Roads	Wal Murray	National	24 July 1990	6 June 1991	317 days
Minister for Health	Peter Collins	Liberal	21 March 1988	6 June 1991	3 years, 77 days
Minister for the Arts	Peter Collins	Liberal	21 March 1988	6 June 1991	3 years, 77 days
Minister for Agriculture and Rural Affairs	Ian Armstrong	National	21 March 1988	6 June 1991	3 years, 77 days
Attorney General	John Dowd	Liberal	21 March 1988	6 June 1991	3 years, 77 days
Minister for Housing	Joe Schipp	Liberal	21 March 1988	6 June 1991	3 years, 77 days
Minister for the Environment	Tim Moore	Liberal	21 March 1988	6 June 1991	3 years, 77 days
Minister for Police and Emergency Services	Ted Pickering, MLC	Liberal	21 March 1988	6 June 1991	3 years, 77 days
Vice-President of the Executive Council; Leader of the Government in Legislative Council	Ted Pickering, MLC	Liberal	21 March 1988	6 June 1991	3 years, 77 days
Minister for Sport, Recreation and Racing	Bob Rowland Smith, MLC	National	21 March 1988	18 September 1989	1 year, 181 days
Minister for Sport and Recreation	Bob Rowland Smith, MLC	National	18 September 1989	24 May 1991	1 year, 248 days
Minister for Racing	Bob Rowland Smith, MLC	National	18 September 1989	24 May 1991	1 year, 248 days
Minister for Family and Community Services	Virginia Chadwick, MLC	Liberal	21 March 1988	24 July 1990	2 years, 125 days
Minister for Family and Community Services	Robert Webster	National	24 July 1990	6 June 1991	317 days
Minister for Education and Youth Affairs	Terry Metherell	Liberal	21 March 1988	20 July 1990	2 years, 121 days
Minister for School Education and Youth Affairs	Virginia Chadwick, MLC	Liberal	24 July 1990	6 June 1991	317 days
Minister for Transport	Bruce Baird	Liberal	21 March 1988	6 June 1991	3 years, 77 days
Assistant Minister for Transport	Matt Singleton	National	21 March 1988	24 January 1989	309 days
Assistant Minister for Transport	Tim Moore	Liberal	21 March 1988	18 September 1989	1 year, 181 days
Assistant Minister for Transport	Robert Webster	National	24 January 1989	24 July 1990	1 year, 181 days
Assistant Minister for Transport	Bob Rowland Smith, MLC	National	18 September 1989	24 May 1991	1 year, 248 days
Minister for Administrative Services	Matt Singleton	National	21 March 1988	24 January 1989	309 days
Minister for Administrative Services	Robert Webster	National	24 January 1989	24 July 1990	1 year, 181 days
Minister for Business and Consumer Affairs	Gerry Peacocke	National	21 March 1988	6 June 1991	3 years, 77 days
Minister for Mineral Resources	Neil Pickard	Liberal	21 March 1988	19 October 1988	212 days
Minister for Energy	Neil Pickard	Liberal	21 March 1988	19 October 1988	212 days
Minister for Minerals and Energy	Neil Pickard	Liberal	19 October 1988	6 June 1991	2 years, 230 days
Minister for Industrial Relations and Employment	John Fahey	Liberal	21 March 1988	24 July 1990	2 years, 125 days
Minister for Industrial Relations	John Fahey	Liberal	24 July 1990	6 June 1991	317 days
Minister for Further Education, Training and Employment	John Fahey	Liberal	24 July 1990	6 June 1991	317 days
Minister Assisting the Premier	John Fahey	Liberal	21 March 1988	24 July 1990	2 years, 125 days
Minister Assisting the Premier	Bruce Baird	Liberal	24 July 1990	6 June 1991	317 days
Minister Assisting the Treasurer	Bruce Baird	Liberal	24 July 1990	6 June 1991	317 days
Minister for Natural Resources	Ian Causley	National	21 March 1988	24 July 1990	2 years, 125 days
Minister for Water Resources	Ian Causley	National	24 July 1990	6 June 1991	317 days
Minister for Lands and Forests	Garry West	National	24 July 1990	6 June 1991	317 days
Chief Secretary	Garry West	National	21 March 1988	24 July 1990	2 years, 125 days
Chief Secretary	Ian Causley	National	24 July 1990	6 June 1991	317 days
Minister for Tourism	Garry West	National	21 March 1988	6 June 1991	3 years, 77 days
Minister for Local Government	David Hay	Liberal	21 March 1988	6 June 1991	3 years, 77 days
Minister for Planning	David Hay	Liberal	21 March 1988	6 June 1991	3 years, 77 days
Minister for Corrective Services	Ray Aston	Liberal	21 March 1988	23 May 1988	63 days
Minister for Corrective Services	John Fahey	Liberal	23 May 1988	8 June 1988	16 days
Minister for Corrective Services	Michael Yabsley	Liberal	8 June 1988	6 June 1991	2 years, 363 days
Assistant Minister for Roads	Michael Yabsley	Liberal	24 July 1990	6 June 1991	317 days

Ministers are members of the Legislative Assembly unless otherwise noted.

== See also ==
- Members of the New South Wales Legislative Assembly, 1988–1991
- Members of the New South Wales Legislative Council, 1988–1991

== Notes ==
Preceded by Unsworth ministry	First Greiner–Murray ministry 1988–1991	Succeeded by Second Greiner–Murray ministry (1991–1992)
