= Greiner–Murray ministry (1991–92) =

Second Greiner–Murray ministry
- 81st Cabinet of Government of New South Wales

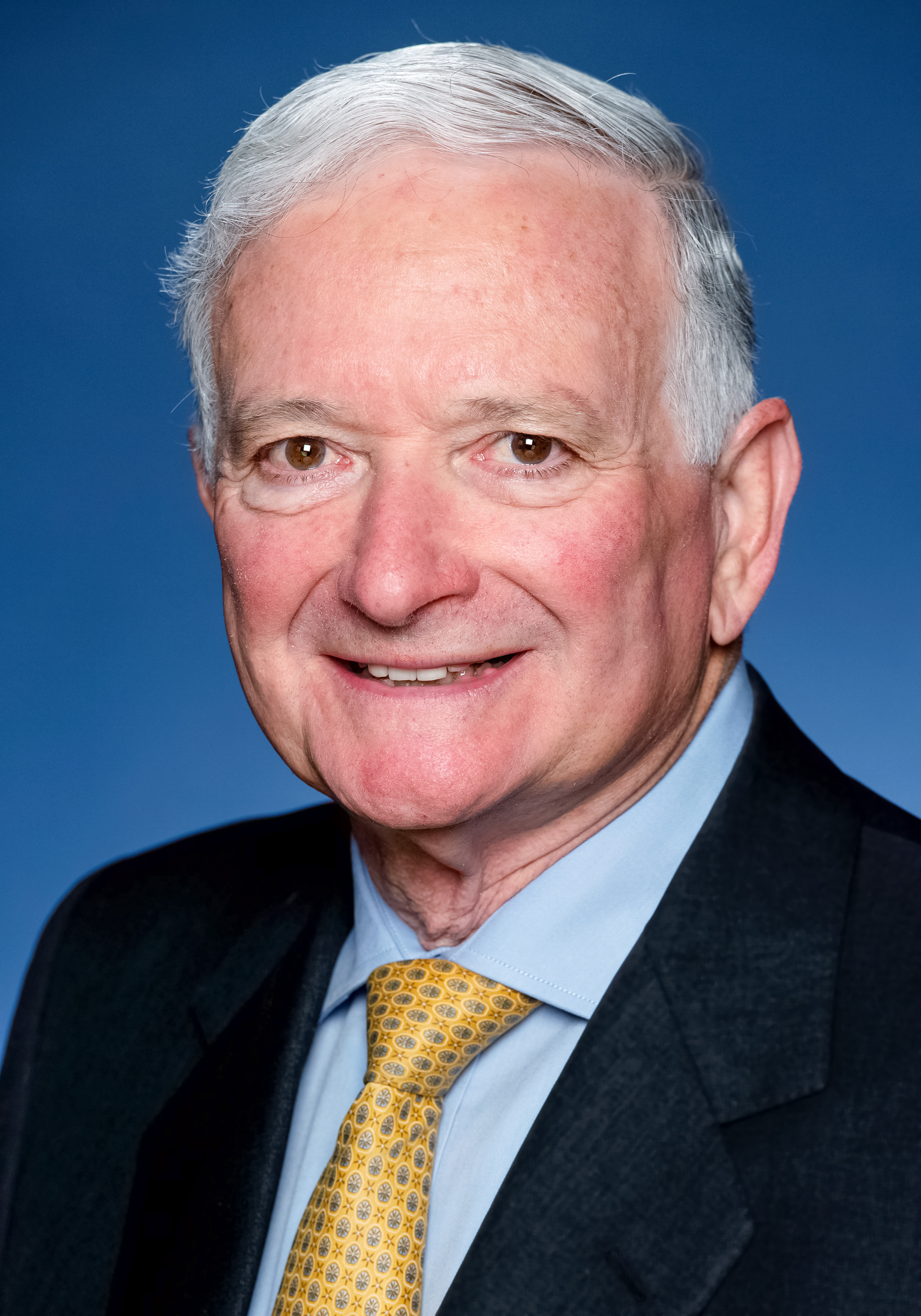
- Premier Nick Greiner
- Date formed: 6 June 1991
- Date dissolved: 24 June 1992

People and organisations
- Monarch: Queen Elizabeth II
- Governor: Peter Sinclair
- Premier: Nick Greiner
- Deputy Premier: Wal Murray
- No. of ministers: 20
- Member party: Liberal–National coalition
- Status in legislature: Minority coalition government
- Opposition parties: Labor
- Opposition leader: Bob Carr

History
- Election: 1991 New South Wales state election
- Predecessor: First Greiner–Murray ministry
- Successor: First Fahey ministry

The Greiner–Murray ministry (1991–92) or Second Greiner–Murray ministry or Second Greiner ministry was the 81st ministry of the New South Wales Government, and was led by the 37th Premier of New South Wales, Nick Greiner, representing the Liberal Party in coalition with the National Party, led by Wal Murray.

Buoyed by his government's strong performance in the polls, Greiner called a snap election for 25 May 1991. Despite widespread predictions by political and media commentators that Greiner would be easily re-elected to a second term, the impact of the Government's policies, particularly in terms of service cuts and increased charges, caused many voters to turn to Labor. The 1991 state election saw the Coalition win 52 percent of the two-party vote. However, much of the Coalition's margin was in its heartland, while Labor won many marginal seats it had lost in its severe defeat of three years prior. The result was a hung Parliament, with the Coalition one seat short of a majority. Greiner was forced into a minority government, relying on support from four independent politicians. Greiner's parliamentary majority was further eroded with the decision of Terry Metherell to become an independent in late 1991, and with the loss of The Entrance in a 1992 by-election following a Court of Disputed Returns overthrowing the original result.

The ministry covers the period from 6 June 1991 when the coalition was re-elected following victory at the 1991 state election until 24 June 1992, when Greiner resigned from the ministry. Greiner decided to resign ahead of a planned no confidence motion in his actions that enticed Metherell to resign from his relatively safe Liberal seat by offering him an executive position in a government agency. An Independent Commission Against Corruption (ICAC) inquiry found that Greiner had not acted criminally and had not set out to be corrupt, he would be seen "by a notional jury as conducting himself contrary to known and recognised standards of honesty and integrity". Despite beginning proceedings before the New South Wales Court of Appeal, Greiner resigned on 24 June in the face of a warning from a group of independent politicians who told Greiner that unless he resigned, they would withdraw their support from the government and support the no-confidence motion. Greiner was successful in his appeal before the NSW Court of Appeal, which in a 2-1 decision on 21 August 1992 overturned the ICAC findings.

Greiner was succeeded by John Fahey.

== Composition of ministry ==
| Portfolio | Minister | Party | Term commence | Term end | Term of office |
|---|---|---|---|---|---|
| Premier | Nick Greiner (Note: Retained portfolios from the first Greiner ministry.) | Liberal | 6 June 1991 | 24 June 1992 | 1 year, 18 days |
| Treasurer | Nick Greiner | Liberal | 6 June 1991 | 24 June 1992 | 1 year, 18 days |
| Minister for Ethnic Affairs | Nick Greiner | Liberal | 6 June 1991 | 24 June 1992 | 1 year, 18 days |
| Deputy Premier | Wal Murray | National | 6 June 1991 | 24 June 1992 | 1 year, 18 days |
| Minister for Public Works | Wal Murray | National | 6 June 1991 | 24 June 1992 | 1 year, 18 days |
| Minister for Roads | Wal Murray | National | 6 June 1991 | 24 June 1992 | 1 year, 18 days |
| Attorney General | Peter Collins | Liberal | 6 June 1991 | 24 June 1992 | 1 year, 18 days |
| Minister for Consumer Affairs | Peter Collins | Liberal | 6 June 1991 | 24 June 1992 | 1 year, 18 days |
| Minister for the Arts | Peter Collins | Liberal | 6 June 1991 | 24 June 1992 | 1 year, 18 days |
| Minister for Agriculture and Rural Affairs | Ian Armstrong | National | 6 June 1991 | 24 June 1992 | 1 year, 18 days |
| Minister for Housing | Joe Schipp | Liberal | 6 June 1991 | 24 June 1992 | 1 year, 18 days |
| Minister for the Environment | Tim Moore | Liberal | 6 June 1991 | 24 June 1992 | 1 year, 18 days |
| Minister for Conservation and Land Management | Garry West | National | 6 June 1991 | 24 June 1992 | 1 year, 18 days |
| Minister for Police and Emergency Services | Ted Pickering, MLC | Liberal | 6 June 1991 | 24 June 1992 | 1 year, 18 days |
| Vice-President of the Executive Council; Leader of the Government in Legislative Council | Ted Pickering, MLC | Liberal | 6 June 1991 | 24 June 1992 | 1 year, 18 days |
| Minister for School Education and Youth Affairs | Virginia Chadwick, MLC | Liberal | 6 June 1991 | 24 June 1992 | 1 year, 18 days |
| Minister for Transport | Bruce Baird | Liberal | 6 June 1991 | 24 June 1992 | 1 year, 18 days |
| Minister for Local Government | Gerry Peacocke | National | 6 June 1991 | 24 June 1992 | 1 year, 18 days |
| Minister for Cooperatives | Gerry Peacocke | National | 6 June 1991 | 24 June 1992 | 1 year, 18 days |
| Minister for Industrial Relations | John Fahey | Liberal | 6 June 1991 | 24 June 1992 | 1 year, 18 days |
| Minister for Further Education, Training and Employment | John Fahey | Liberal | 6 June 1991 | 24 June 1992 | 1 year, 18 days |
| Minister for Natural Resources | Ian Causley | National | 6 June 1991 | 24 June 1992 | 1 year, 18 days |
| Minister for State Development | Michael Yabsley | Liberal | 6 June 1991 | 24 June 1992 | 1 year, 18 days |
| Minister for Tourism | Michael Yabsley | Liberal | 6 June 1991 | 24 June 1992 | 1 year, 18 days |
| Minister for Planning | Robert Webster, MLC | National | 6 June 1991 | 24 June 1992 | 1 year, 18 days |
| Minister for Energy | Robert Webster, MLC | National | 6 June 1991 | 24 June 1992 | 1 year, 18 days |
| Minister for Health and Community Services | John Hannaford, MLC | Liberal | 6 June 1991 | 24 June 1992 | 1 year, 18 days |
| Minister for Hospital Management (Note: Portfolio name changed from Hospital Management to Health Services Management. Ron Phillips retained ministerial responsibility.) | Ron Phillips | Liberal | 6 June 1991 | 26 June 1991 | 20 days |
| Minister for Health Services Management | Ron Phillips | Liberal | 26 June 1991 | 24 June 1992 | 364 days |
| Minister for Courts Administration and Corrective Services (Note: Portfolio name changed from Courts Administration and Corrective Services to Justice. Terry Griffiths retained ministerial responsibility.) | Terry Griffiths | Liberal | 6 June 1991 | 28 June 1991 | 22 days |
| Minister for Justice | Terry Griffiths | Liberal | 28 June 1991 | 24 June 1992 | 362 days |
| Minister for Sport, Recreation and Racing | George Souris | National | 6 June 1991 | 24 June 1992 | 1 year, 18 days |
| Minister Assisting the Premier | George Souris | National | 6 June 1991 | 24 June 1992 | 1 year, 18 days |
| Chief Secretary | Anne Cohen | Liberal | 6 June 1991 | 24 June 1992 | 1 year, 18 days |
| Minister for Administrative Services | Anne Cohen | Liberal | 6 June 1991 | 24 June 1992 | 1 year, 18 days |

Ministers are members of the Legislative Assembly unless otherwise noted.

== See also ==
- Members of the New South Wales Legislative Assembly, 1991–1995
- Members of the New South Wales Legislative Council, 1991–1995

== Notes ==
New South Wales government ministries
| Preceded by First Greiner–Murray ministry (1988–1991) | Second Greiner–Murray ministry 1991–1992 | Succeeded by First Fahey–Murray ministry (1992) |
