= Anthony Roberts =

New South Wales politician

The Honourable Anthony Roberts MP

Member of the New South Wales Parliament for Lane Cove
- Incumbent
- Assumed office 22 March 2003
- Preceded by: Kerry Chikarovski
Ministerial offices 2011–2023
Minister for Planning
In office 21 December 2021 – 28 March 2023
| Premier | Dominic Perrottet |
| Preceded by | Rob Stokes (as Minister for Planning and Public Spaces) |
| Succeeded by | Paul Scully (as Minister for Planning and Public Spaces) |
In office 30 January 2017 – 23 March 2019
| Premier | Gladys Berejiklian |
| Preceded by | Rob Stokes |
| Succeeded by | Rob Stokes (as Minister for Planning and Spaces) |
Minister for Homes
In office 21 December 2021 – 28 March 2023
| Premier | Dominic Perrottet |
| Preceded by | Melinda Pavey (as Minister for Water, Property and Housing) |
| Succeeded by | Rose Jackson (as Minister for Housing) |
Minister for Counter Terrorism and Corrections
In office 2 April 2019 – 21 December 2021
| Premier | Gladys Berejiklian; Dominic Perrottet |
| Preceded by | David Elliott |
| Succeeded by | Geoff Lee (as Minister for Corrections) |
Minister for Housing
In office 30 January 2017 – 23 March 2019
| Premier | Gladys Berejiklian |
| Preceded by | Brad Hazzard |
| Succeeded by | Melinda Pavey (as the Minister for Water, Property and Housing) |
Special Minister of State
In office 30 January 2017 – 23 March 2019
| Premier | Gladys Berejiklian |
| Preceded by | new portfolio |
| Succeeded by | Don Harwin |
In office 9 December 2013 – 2 April 2015
| Premier | Barry O'Farrell; Mike Baird |
| Preceded by | Chris Hartcher |
| Succeeded by | portfolio abolished |
Minister for Industry
In office 2 April 2015 – 30 January 2017
| Premier | Mike Baird |
| Preceded by | Troy Grant (as Minister for Trade and Investment) |
| Succeeded by | Niall Blair (as the Minister for Trade and Industry) |
Minister for Resources and Energy
In office 9 December 2013 – 23 January 2017
| Premier | Barry O'Farrell; Mike Baird |
| Preceded by | Chris Hartcher |
| Succeeded by | Don Harwin (as the Minister for Resources) |
Minister for Fair Trading
In office 3 April 2011 – 9 December 2013
| Premier | Barry O'Farrell |
| Preceded by | Virginia Judge |
| Succeeded by | Stuart Ayres |

Personal details
- Born: 19 April 1970 (age 56) Sydney, Australia
- Party: Liberal
- Education: University of Technology, Sydney

Anthony John Roberts (born 19 April 1970) is an Australian politician. Roberts is a member of the New South Wales Legislative Assembly representing Lane Cove for the Liberal Party since 2003. He is the longest-serving Member of the Legislative Assembly and so holds the honorary title of "Father of the House."

He was a senior minister in the O'Farrell, Baird, Berejiklian and Perrottet governments, serving in various portfolios including Planning, Resources and Energy. Following the Coalition's loss at the 2023 election, Roberts contested the Liberal leadership. He lost to Mark Speakman and returned to the backbench.

Before entering politics, Roberts was a director of the public relations firm Flagship Communications.

== Early life ==
Anthony Roberts attended St Ignatius Riverview where he was involved in student leadership activities on campus. Anthony Roberts was involved in student politics at University of Technology Sydney, where he was a representative on the student association and was president of the Student union. During his terms as Student Union president, he was responsible for expanding the sports faculties to UTS Rowing, UTS Olympic Soccer, and UTS Basketball at Sydney Boys High. He was also a part time staff member of the Faculty of Business. Roberts was elected to Lane Cove Council and was a councillor between 1995 and 2003, including a term as deputy mayor and two terms as mayor, between 1999 and 2000 and between 2001 and 2002. Mr Roberts was also a captain of MHP-027 the NSW Fire and Rescue community fire unit located in Riverview, and was an Australian Army Reservist who was deployed to Bougainvillea for a short period of time.

=== Political adviser ===
Between 1992 and 1996, Roberts was employed as an adviser to the Hon Dr Brian Pezzutti MP, and between 1996 and 2003, Roberts was employed as an electorate officer to then-prime minister, John Howard. In the book Jonestown: The Power and the Myth of Alan Jones, journalist Chris Masters claimed that Roberts was employed to act as a liaison between the office and Sydney radio broadcaster Alan Jones. Australian online political magazine Crikey.com gave Roberts the title, "Minister for Alan Jones".

=== Orange Grove accusations ===
After Roberts was elected to parliament in 2003, Flagship Communications acted on behalf of owners of the Orange Grove site. Then NSW Premier Bob Carr claimed in 2004 that, "there appeared to be a warm relationship between Gazcorp and Mr Roberts, evidenced by a stream of faxes and emails giving the Liberal MP questions to ask of the Labor Party about the factory outlet". On 14 September 2004, Roberts said in Parliament that he had ceased being a director of Flagship Communications prior to being elected to Parliament and had never received any payment from Flagship Communications.

== Political career ==
Roberts left Howard's office when he was elected as the Member for Lane Cove in 2003, following the retirement of Kerry Chikarovski. Roberts was re-elected in 2007, increasing his margin from 3.2 points to 12.4 points.

In May 2008, Roberts was appointed to the Shadow ministry of Barry O'Farrell as Shadow Minister for Emergency Services and Juvenile Justice. In December 2008, was moved from these portfolios and was subsequently appointed Shadow Minister for the Arts, Citizenship and Volunteering.

On 24 April 2010 Roberts was unanimously endorsed by the Liberal Party to contest the 2011 state election. He was re-elected to Lane Cove with a swing of 13.4 points and won the seat with 77.3 per cent of the two-party vote. His main opponent was Mario Tsang, representing Labor. Roberts voted against legalising abortion in 2019 in NSW https://www.abc.net.au/news/2019-08-15/two-charged-over-threatening-phone-calls-to-mps/11416430

=== Minister (2011-2023) ===
On 3 April 2011, subsequent to the state election, Roberts was appointed as the Minister for Fair Trading in the O'Farrell government. Following the resignation of Chris Hartcher from cabinet on 4 December 2013, Roberts was appointed Minister for Resources and Energy and Special Minister of State. Stuart Ayres was appointed to succeed Roberts in his Fair Trading portfolio. Following the resignation of Barry O'Farrell as Premier, and the subsequent ministerial reshuffle by Mike Baird, the new Liberal Leader, in April 2014, Roberts assumed the role of Leader of the House in the Legislative Assembly, in addition to his Ministerial responsibilities. Following the 2015 state election, Roberts was sworn in as the Minister for Industry, Resources and Energy, and retained his role as Leader of the House. In this role, Roberts was tasked with the creation of 150,000 jobs in NSW over four years, promoting industry development in NSW and leading the newly created Department of Industry, Skills and Regional Development.

Following the resignation of Mike Baird as Premier, Gladys Berejiklian was elected as Liberal leader and sworn in as Premier. The Berejiklian ministry was subsequently formed with Roberts sworn in as the Minister for Planning, the Minister for Housing, and the Special Minister of State with effect from 30 January 2017. He retained his responsibilities as the Leader of the House. In the second Berejiklian ministry, Roberts served as the Minister for Counter Terrorism and Corrections, from April 2019 through to the second rearrangement of the Perrottet ministry in December 2021. He was subsequently sworn in as the Minister for Planning and the Minister for Homes.

He was Minister for Planning and Minister for Homes in the Perrottet ministry from December 2021 until March 2023 when the Perrottet government was defeated at the 2023 New South Wales state election.

=== Shadow Ministry ===
NSW Parliamentary Record: 2026 - Shadow Minister for Police and Counter-terrorism, and Shadow Minister for Corrections : 2008 - 2011 Shadow Minister for Citizenship : 2008 - 2011 Shadow Minister for Volunteering and the Arts : 2008 Shadow Minister for Emergency Services : 2008 Shadow Minister for Juvenile Justice : 2007 - 2010 Member, Public Accounts Committee (PAC) : 2003 - 2007 Member, Committee on the Independent Commission Against Corruption : 2003 Member, Legislative Assembly Standing Ethics Committee :

New South Wales Legislative Assembly
| Preceded by Kerry Chikarovski | Member for Lane Cove; 2003–present | Incumbent |
Political offices
| Preceded by Rob Stokes as Minister for Planning and Public Spaces | Minister for Planning; 2021–2023 | Succeeded by Paul Scully as Minister for Planning and Public Spaces |
| Preceded by Melinda Pavey as Minister for Water, Property and Housing | Minister for Homes; 2021–2023 | Succeeded by Rose Jackson as Minister for Housing |
| Preceded by David Elliott | Minister for Counter Terrorism and Corrections; 2019–2021 | Succeeded by Geoff Lee as Minister for Corrections |
| Preceded by Rob Stokes | Minister for Planning; 2017–2019 | Succeeded by Rob Stokes as Minister for Planning and Public Spaces |
| Preceded by Brad Hazzard | Minister for Housing; 2017–2019 | Succeeded by Melinda Pavey as Minister for Water, Property and Housing |
| New title | Special Minister of State; 2017–2019 | Succeeded by Don Harwin |
| Preceded by Himself as Minister for Resources and Energy | Minister for Industry, Resources and Energy; 2015–2017 | Succeeded by Don Harwin as Minister for Resources |
| Preceded by Himself as Minister for Resources and Energy | Minister for Industry, Resources and Energy; 2015–2017 | Succeeded by Niall Blair as Minister for Trade and Industry |
| Preceded by Chris Hartcher | Minister for Resources and Energy; 2013–2015 | Succeeded by Himself as Minister for Industry, Resources and Energy |
| Preceded by Chris Hartcher | Special Minister of State; 2013–2015 | Succeeded by portfolio abolished |
| Preceded by Virginia Judge | Minister for Fair Trading; 2011–2013 | Succeeded by Stuart Ayres |
