= Sarah Mitchell =

Australian politician (born 1982)

The Honourable Sarah Mitchell MLC
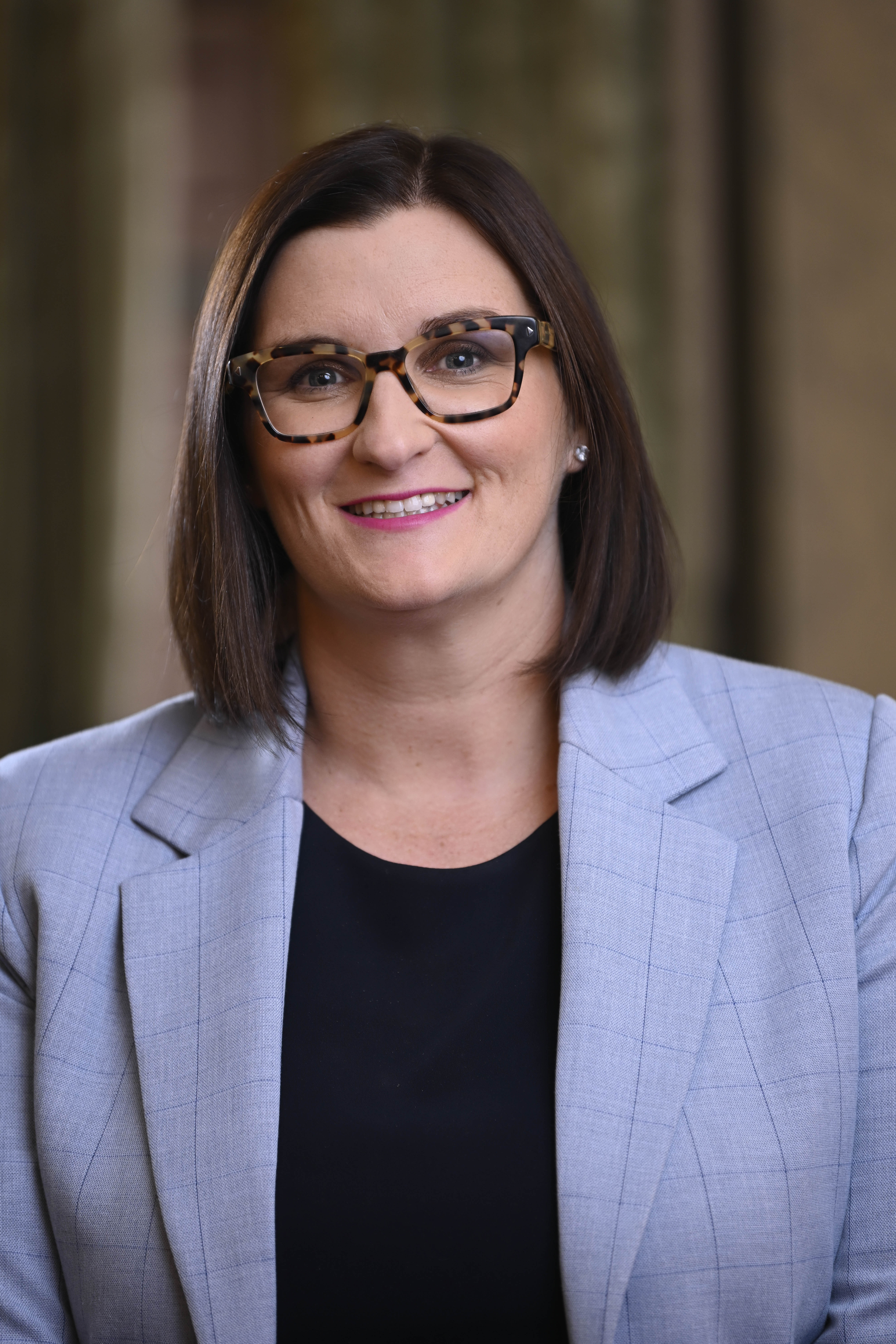

Minister for Education and Early Childhood Learning
- In office 2 April 2019 – 28 March 2023
- Premier: Gladys Berejiklian; Dominic Perrottet
- Preceded by: Rob Stokes (as the Minister for Education) herself (as the Minister for Early Childhood Education)
- Succeeded by: Prue Car

Member of the New South Wales Legislative Council
- Incumbent
- Assumed office 26 March 2011

Minister for Early Childhood Education
- In office 30 January 2017 – 23 March 2019
- Premier: Gladys Berejiklian
- Preceded by: Leslie Williams

Minister for Aboriginal Affairs
- In office 30 January 2017 – 23 March 2019
- Premier: Gladys Berejiklian
- Preceded by: Leslie Williams
- Succeeded by: Don Harwin (as the Minister for Public Services and Employee Relations, Aboriginal Affairs and the Arts)

Assistant Minister for Education
- In office 30 January 2017 – 26 March 2019
- Premier: Gladys Berejiklian
- Preceded by: Leslie Williams
- Succeeded by: portfolio abolished

Personal details
- Born: Sarah Ann Johnston; 10 May 1982 (age 44) Gunnedah, New South Wales
- Party: The Nationals
- Spouse: Anthony Mitchell
- Education: University of New South Wales

Sarah Ann Mitchell (née Johnston; born 10 May 1982), an Australian politician, is the former Minister for Education and Early Childhood Learning in the second Berejiklian ministry and in the Perrottet ministry. She has been a Nationals member of the New South Wales Legislative Council since March 2011.

Mitchell previously served as the Minister for Early Childhood Education, the Minister for Aboriginal Affairs and the Assistant Minister for Education from January 2017 until March 2019 in the first Berejiklian ministry.

== Background and early career ==
Mitchell was born in Gunnedah, and moved to Grafton as a child. She moved back to Gunnedah while in high school, completing her Higher School Certificate at Gunnedah High School in 1999. She moved to Sydney in 2001, and studied politics and international relations at the University of New South Wales, obtaining a Bachelor of Arts in 2016. Mitchell later moved back to Gunnedah, where she worked as an electorate officer for former Deputy Prime Minister John Anderson. She continued working for Mark Coulton, Anderson's successor as local MP, upon Anderson's 2007 retirement.

== Political career ==
She was later elected president of the federal Young Nationals and chairman of the state Young Nationals, positions which she held until her election to parliament. She was preselected for the eleventh position on the Coalition Legislative Council ticket for the 2011 state election in April 2010; while normally unwinnable, the near-record size of the Coalition's victory saw her emerge victorious for the last seat in an extremely close race with right-wing independent Pauline Hanson. She married Anthony Mitchell in April 2011, and took her husband's name; she had been elected two weeks before under her maiden name of Johnston.

She has served on several standing and select committees, and currently sits on the General Purpose Standing Committee No. 3. During her first years in Parliament, Sarah chaired the General Purpose Standing Committee No. 4, which undertook an inquiry into medicinal cannabis, resulting in a report unanimously in favour of the provision of medicinal cannabis for the terminally ill.

Mitchell was appointed Parliamentary Secretary for Regional and Rural Health and Western NSW on 24 April 2015. Following the resignation of Mike Baird as Premier, Gladys Berejiklian was elected as Liberal leader and sworn in as Premier. The first Berejiklian ministry was subsequently formed with Mitchell sworn in as the Minister for Early Childhood Education, the Minister for Aboriginal Affairs, and the Assistant Minister for Education with effect from 30 January 2017. Following the 2019 state election Mitchell was appointed as the Minister for Education and Early Childhood Learning in the second Berejiklian ministry, with effect from 2 April 2019. She also became the Deputy Leader of the Government in the Legislative Council.

== See also ==
- First Berejiklian ministry
- Second Berejiklian ministry
- Perrottet ministry

Political offices
Preceded by Rob Stokes as Minister for Education	Minister for Education and Early Childhood Learning; 2019–2023	Succeeded by Prue Car
Preceded by herself as Minister for Early Childhood Education	Minister for Education and Early Childhood Learning; 2019–2023	Succeeded by Prue Car
Preceded by Leslie Williams	Minister for Early Childhood Education; 2017–2019	Succeeded by herself as Minister for Education and Early Childhood Learning
Preceded by Leslie Williams	Minister for Aboriginal Affairs; 2017–2019	Succeeded by Don Harwin as Minister for Public Services and Employee Relations, Aboriginal Affairs and the Arts
Preceded by Leslie Williams	Assistant Minister for Education; 2017–2019	Succeeded by portfolio abolished
Party political offices
Preceded by Niall Blair	Deputy Leader of the Government in the Legislative Council; 2019–2023	Succeeded by John Graham
