= Berejiklian ministry (2019–2021) =

97th New South Wales government ministry led by Gladys Berejiklian

Second Berejiklian ministry
- 97th Cabinet of New South Wales

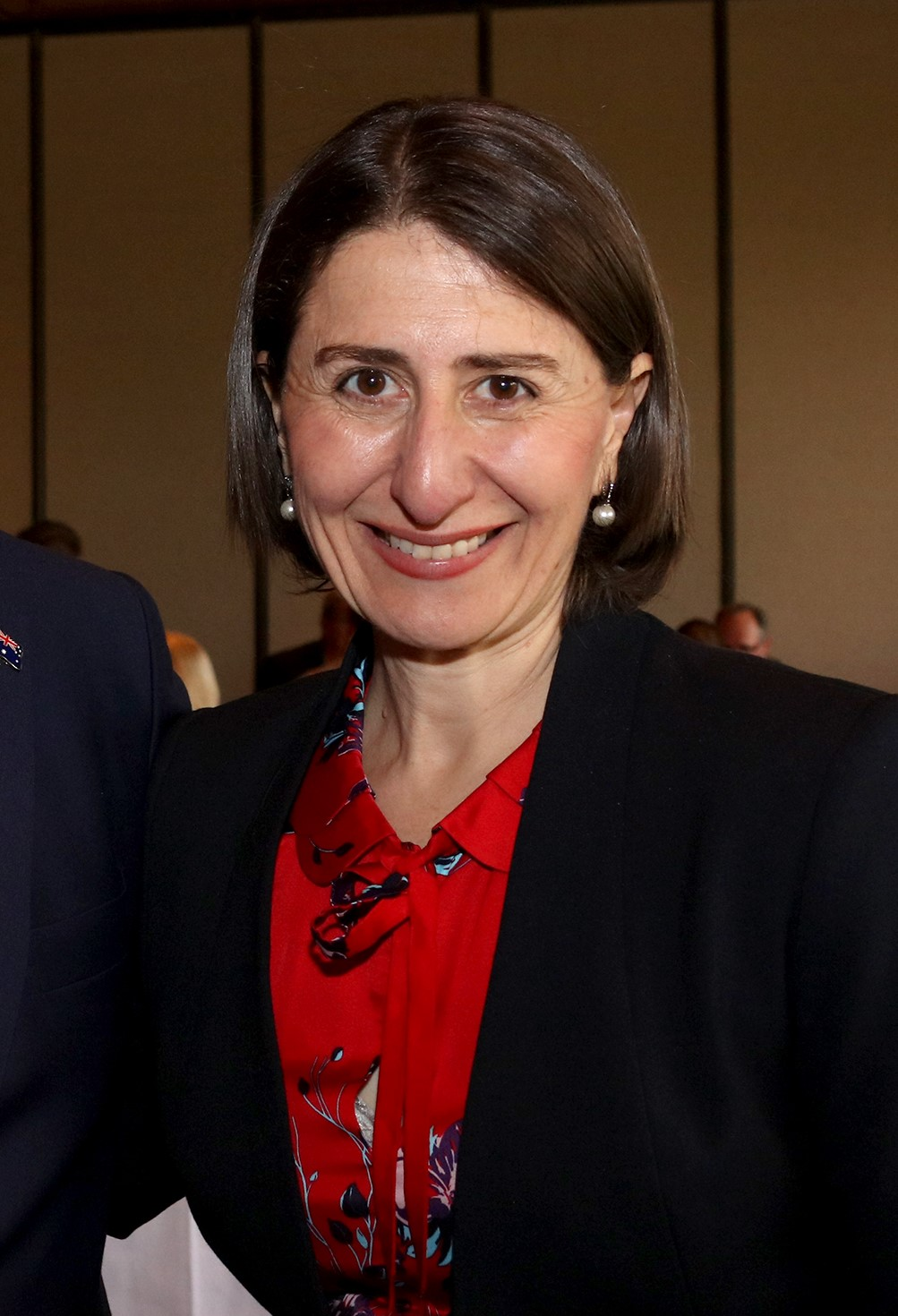
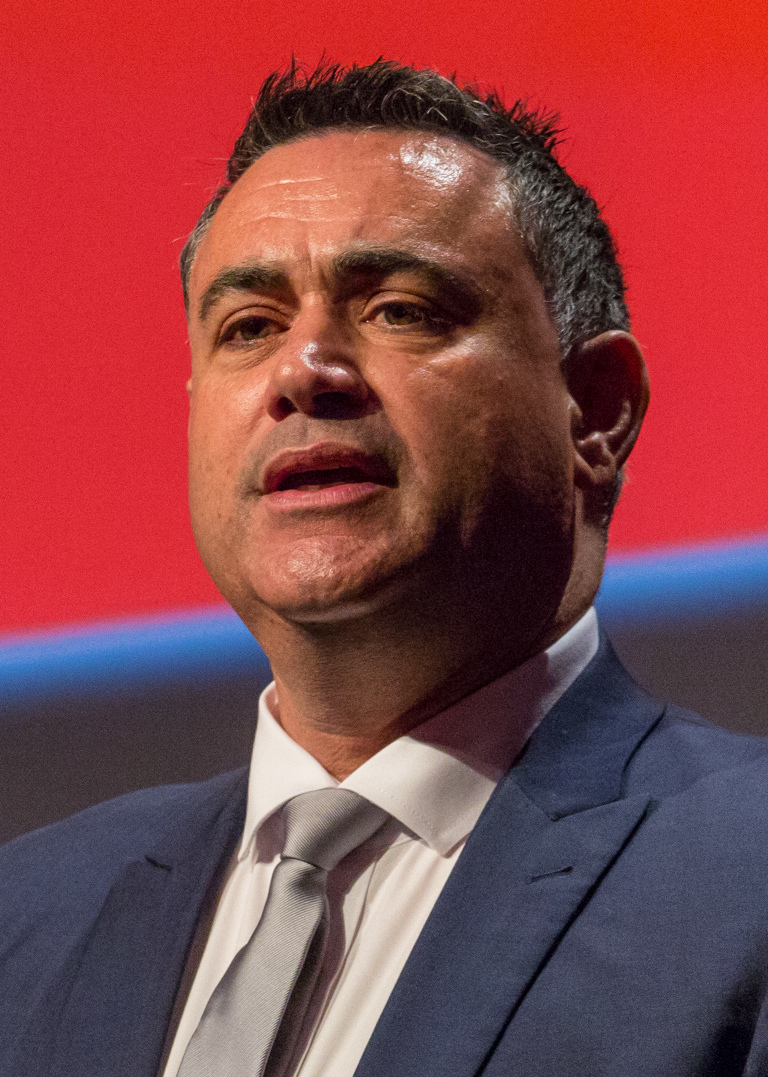
- Gladys Berejiklian John Barilaro
- Date formed: 2 April 2019
- Date dissolved: 5 October 2021

People and organisations
- Monarch: Queen Elizabeth II
- Governor: David Hurley (until 2 May 2019); Margaret Beazley (from 2 May 2019)
- Premier: Gladys Berejiklian
- Deputy Premier: John Barilaro
- Total no. of members: 24
- Member party: Liberal–National Coalition
- Status in legislature: Majority Coalition Government (until May 2021); Minority Coalition Government (May-October 2021)
- Opposition party: Labor
- Opposition leader: Jodi McKay (2019-2021) Chris Minns

History
- Election: 2019 state election
- Predecessor: First Berejiklian ministry
- Successor: First Perrottet ministry

The Second Berejiklian ministry was the 97th ministry of the Government of New South Wales, and was led by Gladys Berejiklian, the state's 45th Premier. It was the second and subsequent of two occasions that Berejiklian served as Premier.

The Liberal–National coalition ministry was formed following the 2019 state election where the Berejikilian government was re-elected. The ministry was sworn in by the Governor David Hurley on 2 April 2019. On 1 October 2021, Berejiklian announced that she would be resigning from the post as well as from the Parliament. She was replaced by treasurer Dominic Perrottet as Premier on 5 October 2021.

== Composition of ministry ==
Portfolio	Minister	Party	Term start	Term end	Term in office
Premier	Gladys Berejiklian (Note: On 10 April 2020, Don Harwin resigned as Minister for the Public Service and Employee Relations, Aboriginal Affairs, and the Arts and Leader of the Government in the Legislative Council, effective 15 April 2020, after defying the ban on non-essential travel in NSW due to the COVID-19 pandemic in Australia. Berejiklian took over as acting arts minister, and Damien Tudehope took over as Vice-President of the Executive Council and Leader of the Government in the Legislative Council. Harwin's portfolios were fully reinstated on 3 July 2020. Tudehope was then appointed as Leader of the House in the Legislative Council.)	Liberal	2 April 2019	5 October 2021	2 years, 186 days
Deputy Premier	John Barilaro	National	2 April 2019	5 October 2021	2 years, 186 days
Minister for Regional New South Wales, Industry and Trade	John Barilaro	National	2 April 2019	5 October 2021	2 years, 186 days
Treasurer	Dominic Perrottet	Liberal	2 April 2019	5 October 2021	2 years, 186 days
Minister for Regional Transport and Roads	Paul Toole	National	2 April 2019	5 October 2021	2 years, 186 days
Special Minister of State	Don Harwin MLC	Liberal	2 April 2019	5 October 2021	2 years, 186 days
Special Minister of State	Don Harwin MLC	Liberal	3 July 2020	5 October 2021	1 year, 94 days
Minister for the Public Service and Employee Relations, Aboriginal Affairs, and the Arts	Don Harwin MLC	Liberal	2 April 2019	5 October 2021	2 years, 186 days
Minister for the Public Service and Employee Relations, Aboriginal Affairs, and the Arts	Gladys Berejiklian (acting)	Liberal	15 April 2020	3 July 2020	79 days
Minister for the Public Service and Employee Relations, Aboriginal Affairs, and the Arts	Don Harwin MLC	Liberal	3 July 2020	5 October 2021	1 year, 94 days
Vice-President of the Executive Council; Leader of Government Business in the Legislative Council	Don Harwin MLC	Liberal	2 April 2019	5 October 2021	2 years, 186 days
Vice-President of the Executive Council; Leader of Government Business in the Legislative Council	Damien Tudehope MLC	Liberal	15 April 2020	3 July 2020	79 days
Vice-President of the Executive Council; Leader of Government Business in the Legislative Council	Don Harwin MLC	Liberal	3 July 2020	5 October 2021	1 year, 94 days
Minister for Transport and Roads	Andrew Constance	Liberal	2 April 2019	5 October 2021	2 years, 186 days
Minister for Health and Medical Research	Brad Hazzard	Liberal	2 April 2019	5 October 2021	2 years, 186 days
Minister for Planning and Public Spaces	Rob Stokes	Liberal	2 April 2019	5 October 2021	2 years, 186 days
Attorney General	Mark Speakman SC	Liberal	2 April 2019	5 October 2021	2 years, 186 days
Minister for the Prevention of Domestic Violence	Mark Speakman SC	Liberal	2 April 2019	27 May 2021	2 years, 55 days
Minister for Prevention of Domestic and Sexual Violence	Mark Speakman SC	Liberal	27 May 2021	5 October 2021	131 days
Minister for Customer Service	Victor Dominello	Liberal	2 April 2019	5 October 2021	2 years, 186 days
Minister for Digital	Victor Dominello	Liberal	31 March 2021	5 October 2021	188 days
Minister for Education and Early Childhood Learning	Sarah Mitchell MLC	National	2 April 2019	5 October 2021	2 years, 186 days
Minister for Police and Emergency Services	David Elliott	Liberal	2 April 2019	5 October 2021	2 years, 186 days
Minister for Water, Property and Housing	Melinda Pavey	National	2 April 2019	5 October 2021	2 years, 186 days
Minister for Jobs, Investment, Tourism and Western Sydney	Stuart Ayres	Liberal	2 April 2019	5 October 2021	2 years, 186 days
Minister for Energy and Environment	Matt Kean	Liberal	2 April 2019	5 October 2021	2 years, 186 days
Minister for Agriculture and Western New South Wales	Adam Marshall	National	2 April 2019	5 October 2021	2 years, 186 days
Minister for Counter Terrorism and Corrections	Anthony Roberts	Liberal	2 April 2019	5 October 2021	2 years, 186 days
Minister for Local Government	Shelley Hancock	Liberal	2 April 2019	5 October 2021	2 years, 186 days
Minister for Better Regulation and Innovation	Kevin Anderson	National	2 April 2019	5 October 2021	2 years, 186 days
Minister for Skills and Tertiary Education	Geoff Lee (Note: On 17 September 2019, John Sidoti stood down from his ministerial duties pending a potential investigation by the Independent Commission Against Corruption into his property dealings. Minister Geoff Lee took over as acting Minister for Sport, Multiculturalism, Seniors and Veterans. Sidoti officially resigned on 3 March 2021 and Lee continued as acting minister until May 2021.)	Liberal	2 April 2019	5 October 2021	2 years, 186 days
Minister for Sport, Multiculturalism, Seniors and Veterans	John Sidoti	Liberal	2 April 2019	3 March 2021	1 year, 335 days
Minister for Sport, Multiculturalism, Seniors and Veterans	Natalie Ward MLC (Note: On 14 May 2021, Gareth Ward resigned as minister after identifying himself as the state subject to an inquiry by the child abuse and sex crimes squad of the New South Wales Police Force. Attorney General Mark Speakman took over as acting Minister for Families, Communities and Disability Services. On 27 May 2021, it was announced that Natalie Ward and Alister Henskens were newly appointed as ministers to take over Sidoti and Gareth Ward's portfolios respectively.)	Liberal	27 May 2021	5 October 2021	131 days
Minister for Mental Health, Regional Youth and Women	Bronnie Taylor MLC	National	2 April 2019	5 October 2021	2 years, 186 days
Minister for Families, Communities and Disability Services	Gareth Ward	Liberal	2 April 2019	14 May 2021	2 years, 42 days
Minister for Families, Communities and Disability Services	Alister Henskens	Liberal	27 May 2021	5 October 2021	131 days
Minister for Finance and Small Business	Damien Tudehope MLC	Liberal	2 April 2019	5 October 2021	2 years, 186 days

Ministers are members of the Legislative Assembly unless otherwise noted.

On 10 September 2020, the Nationals announced that they were moving to the crossbench over disagreements with the Liberal Party surrounding koala habitat protection legislation. However, the Nationals still maintained ministerial portfolios. The decision was reversed the following day.

== See also ==
- Gladys Berejiklian – 45th Premier of New South Wales
- Members of the New South Wales Legislative Assembly, 2019–2023
- Members of the New South Wales Legislative Council, 2019–2023

== Notes ==
Preceded by First Berejiklian ministry	Second Berejiklian ministry 2019–2021	Succeeded by First Perrottet ministry
