= Minister for Public Sector Reform =

Government minister in New South Wales, Australia

The Minister for Public Sector Reform was a minister in the Government of New South Wales who had responsibility for administering legislation and policy in the state of New South Wales, Australia in relation to that state's public service. Ultimately the Minister was responsible to the Parliament of New South Wales.

The portfolio was combined with industrial and labour laws and regulations, Indigenous Australians, heritage and the arts as the Minister for the Public Service and Employee Relations, Aboriginal Affairs, and the Arts in the Second Berejikian ministry. The most recent dedicated Minister for the Public Service and Employee Relations, Aboriginal Affairs, and the Arts, from 3 July 2020 until 21 December 2021, was Don Harwin, who also held the additional portfolio title of Special minister of State, Up until the abolition of the portfolio, the Minister administered the portfolio through the Premier and Cabinet cluster, in particular through the Department of Premier and Cabinet, a department of the Government of New South Wales, and additional agencies including Aboriginal Affairs NSW and Create NSW.

== List of ministers ==
Title	Minister	Party	Ministry	Term start	Term end	Time in office	Notes
Minister Assisting the Premier on Public Sector Management	John Della Bosca	Labor	Carr (3)	31 March 2000	2 April 2003	3 years, 2 days	
Minister for Public Sector Reform	John Robertson	Labor	Rees; Keneally	30 January 2009	21 May 2010	1 year, 111 days	
Minister for Public Sector Reform	Paul Lynch	Labor	Keneally	21 May 2010	28 March 2011	311 days	
Minister for the Public Service and Employee Relations, Aboriginal Affairs, and the Arts	Don Harwin	Liberal	Berejiklian (2)	2 April 2019	15 April 2020	1 year, 13 days	
Minister for the Public Service and Employee Relations, Aboriginal Affairs, and the Arts	Gladys Berejiklian (acting)	Liberal	Berejiklian (2)	15 April 2020	3 July 2020	79 days	
Minister for the Public Service and Employee Relations, Aboriginal Affairs, and the Arts	Don Harwin	Liberal	Berejiklian (2)	3 July 2020	21 December 2021	1 year, 171 days	

== See also ==
- List of New South Wales government agencies
