= John Graham (Australian politician) =

Australian politician

The Honourable John Graham MLC
- Graham in 2015

Minister for Transport
- Incumbent
- Assumed office 6 February 2025
- Premier: Chris Minns
- Preceded by: Jo Haylen

Minister for the Arts, Music and the Night-time Economy
- Incumbent
- Assumed office 28 March 2023
- Premier: Chris Minns
- Preceded by: Ben Franklin

Minister for Roads
- In office 28 March 2023 – 17 March 2025
- Premier: Chris Minns
- Preceded by: Natalie Ward
- Succeeded by: Jenny Aitchison

Minister for Jobs and Tourism
- In office 5 April 2023 – 17 March 2025
- Premier: Chris Minns
- Preceded by: Ben Franklin
- Succeeded by: Steve Kamper

Deputy Leader of the Government in the Legislative Council
- Incumbent
- Assumed office 28 March 2023
- Premier: Chris Minns
- Leader: Penny Sharpe
- Preceded by: Sarah Mitchell

Special Minister of State
- Incumbent
- Assumed office 28 March 2023
- Premier: Chris Minns
- Preceded by: Don Harwin

Deputy Leader of the Opposition in the Legislative Council
- In office 8 June 2021 – 28 March 2023
- Leader: Penny Sharpe
- Succeeded by: Sarah Mitchell

Member of New South Wales Legislative Council
- Incumbent
- Assumed office 12 October 2016
- Preceded by: Sophie Cotsis

Personal details
- Party: Labor Party (1991–present)
- Spouse: Jenny McAllister
- Children: Two
- Website: www.johngraham.net.au

John Edward Graham is an Australian politician. He has been a Labor member of the New South Wales Legislative Council since October 2016 and has been Special Minister of State and Minister for Roads, the Arts, Music, the Night-time Economy, Jobs and Tourism since 2023. He has also been the Minister for Transport since 6 February 2025.

== Career ==
=== 1991–2017: Early political career and party involvement ===
Graham joined the Labor Party in 1991. He worked in the higher education sector and for the Finance Sector Union. He also worked as an adviser to NSW and Queensland state governments, including as the Deputy Chief of Staff to then-NSW Premier Nathan Rees in 2009. He is a founder of Labor Loves Live Music.

Graham became assistant general secretary of the New South Wales branch of the Australian Labor Party in the early 2010s, serving for six years.

Graham was considered for preselection for the Canterbury state by-election, and was confident he had the support of the rank-and-file members. However, Sophie Cotsis was preselected after NSW Labor leader Luke Foley intervened over concerns that Graham lived in Redfern (in the electorate of Newtown) and Foley wanted the candidate to be a woman. Graham was appointed to fill the vacancy resulting from the resignation of Cotsis to contest the by-election.

=== 2018–2023: Shadow Ministry roles and Legislative Council leadership ===
After Michael Daley replaced Foley as Leader in 2018, Graham was appointed to the shadow ministry in the role of Shadow Minister for Forestry, Gaming and Racing, Night Time Economy and Music, Tourism and Major Events.

After the 2019 election, Jodi McKay replaced Daley as Leader. Graham was appointed as Shadow Minister for Roads, Night Time Economy and Music in her frontbench. He retained these positions in the Shadow Ministry of Chris Minns when that was constituted in 2021. He was also appointed as deputy leader of the opposition in the Legislative Council and Shadow Special Minister of State at this time.

Following the resignation of Walt Secord from the frontbench in 2022, Graham added the portfolios of Arts and the North Coast to his existing Shadow Ministries.

=== 2025: Minister for Transport ===
In February 2025, Graham was appointed as NSW Transport Minister following Transport Minister Jo Haylen's resignation.

In March 2025, Graham moved into the transport portfolio full-time, his roads portfolio moved to Jenny Aitchison, and the jobs and tourism portfolio went to Steve Kamper.

In May 2026, Graham was suspended from the Legislative Council for one day.

== Personal life ==
Graham is married to federal senator Jenny McAllister. They have two children. He is a member of NSW Labor's left faction.

Political offices
Preceded by Penny Sharpe	Deputy Leader of the Opposition in the Legislative Council; 2021–2023	Succeeded by Sarah Mitchell
Preceded by Sarah Mitchell	Deputy Leader of the Government in the Legislative Council; 2023–present	Incumbent
Preceded by Ben Franklin	Minister for the Arts, Music and the Night-time Economy; 2023–present	Incumbent
Preceded by Don Harwin (2021)	Special Minister of State; 2023–present	Incumbent
Preceded by Natalie Ward	Minister for Roads; 2023–2025	Succeeded by Jenny Aitchison
