= Special Minister of State (New South Wales) =

Government minister in New South Wales, Australia

Special Minister of State of New South Wales
- Coat of arms of New South Wales

- Flag of New South Wales

- Incumbent; John Graham since 28 March 2023
- Department of Premier and Cabinet (New South Wales)
- Style: The Honourable
- Member of: Parliament; Cabinet; Executive Council
- Reports to: Premier of New South Wales
- Seat: 52 Martin Place, Sydney
- Nominator: Premier of New South Wales
- Appointer: Governor of New South Wales; on the advice of the premier
- Term length: At the governor's pleasure
- Formation: 25 March 1988
- First holder: Matt Singleton

The New South Wales Special Minister of State is a minister in the Government of New South Wales with responsibility for special administrative matters in the state of New South Wales, Australia. The portfolio was established in 1988 in first Greiner–Murray ministry as the Minister for Administrative Services, and after several reincarnations as the Special Minister of State, was abolished on 21 December 2021 when the second Perrottet ministry was established. The portfolio was reestablished in 2023 after the election of Chris Minns as Premier of New South Wales following the 2023 election.

The current Special Minister of Minister is John Graham who is also the Minister for Roads and the Night Time Economy.

The minister administers the portfolio through the Premier and Cabinet cluster, in particular through the Department of Premier and Cabinet, a department of the Government of New South Wales, and additional agencies.

Ultimately the minister is responsible to the Parliament of New South Wales.

== List of ministers ==
=== Special Minister of State ===
The following individuals served as the Special Ministers of State, or any precedent titles:

Title	Minister	Party	Ministry	Term start	Term end	Time in office	Notes
Minister for Administrative Services	Matt Singleton	National	Greiner (1)	25 March 1988	24 January 1989	305 days	
Minister for Administrative Services	Robert Webster	National	Greiner (1)	24 January 1989	6 June 1991	2 years, 133 days	
Minister for Administrative Services	Anne Cohen	Liberal	Greiner (2)	6 June 1991	4 April 1995	3 years, 302 days	
Special Minister of State	John Della Bosca	Labor	Carr (3) (4); Iemma (1)	8 April 1999	17 February 2006	6 years, 315 days	
Special Minister of State	John Robertson	Labor	Rees	30 January 2009	4 December 2009	308 days	
Special Minister of State	Eric Roozendaal	Labor	Keneally ministry	8 December 2009	28 March 2011	1 year, 116 days	
Special Minister of State	Chris Hartcher	Liberal	O'Farrell	3 April 2011	9 December 2013	2 years, 250 days	
Special Minister of State	Anthony Roberts	Liberal	O'Farrell; Baird (1)	9 December 2013	2 April 2015	1 year, 114 days	
Special Minister of State	Anthony Roberts	Liberal	Berejiklian (1)	30 January 2017	23 March 2019	2 years, 52 days	
Special Minister of State	Don Harwin	Liberal	Berejiklian (2)	2 April 2019	15 April 2020	1 year, 13 days	
Special Minister of State	Don Harwin	Liberal	Berejiklian (2); Perrottet (1)	3 July 2020	21 December 2021	1 year, 171 days	
Special Minister of State	John Graham	Labor	Minns	28 March 2023	incumbent	3 years, 235 days	

== Former ministerial titles ==
=== Federal Affairs ===
Title	Minister	Party	Ministry	Term start	Term end	Time in office	Notes
Minister for Federal Affairs	Frederick Hewitt	Liberal	Lewis (1) (2); Willis	3 January 1975	23 January 1976	1 year, 20 days	

== See also ==
- List of New South Wales government agencies
