= Minister for the Arts (New South Wales) =

- Incumbent; John Graham since 28 March 2023
- Department of Creative Industries, Tourism, Hospitality and Sport
- Style: The Honourable
- Appointer: Governor of New South Wales
- Inaugural holder: George Freudenstein (Minister for Cultural Activities)
- Formation: 11 March 1971

The Minister for the Arts is a Minister of the Crown in the New South Wales Government who has responsibilities for the administration and support for the arts in the state of New South Wales, Australia. The portfolio was abolished in 2019 and merged into the portfolio of Minister for the Public Service and Employee Relations, Aboriginal Affairs, and the Arts; and reinstated in December 2021.

The minister administer the portfolio through Create NSW (formerly Arts NSW) within the Department of Creative Industries, Tourism, Hospitality and Sport, as well as a range of additional government agencies.

Ultimately, the minister is responsible to the Parliament of New South Wales.

== Office history ==
The role of an 'arts' minister, overseeing the management and support for all cultural activities in New South Wales, before the early 1970s was an unheard of concept in politics. However, by the early 1970s, various governments in Australia recognised the need for a steering authority for state support for the arts. In response, premier Bob Askin appointed George Freudenstein as the first Minister for Cultural Activities+ on 11 March 1971. This coincided with the appointment of the first federal minister with a responsibility for the arts on 10 March and a Minister for Cultural Affairs in Western Australia on 3 March 1971. Premier of Victoria Rupert Hamer commissioned himself with a ministry of the arts in 1972 and South Australia followed suit on 18 September 1979.

On his appointment Freudenstein requested the establishment of an organisation to enable him to carry out his responsibilities and the Premier agreed. On 13 May 1971 the "Ministry of Cultural Activities" was established, taking over responsibility for various legislation and bodies that had previously been under the purview of the Department of Education, including the Archives Office of New South Wales, Art Gallery of New South Wales, State Library of New South Wales, Australian Museum, Museum of Applied Arts and Sciences, Sydney Observatory, the Advisory Committee on Cultural Grants, NSW Film Council, and the Sydney Opera House Trust. In the case of the opera house, the Ministry had responsibility for its completion and final official opening on 20 October 1973. With Freudenstein's departure on 3 January 1975, a new Minister for Culture, Sport and Recreation was appointed and on 6 January 1975, the Ministry of Cultural Activities was replaced by the new "Department of Culture, Sport and Recreation".

This arrangement lasted until 14 May 1976 when the new Labor Government of Neville Wran transferred the responsibility for cultural activities to the Premier's Department. This became the "Cultural Activities Division" under the administration of the Premier himself. This situation continued until 1984, when Wran established the "Office of the Minister for the Arts" within the Premier's Department and commissioned himself with the title of Minister for the Arts. On 15 June 1988 a "Ministry for the Arts" independent of the Premier's Department was established. This ministry was abolished on 3 March 2006 and its responsibilities were moved to the new "Department of the Arts, Sport and Recreation". Arts NSW became the new dedicated division for the Minister and it transferred to "Communities NSW" in July 2009 and then the "Department of Trade and Investment, Regional Infrastructure and Services" from 4 April 2011. From the appointment of Troy Grant as the minister in 2014 (who also served as Minister for Justice and Police), Arts NSW came within the Justice Department.

Following the 2019 state election the portfolio responsibilities were transferred to the Premier and Cabinet cluster, with Create NSW (formerly Arts NSW) administered through the Department of Premier and Cabinet, a department of the Government of New South Wales. In December 2021, the portfolio responsibilities and Create NSW were transferred to the new Department of Enterprise, Investment and Trade.

== List of ministers ==
=== Arts ===
The following individuals have served as Minister for Arts and any precedent titles:

Ministerial title	Minister	Party	Ministry	Term start	Term end	Time in office	Notes
Minister for Cultural Activities	George Freudenstein	Country	Askin (4) (5) (6)	11 March 1971	3 January 1975	3 years, 298 days	
Minister for Culture, Sport and Recreation	John Barraclough	Liberal	Lewis (1) (2)	3 January 1975	23 January 1976	1 year, 20 days	
Minister for Culture, Sport and Recreation	David Arblaster	Liberal	Willis	23 January 1976	14 May 1976	82 days	
Minister for the Arts	Neville Wran	Labor	Wran (6) (7) (8)	10 February 1984	4 July 1986	2 years, 144 days	
Minister for the Arts	Frank Walker	Labor	Unsworth	4 July 1986	21 March 1988	1 year, 261 days	
Minister for the Arts	Peter Collins	Liberal	Greiner (1) (2); Fahey (1) (2) (3)	25 March 1988	4 April 1995	7 years, 10 days	
Minister for the Arts	Bob Carr	Labor	Carr (1) (2) (3) (4)	4 April 1995	3 August 2005	10 years, 121 days	
Minister for the Arts	Bob Debus	Labor	Iemma (1)	3 August 2005	2 March 2007	1 year, 211 days	
Minister for the Arts	Frank Sartor	Labor	Iemma (2)	2 April 2007	5 September 2008	1 year, 156 days	
Minister for the Arts	Nathan Rees	Labor	Rees	8 September 2008	4 December 2009	1 year, 87 days	
Minister for the Arts	Virginia Judge	Labor	Keneally	8 December 2009	28 March 2011	1 year, 116 days	
Minister for the Arts	George Souris	National	O'Farrell	3 April 2011	23 April 2014	3 years, 20 days	
Minister for the Arts	Troy Grant	National	Baird (1) (2)	23 April 2014	30 January 2017	2 years, 282 days	
Minister for the Arts	Don Harwin	Liberal	Berejiklian (1)	30 January 2017	23 March 2019	3 years, 76 days	
Minister for the Public Service and Employee Relations, Aboriginal Affairs, and the Arts	Don Harwin	Liberal	Berejiklian (2)	2 April 2019	15 April 2020	3 years, 76 days	
Minister for the Public Service and Employee Relations, Aboriginal Affairs, and the Arts	Gladys Berejiklian (acting)	Liberal	Berejiklian (2)	15 April 2020	3 July 2020	79 days	
Minister for the Public Service and Employee Relations, Aboriginal Affairs, and the Arts	Don Harwin	Liberal	Berejiklian (2); Perrottet (1)	3 July 2020	21 December 2021	1 year, 171 days	
Minister for the Arts	Ben Franklin	National	Perrottet (2)	21 December 2021	28 March 2023	1 year, 97 days	
Minister for the Arts	John Graham	Labor	Minns	28 March 2023	incumbent	3 years, 235 days	

=== Music and the Night-time Economy ===
Ministerial title	Minister	Party	Ministry	Term start	Term end	Time in office	Notes
Minister for Music and the Night-time Economy	John Graham	Labor	Minns	28 March 2023	incumbent	3 years, 227 days	

== Assistant Ministers ==
Ministerial title	Minister	Party	Ministry	Term start	Term end	Time in office	Notes
Minister Assisting the Premier on the Arts	Bob Debus	Labor	Carr (1) (2) (3)	13 March 1996	2 April 2003	7 years, 20 days	
Minister Assisting the Premier on the Arts	Frank Sartor	Labor	Carr (4)	2 April 2003	3 August 2005	2 years, 123 days	
Minister Assisting the Premier on the Arts	Virginia Judge	Labor	Rees	8 September 2008	4 December 2009	1 year, 87 days	

== See also ==
- List of New South Wales government agencies
