= Minister for Natural Resources =

Former government minister in the state of New South Wales

Minister for Natural Resources of New South Wales
- Incumbent; Courtney Houssos since 5 April 2023
- Appointer: Governor of New South Wales
- Formation: 5 April 1984
- First holder: Janice Crosio

The Minister for Natural Resources is a ministry in New South Wales responsible for land, waterways, reserves and parks and forestry. It was first established in 1984 but has been abolished for several intermittent periods since then. It was most recently reestablished in 2023.

The minister is responsible for the former portfolios of Mines. It was abolished in 2007 and replaced with the portfolio of Climate Change, Environment and Water. It was re-created in the first Baird ministry, and was abolished in the Second Baird ministry, replaced by the portfolio of Lands and Water.

== List of ministers for natural resources ==
Title	Minister	Party	Term start	Term end	Time in office	Notes
Minister for Natural Resources	Janice Crosio	Labor	5 April 1984	6 February 1986	1 year, 307 days	
Minister for Natural Resources	John Aquilina	Labor	6 February 1986	4 July 1986	148 days	
Minister for Natural Resources; Minister for Water Resources	Ian Causley	National	25 March 1988	24 July 1990	2 years, 121 days	
Minister for Natural Resources	Ian Causley	National	6 June 1991	26 May 1993	1 year, 354 days	
Minister for Natural Resources	Craig Knowles	Labor	2 April 2003	3 August 2005	2 years, 123 days	
Minister for Natural Resources	Ian Macdonald	Labor	3 August 2005	2 April 2007	1 year, 242 days	
Minister for Natural Resources, Lands and Water	Kevin Humphries	National	23 April 2014	2 April 2015	344 days	
Minister for Industry, Resources and Energy	Anthony Roberts	Liberal	2 April 2015	30 January 2017	3 years, 57 days	
Minister for Resources	Don Harwin	Liberal	30 January 2017	2 April 2019	2 years, 62 days	
Minister for Natural Resources	Courtney Houssos	Labor	5 April 2023	incumbent	3 years, 155 days	

=== Assistant ministers ===
Title	Minister	Party	Term start	Term end	Time in office	Notes
Minister Assisting the Minister for Natural Resources (Forests)	Michael Costa	Labor	2 April 2003	1 July 2004	1 year, 90 days	
Minister Assisting the Minister for Natural Resources (Lands)	Tony Kelly	Labor	2 April 2003	3 May 2004	1 year, 31 days	
Minister Assisting the Minister for Natural Resources	Tony Kelly	Labor	15 June 2005	3 August 2005	49 days	

== Former ministerial titles ==
=== Mines ===
Title	Minister	Party	Term start	Term end	Time in office	Notes
Secretary for Lands and Secretary for Mines	James Farnell	No party	9 May 1874	26 July 1874	78 days	
Secretary for Mines	Robert Abbott	No party	27 July 1874	8 February 1875	196 days	
Secretary for Mines	John Lucas	No party	9 February 1875	5 February 1877	1 year, 362 days	
Secretary for Mines	George Lloyd	No party	6 February 1877	16 August 1877	191 days	
Secretary for Mines	Ezekiel Baker	No party	17 August 1877	19 November 1877	94 days	
Secretary for Mines	Archibald Jacob	No party	20 November 1877	17 December 1877	27 days	
Secretary for Mines	William Suttor Jr.	No party	18 December 1877	20 December 1878	1 year, 2 days	
Secretary for Mines	Ezekiel Baker	No party	21 December 1878	11 October 1881	2 years, 294 days	
Secretary for Mines	Arthur Renwick	No party	12 October 1881	4 January 1883	1 year, 84 days	
Secretary for Mines	Joseph Abbott	No party	5 January 1883	6 October 1885	2 years, 274 days	
Secretary for Mines	Francis Wright	No party	7 October 1885	17 October 1885	10 days	
Secretary for Mines	George Thornton	No party	13 November 1885	21 December 1885	38 days	
Secretary for Mines	Robert Vaughn	No party	22 December 1885	25 February 1886	65 days	
Secretary for Mines	James Fletcher	No party	26 February 1886	23 December 1886	300 days	
Secretary for Mines	Charles Mackellar	No party	24 December 1886	19 January 1887	26 days	
Secretary for Mines	Francis Abigail	Free Trade	20 January 1887	16 January 1889	1 year, 362 days	
Secretary for Mines	John Chanter	Protectionist	17 January 1889	7 March 1889	49 days	
Secretary for Mines	Sydney Smith	Free Trade	8 March 1889	27 February 1890	2 years, 228 days	
Secretary for Mines and Agriculture	Sydney Smith	Free Trade	28 February 1890	22 October 1891	2 years, 228 days	
Secretary for Mines and Agriculture	Thomas Slattery	Protectionist	23 October 1891	2 August 1894	2 years, 283 days	
Secretary for Mines and Agriculture	Sydney Smith	Free Trade	3 August 1894	15 August 1898	4 years, 12 days	
Secretary for Mines and Agriculture	Joseph Cook	Free Trade	27 August 1898	13 September 1899	1 year, 17 days	
Secretary for Mines and Agriculture	John Fegan	Protectionist	15 September 1899	8 April 1901	1 year, 205 days	
Secretary for Mines and Agriculture	John Kidd	Progressive	10 April 1901	29 August 1904	3 years, 141 days	
Secretary for Mines and Agriculture	Samuel Moore	Liberal Reform	29 August 1904	1 October 1907	3 years, 33 days	
Secretary for Mines and Agriculture	John Perry	Liberal Reform	2 October 1907	21 January 1908	111 days	
Secretary for Mines	William Wood	Liberal Reform	22 January 1908	20 October 1910	2 years, 271 days	
Secretary for Mines	Alfred Edden	Labor	21 October 1910	29 January 1914	3 years, 100 days	
Secretary for Mines	John Cann	Labor	29 January 1914	15 March 1915	1 year, 45 days	
Secretary for Mines	John Estell	Labor	15 March 1915	31 October 1916	1 year, 230 days	
Secretary for Mines	Henry Hoyle	Labor	31 October 1916	15 November 1916	15 days	
Secretary for Mines	John Fitzpatrick	Nationalist	15 November 1916	12 April 1920	3 years, 149 days	
Secretary for Mines	George Cann	Labor	12 April 1920	20 December 1921	1 year, 252 days	
Secretary for Mines	John Fitzpatrick	Nationalist	20 December 1921	20 December 1921	7 hours	
Secretary for Mines	George Cann	Labor	20 December 1921	13 April 1922	113 days	
Secretary for Mines	John Fitzpatrick	Nationalist	13 April 1922	17 June 1925	3 years, 65 days	
Secretary for Mines	Jack Baddeley	Labor	17 June 1925	18 October 1927	2 years, 123 days	
Secretary for Mines	Frank Chaffey	Nationalist	18 October 1927	15 April 1929	1 year, 179 days	
Secretary for Mines	Reginald Weaver	Nationalist	16 April 1929	3 November 1930	1 year, 202 days	
Secretary for Mines	Jack Baddeley	Labor	4 November 1930	15 October 1931	1 year, 191 days	
Secretary for Mines	Jack Baddeley	Labor (NSW)	15 October 1931	13 May 1932	1 year, 191 days	
Secretary for Mines	Frank Chaffey	United Australia	16 May 1932	17 June 1932	32 days	
Secretary for Mines	Roy Vincent	Country	18 June 1932	16 May 1941	8 years, 332 days	
Secretary for Mines	Jack Baddeley	Labor	16 May 1941	8 September 1949	8 years, 115 days	
Secretary for Mines	James McGirr	Labor	8 September 1949	21 September 1949	13 days	
Secretary for Mines	William Dickson	Labor	21 September 1949	30 June 1950	282 days	
Secretary for Mines	Joshua Arthur	Labor	30 June 1950	23 February 1953	2 years, 238 days	
Secretary for Mines	Bob Heffron	Labor	23 February 1953	16 September 1953	205 days	
Secretary for Mines	Francis Buckley	Labor	16 September 1953	30 June 1954	2 years, 88 days	
Secretary for Mines	William Gollan	Labor	1 July 1954	15 March 1956	1 year, 259 days	
Secretary for Mines	Roger Nott	Labor	15 March 1956	14 November 1957	1 year, 244 days	
Secretary for Mines	Jim Simpson	Labor	14 November 1957	1 April 1959	7 years, 180 days	
Minister for Mines	Jim Simpson	Labor	1 April 1959	13 May 1965	7 years, 180 days	
Minister for Mines	Tom Lewis	Liberal	13 May 1965	27 June 1967	2 years, 45 days	
Minister for Mines	Wal Fife	Liberal	27 June 1967	3 January 1975	7 years, 190 days	
Minister for Mines	George Freudenstein	Country	3 January 1975	14 May 1976	1 year, 131 days	
Minister for Mines	Pat Hills	Labor	14 May 1976	19 October 1978	2 years, 158 days	
Minister for Mineral Resources and Development	Ron Mulock	Labor	19 October 1978	29 February 1980	2 years, 348 days	
Minister for Mineral Resources	Ron Mulock	Labor	29 February 1980	2 October 1981	2 years, 348 days	
Minister for Mineral Resources	Neville Wran	Labor	2 October 1981	1 February 1983	1 year, 122 days	
Minister for Mineral Resources	Kevin Stewart	Labor	1 February 1983	10 February 1984	1 year, 9 days	
Minister for Mineral Resources	Don Day	Labor	10 February 1984	5 April 1984	55 days	
Minister for Mineral Resources and Energy	Peter Cox	Labor	5 April 1984	6 February 1986	1 year, 307 days	
Minister for Mineral Resources	Ken Gabb	Labor	4 July 1986	26 November 1987	2 years, 44 days	
Minister for Minerals and Energy	Ken Gabb	Labor	26 November 1987	21 March 1988	2 years, 44 days	
Minister for Mineral Resources	Neil Pickard	Liberal	21 March 1988	19 October 1988	3 years, 73 days	
Minister for Minerals and Energy	Neil Pickard	Liberal	19 October 1988	6 June 1991	3 years, 73 days	
Minister of Natural Resources	Ian Causley	National	6 June 1991	26 May 1993	3 years, 306 days	
Minister for Mines	Ian Causley	National	26 May 1993	4 April 1995	3 years, 306 days	
Minister for Mineral Resources	Bob Martin	Labor	4 April 1995	8 April 1999	4 years, 4 days	
Minister for Mineral Resources	Eddie Obeid	Labor	8 April 1999	2 April 2003	3 years, 359 days	
Minister for Mineral Resources	Kerry Hickey	Labor	2 April 2003	3 August 2005	2 years, 123 days	
Minister for Mineral Resources	Ian Macdonald	Labor	3 August 2005	4 December 2009	4 years, 305 days	
Minister for Mineral and Forest Resources	Ian Macdonald	Labor	4 December 2009	4 June 2010	4 years, 305 days	
Minister for Mineral and Forest Resources	Paul McLeay	Labor	4 June 2010	1 September 2010	89 days	
Minister for Mineral and Forest Resources	Steve Whan	Labor	6 September 2010	28 March 2011	209 days	
Minister for Resources and Energy	Chris Hartcher	Liberal	3 April 2011	4 December 2013	2 years, 245 days	
Minister for Resources and Energy	Anthony Roberts	Liberal	4 December 2013	2 April 2015	3 years, 57 days	
Minister for Industry, Resources and Energy	Anthony Roberts	Liberal	2 April 2015	30 January 2017	3 years, 57 days	
Minister for Resources	Don Harwin	Liberal	30 January 2017	2 April 2019	2 years, 62 days	
