= Don Harwin =

Australian politician

The Honourable Don Harwin

Special Minister of State
- In office 3 July 2020 – 21 December 2021
- Premier: Gladys Berejiklian; Dominic Perrottet
- Preceded by: Vacant
- Succeeded by: Position abolished
- In office 2 April 2019 – 15 April 2020
- Premier: Gladys Berejiklian
- Preceded by: Anthony Roberts
- Succeeded by: Vacant

Minister for the Public Service and Employee Relations, Aboriginal Affairs, and the Arts
- In office 3 July 2020 – 21 December 2021
- Premier: Gladys Berejiklian; Dominic Perrottet
- Preceded by: Gladys Berejiklian (acting)
- Succeeded by: Damien Tudehope (as Minister for Employee Relations); Ben Franklin (as Minister for Aboriginal Affairs and Minister for the Arts)
- In office 2 April 2019 – 15 April 2020
- Premier: Gladys Berejiklian
- Preceded by: Himself (as Minister for the Arts); Dominic Perrottet (as Minister for Industrial Relations); Sarah Mitchell (as Minister for the Arts)
- Succeeded by: Gladys Berejiklian (acting)

Vice-President of the Executive Council Leader of the Government in the Legislative Council
- In office 3 July 2020 – 21 December 2021
- Premier: Gladys Berejiklian; Dominic Perrottet
- Preceded by: Damien Tudehope (acting)
- Succeeded by: Damien Tudehope
- In office 30 January 2017 – 15 April 2020
- Preceded by: Duncan Gay
- Succeeded by: Damien Tudehope (acting)

Member of Legislative Council of New South Wales
- In office 27 March 1999 – 22 March 2022
- Succeeded by: Chris Rath

Minister for Resources Minister for Energy and Utilities
- In office 30 January 2017 – 23 March 2019
- Preceded by: Anthony Roberts (as Minister for Industry, Energy and Resources)
- Succeeded by: Matt Kean (as Minister for Energy and the Environment)

Minister for the Arts
- In office 30 January 2017 – 23 March 2019
- Preceded by: Troy Grant
- Succeeded by: himself (as Minister for the Public Service and Employee Relations, Aboriginal Affairs, and the Arts)

20th President of the New South Wales Legislative Council
- In office 3 May 2011 – 30 January 2017
- Preceded by: Amanda Fazio
- Succeeded by: John Ajaka

Personal details
- Born: 5 July 1964 (age 62) Sydney, New South Wales
- Party: Liberal Party
- Education: University of Sydney
- Occupation: Politician

Donald Thomas Harwin (born 5 July 1964) is an Australian politician. He was the New South Wales Special Minister of State and the Minister for the Public Service and Employee Relations, Aboriginal Affairs, and the Arts in the second Berejiklian ministry since April 2019; and the Vice-President of the Executive Council, and the Leader of the Government in the Legislative Council since January 2017 in the Berejiklian government. He briefly resigned from his roles with effect from 15 April 2020, but was reinstated on 3 July 2020.

Harwin was a member of the New South Wales Legislative Council, representing the Liberal Party, from 27 March 1999 until his resignation on 22 March 2022.

Harwin served as the Minister for the Arts, the Minister for Resources and the Minister for Energy and Utilities in the first Berejiklian ministry, from January 2017 until March 2019, and served as the twentieth President of the New South Wales Legislative Council between May 2011 and January 2017.

== Early years and background ==
Harwin was born to parents Don and Evelyn Harwin. He joined the Liberal Party in Lugarno and the Young Liberals in Earlwood in 1983 and graduated from the University of Sydney in 1985 with a Bachelor of Economics (Honours). While at university, Harwin was a member of the Sydney University Liberal Club and subsequently had life membership conferred by that club.

In 1987, Harwin commenced working as an assistant on electoral matters in the office of Ron Phillips. Harwin worked for a number of ministers in the Greiner and Fahey Liberal governments between 1988 and 1990 and 1991 and 1995. Between 1988 and 1990, Harwin was NSW President of the Young Liberal movement, becoming a member of the State Executive of the NSW branch of the Liberal Party during the same period. Harwin was re-elected to the Liberal Party State Executive, serving between 1994 and 2000. Appointed the Assistant Campaign Director of the NSW Liberal Party between 1990 and 1991, Harwin became a public affairs consultant between 1995 and 1999.

He takes a strong interest in psephological matters as well as political history, frequently providing strategic advice to the Liberal party on State and Federal redistribution processes. He has also contributed two chapters to the book Social Justice: Fraud or Fair Go? edited by Dr Marlene Goldsmith. He also contributed "1971 State General Election" to The People's Choice (Volume III), edited by Hogan and Clune, "Sir Joseph Carruthers" to The Premiers of NSW (Volume II), edited by Clune and Turner, and "Women in the NSW Coalition Parties" (with Jenny Gardiner MLC) to No Fit Place for Women, edited by Brennan and Chappel.

== Political career ==
Pre-selected for the sixth position on the joint Liberal–National coalition election ticket for the 1999 NSW state election, Harwin was elected as a Member of the New South Wales Legislative Council, being the thirteenth candidate elected at that election. Serving an eight-year term, Harwin was re-elected at the 2007 NSW state election, at which he was the seventh candidate elected. He continued to serve as opposition whip in the Legislative Council.

Harwin was elected Opposition Whip on 3 April 2003 following the retirement of John Jobling AM. Harwin was also appointed a Trustee of the Parliamentary Contributory Superannuation Fund. In 2000, he raised the issue of unsafe railway tracks in the Illawarra region, claiming that trains could only run at twenty kilometres because of faulty maintenance.

Following his re-election, Harwin served as Deputy Chair of the Procedure Committee and had successfully moved a motion in the Upper House to create a Select Committee on Electoral and Political Party Funding, of which he served as Deputy Chair. Following the election of the O'Farrell-Stoner Liberal/National coalition government, Harwin was elected President of the Legislative Council and chair of the Procedure Committee. In a submission to the Senate Standing Committees on Legal and Constitutional Affairs in regards to the Marriage Equality Amendment Bill 2010, he expressed his strong support for legal equality for same-sex couples. In reference to calls for civil unions he stated "The establishment by government of a new and separate institution for same-sex couples only compounds rather than resolves this issue of inequality." On 19 June 2014, in his role as President of the Legislative Council, he controversially used the powers under Standing Order 192 to eject a Greens MP, Jeremy Buckingham, from the chamber until the end of the sitting after the MP accused him of "running interference" in defence of government members during Question Time.

In October 2016, in the wake of the release of taped conversations where U.S. presidential candidate Donald Trump bragged about his fame allowing him to grope women, a motion was tabled by Greens Legislative Councillor Jeremy Buckingham to condemn the Republican nominee's statements. The motion included the statement that the NSW parliament "agrees with those who have described Mr Trump as 'a revolting slug' unfit for public office". As the president of the upper house, Harwin allowed the term "revolting slug" to stand as suitable parliamentary language. The motion was passed.

Following the resignation of Mike Baird as Premier, Gladys Berejiklian was elected as Liberal leader and sworn in as Premier. The first Berejiklian ministry was subsequently formed. Harwin resigned as President of the Legislative Council and was subsequently sworn in as the Minister for Resources, the Minister for Energy and Utilities, the Minister for the Arts, and the Vice-President of the Executive Council with effect from 30 January 2017. Following the 2019 state election Harwin was sworn in as the Special Minister of State, the Minister for Public Services and Employee Relations, Aboriginal Affairs and the Arts, and the Vice-President of the Executive Council in the second Berejiklian ministry with effect from 2 April 2019. He continued in his previous role as the Leader of the Government Business in the Legislative Council.

Harwin resigned as Minister of the Arts on 10 April 2020, effective 15 April 2020, after being fined for supposedly defying the ban on non-essential travel during the COVID-19 pandemic in Australia. On 3 July 2020, his fine was dismissed and his ministerial and parliamentary portfolios were reinstated.

On 18 December 2021 Harwin announced that he opted not to be considered in the new ministry for personal reasons. Harwin resigned from the Legislative Council on 22 March 2022.

Harwin was NSW Liberal Party President when the party missed the deadline to nominate candidates in a number of councils.

== Personal life ==
In a speech to the Legislative Council on 20 November 2014, Harwin publicly disclosed that he is gay.

In March 2025, Harwin was appointed to the board of the Maritime Museum.

== See also ==
- First Berejiklian ministry
- Second Berejiklian ministry

Political offices
Preceded by Anthony Roberts	Special Minister of State; 2019–2020; 2020–2021	Vacant
Preceded by Duncan Gay	Vice-President of the Executive Council; 2019–2020; 2020–2021	Succeeded by Damien Tudehope
Preceded by Damien Tudehope	Vice-President of the Executive Council; 2019–2020; 2020–2021	Succeeded by Damien Tudehope
Preceded by Dominic Perrottet as Minister for Industrial Relations	Minister for the Public Service and Employee Relations, Aboriginal Affairs, and the Arts; 2019–2020; 2020–2021	Succeeded by Damien Tudehope as Minister for Employee Relations
Preceded by Sarah Mitchell as Minister for Aboriginal Affairs	Minister for the Public Service and Employee Relations, Aboriginal Affairs, and the Arts; 2019–2020; 2020–2021	Succeeded by Ben Franklin as Minister for Aboriginal Affairs and Minister for the Arts
Preceded by himself as Minister for the Arts	Minister for the Public Service and Employee Relations, Aboriginal Affairs, and the Arts; 2019–2020; 2020–2021	Succeeded by Ben Franklin as Minister for Aboriginal Affairs and Minister for the Arts
Preceded by Troy Grant	Minister for the Arts; 2017–2019	Succeeded by himself as Minister for the Public Service and Employee Relations, Aboriginal Affairs, and the Arts
Preceded by Anthony Roberts as Minister for Industry, Resources and Energy	Minister for Resources; Minister for Energy and Utilities; 2017–2019	Succeeded by Matt Kean as Minister for Energy and Environment
New South Wales Legislative Council
Preceded by Amanda Fazio	President of the New South Wales Legislative Council; 2011–2017	Succeeded by John Ajaka
Party political offices
Preceded by Duncan Gay	Leader of the Government in the Legislative Council; 2019–2020; 2020–2021	Succeeded by Damien Tudehope
Preceded by Damien Tudehope	Leader of the Government in the Legislative Council; 2019–2020; 2020–2021	Succeeded by Damien Tudehope
