= Electoral results for the district of Dubbo =

Election results for Dubbo, New South Wales, Australia

Dubbo, an electoral district of the Legislative Assembly in the Australian state of New South Wales, has had two incarnations, the first from 1895 to 1904, the second from 1930 to the present.

== Members for Dubbo ==
First incarnation (1894–1904)
Election	Member	Party
1894	James Morgan	Protectionist
1895	Simeon Phillips	Free Trade
1898	Simeon Phillips	Free Trade
1901	Simeon Phillips	Liberal Reform
Second incarnation (1930–present)
Election	Member	Party
1930	Alfred McClelland	Labor
1932	George Wilson	Country
1935	George Wilson	Country
1938	George Wilson	Country
1941	George Wilson	Country
1942 by	Clarrie Robertson	Labor
1944	Clarrie Robertson	Labor
1947	Clarrie Robertson	Labor
1950	Robert Medcalf	Country
1953	Clarrie Robertson	Labor
1956	Clarrie Robertson	Labor
1959	Les Ford	Liberal
1962	Les Ford	Liberal
1965	John Mason	Liberal
1968	John Mason	Liberal
1971	John Mason	Liberal
1973	John Mason	Liberal
1976	John Mason	Liberal
1978	John Mason	Liberal
1981	Gerry Peacocke	National
1984	Gerry Peacocke	National
1988	Gerry Peacocke	National
1991	Gerry Peacocke	National
1995	Gerry Peacocke	National
1999	Tony McGrane	Independent
2003	Tony McGrane	Independent
2004 by	Dawn Fardell	Independent
2007	Dawn Fardell	Independent
2011	Troy Grant	National
2015	Troy Grant	National
2019	Dugald Saunders	National
2023	Dugald Saunders	National

== Election results ==
=== Elections in the 2020s ===
==== 2023 ====
2023 New South Wales state election: Dubbo
Party	Candidate	Votes	%	±%
National	Dugald Saunders	26,907	54.3	+16.9
Labor	Josh Black	10,859	21.9	+7.1
Shooters, Fishers, Farmers	Kate Richardson	7,035	14.2	+0.5
Legalise Cannabis	Mark Littlejohn	2,197	4.4	+4.4
Greens	Robyn Thomas	1,761	3.6	−0.1
Sustainable Australia	Anthony Nugent	785	1.6	+1.6
Total formal votes		49,544	96.9	+0.7
Informal votes		1,595	3.1	−0.7
Turnout		51,139	88.3	−1.2
Two-party-preferred result
National	Dugald Saunders	29,479	68.6	+0.5
Labor	Josh Black	13,515	31.4	−0.5
National hold		Swing	+0.5	

=== Elections in the 2010s ===
==== 2019 ====
2019 New South Wales state election: Dubbo
Party	Candidate	Votes	%	±%
National	Dugald Saunders	18,131	37.42	−23.04
Independent	Mathew Dickerson	13,771	28.42	+28.42
Labor	Stephen Lawrence	7,151	14.76	−8.72
Shooters, Fishers, Farmers	Lara Quealy	6,636	13.70	+13.70
Greens	Rod Pryor	1,771	3.65	−0.77
Conservatives	April Salter	681	1.41	+1.41
Flux	Joanne Cotterill	314	0.65	+0.65
Total formal votes		48,455	96.23	−0.50
Informal votes		1,900	3.77	+0.50
Turnout		50,355	89.98	−0.91
Two-party-preferred result
National	Dugald Saunders	23,070	68.16	−2.27
Labor	Stephen Lawrence	10,778	31.84	+2.27
Two-candidate-preferred result
National	Dugald Saunders	19,920	52.02	−18.40
Independent	Mathew Dickerson	18,370	47.98	+47.98
National hold				

==== 2015 ====
2015 New South Wales state election: Dubbo
Party	Candidate	Votes	%	±%
National	Troy Grant	28,165	60.5	+0.3
Labor	Stephen Lawrence	10,939	23.5	+14.0
Greens	Matt Parmeter	2,062	4.4	+0.8
Independent	Colin Hamilton	1,960	4.2	+4.2
No Land Tax	Ben Shepherd	1,306	2.8	+2.8
Christian Democrats	Peter Scherer	1,181	2.5	+2.5
Independent	Rod Pryor	973	2.1	+2.1
Total formal votes		46,586	96.7	−0.5
Informal votes		1,578	3.3	+0.5
Turnout		48,164	90.9	+3.4
Two-party-preferred result
National	Troy Grant	29,932	70.4	−10.9
Labor	Stephen Lawrence	12,571	29.6	+10.9
National hold		Swing	−10.9	

==== 2011 ====
2011 New South Wales state election: Dubbo
Party	Candidate	Votes	%	±%
National	Troy Grant	27,191	60.0	+17.4
Independent	Dawn Fardell	14,129	31.2	−10.5
Labor	Andrew Brooks	2,893	6.4	−4.8
Greens	Matt Parmeter	1,119	2.5	+0.0
Total formal votes		45,332	98.1	+0.3
Informal votes		898	1.9	−0.3
Turnout		46,230	94.4	+0.2
Notional two-party-preferred count
National	Troy Grant	31,271	83.9	+8.9
Labor	Andrew Brooks	5,983	16.1	−8.9
Two-candidate-preferred result
National	Troy Grant	27,714	63.7	+14.5
Independent	Dawn Fardell	15,827	36.4	−14.5
National gain from Independent		Swing	+14.5	

=== Elections in the 2000s ===
==== 2007 ====
2007 New South Wales state election: Dubbo
Party	Candidate	Votes	%	±%
National	Greg Matthews	18,702	42.6	−1.2
Independent	Dawn Fardell	18,296	41.7	+8.0
Labor	Adrian Hough	4,889	11.1	−4.6
Greens	Jan McDonald	1,074	2.4	−0.3
Christian Democrats	Michael Sichel	952	2.2	+2.1
Total formal votes		43,913	97.8	−0.5
Informal votes		988	2.2	+0.5
Turnout		44,901	94.2	
Notional two-party-preferred count
National	Greg Matthews	22,936	75.0	+4.4
Labor	Adrian Hough	7,648	25.0	−4.4
Two-candidate-preferred result
Independent	Dawn Fardell	20,584	50.9	+0.6
National	Greg Matthews	19,877	49.1	−0.6
Independent hold		Swing	+0.6	

==== 2004 by-election ====
2004 Dubbo by-election Saturday 20 November
Party	Candidate	Votes	%	±%
Independent	Dawn Fardell	19,511	50.56	+50.56
National	Jen Cowley	16,365	42.41	+4.19
Greens	Terrance Loughlin	1,390	3.60	+0.92
Independent	Makere Rangihaeata	1,326	3.44	+3.44
Total formal votes		38,592	98.50	+0.18
Informal votes		589	1.50	−0.18
Turnout		39,181	88.92	−5.20
Two-candidate-preferred result
Independent	Dawn Fardell	20,794	55.24	
National	Jen Cowley	16,847	44.76	
Independent hold		Swing	N/A	

Tony McGrane (Independent) died.

==== 2003 ====
2003 New South Wales state election: Dubbo
Party	Candidate	Votes	%	±%
Independent	Tony McGrane	16,696	41.3	+18.6
National	Mark Horton	15,460	38.2	+6.4
Labor	Leo Dawson	6,092	15.1	−5.2
Greens	Steve Maier	1,082	2.7	+1.4
One Nation	Ian Hutchins	651	1.6	−16.5
AAFI	Ronald Atkins	466	1.2	+1.2
Total formal votes		40,447	98.3	+0.2
Informal votes		690	1.7	−0.2
Turnout		41,137	94.1	
Notional two-party-preferred count
National	Mark Horton	19,886	68.7	+8.2
Labor	Leo Dawson	9,063	31.3	−8.2
Two-candidate-preferred result
Independent	Tony McGrane	20,099	55.0	+5.0
National	Mark Horton	16,413	45.0	−5.0
Independent hold		Swing	+5.0	

=== Elections in the 1990s ===
==== 1999 ====
1999 New South Wales state election: Dubbo
Party	Candidate	Votes	%	±%
National	Richard Mutton	12,597	31.8	−33.4
Independent	Tony McGrane	8,977	22.7	+22.7
Labor	Warren Mundine	8,016	20.3	−8.2
One Nation	John Neville	7,166	18.1	+18.1
Independent	Peter Keough	1,711	4.3	+4.3
Democrats	Chris Dunkerley	593	1.5	+0.4
Greens	Cara Phillips	513	1.3	+1.3
Total formal votes		39,573	98.1	+3.0
Informal votes		756	1.9	−3.0
Turnout		40,329	94.5	
Notional two-party-preferred count
National	Richard Mutton	17,734	60.5	−8.9
Labor	Warren Mundine	11,566	39.5	+8.9
Two-candidate-preferred result
Independent	Tony McGrane	15,358	50.02	+50.0
National	Richard Mutton	15,344	49.98	−19.4
Independent gain from National		Swing	+50.0	

==== 1995 ====
1995 New South Wales state election: Dubbo
Party	Candidate	Votes	%	±%
National	Gerry Peacocke	21,980	63.9	+3.3
Labor	Bob Green	10,355	30.1	+1.1
Call to Australia	Bruce Johnstone	2,081	6.0	+1.8
Total formal votes		34,416	94.8	+2.1
Informal votes		1,889	5.2	−2.1
Turnout		36,305	93.8	
Two-party-preferred result
National	Gerry Peacocke	23,135	68.0	+1.1
Labor	Bob Green	10,903	32.0	−1.1
National hold		Swing	+1.1	

==== 1991 ====
1991 New South Wales state election: Dubbo
Party	Candidate	Votes	%	±%
National	Gerry Peacocke	19,155	60.5	−10.4
Labor	Owen Evans	9,160	28.9	+0.9
Democrats	Ken Graham	1,977	6.2	+5.2
Call to Australia	Ian Bones	1,353	4.3	+4.3
Total formal votes		31,645	92.7	−5.1
Informal votes		2,501	7.3	+5.1
Turnout		34,146	93.9	
Two-party-preferred result
National	Gerry Peacocke	20,494	66.9	−4.7
Labor	Owen Evans	10,154	33.1	+4.7
National hold		Swing	−4.7	

=== Elections in the 1980s ===
==== 1988 ====
1988 New South Wales state election: Dubbo
Party	Candidate	Votes	%	±%
National	Gerry Peacocke	21,335	71.3	+6.7
Labor	Graham Mantova	8,567	28.7	−6.7
Total formal votes		29,902	97.8	−0.7
Informal votes		660	2.2	+0.7
Turnout		30,562	95.3	
National hold		Swing	+6.7	

==== 1984 ====
1984 New South Wales state election: Dubbo
Party	Candidate	Votes	%	±%
National	Gerry Peacocke	20,324	64.9	+28.4
Labor	Gordon Lerve	10,973	35.1	−2.4
Total formal votes		31,297	98.5	+0.3
Informal votes		480	1.5	−0.3
Turnout		31,777	92.7	+0.3
National hold		Swing	+5.7	

==== 1981 ====
1981 New South Wales state election: Dubbo
Party	Candidate	Votes	%	±%
Labor	Peter Morgan	11,256	37.5	−9.1
National Country	Gerry Peacocke	10,972	36.5	+36.5
Liberal	Eric Woods	7,831	26.0	−27.4
Total formal votes		30,059	98.2	
Informal votes		542	1.8	
Turnout		30,601	92.4	
Two-party-preferred result
National Country	Gerry Peacocke	17,494	59.2	+59.2
Labor	Peter Morgan	12,042	40.8	−5.8
National Country gain from Liberal		Swing	N/A	

=== Elections in the 1970s ===
==== 1978 ====
1978 New South Wales state election: Dubbo
Party	Candidate	Votes	%	±%
Liberal	John Mason	13,741	53.4	+13.0
Labor	Roger Grealy	11,998	46.6	+15.2
Total formal votes		25,739	98.2	−1.1
Informal votes		470	1.8	+1.1
Turnout		26,209	94.2	−0.4
Liberal hold		Swing	−10.0	

==== 1976 ====
1976 New South Wales state election: Dubbo
Party	Candidate	Votes	%	±%
Liberal	John Mason	9,942	40.4	−20.4
Labor	Damian Hession	7,728	31.4	−2.6
Independent	Gerry Peacocke	6,939	28.2	+28.2
Total formal votes		24,609	99.3	+0.5
Informal votes		166	0.7	−0.5
Turnout		24,775	94.6	+0.3
Two-party-preferred result
Liberal	John Mason	15,612	63.4	−1.6
Labor	Damian Hession	8,997	36.6	+1.6
Liberal hold		Swing	−1.6	

==== 1973 ====
1973 New South Wales state election: Dubbo
Party	Candidate	Votes	%	±%
Liberal	John Mason	13,695	60.8	+9.0
Labor	Emily Renshaw	7,649	34.0	−6.2
Democratic Labor	Michael Stephens	1,173	5.2	−2.8
Total formal votes		22,517	98.8	
Informal votes		283	1.2	
Turnout		22,800	94.3	
Two-party-preferred result
Liberal	John Mason	14,633	65.0	+6.8
Labor	Emily Renshaw	7,884	35.0	−6.8
Liberal hold		Swing	+6.8	

==== 1971 ====
1971 New South Wales state election: Dubbo
Party	Candidate	Votes	%	±%
Liberal	John Mason	10,598	51.8	−13.4
Labor	Norman Cox	8,229	40.2	+5.3
Democratic Labor	Terence Catley	1,639	8.0	+8.0
Total formal votes		20,466	98.7	
Informal votes		279	1.3	
Turnout		20,745	94.2	
Two-party-preferred result
Liberal	John Mason	11,909	58.2	−7.0
Labor	Norman Cox	8,557	41.8	+7.0
Liberal hold		Swing	−7.0	

=== Elections in the 1960s ===
==== 1968 ====
1968 New South Wales state election: Dubbo
Party	Candidate	Votes	%	±%
Liberal	John Mason	13,107	65.1	+30.9
Labor	Robert Scarff	7,010	34.9	−0.1
Total formal votes		20,117	98.8	
Informal votes		246	1.2	
Turnout		20,363	95.5	
Liberal hold		Swing	+2.6	

==== 1965 ====
1965 New South Wales state election: Dubbo
Party	Candidate	Votes	%	±%
Labor	Kenneth Mason	6,904	35.0	−3.9
Liberal	John Mason	6,749	34.2	−21.7
Country	Roderick Mack	6,096	30.9	+30.9
Total formal votes		19,749	99.0	−0.1
Informal votes		204	1.0	+0.1
Turnout		19,953	95.6	+1.0
Two-party-preferred result
Liberal	John Mason	12,371	62.6	+4.6
Labor	Kenneth Mason	7,378	37.4	−4.6
Liberal hold		Swing	+4.6	

==== 1962 ====
1962 New South Wales state election: Dubbo
Party	Candidate	Votes	%	±%
Liberal	Les Ford	10,693	55.9	+26.9
Labor	Martin Berry	7,445	38.9	−0.7
Independent	Clarrie Robertson	981	5.1	+5.1
Total formal votes		19,119	99.1	
Informal votes		175	0.9	
Turnout		19,294	94.6	
Two-party-preferred result
Liberal	Les Ford	11,085	58.0	+0.9
Labor	Martin Berry	8,034	42.0	−0.9
Liberal hold		Swing	+0.9	

=== Elections in the 1950s ===
==== 1959 ====
1959 New South Wales state election: Dubbo
Party	Candidate	Votes	%	±%
Labor	Clarrie Robertson	7,216	39.6	
Liberal	Les Ford	5,280	29.0	
Country	Roderick Mack	5,105	28.0	
Democratic Labor	Brian Adams	610	3.4	
Total formal votes		18,211	98.7	
Informal votes		241	1.3	
Turnout		18,452	95.2	
Two-party-preferred result
Liberal	Les Ford	10,398	57.1	
Labor	Clarrie Robertson (defeated)	7,813	42.9	
Liberal gain from Labor		Swing		

==== 1956 ====
1956 New South Wales state election: Dubbo
Party	Candidate	Votes	%	±%
Labor	Clarrie Robertson	8,241	46.8	−5.2
Country	Keith Sullivan	4,887	27.8	−20.2
Liberal	Neville Magin	4,472	25.4	+25.4
Total formal votes		17,600	98.9	+0.7
Informal votes		200	1.1	−0.7
Turnout		17,800	93.2	−1.6
Two-party-preferred result
Labor	Clarrie Robertson	9,018	51.2	−0.8
Country	Keith Sullivan	8,582	48.8	+0.8
Labor hold		Swing	−0.8	

==== 1953 ====
1953 New South Wales state election: Dubbo
Party	Candidate	Votes	%	±%
Labor	Clarrie Robertson	8,831	52.0	
Country	Robert Medcalf	8,140	48.0	
Total formal votes		16,971	98.2	
Informal votes		302	1.8	
Turnout		17,273	94.8	
Labor gain from Country		Swing		

==== 1950 ====
1950 New South Wales state election: Dubbo
Party	Candidate	Votes	%	±%
Labor	Clarrie Robertson	8,342	46.8	
Country	Robert Medcalf	5,996	33.6	
Liberal	Joseph Roach	3,279	18.4	
Independent	Madge Roberts	225	1.3	
Total formal votes		17,842	98.7	
Informal votes		226	1.3	
Turnout		18,068	93.0	
Two-party-preferred result
Country	Robert Medcalf	9,177	51.4	
Labor	Clarrie Robertson	8,665	48.6	
Country gain from Labor		Swing		

=== Elections in the 1940s ===
==== 1947 ====
1947 New South Wales state election: Dubbo
Party	Candidate	Votes	%	±%
Labor	Clarrie Robertson	7,215	53.0	−4.5
Country	Thelma Harvey	4,210	30.9	+1.4
Liberal	Clarence Cook	2,186	16.1	+16.1
Total formal votes		13,611	99.1	+0.8
Informal votes		122	0.9	−0.8
Turnout		13,733	94.9	+4.8
Labor hold		Swing	N/A	

- Preferences were not distributed.

==== 1944 ====
1944 New South Wales state election: Dubbo
Party	Candidate	Votes	%	±%
Labor	Clarrie Robertson	7,268	57.5	+19.7
Country	Leslie Clark	3,732	29.5	−18.6
Country	Ernest Hoy	1,649	13.0	+13.0
Total formal votes		12,649	98.3	−0.3
Informal votes		221	1.7	+0.3
Turnout		12,870	90.1	−2.9
Labor gain from Country		Swing	N/A	

- Preferences were not distributed.
- Clarrie Robertson had won the seat for Labor at the 1942 Dubbo by-election, and retained it at this election.

==== 1942 by-election ====
1942 Dubbo by-election Saturday 6 June
Party	Candidate	Votes	%	±%
Labor	Clarrie Robertson	6,206	53.62	
Independent	Harold Thorby	2,801	24.20	
Country	Alfred Yeo	2,567	22.18	
Total formal votes		11,574	98.96	
Informal votes		122	1.04	
Turnout		11,696	77.53	
Labor gain from Country		Swing		

George Wilson (Country) died.

==== 1941 ====
1941 New South Wales state election: Dubbo
Party	Candidate	Votes	%	±%
Country	George Wilson	6,517	48.1	
Labor	Clarence Robertson	5,123	37.8	
Independent Labor	Frank Wilkins	1,897	14.0	
Total formal votes		13,537	98.6	
Informal votes		197	1.4	
Turnout		13,734	93.0	
Two-party-preferred result
Country	George Wilson	6,898	51.0	
Labor	Clarence Robertson	6,639	49.0	
Country hold		Swing		

=== Elections in the 1930s ===
==== 1938 ====
1938 New South Wales state election: Dubbo
Party	Candidate	Votes	%	±%
Country	George Wilson	7,656	55.1	+0.1
Labor	Leo Taylor	6,242	44.9	−0.1
Total formal votes		13,898	97.9	−0.5
Informal votes		292	2.1	+0.5
Turnout		14,190	95.4	−1.2
Country hold		Swing	+0.1	

==== 1935 ====
1935 New South Wales state election: Dubbo
Party	Candidate	Votes	%	±%
Country	George Wilson	7,568	55.0	+6.3
Labor (NSW)	Alfred McClelland	6,184	45.0	+8.8
Total formal votes		13,752	98.4	−0.2
Informal votes		220	1.6	+0.2
Turnout		13,972	96.6	+1.9
Country hold		Swing	N/A	

==== 1932 ====
1932 New South Wales state election: Dubbo
Party	Candidate	Votes	%	±%
Country	George Wilson	6,300	48.7	+2.9
Labor (NSW)	Alfred McClelland	4,675	36.2	−14.8
United Australia	John Macdonald	1,342	10.4	+10.4
Federal Labor	Harry O'Shea	608	4.7	+4.7
Total formal votes		12,925	98.6	+0.3
Informal votes		179	1.4	−0.3
Turnout		13,104	94.7	0.0
After distribution of preferences
Country	George Wilson	6,465	50.0	
Labor (NSW)	Alfred McClelland	4,875	37.7	
United Australia	John Macdonald	1,585	12.3	
Country gain from Labor (NSW)		Swing	N/A	

- Preferences were not distributed to completion.

==== 1930 ====
1930 New South Wales state election: Dubbo
Party	Candidate	Votes	%	±%
Labor	Alfred McClelland	6,615	51.0	
Country	Harold Thorby (defeated)	5,943	45.8	
Australian	Rodolph Purkis	412	3.2	
Total formal votes		12,970	98.3	
Informal votes		220	1.7	
Turnout		13,190	94.7	
Labor win		(new seat)		

Dubbo was a re-created district. Harold Thorby (Country) was the sitting member for Castlereagh.

==== 1904–1930 ====
District abolished

==== 1901 ====
This section is an excerpt from 1901 New South Wales state election § Dubbo

1901 New South Wales state election: Dubbo
Party	Candidate	Votes	%	±%
Liberal Reform	Simeon Phillips	1,094	58.0	+1.3
Progressive	Edwin Utley	492	26.1	−17.2
Labour	Linus Bungate	301	16.0	
Total formal votes		1,887	99.5	+0.4
Informal votes		9	0.5	−0.4
Turnout		1,896	61.6	−4.5
Liberal Reform hold				

=== Elections in the 1890s ===
==== 1898 ====
This section is an excerpt from 1898 New South Wales colonial election § Dubbo

1898 New South Wales colonial election: Dubbo
Party	Candidate	Votes	%	±%
Free Trade	Simeon Phillips	925	56.7	
National Federal	James Morgan	707	43.3	
Total formal votes		1,632	99.9	
Informal votes		2	0.1	
Turnout		1,634	66.1	
Free Trade hold				

==== 1895 ====
This section is an excerpt from 1895 New South Wales colonial election § Dubbo

1895 New South Wales colonial election: Dubbo
Party	Candidate	Votes	%	±%
Free Trade	Simeon Phillips	689	51.0	
Protectionist	James Morgan	663	49.0	
Total formal votes		1,352	99.6	
Informal votes		6	0.4	
Turnout		1,358	71.2	
Free Trade gain from Protectionist				

==== 1894 ====
This section is an excerpt from 1894 New South Wales colonial election § Dubbo

1894 New South Wales colonial election: Dubbo
Party	Candidate	Votes	%	±%
Protectionist	James Morgan	645	40.6	
Free Trade	Simeon Phillips	604	38.0	
Labour	William Wilkinson	341	21.5	
Total formal votes		1,590	98.9	
Informal votes		18	1.1	
Turnout		1,608	78.5	
Protectionist win		(new seat)		
