= 1942 Dubbo state by-election =

Election result for Dubbo, New South Wales, Australia

A by-election was held for the New South Wales Legislative Assembly seat of Dubbo on 6 June 1942. It was triggered by the death of George Wilson (Country).

== Dates ==
Date	Event
24 April 1942	George Wilson died.
11 May 1942	Writ of election issued by the Speaker of the Legislative Assembly and close of electoral rolls.
18 May 1942	Day of nomination
6 June 1942	Polling day
15 June 1942	Return of writ

== Results ==
1942 Dubbo by-election Saturday 6 June
Party	Candidate	Votes	%	±%
Labor	Clarrie Robertson	6,206	53.62	
Independent	Harold Thorby	2,801	24.20	
Country	Alfred Yeo	2,567	22.18	
Total formal votes		11,574	98.96	
Informal votes		122	1.04	
Turnout		11,696	77.53	
Labor gain from Country		Swing		

== See also ==
- Electoral results for the district of Dubbo
- List of New South Wales state by-elections
