= Nubrygyn Inn and Cemetery =

- Location within New South Wales Location within Australia
- 32°56′02″S 149°02′33″E
- Location: 2531 Euchareena Road, Euchareena, Dubbo Regional Council, New South Wales, Australia

History
- Built: 1840–1850

New South Wales Heritage Register
- Official name: Nubrygyn Inn and Cemetery; Nubrigyn; Nubrygin; Nubrygan; Nubriggan; Newbriggan; Nubrygar; Aubrygan; Lubrygyn; Lubrycan; Yelubrygyn; Eulubrigyn and Lubrygee
- Type: State heritage (built)
- Designated: 20 May 2016
- Reference no.: 1976
- Type: Inn/Tavern
- Category: Commercial

The Nubrygyn Inn and Cemetery is a heritage-listed former inn and farm house located at 2531 Euchareena Road, Euchareena in the Dubbo Regional Council local government area of New South Wales, Australia. The inn was built between 1840 and 1850, possibly by William Brazier. The property is also known as Nubrigyn, Nubrygin, Nubrygan, Nubriggan, Newbriggan, Nubrygar, Aubrygan, Lubrygyn, Lubrycan, Yelubrygyn, Eulubrigyn 'Yulubragin, Yullubirgen (Wiradjuri)'and Lubrygee. The property was added to the New South Wales State Heritage Register on 20 May 2016.

== History ==
=== The Wellington Valley ===
At the time of European settlement, the land between Bathurst and Wellington was occupied by the Wiradjuri people whose land extended from the Great Dividing Range in the east and bordered by the Macquarie, Lachlan and Murrumbidgee rivers. The rivers acted as an important travel and trade routes with each clan group having a clearly defined area of responsibility. The people from this area settled along the main rivers during the summer months and moved to other favoured and drier campsites in the winter months. Evidence of the occupation of the Wellington area by the Wiradjuri in pre-contact times survives in the form of rock shelters with deposits, carved trees, scarred trees, open camp sites, grinding grooves sites, bora (ceremonial) grounds and burial grounds (AHIMS). The name Nubrygyn derives from the Aboriginal name "Lubrygee", said to mean junction of the two creeks.

The first Europeans officially travelling through this country were members of the expedition party led by John Oxley, Surveyor-General for the Colony. It was during his exploration of the Lachlan Valley that he discovered the Wellington Valley on 19 August 1817, when the explorers entered the valley through Glenfinlass (Curra Creek) finding and naming the Bell and Macquarie rivers. Oxley called the valley "The Vale of Tempe" after the Duke of Wellington. Nubrygyn is situated about 50 kilometres (31 mi) from Wellington and is surrounded by many hectares of farmland, producing wheat, sheep, cattle and canola. The nearby village of Euchareena was originally known as Warne, after an early settler.

=== Nubrygyn ===
The locality of Nubrygyn was established in the period 1823–1830, on the original road from Bathurst to the Wellington Convict farm, and also on route from Molong to Ironbark (now Stuart Town). It is adjacent to the spring fed Nubrygyn Creek, which is a tributary of the Bell River. It became a "halting place" for soldiers and convicts travelling between the newly established depots at Bathurst and Wellington (The Land 1934, 19 Jan:3). A large gum tree on the northern side of the Nubrygyn Inn is said to have been the tree that convicts were chained to when they halted to rest.

The area was surveyed by John Rogers in 1829, and Thomas Kite is noted as a landholder. Captain Charles Wray Finch (magistrate, pastoralist and later Parliamentary Sergeant-at-Arms) appears to have occupied land at Nubrygyn in 1835 (The Land 1934, 19 Jan: 3, Letters from C. W. Finch State Archives Kingswood). Another article suggests that he moved his family there in 1839 (Richmond River Herald. 1937, 6 Aug:5) and he was still occupying some land there and farming sheep in 1846 (Molong Express 1934, 12 Jan:17), later taken over by his sons.

The original conveyance for the Nubrygyn area was to Charles Frederick Warne and Charles Windeyer. Warne owned 1,040 hectares (2,560 acres) and was the first recorded owner of the actual site of the Nubrygyn Inn. In 1843 Warne went bankrupt and the papers include a list of all inhabitants of Nubrygyn working for him, including William Brazier (Insolvency 685, NSW State Archives). The land then passed to Dr John Dobie (mortgagor) and then to John Maxwell, Superintendent of Stock for NSW and the Wellington Valley Settlement, and a large land holder in the Nubrygyn area.

In 1853 William Brazier purchased 102 hectares (252 acres) including the site of the Nubrygyn Inn from John Maxwell. This document includes a map and plan showing the purchased land included Nubrygyn Inn and "Braziers huts" immediately adjacent to it, thus indicating that the Braziers were already living in or adjacent to the Inn prior to their purchase of the land.

=== Nubrygyn Inn ===
The actual builder of the Inn has not been identified. Possible builders include Warne, John Dobie, John Maxwell and William Brazier. Of these John Maxwell or William Brazier are the most likely (Warne leaving in 1843, and Dobie probably not being a resident). Research into the techniques used to build the mud-brick building, such as brick size and material, mortar material, stone work, etc. may clarify the date and builder (Lewis n.d.). The Brazier family history and conveyancing records demonstrate that the inn was already built in 1850, but the exact date is not known.

William Brazier along with his two brothers James and Francis immigrated to Australia as free settlers in 1838. They came from Little Shelford in Cambridgeshire, the same small village as Charles Wray Finch, whose father Henry Finch the Rector at Little Shelford had given the Brazier brothers references to immigrate as free settlers (Australian Town & Country Journal 1873, 7 June:9; William Brazier's immigration certificate). Upon his arrival in Australia William Brazier (who had been offered employment by Charles Wray Finch) travelled to Nubrygyn and commenced working there. In 1843 he was working for Warne at Nubrygyn. In April 1847 at Shepherds Creek, six point four kilometres (four miles) east of Nubrygyn, William Brazier married Caroline, the daughter of two convicts William Coleman and Hannah Jefferies, and almost from the date of their marriage they lived and raised a large family in the Nubrygyn Inn. The Brazier's had 11 children, and with the possible exception of the first child born in 1848, they were all born and raised at Nubrygyn Inn. It was in this beautiful and inspiring landscape that they lived and raised their family, and it is still owned by their descendants. Conveyancing documents indicate that the Inn was constructed by 1850 or before, and outbuildings associated with the Inn included a blacksmith, stables, school and bakery, with accommodation for local farmhands and shepherds. William Brazier applied for and was granted General Publican Licenses for the Nubrygyn Inn, examples of these licenses include one granted with his brother Francis in the year of 1857, and 1860 William on his own (see references). William ran the Inn until his death in 1882, and his death notice states that he had lived at Nubrygyn since 1838. Francis Brazier died at Nubrygyn Inn in 1898, aged 84 years, where he was being cared for by Caroline Brazier. His death notice says that he had lived in the area since 1849. The other brother James, is listed as a witness to a burial in the Nubrygyn cemetery in 1861, indicating he also spent time at Nubrygyn.

Caroline Brazier née Coleman was born at Parramatta in 1829, but she is quoted as having witnessed a severe flood around 1842 that washed away many of the fruit trees brought from England and planted by Charles Wray Finch at Nubrygyn, and was therefore living in the district by this time. Caroline's parents William and Hannah Coleman came to Australia as convicts and were living and working at Nubrygyn, and are buried there. Caroline died at her house, the Nubrygyn Inn, in 1905, and her death notice states that she had been living in that same house/inn for 55 years, i.e.. since 1850. After Caroline's death the shingle roof was replaced (or covered) in corrugated iron and family members continued to live in it until about 30 years ago. The Brazier family still owns the Nubrygyn Inn and farm, at least 165–8 years of continuous occupancy, plus the 10–12 years William spent before that working at Nubrygyn for Finch, Warne and probably Maxwell.

A good description of Nubrygyn Inn was written in an article published in the Maitland Mercury and Hunter River General Advertiser (1877, 21 April:7) by an "old" correspondent travelling from Mudgee to Molong:

"... arrive at Nubrygyn, a transition country, with the slaty shales and quartz leaders of the diggings, combined with the alluvial flats and low, grassy ridges of a farming country. There are many fine farms, and a good inn, which has been kept by Mr Brazier for about a quarter of a century; it is a pise building, the front verandah is covered by a mass of ivy, grapevines and jasmine, the garden, besides flowers contains various and numerous fruit trees, so that in their season peaches, apricots, plums, quinces, cherries, medlars, walnut and gooseberries, are obtainable and on his neighbouring farm a profusion of melons and strawberries. As we are entering on the limestone district, springs are numerous, and Nubrygyn Creek is never dry; this certainty of water has attracted many travelling stock and the grass has been eaten off to the roots. Some fine showers have lately given a green hue to the landscape."

Another description (The Empire 1874, 1 Jan:3) describes the inn garden and farm:

"Nubrygyn was once a village of some importance, having boasted a public school, a store, a blacksmiths shop, and a hotel; but of these establishments, only one, the latter, now remains. The village is now the exclusive property of Mr William Brazier, who in conjunction with his hotel business, manages a very extensive farm, and has one of the most beautiful and flourishing flower gardens and orchards in the locality. A visit to the garden or orchard will amply repay any person imbued with a taste for the beauties of nature, or a taste for delicious fruit of every variety."

On 22 April 1865 the Nubrygyn Inn was to become famous throughout the Colony of NSW and Australia. Ben Hall, John Gilbert, John Dunn and an unknown colleague arrived at the Inn that evening, held up the bar and drank and danced all night at the Brazier's expense. The event was written up in many Australian newspapers of the day, a typical article follows (Clarence & Richmond Examiner... 2 May:3):

"Gilbert, Hall and Dunn Raid the Nubriggan

...on the evening Sunday, as Mr Brazier, landlord of the Nubriggan Inn with some other gentlemen, were enjoying their pipes, four horsemen well mounted, three of them with every appearance of wealthy gentlemen, dashed up to the door. The stoutest immediately dismounted, entered the inn, and walking up to Mr Brazier, ordered him to turn out his pockets, Mr Brazier thinking that it was making rather free, asked him sternly what he meant and ordered him behind the bar but the sight of a revolver in hand and a number around his waist caused him to unbend his brows, and submit with as good grace as possible. Gilbert turned the pockets of Mr Brazier inside out, and threw the few shillings they contained on the counter, and demanded to know where he kept his cash. He was told generally in the pockets of his pants. In the meantime Gilbert and Dunn placed all the men, women, and children that were about the house in one room, locking every door. Dunn went over to Mr Peter's house, and the house of Mr Cousin's shepherd, bringing all the inmates, ... Mr G. West had just arrived from Wellington, and was putting his horse in the stables, when Gilbert walked in ... [he was] requested to walk to the parlour. The fourth party had his face masked and muffled ... he was armed with a revolving rifle and a revolver... the drink was called for fast and furious ... between brandy and bullets they soon had nearly all the hands dancing. The dance and song went round, Gilbert and Dunn taking the principal parts, Hall remaining as a spectator, and the ranger incog. still continuing to guard outside ... Hall asked Brazier did he have a horse called Brandy? and was answered in the affirmative; he said he must have it but that Brazier would get it back. They shouted back nearly all the money they took, and, at daybreak, mounted their horses and started towards Shepherds Creek".

This event has particular significance as Ben Hall's last major hold-up before he was shot and killed less than two weeks later, on 5 May 1865. It is probable that he was still riding Brazier's best horse when he was killed. The large gum tree on the north side of the Inn (the same one convicts had been tied to) was used by the gang to tie up their horses during the hold-up. "Stand and Deliver" are the famous words Ben Hall is known to have uttered when he took up a life of bushranging and became part of Australian folklore, he and his various mates travelling the highways around the goldfields area of NSW from Bathurst to Forbes, south to Gundagai and east to Goulburn. Ben Hall carried out many bold raids, some of which were simply intended to taunt the police after joining Johnny Gardiner and some other men to carry out the famed Escort robbery at Eugowra Rocks on June 15, 1862, where the gang got away with more than 14000 pounds in gold and cash. In an incident similar to the one at Nubrygyn, Ben Hall and his mates also held locals for 3 days at the Robinson's Hotel in Canowindra, while they enjoyed themselves by drinking and merry making and as with Nubrygyn the gang members as a display of their honesty and respect for the common man insisted on paying the hotelier for the good time they had (even if it was with his own money).

Nubrygyn remained a thriving hub for travellers and stock for many years due to the permanent water in the creek and the direct route between Bathurst and Wellington. It began to decline in terms of both workers and visitors in the late 1890s after the railway had come through at Warne (renamed Euchareena), only a few miles away.

=== Nubrygyn Cemetery ===
The small historic cemetery began as a private cemetery for the burial of the two young Brazier children who died from measles in 1854. Altogether nine members of the Brazier family are buried there, including William and Caroline Brazier, three of their children, and three grandchildren, as well as William's brother Francis. In addition the parents of Caroline Brazier, William and Hannah Coleman, are also buried there. William Brazier died while being treated for an illness in a Sydney hospital in 1882 and his remains were bought all the way home by train for burial on the family property in the little cemetery he had created on the death of his two young children in 1854. The cemetery is thus closely tied to the history of the Brazier family and Nubrygyn Inn.

However, a total of 58 people are buried in the cemetery (Australian Cemeteries Index) and it is the resting place of other early settlers and their descendants who played a part in the establishment and early development of the Nubrygyn and Euchareena area. This cemetery is a valuable historical resource detailing aspects of the early life in rural New South Wales. For example, of the 58 people known to have been buried here, 35 of them were children, of those 33 were five or under, and 21 were under 1 year old. In contrast to this, many of the adults buried there are between 70 and 83 years old, some in their 50s and 60s, and very few young or middle aged people. This dichotomy is typical for rural communities of the era, reflecting the effect of "childhood ailments" and the relatively good health of people who managed to survive childhood and child bearing.

The Nubrygyn cemetery also is a useful demonstration of social networks amongst the farmers and farmworkers of the 1850s to early 1900s. Many of the other families buried in the cemetery had a relationship of some kind with the Braziers, who in effect embraced their small community and provided a burial place close by. Some of the families were neighbouring farmers, some married into the Brazier family, and some worked for the Braziers as hut-keepers, gardeners and shepherds.

For many years the cemetery lay neglected until Richard Clayton and Kate Gadsby, both direct descendants of William Brazier, got together in an attempt to restore this historic little cemetery by cleaning up the site. With funding provided by Wellington Council, a granite stone was erected, engraved with the names and dates of all persons known to be buried there (Australian Cemeteries Index). Conservation work has been undertaken at the cemetery and some burials are marked in addition to the surviving headstones and enclosures.

== Description ==
The building is located on rising ground some 70 metres from the former road which runs parallel with the Nubrygyn Creek, a tributary of the Bell River. The building footprint is 20 x 11 metres. The front of the building is the western elevation and consists of an open verandah with wooden floorboards and stone footing. The plan includes a central hall between the front and rear veranda's. A large room off the hall to the south provides the kitchen and there are two rooms off the hall to the north. The foundations are local stone laid flat with probably local mortar. The roof is corrugated iron on battens which indicate the previous timber shingle roofing. A Brazier family photo c. 1870 shows timber shingles on the main roof and verandah roof, a slightly later photo c. 1880 shows that the shingles had been replaced or covered by corrugated iron. There remains an area of original timber shingle roofing exposed under the rear eastern verandah. The timber floor structure consists of local hardwood joists supporting pit sawn timber boards with flat square edge. The house ceilings are all battened fibro. There is also a stone-walled cellar opening onto the front verandah, and another smaller verandah on the northern facade.

It is understood that a rear accommodation wing was removed from the North West corner of the building in the early 1900s and part of the stone foundation remains to indicate the extent of the rooms. Several mature garden trees including a pepper tree and fruit trees, and a vine, are an integral part of the original Inn garden and orchard. A large gum tree on the north side of the Inn is associated with the convict history and the Ben Hall hold-up of the Inn.

A small historic cemetery is associated with Nubrygyn farm and Inn, and is located about eight hundred metres from the southern side of the Nubrygyn Inn. The small cemetery has an outlook across rural hills and is on a rise almost at the highest point of the adjacent land, surrounded by paddocks and looking west about 500m to the Nubrygyn Creek. The cemetery is enclosed by a steel star picket wire fence with access through a modern-day steel gate and has a patchy and weedy ground cover.

Within the small enclosed cemetery there are 5 original headstones marking the burials of seven individuals, plus an additional wrought iron enclosure without headstone. The graves of William and Caroline Brazier are enclosed within a rusted elaborate wrought iron framework fence made up of 4 interconnecting panels, William's 1882 headstone is sandstone, with Caroline's 1905 headstone being a much larger marble monument. Caroline was the last person to be buried in the cemetery. Both headstones are weathered but structurally sound. Another sandstone headstone to the right of William and Caroline belongs to their two young children Ann Caroline and James, which were the first burials (1854) in the Nubrygyn Cemetery. Their headstone shows signs of being weather worn but is structurally sound, and although the inscription is hard to read the following was legible "died of measles" "Happy the babe who privileged by fate, to shorter labourer and lighter weight, received but yesterday the gift of breath, ordered tomorrow to return to death". On the western fence line is another sandstone headstone marking two graves, John Maurice Roche who died in 1874, and John Thompson who died in 1868. There is also another marble headstone surrounded by wrought iron fencing, marking the grave of Emanuel Thompson aged 82 who died 1897. Another smaller wrought iron enclosure without a headstone appears to enclosure a child's grave or graves. There is also a polished black granite memorial stone commemorating the total of 58 people buried in the cemetery, recently installed by the Nubrygyn History Group, including members of the Brazier family.

=== Condition ===
As at 10 August 2015, the building had not been occupied as a residence for 30 years and was used for the storage of farm equipment. The stone foundation to the perimeter is generally sound; the intervening sleeper walls have suffered from unrestrained stormwater running from the high rear ground through the cellar. The mud brick walls are generally sound with one exception in the north east corner where the roof to the veranda has been lost and the walls and chimney are damaged. The outer plaster and whitewash is generally sound. The timber windows are generally six paned double hung sliding sash type with an alteration to one window on the east elevation to form a picture window. The original shingles remain on the rear veranda (and possibly the main roof) and generally the cgi roofing iron on the roof and veranda remains in place. The gutters have all been either damaged or removed. Internally the timber floors are not sound having been exposed to white ants, poor ventilation and damp. There are two timber framed extensions to the south and northern rear elevation which provided bathrooms and laundry and these are clad in fibro. There is a redundant iron water tank to the south eastern corner of the building. Ceilings are generally fibro. The doors are generally timber panel and boarded types and in good condition. The internal walls are covered with original plaster and limewash.

The fabric of the 1840s to 1850 building is relatively intact, with minor additions under the rear verandah.

=== Modifications and dates ===
There are two 1950s timber framed extensions (bathroom and laundry) clad in fibro on the northern and southern corners of the rear western elevation. There is a picture window inserted into the rear veranda of the western elevation. There is a collapsed stone wall within the cellar beneath the central main roof. The timber shingle roof cladding was covered with galvanised iron sheeting in the late 1880s. The fibro ceilings were added in the 1950s.

== Heritage listing ==
As at 9 February 2016, the site of Nubrygyn Inn and Cemetery is of state significance for its role in the earliest frontier expansion beyond Bathurst into the Central West. It was originally a "halting" place on the 1823 road for the soldiers and convicts travelling from Bathurst to the remote Wellington convict farm. The "halting place" utilised permanent water in the adjacent Nubrygyn Creek and a surviving gum tree where convicts were chained while resting.

Nubrygyn Inn and Cemetery remains in its original landscape setting adjacent to the old road alignment, gum tree and Nubrygyn Creek. It is of state significance as a representative example in the Central West of NSW of an inn dating from the 1840s. It demonstrates how early road networks expanded and were utilised and the necessity of the provision of accommodation and refreshment for travellers in remote areas. Nubrygyn Inn and Cemetery is of state significance as a rare surviving example in the Central West of an 1840s mud-brick building that retains relatively intact original fabric and features.

Nubrygyn Inn and Cemetery is of state significance because of the unusually long and continuous occupation of the Brazier family for at least 165 years, demonstrating strong attachment to their adopted land and detailed insight into the history of a free settler family and their relations with wealthy benefactors, other settlers and former convicts, and their role in expansion of the pastoral and farming industries into the Wellington Valley. The private cemetery provides evidence of social networks between the Brazier family and their neighbours and farm workers, patterns of immigration, work and family life.

The Inn gained attention throughout the colonies in 1865 as the scene of a hold-up and hostage event involving bushrangers Ben Hall, John Gilbert, John Dunn and an unnamed co-conspirator. Hall "borrowed" Brazier's best horse and in less than two weeks was shot and killed by the police. The Nubrygyn Inn therefore contributes to the state significance story of Ben Hall, with typical pattern of hold-up, hostage-taking, "respect" for the ordinary people, horse stealing, and taunting the police.

Nubrygyn Inn and Cemetery was listed on the New South Wales State Heritage Register on 20 May 2016 having satisfied the following criteria.

The place is important in demonstrating the course, or pattern, of cultural or natural history in New South Wales.

The siting of Nubrygyn Inn and Cemetery is of state significance for its ability to demonstrate the 1823 expansion of the road network beyond Bathurst into the Central West, enabling the transport of convicts to the remote frontier Wellington convict farm, and the settlement of the Wellington Valley. Nubrygyn originated as a "halting place" for convicts and soldiers travelling on the road. A small portion of the road, the creek bank and a large gum tree within the curtilage are evidence of this earliest use of the site. This convict history transformed as convicts and emancipated convicts then worked at Nubrygyn, settled, married and died there. From the 1840s the Nubrygyn Inn played an important role in providing a wayside stop after the long and difficult time spent on the road travelling between Bathurst and Wellington. It is a surviving structure that demonstrates the way the early road networks were expanded and utilised, and the necessary provision of accommodation and refreshment for travellers.

The place has a strong or special association with a person, or group of persons, of importance of cultural or natural history of New South Wales's history.

The Nubrygyn Inn and Cemetery is of state significance for its association with Ben Hall. It is associated with the bushrangers Ben Hall, Johnny Gilbert and John Dunn through the 1865 robbery and hostage event at the Nubrygyn Inn, and the stealing of the Brazier's best horse for Ben Hall's use, demonstrating the impact of bushranging on rural communities and travellers in the mid-1800s. Nubrygyn Inn and Cemetery contribute to the significance of the SHR-listed Ben Hall Sites which are important elements in the construction of the Australian identity, the pre-Federation nationalist sentiment, and the public interest in bushranging.

Nubrygyn Inn and Cemetery's association with convict history began with the site's function as a "halting place" and transformed as convicts and emancipated convicts later worked at Nubrygyn Inn, settled, married and died there.

The place is important in demonstrating aesthetic characteristics and/or a high degree of creative or technical achievement in New South Wales.

The Nubrygyn Inn and Cemetery is of state significance as a rare surviving example of a mud-brick building of the 1840s era. The integrity of the inn's mud-brick envelope, stone foundations and cellar, mortar, plaster, limewash, wooden battens and shingles, and windows makes it a significant example of this type of vernacular building. The construction of Nubrygyn Inn, both as a family home and as a rest stop for travellers, demonstrates skill in design and utilisation of locally available materials and workmanship, and resourceful detailing, all combining to provide a distinctive aesthetic achievement. The surviving garden elements and documented descriptions from the 1870s and 1880s provide evidence of the development of an English-style garden and orchard that was well known in the district.

The place possesses uncommon, rare or endangered aspects of the cultural or natural history of New South Wales.

Nubrygyn Inn and Cemetery is a rare example of an Inn that gained national media attention and notoriety after a robbery, hostage-taking and horse stealing event by Ben Hall, Johnny Gilbert, John Dunn and an unnamed conspirator.

The unusually long and continuous occupation of the Nubrygyn Inn and Cemetery by the Brazier family is of state significance, demonstrating a strong attachment to their adopted land. Nubrygyn Inn and cemetery is connected to the history of the Brazier family from the 1840s until the present, providing evidence of occupation by the Brazier family for over 165 years. The cemetery documents Brazier family history and their social networks with neighbours and workers, and also has wider significance as a reflection of the population health and social bonds in a small rural community of the mid to late 1800s, immigration patterns, convict history, ways of life and death and as documentary evidence of the prosperity and hardships of early settlement in the Central West.

The Nubrygyn Inn is a rare example in the Central West of a surviving relatively intact mud-brick building from the 1840s.

The place is important in demonstrating the principal characteristics of a class of cultural or natural places/environments in New South Wales.

Nubrygyn Inn is of state significance as a relatively intact representative example, located within an original landscape setting, of wayside inns that provided respite for travellers on the long and very rough roads between the isolated western settlements of the mid to late 1800s.
