= Clarence Robertson =

Clarence Robertson may refer to:

- Clarrie Robertson (Clarence Gordon Robertson, 1902–1974), Australian politician
- Herb Robertson (Clarence C. Robertson, 1951–2024), American jazz trumpeter and flugelhornist
