= Goyder Institute for Water Research =

Research institute in South Australia

Coordinates: 34°55′22″S 138°35′57″E

The Goyder Institute for Water Research (Goyder Institute) is a research alliance focused on the identification, development, and adoption of sustainable solutions for managing water in South Australia. Established in 2010 by the South Australian Government, the collaboration includes the Department for Environment and Water (DEW), the CSIRO, Flinders University, and Adelaide University (formerly the University of Adelaide, and the University of South Australia).

The Coorong, Lower Lakes and Murray Mouth (CLLMM) Research Centre was opened in Goolwa, South Australia in February 2024.

== Background ==
South Australia experienced a prolonged drought leading up to 2010, and there were serious concerns about fair distribution of water throughout the Murray–Darling basin. It was recognised that legislative changes were needed to the Commonwealth Water Act 2007. The South Australian Government provided new funding to for the establishment and operation of the Goyder Institute for Water Research (Goyder Institute) with the aim of improving water security in South Australia, and enhancing the capacity of the government "to deliver science-based policy and water management outcomes". The Goyder Institute for Water Research was established in 2010.

== Members and governance ==
Members of the research collaboration Goyder Institute for Water Research are the Department for Environment and Water (DEW), the CSIRO, Flinders University, and Adelaide University.

The Goyder Institute is governed by a board, comprising an independent chair; the director of the institute; and a representative from each partner organisation (DEW), CSIRO, and the two universities.

- Australian physicist Ian Chessell was the founding chair of the Goyder Institute in 2010, holding the position for five years.
- Barry Hart was chair for three years (2018–2023).
- Jody Swirepik (formerly Director of National Parks, within the Commonwealth department DCCEEW, and before that had worked for the Murray-Darling Basin Authority) was appointed in November 2023.

As of February 2024, the director of the Goyder Institute is Alec Rolston.

== The Coorong, Lower Lakes and Murray Mouth (CLLMM) Research Centre ==
Rebekha Sharkie, federal government MP for the Division of Mayo, approached finance minister Mathias Cormann in 2019 about funding a research centre in the region that includes the complex ecosystems of the Coorong, Lower Lakes, and Murray Mouth.

Starting in the 2022/23 financial year, the Australian Labor Government awarded A$8 million over four years to the Goyder Institute to work with local communities to investigate the effects of climate change on the Coorong, Lower Lakes and Murray Mouth (CCLLM) region. The funding was provided in order to create a new research centre in Goolwa, as well as a planned research program.

The Coorong, Lower Lakes and Murray Mouth (CLLMM) Research Centre was officially opened in early February 2024 by Rebekha Sharkie, attended by First Nations engagement officer Nathan Hartman, South Australian politicians Karen Grogan and David Basham, and others representing the Goyder Institute and local communities. An important part of the new centre is developing relationships with First Nations and other local communities, as well as industries, to gain input and new ideas of how to improve management of the area, in particular the Ngarrindjeri and Boandik peoples.

== Publications ==
The Goyder Institute has published its technical report series, comprising 5-10 issues per year, since 2011. They are published as electronic resources.

== Examples of projects ==
One early Goyder Institute research project was Facilitating Long-Term Outback Water Solutions, known as G-FLOWS. This project was focused on locating, defining, and quantifying groundwater resources in areas of South Australia earmarked as priority mineral prospecting zones, including the Musgrave Province, the north east and north west Gawler craton, parts of the Frome Embayment, and the northern Eyre Peninsula. Some of the impacts of this work were cited as:

- Reduced need for exploratory drilling for water and minerals (reduced cost and impact on communities and environment)
- Improved water security for remote Indigenous communities
- Opportunities for mineral exploration and economic development of the region (mining and the pastoral industry)
