= Inspector-General of Water Compliance =

Independent regulatory position in Australia

Inspector-General of Water Compliance of Australia
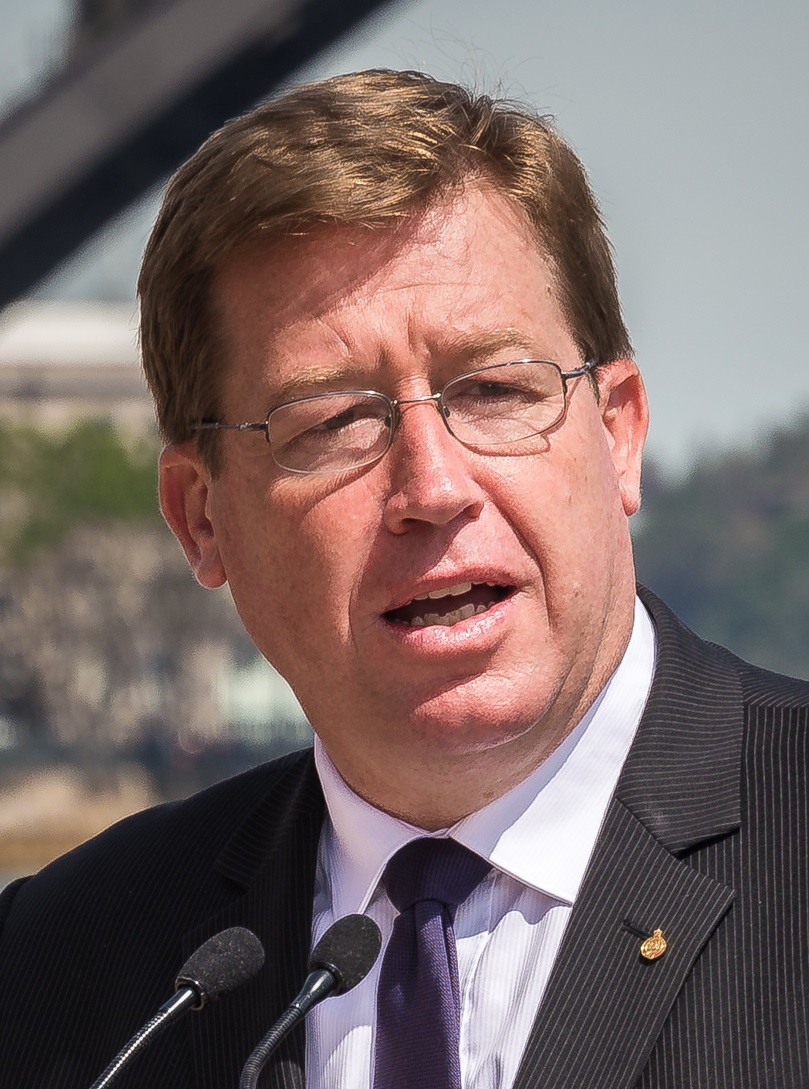
- Incumbent; Troy Grant since 5 August 2021
- Office of Water Compliance
- Style: The Honourable
- Type: Independent regulator
- Abbreviation: IGWC
- Formation: 5 August 2021
- First holder: Troy Grant
- Website: https://www.igwc.gov.au/

The Australian Inspector-General of Water Compliance (IGWC) is an independent regulatory position which has been held by the Hon. Troy Grant since 5 August 2021, the same date the position came into formation. It is one of three positions in the Office of Water Compliance, a part of the Department of Agriculture, Water and the Environment portfolio. The role was first proposed by former Water Minister David Littleproud in August 2019, with the position beginning as an interim from 16 December 2020 headed by Troy Grant up until its official formation.

The IGWC was formed as an independent regulator to ensure that the Murray-Darling Basin Authority and responsible state governments are complying with water requirements for the Murray-Darling basin under the Murray-Darling Basin Plan and Water Act 2007. Before its formation, water compliance was enforced by the Murray-Darling Basin Authority, a Commonwealth agency, but its powers have been since transferred to the IGWC which performs enforcement independent of the Australian Government. If responsible authorities for the Murray-Darling are deemed to be performing inadequately and are unable to come to agreements, the IGWC can enact an intervention through the Water Act 2007 or Minister for Resources and Water, as well as having the ability to refer issues to the Commonwealth Integrity Commission.

== Controversies ==
=== Appointment of Troy Grant and partisanship ===
On 16 December 2020, the Sydney Morning Herald reported on controversy surrounding Troy Grant being appointed as the Inspector-General, with state water ministers criticising it as they believed "a bipartisan appointment would better serve communities along the river system". The appointment also drew criticism from the ministers and NSW Nationals due to an apparent "lack of consultation", as well as Grant having been an ex-politician at the time. The former NSW Water Minister Melinda Pavey told SMH that "NSW was not consulted on this appointment, and we oppose it on the basis that in the interests of bringing basin states together we must appoint someone who is bipartisan".

== Notable events ==
=== Troy Grant as the Inspector General (2021–) ===
==== Troy Grant announces intent to enact Water Act intervention (2022) ====
On 2 June 2022, ABC News reported on Troy Grant's heavy criticism of the NSW Government in regards to its "failure to produce water resource plans", and went on to say that this "critical failure of the Murray-Darling basin plan" meant that water compliance "cannot be legally enforced". Grant had "told an audience in Mildura the Commonwealth government should use its 'step-in' powers under the Water Act to intervene if the situation continues" and that his first conversation with the federal Water Minister Tanya Plibersek would be on this matter. The NSW Water Minister Kevin Anderson responded to Grant's criticisms and said that he would be working with the Murray-Darling Basin Authority to solve the problems, and that he is "looking forward to meeting with the new Commonwealth Water Minister".
