= 2004 Dubbo state by-election =

Election result for Dubbo, New South Wales, Australia

A by-election was held for the New South Wales Legislative Assembly district of Dubbo on 20 November 2004. It was triggered by the death of Tony McGrane (Independent).

The by-election saw McGrane succeeded by another independent in Dawn Fardell.

== Background ==
On 15 September 2004, the independent sitting member Tony McGrane for Dubbo died after a battle with liver cancer. McGrane was first elected at the 1999 state election and re-elected at the 2003 state election. His death triggered a by-election for the vacant seat.

The by-election presented the National with an opportunity to regain the seat they had held for 18 years from 1981 before losing it to McGrane in 1999. However, the seat was won instead by another independent, Dubbo deputy mayor Dawn Fardell.

The by-election was not contested by the Labor, the party in government at the time. Nor was it contested by the opposition Liberal, who deferred to their junior coalition partner the National Party, as is typical in regional districts.

== Dates ==
Date	Event
1 November 2004	Writ of election issued by the Speaker of the Legislative Assembly and close of electoral rolls.
4 November 2004	Date of nomination
20 November 2004	Polling day
17 December 2004	Return of writ

== Results ==
2004 Dubbo by-election Saturday 20 November
Party	Candidate	Votes	%	±%
Independent	Dawn Fardell	19,511	50.56	+50.56
National	Jen Cowley	16,365	42.41	+4.19
Greens	Terrance Loughlin	1,390	3.60	+0.92
Independent	Makere Rangihaeata	1,326	3.44	+3.44
Total formal votes		38,592	98.50	+0.18
Informal votes		589	1.50	−0.18
Turnout		39,181	88.92	−5.20
Two-candidate-preferred result
Independent	Dawn Fardell	20,794	55.24	
National	Jen Cowley	16,847	44.76	
Independent hold		Swing	N/A	

== See also ==
- Electoral results for the district of Dubbo
- List of New South Wales state by-elections
