= Troy Grant =

Australian politician (born 1970)

The Honourable Troy Grant
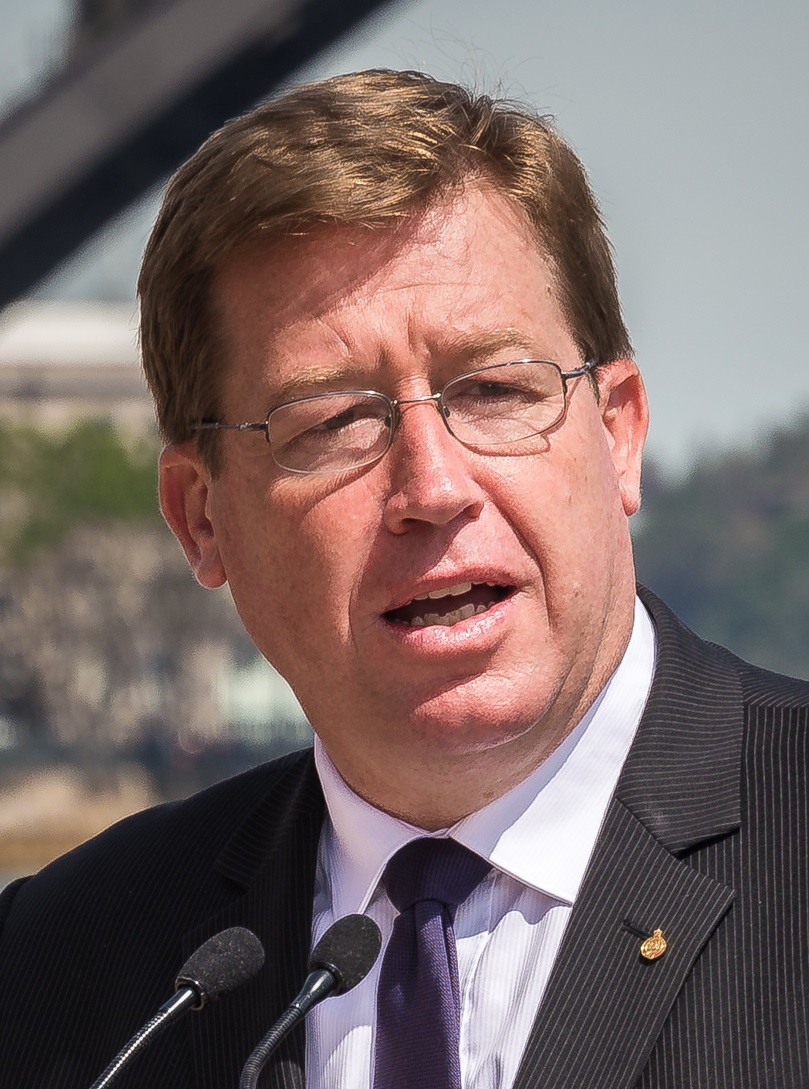
- Grant in 2014

Inspector-General of Water Compliance
- Incumbent
- Assumed office 5 August 2021

Minister for Police
- In office 2 April 2015 – 23 March 2019
- Premier: Mike Baird; Gladys Berejiklian
- Preceded by: Stuart Ayres (as Minister for Police and Emergency Services)
- Succeeded by: David Elliott (as Minister for Police and Emergency Services)

Minister for Emergency Services
- In office 30 January 2017 – 23 March 2019
- Premier: Gladys Berejiklian
- Preceded by: David Elliott
- Succeeded by: David Elliott (as Minister for Police and Emergency Services)

17th Deputy Premier of New South Wales
- In office 16 October 2014 – 15 November 2016
- Premier: Mike Baird
- Preceded by: Andrew Stoner
- Succeeded by: John Barilaro

Minister for Justice
- In office 2 April 2015 – 30 January 2017
- Premier: Mike Baird
- Preceded by: Brad Hazzard
- Succeeded by: portfolio abolished

Minister for the Arts
- In office 23 April 2014 – 30 January 2017
- Premier: Mike Baird
- Preceded by: George Souris
- Succeeded by: Don Harwin

Minister for Racing
- In office 2 April 2015 – 30 January 2017
- Premier: Mike Baird; Gladys Berejiklian
- Preceded by: himself (as Minister for Hospitality, Gaming and Racing)
- Succeeded by: Paul Toole

Member of the New South Wales Legislative Assembly for Dubbo
- In office 26 March 2011 – 23 March 2019
- Preceded by: Dawn Fardell
- Succeeded by: Dugald Saunders

Personal details
- Born: Troy Wayne Grant; 11 February 1970 (age 56) Maitland, New South Wales
- Party: Independent
- Other political affiliations: The Nationals (Until 2020)
- Spouse: Toni Grant
- Occupation: Police officer
- Website: www.troygrant.com.au

Troy Wayne Grant (born 11 February 1970) is an Australian politician and former police officer. Grant has been the Inspector-General of Water Compliance (IGWC) since August 2021, the first to hold the position. Previously, he was the Minister for Police and the Minister for Emergency Services from January 2017 until March 2019 in the Berejiklian government. He was a member of the New South Wales Legislative Assembly representing Dubbo for the Nationals from 2011 to 2019.

He is a former Deputy Premier of New South Wales and New South Wales Leader of The Nationals from October 2014 to November 2016. Grant was the Minister for Justice and Police, the Minister for Racing and the Minister for the Arts in the second Baird government, between April 2015 and January 2017. In April 2014, Grant was appointed as the Minister for Hospitality, Gaming and Racing and the Minister for the Arts in the first Baird government. Grant gained additional portfolio responsibilities in October 2014 and in addition to the above responsibilities in the two Baird ministries, he also served as the Minister for Trade and Investment, Minister for Regional Infrastructure and Services, and the Minister for Tourism and Major Events until 2 April 2015. Grant stood down as Nationals leader and Deputy Premier on 15 November 2016. He was Minister for Police until being replaced in that position by David Elliott on 2 April 2019. In March 2021, Grant was appointed chairman of International Rugby League, the world governing body for the sport of rugby league.

== Early years and background ==
A police officer for 22 years, Grant has twice been decorated with commendations for courage by the Commissioner of the New South Wales Police Force. He has implemented a number of community-based policing initiatives in Gilgandra and Brewarrina and he has received other awards, including the Premier's Public Sector Award. Grant led the criminal investigation into Catholic priest Father Vincent Ryan and has said "there is nothing I would not do in order to protect the children of NSW" from sexual abuse.

In 2020, Grant featured in the ABC documentary series Revelation, where he told Sarah Ferguson how he investigated and charged Vincent Ryan on allegations of child sexual abuse. Grant was also featured giving evidence at Ryan's 2019 criminal trial.

Grant can speak Wiradjuri, a language from inland New South Wales

== Political career ==
Grant was endorsed by the National Party as its candidate in Dubbo in June 2010, after a pre-selection battle with one other candidate, also a police officer. At the March 2011 elections, Grant was elected and received a swing of 14.5% in the traditionally strong Nationals seat, winning 63.7% of the vote on a two-party preferred basis. Grant actually won 60 per cent of the primary vote, enough to take the seat without the need for preferences. Grant defeated the incumbent independent politician Dawn Fardell, ending a 12-year hold by independent candidates. In accordance with electoral procedures, he resigned his commission as a police officer.

Due to the resignation of Barry O'Farrell as Premier, and the subsequent ministerial reshuffle by Mike Baird, the new Liberal Leader, in April 2014 Grant was appointed as Minister for Hospitality, Gaming and Racing, Minister for the Arts, and appointed as a member of Cabinet.

On 15 October 2014, Andrew Stoner stood down as Nationals leader and Deputy Premier, citing family reasons. On 16 October Grant was elected party leader and the following day he was sworn in as Deputy Premier of New South Wales, assuming the majority of Stoner's former ministerial responsibilities. Following a period of leadership speculation which came to a head on 12 November 2016 after the Nationals' poor performance at the Orange state by-election, on 14 November, Grant, facing a leadership spill, announced his resignation as Nationals leader and Deputy Premier, effective the following day.

Following the resignation of Mike Baird as Premier, Gladys Berejiklian was elected as Liberal leader and sworn in as Premier. The Berejiklian ministry was subsequently formed with Grant sworn in as the Minister for Police and the Minister for Emergency Services with effect from 30 January 2017. Grant did not seek re-endorsement for the 2019 state election.

On 21 March 2017, ABC News reported with a headline Mr Grant NSW Police Minister fined for using phone in car, says he didn't know it was illegal. The Daily Telegraph reported that Grant was a "...decorated former police officer..." and also that "Mr Grant, who has always tried to ram home road safety messages — including the dangers of using mobiles behind the wheel..."

In 2019, Grant's father was involved in a drink driving related death. He was sentenced to 23 months imprisonment.

On 16 December 2020, Grant took on the position as Interim Inspector-General of Water Compliance. Later, he became Australia’s first official Inspector-General of Water Compliance on 5 August 2021.

On 2 June 2022, ABC News reported on Grant's criticism of the NSW Government's "critical failure" in regards to its apparent "failure to produce water resource plans" for the Murray-Darling basin. With this, Grant had "told an audience in Mildura the Commonwealth government should use its 'step-in' powers under the Water Act to intervene if the situation continues" and said he would discuss the matter with Water and Environment Minister Tanya Plibersek. The NSW Water Minister Kevin Anderson announced that he would be working with the Murray–Darling Basin Authority to address Grant's comments, stating "I look forward to continuing to work with the Murray Darling Basin Authority to establish the most effective short and long-term solutions that will balance the needs of the environment, community and farmers while improving drought security".

== See also ==
- First Baird ministry
- Second Baird ministry
- Berejiklian ministry

New South Wales Legislative Assembly
| Preceded by Dawn Fardell | Member for Dubbo; 2011–2019 | Succeeded by Dugald Saunders |
Political offices
| Preceded by George Souris | Minister for the Arts; 2014 – 2017 | Succeeded by Don Harwin |
| Preceded by George Souris | Minister for Hospitality, Gaming and Racing; 2014 – 2015 | Succeeded by himself as Minister for Racing |
| Preceded by Andrew Stoner | Deputy Premier of New South Wales; 2014–2016 | Succeeded by John Barilaro |
| Preceded by Andrew Stoner | Minister for Regional Infrastructure and Services; 2014 – 2015 | Succeeded by John Barilaro as Minister for Regional Development |
| Preceded by Andrew Stoner | Minister for Trade and Investment; 2014 – 2015 | Succeeded by Stuart Ayres as Minister for Trade, Tourism, and Major Events |
| Preceded by Andrew Stoner | Minister for Tourism and Major Events; 2014 – 2015 | Succeeded by Stuart Ayres as Minister for Trade, Tourism, and Major Events |
| Preceded by himself as Minister for Hospitality, Gaming and Racing | Minister for Racing; 2015 – 2017 | Succeeded by Paul Toole |
| Preceded by Brad Hazzard as Minister for Justice | Minister for Justice; 2015 – 2017 | Succeeded by portfolio abolished |
| Preceded by Stuart Ayres as Minister for Police and Emergency Services | Minister for Police; 2015 – 2019 | Succeeded by David Elliott as Minister for Police and Emergency Services |
| Preceded by David Elliott | Minister for Emergency Services; 2017 – 2019 | Succeeded by David Elliott as Minister for Police and Emergency Services |
Party political offices
| Preceded by Andrew Stoner | Leader of the New South Wales National Party; 2014–2016 | Succeeded by John Barilaro |
