= Euchareena, New South Wales =

Euchareena
- Town
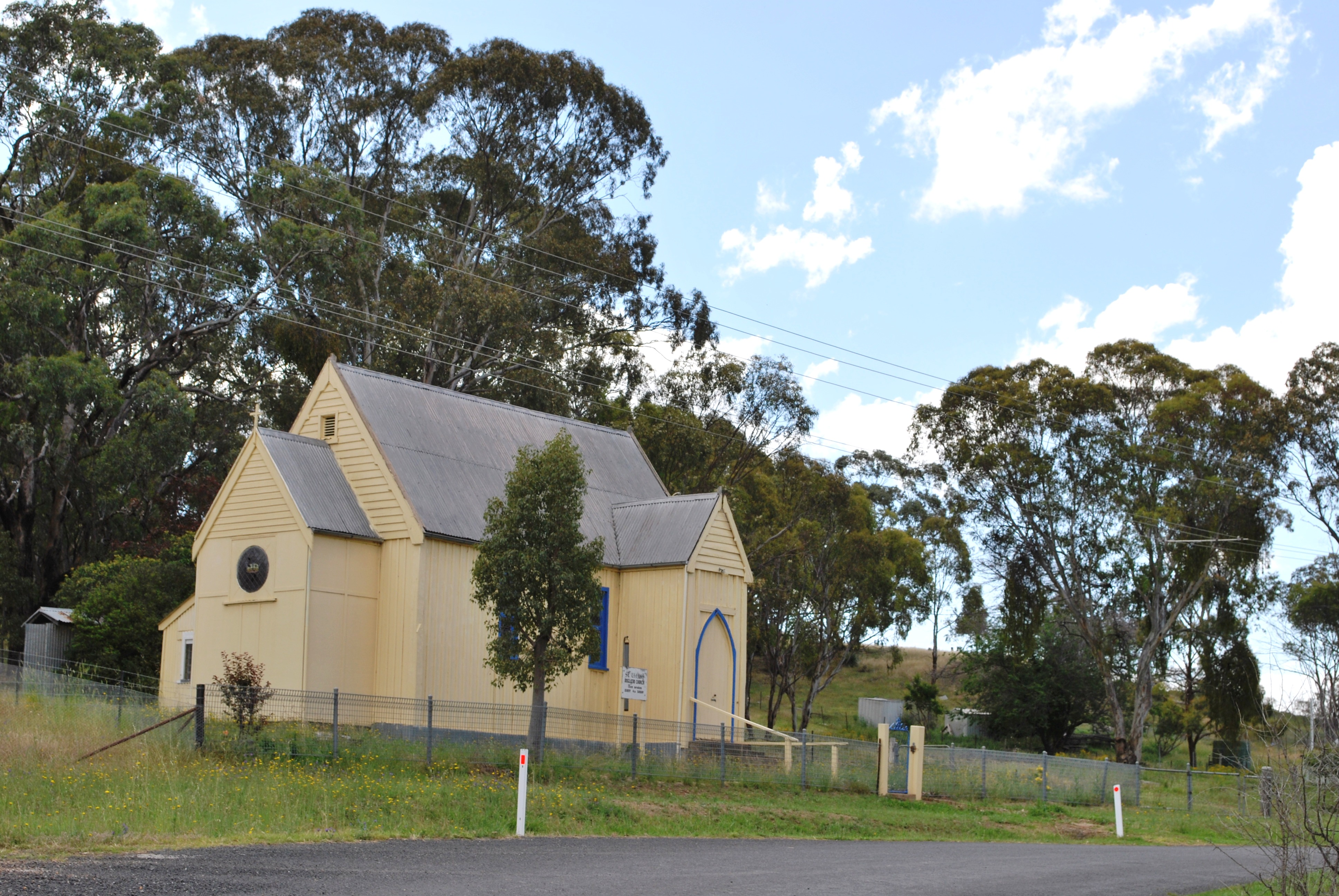
- St Thomas Anglican church

- Coordinates: 32°55′S 149°07′E
- Country: Australia
- State: New South Wales
- LGA: Dubbo Regional Council
- Location: 303 km (188 mi) NE of Sydney; 46 km (29 mi) N of Orange; 28 km (17 mi) NE of Molong
- Established: 1890s

Government
  - State electorate: Dubbo
  - Federal division: Parkes

Population
  - Total: 170 (2021 census)
- Postcode: 2866

Euchareena is a town in the Orana region of New South Wales, Australia. The town is in the Dubbo Regional Council local government area, 303 kilometres (188 mi) north west of the state capital, Sydney. At the 2021 census, Euchareena and the surrounding area had a population of 170.

It has a public school.

== Heritage listings ==
Euchareena has a number of heritage-listed sites, including:

- 2531 Euchareena Road: Nubrygyn Inn and Cemetery
