= Putta Bucca =

Putta Bucca New South Wales
- Coordinates: 32°34′44″S 149°34′52″E
- Population: 224 (2016 census)
- Postcode(s): 2850
- Location: 266 km (165 mi) NW of Sydney; 186 km (116 mi) NE of Orange; 3 km (2 mi) NE of Mudgee
- LGA(s): Mid-Western Regional Council
- State electorate(s): Dubbo
- Federal division(s): Calare

Putta Bucca is a locality in New South Wales, Australia. It is located about 3.4 kilometres (2.1 mi) north of Mudgee, on the Cudgegong River. In the 2016 census, it recorded a population of 224 people.
