= Wilbetree =

Wilbetree New South Wales
- Coordinates: 32°32′01″S 149°31′59″E
- Population: 29 (2016 census)
- Postcode(s): 2850
- Location: 289 km (180 mi) NW of Sydney; 190 km (118 mi) NE of Orange; 11 km (7 mi) N of Mudgee
- LGA(s): Mid-Western Regional Council
- State electorate(s): Electoral district of Dubbo
- Federal division(s): Calare

Wilbetree is a rural locality in New South Wales, Australia. It is located about 11 kilometres (6.8 mi) north of Mudgee. In the 2016 census, it recorded a population of 29 people.
