= John Mason (Australian politician) =

Australian politician

The Honourable Reverend John Mason

31st Leader of the Opposition of New South Wales
- In office 24 October 1978 – 29 May 1981
- Monarch: Elizabeth II
- Deputy: Bruce McDonald
- Preceded by: Peter Coleman
- Succeeded by: Bruce McDonald

Member of the New South Wales Parliament for Dubbo
- In office 1 May 1965 – 28 August 1981
- Preceded by: Les Ford
- Succeeded by: Gerry Peacocke

Personal details
- Born: John Marsden Mason; 20 November 1928 (age 97) Rose Bay, New South Wales, Australia
- Party: Liberal Party
- Spouse: Lorna Boxsell
- Children: 5, including Dave

John Marsden Mason (born 20 November 1928) is a former Australian politician, a member of the New South Wales Legislative Assembly for 16 years.

== Early life ==
Mason was born in Rose Bay in Sydney in 1928, the son of Kay Mason and Stella Marsden. After his secondary education at Sydney Boys High School, Mason gained a place to study theology at the University of Sydney while resident at St Andrew's College. Later, Mason studied at the Methodist Leigh College from 1949 to 1951 and later at the Melbourne College of Divinity in 1951.

Upon graduating from his theological studies, Mason became a Methodist minister and was first posted to Lismore in 1952, then the Northern Territory from 1953 to 1955, Goulburn from 1951 to 1958, Tighes Hill from 1958 to 1962 and then finally to Dubbo from 1962 to 1965. On 27 March 1953, he married Lorna Boxsell and together had a daughter and four sons. One of his sons, Dave Mason, was the lead singer of Australian band The Reels.

== Political career ==
Mason joined the Liberal Party and was elected as the member for Dubbo, a large rural seat in central New South Wales which had been vacant owing to the death of the sitting member Les Ford in 1964, in the New South Wales Legislative Assembly at the 1 May 1965 election with 62%, holding the seat until his retirement in 1981. Mason served on the backbench throughout the Askin government, later being appointed to the Zoological Board of New South Wales (1973–1975). When Askin retired, his successor as premier, Tom Lewis, appointed him as Minister for Lands and Minister for Forests on 30 June 1975. Mason served until Lewis was deposed by Sir Eric Willis on 23 January 1976. He was leader of the opposition (succeeding Peter Coleman) from 1978 till 1981.

On 1 January 2001 he was awarded the Centenary Medal.

New South Wales Legislative Assembly
Preceded by Les Ford	Member for Dubbo; 1965 – 1981	Succeeded by Gerry Peacocke
Political offices
Preceded by Milton Morris	Minister for Lands; 1975 – 1976	Succeeded by Col Fisher
Preceded by Milton Morris	Minister for Forests; 1975 – 1976	Succeeded by Col Fisher
Preceded by Peter Coleman	Leader of the Opposition of New South Wales; 1978 – 1981	Succeeded by Bruce McDonald
Party political offices
Preceded by John Maddison	Deputy Leader of the New South Wales Liberal Party; 1977 – 1978	Succeeded by Bruce McDonald
Preceded by Peter Coleman	Leader of the New South Wales Liberal Party; 1978 – 1981	Succeeded by Bruce McDonald
