= Gerry Peacocke =

Australian politician (1931–2013)

Minister for Local Government
- In office 6 June 1991 – 26 May 1993
- Premier: Nick Greiner; John Fahey
- Preceded by: David Hay
- Succeeded by: Garry West

Member of the New South Wales Legislative Assembly for Dubbo
- In office 19 September 1981 – 5 March 1999
- Preceded by: John Mason
- Succeeded by: Tony McGrane

Mayor of Dubbo
- In office 2004–2008

Personal details
- Born: June 2, 1931 Australia
- Died: May 23, 2013 (aged 81) Dubbo, New South Wales, Australia
- Party: National
- Occupation: Solicitor

Gerald Beresford Ponsonby Peacocke (2 June 1931 – 23 May 2013) was an Australian politician, elected as a member of the New South Wales Legislative Assembly.

A solicitor by profession, and a former city councillor, Gerry Peacocke was elected the National Party member for Dubbo, in 1981. He served as a Member of the Legislative Assembly for 17 years, before returning to local government, serving one term as Mayor of Dubbo.

During his parliamentary career, Peacocke served as a minister in the Greiner and Fahey Coalition Governments. During his time as a minister he had been touted as a possible Deputy Premier and National Party Leader but did not nominate for the National Party leadership when Wal Murray retired from these two positions.

Shortly after Murray was succeeded as Deputy Premier and National Party leader by Ian Armstrong in May 1993, Peacocke was one of three ministers (and the only National out of these three) to have been sacked by Premier John Fahey in a Cabinet reshuffle. Peacocke reacted adversely to his sacking and called Premier Fahey "a gutless little wimp . . . wide and shallow like a soup bowl" for not informing him beforehand of his sacking but this has been denied by Armstrong.

Peacocke died in his sleep on 23 May 2013.

New South Wales Legislative Assembly
Preceded by John Mason	Member for Dubbo; 1981–1999	Succeeded by Tony McGrane
Political offices
Preceded by David Hay	Minister for Local Government; 1991–1993	Succeeded by Garry West
