= The Molong Express and Western District Advertiser =

The Molong Express and Western District Advertiser

Molong Express - Covering Cabonne Shire, formally known as The Molong Express and Western District Advertiser, a weekly community newspaper published in Molong, New South Wales, Australia since 1876.

== History ==
The Molong Express was first published on 1 October 1876 by Henry Vale Leathem and promoted the cause of free trade. Leathem continued to publish the Molong Express until he died in 1879, after which it was published by his widow, Marion Leathem, and his sons.

The Molong Express faced competition from The Molong Argus which was first published in 1895 which adopted a protectionist viewpoint.

The Leathems continued to publish The Molong Express until 1933 when it was sold to Walter Pollard Stanger. Stanger also bought The Molong Argus in 1934 and shortly afterwards incorporated it into The Molong Express.

The Molong Express was owned by Norman Bloomfield from 1955 until his death in 2005.

The Express was purchased by Paul Mullins in 2006 and has been produced and published since then by Paul and his partner Rozzi Smith (Editor).

After a short publishing pause, in July 2026 ownership of the Molong Express - Covering Cabonne Shire passed to Grassroots Media who resumed publishing the paper on a weekly basis, each Wednesday.

== Digitisation ==
The paper has been digitised as part of the Australian Newspapers Digitisation Program project of the National Library of Australia.

== See also ==
- List of newspapers in Australia
- List of newspapers in New South Wales
