= Electoral district of Dubbo =

State electoral district of New South Wales, Australia

Dubbo New South Wales—Legislative Assembly
- Interactive map of district boundaries from the 2023 state election
- State: New South Wales
- Dates current: 1894–1904; 1930–present
- MP: Dugald Saunders
- Party: National Party
- Namesake: Dubbo
- Electors: 57,922 (2023)
- Area: 17,352.89 km^{2} (6,700.0 sq mi)
- Demographic: Provincial and rural
Electorates around Dubbo:
Barwon	Barwon	Upper Hunter
Barwon	Dubbo	Northern Tablelands
Orange	Orange	Bathurst

Dubbo is an electoral district of the Legislative Assembly in the Australian state of New South Wales. It is represented by Dugald Saunders of the National Party.

Dubbo is a regional electorate covering three local government areas, including all of Dubbo Regional Council, Narromine Shire, and the majority of Mid-Western Regional Council. Its major population centres are Dubbo, Narromine, Wellington and Mudgee.

== History ==
It was first created in 1894, abolished in 1904, and then recreated in 1930.

Dubbo has been generally conservative-leaning throughout its history, with the Country/National and Liberal parties holding it for most of its lifetime. The conservative bent grew even stronger during the 1980s and 1990s, and the seat was widely seen as National Party heartland. This changed in 1999, when Dubbo became one of a number of key National Party seats to fall to rural independents, with the narrow victory of Tony McGrane. He was returned with a much larger majority at the 2003 election, and when he died in 2004, another independent, Dawn Fardell, won the resulting by-election. Fardell was re-elected in the 2007 election, only to be comprehensively defeated by the Nationals' Troy Grant at the 2011 general election.

The city of Dubbo itself occasionally votes for Labor, and Labor did manage to hold Dubbo for three short stints between the 1930s and 1950s. However, Labor has not held the seat since 1959, and there is no prospect of Labor retaking it in the foreseeable future. Labor did not field a candidate in the 2004 by-election, and achieved 6.5% of the first preference votes at the 2011 general election.

== Members for Dubbo ==
First incarnation (1894–1904)
Member	Party	Term
James Morgan	Protectionist	1894–1895
Simeon Phillips	Free Trade	1895–1901
Simeon Phillips	Liberal Reform	1901–1904
Second incarnation (1930–present)
Member	Party	Term
Alfred McClelland	Labor	1930–1932
George Wilson	Country	1932–1942
Clarrie Robertson	Labor	1942–1950
Robert Medcalf	Country	1950–1953
Clarrie Robertson	Labor	1953–1959
Les Ford	Liberal	1959–1964
John Mason	Liberal	1965–1981
Gerry Peacocke	National	1981–1999
Tony McGrane	Independent	1999–2004
Dawn Fardell	Independent	2004–2011
Troy Grant	National	2011–2019
Dugald Saunders	National	2019–present

== Election results ==
2023 New South Wales state election: Dubbo
Party	Candidate	Votes	%	±%
National	Dugald Saunders	26,907	54.3	+16.9
Labor	Josh Black	10,859	21.9	+7.1
Shooters, Fishers, Farmers	Kate Richardson	7,035	14.2	+0.5
Legalise Cannabis	Mark Littlejohn	2,197	4.4	+4.4
Greens	Robyn Thomas	1,761	3.6	−0.1
Sustainable Australia	Anthony Nugent	785	1.6	+1.6
Total formal votes		49,544	96.9	+0.7
Informal votes		1,595	3.1	−0.7
Turnout		51,139	88.3	−1.2
Two-party-preferred result
National	Dugald Saunders	29,479	68.6	+0.5
Labor	Josh Black	13,515	31.4	−0.5
National hold		Swing	+0.5	

== Localities ==
Localities within the electorate of Dubbo include:

Apple Tree Flat, Apsley, Arthurville, Avisford, Bakers Swamp, Ballimore, Bara, Barneys Reef, Ben Buckley, Beni, Benolong, Beryl, Biraganbil, Birriwa, Bocoble, Bodangora, Bombira, Botobolar, Bournewood, Brocklehurst, Buckaroo, Budgee Budgee, Bundemar, Bungaba, Burroway, Burrundulla, Caerleon, Canadian Lead, Carcalgong, Collingwood, Comobella, Cooyal, Cope, Cross Roads, Crudine, Cudgegong, Cullenbone, Cumbandry, Cundumbul, Curra Creek, Dandaloo, Dripstone, Dubbo, Dunedoo, Elong Elong, Erudgere, Eschol, Euchareena, Eumungerie, Eurimbla, Eurunderee, Farnham, Frog Rock, Galambine, Geurie, Gin Gin, Gollan, Goolma, Goonoo Forest, Grattai, Green Gully, Gulgong, Guntawang, Hargraves, Havilah, Hayes Gap, Home Rule, Kains Flat, Kerrs Creek, Linburn, Loombah, Lue, Maitland Bar, Maryvale, Mebul, Medway, Menah, Meroo, Merotherie, Merotherie, Milroy, Minore, Mogriguy, Montefiores, Mookerawa, Mount Aquila, Mount Arthur, Mount Frome, Mount Knowles, Mudgee, Mullamuddy, Mumbil, Nanima, Narromine, Neurea, North Yeoval, Piambong, Ponto, Putta Bucca, Pyramul, Queens Pinch, Rawsonville, Riverlea, Spicers Creek, Spring Flat, St Fillans, Stony Creek, Stuart Town, Stubbo, Suntop, Tallawang, Tambaroora, Terrabella, Terramungamine, Tomingley, Toongi, Trangie, Triamble, Twelve Mile, Two Mile Flat, Ulan, Ullamalla, Walmer, Wambangalang, Wellington, Wilbetree, Windeyer, Wongarbon, Worlds End, Wuuluman, Yarrabin, Yarragal, Yarrawonga.
