= Les Ford =

Australian politician

Leslie Hunter Ford OBE (19 January 1917 – 17 December 1964) was an Australian politician. He was a Liberal Party member of the New South Wales Legislative Assembly from 1959 to 1964, representing the electorate of Dubbo.

Ford was born in Molong, and educated at Orange Public School and Orange High School. He worked on his father's grazing property at Amaroo until his father's death, whereafter he took over the property. He subsequently became a successful businessman, owning a machinery franchise, a car dealership, a number of butcher shops, and a range of pastoral property in the Dubbo area. He was an alderman on the City of Dubbo council from 1947 to 1964, serving as mayor from 1950. In 1956 Ford was appointed as an Officer of the Order of the British Empire.

Ford entered politics at the 1959 state election, winning the traditionally conservative Dubbo seat from the incumbent Labor member, Clarrie Robertson. He was easily re-elected at the 1962 election, but died in office in 1964. He was succeeded at the 1965 election by John Mason, who later became state Liberal leader. The main bridge across the Macquarie river in Dubbo, the LH Ford Bridge, is named in his memory.

New South Wales Legislative Assembly
Preceded by Clarrie Robertson	Member for Dubbo; 1959 – 1964	Succeeded by John Mason
