= Simeon Phillips =

Australian politician

Simeon Phillips (c. 1847 – 22 February 1925) was an Australian politician.

He was born in Parramatta to rabbi Solomon Phillips and Caroline Solomon. He worked as a jeweller before entering politics, and settled in Dubbo where he was an alderman (1880–99) and mayor (1883–91). In 1895 he was elected to the New South Wales Legislative Assembly as the Free Trade member for Dubbo. He served until his defeat in 1904. Phillips retired to Sydney in 1910 and died at Rose Bay in 1925.

New South Wales Legislative Assembly
Preceded by James Morgan	Member for Dubbo; 1895–1904	Abolished
