= Robert Medcalf =

Australian politician (1887–1963)

Robert George Medcalf (17 July 1887 – 9 June 1963) was an Australian politician, elected as a member of the New South Wales Legislative Assembly.

Medcalf was the member for Lachlan from 1947 to 1950 and the member for Dubbo from 1950 to 1953.

== Notes ==
New South Wales Legislative Assembly
Preceded by John Chanter	Member for Lachlan; 1947 – 1950	Succeeded by Seat abolished
Preceded by Clarrie Robertson	Member for Dubbo; 1950 – 1953	Succeeded by Clarrie Robertson
