= Dawn Fardell =

Australian politician (born 1947)

Dawn Fardell MP

Member of the New South Wales Parliament for Dubbo
- In office 20 November 2004 – 26 March 2011
- Preceded by: Tony McGrane
- Succeeded by: Troy Grant

Personal details
- Born: 14 September 1947 (age 79) Sydney
- Party: Independent
- Spouse: Leo Fardell (sep.)
- Children: 3
- Profession: Politician

Dawn Elizabeth Fardell (born 14 September 1947) is an Australian former politician who was an independent member of the New South Wales Legislative Assembly representing Dubbo between 2004 and 2011.

== Early years and background ==
Fardell was born Sydney and moved to Dubbo in 1977. She is married to a local businessman and has three adult children. Fardell was a Councillor for Dubbo City Council between 1999 and 2005.

== Political career ==
Following the 2004 death of independent Tony McGrane, Fardell was elected to represent Dubbo at the subsequent by-election. At the time, the by-election was seen as a test of the NSW Nationals, who had held the seat for 17 years prior to McGrane's election in 1999, while Fardell presented herself as "capable of working with any party and not having to toe the party line". Labor, which had not held the seat since 1959, did not field a candidate, and federal independents Peter Andren and Tony Windsor supported Fardell in her campaign. In the final result, Fardell picked up 49.3% of the primary vote, with 56% on a two-party preferred basis.

She was returned to office in the 2007 state election, winning 41.66% of the primary vote with both major parties once again running, and served as a member of parliamentary standing committees on public works and road safety. Fardell was defeated at the 2011 state election by the National Party candidate, Troy Grant, a local police inspector.

New South Wales Legislative Assembly
Preceded by Tony McGrane	Member for Dubbo; 2004–2011	Succeeded by Troy Grant
