= George Wilson (Australian politician) =

Australian politician (1895–1942)

George Alan Lachlan Wilson (28 March 1895 – 24 April 1942) was an Australian politician.

He was born at Balmain in Sydney to grazier Samuel Wilson and Mary Elizabeth, née Maclean. He was educated at Scotch College in Melbourne before returning to the family property at Lake Cowal near Forbes. He served in the Australian Imperial Force from 1916 to 1917 and lost a leg at the Battle of the Somme. From 1920 to 1930 he was a Bland Shire Councillor (president 1921–23, 1924–25). He married Freda Maud Stitt on 27 May 1926. In the 1930s he subdivided and sold his property and purchased an experimental immigration farm; politically he was a member of the Country Party and a co-founder of the Riverina Movement, advocating a new state in western New South Wales.

In 1932, Wilson was elected to the New South Wales Legislative Assembly as the member for Dubbo. He studied conditions in Europe and the Soviet Union in 1938 and was a member of the Commonwealth Liquid and Fuel Control Board from 1941 to 1942.

Wilson collapsed and died on 24 April 1942 while taking a bath at Parliament House, Sydney. His body was found in the bathtub by police the following day, after his wife reported him missing. His cause of death was given as "heart failure and diabetes"

New South Wales Legislative Assembly
Preceded by Alfred McClelland	Member for Dubbo; 1932–1942	Succeeded by Clarrie Robertson
