= Water Act 2007 =

Federal Australian legislation

Parliament of Australia
- Long title: An Act to make provision for the management of the water resources of the Murray–Darling Basin, and to make provision for other matters of national interest in relation to water and water information, and for related purposes
- Citation: No. 137, 2007 or No. 137, 2007 as amended
- Territorial extent: New South Wales, Victoria, Queensland, Australian Capital Territory and South Australia
- Enacted by: House of Representatives
- Assented to: 3 September 2007
- Administered by: Agriculture, Water and the Environment

Legislative history
- Bill title: Water Bill 2007
- First reading: 08 August 2007
- Second reading: 08 August 2007
- Third reading: 14 August 2007
- First reading: 15 August 2007
- Second reading: 15 August 2007
- Third reading: 17 August 2007
- Status: In force

The Water Act 2007 (Cth), is an act of the Parliament of Australia. It is Australia's primary legislation that concerns the Commonwealth Government's powers over the Murray–Darling Basin, and is administered by the Department of Agriculture, Water and the Environment. The act enables the Commonwealth to enforce compliance, enact intervention, and work with the Basin state governments (South Australia, New South Wales, Victoria, Queensland and Australian Capital Territory) to achieve the act's objectives which include the management of the Basin's water resources, addressing threats to the Basin, promoting the environmentally, economically and socially sustainable use of the Basin's resources, conservation of the Basin ecosystem, maximising the economic benefit to the Basin communities, and improving water security.

== Background ==
Up until the Act's introduction, the Murray–Darling Basin was under the sole jurisdiction of the Basin state governments. According to ABC News, the 2006-07 Murray–Darling drought was the main event that influenced (now former) Prime Minister John Howard to begin forming the Murray–Darling Basin Plan and subsequent Act, Howard having said that with "the prospect of long term climate change, we need radical and permanent change". The 2006-07 drought saw severe depletions of water resources, including of the Murray–Darling Basin.

On 22 February 2007, the Sydney Morning Herald reported that John Howard had "vowed to push with his $10 billion plan to take over the Murray–Darling river system despite the Victorian government putting up an alternative proposal". Howard had rejected the proposal saying it was "more of the same", and said he believed it was essential that the states "agreed to transfer powers over the Murray–Darling Basin to the Commonwealth". On 19 June 2007, The Age reported that the Bracks state government of Victoria was the only Basin state yet to sign for the transfer of power to the Commonwealth, and instead went on to propose investment into a desalination plant and a pipeline, which the Howard government had said "Commonwealth funding would not be provided for [the] north-south pipeline".

Some months after Howard announcing this commitment, the Water Bill was introduced into the Australian House of Representatives for a first reading on 8 August 2007. The second reading was moved on 8 August and agreed to on 14 August, and the third reading was agreed to on 14 August. It was then introduced into the Australian Senate for a first reading on 15 August. The second Senate reading was moved on 15 August and agreed to on 17 August, and the third reading was agreed to on 17 August.

== The Act ==
=== New entities ===
The Act constitutes the existence of the Murray–Darling Basin Authority, Murray–Darling Basin Ministerial Council, Basin Officials Committee, Basin Community Committee, and the position Inspector-General of Water Compliance (part of the Office of Water Compliance). These entities exist in varying mutual relationships of being consultative, advisory, directive or delegative, or recommending. The Commonwealth Water Minister is the ultimate decision-making authority under the Act.

==== Murray–Darling Basin Authority ====
The Murray–Darling Basin Authority ("the Authority") is an independent government agency that functions as the statutory body which creates the Basin Plan and provides recommendation to the Water Minister, as well as Basin education, monitoring and conducting research. Its members must consist of a Chief Executive, a Chair and an Indigenous individual, all of whom are appointed by the Governor-General of Australia.

The Authority is to:

1. Receive delegation from the Committee;
2. Receive advice from the Community Committee;
3. Receive directions from the Ministerial Council;
4. Consult the Committee, Community Committee, and Ministerial Council;
5. Provide advice to the Committee and Ministerial Council; and
6. Provide recommendation to the Commonwealth Water Minister.

==== Murray–Darling Basin Ministerial Council ====
The Murray–Darling Basin Ministerial Council ("the Ministerial Council") must consist of a Chair Minister (appointed by the Commonwealth) and a Minister for each of the 5 Basin states (appointed by their state governments). It is responsible for the consideration and determination of outcomes regarding "major policy issues" concerning the Basin states and Murray–Darling, and is responsible for the approval and amendment of annual corporate plans and similar plans.

The Ministerial Council is to:

1. Receive advice from the Committee, Community Committee, and the Authority;
2. Receive consultation from the Authority;
3. Delegate with the Committee; and
4. Provide directions to the Authority.

==== Basin Officials Committee ====
The Basin Officials Committee ("the Committee") is a committee that must consist of a Chair representing the Commonwealth (appointed by the Chair of the Ministerial Council) and five members each representing one of the 5 Basin states (appointed by their relevant Ministers in the Ministerial Council).

The Committee is to:

1. Receive delegation from the Ministerial Council;
2. Receive advice from the Authority and Ministerial Council;
3. Receive consultation from the Authority; and
4. Provide advice to the Authority and Ministerial Council.

==== Basin Community Committee ====
The Basin Community Committee ("the Community Committee") is composed of three subcommittees, the Irrigation Subcommittee, Environmental Water Subcommittee and Indigenous Water Subcommittee. It must consist of a Chair (who can be any committee member) and up to 16 other members, who should include "at least one Authority member", "at least 8 individuals who are water users or representatives of one or more water users" and "at least 2 Indigenous persons with expertise in Indigenous matters relevant to the Basin’s water resources".

The Community Committee and its subcommittees are to:

1. Receive consultation from the Authority; and
2. Provide advice to the Authority and Ministerial Council.

=== Resource management ===
Part 2 of the Act, "Management of Basin water resources", outlines the compulsory management plans that the Basin stakeholders (Basin states and Commonwealth) are required to form and enact, the requirements for said plans to be considered adequate, and the penalties and offences associated with inadequate planning. The Act requires that the stakeholders create a primary management plan covering the entire Murray–Darling (the "Basin Plan"), alongside more specific management plans for particular areas.

==== Basin Plan (primary plan) ====
The Act requires that the Basin plan created by the stakeholders includes a general plan, a water quality and salinity plan, and environmental watering plan. The Basin plan should:

1. Take into consideration any relevant international agreements;
2. Acknowledge and plan on "the fact that" existing use of the Basin has had, and may continue to have, adverse effects on ecosystem conservation and biodiversity;
3. Promote sustainability, ecosystem restoration and conservation, both in regards to the use of the Basin, and development around it;
4. Consider the ecological profiles of "key environmental sites" in the Basin (e.g. the Rasmar wetlands);
5. Use the "best available scientific knowledge and socioeconomic analysis";
6. Take regard for the National Water Initiative, economic uses and consumption, society and culture, Indigenous Australians, the effects of the Basin plan on other environments outside the Basin, and arrangements between Basin states;
7. Include specified "long-term average diversion limits" which must be sustainable, and that is defined in an appropriate matter, e.g. as a quantity of water per year or as a mathematical equation;
8. Identify the causes of water quality degradation in the Basin, and include objectives regarding water quality and salinity;
9. Formulate enforceable water trading and transfer rules based on the Basin's needs;
10. Specify methods of managing environmental water, including of existing water and of any additional water;
11. Consider the interests of water holders, owners of environmental assets, and water managers; and
12. Be published on the Murray–Darling Basin Authority's website in full (ensuring transparency).

The Act states that the Basin plan must be created, altered, prepared and presented by the Murray–Darling Basin Authority with consultation of the Basin states, the Basin Officials Committee, and Basin Community Committee.

== See also ==
- Murray–Darling Basin
- Murray–Darling Basin Authority
- Murray–Darling Basin Plan
