= Clarrie Robertson =

Australian politician (1902–1974)

Member of the New South Wales Parliament for Dubbo
- In office 6 June 1942 – 22 May 1950
- Preceded by: George Wilson
- Succeeded by: Robert Medcalf

Personal details
- Born: 9 April 1902 near Dubbo, New South Wales
- Died: 31 October 1974 (aged 72) Bondi, New South Wales
- Party: Labor Party
- Occupation: Rural worker, railway employee

Clarence Gordon Robertson (9 April 1902 – 31 October 1974) was an Australian politician and a member of the New South Wales Legislative Assembly between 1942 and 1950 and again between 1953 and 1959. He was a member of the Labor Party.

== Early life ==
Robertson was born at Dubbo, New South Wales and was the son of a butcher. He was educated to elementary level in Dubbo and, from the age of 14, worked as a rural labourer. He was employed by the New South Wales Government Railways in the mid-west of New south Wales between 1924 and 1942.

== State Parliament ==
Robertson was the endorsed Labor candidate for the seat of Dubbo at the 1941 election. Despite a resurgence in rural support for Labor at the election, Robertson was defeated by the incumbent Country Party member George Wilson by 159 votes. Wilson died 11 months after the election and Robertson won the resultant by-election. He retained the seat for Labor for 8 years but was defeated, during a general swing against Labor, at the 1950 election by Robert Medcalf the incumbent Country Party member for Lachlan. Medcalf's seat had been abolished by a redistribution. Robertson regained the seat in 1953 and retained it until he was defeated at the 1959 election by the Liberal Party's, Les Ford. Robertson joined the Country Party in 1961 in the expectation that he would be the party's candidate at the election held in March 1962. However, the party did not endorse a candidate and Robertson styled himself as the "Independent Country" nominee. He received 5% of the vote and retired from public life. He did not hold party, parliamentary of ministerial office. After leaving parliament he owned and managed a farm.

New South Wales Legislative Assembly
| Preceded by George Wilson | Member for Dubbo; 1942 – 1950 | Succeeded by Robert Medcalf |
| Preceded by Robert Medcalf | Member for Dubbo; 1953 – 1959 | Succeeded by Les Ford |
