= Murray–Darling Basin Authority =

Australian government agency in charge of managing the Murray-Darling Basin

- MDBA

Agency overview
- Formed: December 2008
- Preceding agency: Murray–Darling Basin Commission
- Headquarters: Canberra
- Employees: 321 (2016)
- Annual budget: A$280 m (2009–2010)
- Minister responsible: Murray Watt, Minister for the Environment and Water
- Agency executive: Andrew McConville, Chief Executive
- Parent agency: Department of Climate Change, Energy, the Environment and Water
- Website: www.mdba.gov.au

The Murray–Darling Basin Authority (MDBA) is the principal government agency in charge of managing the Murray–Darling Basin in an integrated and sustainable manner. The MDBA is an independent statutory agency that manages, in conjunction with the Basin states, the Murray–Darling basin's water resources in the national interest. The MDBA reports to the Minister for the Environment and Water, held since May 2025 by Murray Watt.

The MDBA was established under the Water Act 2007 (Cth), which was introduced by the Howard government as part of "A National Water Plan for Water Security". The Water Act 2007 was a response to the drought and the potential effects of climate change in Australia. The law aimed to fulfill Australia's obligations under the Ramsar Convention on Wetlands. The 2007 Act was substantially amended in 2008.

The Chief Executive of the MDBA is Andrew McConville who replaced Phillip Glyde and Dr Rhondda Dickson prior. The Chair of the MDBA is Daryl Quinlivan who replaced Sir Angus Houston after his four-year term as Chair expired in 2024.

Whilst the MDBA is a Commonwealth Government agency, an intergovernmental Murray–Darling Basin Ministerial Council (Ministerial Council) acts in an advisory role in preparing and implementing the Basin Plan by the MDBA. The Ministerial Council comprises the Commonwealth Minister for Agriculture and Water Resources (who also chairs the Council) and one minister from each of the Basin states (Queensland, New South Wales, Victoria, and South Australia) and the Australian Capital Territory. The Ministerial Council introduced the Murray–Darling Cap in response to the 1995 report titled "An Audit of Water Use in the Murray–Darling Basin".

== Role of the MDBA ==
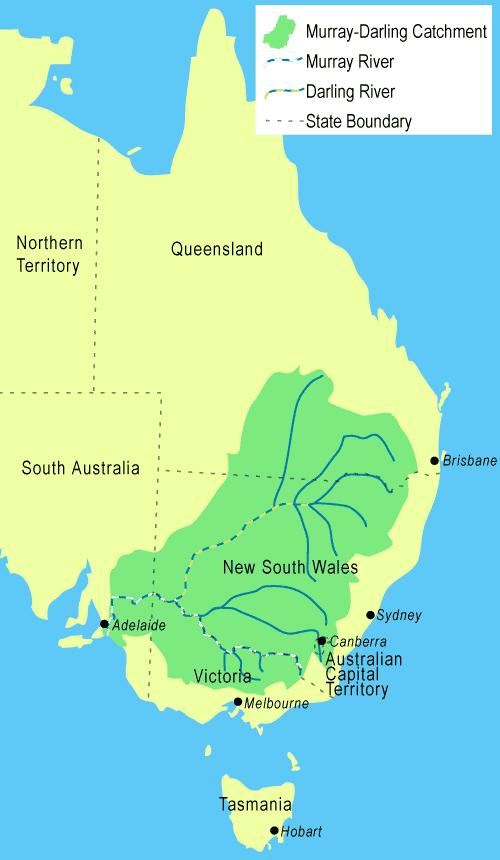
Map of the Murray–Darling Basin

With the creation of the MDBA in 2008, for the first time, a single intergovernmental body assumed responsibility for planning the integrated management of water resources of the Murray–Darling Basin. In addition to the Commission's former functions, the MDBA's role includes:

- preparing, implementing and enforcing the Murray–Darling Basin Plan
- advising the minister on the accreditation of state water resource plans
- developing a water rights information service which facilitates water trading across the Murray–Darling basin
- measuring and monitoring water resources in the basin
- gathering information and undertaking research
- educating and engaging the community in the management of the basin's resources.

The Murray–Darling Basin Authority is an integral element of the Australian Government's program Water for the Future which has four priorities; namely:

1. tackling climate change
2. supporting healthy rivers
3. using water wisely and
4. securing water supplies.

The MDBA also commissions research into aquatic science and is a source of information on Australian freshwater biology.

== History ==
Since 1914, there have been various intergovernmental agreements relating to Murray–Darling water resources. Prior to the formation of the Murray–Darling Basin Authority, institutional arrangements for water resources management lay with the five State and Territory governments in the Basin, with little co-ordination. In response to this problem, the Murray–Darling Basin Commission was established in January 1988 under the Murray–Darling Basin Agreement, with a charter to efficiently manage and equitably distribute River Murray water resources. Secondly, it was to protect and improve the water quality of the River Murray and its tributaries; and lastly to advise the Murray–Darling Ministerial Council on water, land and environmental management in the Basin. The controversial history of water allocation in the Basin and disputes between irrigators and environmentalists dates from the 1960s and is documented in the book, Cottoning on: Stories of Australian Cotton-growing by Siobhán McHugh (Hale and Iremonger 1996), which was shortlisted for the NSW Premier's History Prize in 1997. The Water Amendment Act 2008 was introduced in December 2008 to amend the Water Act 2007. This law transferred authority from the Murray–Darling Basin Commission to the Murray–Darling Basin Authority, creating an independent, expert-based body that would manage the Basin holistically for the first time.

As at November 2016, the MDBA is four years into the implementation phase of the Basin Plan. The MDBA has published major bodies of work, including:

- Basin environmental watering strategy
- Annual environmental watering priorities
- Constraints management strategy
- New water trade operating rules

The MDBA also established a water trading scheme across Basin states to increase water use efficiency.

In summer 2018–2019, there were substantial fish kill events in the Murray–Darling basin. A report released in January 2019 by the Productivity Commission found that "The MDBA has conflicting roles. It supports basin governments (as their agent) to implement the plan and is also required to ensure compliance with the plan. These conflicts will intensify in the next five years. The MDBA should be split into two separate institutions – the Murray-Darling Basin Agency and the Basin Plan Regulator."

== Murray–Darling Basin Plan ==
On 8 October 2010, the MDBA released a major document entitled the Guide to the Proposed Murray–Darling Basin Plan outlining a plan to secure the long-term ecological health of the Murray–Darling Basin. The guide introduced cutting existing water allocations and increasing environmental flows. The proposed plan was the first part of a three-stage process to address the problems of the Murray–Darling Basin; namely, over-allocation, prolonged drought, natural climate variability and climate change, leading to deterioration of rivers, wetlands, forests and floodplains in the basin.

The MDBA was responsible for preparing the Murray–Darling Basin Plan, which was released in November 2011. The Plan proposes that 2,750 gigalitres per year be cut from water allocations over seven years. The Plan was signed off by Tony Burke, Minister for Sustainability, Environment, Water, Population and Communities on 22 November 2012, and passed the Australian Parliament on 29 November 2012. The MDBA is responsible for overseeing the legally enforceable management Plan.

The main aim of the Basin Plan is to return around 2,750 gigalitres to the river system. The MDBA originally reported that the volume of water as high as 7,600 gigalitres per year would bring long-term sustainability and would be the best scenario for the ecosystems of the basin but "would not be socially or economically viable".

The Basin Plan sets and enforces environmentally sustainable limits on the quantities of water that may be taken from Basin water resources. It has Basin-wide environmental, water quality and salinity objectives and aims to develop efficient water trading regimes across the Basin. The plan includes requirements for state water resource plans and aims to improve water security for all Basin users. The Basin Plan aims to achieve a balance between environmental, economic and social considerations.

=== Objections ===
After the release of the Guide to the Proposed Murray–Darling Basin Plan there were a significant number of protests and voiced concerns in rural towns that the MDBA visited to present the proposed plan at consultation meetings. In Renmark, more than 500 people attended the Authority's first public consultation meeting in the local hotel that accommodated only 250 people. The draft plan proposed water buybacks of up to 35% in the Riverland area, forcing job losses and reduced flows to angry irrigators. Over 5,000 people attended a meeting in Griffith where the local Mayor, Mike Neville, said the plan would "obliterate" Murrumbidgee valley communities. Other groups also echoed this feeling, such as the Victorian Farmers Federation and the Wine Group Growers' Australia. At the same time, there was also support for the draft plan by various groups, including the Australian Conservation Foundation, and Environment Victoria.

In legal advice, dated 25 October 2010, from the Australian Government Solicitor, the Government's reading is that the draft plan must give equal weight to the environmental, social and economic impacts of proposed cuts to irrigation. Environmentalists and South Australian irrigators say the Authority should stick to its original figure. In October 2010, a parliamentary inquiry into the economic impacts of the plan was announced. While, in November 2010, the Authority announced that it might be forced to push back the release of its final plan for the river system until early 2012.

Less than one month later, Mike Taylor, then Chair of MDBA, announced his decision to resign effective from the end of January 2011. In announcing his resignation, he cited his concerns that the Water Act made it difficult to balance the environmental and socio-economic impacts of cuts to water allocations aimed at rescuing rivers in the basin. Of crucial concern was Taylor's desire to not oversee a process that returned less than 3,000 GL to the basin. Both the Prime Minister, Julia Gillard, and the Water Minister, Tony Burke, rejected Taylor's concerns that the Water Act and the objectives of the Authority were compromised.

In May 2011, the Wentworth Group of Concerned Scientists withdrew its support for the Basin Plan, and described the process as seriously flawed and a waste of taxpayers' money. The Wentworth Group said they could not support the Plan which they believed would cost billions and claimed that it would not fix the problems in the river system. The Wentworth Group wanted a minimum 4,000 gigalitres of water returned to the river system but the Group believed that it would not happen under the draft plan.

=== Water buybacks ===
In June 2011, a federal parliamentary committee (chaired by independent Tony Windsor) delivered its report to MDBA and its recommendations on water cutbacks in the basin. The committee was told river communities faced annihilation if 4,000 gigalitres was returned to the environment. The committee also reported that the health of the river system could be protected without the cuts. The Australian Conservation Foundation said it was disappointed by the report delivered by the inquiry into the Murray–Darling river system. The Foundation believed that buybacks were the most efficient way to save the basin.

According to the Wentworth Group, the Commonwealth Government originally planned to start buying the 2,750 gigalitres of water and to increase groundwater extractions by 2,600 gigalitres at the same time in March 2011. Much of the groundwater is linked to river systems, but the Plan does not count it in the models.:

The Plan does not incorporate in the modelling the impact that increasing groundwater extractions by over 2,600GL will have on surface water flows, many of the groundwater systems in the Basin are linked to river systems. The Plan [also] sets long term diversion limits on the assumption that there is no risk to river health from climate change.

— Wentworth Group Statement on the 2011 Draft Murray-Darling Basin Plan

In late May 2012, a revision of the plan was forwarded to state water ministers for review. It did not alter the recommendation to return 2,750 gigalitres of water to the environment by cutting water entitlements.

Following much negotiation between the Commonwealth and state governments and numerous submissions from interested stakeholders and the community, the Basin Plan finally became law in November 2012.

== Royal Commission into compliance with plan ==
In 2017, after claims that upstream states had not been complying with the Murray–Darling Basin Plan, South Australian Premier Jay Weatherill requested that the Federal Government undertake a judicial enquiry or Royal Commission to determine who was to blame for "water theft" and whether upstream states had been complicit. When the Federal Government rejected the request, Weatherill then launched a South Australian Royal Commission in January 2018 to investigate. The Weatherill Ministry fell in 2019, and then the Federal Government barred Murray Darling Basin Authority officials from giving evidence to the Royal Commission. The Commissioner, Bret Walker SC, also wrote to the new South Australian Attorney-General Vickie Chapman of the Marshall Ministry asking for an extension, but this was rejected.

The report into the Royal Commission was released 29 January 2019. Commissioner Walker was damning of the Murray–Darling Basin Authority's administration. He said that the process of setting sustainable limits to water extraction were "major failure of process", and that "The MDBA and the Commonwealth Government of the day can be seen not to have followed the plain requirements of the Water Act." (p24)

Subsequently other requests for an inquiry have been made, following mass fish deaths in the Darling River.

== See also ==
- Catchment Management Authority (New South Wales)
- Catchment Management Authority (Victoria)
- Coorong, Lower Lakes and Murray Mouth (CLLMM) Research Centre, a water research centre in Goolwa run by the Goyder Institute for Water Research
- River Basin Management Plans
