= Tony McGrane =

Australian politician

Anthony Michael McGrane (1 June 1946 – 15 September 2004) was an Australian politician.

McGrane was born in Forbes. He had a career in local government as a councillor in Gilgandra and Dubbo.

McGrane was elected in March 1999 as an independent, defeating the National Party candidate, Richard Mutton by 14 votes to represent the seat of Dubbo in the New South Wales Legislative Assembly. Dubbo had been the safest National Party seat in New South Wales. He was re-elected in March 2003 with an increased majority against the National Party's Mark Horton.

Diagnosed with liver cancer, McGrane died in Sydney in 2004.

He was succeeded in Parliament by independent Dubbo councillor Dawn Fardell.

New South Wales Legislative Assembly
| Preceded by Gerry Peacocke | Member for Dubbo; 1999–2004 | Succeeded by Dawn Fardell |
