= Askin–Cutler ministry (1973–1975) =

The Askin–Cutler ministry (1973–1975) or Sixth Askin ministry was the 67th ministry of the government of New South Wales, and was led by the 32nd Premier, Sir Robert Askin, of the Liberal Party in coalition with the Country Party, led by Sir Charles Cutler. It was the sixth and final occasion when Askin was Premier; and when Cutler served as Deputy Premier to Askin.

== Background ==
Askin was elected to the New South Wales Legislative Assembly in 1950 and served continuously until 1975, representing variously the seats of Collaroy and Pittwater. Rising through the Liberal Party ranks, Askin served as Deputy Leader from 1954 until he was elected Leader of the NSW Liberal Party and Leader of the NSW Opposition, following the defeat of the Morton/Hughes–led coalition by Cahill's Labor at the 1959 election. Cutler was elected to the NSW Legislative Assembly in 1947 and served continuously until 1975, representing the seat of Orange. Elected Deputy Leader of the Country Party in 1958 and, like Askin, Cutler was elected as leader of his party following the 1959 state election, replacing Davis Hughes. The Askin–Cutler led Liberal/Country coalition was defeated at the 1962 election by Labor's Bob Heffron. In April 1964 Jack Renshaw replaced Heffron as Leader of the Labor Party and became Premier. Twelve months later, Renshaw called an election held on 13 May 1965; however after 24 years of consecutive Labor governments, Askin and Cutler led the coalition to government at the 1965 state election.

The first Askin–Cutler ministry was commissioned from 1965 until the 1968 state election; when the coalition again won office. The second Askin–Cutler ministry was commissioned from the 1968 election until 11 February 1969, when the ministry was reconfigured. The third Askin–Cutler ministry was commissioned from the 1969 reconfiguration until the 1971 state election. The fourth Askin–Cutler ministry was commissioned from the 1971 election until 17 January 1973, when the ministry was reconfigured. The fifth Askin–Cutler ministry was commissioned from the 1973 reconfiguration until the 1973 state election. There were two vacancies in the ministry as a result of the resignation of Jack Beale, and the failure of Harry Jago to nominate for his seat before the closure of nominations.

The composition of the ministry was announced by Premier Askin on 3 December 1973, and covers the period until 3 January 1975, when Askin resigned as Premier and as Member for Pittwater. Tom Lewis succeeded Askin as Leader of the Liberal Party and Premier.

Portfolio	Minister	Party	Term commence	Term end	Term of office
Premier; Treasurer	Sir Robert Askin (Note: Retained portfolios from the fifth Askin–Cutler ministry.)	Liberal	3 December 1973	3 January 1975	1 year, 31 days
Deputy Premier; Minister for Local Government; Minister for Highways	Sir Charles Cutler	Country	3 December 1973	3 January 1975	1 year, 31 days
Minister for Education	Eric Willis	Liberal	3 December 1973	3 January 1975	1 year, 31 days
Minister for Planning and Environment; Vice-president of the Executive Council; Leader of the Government in Legislative Council	John Fuller, MLC (Note: John Fuller took on the expanded portfolio of Planning and Environment following the resignation of Jack Beale one month prior to the 1973 election.)	Country	3 December 1973	3 January 1975	1 year, 31 days
Minister for Public Works	Leon Punch	Country	3 December 1973	3 January 1975	1 year, 31 days
Attorney General	Ken McCaw QC	Liberal	3 December 1973	3 January 1975	1 year, 31 days
Minister for Transport	Milton Morris	Liberal	3 December 1973	3 January 1975	1 year, 31 days
Minister for Lands; Minister for Tourism	Tom Lewis	Liberal	3 December 1973	3 January 1975	1 year, 31 days
Minister of Justice	John Maddison	Liberal	3 December 1973	3 January 1975	1 year, 31 days
Minister for Agriculture	Geoff Crawford	Country	3 December 1973	3 January 1975	1 year, 31 days
Minister for Mines; Minister for Power; Assistant Treasurer	Wal Fife	Liberal	3 December 1973	3 January 1975	1 year, 31 days
Minister for Labour and Industry; Minister for Consumer Affairs	Frederick Hewitt, MLC	Liberal	3 December 1973	3 January 1975	1 year, 31 days
Minister for Health	John Waddy (Note: John Waddy took on the portfolio of Health following the failure of the Harry Jago to nominate for his seat prior to the 1973 election.)	Liberal	3 December 1973	3 January 1975	1 year, 31 days
Minister for Conservation; Minister for Cultural Activities	George Freudenstein	Country	3 December 1973	3 January 1975	1 year, 31 days
Minister for Decentralisation and Development	Tim Bruxner (Note: Tim Bruxner took on the portfolio of Decentralisation and Development, previously held by John Fuller.)	Country	3 December 1973	3 January 1975	1 year, 31 days
Chief Secretary; Minister for Sport	Ian Griffith	Liberal	3 December 1973	3 January 1975	1 year, 31 days
Minister for Housing; Minister for Co-operative Societies	Laurence McGinty (Note: Laurence McGinty was a new appointment to the ministry, taking on the portfolio responsibilities previously held by Tim Bruxner)	Liberal	3 December 1973	3 January 1975	1 year, 31 days
Minister for Youth and Community Services	Dick Healey (Note: Dick Healey was a new appointment to the ministry, taking on the portfolio of Youth and Community Services previously held by John Waddy.)	Liberal	3 December 1973	3 January 1975	1 year, 31 days

Ministers are members of the Legislative Assembly unless otherwise noted.

== See also ==
- Members of the New South Wales Legislative Assembly, 1973–1976
- Members of the New South Wales Legislative Council, 1973–1976

== Notes ==
Preceded by Fifth Askin–Cutler ministry 1973	Sixth Askin–Cutler ministry 1973–1975	Succeeded by Lewis–Cutler ministry 1975
