= Askin–Cutler ministry (1973) =

66th ministry of the New South Wales Government

The Askin–Cutler ministry (1973) or Fifth Askin ministry was the 66th ministry of the government of New South Wales, and was led by the 32nd Premier, Sir Robert Askin, of the Liberal Party in coalition with the Country Party, led by Sir Charles Cutler. It was the fifth of six occasions when Askin was Premier and when Cutler was Deputy Premier.

== Background ==
Askin was elected to the New South Wales Legislative Assembly in 1950 and served continuously until 1975, representing variously the seats of Collaroy and Pittwater. Rising through the Liberal Party ranks, Askin served as Deputy Leader from 1954 until he was elected Leader of the NSW Liberal Party and Leader of the NSW Opposition, following the defeat of the Morton/Hughes–led coalition by Cahill's Labor at the 1959 election. Cutler was elected to the NSW Legislative Assembly in 1947 and served continuously until 1975, representing the seat of Orange. Elected Deputy Leader of the Country Party in 1958 and, like Askin, Cutler was elected as leader of his party following the 1959 state election, replacing Davis Hughes. The Askin/Cutler–led Liberal/Country coalition was defeated at the 1962 election by Labor's Bob Heffron. In April 1964 Jack Renshaw replaced Heffron as Leader of the Labor Party and became Premier. Twelve months later, Renshaw called an election held on 13 May 1965; however after 24 years of consecutive Labor governments, Askin and Cutler led the coalition to government at the 1965 state election.

The first Askin/Cutler ministry was commissioned from 1965 until the 1968 state election; when the coalition again won office. The second Askin/Cutler ministry was commissioned from the 1968 election until 11 February 1969, when the ministry was reconfigured. The third Askin/Cutler ministry was commissioned from the 1969 reconfiguration until the 1971 state election. The fourth Askin/Cutler ministry was commissioned from the 1971 election until 17 January 1973, when the ministry was reconfigured following the resignation of Davis Hughes in order to take up a posting as Agent-General of New South Wales in London.

== Composition of ministry ==
The composition of the ministry was announced by Premier Askin on 17 January 1973, and covers the period until 3 December 1973, when Askin and Cutler led the Liberal/Country coalition to a sixth term following victory at the 1973 state election, defeating Labor led by Pat Hills.

Portfolio	Minister	Party	Term commence	Term end	Term of office
Premier; Treasurer	Sir Robert Askin (Note: Retained portfolios from the fourth Askin–Cutler ministry.)	Liberal	17 January 1973	3 December 1973	320 days
Deputy Premier; Minister for Local Government; Minister for Highways	Sir Charles Cutler	Country	17 January 1973	3 December 1973	320 days
Minister for Education	Eric Willis	Liberal	17 January 1973	3 December 1973	320 days
Minister for Decentralisation and Development; Vice-president of the Executive Council; Representative of the Government in Legislative Council	John Fuller, MLC	Country	17 January 1973	3 December 1973	320 days
Attorney General	Ken McCaw QC	Liberal	17 January 1973	3 December 1973	320 days
Minister for Transport	Milton Morris	Liberal	17 January 1973	3 December 1973	320 days
Minister for Public Works	Leon Punch (Note: Leon Punch was a new appointment to the ministry, replacing Davis Hughes.)	Country	17 January 1973	3 December 1973	320 days
Minister for Lands; Minister for Tourism	Tom Lewis	Liberal	17 January 1973	3 December 1973	320 days
Minister for Environmental Control	Jack Beale	Liberal	17 January 1973	3 December 1973	320 days
Minister for Agriculture	Geoff Crawford	Country	17 January 1973	3 December 1973	320 days
Minister of Justice	John Maddison	Liberal	17 January 1973	3 December 1973	320 days
Minister for Health	Harry Jago	Liberal	17 January 1973	3 December 1973	320 days
Minister for Mines; Minister for Power; Assistant Treasurer	Wal Fife	Liberal	17 January 1973	3 December 1973	320 days
Minister for Labor and Industry	Frederick Hewitt, MLC	Liberal	17 January 1973	3 December 1973	320 days
Minister for Youth and Community Services	John Waddy	Liberal	17 January 1973	3 December 1973	320 days
Minister for Conservation; Minister for Cultural Activities	George Freudenstein	Country	17 January 1973	3 December 1973	320 days
Minister for Housing; Minister for Co-operative Societies	Tim Bruxner (Note: Tim Bruxner was a new appointment to the ministry, replacing Stanley Stephens.)	Country	17 January 1973	3 December 1973	320 days
Chief Secretary; Minister for Sport	Ian Griffith	Liberal	17 January 1973	3 December 1973	320 days

Ministers are members of the Legislative Assembly unless otherwise noted.

== See also ==
- Members of the New South Wales Legislative Assembly, 1971–1973
- Members of the New South Wales Legislative Council, 1970–1973

== Notes ==
Preceded by Fourth Askin–Cutler ministry 1971–1973	Fifth Askin–Cutler ministry 1973	Succeeded by Sixth Askin–Cutler ministry 1973–1975
