= Askin–Cutler ministry (1971–1973) =

65th New South Wales government, led by Bob Askin

The Askin–Cutler ministry (1971–1973) or Fourth Askin ministry was the 65th ministry of the New South Wales Government, and was led by the 32nd Premier, Bob Askin, of the Liberal Party in coalition with the Country Party, led by Charles Cutler. It was the fourth of six occasions when Askin was Premier; and when Cutler was Deputy Premier.

== Background ==
Askin was elected to the New South Wales Legislative Assembly in 1950 and served continuously up until 1975, representing variously the seats of Collaroy and Pittwater. Rising through the Liberal Party ranks, Askin served as Deputy Leader from 1954 until he was elected Leader of the NSW Liberal Party and Leader of the NSW Opposition, following the defeat of the Morton/Hughes–led coalition by Cahill's Labor at the 1959 election. Cutler was elected to the NSW Legislative Assembly in 1947 and served continuously up until 1975, representing the seat of Orange. Elected Deputy Leader of the Country Party in 1958 and, like Askin, Cutler was elected as leader of his party following the 1959 state election, replacing Davis Hughes. The Askin–Cutler–led Liberal/Country coalition was defeated at the 1962 election by Labor's Bob Heffron. In April 1964 Jack Renshaw replaced Heffron as Leader of the Labor Party and became Premier. Twelve months later, Renshaw called an election held on 13 May 1965; however after 24 years of consecutive Labor governments, Askin and Cutler led the coalition to government at the 1965 state election.

The first Askin–Cutler ministry was commissioned from 1965 until the 1968 state election; when the coalition again won office. The second Askin–Cutler ministry was commissioned from the 1968 election until 11 February 1969, when the ministry was reconfigured. The third Askin–Cutler ministry was commissioned from the 1969 reconfiguration until the 1971 state election.

== Composition of ministry ==
The composition of the ministry was announced by Premier Askin on 11 March 1971. There was a re-suffle on 19 June 1972 when Pat Morton resigned from the ministry and from Parliament, with Cutler taking on his portfolios of local government and highways and consequent changes. Cutler's portfolio of science was abolished, the portfolio of tourism and sport was split, while the portfolio of power was established.

During the term of this ministry on 14 December 1971, Askin changed his name by Deed Poll from Robin William Askin to Robert William Askin and on 1 January 1972, he was appointed a Knight Commander of the Order of St Michael and St George. The following year, on 1 January 1973, Charles Cutler was also appointed a Knight Commander of the Order of the British Empire.

This ministry covers the period until 17 January 1973, when Askin and Cutler reconfigured the Liberal/Country ministry following the resignation of Davis Hughes in order to take up a posting as Agent-General for New South Wales in London.

Portfolio	Minister	Party	Term commence	Term end	Term of office
Premier; Treasurer	Sir Robert Askin (Note: Retained portfolios from the third Askin–Cutler ministry.)	Liberal	11 March 1971	17 January 1973	1 year, 312 days
Deputy Premier	Sir Charles Cutler (Note: Pat Morton resigned from the ministry and from Parliament, effective 19 June 1972. Sir Charles Cutler took on Morton's former portfolios of Local Government and Highways, retaining his role as Deputy Premier. The portfolio of science was abolished.)	Country	11 March 1971	17 January 1973	1 year, 312 days
Minister for Science	Sir Charles Cutler	Country	11 March 1971	19 June 1972	1 year, 100 days
Minister for Education	Sir Charles Cutler	Country	11 March 1971	19 June 1972	1 year, 100 days
Minister for Education	Eric Willis (Note: Eric Willis took on the portfolio of education from Sir Charles Cutler, relinquishing Chief Secretary, tourism and sport.)	Liberal	19 June 1972	17 January 1973	212 days
Chief Secretary	Eric Willis	Liberal	11 March 1971	19 June 1972	1 year, 100 days
Chief Secretary	Ian Griffith (Note: Ian Griffith was a new appointment to the ministry, taking on the residual parts of Willis' portfolios of chief secretary and sport.)	Liberal	19 June 1972	17 January 1973	212 days
Minister for Tourism and Sport	Eric Willis	Liberal	11 March 1971	19 June 1972	1 year, 100 days
Minister for Tourism	Tom Lewis (Note: Tom Lewis took on part of Eric Willis' former portfolio of tourism, retaining the portfolio of lands.)	Liberal	19 June 1972	17 January 1973	212 days
Minister for Sport	Ian Griffith	Liberal	19 June 1972	17 January 1973	212 days
Minister for Decentralisation and Development; Vice-president of the Executive Council; Representative of the Government in Legislative Council	John Fuller, MLC	Country	11 March 1971	17 January 1973	1 year, 312 days
Minister for Public Works	Davis Hughes	Country	11 March 1971	17 January 1973	1 year, 312 days
Attorney General	Ken McCaw QC (Note: The Attorney General, Ken McCaw, was appointed a Queen's Counsel in 1972.)	Liberal	11 March 1971	17 January 1973	1 year, 312 days
Minister for Local Government; Minister for Highways	Pat Morton	Liberal	11 March 1971	19 June 1972	1 year, 100 days
Minister for Local Government; Minister for Highways	Sir Charles Cutler	Country	19 June 1972	17 January 1973	212 days
Minister for Transport	Milton Morris	Liberal	11 March 1971	17 January 1973	1 year, 312 days
Minister for Lands	Tom Lewis	Liberal	11 March 1971	17 January 1973	1 year, 312 days
Minister for Environmental Control	Jack Beale	Liberal	11 March 1971	17 January 1973	1 year, 312 days
Minister for Agriculture	Geoff Crawford	Country	11 March 1971	17 January 1973	1 year, 312 days
Minister for Housing; Minister for Co-operative Societies	Stanley Stephens	Country	11 March 1971	17 January 1973	1 year, 312 days
Minister of Justice	John Maddison	Liberal	11 March 1971	17 January 1973	1 year, 312 days
Minister for Health	Harry Jago	Liberal	11 March 1971	17 January 1973	1 year, 312 days
Minister for Mines	Wal Fife (Note: Wal Fife retained the portfolio of mines, was allocated the new portfolio of power and took on George Freudenstein's former portfolio of Assistant Treasurer. Freudenstein replaced Fife as Minister for Conservation.)	Liberal	11 March 1971	17 January 1973	1 year, 312 days
Minister for Power	Wal Fife	Liberal	19 June 1972	17 January 1973	212 days
Minister for Conservation	Wal Fife	Liberal	11 March 1971	19 June 1972	1 year, 100 days
Minister for Conservation	George Freudenstein (Note: George Freudenstein retained the portfolio of cultural affairs, and took on Wal Fife's former portfolio of Conservation. Fife replaced Freudenstein as Assistant Treasurer.)	Country	19 June 1972	17 January 1973	212 days
Assistant Treasurer	George Freudenstein	Country	11 March 1971	19 June 1972	1 year, 100 days
Assistant Treasurer	Wal Fife	Liberal	19 June 1972	17 January 1973	212 days
Minister for Labour and Industry	Frederick Hewitt, MLC	Liberal	11 March 1971	17 January 1973	1 year, 312 days
Minister for Child Welfare; Minister for Social Welfare	John Waddy	Liberal	11 March 1971	17 January 1973	1 year, 312 days
Minister for Cultural Activities	George Freudenstein	Country	11 March 1971	17 January 1973	1 year, 312 days

Ministers are members of the Legislative Assembly unless otherwise noted.

== See also ==
- Members of the New South Wales Legislative Assembly, 1971–1973
- Members of the New South Wales Legislative Council, 1970–1973

== Notes ==
Preceded by Third Askin–Cutler ministry 1969–1971	Fourth Askin–Cutler ministry 1971–1973	Succeeded by Fifth Askin–Cutler ministry 1973
