= Askin–Cutler ministry =

Askin–Cutler ministry may refer to several periods of New South Wales government:

- Askin–Cutler ministry (1965–1968)
- Askin–Cutler ministry (1968–1969)
- Askin–Cutler ministry (1969–1971)
- Askin–Cutler ministry (1971–1973)
- Askin–Cutler ministry (1973)
- Askin–Cutler ministry (1973–1975)
