= Minister for Youth (New South Wales) =

Government minister in New South Wales, Australia

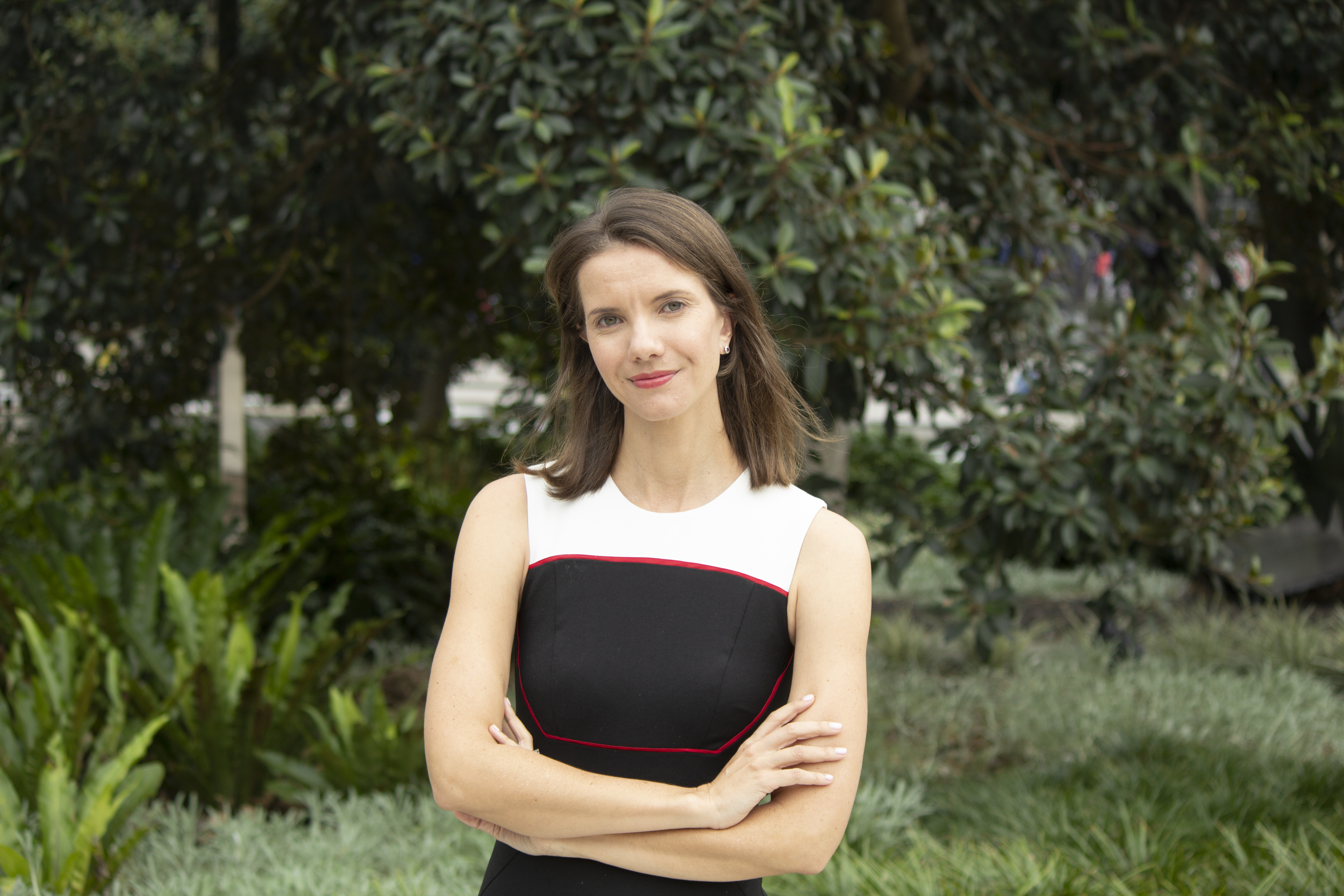
- Incumbent; Rose Jackson since 5 April 2023
- Department of Communities and Justice; Department of Primary Industries and Regional Development
- Style: The Honourable
- Appointer: Governor of New South Wales
- Inaugural holder: Frank Hawkins (as Minister for Child Welfare)
- Formation: 15 March 1956

The Minister for Youth is a minister in the New South Wales Government with responsibility for providing a whole-of-government approach to youth issues in New South Wales, Australia. The current minister is Rose Jackson.

It was first established in 1956 as the Minister for Child Welfare in the third ministry of Joe Cahill, with the principal responsibility being the care of neglected, orphaned and delinquent children through the Child welfare department. The department had existed since 1881 initially under the Colonial Secretary. The portfolio was held in conjunction with that of Social Welfare until 1973 when they were combined as the portfolio of Youth and Community Services. Youth Affairs were part of the responsibilities of the Minister for Education from 1988 until 1995 when a separate portfolio was re-created as the Minister Assisting the Premier on Youth Affairs. The youth portfolio was abolished in 2011. A new portfolio of regional youth was established in 2019.

== List of ministers ==
The following individuals have been appointed Minister for Youth or any precedent titles:

Title	Minister	Party	Ministry	Term start	Term end	Time in office	Notes
Minister for Child Welfare; Minister for Social Welfare	Frank Hawkins	Labor	Cahill (3) (4); Heffron (1) (2); Renshaw	15 March 1956	13 May 1965	9 years, 59 days	
Minister for Child Welfare; Minister for Social Welfare	Arthur Bridges	Liberal	Askin (1)	13 May 1965	22 May 1968	3 years, 9 days	
Minister for Child Welfare; Minister for Social Welfare	Harry Jago	Liberal	Askin (2)	23 May 1968	3 September 1968	103 days	
Minister for Child Welfare; Minister for Social Welfare	Frederick Hewitt	Liberal	Askin (2) (3)	3 September 1968	11 March 1971	2 years, 189 days	
Minister for Child Welfare; Minister for Social Welfare	John Lloyd Waddy	Liberal	Askin (4)	11 March 1971	17 January 1973	1 year, 312 days	
Minister for Youth and Community Services	John Lloyd Waddy	Liberal	Askin (5)	17 January 1973	3 December 1973	320 days	
Minister for Youth and Community Services	Dick Healey	Liberal	Askin (6)	3 December 1973	3 January 1975	1 year, 31 days	
Minister for Youth, Ethnic and Community Affairs	Steve Mauger	Liberal	Lewis (1) (2)	3 January 1975	23 January 1976	1 year, 20 days	
Minister for Youth, Ethnic and Community Affairs	Jim Clough	Liberal	Willis	23 January 1976	14 May 1976	112 days	
Minister for Youth and Community Services	Rex Jackson	Labor	Wran (1) (2) (3)	14 May 1976	2 October 1981	5 years, 141 days	
Minister for Youth and Community Services	Kevin Stewart	Labor	Wran (4)	2 October 1981	1 February 1983	1 year, 122 days	
Minister for Youth and Community Services	Frank Walker	Labor	Wran (5) (6) (7)	1 February 1983	6 February 1986	3 years, 5 days	
Minister for Youth and Community Services	Peter Anderson	Labor	Wran (8)	6 February 1986	4 July 1986	148 days	
Minister for Youth and Community Services	John Aquilina	Labor	Unsworth	4 July 1986	25 March 1988	1 year, 265 days	
Minister for Education and Youth Affairs	Terry Metherell	Liberal	Greiner (1)	25 March 1988	20 July 1990	2 years, 117 days	
Minister for School Education and Youth Affairs	Virginia Chadwick	Liberal	Greiner (1) (2); Fahey (1) (2)	24 July 1990	26 May 1993	2 years, 306 days	
Minister for Education, Training and Youth Affairs	Virginia Chadwick	Liberal	Fahey (3)	26 May 1993	4 April 1995	1 year, 313 days	
Minister Assisting the Premier on Youth Affairs	John Aquilina	Labor	Carr (1) (2)	26 July 1995	8 April 1999	3 years, 256 days	
Minister Assisting the Premier on Youth Affairs	Carmel Tebbutt	Labor	Carr (3)	8 April 1999	2 April 2003	3 years, 359 days	
Minister for Youth	Carmel Tebbutt	Labor	Carr (4)	2 April 2003	21 January 2005	1 year, 294 days	
Minister for Youth	Reba Meagher	Labor	Iemma (1)	21 January 2005	2 April 2007	2 years, 71 days	
Minister for Youth	Linda Burney	Labor	Iemma (2)	2 April 2007	8 September 2008	1 year, 159 days	
Minister for Youth	Graham West	Labor	Rees	8 September 2008	8 December 2009	1 year, 91 days	
Minister for Youth	Peter Primrose	Labor	Keneally	8 December 2009	28 March 2011	1 year, 110 days	
Minister for Mental Health, Regional Youth and Women	Bronnie Taylor	National	Berejiklian (2); Perrottet (1)	2 April 2019	21 December 2021	2 years, 263 days	
Minister for Regional Youth	Ben Franklin	National	Perrottet (2)	21 December 2021	28 March 2023	1 year, 97 days	
Minister for Education and Early Learning	Prue Car	Labor	Minns	28 March 2023	5 April 2023	8 days	
Minister for Youth	Rose Jackson	Labor	Minns	5 April 2023	incumbent	3 years, 155 days	

== See also ==
- Minister for Youth (Australia)
  - Minister for Youth (Victoria)
  - Minister for Youth (Western Australia)
