= Askin–Cutler ministry (1969–1971) =

The Askin–Cutler ministry (1969–1971) or Third Askin ministry was the 64th ministry of the Government of New South Wales, and was led by the 32nd Premier, Bob Askin, of the Liberal Party in coalition with the Country Party, led by Charles Cutler. It was the third of six occasions when Askin was Premier; and when Cutler was Deputy Premier.

== Background ==
Askin was elected to the New South Wales Legislative Assembly in 1950 and served continuously until 1975, representing variously the seats of Collaroy and Pittwater. Rising through the Liberal Party ranks, Askin served as Deputy Leader from 1954 until he was elected Leader of the NSW Liberal Party and Leader of the NSW Opposition, following the defeat of the Morton/Hughes–led coalition by Cahill's Labor at the 1959 election. Cutler was elected to the NSW Legislative Assembly in 1947 and served continuously until 1975, representing the seat of Orange. Elected Deputy Leader of the Country Party in 1958 and, like Askin, Cutler was elected as leader of his party following the 1959 state election, replacing Davis Hughes. The Askin–Cutler led Liberal/Country coalition was defeated at the 1962 election by Labor's Bob Heffron. In April 1964 Jack Renshaw replaced Heffron as Leader of the Labor Party and became Premier. Twelve months later, Renshaw called an election held on 13 May 1965; however after 24 years of consecutive Labor governments, Askin and Cutler led the coalition to government at the 1965 state election.

The first Askin–Cutler ministry was commissioned from 1965 until the 1968 state election; when the coalition again won office. The second Askin–Cutler ministry was commissioned from the 1968 election until 11 February 1969, when the ministry was reconfigured.

== Composition of ministry ==
This ministry covers the period from 11 February 1969 until 11 March 1971, when Askin and Cutler led the Liberal/Country coalition to a fourth term following victory at the 1971 state election, defeating Labor led by Pat Hills.

Portfolio	Minister	Party	Term commence	Term end	Term of office
Premier; Treasurer	Bob Askin (Note: Retained portfolios from the second Askin–Cutler ministry.)	Liberal	11 February 1969	11 March 1971	2 years, 28 days
Deputy Premier; Minister for Education; Minister for Science	Charles Cutler	Country	11 February 1969	11 March 1971	2 years, 28 days
Minister for Labour and Industry; Chief Secretary; Minister for Tourism	Eric Willis	Liberal	11 February 1969	11 March 1971	2 years, 28 days
Minister for Decentralisation and Development; Vice-president of the Executive Council; Representative of the Government in Legislative Council	John Fuller, MLC	Country	11 February 1969	11 March 1971	2 years, 28 days
Minister for Public Works	Davis Hughes	Country	11 February 1969	11 March 1971	2 years, 28 days
Attorney General	Ken McCaw	Liberal	11 February 1969	11 March 1971	2 years, 28 days
Minister for Local Government; Minister for Highways	Pat Morton	Liberal	11 February 1969	11 March 1971	2 years, 28 days
Minister for Transport	Milton Morris	Liberal	11 February 1969	11 March 1971	2 years, 28 days
Minister for Lands	Tom Lewis	Liberal	11 February 1969	11 March 1971	2 years, 28 days
Minister for Conservation	Jack Beale	Liberal	11 February 1969	11 March 1971	2 years, 28 days
Minister for Agriculture	Geoff Crawford	Country	11 February 1969	11 March 1971	2 years, 28 days
Minister for Housing; Minister for Co-operative Societies	Stanley Stephens	Country	11 February 1969	11 March 1971	2 years, 28 days
Minister of Justice	John Maddison	Liberal	11 February 1969	11 March 1971	2 years, 28 days
Minister for Health	Harry Jago	Liberal	11 February 1969	11 March 1971	2 years, 28 days
Minister for Mines	Wal Fife	Liberal	11 February 1969	11 March 1971	2 years, 28 days
Minister for Child Welfare; Minister for Social Welfare	Frederick Hewitt, MLC	Liberal	11 February 1969	11 March 1971	2 years, 28 days
Assistant Minister	John Waddy	Liberal	11 February 1969	11 March 1971	2 years, 28 days
Assistant Minister	George Freudenstein	Country	11 February 1969	11 March 1971	2 years, 28 days

Ministers are members of the Legislative Assembly unless otherwise noted.

== See also ==
- Members of the New South Wales Legislative Assembly, 1968–1971
- Members of the New South Wales Legislative Council, 1967–1970
- Members of the New South Wales Legislative Council, 1970–1973

== Notes ==
Preceded by Second Askin–Cutler ministry (1968–1969)	Third Askin–Cutler ministry 1969–1971	Succeeded by Fourth Askin–Cutler ministry (1971–1973)
