= Askin–Cutler ministry (1968–1969) =

63rd New South Wales government, led by Bob Askin

The Askin–Cutler ministry (1968–1969) or Second Askin ministry was the 63rd ministry of the Government of New South Wales, and was led by the 32nd Premier, Bob Askin, of the Liberal Party in coalition with the Country Party, led by Charles Cutler. It was the second of six occasions when Askin was Premier; and when Cutler was Deputy Premier.

== Background ==
Askin was elected to the New South Wales Legislative Assembly in 1950 and served continuously up until 1975, representing variously the seats of Collaroy and Pittwater. Rising through the Liberal Party ranks, Askin served as Deputy Leader from 1954 until he was elected Leader of the NSW Liberal Party and Leader of the NSW Opposition, following the defeat of the Morton/Hughes–led coalition by Cahill's Labor at the 1959 election. Cutler was elected to the NSW Legislative Assembly in 1947 and served continuously up until 1975, representing the seat of Orange. Elected Deputy Leader of the Country Party in 1958 and, like Askin, Cutler was elected as leader of his party following the 1959 state election, replacing Davis Hughes. The Askin/Cutler–led Liberal/Country coalition was defeated at the 1962 election by Labor's Bob Heffron. In April 1964 Jack Renshaw replaced Heffron as Leader of the Labor Party and became Premier. Twelve months later, Renshaw called an election held on 13 May 1965; however after 24 years of consecutive Labor governments, Askin and Cutler led the coalition to government at the 1965 state election.

The first Askin/Cutler ministry was commissioned from 1965 until the 1968 state election; when the coalition again won office.

== Composition of ministry ==
This ministry covers the period from 5 March 1968 until 11 February 1969, when Askin and Cutler reconfigured the Liberal/Country ministry.

Portfolio	Minister	Party	Term commence	Term end	Term of office
Premier; Treasurer	Bob Askin (Note: Retained portfolios from the first Askin–Cutler ministry.)	Liberal	5 March 1968	11 February 1969	343 days
Deputy Premier; Minister for Education; Minister for Science	Charles Cutler	Country	5 March 1968	11 February 1969	343 days
Minister for Labour and Industry; Chief Secretary; Minister for Tourist Activities	Eric Willis	Liberal	5 March 1968	11 February 1969	343 days
Minister for Child Welfare; Minister for Social Welfare	Arthur Bridges, MLC (Note: Arthur Bridges died on 22 May 1968.)	Liberal	5 March 1968	22 May 1968	78 days
Advisory Minister for Transport	Arthur Bridges, MLC	Liberal	5 March 1968	22 May 1968	78 days
Vice-president of the Executive Council; Representative of the Government in Legislative Council	Arthur Bridges, MLC	Liberal	5 March 1968	22 May 1968	78 days
Minister for Child Welfare; Minister for Social Welfare	Harry Jago	Liberal	23 May 1968	3 September 1968	103 days
Minister for Child Welfare; Minister for Social Welfare	Frederick Hewitt, MLC	Liberal	3 September 1968	11 February 1969	161 days
Vice-president of the Executive Council; Representative of the Government in Legislative Council	John Fuller, MLC (Note: John Fuller retained the portfolio of Decentralisation and Development from the first Askin–Cutler ministry.)	Country	10 July 1968	11 February 1969	216 days
Minister for Decentralisation and Development	John Fuller, MLC	Country	3 September 1968	11 February 1969	161 days
Minister for Public Works	Davis Hughes	Liberal	3 September 1968	11 February 1969	161 days
Attorney General	Ken McCaw	Liberal	3 September 1968	11 February 1969	161 days
Minister for Local Government; Minister for Highways	Pat Morton	Liberal	3 September 1968	11 February 1969	161 days
Minister for Transport	Milton Morris	Liberal	3 September 1968	11 February 1969	161 days
Minister for Lands	Tom Lewis	Liberal	3 September 1968	11 February 1969	161 days
Minister for Conservation	Jack Beale	Liberal	3 September 1968	11 February 1969	161 days
Minister for Agriculture	Geoff Crawford	Country	3 September 1968	11 February 1969	161 days
Minister for Housing; Minister for Co-operative Societies	Stanley Stephens	Country	3 September 1968	11 February 1969	161 days
Minister of Justice	John Maddison	Liberal	3 September 1968	11 February 1969	161 days
Minister for Health	Harry Jago	Liberal	3 September 1968	11 February 1969	161 days
Minister for Mines	Wal Fife	Liberal	3 September 1968	11 February 1969	161 days

Ministers are members of the Legislative Assembly unless otherwise noted.

== See also ==
- Members of the New South Wales Legislative Assembly, 1968–1971
- Members of the New South Wales Legislative Council, 1967–1970

== Notes ==
Preceded by First Askin–Cutler ministry (1965–1968)	Second Askin–Cutler ministry 1968–1969	Succeeded by Third Askin–Cutler ministry (1969–1971)
