= Minister for Housing (New South Wales) =

Government minister in the New South Wales, Australia

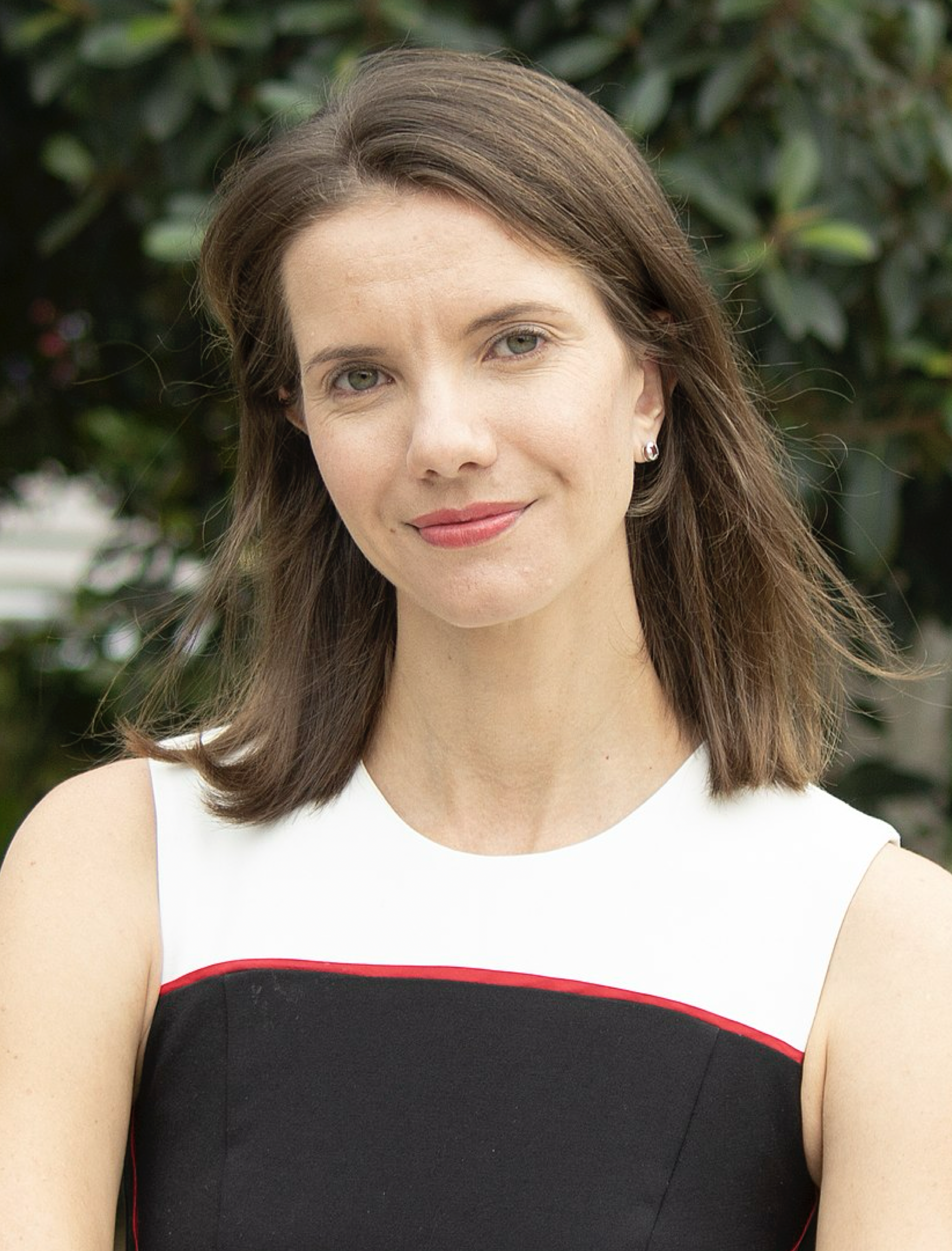
- Incumbent; Rose Jackson since 5 April 2023
- Department of Planning, Housing and Infrastructure
- Appointer: Governor of New South Wales
- Formation: 23 July 1919
- First holder: David Hall

The New South Wales Minister for Housing is a minister in the New South Wales Government with responsibility for the administration and development of social housing and housing policy in New South Wales, Australia.

It was first established in 1919 in the Nationalist ministry of William Holman, with the principal responsibility being the provision of housing for the poor. The ministerial title has had several incarnations from 1919 to 1921, 1922–1925, 1941–2011, 2017–2019, and 2019–2021.

Between 2015 and 2019, there was also a related Minister for Social Housing. It was established in the Second Baird ministry and largely shared responsibility with the Minister for Family and Community Services. Any separation was nominal however as both ministries were held by Brad Hazzard and then Pru Goward. It was abolished in the second Berejiklian ministry.

Between 2019 and 2021, the portfolio was absorbed by the new portfolio of Water, Property and Housing. It was re-established in 2021 as Minister for Homes.

The minister administers the portfolio through the Planning and Environment cluster, including the Department of Planning and Environment and a range of other government agencies. Ultimately the minister is responsible to the Parliament of New South Wales.

== Role and responsibilities ==
=== Housing, Homes and Homelessness ===
A housing board was created in 1912, under the supervision of the Treasurer. A separate ministry was created in 1919 and its initial purpose was to regulate standards for housing construction and to provide housing for the poor. It was abolished with the first Dooley ministry in 1921 and was revived in the first and second Fuller ministries. Housing was re-established as a ministry in the first McKell Ministry as a part of the portfolio of Local Government and Housing. The minister oversaw the Housing Commission established by the Housing Act 1941, to provide housing for the unemployed and other schemes to assist the purchase and/or erection of homes for lower-income and servicemen's families. It became a separate ministry in the second McKell ministry and in addition to housing schemes for the poor the portfolio was responsible for a range of leasing and title bodies including rent control, landlord and tenant issues and strata title. In 2011 with the formation of the O'Farrell ministry housing was absorbed into the portfolio of Family and Community Services.

The separate portfolio of housing was briefly re-created in the First Berejiklian ministry in 2017, however it did not have responsibility for any legislation which remained with the portfolios of family and community services and social housing. The portfolio was abolished in the second Berejiklian ministry and housing became the responsibility of the Minister for Water, Property and Housing. The portfolio was re-established in 2021 in the Second Perrottet ministry as the Minister for Homes, in the Planning, Industry and Environment cluster.

=== Social Housing (2015-2019) ===
The portfolio shared responsibility for the following legislation:

- Aboriginal Housing Act 1998, jointly with the portfolio of Family and Community Services
- Community Housing Providers (Adoption of National Law) Act 2012, jointly with the portfolio of Family and Community Services
- Housing Act 2001, jointly with the portfolio of Family and Community Services
- Residential Tenancies Act 2010, Part 7 Social housing tenancy agreements, jointly with the portfolio of Innovation and Better Regulation. (Note: The rest of the Residential Tenancies Act 2010 was the responsibility of the portfolio of Innovation and Better Regulation).)

== List of ministers ==
=== Housing ===
The following individuals have served as Minister for Housing or any precedent titles:

Ministerial title	Minister	Party	Ministry	Term start	Term end	Time in office	Notes
Minister for Housing	David Hall	Nationalist	Holman (2)	23 July 1919	9 February 1920	201 days	
Minister for Housing	Charles Oakes	Nationalist	Holman (2)	9 February 1920	12 April 1920	63 days	
Minister for Housing	James Dooley	Labor	Storey	12 April 1920	10 October 1921	1 year, 181 days	
Minister for Housing	Sir Thomas Henley	Nationalist	Fuller (1)	20 December 1921 a.m.	20 December 1921 p.m.	7 hours	
Minister for Housing	Sir Thomas Henley	Nationalist	Fuller (2)	13 April 1922	19 June 1922	67 days	
Minister for Housing	Richard Ball	Nationalist	Fuller (2)	28 June 1922	17 June 1925	2 years, 354 days	
Minister for Local Government and Housing	James McGirr	Labor	McKell (1)	16 May 1941	8 June 1944	5 years, 266 days	
Minister for Housing	James McGirr	Labor	McKell (2)	8 June 1944	6 February 1947	5 years, 266 days	
Minister for Housing	Clive Evatt	Labor	McGirr (1) (2)	6 February 1947	30 June 1950	3 years, 144 days	
Minister for Housing	Gus Kelly	Labor	McGirr (3)	30 June 1950	2 April 1952	1 year, 277 days	
Minister for Housing	Clive Evatt	Labor	Cahill (1) (2)	2 April 1952	1 April 1954	1 year, 364 days	
Minister for Housing	Gus Kelly	Labor	Cahill (2)	1 April 1954	2 September 1954	154 days	
Minister for Housing	John McGrath	Labor	Cahill (2)	2 September 1954	15 March 1956	1 year, 195 days	
Minister for Housing	Abe Landa	Labor	Cahill (3) (4); Heffron (1) (2); Renshaw	15 March 1956	13 May 1965	9 years, 59 days	
Minister for Housing	Stanley Stephens	Country	Askin (1) (2) (3) (4)	13 May 1965	17 January 1973	7 years, 249 days	
Minister for Housing	Tim Bruxner	Country	Askin (5)	17 January 1973	3 December 1973	320 days	
Minister for Housing	Laurie McGinty	Liberal	Askin (6); Lewis (1) (2)	3 December 1973	23 January 1976	2 years, 51 days	
Minister for Housing	Ian Griffith	Liberal	Willis	23 January 1976	14 May 1976	112 days	
Minister for Housing	Jack Ferguson	Labor	Wran (1)	14 May 1976	10 February 1977	272 days	
Minister for Housing	Ron Mulock	Labor	Wran (1)	10 February 1977	19 October 1978	1 year, 251 days	
Minister for Housing	Syd Einfeld	Labor	Wran (2)	19 October 1978	29 February 1980	1 year, 133 days	
Minister for Housing	Terry Sheahan	Labor	Wran (3) (4)	29 February 1980	1 February 1983	2 years, 338 days	
Minister for Housing	Frank Walker	Labor	Wran (5) (6) (7) (8); Unsworth	1 February 1983	21 March 1988	5 years, 49 days	
Minister for Housing	Joe Schipp	Liberal	Greiner (1) (2)	21 March 1988	3 July 1992	4 years, 104 days	
Minister for Housing	Robert Webster	Country	Fahey (1) (2) (3)	3 July 1992	4 April 1995	2 years, 275 days	
Minister for Housing	Craig Knowles	Labor	Carr (1) (2)	4 April 1995	8 April 1999	4 years, 4 days	
Minister for Housing	Andrew Refshauge	Labor	Carr (3)	8 April 1999	2 April 2003	3 years, 359 days	
Minister for Housing	Carl Scully	Labor	Carr (4)	2 April 2003	21 January 2005	1 year, 294 days	
Minister for Housing	Joe Tripodi	Labor	Iemma (1)	21 January 2005	10 August 2005	201 days	
Minister for Housing	Cherie Burton	Labor	Iemma (1)	10 August 2005	2 April 2007	1 year, 235 days	
Minister for Housing	Matt Brown	Labor	Iemma (2)	2 April 2007	8 September 2008	1 year, 159 days	
Minister for Housing	David Borger	Labor	Rees	8 September 2008	21 May 2010	1 year, 255 days	
Minister for Housing	Frank Terenzini	Labor	Keneally	21 May 2010	28 March 2011	311 days	
Minister for Housing	Anthony Roberts	Liberal	Berejiklian (1)	30 January 2017	23 March 2019	2 years, 52 days	
Minister for Water, Property and Housing	Melinda Pavey	National	Berejiklian (2); Perrottet (1)	2 April 2019	21 December 2021	2 years, 263 days	
Minister for Homes	Anthony Roberts	Liberal	Perrottet (2)	21 December 2021	28 March 2023	1 year, 97 days	
Minister for the Environment	Penny Sharpe	Labor	Minns	28 March 2023	5 April 2023	8 days	
Minister for Housing	Rose Jackson	Labor	Minns	5 April 2023	incumbent	3 years, 227 days	

=== Homelessness ===
The following individuals have served as Minister for Homelessness:

Ministerial title	Minister	Party	Ministry	Term start	Term end	Time in office	Notes
Minister for Homelessness	Rose Jackson	Labor	Minns	5 April 2023	incumbent	3 years, 227 days	

== Former ministerial title ==
=== Social housing ===
Ministerial title	Minister	Party	Ministry	Term start	Term end	Time in office	Notes
Minister for Social Housing	Brad Hazzard	Liberal	Baird (2)	2 April 2015	30 January 2017	1 year, 303 days	
Minister for Social Housing	Pru Goward	Liberal	Berejiklian (1)	30 January 2017	23 March 2019	2 years, 52 days	

== See also ==
- Minister for Housing (Australia)
- Minister for Housing (Victoria)
- Minister for Housing (Western Australia)
