= Minister for Better Regulation and Fair Trading =

Minister in the Government of New South Wales

- Incumbent; Anoulack Chanthivong since 5 April 2023
- Department of Customer Service
- Style: The Honourable
- Nominator: Premier of New South Wales
- Appointer: Governor of New South Wales
- Inaugural holder: Frederick Hewitt (as the Minister for Consumer Affairs)
- Formation: 3 December 1973

The Minister for Better Regulation and Fair Trading is a minister in the Government of New South Wales responsible for administering legislation and policy in relation to consumer affairs and SafeWork regulation in New South Wales, Australia.

The current minister is Anoulack Chanthivong since 5 April 2023, who also serves as the Minister for Industry and Trade.

The minister assists the Minister for Customer Service and Digital Government administer his portfolio through the Customer Service cluster, in particular NSW Fair Trading.

Ultimately the ministers are responsible to the Parliament of New South Wales.

== Roles and responsibilities ==
=== Co-operative Societies (1949-1995) ===
The Registrar of Co-Operative Societies was established under the Building and Co-operative Societies Act 1901. The Registrar of Co-operative Societies could inquire into the working and financial condition of a society or authorise any public servant, accountant, or actuary to inspect any minutes or books or to examine into, and report upon, the affairs of a society. In 1923 an advisory council was established by the Co-operation, Community Settlement and Credit Act 1923, to make recommendations to the Treasurer. The Council submitted recommendations about the rules and regulations relating to societies and any action to be taken by the Treasurer, including the appointment of committees. The Registrar of Co-operative Societies was an ex officio member of the Council and the Treasurer could attend any meeting, and would preside over such meetings. The ministerial position was created in a ministerial reshuffle in the second McGirr ministry October 1949 with responsibilities transferring from the Treasurer to the Minister for Co-operative Societies. The inaugural minister Clarrie Martin held the portfolio in addition to his portfolio of Attorney–General.

From February 1983 the ministerial responsibilities were transferred to the Minister for Housing. The responsibilities were transferred to the Attorney General in January 1986, with the portfolio being formally re-created in February 1986 and filled by Terry Sheahan, who was also the Attorney General. The portfolio was abolished in the first Greiner ministry in March 1988 with the responsibilities allocated to the Minister for Business and Consumer Affairs. It was re-created in the second Greiner ministry. It was abolished in April 1995 and the responsibilities transferred to the Minister for Business and Consumer Affairs.

=== Consumer Affairs (1973-1995) ===
The portfolio was established in December 1973 in the sixth Askin ministry and the major task of the portfolio was to ensure consumers were treated fairly. This was handled by consumer education, providing a complaints service, licensing some occupational groups, investigating prices and charges, responsible for weights and measures and landlord and tenant matters. The administrative units responsible to the Ministry included the Consumer Affairs Council and Consumer Affairs Bureau, the Weights and Measures Office, the Prices Branch and Registry of Consumer Claims Tribunals. The establishment of the Ministry also coincided with three entirely new acts of Parliament dealing with important aspects of consumer protection, namely the Consumer Claims Tribunals Act 1974, the Pyramid Sales Act 1974 and the Motor Dealers Act 1974.

The Fair Trading Minister is responsible for the regulation of various occupations, organisations and industries including incorporated associations, hairdressers, charitable fundraisers, pawnbrokers, biofuels and co-operatives.

== List of ministers ==
Ministerial title	Minister	Party	Ministry	Term start	Term end	Time in office	Notes
Minister for Consumer Affairs	Frederick Hewitt	Liberal	Askin (6); Lewis (1) (2); Willis	4 December 1973	14 May 1976	2 years, 163 days	
Minister for Consumer Affairs	Syd Einfeld	Labor	Wran (1) (2) (3)	14 May 1976	2 October 1981	5 years, 141 days	
Minister for Consumer Affairs	Paul Whelan	Labor	Wran (4)	2 October 1981	1 February 1983	1 year, 122 days	
Minister for Consumer Affairs	Paul Landa	Labor	Wran (5) (6) (7)	1 February 1983	10 February 1984	1 year, 9 days	
Minister for Consumer Affairs	George Paciullo	Labor	Wran (7)	5 April 1984	6 February 1986	1 year, 307 days	
Minister for Consumer Affairs	Bob Carr	Labor	Wran (8)	6 February 1986	4 July 1986	148 days	
Minister for Consumer Affairs	Deirdre Grusovin	Labor	Unsworth	4 July 1986	21 March 1988	1 year, 261 days	
Minister for Business and Consumer Affairs	Gerry Peacocke	National	Grieiner (1)	25 March 1988	6 June 1991	3 years, 73 days	
Minister for Consumer Affairs	Peter Collins	Liberal	Greiner (2); Fahey (1)	6 June 1991	3 July 1992	1 year, 27 days	
Minister for Consumer Affairs	Kerry Chikarovski	Liberal	Fahey (2)	3 July 1992	26 May 1993	327 days	
Minister for Consumer Affairs	Wendy Machin	National	Fahey (3)	26 May 1993	4 April 1995	1 year, 313 days	
Minister for Consumer Affairs	Faye Lo Po'	Labor	Carr (1)	4 April 1995	6 December 1995	2 years, 241 days	
Minister for Fair Trading	Faye Lo Po'	Labor	Carr (1)	6 December 1995	1 December 1997	2 years, 241 days	
Minister for Fair Trading	Brian Langton	Labor	Carr (2)	1 December 1997	30 April 1998	150 days	
Minister for Fair Trading	Jeff Shaw	Labor	Carr (2)	30 April 1998	8 April 1999	343 days	
Minister for Fair Trading	John Watkins	Labor	Carr (3)	8 April 1999	21 November 2001	2 years, 227 days	
Minister for Fair Trading	John Aquilina	Labor	Carr (3)	21 November 2001	2 April 2003	1 year, 132 days	
Minister for Fair Trading	Reba Meagher	Labor	Carr (4)	2 April 2003	21 January 2005	1 year, 294 days	
Minister for Fair Trading	John Hatzistergos	Labor	Carr (4)	1 February 2005	3 August 2005	183 days	
Minister for Fair Trading	Diane Beamer	Labor	Iemma (1)	3 August 2005	2 April 2007	1 year, 242 days	
Minister for Fair Trading	Linda Burney	Labor	Iemma (2)	2 April 2007	5 September 2008	1 year, 156 days	
Minister for Fair Trading	Virginia Judge	Labor	Rees; Keneally	5 September 2008	28 March 2011	2 years, 204 days	
Minister for Fair Trading	Anthony Roberts	Liberal	O'Farrell	3 April 2011	9 December 2013	2 years, 250 days	
Minister for Fair Trading	Stuart Ayres	Liberal	Baird (1)	9 December 2013	6 May 2014	148 days	
Minister for Fair Trading	Matthew Mason-Cox	Liberal	Baird (1)	6 May 2014	2 April 2015	331 days	
Minister for Innovation and Better Regulation	Victor Dominello	Liberal	Baird (2)	2 April 2015	30 January 2017	1 year, 303 days	
Minister for Innovation and Better Regulation	Matt Kean	Liberal	Berejiklian (1)	30 January 2017	23 March 2019	2 years, 52 days	
Minister for Better Regulation and Innovation	Kevin Anderson	National	Berejiklian (2); Perrottet (1)	2 April 2019	21 December 2021	2 years, 263 days	
Minister for Fair Trading	Eleni Petinos	Liberal	Perrottet (2)	21 December 2021	3 August 2022	225 days	
Minister for Fair Trading	Victor Dominello	Liberal	Perrottet (2)	3 August 2022	28 March 2023	237 days	
Minister for Transport	Jo Haylen	Labor	Minns	28 March 2023	5 April 2023	8 days	
Minister for Better Regulation and Fair Trading	Anoulack Chanthivong	Labor	Minns	5 April 2023	incumbent	3 years, 203 days	

== Former ministerial titles ==
=== Co-operative Societies ===
The Minister for Co-operative Societies, later Minister for Cooperatives was a ministry in the government of New South Wales, with responsibility for regulating and registering co-operative societies, including housing societies, friendly societies, Starr-Bowkett Societies, credit unions and building societies. It has had three iterations, from September 1949 until February 1983, from February 1986 until March 1988 and from June 1991 until April 1995.

Title	Minister	Party	Ministry	Term start	Term end	Time in office	Notes
Minister for Co-operative Societies	Clarrie Martin	Labor	McGirr (2)	21 September 1949	30 June 1950	282 days	
Minister for Co-operative Societies	Clive Evatt	Labor	McGirr (3); Cahill (1) (2)	30 June 1950	1 April 1954	3 years, 275 days	
Minister for Co-operative Societies	Gus Kelly	Labor	Cahill (2) (3)	1 April 1954	1 April 1959	5 years, 0 days	
Minister for Co-operative Societies	Abe Landa	Labor	Cahill (4); Heffron (1) (2); Renshaw	1 April 1959	13 May 1965	6 years, 42 days	
Minister for Co-operative Societies	Stanley Stephens	Country	Askin (1) (2) (3) (4)	13 May 1965	17 January 1973	7 years, 249 days	
Minister for Co-operative Societies	Tim Bruxner	Country	Askin (5)	17 January 1973	3 December 1973	320 days	
Minister for Co-operative Societies	Laurie McGinty	Liberal	Askin (6); Lewis (1) (2)	3 December 1973	23 January 1976	2 years, 51 days	
Minister for Co-operative Societies	Ian Griffith	Liberal	Willis	23 January 1976	14 May 1976	112 days	
Minister for Co-operative Societies	Syd Einfeld	Labor	Wran (1) (2)	14 May 1976	29 February 1980	3 years, 291 days	
Minister for Co-operative Societies	Terry Sheahan	Labor	Wran (3) (4)	29 February 1980	1 February 1983	2 years, 338 days	
Minister for Co-operative Societies	Terry Sheahan	Labor	Wran (8)	6 February 1986	4 July 1986	148 days	
Minister for Co-operative Societies	Bob Debus	Labor	Unsworth	4 July 1986	21 March 1988	1 year, 261 days	
Minister for Local Government and Minister for Cooperatives	Gerry Peacocke	National	Greiner (2)	6 June 1991	26 May 1993	1 year, 354 days	
Minister for Local Government and Co-operatives	Garry West	National	Fahey (1) (2)	26 May 1993	27 June 1994	1 year, 32 days	
Minister for Local Government and Co-operatives	Ted Pickering	Liberal	Fahey (3)	27 June 1994	4 April 1995	281 days	

=== Regulatory Reform ===
Ministerial title	Minister	Party	Ministry	Term start	Term end	Time in office	Notes
Minister for Economic Reform	Michael Costa	Labor	Carr (4)	21 January 2005	3 August 2005	194 days	
Minister Assisting the Treasurer on Business and Economic Regulatory Reform	Joe Tripodi	Labor	Iemma (1)	17 February 2006	2 April 2007	3 years, 273 days	
Minister for Small Business and Regulatory Reform	Joe Tripodi	Labor	Iemma (2)	2 April 2007	27 June 2007	3 years, 273 days	
Minister for Regulatory Reform	Joe Tripodi	Labor	Iemma (2); Rees	27 June 2007	17 November 2009	3 years, 273 days	
Minister for Regulatory Reform	Peter Primrose	Labor	Rees	17 November 2009	4 December 2009	17 days	
Minister for Regulatory Reform	John Hatzistergos	Labor	Keneally	8 December 2009	28 March 2011	1 year, 110 days	

== See also ==
- List of New South Wales government agencies
