= Askin–Cutler ministry (1965–1968) =

62nd New South Wales government, led by Bob Askin

The Askin–Cutler ministry (1965–1968) or First Askin ministry was the 62nd ministry of the government of New South Wales, and was led by the 32nd Premier, Bob Askin, of the Liberal Party in coalition with the Country Party, led by Charles Cutler. The ministry was the first occasion in the history of government in New South Wales that the Liberal and Country Party formed a coalition in government. It was also the first of six occasions when Askin was Premier; and when Cutler was Deputy Premier.

== Background ==
Askin was elected to the New South Wales Legislative Assembly in 1950 and served continuously up until 1975, representing variously the seats of Collaroy and Pittwater. Rising through the Liberal Party ranks, Askin served as Deputy Leader from 1954 until he was elected Leader of the NSW Liberal Party and Leader of the NSW Opposition, following the defeat of the Morton/Hughes–led coalition by Cahill's Labor at the 1959 election. Cutler was elected to the NSW Legislative Assembly in 1947 and served continuously up until 1975, representing the seat of Orange. Elected Deputy Leader of the Country Party in 1958 and, like Askin, Cutler was elected as leader of his party following the 1959 state election, replacing Davis Hughes. The Askin/Cutler–led Liberal/Country coalition was defeated at the 1962 election by Labor's Bob Heffron. In April 1964 Jack Renshaw replaced Heffron as Leader of the Labor Party and became Premier. Twelve months later, Renshaw called an election held on 13 May 1965; however after 24 years of consecutive Labor governments, Askin and Cutler led the coalition to government at the 1965 state election.

== Composition of ministry ==
This ministry covers the period from 13 May 1965 until 5 March 1968, when Askin and Cutler led the Liberal/Country coalition to a second term at the 1968 state election, defeating Labor, again led by Jack Renshaw.

Portfolio	Minister	Party	Term commence	Term end	Term of office
Premier; Treasurer	Bob Askin	Liberal	13 May 1965	5 March 1968	2 years, 297 days
Deputy Premier; Minister for Education; Minister for Science	Charles Cutler	Country	13 May 1965	5 March 1968	2 years, 297 days
Minister for Labour and Industry; Chief Secretary; Minister for Tourist Activities	Eric Willis	Liberal	13 May 1965	5 March 1968	2 years, 297 days
Minister for Child Welfare; Minister for Social Welfare; Advisory Minister for Transport; Vice-president of the Executive Council; Representative of the Government in Legislative Council	Arthur Bridges, MLC	Liberal	13 May 1965	5 March 1968	2 years, 297 days
Minister for Agriculture	Bill Chaffey	Country	13 May 1965	5 March 1968	2 years, 297 days
Attorney General	Ken McCaw	Liberal	13 May 1965	5 March 1968	2 years, 297 days
Minister for Local Government; Minister for Highways	Pat Morton	Liberal	13 May 1965	5 March 1968	2 years, 297 days
Minister for Public Works	Davis Hughes	Country	13 May 1965	5 March 1968	2 years, 297 days
Minister for Transport	Milton Morris	Liberal	13 May 1965	5 March 1968	2 years, 297 days
Minister for Decentralisation and Development	John Fuller, MLC	Country	13 May 1965	5 March 1968	2 years, 297 days
Minister for Lands	Tom Lewis	Liberal	13 May 1965	5 March 1968	2 years, 297 days
Minister for Mines	Tom Lewis	Liberal	13 May 1965	27 June 1967	2 years, 45 days
Minister for Mines	Wal Fife	Liberal	27 June 1967	5 March 1968	252 days
Minister for Conservation	Jack Beale	Liberal	13 May 1965	5 March 1968	2 years, 297 days
Minister for Housing; Minister for Co-operative Societies	Stanley Stephens	Country	13 May 1965	5 March 1968	2 years, 297 days
Minister of Justice	John Maddison	Liberal	13 May 1965	5 March 1968	2 years, 297 days
Minister for Health	Harry Jago	Liberal	13 May 1965	5 March 1968	2 years, 297 days
Assistant Minister for Education	Wal Fife	Liberal	13 May 1965	27 June 1967	2 years, 45 days

Ministers are members of the Legislative Assembly unless otherwise noted.

== See also ==
- Members of the New South Wales Legislative Assembly, 1965–1968
- Members of the New South Wales Legislative Council, 1964–1967
- Members of the New South Wales Legislative Council, 1967–1970

Preceded by Renshaw ministry (1964–1965)	First Askin–Cutler ministry 1965–1968	Succeeded by Second Askin–Cutler ministry (1968–1969)
