= Minister for Roads (New South Wales) =

Government Roads minister in New South Wales, Australia

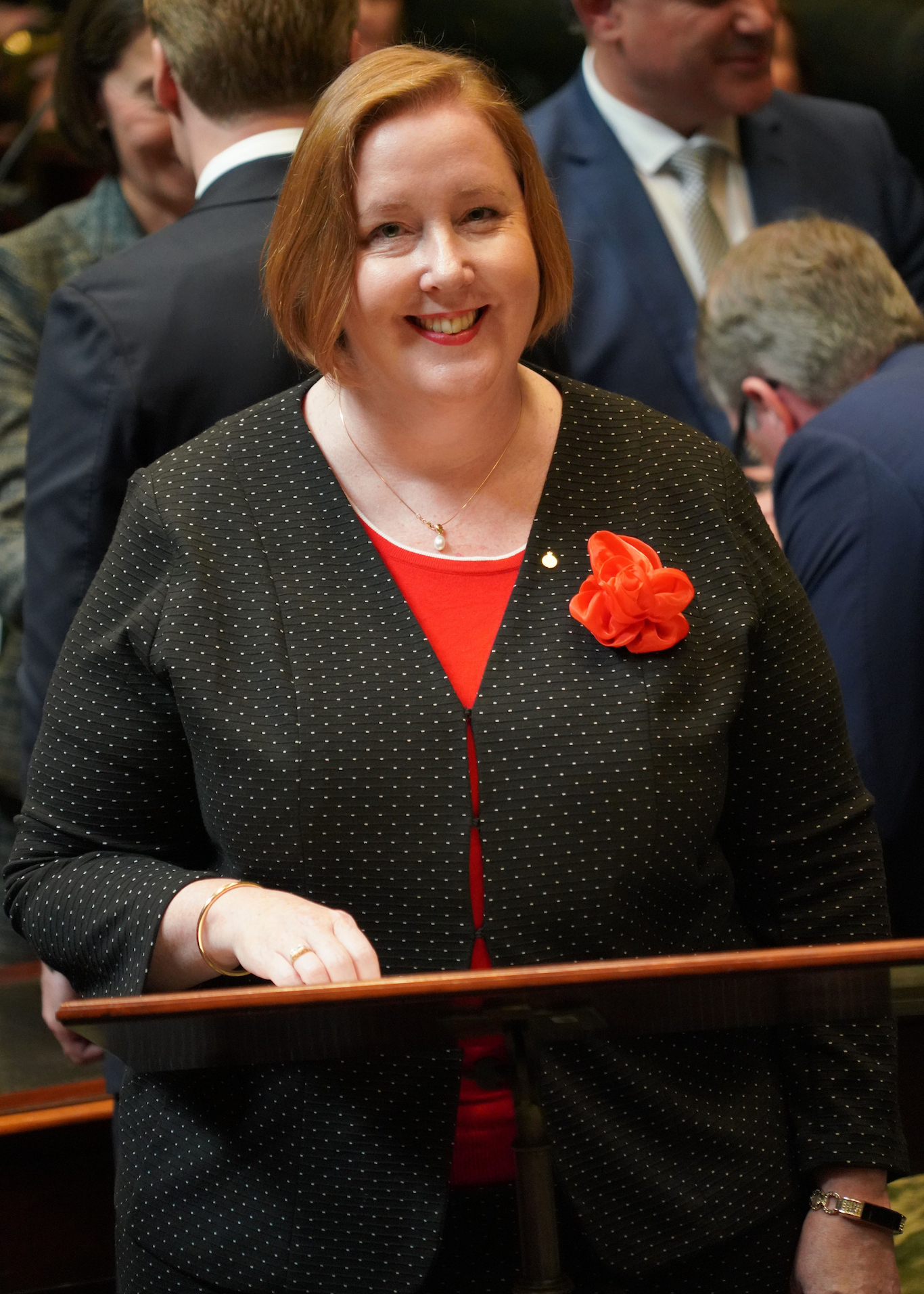
- Incumbent; Jenny Aitchison since 17 March 2025
- Department of Transport
- Style: The Honourable
- Nominator: Premier of New South Wales
- Appointer: Governor of New South Wales
- Formation: 15 March 1956

The Minister for Roads is a minister in the Government of New South Wales who has responsibilities which includes the development of road infrastructure and road pricing, and taxi and hire car policy and regulation. The portfolio has been previously known as the Minister for Highways, Minister for Roads and Freight and Minister for Metropolitan Roads. Since 2025, Jenny Aitchison has served as Minister for Roads.

In the Minns ministry since April 2023, it has been one of three ministries in the transport sector and the Minister, works with the Minister for Regional Transport, presently also Aitchison, and the Minister for Transport. Together they administer the portfolio through the Department of Transport (Transport for NSW) and a range of other government agencies that coordinate funding arrangements for transport operators, including hundreds of local and community transport operators.

== List of ministers ==
The following individuals have been appointed as Ministers for highways or roads.

Ministerial title	Minister	Party	Ministry	Term start	Term end	Time in office	Notes
Minister for Highways	Jack Renshaw	Labor	Cahill (3) (4)	15 March 1956	28 October 1959	3 years, 227 days	
Minister for Highways	Pat Hills	Labor	Heffron (1) (2); Renshaw	28 October 1959	13 May 1965	5 years, 197 days	
Minister for Highways	Pat Morton	Liberal	Askin (1) (2) (3) (4)	13 May 1965	19 June 1972	7 years, 37 days	
Minister for Highways	Sir Charles Cutler	Country	Askin (4) (5) (6)	19 June 1972	3 January 1975	2 years, 198 days	
Minister for Highways	Wal Fife	Liberal	Lewis (1)	3 January 1975	10 October 1975	280 days	
Minister for Highways	Max Ruddock	Liberal	Lewis (1) (2)	10 October 1975	23 January 1976	105 days	
Minister for Highways	Tim Bruxner	Country	Willis	23 January 1976	14 May 1976	112 days	
Minister for Highways	Peter Cox	Labor	Wran (1)	14 May 1976	19 October 1978	2 years, 158 days	
Minister for Roads	Harry Jensen	Labor	Wran (2) (3)	19 October 1978	2 October 1981	2 years, 348 days	
Minister for Roads	Paul Whelan	Labor	Wran (4)	2 October 1981	1 February 1983	1 year, 122 days	
Minister for Roads	Rex Jackson	Labor	Wran (5)	1 February 1983	27 October 1983	268 days	
Minister for Roads	Laurie Brereton	Labor	Wran (5)	27 October 1983	10 November 1983	14 days	
Minister for Roads	George Paciullo	Labor	Wran (5)	10 November 1983	10 February 1984	92 days	
Minister for Roads	Pat Hills	Labor	Wran (6)	10 February 1984	5 April 1984	55 days	
Minister for Roads	Laurie Brereton	Labor	Wran (7) (8); Unsworth	5 April 1984	26 November 1987	3 years, 235 days	
Minister for Roads	Wal Murray	National	Greiner (1) (2); Fahey (1) (2)	24 July 1990	26 May 1993	2 years, 306 days	
Minister for Roads	Bruce Baird	Liberal	Fahey (3)	26 May 1993	4 April 1995	1 year, 313 days	
Minister for Roads	Michael Knight	Labor	Carr (1)	4 April 1995	28 November 1996	1 year, 238 days	
Minister for Roads	Carl Scully	Labor	Carr (1) (2) (3) (4)	28 November 1996	21 January 2005	8 years, 54 days	
Minister for Roads	Michael Costa	Labor	Iemma (1)	21 January 2005	3 August 2005	194 days	
Minister for Roads	Joe Tripodi	Labor	Iemma (1)	3 August 2005	17 February 2006	198 days	
Minister for Roads	Eric Roozendaal	Labor	Iemma (2)	17 February 2006	5 September 2008	2 years, 211 days	
Minister for Roads	Michael Daley	Labor	Rees	8 September 2008	14 September 2009	1 year, 6 days	
Minister for Transport and Roads	David Campbell	Labor	Keneally	8 December 2009	20 May 2010	163 days	
Minister for Roads	David Borger	Labor	Keneally	21 May 2010	28 March 2011	318 days	
Minister for Roads and Ports	Duncan Gay	National	O'Farrell	4 April 2011	23 April 2014	5 years, 301 days	
Minister for Roads and Freight	Duncan Gay	National	Baird (1)	23 April 2014	2 April 2015	5 years, 301 days	
Minister for Roads, Maritime and Freight	Duncan Gay	National	Baird (2)	2 April 2015	30 January 2017	5 years, 301 days	
Minister for Roads, Maritime and Freight	Melinda Pavey	National	Berejiklian (1)	30 January 2017	23 March 2019	2 years, 52 days	
Minister for Transport and Roads	Andrew Constance	Liberal	Berejiklian (2)	2 April 2019	5 October 2021	2 years, 186 days	
Minister for Transport and Roads	Rob Stokes	Liberal	Perrottet (1)	6 October 2021	21 December 2021	76 days	
Minister for Metropolitan Roads	Natalie Ward	Liberal	Perrottet (2)	21 December 2021	28 March 2023	1 year, 97 days	
Minister for Roads	John Graham	Labor	Minns	28 March 2023	17 March 2025	1 year, 354 days	
Minister for Roads	Jenny Aitchison	Labor	Minns	17 March 2025	incumbent	1 year, 174 days	

== Related Ministries ==
The following individuals have been appointed as Ministers for Regional Transport, or any precedent title.

Ministerial title	Minister	Party	Ministry	Term start	Term end	Time in office	Notes
Minister for Regional Transport and Roads	Paul Toole	National	Berejiklian (2); Perrottet (1)	2 April 2019	21 December 2021	2 years, 263 days	
Minister for Regional Transport and Roads	Sam Farraway	National	Perrottet (2)	21 December 2021	28 March 2023	1 year, 97 days	
Minister for Regional Transport and Roads	Jenny Aitchison	Labor	Minns	5 April 2023	17 March 2025	3 years, 155 days	
Minister for Regional Transport	Jenny Aitchison	Labor	Minns	17 March 2025	incumbent	3 years, 155 days	

== Assistant ministers ==
The following individuals have been appointed as Assistant Ministers with responsibility for assisting or advising the Minister for Roads.

Ministerial title	Minister	Party	Ministry	Term start	Term end	Time in office	Notes
Assistant Minister for Roads	Michael Yabsley	Liberal		24 July 1990	6 June 1991	317 days	
Minister Assisting the Minister for Roads	Wendy Machin	National		26 May 1993	4 April 1995	1 year, 313 days	

== See also ==
- List of New South Wales government agencies
