= Minister for Innovation, Science and Technology =

Government minister in New South Wales, Australia

- Incumbent; Anoulack Chanthivong since 5 April 2023
- Premier's Department
- Style: The Honourable
- Appointer: Governor of New South Wales
- Inaugural holder: Charles Cutler (as Minister for Science)
- Formation: 13 May 1965

The Innovation, Science and Technology is a minister in the New South Wales Government and has responsibilities that includes all schools and institutes of higher education in New South Wales, Australia.

The ministers manages the portfolio through the Premier's Department. Ultimately, the ministers are responsible to the Parliament of New South Wales.

There have previously been ministers responsible for Science, Innovation and Technology; however the combined ministry was first created in December 2021 in the second Perrottet ministry.

== List of ministers ==
The following individuals have served as the Minister for Science, Innovation and Technology, or any precedent titles:

Title	Minister	Party	Ministry	Term start	Term end	Time in office	Notes
Minister for Science	Charles Cutler	Country	Askin (1) (2) (3) (4)	13 May 1965	19 June 1972	7 years, 37 days	
Minister for Technology	Pat Hills	Labor	Wran (2)	19 October 1978	29 February 1980	1 year, 133 days	
Minister for Technology	Ron Mulock	Labor	Wran (3)	29 February 1980	2 October 1981	1 year, 216 days	
Minister for Technology	Pat Hills	Labor	Wran (4) (5)	2 October 1981	10 February 1984	2 years, 131 days	
Minister for Small Business and Technology	George Paciullo	Labor	Wran (6)	10 February 1984	5 April 1984	55 days	
Minister for Small Business and Technology	Eric Bedford	Labor	Wran (7)	5 April 1984	31 December 1985	1 year, 270 days	
Minister for Small Business and Technology	Neville Wran	Labor	Wran (7)	1 January 1986	6 February 1986	36 days	
Minister for Energy and Technology	Peter Cox	Labor	Wran (8); Unsworth	6 February 1986	26 November 1987	1 year, 293 days	
Minister for Information Technology	Kim Yeadon	Labor	Carr (2) (3)	1 December 1997	2 April 2003	5 years, 122 days	
Minister for Science and Medical Research	Frank Sartor	Labor	Carr (4); Iemma (1)	2 April 2003	2 April 2007	4 years, 0 days	
Minister for Science and Medical Research	Verity Firth	Labor	Iemma (2)	2 April 2007	5 September 2008	1 year, 156 days	
Minister for Science and Medical Research	Tony Stewart	Labor	Rees	8 September 2008	4 November 2008	57 days	
Minister for Science and Medical Research	Jodi McKay	Labor	Rees; Keneally	4 November 2008	28 March 2011	2 years, 144 days	
Minister for Innovation and Better Regulation	Victor Dominello	Liberal	Baird (2)	2 April 2015	30 January 2017	1 year, 303 days	
Minister for Innovation and Better Regulation	Matt Kean	Liberal	Berejiklian (1)	30 January 2017	23 March 2019	2 years, 52 days	
Minister for Better Regulation and Innovation	Kevin Anderson	National	Berejiklian (2); Perrottet (1)	2 April 2019	21 December 2021	2 years, 263 days	
Minister for Science, Innovation and Technology	Alister Henskens	Liberal	Perrottet (2)	21 December 2021	28 March 2023	1 year, 97 days	
Minister for Transport	Jo Haylen	Labor	Minns	28 March 2023	5 April 2023	8 days	
Minister for Innovation, Science and Technology	Anoulack Chanthivong	Labor	Minns	5 April 2023	incumbent	3 years, 155 days	

== See also ==
- List of New South Wales government agencies
