= Minister for the Environment (New South Wales) =

Environment minister in New South Wales

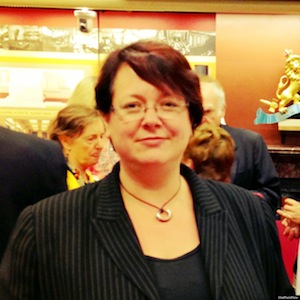
- Incumbent; Penny Sharpe since 28 March 2023
- Department of Climate Change, Energy, the Environment and Water
- Style: The Honourable
- Appointer: Governor of New South Wales
- Inaugural holder: Jack Beale (as Minister for Environmental Control); Bill Dunn (as Minister for Conservation)
- Formation: 1971 (Environmental Control); 1944 (Conservation)

The New South Wales Minister for the Environment is a ministerial position in the Government of New South Wales with responsibilities including environmental policy and regulation, management of the state’s national parks, and the conservation and protection of built and environmental heritage in New South Wales, Australia. The current minister, since 28 March 2023, is Penny Sharpe.

Between the 2019 state election and December 2021, the ministerial post was merged with the Energy and Utilities portfolio to create the Minister for Energy and Environment. Between December 2021 and March 2023, the environment ministerial post was combined with heritage to create the title of Minister for the Environment and Heritage.

The minister administers the portfolio through the Department of Climate Change, Energy, the Environment and Water and a range of other government agencies.

Ultimately, the minister is responsible to the Parliament of New South Wales.

== List of ministers ==
=== Environment ===
Ministerial title	Minister	Party	Ministry	Term start	Term end	Time in office	Notes
Minister for Environmental Control	Jack Beale	Liberal	Askin (4) (5)	11 March 1971	3 December 1973	2 years, 267 days	
Minister for Planning and Environment	Sir John Fuller	Country	Askin (6)	3 December 1973	14 May 1976	2 years, 163 days	
Minister for Environment	Bill Crabtree	Labor	Wran (1)	14 May 1976	9 August 1976	87 days	
Minister for Planning and Environment	Paul Landa	Labor	Wran (1) (2)	9 August 1976	29 February 1980	3 years, 204 days	
Minister for Planning and Environment	Eric Bedford	Labor	Wran (3) (4) (5)	29 February 1980	10 February 1984	3 years, 347 days	
Minister for Planning and Environment	Terry Sheahan	Labor	Wran (6)	10 February 1984	12 December 1984	306 days	
Minister for Planning and Environment	Bob Carr	Labor	Wran (7) (8); Unsworth	12 December 1984	21 March 1988	3 years, 100 days	
Minister for the Environment	Tim Moore	Liberal	Greiner (1) (2)	25 March 1988	24 June 1992	4 years, 91 days	
Minister for the Environment	Bruce Baird	Liberal	Fahey (1)	24 June 1992	3 July 1992	9 days	
Minister for the Environment	Chris Hartcher	Liberal	Fahey (2) (3)	3 July 1992	4 April 1995	2 years, 275 days	
Minister for the Environment	Pam Allan	Labor	Carr (1) (2)	4 April 1995	8 April 1999	4 years, 4 days	
Minister for the Environment	Bob Debus	Labor	Carr (3) (4); Iemma (1)	8 April 1999	2 April 2007	7 years, 359 days	
Minister for Climate Change, Environment and Water	Phil Koperberg	Labor	Iemma (2)	2 April 2007	27 February 2008	331 days	
Minister for Climate Change and the Environment	Verity Firth	Labor	Iemma (2)	27 February 2008	5 September 2008	191 days	
Minister for Climate Change and the Environment	Carmel Tebbutt	Labor	Rees	8 September 2008	14 September 2009	1 year, 6 days	
Minister for Climate Change and the Environment	John Robertson	Labor	Rees	14 September 2009	4 December 2009	81 days	
Minister for Climate Change and the Environment	Frank Sartor	Labor	Keneally	8 December 2009	28 March 2011	1 year, 110 days	
Minister for the Environment	Robyn Parker	Liberal	O'Farrell	3 April 2011	23 April 2014	3 years, 20 days	
Minister for the Environment	Rob Stokes	Liberal	Baird (1)	23 April 2014	2 April 2015	344 days	
Minister for the Environment	Mark Speakman	Liberal	Baird (2)	2 April 2015	30 January 2017	1 year, 303 days	
Minister for the Environment	Gabrielle Upton	Liberal	Berejiklian (1)	30 January 2017	23 March 2019	2 years, 52 days	
Minister for Energy and Environment	Matt Kean	Liberal	Berejiklian (2); Perrottet (1)	2 April 2019	21 December 2021	2 years, 263 days	
Minister for Environment and Heritage	James Griffin	Liberal	Perrottet (2)	21 December 2021	28 March 2023	1 year, 97 days	
Minister for the Environment	Penny Sharpe	Labor	Minns	28 March 2023	incumbent	3 years, 163 days	

== Former ministerial titles ==
=== Conservation ===
Ministerial title	Minister	Party	Ministry	Term start	Term end	Time in office	Notes
Minister for Conservation	Bill Dunn	Labor	McKell (1)	8 June 1944	9 May 1946	1 year, 335 days	
Minister for Conservation	George Weir	Labor	McKell (1) (2); McGirr (1) (2) (3)	9 May 1946	3 November 1952	6 years, 178 days	
Minister for Conservation	George Enticknap	Labor	McGirr (3); Cahill (1) (2)	3 November 1952	15 March 1956	3 years, 133 days	
Minister for Conservation	Ernest Wetherell	Labor	Cahill (3) (4); Heffron (1)	15 March 1956	31 May 1960	4 years, 77 days	
Minister for Conservation	George Enticknap	Labor	Heffron (1) (2); Renshaw	31 May 1960	13 May 1965	4 years, 347 days	
Minister for Conservation	Jack Beale	Liberal	Askin (1) (2) (3)	13 May 1965	11 March 1971	5 years, 302 days	
Minister for Conservation	Wal Fife	Liberal	Askin (4)	11 March 1971	19 June 1972	1 year, 100 days	
Minister for Conservation	George Freudenstein	Country	Askin (4) (5) (6)	19 June 1972	3 January 1975	2 years, 198 days	
Minister for Conservation	Lin Gordon	Labor	Wran (1) (2)	14 May 1976	29 February 1980	3 years, 291 days	
Minister for Conservation and Land Management	Garry West	National	Greiner (1) (2); Fahey (1) (2)	6 June 1991	26 May 1993	1 year, 354 days	
Minister for Land and Water Conservation	George Souris	National	Fahey (3)	26 May 1993	4 April 1995	1 year, 313 days	
Minister for Land and Water Conservation	Kim Yeadon	Labor	Carr (1)	4 April 1995	1 December 1997	2 years, 241 days	
Minister for Land and Water Conservation	Richard Amery	Labor	Carr (1)	1 December 1997	21 November 2001	3 years, 355 days	
Minister for Land and Water Conservation	John Aquilina	Labor	Carr (2) (3)	21 November 2001	2 April 2003	1 year, 132 days	
