= Wran ministry (1980–1981) =

Government of New South Wales, Australia

Third Wran ministry
- 73rd Cabinet of Government of New South Wales

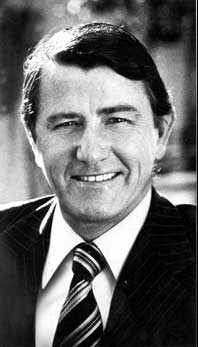
- Premier Neville Wran
- Date formed: 29 February 1980
- Date dissolved: 2 October 1981

People and organisations
- Monarch: Queen Elizabeth II
- Governor: Sir Roden Cutler; Sir James Rowland
- Premier: Neville Wran
- Deputy Premier: Jack Ferguson
- No. of ministers: 19
- Member party: Labor
- Opposition parties: Liberal National coalition
- Opposition leader: Bruce McDonald; John Mason

History
- Predecessor: Second Wran ministry
- Successor: Fourth Wran ministry

The Wran ministry (1980–1981) or Third Wran ministry was the 73rd ministry of the New South Wales Government, and was led by the 35th Premier of New South Wales, Neville Wran, representing the Labor Party. It was the third of eight consecutive occasions when Wran was Premier.

== Background ==
Wran had been elected to the Legislative Council of New South Wales by a joint sitting of the New South Wales Parliament on 12 March 1970. He was Leader of the Opposition in the Legislative Council from 22 February 1972. He resigned from the council on 19 October 1973 to switch to the Legislative Assembly, successfully contesting the election for Bass Hill, which he would hold until his retirement in 1986. Wran successfully challenged Pat Hills to become Leader of Labor Party and Leader of the Opposition from 3 December 1973 and became Premier following a narrow one seat victory at the 1976 election.

Labor retained government at the 1978 election in a landslide victory, popularly known as the "Wranslide", with a majority of 14 seats in the Legislative Assembly and four seats in the Legislative Council.

The reconfiguration of the ministry was triggered by the resignation of former Premier Jack Renshaw.

== Composition of ministry ==
The ministry covers the period from 29 February 1980 until 2 October 1981 when the Wran–led Labor Party was re-elected at the 1981 election, and the Fourth Wran ministry was formed.

Portfolio	Minister	Party	Term commence	Term end	Term of office
Premier; Treasurer	Neville Wran	Labor	29 February 1980	2 October 1981	1 year, 216 days
Deputy Premier; Minister for Public Works; Minister for Ports	Jack Ferguson (Note: Retained portfolios from the second Wran ministry.)	Labor	29 February 1980	2 October 1981	1 year, 216 days
Minister for Transport	Peter Cox	Labor	29 February 1980	2 October 1981	1 year, 216 days
Attorney General; Minister for Justice	Frank Walker	Labor	29 February 1980	2 October 1981	1 year, 216 days
Minister for Industrial Relations; Minister for Energy	Pat Hills	Labor	29 February 1980	2 October 1981	1 year, 216 days
Minister for Education; Vice-President of the Executive Council; Leader of the Government in Legislative Council	Paul Landa, MLC	Labor	29 February 1980	2 October 1981	1 year, 216 days
Minister for Industrial Development; Minister for Decentralisation	Don Day	Labor	29 February 1980	2 October 1981	1 year, 216 days
Minister for Planning and Environment	Eric Bedford	Labor	29 February 1980	2 October 1981	1 year, 216 days
Minister for Local Government; Minister for Roads	Harry Jensen	Labor	29 February 1980	2 October 1981	1 year, 216 days
Minister for Police; Minister for Services	Bill Crabtree	Labor	29 February 1980	2 October 1981	1 year, 216 days
Minister for Health	Kevin Stewart	Labor	29 February 1980	2 October 1981	1 year, 216 days
Minister for Consumer Affairs	Syd Einfeld	Labor	29 February 1980	2 October 1981	1 year, 216 days
Minister for Mineral Resources; Minister for Technology	Ron Mulock	Labor	29 February 1980	2 October 1981	1 year, 216 days
Minister for Sport and Recreation; Minister for Tourism; Assistant Treasurer	Ken Booth	Labor	29 February 1980	2 October 1981	1 year, 216 days
Minister for Lands; Minister for Forests; Minister for Water Resources	Lin Gordon	Labor	29 February 1980	2 October 1981	1 year, 216 days
Minister for Youth and Community Services	Rex Jackson	Labor	29 February 1980	2 October 1981	1 year, 216 days
Minister for Corrective Services	Bill Haigh	Labor	29 February 1980	2 October 1981	1 year, 216 days
Minister for Agriculture	Jack Hallam, MLC	Labor	29 February 1980	2 October 1981	1 year, 216 days
Minister for Housing; Minister for Co-operative Societies; Assistant Minister for Transport	Terry Sheahan	Labor	29 February 1980	2 October 1981	1 year, 216 days

Ministers are members of the Legislative Assembly unless otherwise noted.

== See also ==
- Members of the New South Wales Legislative Assembly, 1978–1981
- Members of the New South Wales Legislative Council, 1978–1981

== Notes ==
Preceded by Second Wran ministry (1978–1980)	Third Wran ministry 1980–1981	Succeeded by Fourth Wran ministry (1981–1983)
