= John Lloyd Waddy =

Royal Australian Air Force fighter pilot and New South Wales parliamentarian

John Waddy OBE, DFC
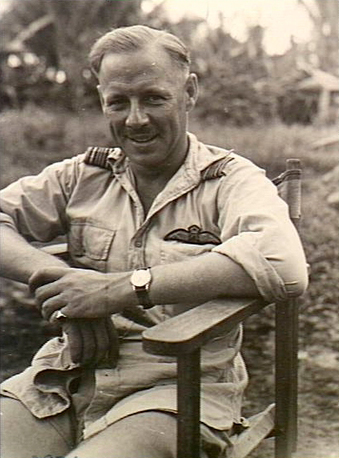
- Squadron Leader Waddy at Morotai c. 1945

Member of the New South Wales Parliament for Kirribilli
- In office 3 March 1962 – 2 April 1976
- Preceded by: New district
- Succeeded by: Bruce McDonald

Personal details
- Born: 10 December 1916 Sydney, New South Wales
- Died: 11 September 1987 (aged 70) Goulburn, New South Wales
- Party: Liberal Party
- Nickname: "Wad"

Military service
- Allegiance: Australia
- Branch/service: Royal Australian Air Force
- Service years: 1940–54
- Rank: Group Captain
- Unit: No. 250 Squadron RAF (1941–42); No. 260 Squadron RAF (1942); No. 4 Squadron SAAF (1942); No. 92 Squadron RAF (1942); No. 2 OTU (1943–44)
- Commands: No. 80 Squadron (1944–45); RAAF Reserve (1950–54)
- Battles/wars: World War II; Middle Eastern theatre; Desert War; South West Pacific theatre; New Guinea campaign; Borneo campaign
- Awards: Officer of the Order of the British Empire; Distinguished Flying Cross; Mentioned in Despatches; Air Medal (US)

John Lloyd Waddy, OBE, DFC (10 December 1916 – 11 September 1987) was a senior officer and aviator in the Royal Australian Air Force (RAAF), and later served as a member of the New South Wales Legislative Assembly and as a minister in the New South Wales government. As a fighter pilot during World War II, he shot down 15 enemy aircraft during the North African campaign, becoming one of Australia's top-scoring aces and earning the Distinguished Flying Cross. Waddy went on to command No. 80 Squadron in the South West Pacific, where he was awarded the US Air Medal. He was one of eight senior pilots who took part in the "Morotai Mutiny" of April 1945.

Discharged from the Permanent Air Force at the end of the war, Waddy took a commission in the RAAF Reserve and led the organisation as a group captain in the early 1950s. He was active in business and in veterans' groups, and was appointed an Officer of the Order of the British Empire in 1955. From 1962 to 1976, he was the Member for Kirribilli in the New South Wales Parliament, representing the Liberal Party. He held cabinet posts including Minister for Child Welfare and Social Welfare (later Youth and Community Services), Minister for Health, and Minister for Police and Services. Waddy retired from politics in 1976, and died in 1987 at the age of 70.

== Family and early life ==
Born in Sydney on 10 December 1916, Waddy was the son of first-class cricketer Edgar Lloyd Waddy and his wife Lottchen, and great-grandson of General Sir Richard Waddy, KCB. His four siblings included a sister and three brothers. Edgar Waddy established the real estate firm of E.L. Waddy & Son in Rose Bay, which John joined as a clerk after completing his education at the King's School, Parramatta. He married Vera Nellie May (Ve) Dengate on 21 July 1938. The couple had a son, Lloyd, and two daughters, Denise and Rosalind.

Waddy enlisted in the Royal Australian Air Force (RAAF) in late 1940, learning to fly under the Empire Air Training Scheme (EATS) in Southern Rhodesia. His two older brothers, Edgar and Richard, were also pilots. Edgar had taken a short-service commission with the Royal Air Force (RAF) in the 1930s, and Richard trained in Canada with EATS during the war before active duty in Britain, where he was killed flying a single-engined fighter in 1941. Waddy's elder sister, Lett, was commissioned into the Women's Volunteer Naval Reserve, and his younger brother Rowen served as an officer with Z Special Unit in the South West Pacific.

== World War II ==
=== North Africa ===
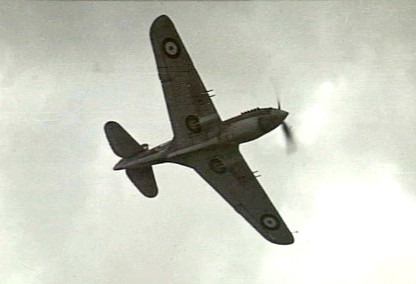
P-40 Tomahawk similar to that flown by John Waddy in No. 250 Squadron RAF, 1941

Completing his training in June 1941, Pilot Officer Waddy was posted to the North African theatre with No. 250 (Fighter) Squadron RAF, operating P-40 Tomahawks and, later, Kittyhawks. He was befriended and mentored by the RAAF's top-scoring ace, Clive "Killer" Caldwell, who became godfather to Waddy's daughter. Waddy's first operational sortie was as Caldwell's wingman; he found the ensuing dogfight so fast and confusing that he had no idea what was happening and afterwards had to ask the more experienced pilot how things had gone. On 9 December, he registered his first victory—in a Tomahawk that had previously been Caldwell's personal mount—when he shared in the destruction of a Messerschmitt Bf 110 twin-engined fighter near El Adem.

By the end of April 1942, Waddy had scored four-and-a-half victories over enemy aircraft. Promoted flying officer, he achieved four "kills" in a single sortie on 12 May 1942, destroying two Junkers Ju 52 cargo planes and two escorting Bf 110s from a German air transport convoy operating between Crete and North Africa. He was awarded the Distinguished Flying Cross (DFC) for this action, gazetted on 2 October. The citation praised his "masterly airmanship as a fighter pilot" and his "great courage and devotion to duty". Shortly after claiming a victory over a Messerschmitt Bf 109 on 22 May, Waddy was posted to another RAF unit, No. 260 Squadron, flying Kittyhawks. He accounted for two enemy aircraft in June, before being assigned to No. 4 Squadron, South African Air Force, with which he destroyed a Bf 109 in September. In October, Waddy began flying Spitfire Vs in No. 92 Squadron RAF. He claimed a further three victories with his latest unit before being posted back to Australia on 19 November 1942. His final tally of fifteen and a half victories made him one of the most successful Allied fighter pilots in the Desert War, and second only to Caldwell among the RAAF contingent.

=== South West Pacific ===
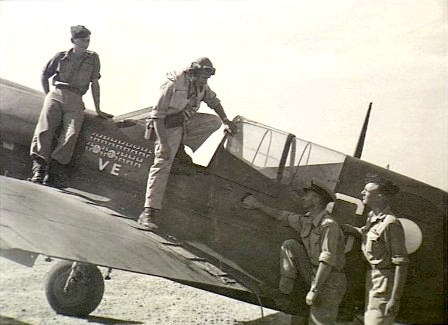
Waddy as CO of No. 80 Squadron at Morotai in 1945, emerging from his P-40 Kittyhawk. The aircraft is emblazoned with his tally of victories in the Desert War and "VE", the name of his wife.

In February 1943, Waddy took charge of the Spitfire Squadron of No. 2 Operational Training Unit (No. 2 OTU), based at Mildura, Victoria. He was quoted in The Canberra Times that April offering his message of congratulation to the RAF on the 25th anniversary of its foundation: "You should not have many more birthdays before 'Jerry' and the Japs are shot clean out of the skies. Here's hoping." Fellow aces and Desert War veterans Clive Caldwell, Wilf Arthur and Bobby Gibbes were also instructors at No. OTU before their combat postings in the South West Pacific; in December 1943, Caldwell and Waddy nearly collided when they crossed paths during an aerobatics display at No. 5 Service Flying Training School in Uranquinty, New South Wales. Waddy undertook a staff course the following year, and was promoted to squadron leader. He was posted to Noemfoor in the Dutch East Indies in September 1944 to command No. 80 Squadron; his unit was part of No. 78 (Fighter) Wing of the Australian First Tactical Air Force (No. 1 TAF), led by Air Commodore Harry Cobby. Operating Kittyhawks, No. 80 Squadron undertook dive bombing and strafing missions against Japanese targets, but saw little air combat.

In April 1945, Waddy joined Caldwell, Arthur, Gibbes and four other senior pilots of No. 1 TAF in an action that became known as the "Morotai Mutiny". The eight attempted to resign their commissions in protest at the relegation of the RAAF's fighter squadrons to apparently worthless ground attack missions. Earlier that month, Waddy had asked his intelligence officer to produce a "profit and loss statement" for No. 80 Squadron, covering the period 1 October 1944 to 31 March 1945, to "bring out the fact that the expenditure by the squadron was not compensated for by the achievements of the Squadron". In that time, Waddy had lost eleven pilots with the unit, including seven to enemy action. Arthur had produced a similar "balance sheet" for No. 81 Wing. Both had become frustrated with the lack of attention paid by superior officers to their concerns regarding the usefulness of No. 1 TAF operations. At the subsequent inquiry into events on Morotai, Justice John Vincent Barry cleared the pilots of fault over the incident, finding their motives in tendering their resignations to be sincere. Waddy continued to lead No. 80 Squadron until handing over command on 1 June 1945. For his service in the Pacific, he was mentioned in despatches and awarded the US Air Medal, the former promulgated on 25 June 1946 and the latter on 1 July 1948.

== Post-war career ==
=== RAAF reservist and businessman ===
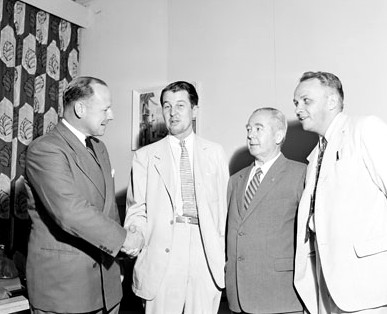
Waddy (far left) greeting members of the World Veterans Federation in 1956

With the end of the Pacific War, Waddy was discharged from the Permanent Air Force (PAF) as an acting wing commander in September 1945. He joined the Rose Bay branch of the Liberal Party, and accepted a commission in the RAAF Reserve, also known as the Citizen Air Force (CAF). He also worked as a sales executive in the import-export firm of Falkiner, Caldwell Pty Ltd, run by Clive Caldwell and businessman George Falkiner. Promoted group captain, Waddy led the CAF from 1950 through 1954, becoming its first member to take a seat on the Air Board, the RAAF's controlling body that consisted of its most senior officers and which was chaired by the Chief of the Air Staff. During his tenure, CAF squadrons continued to operate aircraft and were expected to act as home defence in the absence of PAF units serving overseas, roles they would lose by the end of the 1950s.

Retiring from the CAF in 1954, Waddy established his own real estate and travel agency, John L. Waddy Pty Ltd, and served as Honorary Aide-de-camp to the Queen until 1957. He was appointed an Officer of the Order of the British Empire in the 1955 New Year Honours. The Australian delegate to the World Veterans Federation from 1956 to 1963, he was President of the New South Wales Division of the Australian Flying Corps and Royal Australian Air Force Association throughout the 1950s, becoming an honorary life member in 1958. In October 1956, he joined former Chiefs of the Air Staff Air Marshals Sir Richard Williams and Sir George Jones in calling for greater investment in the local aircraft industry, warning that unless prompt action was taken the situation would deteriorate to the same level as before World War II.

=== State parliamentarian ===
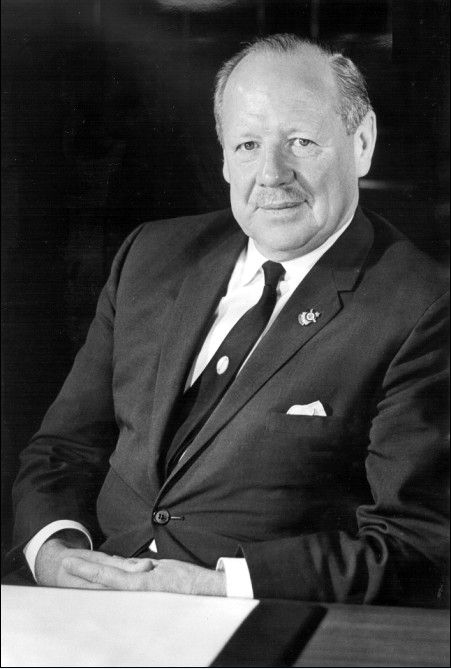
Waddy's official New South Wales Parliament portrait, 1971

After an unsuccessful bid to become Lord Mayor of Sydney that saw him defeated by the Labor Party's Pat Hills, Waddy was elected to the New South Wales Legislative Assembly as the Liberal member for the newly created seat of Kirribilli, on Sydney's North Shore, in March 1962. He sold his interest in John L. Waddy Pty Ltd the same year. Appointed Parliamentary Secretary to the Minister for Education in 1967, he was an Assistant Minister from February 1969 until March 1971, when he became a Minister of the Crown in charge of Child Welfare and Social Welfare in Premier Robert Askin's cabinet, succeeding Frederick Hewitt. His portfolio included responsibility for Aboriginal affairs; in 1972 he founded the Aboriginal Lands Trust, staffed by a council of nine elected Indigenous Australians, to assume freehold title of former government reserves in New South Wales as a precursor to granting land rights.

Waddy's position was changed to Minister for Youth and Community Services in January 1973. In September he piloted a bill to reorganise the Ministries of Child Welfare and Social Welfare as the Department of Youth and Community Services; the move was designed to "revitalise" and re-focus welfare services, and to remove "overtones of charity and paternalism" inherent in the earlier titles. Waddy was succeeded by Dick Healey on 3 December 1973, and took over as Minister for Health from Harry Jago. On 3 January 1975, he was appointed Minister for Police and Minister for Services under new Premier Tom Lewis, serving until 23 January the following year. In this portfolio he sponsored an amendment to the Parliamentary Electorates and Elections Bill, including provisions to close polling booths at 6 pm rather than 8 pm to expedite the reporting of results, and to change the term "Christian name" to "Given name" on candidate nominations to reflect changing community attitudes. He also put through a bill to hold a referendum on whether to make daylight saving a permanent fixture in New South Wales, following trials that had commenced in 1971.

Described by one of his parliamentary colleagues as a "mixture of bon vivant and conservatism", Waddy was also known for an occasionally quick temper; his staff were said to "start making motions as though they were bombing and strafing the enemy" when their boss got "wound up". Charles Cutler, New South Wales Deputy Premier from 1965 to 1975, reflecting on the bond between ex-servicemen in the political arena, recalled Waddy as "a great bloke, but inclined to be a bit pompous when speaking in the house ...", and John Booth found him to have an "old-fashioned sense of service to the community". Waddy was named a Freeman of the City of London in 1972, and Australian Father of the Year in 1973. Having held his state seat in Kirribilli for fourteen years and four re-election campaigns—in 1965, 1968, 1971 and 1973—he was denied preselection by the Liberal Party for the 1976 contest. He resigned from the party and stood as an Independent, but was defeated by future Liberal leader Bruce McDonald. His parliamentary career was over but, in the words of a later Deputy Premier, Ian Armstrong, Waddy had "refused to retreat to political obscurity", and "went out fighting". He was permitted to continue to use the title "Honourable" on his retirement. After eleven years in power in New South Wales, the sitting Liberal government itself lost office in the 1976 poll, to Neville Wran's Labor Party.

== Later life ==
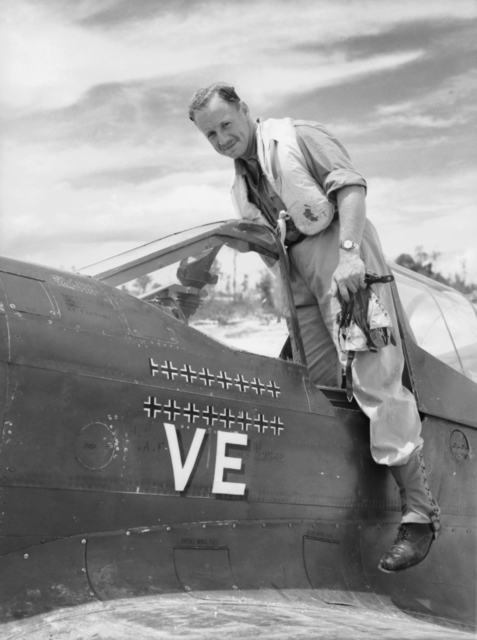
Waddy at Noemfoor, 1944

Waddy maintained his interest in aviation during and after his political career. He flew a Beechcraft King Air twin-engined turboprop in the 1969 England-to-Australia Air Race, taking second prize in the New South Wales Government division. As Minister for Child Welfare and Social Welfare with responsibility for Aboriginal affairs in 1971, he piloted his own light plane on three of the longest legs of his tour of government reserves in rural New South Wales. Chairman of the executive committee of the Australian and British Guild of Air Pilots and Air Navigators in 1977–78, he was an honorary member of the American Fighter Aces Association, and became director of a private airline, Aquatic Airways, in 1979. He also raised cattle on his farm near Goulburn, New South Wales.

Following several bouts of serious illness in his later years, John Waddy died on 11 September 1987, at the age of seventy. He was survived by his wife and three children, and given a funeral at St Andrew's Cathedral, Sydney. His pallbearers included Clive Caldwell and Tom Lewis. Waddy's son Lloyd served in the RAAF Reserve from 1979 to 1995, and was appointed Queen's Counsel in 1988 and later a Justice of the Family Court of Australia. He was also a co-founder and National Convenor of Australians for Constitutional Monarchy. Waddy's widow Ve died in 2006, at the age of ninety-six.

== Notes ==
New South Wales Legislative Assembly
New district	Member for Kirribilli; 1962–1976	Succeeded by Bruce McDonald
Political offices
Preceded by Frederick Hewitt	Minister for Child Welfare; 1971–1973	Succeeded by Himself as Minister for Youth and Community Services
Preceded by Frederick Hewitt	Minister for Social Welfare; 1971–1973	Succeeded by Himself as Minister for Youth and Community Services
Preceded by Himself as Minister for Child Welfare and Social Welfare	Minister for Youth and Community Services; 1973	Succeeded by Dick Healey
Preceded by Harry Jago	Minister for Health; 1973–1975	Succeeded by Dick Healey
New title	Minister for Police; 1975–1976	Succeeded by Bill Crabtree
New title	Minister for Services; 1975–1976	Succeeded by Ron Mulock
