= Arthur Bridges =

Australian politician

The Honourable Arthur Bridges
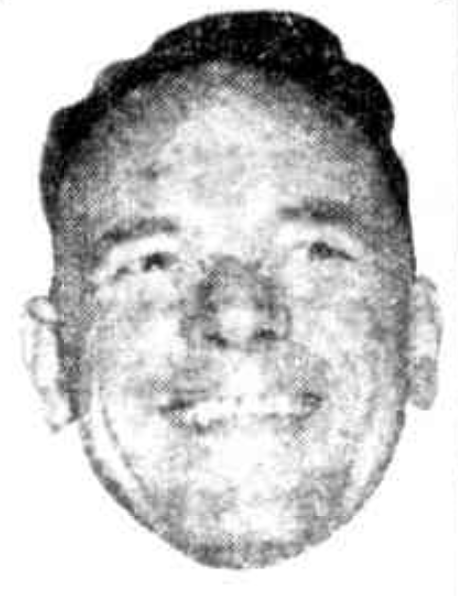
- Arthur Dalgety Bridges, MLC, c1954

Leader of the Government in the Legislative Council Vice-President of the Executive Council
- In office 13 May 1965 – 22 May 1968
- Premier: Robert Askin
- Preceded by: Reg Downing
- Succeeded by: John Fuller

Leader of the New South Wales Opposition in the Legislative Council
- In office 30 October 1962 – 13 May 1965
- Preceded by: Hector Clayton
- Succeeded by: Reg Downing

Member of the Legislative Council of New South Wales
- In office 23 April 1946 – 22 May 1968
- Succeeded by: Bernard Riley

Personal details
- Born: 19 November 1901 Sydney, Australia
- Died: 22 May 1968 (aged 66) Darlinghurst, New South Wales, Australia
- Spouse: Rachel Duckworth
- Occupation: Accountant

Arthur Dalgety Bridges (19 November 1901 – 22 May 1968) was an Australian Chartered accountant, company director and politician. He was a member of the New South Wales Legislative Council for the 22 years from 1946 to 1968 representing the Liberal Party, becoming Leader of the New South Wales Opposition in the Legislative Council from 1962 until 1965. He served as Leader of the Government in the council as well as on the Askin cabinet as Vice-President of the Executive Council and Minister for Child and Social Welfare from 1965 to his death in office in 1968.

== Early years and background ==
Arthur Dalgety Bridges was born in Sydney, New South Wales, in 1901, the son of schoolteacher Frederick Bridges and Ivy May Campbell. After being educated at Fort Street Boy's High School, Bridges worked for his brother on a citrus farm near Yenda, New South Wales. After qualifying as an accountant in 1924, Bridges rose to be a Fellow of the Institute of Chartered Accountants in Australia (FCA) and a Fellow of the Chartered Institute of Secretaries. Bridges also became established in his own firm, Bridges and Steel (later A.D Bridges & Co). Becoming recognised as a leading financial adviser, Bridges served as a director of numerous companies in a variety of areas. He married Rachel Duckworth on 2 November 1929 and had a daughter and a son.

== Political career ==
A committed Presbyterian, Bridges would eventually become treasurer of Presbyterian church of New South Wales and a National Councillor from 1927 until 1932. Through this, Bridges joined the conservative United Australia Party and its successor, the Democratic Party. As a councillor in both parties, Bridges was a member of the committee which established Liberal Party in 1945–46. Initially serving as a councillor, Bridges rose to be New South Wales vice-president and a Federal Councillor from 1946 until 1965.

Bridges was elected to the indirectly elected New South Wales Legislative Council on 14 March 1946 and took his seat on 23 April 1946. Bridges eventually replaced Hector Clayton as Liberal leader in the Council in 1962, thereby becoming Leader of the New South Wales Opposition in the Legislative Council. He served thus until May 1962, when Liberal leader Robert Askin led the Liberal/Country Coalition to victory at the 1965 election. As the now Leader of the Government in the Legislative Council, Bridges was sworn into the cabinet as Vice-President of the Executive Council and as Minister for Child Welfare and Social Welfare.

While in parliament, Bridges was vice-president of the Royal Blind Society an honorary secretary of Blinded Ex-serviceman's Club, a committee member of Red Cross Blood Transfusion Service, the vice-president of Young Men's Christian Association and a fellow of Senate of University of Sydney from 1967 until 1968. Bridges served in government until his death in office aged 66 on 22 May 1968. On his death, Premier Askin noted that he had "an apparently inexhaustible energy which was a source of wonder to all who knew him" while the leader of the opposition Labor Party, Pat Hills, lamented: "Of all the sad occasions which have come upon this venerable House of Parliament, none was so universally felt as the news of the death of our late colleague".

Political offices
Preceded by Hector Clayton	Leader of the Opposition of New South Wales in the Legislative Council; 1962 – 1965	Succeeded by Reg Downing
Preceded by Reg Downing as Representative of the Government	Leader of the Government in the Legislative Council; 1965 – 1968	Succeeded by John Fuller
Preceded by Reg Downing as Representative of the Government	Vice-President of the Executive Council; 1965 – 1968	Succeeded by John Fuller
Preceded by Frank Hawkins	Minister for Child Welfare; 1965 – 1968	Succeeded by Harry Jago
Preceded by Frank Hawkins	Minister for Social Welfare; 1965 – 1968	Succeeded by Harry Jago
Party political offices
Preceded by Hector Clayton	Leader of the Liberal Party in the Legislative Council; 1962 – 1968	Succeeded by Frederick Hewitt
