= Tim Bruxner =

Australian politician

The Honourable Tim Bruxner

Minister for Transport Minister for Highways
- In office 23 January 1976 – 14 May 1976
- Premier: Sir Eric Willis
- Preceded by: Max Ruddock
- Succeeded by: Peter Cox

Minister for Decentralisation and Development
- In office 3 December 1973 – 23 January 1976
- Premier: Sir Robert Askin; Tom Lewis
- Preceded by: John Fuller
- Succeeded by: Milton Morris

Member of the New South Wales Parliament for Tenterfield
- In office 3 March 1962 – 28 August 1981
- Preceded by: Michael Bruxner
- Succeeded by: District abolished

Personal details
- Born: 18 May 1923 Tenterfield, New South Wales, Australia
- Died: 22 August 2017 (aged 94) Sydney
- Party: Country
- Spouse: Margaret McLeish
- Relations: Sir Michael Bruxner (Father); John Bruxner (Brother)

Military service
- Allegiance: Australia
- Branch/service: Australian Army; Royal Australian Air Force
- Years of service: 1941–1945
- Rank: Pilot Officer
- Unit: 2/9th Armoured Regiment; No. 7 Operational Training Unit RAAF
- Battles/wars: World War II

James Caird "Tim" Bruxner (18 May 1923 – 22 August 2017) was an Australian politician who was a member of the New South Wales Legislative Assembly from 3 March 1962 to 28 August 1981 and the Deputy Leader of the Country Party and its successors in New South Wales from 1975 to 1981.

Bruxner held positions as a Minister of the Crown for Housing, Cooperative Societies, Decentralisation and Development and Tourism in the cabinets of Sir Robert Askin and Tom Lewis. Under Sir Eric Willis, Bruxner was promoted as Minister for Transport and Minister for Highways. Upon losing government in 1976, Bruxner continued as Deputy Leader and Shadow Minister until his retirement from politics in 1981.

== Early life and background ==
James Caird Bruxner, better known as 'Tim' (which was an old family nickname), was born 18 May 1923 in Tenterfield, New South Wales, the youngest son of NSW Country Party leader Michael Frederick Bruxner, who had served as Deputy Premier of New South Wales between 1932 and 1941, and Winifred Hay "Midge" Caird. His brother, John Michael Bruxner, later became a Judge of the District Court of New South Wales. He spent his early years on the family property "Roseneath", until he left to attend Cranbrook School, Sydney, becoming School Captain in 1940.

He began to study law at the University of Sydney, but interrupted his studies to serve in the Australian military during World War II. Volunteering for overseas service, he enlisted in the 2nd Australian Imperial Force on 13 December 1941, and was posted to the 1st Armoured Division's 2/9th Armoured Regiment, serving as a corporal. Leaving the Army on 10 July 1944, Bruxner joined the Royal Australian Air Force, 7th Operational Training Unit, as a Pilot Officer. On 18 April 1945, Bruxner married Margaret Ann McLeish, with whom he had a son. Upon being discharged on 15 October 1945, Bruxner became a grazier as the owner of 'Old Auburnvale' station near Inverell, where he was a breeder of Aberdeen Angus cattle.

== Political career ==
When his father, Sir Michael Bruxner, retired from parliament on 5 February 1962, Bruxner gained preselection for his father's vacated seat of Tenterfield, allegedly against his parents' advice, and won it at the 1962 election for the Country Party with 50.75% of the vote. Serving in the backbenches in opposition, Bruxner was re-elected at the 1965 election with an increased margin of 57.1% of the vote. As a junior member of parliament, Bruxner continued in the backbenches when the Coalition took power under Robert Askin in 1965. He was re-elected again at the 1968 and 1971 elections with 66.9% and 56.9% respectively.

At the 1973 election, Bruxner was returned with 68.63% in Tenterfield. This time Premier Askin promoted him to Cabinet as the Minister for Housing and Minister for Cooperative Societies, which he held from 17 January 1973 to 3 December 1973, when he was further promoted as Minister for Decentralisation and Development, which was centred on the growth areas of Albury-Wodonga and Bathurst-Orange as well as overall government development across the state. On 16 December 1975, the Leader of the New South Wales Country Party, Sir Charles Cutler, retired. Bruxner put his name down to succeed Cutler as Leader, but was defeated by the Deputy Leader, Leon Punch. Bruxner then contested the vacant Deputy Leadership position against George Freudenstein. Defeating Freudenstein, Bruxner became the Deputy Leader of the renamed National Country Party. On 17 December 1975, in addition to his responsibilities for Decentralisation and Development, the new Premier, Tom Lewis, appointed him as the Minister for Tourism, which had been vacated by Cutler. A month later, on 22 January 1976, Lewis was deposed as Premier and Liberal Leader by several backbenchers and was succeeded by Education Minister Sir Eric Willis. Willis then appointed Bruxner as Minister for Transport and Minister for Highways in his new government on 23 January.

As the new Minister for Transport and Highways, Bruxner was the fourth Minister of that portfolio in a year and started amid speculation that he had been given the job to take the mess of transport, which was largely seen as a 'bad news' portfolio, away from the Liberal Party and offload it to the Country Party. Nevertheless, Bruxner took it in his stride, adopting his father's maxim that "We can't please everyone. Let us... go like the devil straight ahead." and oversaw the announcement of the Premier's Sydney Transport masterplan. Inheriting a department that was in "dire financial straits", Bruxner found it difficult to make an impression before the Willis Government was defeated at the election on 14 May 1976.

== Later life ==
In opposition, Bruxner was appointed by Opposition leader Willis as Shadow Minister for Decentralisation and Development and Primary Industries. He served in this capacity under the successive Leadership of Peter Coleman until 2 November 1978. When Coleman lost his seat at the 1978 election, he was succeeded by John Mason, who appointed him as Shadow Leader of the House.

When the electoral redistribution results were published in March 1980, Tenterfield was abolished, with most going into the re-established electorate of Northern Tablelands. With this in mind, Bruxner considered his position on whether to stand again at the next election. Eventually he decided to retire as an MP and as Deputy Leader to allow younger members of the party to gain experience. Following the landslide loss at the September 1981 election, the National Country Party and the Liberals both held 14 seats. Party Leader Leon Punch then contested the vacant Leadership of the Opposition, a move which former deputy Bruxner opposed, but lost to the new leader of the Liberals, John Dowd. On his retirement, he was granted by Queen Elizabeth II, on the Governor's recommendation, retention of the title "The Honourable" for life. After leaving politics, Bruxner retired from public life and returned to his property near Inverell. He died in 2017.

== Notes ==
New South Wales Legislative Assembly
Preceded by Michael Bruxner	Member for Tenterfield; 1962–1981	District abolished
Political offices
Preceded by Stanley Stephens	Minister for Housing; 1973	Succeeded by Laurie McGinty
Preceded by Stanley Stephens	Minister for Co-operative Societies; 1973	Succeeded by Laurie McGinty
Preceded by John Fuller	Minister for Decentralisation and Development; 1973–1976	Succeeded by Milton Morris
Preceded by Sir Charles Cutler	Minister for Tourism; 1975–1976	Succeeded by David Arblaster
Preceded by Max Ruddock	Minister for Transport; 1976	Succeeded by Peter Cox
Preceded by Max Ruddock	Minister for Highways; 1976	Succeeded by Peter Cox
Party political offices
Preceded by Leon Punch	Deputy Leader of the New South Wales National Country Party; 1975–1981	Succeeded by Wal Murray
