= John Fuller (Australian politician) =

Australian politician (1917–2009)

The Honourable Sir John Fuller

Leader of the Government in the Legislative Council
- In office 10 July 1968 – 14 May 1976
- Preceded by: Arthur Bridges
- Succeeded by: Paul Landa

Leader of the Opposition in the Legislative Council
- In office 14 May 1976 – 1 August 1978
- Preceded by: Leroy Serisier
- Succeeded by: Max Willis

Member of the Legislative Council of New South Wales
- In office 23 April 1961 – 1 August 1978

Personal details
- Born: 22 September 1917 Mosman, New South Wales
- Died: 31 January 2009 (aged 91) Sydney, New South Wales, Australia
- Party: Country Party
- Spouse: Eileen Webb
- Occupation: Farmer

Sir John Bryan Munro Fuller (22 September 1917 – 31 January 2009) was an Australian politician, a member of the New South Wales Legislative Council for the Country Party from 1961 to 1978.

== Early years ==
Fuller was born in the Sydney suburb of Mosman in 1917, and was educated at Knox Grammar School at Wahroonga. Following his schooling, he worked in rural New South Wales and Queensland, before acquiring and settling on a farm property at Coolah. A member of the NSW Country Party since 1940, he served as a councillor on the Coolah Shire Council from 1955 to 1965.

== Political career ==
He was elected to the New South Wales Legislative Council on 23 April 1961. During his term he served as Minister for Decentralisation and Development (1965–1973), Deputy Leader of the Government in the Legislative Council (1966–1968), Minister for Planning and Environment (1973–1976), Vice-President of the Executive Council and Leader of the Government in the Legislative Council (1968–1976) and Leader of the Opposition in the Legislative Council (1976–1978).

After retiring from politics, Fuller remained actively involved in charities and organisations such as the Australian Monarchist League. He died on 31 January 2009, aged 91, after a long battle with cancer.

== Honours ==
Fuller was made a Knight Bachelor on 1 January 1974 for his work as NSW Minister for Development. He was also awarded the Queen Elizabeth II Silver Jubilee Medal in 1977.

Political offices
Preceded by Jack Renshaw as Minister for Industrial Development and Decentralisation	Minister for Decentralisation and Development; 1965–1973	Succeeded by Tim Bruxner
New portfolio	Minister for Planning and Environment; 1973–1976	Succeeded by Paul Landa
New South Wales Legislative Council
New office	Deputy Leader of the Government; 1966–1968	Succeeded by Frederick Hewitt
Preceded by Arthur Bridges	Leader of the Government; 1968–1976	Succeeded by Tim Bruxner
Preceded by Leroy Serisier	Leader of the Opposition; 1976–1978	Succeeded by Max Willis
