= Frederick Hewitt =

Australian company director and politician

The Honourable Frederick Hewitt

Minister for Social Welfare Minister for Child Welfare
- In office 3 September 1968 – 11 March 1971
- Premier: Robert Askin
- Preceded by: Harry Jago
- Succeeded by: John Lloyd Waddy

Minister for Labour and Industry
- In office 11 March 1971 – 14 May 1976
- Premier: Robert Askin; Tom Lewis; Sir Eric Willis
- Preceded by: Eric Willis
- Succeeded by: Paul Landa (as Minister for Industrial Relations)

Member of the Legislative Council of New South Wales
- In office 23 April 1955 – 31 July 1976
- Succeeded by: Peter Philips

Personal details
- Born: 11 July 1908 Muswellbrook, New South Wales, Australia
- Died: 22 November 1976 (aged 68) Manly, New South Wales, Australia
- Party: Liberal Party
- Spouse: Enid Brown
- Occupation: Company director
- Awards: Australia Service Medal

Military service
- Allegiance: Australia
- Branch/service: (Australia) Australian Army
- Years of service: 1942–1945
- Rank: Gunner
- Unit: 7th Battalion, Volunteer Defence Corps
- Battles/wars: World War II

Frederick Maclean ("Mac") Hewitt (11 July 1908 – 22 November 1976) was an Australian company director and politician. He was a member of the New South Wales Legislative Council for the 21 years from 1955 to 1976 representing the Liberal Party, serving as Leader of the Liberal Party in the council as well as on the Askin cabinet as Minister for Child and Social Welfare and later as Minister for Labour and Industry. He continued to serve in the Lewis and Willis cabinets in the portfolios of Labour and Industry, Consumer Affairs and Federal Affairs. Following the Coalition loss at the 1976 election, Hewitt continued to serve as Deputy Leader of the Opposition and leader of the Liberal Party in the council until his retirement, before his death a few months later.

== Early years and background ==
Mac Hewitt (as he was commonly known) was born in Muswellbrook in 1908, the son of grazier Frederick James Hewitt and Ida May Watt. Hewitt received his early education at Muswellbrook Public School and when his family moved to Neutral Bay in Sydney he received his education at Neutral Bay Superior Public School, and Neutral Bay Junior Technical School. Leaving school at age sixteen, Hewitt commenced work with the Commercial Banking Company of Sydney and continued to work there until 1945. On 19 January 1939 Hewitt married Enid Brown and they had one daughter and one son.

During the Second World War, Hewitt signed up to the 7th Battalion, Volunteer Defence Corps, as a Gunner part-time and served from 1942 to 1945. Following the war Hewitt became a company director for various companies including as assistant secretary of City and Suburban Timber Merchants (1954–1956), a director of Commonwealth New Guinea Timbers (1953–1968), and the Australian New Guinea Corporation (1961–1968).

== Political career ==
Hewitt joined the newly founded Liberal Party in 1945 and was a founding member of the Mosman branch of the party, eventually rising to a position on the party's State Council. His prominence in the local community and in business soon led to his election to the then indirectly elected Legislative Council of New South Wales on 25 November 1954, taking his seat on 23 April 1955. He continued his prominence in the Sydney business community while he was in office, becoming President of Sydney Junior Chamber of Commerce and president of Sydney Chamber of Commerce from 1966 to 1967 and as president of the Wine and Food Society of New South Wales (1960–1961).

Hewitt remained on the backbenches in the council however, until the death of Liberal colleague and Leader of the Government in the Council, Arthur Bridges, on 22 May 1968. Hewitt then succeeded in being elected to the role of leader of the Liberal Party in the council, but in a break from convention did not become Leader of the Government, which was instead taken by the more senior John Fuller, who was the leader of the Country Party in the council. As a result, Hewitt became Deputy Leader of the Government and was sworn into the cabinet of Robert Askin as Minister for Social Welfare and Minister for Child Welfare on 3 September 1968. He was also appointed to serve the remainder of Bridges' term on the Senate of the University of Sydney (1968–1976).

On 11 March 1971, Hewitt was promoted to the more senior position as Minister for Labour and Industry. As the Minister responsible for industrial relations laws, Hewitt introduced the Industrial Arbitration (Amendment) Bill (1971), which introduced the secret ballot requirement for trade unions in polls on the question of strike action. This innovation, much to Hewitt's surprise, led to significant resistance from the trade union movement and the Labor Party. In response, Hewitt declared to the Sydney Morning Herald: "I'm NOT anti-union and I'm not a bogeyman. In fact I'm a bit astonished at the trauma [the bill] seems to have aroused." In the same article, The Herald opined that "A less bogeyman-like figure than Mr Hewitt would be hard to imagine. Unflappable he is called by one Cabinet colleague. Bland and imperturbable, with a dry sense of humour, he appears to be completely unmoved by the furore over the strike ballot legislation." A quiet and well-performing member of the cabinet, on 4 December 1973 Askin gave Hewitt an additional portfolio as the inaugural Minister for Consumer Affairs, and with Tom Lewis succeeding Askin as Premier, Hewitt was given the new position of Minister for Federal Affairs on 3 January 1975. As Minister for Federal Affairs, Hewitt led the Division of Federal Affairs within the Premier's Department and was responsible for inter-governmental relations between the State and Federal governments, this was the first time a government in Australia had created a portfolio with a specific responsibility for inter-governmental relations.

== Later life ==
He served in these roles through the ministry of Sir Eric Willis until the defeat of the government at the 1976 election, at which point he became the Deputy Leader of the Opposition in the Council. On his departure from the Ministry, Hewitt was permitted to retain the title "The Honourable" for life. However, Hewitt was to serve in opposition only briefly before his retirement on 31 July 1976. Hewitt was not able to enjoy retirement however as he died a few months later on 22 November 1976. On his death the new Premier Neville Wran said of Hewitt during his condolence motion in the Legislative Assembly: "He was a down-to-earth man and one who was well regarded, not only within the business world but also within the trade-union movement. Mac was a practical and realistic man. [...] It is a tragedy that Mac Hewitt's death came so soon after his retirement from the Legislative Council. He had earned his retirement. He had served his State and the Parliament and he had looked forward to many years in comfortable retirement – a retirement he had so justly earned."

Business positions
Preceded by D. F. L. McMurray	President of the Wine and Food Society of New South Wales; 1960 – 1961	Succeeded by Fergus Canny
Preceded by ??	President of the Sydney Chamber of Commerce; 1966 – 1967	Succeeded by ??
Political offices
Preceded by Harry Jago	Minister for Social Welfare; Minister for Child Welfare; 1968 – 1971	Succeeded by John Lloyd Waddy
Preceded by John Fuller	Deputy Leader of the Government in the Legislative Council; 1968 – 1976	Succeeded by Edna Roper
Preceded by Eric Willis	Minister for Labour and Industry; 1971 – 1976	Succeeded by Paul Landa as Minister for Industrial Relations
New title	Minister for Consumer Affairs; 1973 – 1976	Succeeded by Syd Einfeld
New title	Minister for Federal Affairs; 1975 – 1976	Post abolished
Preceded by Edna Roper	Deputy Leader of the Opposition in the Legislative Council; 1976	Succeeded by John Holt
Party political offices
Preceded by Arthur Bridges	Leader of the Liberal Party in the Legislative Council; 1968 – 1976	Succeeded by John Holt
