= Wal Fife =

Australian politician (1929–2017)

The Honourable Wal Fife
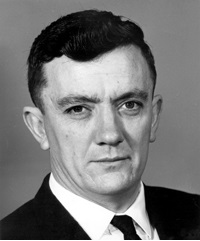

Manager of Opposition Business
- In office 14 August 1987 – 23 May 1992
- Leader: John Howard; Andrew Peacock; John Hewson
- Preceded by: John Spender
- Succeeded by: Warwick Smith

Minister for Aviation
- In office 7 May 1982 – 11 March 1983
- Prime Minister: Malcolm Fraser
- Preceded by: Charles Jones
- Succeeded by: Kim Beazley

Minister for Education
- In office 8 December 1979 – 7 May 1982
- Prime Minister: Malcolm Fraser
- Preceded by: John Carrick
- Succeeded by: Peter Baume

Minister for Consumer Affairs
- In office 17 July 1977 – 8 December 1979
- Prime Minister: Malcolm Fraser
- Preceded by: John Howard
- Succeeded by: Victor Garland

Member of the Australian Parliament for Farrer (1975-1984) & Hume (1984-1993)
- In office 13 December 1975 – 8 February 1993
- Preceded by: David Fairbairn (Farrer); Stephen Lusher (Hume)
- Succeeded by: Tim Fischer (Farrer); John Sharp (Hume)
NSW Minister 1965–1975
Minister for Transport Minister for Highways
In office 3 January 1975 – 10 October 1975
| Premier | Tom Lewis |
| Preceded by | Milton Morris (Transport); Charles Cutler (Highways) |
| Succeeded by | Max Ruddock |
Minister for Mines
In office 22 June 1967 – 3 January 1975
| Premier | Robert Askin |
| Preceded by | Tom Lewis |
| Succeeded by | George Freudenstein |
Minister for Power
In office 19 June 1972 – 3 January 1975
| Premier | Robert Askin |
| Succeeded by | George Freudenstein |
Assistant Treasurer
In office 19 June 1972 – 3 January 1975
| Premier | Robert Askin |
| Preceded by | George Freudenstein |
| Succeeded by | Max Ruddock |
Minister for Conservation
In office 19 June 1972 – 3 January 1975
| Premier | Robert Askin |
| Preceded by | Jack Beale |
| Succeeded by | George Freudenstein |
Assistant Minister for Education
In office 13 May 1965 – 27 June 1967
| Minister | Charles Cutler |
| Premier | Robert Askin |

Member of the New South Wales Legislative Assembly for Wagga Wagga
- In office 14 December 1957 – 15 October 1975
- Preceded by: Edgar Graham
- Succeeded by: Joe Schipp

Personal details
- Born: Wallace Clyde Fife; 2 October 1929 Wagga Wagga, New South Wales
- Died: 16 November 2017 (aged 88) Canberra, Australian Capital Territory
- Party: Liberal Party
- Spouse: Marcia Hargreaves Stanley
- Children: Two daughters; two sons.
- Occupation: Businessman

Wallace Clyde Fife (2 October 1929 – 16 November 2017) was an Australian politician and minister in the New South Wales Government and Federal Government. He served for 35 years as a Member in both the New South Wales Parliament and the Federal Parliament.

== Early life ==
Fife was born in Wagga Wagga, New South Wales, and was educated at Wagga Wagga Public School, Wagga Wagga and Canberra Grammar School. In 1948 he started working in the federal secretariat of the Liberal Party and in 1949 he joined his family business, Fifes Produce Pty Ltd, in Wagga Wagga. He married Marcia Hargreaves Stanley in May 1952 and they had two daughters and two sons.

== Political career ==
Fife was elected as the member for Wagga Wagga in the New South Wales Legislative Assembly in a 1957 by-election. He was Minister for Mines from June 1967 to January 1975, Minister for Conservation from March 1971 to June 1972, Minister for Power from June 1972 to January 1975 and Minister for Transport and Minister for Highways from January 1975 until his retirement from the New South Wales Parliament in October 1975. Under his ministership many rural railway stations were closed.

After the longtime member for the federal seat of Farrer, David Fairbairn, announced his retirement, Fife was pre-selected as the Liberal candidate for the next federal election.

Fife was elected to the Australian House of Representatives as the member for Farrer at the election on 13 December 1975. He was Minister for Business and Consumer Affairs from July 1977 to December 1979, Minister for Education from December 1979 to May 1982 and Minister for Aviation from May 1982 until the defeat of the Fraser government at the March 1983 election. Following an electoral distribution that moved Wagga Wagga into the Division of Hume, he stood for and won that seat at the 1984 election. His role in Opposition included a stint as Deputy Leader of the Opposition in the House of Representatives between May 1989 and April 1990, since Liberal deputy leader Fred Chaney was still a Senator.

Fife retired from parliament prior to the 1993 election. His departure came as a result of seat redistribution from which the National Party benefited; Wagga Wagga was moved to the safe National seat of Riverina. Fife was resentful to Liberal Leader John Hewson for not saving his career. Fife and others came to see Hewson's leadership as ineffective and Fife's departure was seen as evidence of Hewson not having much influence in the Liberal Party.

== Honours ==
- Honorary Doctor of Letters (HonDLitt) from Charles Sturt University.
- Centenary Medal (1 January 2001), "For service to Australian society through the Commonwealth and state parliaments and government".

== Notes ==
Parliament of New South Wales
New South Wales Legislative Assembly
| Preceded by Eddie Graham | Member for Wagga Wagga; 1957–1975 | Succeeded by Joe Schipp |
Political offices
| Vacant Title last held by Jack FitzGerald | Assistant Minister for Education; 1965–1967 | Vacant Title next held by Bob Debus |
| Preceded by Tom Lewis | Minister for Mines; 1967 – 1975 | Succeeded by George Freudenstein as Minister for Mines; Minister for Energy |
| New title | Minister for Power; 1972 – 1975 | Succeeded by George Freudenstein as Minister for Mines; Minister for Energy |
| Preceded by Jack Beale | Minister for Conservation; 1971–1972 | Succeeded by George Freudenstein |
| Preceded by George Freudenstein | Assistant Treasurer; 1972–1975 | Succeeded by Max Ruddock |
| Preceded by Milton Morris | Minister for Transport; 1975 | Succeeded by Max Ruddock |
| Preceded by Charles Cutler | Minister for Highways; 1975 | Succeeded by Max Ruddock |
Parliament of Australia
Australian House of Representatives
| Preceded by David Fairbairn | Member for Farrer; 1975–1984 | Succeeded by Tim Fischer |
| Preceded by Stephen Lusher | Member for Hume; 1984–1993 | Succeeded by John Sharp |
Political offices
| Preceded by John Howard | Minister for Business and Consumer Affairs; 1977–1979 | Succeeded by Victor Garland |
| Preceded by John Carrick | Minister for Education; 1979–1982 | Succeeded by Peter Baume |
| Preceded by Charles Jones | Minister for Aviation; 1982–1983 | Succeeded by Kim Beazley |
