= Charles Cutler =

Australian politician (1918–2006)

The Honourable Sir Charles Cutler KBE ED

7th Deputy Premier of New South Wales
- In office 13 May 1965 – 16 December 1975
- Premier: Sir Robert Askin; Tom Lewis
- Preceded by: Pat Hills
- Succeeded by: Leon Punch

Member of the New South Wales Parliament for Orange
- In office 3 May 1947 – 16 December 1975
- Preceded by: Bob O'Halloran
- Succeeded by: Garry West

Personal details
- Born: 20 April 1918 Forbes, New South Wales
- Died: 23 September 2006 (aged 88) Orange, New South Wales
- Party: Country Party
- Spouse(s): Dorothy, Lady Cutler
- Relations: Sir Roden Cutler (cousin)
- Occupation: Politician

Military service
- Allegiance: Australia
- Branch/service: Citizen Military Forces; Second Australian Imperial Force
- Years of service: 1938–1960
- Rank: Lieutenant colonel
- Battles/wars: Second World War
- Awards: Efficiency Decoration

Lieutenant-Colonel Sir Charles Benjamin Cutler, KBE, ED (20 April 1918 – 23 September 2006) was an Australian politician, holding office for 28 years as an elected member of the New South Wales Legislative Assembly for Orange. Cutler was Country Party leader for sixteen years and became Minister for Education and Deputy Premier for ten years under Premiers Robert Askin and Tom Lewis.

== Early life ==
Charles Cutler was born in Forbes, New South Wales, in 1918, the son of George Cutler and Elizabeth Booth Cutler. His cousin, Sir Arthur Roden Cutler, was a Victoria Cross recipient and a long-serving Governor of New South Wales. Charles' ministerial service including as Deputy Premier commenced the year before his cousin's appointment as governor, meaning that Charles was in the cabinet that recommended Roden as governor to the Queen and that later Charles was sworn in as a minister in by his governor cousin. At an early age, Charles moved to the nearby regional city of Orange with his family, where he was educated at Orange Rural School and Orange High School. After completing his schooling he gained employment from 1934 until 1939 as an office worker with the Producers Co-Operative Distributing Society Limited of Orange.

== Military service ==
Cutler joined the Citizen Military Forces (CMF) in 1938 and served in the Second World War. He volunteered for the Second Australian Imperial Force in 1940 and served with the 2/17th Battalion at Tobruk and in Syria. He was wounded at El Alamein.

Following the war, Cutler rose to the rank of lieutenant colonel in the CMF from 1948 to 1960 at which time he transferred to the Reserve Forces. Cutler was awarded the Efficiency Decoration in 1959.

== Personal life ==
Charles Cutler married Dorothy Pascoe on 4 March 1943 in the Holy Trinity Church at Orange; they had one daughter and three sons. Following World War II, Cutler returned to his employment at Producers Co-operative Distributing Society Limited in Orange from 1946 to 1947. During this time, he was also a sportswriter for the Bathurst Times newspaper. He also became the vice-president of the Orange Returned Serviceman's League Club and also president of the Orange Apex Club and district rugby union.

== Political career ==
Charles Cutler joined the Country Party in 1944. He was elected as the Member for the Electoral district of Orange at the New South Wales Legislative Assembly on 3 May 1947. He was re-elected in 1950, 1953, 1956, 1959, 1962, 1965, 1968, 1971 and 1973 – ten times in total. In 1958, he was elected as the Deputy Leader of the Country Party, and in 1959, he became party leader, a position he held for 16 years.

On 13 May 1965, he became Deputy Premier, Minister for Education and Minister for Science under the newly elected Liberal Party Premier Robert Askin, in NSW's first non-Labor government in 24 years. In later years, he also held portfolios as Minister for Local Government, Minister for Highways and Minister for Tourism. For several months in 1968 and 1972, he was Acting Premier and Treasurer in Askin's absence. He remained as Deputy Premier for most of 1975 under Tom Lewis after Askin's retirement that year.

In 1973, Cutler was appointed a Knight Commander of the Order of the British Empire (KBE). In 1974, Sir Charles led New South Wales at the Premier's Conference and Loan Council. On 16 December 1975, Sir Charles retired from the New South Wales Parliament after serving continuously as a member for 28 years, 7 months and 14 days.

== Later life ==
Cutler retired to his home at Orange. He became a member of the Former Members of New South Wales Parliament Association. From 1976 to 1978, he was a director of the Sun Alliance Insurance Group. From 1978 to 1988, he was the chairman of that organisation.

Cutler, who had been suffering from cancer, died at the age of 88 on 23 September 2006 in hospital in Orange.

New South Wales National Party Leader Andrew Stoner said that Sir Charles Cutler's commitment to building stronger rural communities was legendary.

"He was responsible for creating a separate Department of Decentralisation and Development and helping strengthen country communities through the establishment of a Country Industries Assistance Fund."

Former Nationals Leader and Deputy Prime Minister Tim Fischer, who served under Sir Charles Cutler, says his contribution to education and infrastructure in rural areas was underestimated. "He made a giant contribution to the educational resources of the state of New South Wales," Mr Fischer said.

== Honours ==
Cutler was appointed a Knight Commander of the Order of the British Empire (KBE) in the Civil division on 1 January 1973 for service as Deputy Premier of New South Wales.

On 1 January 2001, Cutler was awarded the Centenary Medal for service to Australian society through parliament.

New South Wales Legislative Assembly
Preceded by Bob O'Halloran	Member for Orange; 1947 – 1975	Succeeded by Garry West
Party political offices
Preceded by Doug Dickson	Deputy Leader of the New South Wales Country Party; 1958 – 1959	Succeeded by William Chaffey
Preceded by Davis Hughes	Leader of the New South Wales Country Party; 1959 – 1975	Succeeded by Leon Punch
Political offices
Preceded by Pat Hills	Deputy Premier of New South Wales; 1965 – 1975	Succeeded by Leon Punch
Preceded by Ernest Wetherell	Minister for Education; 1965 – 1972	Succeeded by Sir Eric Willis
New title	Minister for Science; 1965 – 1972	Position abolished
Preceded by Pat Morton	Minister for Highways; 1972 – 1975	Succeeded by Wal Fife
Preceded by Pat Morton	Minister for Local Government; 1972 – 1975	Succeeded by Col Fisher
Preceded by Tom Lewis	Minister for Tourism; 1975	Succeeded by Tim Bruxner
