= Harry Jago =

Australian politician

The Honourable Harry Jago

Minister for Health
- In office 13 May 1965 – 3 December 1973
- Premier: Robert Askin
- Preceded by: Bill Sheahan
- Succeeded by: John Lloyd Waddy

Member of the New South Wales Parliament for Gordon
- In office 3 March 1962 – 19 October 1973
- Preceded by: Stewart Fraser
- Succeeded by: Kevin Harrold

Mayor of Ku-ring-gai
- In office 14 December 1959 – 5 December 1961
- Deputy: Reginald Walker
- Preceded by: Andrew Campbell
- Succeeded by: Reginald Walker

Personal details
- Born: 13 March 1913 Chatswood, New South Wales, Australia
- Died: 17 September 1997 (aged 84) Killara, New South Wales, Australia
- Party: Liberal Party
- Spouse: Valerie Hunter
- Children: 1 daughter
- Education: Newington College
- Occupation: Banking

Military service
- Allegiance: Australia
- Branch/service: Australian Army
- Years of service: 1931 – 1932; 1938 – 1945
- Battles/wars: World War II

Arnold Henry Jago (13 March 1913 – 17 September 1997), was a Liberal member of the New South Wales parliament representing the seat Gordon and a Minister of the Crown.

== Early life ==
Jago was born in the Sydney suburb of Chatswood and educated at Newington College (1927–1928) before moving into a career of banking with the Bank of New South Wales in 1929. He served in the Second Australian Imperial Force from 1939 to 1945 in the Middle East and New Guinea. He married Valerie Hunter in 1943 and had a daughter. He served as an alderman on Ku-ring-gai Council from 1959 to 1965 and was the Mayor of Ku-ring-gai from 1960 to 1961.

== Political career ==
In 1962, Jago was elected the member for Gordon in the New South Wales Legislative Assembly. On the election of the Askin government he became Minister for Health and he held that position until he left parliament. In the lead-up to the 1973 election Jago failed to lodge his nomination for the seat of Gordon before the closure of nominations. As a result, in order to prevent the Labor candidate from winning, most Liberal Party voters supported the Democratic Labor Party candidate Kevin Harrold, who therefore had an unexpected victory.

Jago died in the Sydney suburb of Killara in 1997.

Civic offices
Preceded by Andrew Campbell	Mayor of Ku-ring-gai; 1959 – 1961	Succeeded by Reginald Walker
New South Wales Legislative Assembly
Preceded by Stewart Fraser	Member for Gordon; 1962 – 1973	Succeeded by Kevin Harrold
Political offices
Preceded by Bill Sheahan	Minister for Health; 1965 – 1973	Succeeded by John Waddy
Preceded by Arthur Bridges	Minister for Child Welfare; 1968	Succeeded by Frederick Hewitt
Preceded by Arthur Bridges	Minister for Social Welfare; 1968	Succeeded by Frederick Hewitt
