= Tom Lewis (Australian politician) =

New South Wales Premier

The Honourable Tom Lewis AO
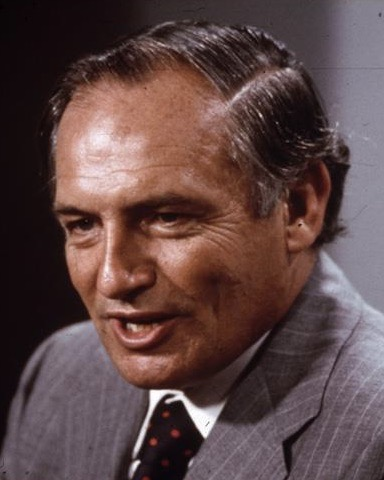
- Lewis in 1975.

33rd Premier of New South Wales
- In office 3 January 1975 – 23 January 1976
- Monarch: Elizabeth II
- Governor: Sir Roden Cutler
- Deputy: Sir Charles Cutler; Leon Punch
- Preceded by: Sir Robert Askin
- Succeeded by: Sir Eric Willis

Member of the New South Wales Parliament for Wollondilly
- In office 26 October 1957 – 7 September 1978
- Preceded by: Blake Pelly
- Succeeded by: Bill Knott

Personal details
- Born: Thomas Lancelot Lewis; 23 January 1922 Adelaide, South Australia
- Died: 25 April 2016 (aged 94)
- Party: Liberal Party
- Spouse(s): Stephanie Spector, Yutta (formerly Anton)
- Relations: Essington Lewis (uncle); Sandy Lewis (brother)
- Parent(s): Lancelot Ashley Lewis and Grace Margaret (Gretta) Lewis nee Laidlaw

Military service
- Allegiance: Australia
- Branch/service: Australian Army
- Years of service: 1941–1946
- Rank: Lieutenant
- Unit: 1st Armoured Division; 2/3rd Commando Squadron
- Battles/wars: World War II; New Guinea campaign; Borneo campaign

Thomas Lancelot Lewis (23 January 1922 – 25 April 2016) was a New South Wales politician who served as the 33rd Premier of New South Wales from 1975 to 1976, and served as a minister in the cabinets of Sir Robert Askin and Sir Eric Willis. He became Premier following Askin's retirement from politics and held the position until he was replaced by Willis in a party vote. Lewis was first elected to the New South Wales Legislative Assembly for the Electoral district of Wollondilly for the Liberal Party in 1957, and served until his resignation in 1978.

== Early life ==
He was born in Adelaide, the son of Lancelot Ashley and Gretta Lewis, and was educated at St Peter's College, Adelaide, from 1931 to 1940. Subsequently, he managed the property of his uncle, Essington Lewis, Managing Director of BHP and Director-General of Munitions during World War II. He was a member of the Australian Imperial Force from 1940 to 1946, and served in Sydney, Celebes, Java and Borneo as a lieutenant. He was on the staff of the Embassy of Australia, Washington, D.C. from 1946 to 1951.

== Early career ==
Lewis was elected as the member for Wollondilly representing the Liberal Party in 1957. When the Askin Government came to power in 1965, Lewis was given relatively junior portfolios of Lands and Mines. As lands minister he was responsible for setting up the NSW National Parks & Wildlife Service in 1967. In 1970, he set up the Foundation for National Parks & Wildlife as an independent not-for-profit organisation, in order to be the fundraising arm of the NSW National Parks & Wildlife Service. In 1972, Tourism was added to his ministerial responsibilities when Eric Willis moved to Education.

== Premier ==
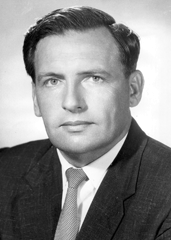
Lewis in 1965, at the start of his ministerial career under Askin.

Askin announced his resignation late in 1974, and Lewis was chosen as leader over Willis and Justice Minister John Maddison. He was sworn in on as Premier on 3 January 1975. He was elected during an uneasy time for the Liberal government, being engaged in almost daily warfare with the Whitlam Labor Government in Canberra, most notably over the Medibank health care scheme, to which New South Wales was the last state to sign.

The defining moment of the Lewis government was the decision taken by Lewis to break with convention when Whitlam appointed his Attorney-General, Lionel Murphy, a Senator from New South Wales, to the High Court of Australia. In a break with long-standing convention, Lewis refused to appoint a replacement Senator from the same party, instead appointing the 72-year-old Mayor of Albury, Cleaver Bunton. This triggered immediate outrage, not only from the Labor Party but also the executive of the Liberal party.

By the end of 1975, Lewis' image was badly damaged and he soon lost the confidence of his party. Sentiment was growing in favour of replacing him with Sir Eric Willis. At a caucus meeting on 20 January 1976, parliamentary backbencher Neil Pickard called a spill motion, which was carried 22 votes to 11. Lewis opted not to try to regain his post, leaving Willis to take the leadership unopposed. Lewis's term as Premier came to an end on 23 January 1976, his 54th birthday. Lewis was the only non-elected non-Labor premier who did not take the Coalition into an election.

== Later life ==
Lewis served as Willis' Minister for Local Government until May 1976, when the Liberal Government was narrowly defeated by the Labor Party. In opposition Lewis did not hold any position within the Shadow Cabinet and later resigned from Parliament on 7 September 1978, the vacancy becoming one of the justifications for calling the election for 7 October 1978. At the election, his seat fell to the Labor candidate Bill Knott. On his departure from parliament, he was permitted by Queen Elizabeth II, on the Governor's recommendation, to continue to use the title "The Honourable".

He was made an Officer of the Order of Australia on 26 January 2000 "For service to the Parliament of New South Wales, to the environment as the founder of the NSW National Parks & Wildlife Service, and to the community". On 1 January 2001 he was awarded the Centenary Medal.

Apart from these two honours, Lewis had kept himself out of the public spotlight since his retirement from Parliament.

Lewis died on 25 April 2016, aged 94.

New South Wales Legislative Assembly
Preceded by Blake Pelly	Member for Wollondilly; 1957–1978	Succeeded by Bill Knott
Political offices
Preceded by Keith Compton	Minister for Lands; 1965–1975	Succeeded by Milton Morris
Preceded by Jim Simpson	Minister for Mines; 1965–1967	Succeeded by Wal Fife
Preceded by Eric Willis as Minister for Tourism and Sport	Minister for Tourism; 1972–1975	Succeeded by Sir Charles Cutler
Preceded by Sir Robert Askin	Premier of New South Wales; 1975–1976	Succeeded by Sir Eric Willis
Preceded by Sir Robert Askin	Treasurer of New South Wales; 1975–1976	Succeeded by Sir Eric Willis
Preceded by Col Fisher	Minister for Local Government; 1976	Succeeded by Harry Jensen
Party political offices
Preceded by Sir Robert Askin	Leader of the New South Wales Liberal Party; 1975–1976	Succeeded by Sir Eric Willis
