= Electoral results for the district of Fairfield =

Election results for Fairfield, New South Wales, Australia

Fairfield, an electoral district of the Legislative Assembly in the Australian state of New South Wales, has existed from 1953 to the present.

== Members for Fairfield ==
Election	Member	Party
1953	Clarrie Earl	Labor
1956	Clarrie Earl	Labor
1959	Clarrie Earl	Labor
1962	Jack Ferguson	Labor
1965	Jack Ferguson	Labor
1968	Eric Bedford	Labor
1971	Eric Bedford	Labor
1973	Eric Bedford	Labor
1976	Eric Bedford	Labor
1978	Eric Bedford	Labor
1981	Janice Crosio	Labor
1984	Janice Crosio	Labor
1988	Geoff Irwin	Labor
1991	Geoff Irwin	Labor
1995	Joe Tripodi	Labor
1999	Joe Tripodi	Labor
2003	Joe Tripodi	Labor
2007	Joe Tripodi	Labor
2011	Guy Zangari	Labor
2015	Guy Zangari	Labor
2019	Guy Zangari	Labor
2023	David Saliba	Labor

== Election results ==
=== Elections in the 2020s ===
==== 2023 ====
2023 New South Wales state election: Fairfield
Party	Candidate	Votes	%	±%
Labor	David Saliba	24,340	51.1	−5.8
Liberal	Aaryen Pillai	9,675	20.3	−6.6
Independent	Hikmat Odesh	4,891	10.3	+10.3
Independent	Severino Lovero	3,219	6.8	+6.8
Greens	Monika Ball	2,615	5.5	−1.7
Legalise Cannabis	Jacob Potkonyak	1,841	3.9	+3.9
Public Education	Robyn Leggatt	1,017	2.1	+2.1
Total formal votes		47,598	92.9	−1.2
Informal votes		3,625	7.1	+1.2
Turnout		51,223	85.2	−2.5
Two-party-preferred result
Labor	David Saliba	27,792	70.9	+4.0
Liberal	Aaryen Pillai	11,414	29.1	−4.0
Labor hold		Swing	+4.0	

=== Elections in the 2010s ===
==== 2019 ====
2019 New South Wales state election: Fairfield
Party	Candidate	Votes	%	±%
Labor	Guy Zangari	25,225	57.23	+3.53
Liberal	Sabah (Sam) Youkhana	11,231	25.48	+1.36
Christian Democrats	Sam Georgis	4,257	9.66	−0.14
Greens	Astrid O'Neill	3,362	7.63	+2.39
Total formal votes		44,075	94.19	−0.38
Informal votes		2,719	5.81	+0.38
Turnout		46,794	87.18	−1.93
Two-party-preferred result
Labor	Guy Zangari	26,848	67.93	+0.14
Liberal	Sabah (Sam) Youkhana	12,675	32.07	−0.14
Labor hold		Swing	+0.14	

==== 2015 ====
2015 New South Wales state election: Fairfield
Party	Candidate	Votes	%	±%
Labor	Guy Zangari	24,670	53.7	+10.8
Liberal	Charbel Saliba	11,079	24.1	−14.8
Christian Democrats	Edward Royal	4,500	9.8	+4.6
No Land Tax	James Lazar	3,281	7.1	+7.1
Greens	Andrew Nicholson	2,406	5.2	−1.5
Total formal votes		45,936	94.6	+1.3
Informal votes		2,637	5.4	−1.3
Turnout		48,573	89.1	−1.1
Two-party-preferred result
Labor	Guy Zangari	26,667	67.8	+15.5
Liberal	Charbel Saliba	12,669	32.2	−15.5
Labor hold		Swing	+15.5	

==== 2011 ====
2011 New South Wales state election: Fairfield
Party	Candidate	Votes	%	±%
Labor	Guy Zangari	17,858	40.7	−17.6
Liberal	Charbel Saliba	16,657	37.9	+15.3
Greens	Annie Nielsen	2,890	6.6	+0.4
Christian Democrats	Eileen Nasr	2,332	5.3	+0.0
Independent	David Ball	1,489	3.4	+3.4
Social Justice Network	Ahmad Al-Yasiry	1,281	2.9	+2.9
Communist League	Linda Harris	1,074	2.4	+2.4
Socialist Alliance	Daicy Olaya	329	0.7	+0.7
Total formal votes		43,910	93.5	−1.7
Informal votes		3,061	6.5	+1.7
Turnout		46,971	91.6	−0.6
Two-party-preferred result
Labor	Guy Zangari	19,189	51.7	−18.7
Liberal	Charbel Saliba	17,930	48.3	+18.7
Labor hold		Swing	−18.7	

=== Elections in the 2000s ===
==== 2007 ====
2007 New South Wales state election: Fairfield
Party	Candidate	Votes	%	±%
Labor	Joe Tripodi	24,767	58.3	−5.7
Liberal	James Conna	9,628	22.7	+4.1
Greens	Lizza Gebilagin	2,637	6.2	+1.1
Christian Democrats	Alex Sharah	2,253	5.3	+4.2
Unity	John Yuen	2,113	5.0	−1.8
AAFI	John Vanderwel	1,099	2.6	+0.9
Total formal votes		42,497	95.1	−0.4
Informal votes		2,171	4.9	+0.4
Turnout		44,668	92.2	
Two-party-preferred result
Labor	Joe Tripodi	26,382	70.4	−6.0
Liberal	James Conna	11,098	29.6	+6.0
Labor hold		Swing	−6.0	

==== 2003 ====
2003 New South Wales state election: Fairfield
Party	Candidate	Votes	%	±%
Labor	Joe Tripodi	24,534	63.7	+3.6
Liberal	Karam Awad	6,914	17.9	+3.4
Unity	Nguyen Truong	3,305	8.6	−0.2
Greens	Roger Barsony	2,023	5.2	+3.0
One Nation	Nada Taunton-Henderson	891	2.3	−5.2
AAFI	Michael Chehoff	876	2.3	+1.0
Total formal votes		38,543	95.5	+0.1
Informal votes		1,836	4.5	−0.1
Turnout		40,379	91.5	
Two-party-preferred result
Labor	Joe Tripodi	26,157	77.0	−1.3
Liberal	Karam Awad	7,833	23.0	+1.3
Labor hold		Swing	−1.3	

=== Elections in the 1990s ===
==== 1999 ====
1999 New South Wales state election: Fairfield
Party	Candidate	Votes	%	±%
Labor	Joe Tripodi	23,362	60.1	−1.5
Liberal	Andrew Rohan	5,629	14.5	−16.0
Unity	Thang Ngo	3,419	8.8	+8.8
One Nation	Bob Vinnicombe	2,929	7.5	+7.5
Christian Democrats	George Haroon	1,188	3.1	+3.0
Greens	Rodrigo Gutierrez	839	2.2	+2.2
Democrats	David Hua	662	1.7	−3.1
AAFI	John Carey	512	1.3	+1.3
Natural Law	Linda Cogger	133	0.3	−1.6
Independent	Bob Aiken	130	0.3	+0.3
Non-Custodial Parents	Samuel Mackenzie	87	0.2	+0.2
Total formal votes		38,890	95.3	+4.5
Informal votes		1,911	4.7	−4.5
Turnout		40,801	93.0	
Two-party-preferred result
Labor	Joe Tripodi	25,891	78.3	+11.9
Liberal	Andrew Rohan	7,163	21.7	−11.9
Labor hold		Swing	+11.9	

==== 1995 ====
1995 New South Wales state election: Fairfield
Party	Candidate	Votes	%	±%
Labor	Joe Tripodi	19,748	61.4	+6.2
Liberal	Frank Oliveri	9,491	29.5	−3.0
Democrats	Ron Cameron	1,766	5.5	+0.3
Natural Law	Linda Cogger	650	2.0	+2.0
Democratic Socialist	Mike Karadjis	487	1.5	+1.5
Total formal votes		32,142	90.2	+9.3
Informal votes		3,485	9.8	−9.3
Turnout		35,627	93.7	
Two-party-preferred result
Labor	Joe Tripodi	20,815	67.1	+5.7
Liberal	Frank Oliveri	10,218	32.9	−5.7
Labor hold		Swing	+5.7	

==== 1991 ====
1991 New South Wales state election: Fairfield
Party	Candidate	Votes	%	±%
Labor	Geoff Irwin	15,046	55.2	+0.4
Liberal	John Natoli	8,868	32.5	−5.5
Call to Australia	Keith Smith	1,925	7.1	+7.1
Democrats	Chad Zadourian	1,416	5.2	+1.0
Total formal votes		27,255	80.9	−13.4
Informal votes		6,447	19.1	+13.4
Turnout		33,702	92.8	
Two-party-preferred result
Labor	Geoff Irwin	15,773	61.3	+3.0
Liberal	John Natoli	9,947	38.7	−3.0
Labor hold		Swing	+3.0	

=== Elections in the 1980s ===
==== 1988 ====
1988 New South Wales state election: Fairfield
Party	Candidate	Votes	%	±%
Labor	Geoff Irwin	13,840	48.4	−16.7
Liberal	Joe Morizzi	11,492	40.2	+8.6
Democrats	Christine Jarvis	1,940	6.8	+6.8
Independent	Allan Gore	1,344	4.7	+4.7
Total formal votes		28,616	94.4	−1.5
Informal votes		1,711	5.6	+1.5
Turnout		30,327	92.7	
Two-party-preferred result
Labor	Geoff Irwin	14,719	53.9	−13.2
Liberal	Joe Morizzi	12,594	46.1	+13.2
Labor hold		Swing	−13.2	

==== 1984 ====
1984 New South Wales state election: Fairfield
Party	Candidate	Votes	%	±%
Labor	Janice Crosio	20,042	66.4	−13.8
Liberal	Geoffrey Goninon	7,520	24.9	+5.1
Independent	Raymon Wilson	2,602	8.6	+8.6
Total formal votes		30,164	95.7	+1.0
Informal votes		1,365	4.3	−1.0
Turnout		31,529	92.1	+1.9
Two-party-preferred result
Labor	Janice Crosio		71.8	−8.4
Liberal	Geoffrey Goninon		28.2	+8.4
Labor hold		Swing	−8.4	

==== 1981 ====
1981 New South Wales state election: Fairfield
Party	Candidate	Votes	%	±%
Labor	Janice Crosio	21,944	80.2	+4.8
Liberal	Robert Goninon	5,432	19.8	+1.9
Total formal votes		27,376	94.7	
Informal votes		1,532	5.3	
Turnout		28,908	90.2	
Labor hold		Swing	+1.8	

=== Elections in the 1970s ===
==== 1978 ====
1978 New South Wales state election: Fairfield
Party	Candidate	Votes	%	±%
Labor	Eric Bedford	23,294	75.4	+6.2
Liberal	Charles Rogers	5,544	17.9	−12.9
Democrats	Frank Havlan	2,046	6.6	+6.6
Total formal votes		30,884	95.5	−1.1
Informal votes		1,458	4.5	+1.1
Turnout		32,342	92.8	−0.8
Two-party-preferred result
Labor	Eric Bedford	24,215	78.4	+9.3
Liberal	Charles Rogers	6,669	21.6	−9.3
Labor hold		Swing	+9.3	

==== 1976 ====
1976 New South Wales state election: Fairfield
Party	Candidate	Votes	%	±%
Labor	Eric Bedford	20,777	69.2	+5.2
Liberal	Charles Rogers	9,271	30.8	+2.5
Total formal votes		30,048	96.6	+1.6
Informal votes		1,052	3.4	−1.6
Turnout		31,100	93.6	+1.4
Labor hold		Swing	+1.3	

==== 1973 ====
1973 New South Wales state election: Fairfield
Party	Candidate	Votes	%	±%
Labor	Eric Bedford	17,713	64.0	−0.3
Liberal	Domenic Pangallo	7,843	28.3	−3.6
Australia	Robert Tuckwell	1,297	4.7	+4.7
Democratic Labor	Maurice George	840	3.0	+3.0
Total formal votes		27,693	95.0	
Informal votes		1,458	5.0	
Turnout		29,151	92.2	
Two-party-preferred result
Labor	Eric Bedford	18,789	67.8	−1.6
Liberal	Domenic Pangallo	8,904	32.2	+1.6
Labor hold		Swing	−1.6	

==== 1971 ====
1971 New South Wales state election: Fairfield
Party	Candidate	Votes	%	±%
Labor	Eric Bedford	17,172	64.3	+6.8
Liberal	John Woods	8,506	31.9	−10.6
Independent	Edward Oldfield	1,023	3.8	+3.8
Total formal votes		26,701	96.1	
Informal votes		1,091	3.9	
Turnout		27,792	93.7	
Two-party-preferred result
Labor	Eric Bedford	17,684	66.2	+8.7
Liberal	John Woods	9,017	33.8	−8.7
Labor hold		Swing	+8.7	

=== Elections in the 1960s ===
==== 1968 ====
1968 New South Wales state election: Fairfield
Party	Candidate	Votes	%	±%
Labor	Eric Bedford	15,632	57.5	+0.4
Liberal	Frank Calabro	11,561	42.5	+4.5
Total formal votes		27,193	96.5	
Informal votes		982	3.5	
Turnout		28,175	94.9	
Labor hold		Swing	−0.5	

==== 1965 ====
1965 New South Wales state election: Fairfield
Party	Candidate	Votes	%	±%
Labor	Jack Ferguson	15,228	58.1	−5.0
Liberal	Stanislaus Kelly	9,710	37.0	+0.1
Democratic Labor	Andrew Murphy	1,281	4.9	+4.9
Total formal votes		26,219	97.0	−0.9
Informal votes		821	3.0	+0.9
Turnout		27,040	94.9	+0.5
Two-party-preferred result
Labor	Jack Ferguson	15,484	59.1	−4.0
Liberal	Stanislaus Kelly	10,735	40.9	+4.0
Labor hold		Swing	−4.0	

==== 1962 ====
1962 New South Wales state election: Fairfield
Party	Candidate	Votes	%	±%
Labor	Jack Ferguson	14,348	63.1	+2.7
Liberal	Frederick Jackson	8,395	36.9	+0.5
Total formal votes		22,743	97.9	
Informal votes		491	2.1	
Turnout		23,234	94.4	
Labor hold		Swing	+0.3	

=== Elections in the 1950s ===
==== 1959 ====
1959 New South Wales state election: Fairfield
Party	Candidate	Votes	%	±%
Labor	Clarrie Earl	16,877	66.4	
Liberal	David Fairs	7,733	30.4	
Communist	Edwin Lipscombe	800	3.2	
Total formal votes		25,410	97.5	
Informal votes		657	97.5	
Turnout		26,067	94.6	
Two-party-preferred result
Labor	Clarrie Earl	17,517	68.9	
Liberal	David Fairs	7,893	31.1	
Labor hold		Swing		

==== 1956 ====
1956 New South Wales state election: Fairfield
Party	Candidate	Votes	%	±%
Labor	Clarrie Earl	16,258	62.9	−28.4
Liberal	Guy Holmes	8,541	33.0	+33.0
Communist	Edwin Lipscombe	1,057	4.1	−4.6
Total formal votes		25,856	98.3	+8.0
Informal votes		456	1.7	−8.0
Turnout		26,312	93.3	+0.1
Two-party-preferred result
Labor	Clarrie Earl	17,209	66.6	−24.7
Liberal	Guy Holmes	8,647	33.4	+33.4
Labor hold		Swing	N/A	

==== 1953 ====
1953 New South Wales state election: Fairfield
Party	Candidate	Votes	%	±%
Labor	Clarrie Earl	17,322	91.3	
Communist	Edwin Lipscombe	1,642	8.7	
Total formal votes		18,964	90.3	
Informal votes		2,030	9.7	
Turnout		20,994	93.2	
Labor notional hold		Swing	N/A	
