= Electoral results for the district of Merrylands =

Election results for Merrylands, New South Wales, Australia

Merrylands, an electoral district of the Legislative Assembly in the Australian state of New South Wales had two incarnations, from 1959 to 1962 and from 1968 to 1988.

Election	Member	Party
1959	Jack Ferguson	Labor
Election	Member	Party
1968	Jack Ferguson	Labor
1971	Jack Ferguson	Labor
1973	Jack Ferguson	Labor
1976	Jack Ferguson	Labor
1978	Jack Ferguson	Labor
1981	Jack Ferguson	Labor
1984	Geoff Irwin	Labor

== Election results ==
=== Elections in the 1980s ===
==== 1984 ====
1984 New South Wales state election: Merrylands
Party	Candidate	Votes	%	±%
Labor	Geoff Irwin	17,874	63.7	−11.6
Liberal	Garo Gabrielian	8,159	29.1	+4.4
Independent	Alan Byers	2,045	7.3	+7.3
Total formal votes		28,078	96.0	+0.7
Informal votes		1,156	4.0	−0.7
Turnout		29,234	93.9	+1.5
Two-party-preferred result
Labor	Geoff Irwin		67.4	−7.9
Liberal	Garo Gabrielian		32.6	+7.9
Labor hold		Swing	−7.9	

==== 1981 ====
1981 New South Wales state election: Merrylands
Party	Candidate	Votes	%	±%
Labor	Jack Ferguson	20,732	75.3	−1.1
Liberal	Alan Byers	6,794	24.7	+5.4
Total formal votes		27,526	95.3	
Informal votes		1,370	4.7	
Turnout		28,896	92.4	
Labor hold		Swing	−3.3	

=== Elections in the 1970s ===
==== 1978 ====
1978 New South Wales state election: Merrylands
Party	Candidate	Votes	%	±%
Labor	Jack Ferguson	25,469	76.4	+11.3
Liberal	John Melouney	6,426	19.3	−15.6
Democrats	Norma Wade	1,447	4.3	+4.3
Total formal votes		33,342	97.0	−0.5
Informal votes		1,046	3.0	+0.5
Turnout		34,388	93.9	−0.5
Two-party-preferred result
Labor	Jack Ferguson	26,193	78.6	+13.5
Liberal	John Melouney	7,149	21.4	−13.5
Labor hold		Swing	+13.5	

==== 1976 ====
1976 New South Wales state election: Merrylands
Party	Candidate	Votes	%	±%
Labor	Jack Ferguson	21,435	65.1	+7.0
Liberal	Rodney Lewis	11,487	34.9	−1.5
Total formal votes		32,922	97.5	+1.2
Informal votes		854	2.5	−1.2
Turnout		33,776	94.4	+2.1
Labor hold		Swing	+3.2	

==== 1973 ====
1973 New South Wales state election: Merrylands
Party	Candidate	Votes	%	±%
Labor	Jack Ferguson	17,770	58.1	−9.1
Liberal	Garry Dent	11,140	36.4	+3.6
Australia	Geoffrey Thomas	1,682	5.5	+5.5
Total formal votes		30,592	96.3	
Informal votes		1,160	3.7	
Turnout		31,752	92.3	
Two-party-preferred result
Labor	Jack Ferguson	18,947	61.9	−5.3
Liberal	Garry Dent	11,645	38.1	+5.3
Labor hold		Swing	−5.3	

==== 1971 ====
1971 New South Wales state election: Merrylands
Party	Candidate	Votes	%	±%
Labor	Jack Ferguson	19,002	67.2	+3.9
Liberal	Neville Hodsdon	9,259	32.8	−3.9
Total formal votes		28,261	96.8	
Informal votes		940	3.2	
Turnout		29,201	93.6	
Labor hold		Swing	+3.9	

=== Elections in the 1970s ===
==== 1968 ====
1968 New South Wales state election: Merrylands
Party	Candidate	Votes	%	±%
Labor	Jack Ferguson	17,326	63.3	
Liberal	Stanislaus Kelly	10,048	36.7	
Total formal votes		27,374	96.4	
Informal votes		1,031	3.6	
Turnout		28,405	94.1	
Labor win		(new seat)		

District recreated

==== 1962 - 1968 ====
District abolished

=== Elections in the 1950s ===
==== 1959 ====
1959 New South Wales state election: Merrylands
Party	Candidate	Votes	%	±%
Labor	Jack Ferguson	14,785	56.0	
Liberal	Graham Cullis	11,636	44.0	
Total formal votes		26,421	98.0	
Informal votes		546	2.0	
Turnout		26,967	94.7	
Labor notional hold				
