= Fairfield East =

- Suburb
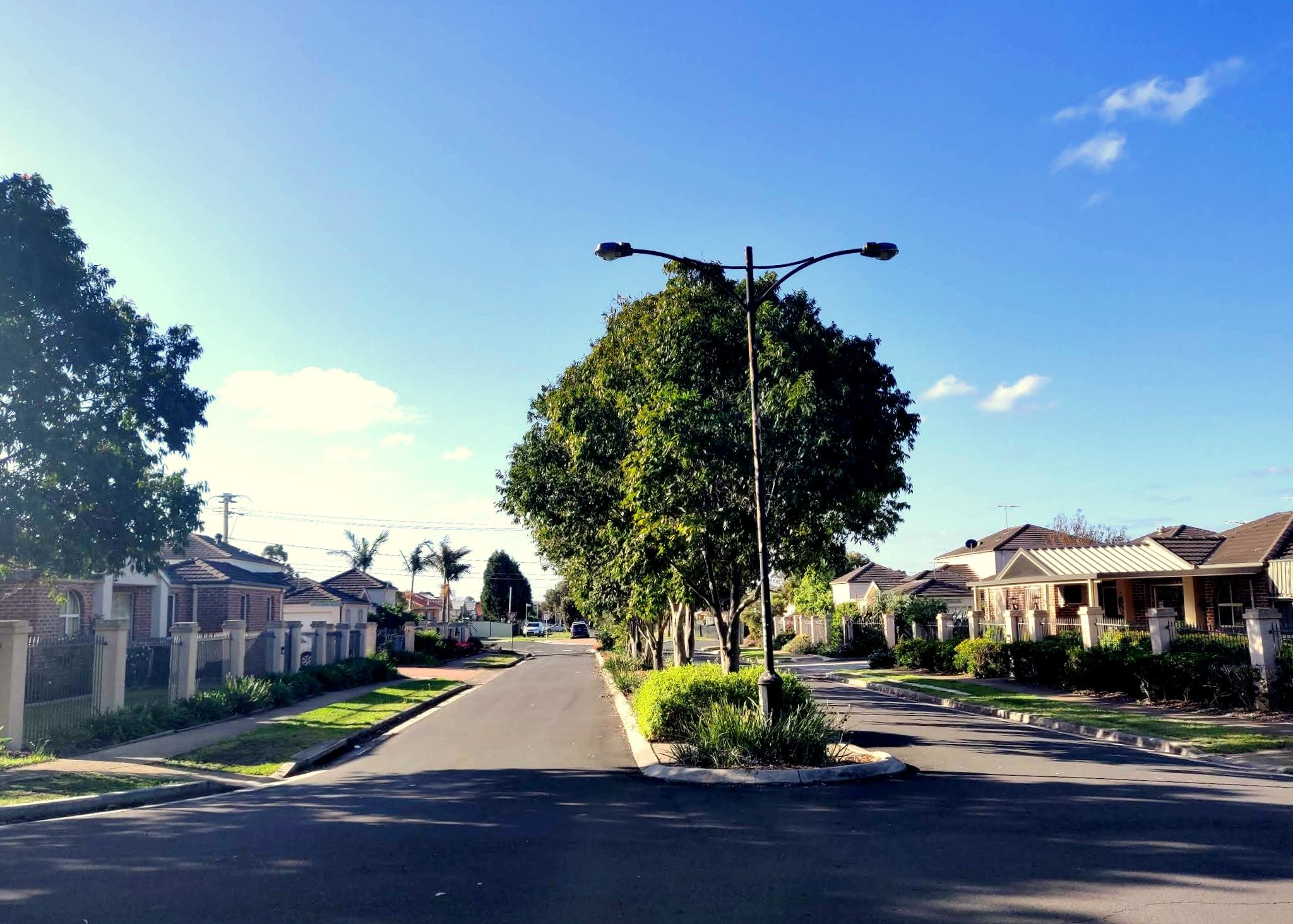
- An avenue of trees in the Hamilton Grove Estate

- Interactive map of Fairfield East
- Country: Australia
- State: New South Wales
- City: Sydney
- LGA: City of Fairfield
- Location: 27 km (17 mi) west of Sydney CBD
- Established: 1876

Government
  - State electorate: Fairfield
  - Federal division: Fowler
- Elevation: 12 m (39 ft)

Population
  - Total: 5,198 (2021 census)
- Postcode: 2165
Suburbs around Fairfield East
Fairfield	Yennora	Old Guildford
Fairfield	Fairfield East	Villawood
Fairfield	Villawood	Villawood

Fairfield East is a suburb of Sydney, in the state of New South Wales, Australia. Fairfield East is located 27 kilometres (17 mi) west of the Sydney central business district in the local government area of the City of Fairfield. Fairfield East is part of the Greater Western Sydney region. Fairfield East shares the postcode of 2165 with nearby suburbs of Fairfield, Fairfield Heights and Fairfield West.

== History ==
Fairfield East gets its name from its neighbour Fairfield which in turn was named after the family estate of Captain John Horsley, an early settler. Prior to colonisation, the Cabrogal clan of the Dharug people inhabited the area around what is now known as Fairfield East. British settlers moved into the area in the early 19th century and used the land for farming.

By the 1870s, the area now known as Fairfield East was part of two large properties: Orchardleigh in the north which extended towards Guildford and Mark Lodge in the south which also included Villawood, Carramar and parts of the Fairfield town centre. In 1876, Orchardleigh was subdivided for housing and when Mark Lodge followed suit in 1885, the area completed its transformation from farmland to suburbia. The name Mark Lodge was still used in the area for some time after although by the 1950s it had officially become Fairfield East. "Mark Lodge", which once included the Fairfield Town Centre, Carramar and Villawood, previously belonged to William Bland.

== Amenities ==
One-fourth of the suburb comprises large industrial area. There a few shopfronts on Tangerine Street. Like most towns, various restaurants and shops are scattered throughout.

The suburb features a Church of God, a Mission church, an Indian Protestant church and a Baptist church.

== Transport ==
The Horsley Drive is one of the main arterial roads that runs through the western boundary of the suburb. Yennora railway station, the most proximate train station to large swathes of Fairfield East, is on the Main Southern railway line. Trains run frequently from Yennora to Leppington, Richmond and the City Circle. Fairfield railway station is more immediate to the northwestern corner of the suburb. Fairfield East is also serviced by bus services operated by Transit Systems.

== Housing ==
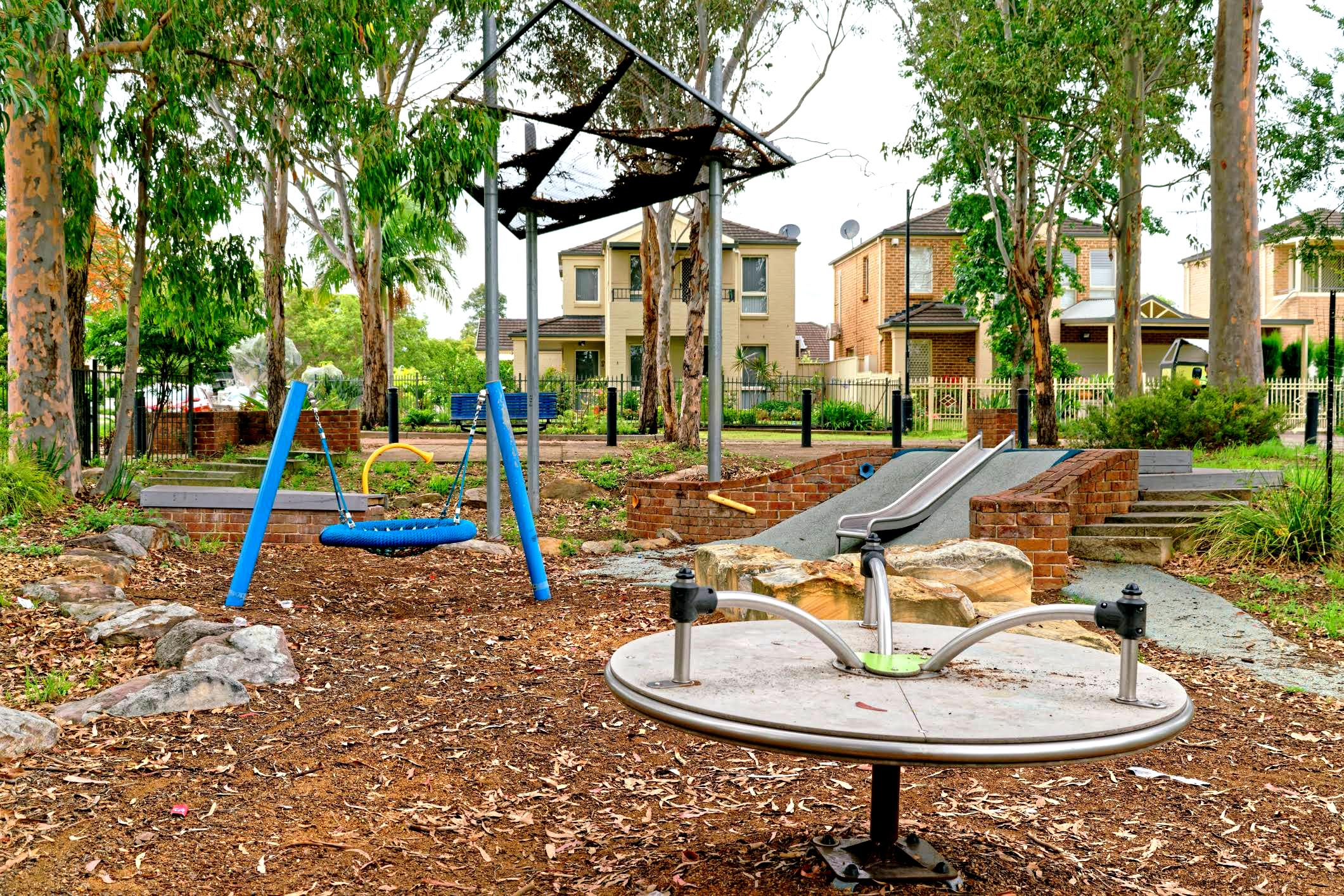
Hamilton Grove Park within the housing estate

Completed in 2003, the Hamilton Grove Estate is a block of residential land situated between Tangerine Street to the north and Mitchel Street to the south that features over 170 modern family homes. Developed by Landcom to reflect the traditional suburban tone of the neighbouring area, the housing estate won the NSW Urban Development Institute of Australia's Award for best Small Scale Residential Development and was a finalist in the National Awards. The area was formerly a public housing estate, before it was demolished due to it being in poor condition. In 2003, the majority of homes purchased at the estate were by first homebuyers. The playground in Hamilton Grove Park was also upgraded.

== Recreational areas ==
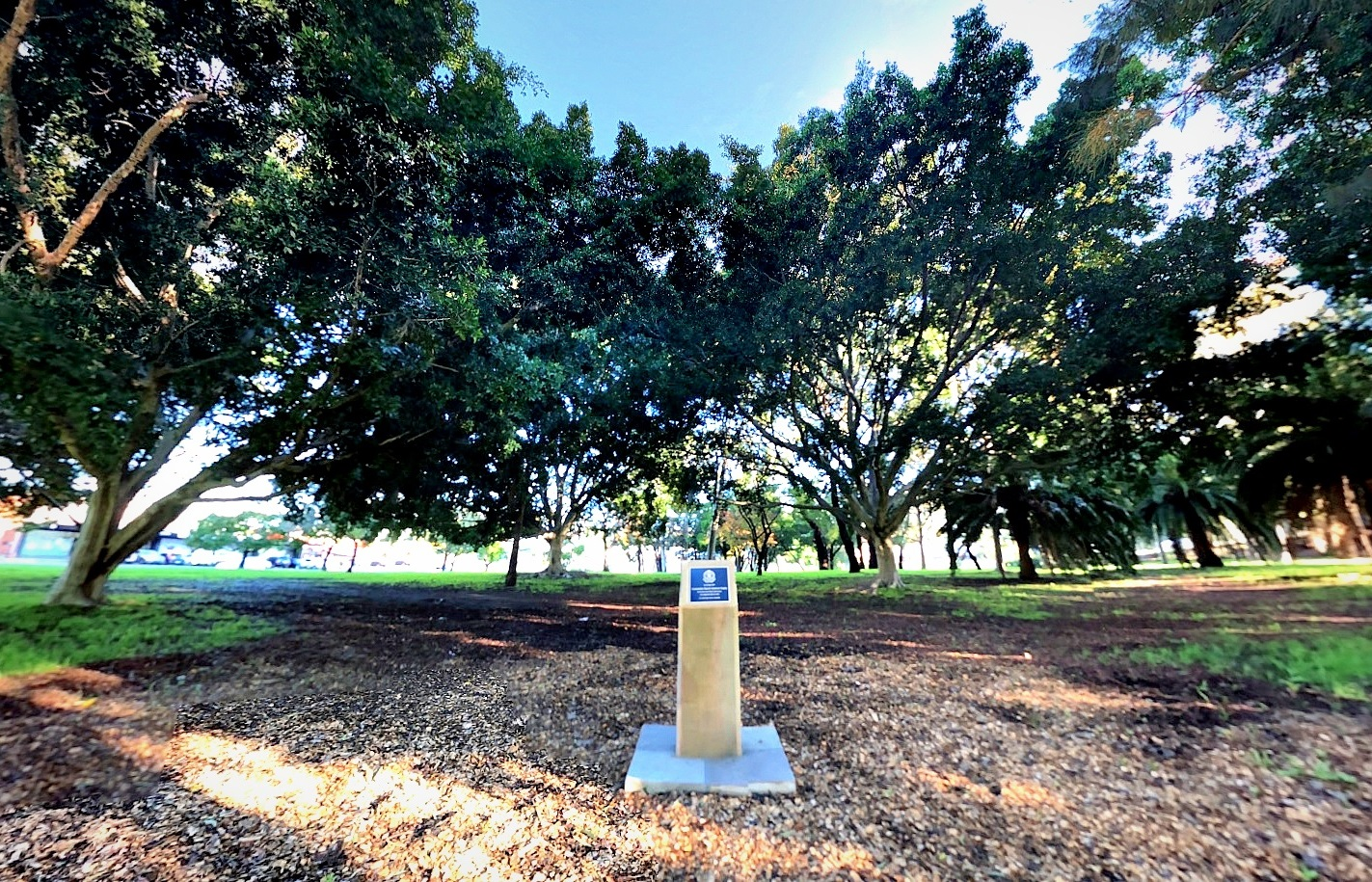
David Carty Reserve

The suburb features small parks, such as Montrose Park and MacArthur Park. The bushy small reserves along the Burns Creek riparian strip such as Landon Street Reserve, Blackford Park and Hanson Reserve feature remnant bushland, as the creek strip was once a gully, although most of the riparian zone is inaccessible for public. Hamilton Grove Park (which contains a children's playground) is the largest park in the suburb by area.

David Carty Reserve, the second largest green space in the suburb, is a grove situated at the corner of Fairfield Street and The Horsley Drive that commemorates police officer David Carty who was stabbed to death on 18 April 1997 by a local gang. The reserve features his memorial commemorative plaque, and is ornamented by several curtain figs, Canary Island palms and camphor trees. Whilst it does not feature pathways internally, the surrounding pedestrian paths provide views of the reserve.

== Demographics ==
According to the 2021 census, Fairfield East had a population of 5,198 people. 39.2% of people were born in Australia. The next most common countries of birth were Vietnam 18.9%, Iraq 7.2%, Lebanon 3.0% and China 2.7%. Top ancestries were Vietnamese 23.8%, Chinese 12.0%, Australian 9.5%, English 8.0% and Lebanese 7.8%. 20.5% of people spoke only English at home. Other languages spoken at home included Vietnamese 24.6%, Arabic 16.4%, Cantonese 4.3%, Mandarin 2.6% and Karen 2.3%.

The most common responses for religion were Catholic 20.3%, Islam 19.7%, Buddhism 19.1%, and No Religion 14.5%. Christianity was the largest religious group reported overall at 38.9%.

The most common occupations included professionals 16.9%, labourers 14.6%, machinery operators and drivers 14.5%, clerical and administrative workers 14.1% and technicians and trades workers 13.1%.
