= Guildford West pipehead and water supply canal =

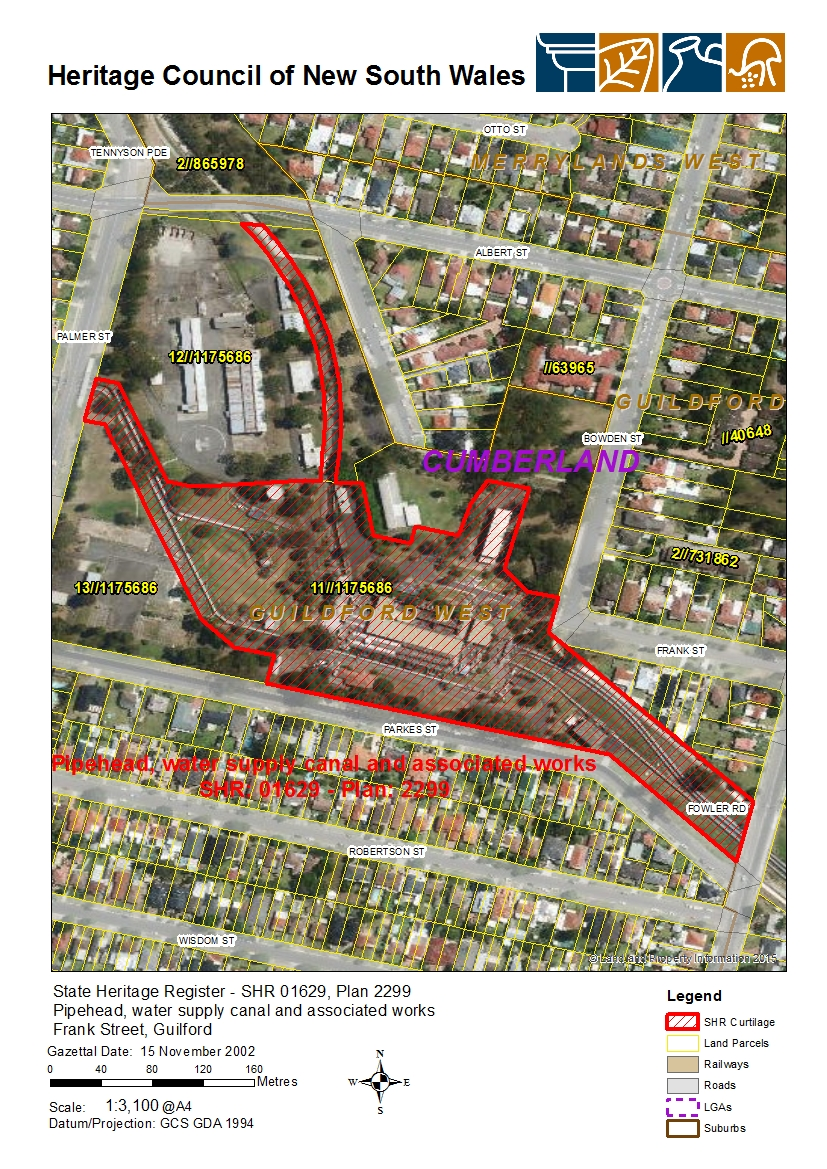
- Heritage boundaries

- Location within Sydney Location within Australia
- 33°50′49″S 150°58′13″E
- Location: Frank Street, Guildford, Cumberland Council, New South Wales, Australia

Site notes
- Owner: Sydney Water

New South Wales Heritage Register
- Official name: Pipehead, water supply canal and associated works; Headworks; Industrial Archaeological Site
- Type: State heritage (built)
- Designated: 15 November 2002
- Part of: Upper Nepean Scheme
- Reference no.: 1629
- Type: Water Supply Canal
- Category: Utilities – Water

The Guildford West pipehead and water supply canal is a heritage-listed sewerage infrastructure and water supply canal located at Frank Street, Guildford, New South Wales, a suburb of Sydney, Australia. It is also known as Headworks; Industrial Archaeological Site. The property is owned by Sydney Water, an agency of the Government of New South Wales. It was added to the New South Wales State Heritage Register on 15 November 2002.

== History ==
=== Colonial history ===
As early as 1817 retired army officer Lieutenant Samuel North was granted 260 hectares (640 acres) south of Parramatta and south of today's suburb of Guildford. He named his property Guildford in honour of the Earl of Guildford. An area of 400 hectares (1,000 acres) west of Woodville Road was reserved by Governor Phillip and then passed to the Church and Schools Corporation. John Thomas Campbell, administrative assistant to Governor Macquarie in 1823 also received a grant of 400 hectares (1,000 acres) of land. Campbell's land which he called "Quid pro Quo", lay west of Woodford Road and south of Rawson Road. William and John Lackey also received grants in the area in 1838. Their property was known as Woodville. Then in 1843 Henry Whitaker purchased North's Guildford property along with several neighbouring properties and called his land Orchardleigh.

The Quid pro Quo estate was subdivided for sale into four blocks in 1832. Additional subdivisions occurred in the 1860s and 1870s with land being purchased by Holroyd and Sherwin. Phillip's reserved area was subdivided in 1871. By 1870, a small settlement had developed with a school at William and John Lackey's Woodville and by 1880 a church had been erected.

In 1876, a railway station opened to the north, west of Woodville Road and at the west end of today's Guildford Road. As a new settlement began to develop around the railway station, the earlier settlement became known as "Old Guildford". Near the railway station the land of Stimson was subdivided in 1876 and 1884 and the new settlement of Guildford emerged. It was not until 1913 that Guildford began to grow into a busy town. A brickworks established in 1915 and the subsequent building industry contributed to its growth. New shops and houses were built for the increasing population. While the building boom lasted into the 1920s, a 1928 aerial photograph shows that much of the surrounding region was still undeveloped.

=== The Upper Nepean Water Supply Scheme ===
A Commission was appointed in 1867 to resolve the problem of water shortages which had been exacerbated by the region's increasing population and periods of drought. The Commission recommended implementation of the Upper Nepean Scheme. After years of debate, this particular scheme was sanctioned by the English civil engineer W. Clark, who had been employed by the government to assess the various options. According to this scheme, water would be directed from the Nepean River and its tributaries (the Avon, Cataract and Cordeaux) through a system of tunnels, canals and aqueducts known as the Upper Canal, down to Prospect Reservoir and from there through the Lower Canal to the Pipehead Basin. The Pipehead Basin was the junction at which the Lower Canal joined the 180-centimetre (72 in) pipeline that would convey water to the screening facility at Potts Hill Reservoir and from there to the Crown Street Reservoir and reservoirs at Woollahra, Paddington and Waverley.

=== Pipehead's construction ===
The NSW Public Works Department began contracting work on construction of the Upper Nepean Scheme in 1880. The following year the government purchased the narrow strip of land for the Pipehead Site from the area's major estates, land probably used for grazing and timber. According to technical documents from 1884, the Pipehead Basin was to be a "simple reservoir built of brick with a mass concrete floor, on a roughly square plan with rounded corners". It would have a strainer which spanned its width supported by the reservoir walls and 5 pylons and included a wrought iron grating to prevent course matter from reaching the water supply mains.

In 1888 the first water supply main from Pipehead to the Potts Hill Site became operational. This 72" pipe, known as Main No. 1, was constructed of "wrought iron riveted pipes, connected with steel collars with lead joints". In the same year the Pipehead Site was fenced and work commenced on the Pipehead Basin (which was completed in 1893). According to a c.1888 plan, the Pipehead Site consisted of the Basin, the canal and pipework and the perimeter fence with its 3 gates. There were no buildings on the plan: no residences, offices or other structures.

Increasing demands on the water supply and efforts to upgrade sections of the mains in other areas led to the establishment of a second water supply main from Pipehead to Potts Hill. Main No.2 was constructed from 'mild steel pipes with angle iron flanged joints, and coated internally with asphaltum. It became operational in 1900. A water main for direct supply to Ryde was completed in 1909. For the first time, this allowed water to bypass the Potts Hill screening chamber. It would be screened instead in a single chamber that had been added to the Pipehead Basin in c.1903–05. A Venturi Meter was added to the Ryde main in c.1906 and a small valve house was constructed above it.

From 1902 to 1912 the Lower Canal was relined and the level of water was raised by 1.5m, increasing the canal's capacity by approximately 75%. The Potts Hill screening chamber found difficulty coping with the increased supply of water and it became a "major hold up point in the water supply network". In order to resolve this problem a new screening facility was built at the Pipehead Site – with 3 Pipehead Basins completed in 1913, 1918 and 1928–29. The Potts Hill screening station was then dismantled. Cranes were introduced to operate the screening at Pipehead. These included the earliest crane (a transversing jib crane with an oil motor) possibly dating to 1909, a new travelling crane which was in operation by 1915 and a locomotive crane which was installed in 1916. After electricity powered the site in 1917 these cranes were converted to electric power and by 1922 there were 4 cranes in operation on the site.

A third water supply main from Pipehead to Potts Hill, Main No. 3, was completed in 1925. It was constructed from electrically welded steel pipes with collars and "full-run" lead joints. However the Pipehead to Potts Hill mains were considered so silted that, in 1926, they had to be relined. Supply was again being amplified to meet consumer demand and a new temporary woodstave main was proposed. The preference for woodstave over steel was intended to avoid the delays anticipated by the need to obtain pipes. This new main was completed by the end of 1927. With supply still being amplified in 1929 the Chief Engineer proposed construction of a 72" water supply main between the Upper Canal and Pipehead. Work began on the new main in 1931 but the Depression interrupted the project. Work resumed in 1933 under a special unemployment relief programme and the main was completed by 1937. The temporary woodstave main ceased to operate in 1938 and was gradually dismantled and/or filled with sand from 1939 to 1941.

=== Expansion of the site ===
A parcel of land (4 acres, 2 rods and 31.75 perches) between the Pipehead Site and Parkes & Palmer Streets was purchased in 1906 as an addition to the site. There was a cottage on this land, situated about 150 metres (490 ft) west-northwest of the Basin. At the same time the section of Sydney Street which divided this land from the Pipehead Site was also acquired.

Around 1910 a detailed survey was undertaken of the Pipehead Site. This showed the site had two cottages. The first was originally built for the caretaker probably c. 1880s as a "typical unpretentious working class residence" with four rooms, timber cladding and a bull-nosed verandah. By 1910, there were plans to convert this into an office. The second cottage was purchased in 1906 with the Sydney Street property. This had been built as a private residence with brick foundations, pine weatherboard cladding, corrugated galvanised iron, brick fireplaces and a four panelled pine entrance door. This was evident in aerial photographs of 1928, 1951 and 1961. It was removed some time in the 1960s and the area on which it stood was cleared by bulldozers to make way for a stores and workshop area.

The detailed survey plan of 1910 also indicated the footprint of a third cottage or "new residence" (facing Parkes Street to the south of the Basin). The plan also showed the site held a 'machine shop, carpenter's store, general workshop/store' (built 1905). There was a "boosting plant" with a second boosting plant in the planning. An elevated tank of 0.45 megalitres (100,000 imp gal) was proposed for construction, to be used in conjunction with the two boosting plants. This tank was installed in 1913.

Work began on the new or third cottage in 1911 and was completed by 1913. Documents for this show a "spacious house plan, characteristic for upper middle class residences in outer suburbs of the time". The plan featured three bedrooms, an office, large board and dining room, sitting room, two verandahs and an amenities wing.

A 1915 survey plan of the Pipehead Site showed the 0.45-megalitre (100,000 imp gal) elevated tank and original cottage (situated to the north of the screening basin) had, by this time, been demolished. Sydney Water's 2005 conservation management plan suggests that the original cottage footprint is "still identifiable in its original location".

The Pipehead Site was again expanded in 1928–29 with acquisition of four land allotments (c. 3.0 hectares (7.5 acres)) between Albert, Bowden and Frank Streets. This had previously been owned by orchardists Daniel and Edwin Wakeley. At the same time, part of Frank Street which separated these two purchases from the original Pipehead Site was also acquired and still more land was purchased in 1949.

The Carpenter's Store in the 1910 survey plan and 1928 aerial photograph was no longer shown in a 1951 aerial photograph. Sherwood Pumping House in the 1928 aerial photo had been removed by 1951 and replaced with new structures which housed Boosting Plants. The 1951 aerial photo shows addition of several auxiliary structures near the 1906 cottage and a large new building with a hipped roof east of the Canal.

In the 1950s there were 2 new structures built: a large rectangular building in the north-west portion of the site (between the Canal and Palmer Street) and a smaller rectangular building adjacent the Boosting Plants. Also a new 84" steel pipeline was completed from Prospect to Pipehead in 1958. Aerial photographs show a number of changes made to the site between 1961 and 1970. The boosting stations north of the Basin were removed as was the 1905 workshop building. This was replaced by a Water Pumping Booster c. 1967. The second cottage (bought in 1906) and large rectangular 1950s building were demolished and the northwest portion of the site completely cleared. New buildings in this area included the Old Store Building, Storage Shed, Asset Management Workshop and Storage Building. The pre-1950s building with the hipped roof to the east of the Canal was replaced with the present Main Building and Conference Room 3 in c. 1967. A residence was built for the Resident Site Operator and so were a Pipeline Control Room, Geological Office and Laboratory and several smaller structures.

In the years 1970–78 a Geological Sample Storage Shed and Water Pumping Station No. 189 were built and two of the main screen basins were replaced by a set of 4 rotary drum screens. Supply from Pipehead to Potts Hill was enhanced by the construction of an additional supply tunnel in 1972. A second Geological Sample Storage Shed and "Hellodrome" were built between 1978–86 and No. 1 and No. 2 screening decks were enclosed by a steel shed in 1981.

In 1991, the Board decided to move screening operations from Pipehead to Prospect and in 1995 staff were relocated and the screening area was decommissioned. After the screening decks officially closed in July 1995 the site was used only for administrative offices.

In 2005, water was still piped from Prospect to Pipehead and from Pipehead to Ryde, Potts Hill and Holroyd. Sydney Water Corporation's 2005 conservation management plan says the elements to and from the Pipehead Site and the Screening Chambers completed in 1929 "are generally in their configuration as at the time of construction". The now empty Lower Canal is also largely unaltered. Other historic elements such as the woodstave main, boosting and pumping stations and the pre-1913 screening facilities are no longer identifiable in the landscape.

Pipehead has been the operational "headworks" since 1888 for the Upper Nepean Scheme, Sydney's first reliable water supply. The scheme was the first of its kind in NSW, harvesting water in the Southern Highlands and transporting it via canals, aqueducts and pipelines. The storage was initially only at Prospect, but later major storages were added at Cataract, Cordeaux, Avon and Nepean.

The Pipe Head to Potts Hill Water Supply consists of three pipelines built between 1888 and 1925. In particular, Pipeline No.1 commissioned in 1888 was the first link between Pipehead (at Guildford) and the Potts Hill No. 1 Reservoir, the scheme's major service reservoir. The pipelines display state-of-the-art technology of the time in Australia. Also, the pipelines illustrate the advancements in major pipeline construction over a span of some 37 years. Four stages of land purchases to the current site started with an initial resumption in 1881, purchase in 1906, gradual purchases in 1928–29 and a further resumption in 1949. Now the pipelines have not become obsolete, but by virtue of boosters, are still key components of Sydney's water supply system. It was the changeover from open canal to No. 1 pipeline that gave Pipehead its name. The site is now arguably the most important operations and control centre for Sydney's water supply system.

== Description ==
The pipehead forms part of the Upper Nepean Scheme.

The following significant items are listed in the Upper Nepean Scheme Heritage Study, 1992 and are the only items on the site considered to be included in this listing:

1. Pipe Head Deck (Basin and Screening Chambers), Screening Chamber
2. Screening Chamber No.2, Screening Chamber
3. Travelling Jib Cranes, Cranes
4. 72 inch mains, Pipe Head to Potts Hill, Mains Pipe
5. Former Residence, now Environment Team office, Residence
6. Former Ryde Valve House, Valve House
7. Supervisory Control Centre, Headworks, Control Room (now refurbished as an Incident Management Centre and not of heritage significance).

Lower Canal

The following significant items are listed in the Upper Nepean Scheme Heritage Study, 1992. 51, Canal Overbridge, Canal Overbridge, 18.

Additional heritage items include

WPS 22. Guildford, (pumping to Holroyd Reservoir). WPS 42. Pipe Head. WPS 189. Pipe Head – Ryde.

Pipehead

The Pipehead Complex is situated off Frank Street, Guildford, at the termination of the Lower Canal from Prospect Reservoir, at 75.24 kilometres (46.75 mi) from the commencement of the Upper Nepean Scheme. The Pipehead Complex is the Headquarters for the Water Board's former Headworks organisation for the supply of bulk water to Sydney and includes a wide range of buildings and ancillary structures to facilitate this purpose. These include steel sheds for equipment storage and maintenance, the Holroyd Pumping Station, outlets for the Ryde Pumping Station suction mains and Booster Station, a booster station for supply to Potts Hill, other ancillary plant, recent offices and administration buildings, and the former main supervisory control centre for the "Headworks" water supply system. A former residence is now in use as the Catchment Control and Management Office.

The complex also retains several items, which specifically relate to the supply of water to Sydney under the original Upper Nepean Scheme. Most notable amongst these is the Pipe Head Deck, comprising the basin and screening chambers, located at the end of the Lower Canal. Although two of the screening chambers (the two on the north, Nos. 1 and 3) have been modified, the No. 2 chamber on the south side was "retained for emergency stand-by" and remains essentially in its original configuration with timber-framed plate screens, which are lifted by two travelling jib-cranes. On the east side of the Pipe Head Deck is the commencement of the three 1,800-millimetre (72 in) mains, which convey water from Pipe Head to Potts Hill. Pipe Head initially only formed the junction (basin) between the open canal or Lower Canal and the original 1,800-millimetre (72 in) pipeline, with screening being carried out at Potts Hill. The first screening chamber at Pipe Head was completed in 1913.

On the west side of the Lower Canal, just before it enters the basin is a concrete lined inlet, entering at an oblique angle. This was formerly the inlet for the 1,100-millimetre (44 in) woodstave pipeline, constructed in 1927 to amplify the supply between the Upper Canal, Pipe Head and Potts Hill. (This was part of the 1,400-to-1,200-millimetre (54 to 46 in) line from Prospect to Potts Hill with a 1,100-millimetre (44 in) offtake to Pipe Head). A section of this woodstave pipe and an associated butterfly valve were displayed at the Pipe Head Complex for many years, but have now been relocated to Prospect Reservoir. There is also a steel "trash rack" and stop-board grooves across the Canal at the entry to the Pipe Head Basin, which are typical of the remnant evidence throughout the Upper Nepean Scheme of past uses and operational terchnology.

The Upper 1,800-millimetre (72 in) main from the Upper Canal, constructed in 1937, passes to the south of the Pipe Head Deck and has a cross-connection to the No. 3, 1,800-millimetre (72 in) main to Potts Hill, just east of the Pipe Head Deck. Near the north-east corner of the Deck stands the picturesque, former Ryde Valve House constructed in 1917. A "Venturi" flow meter from this valve house is on display inside the main administration building.

Other major water supply structures at Pipe Head include the 2,100-millimetre (84 in) pipeline from Prospect Reservoir, constructed between 1954 and 1958. This formerly entered the Deck, but now passes under the Lower Canal to join the 3,000-millimetre (120 in) main to Potts Hill, which runs in a tunnel, completed in 1972. Additional structures include various (recent) valve installations, sub-stations etc.

== Heritage listing ==
As at 8 December 2005, Pipehead is an integral part of the Upper Nepean Scheme and for many years acted as the operational "Headworks" for the Upper Nepean Scheme as a whole.

The significance attached to these pipelines stems from their association as an integral element with the Upper Nepean Scheme, Sydney's first reliable water supply. The scheme was the first of its kind in NSW. It involved the harvesting of water in the Southern Highlands and major transportation to Sydney via canals, aqueducts and pipelines. The storage was initially only at Prospect Reservoir, but years later major storages were added at Cataract, Cordeaux, Avon and Nepean. There had been a similar scheme in Yan Yean outside Melbourne in 1856, as well as others at Bendigo and Ballarat.

The scheme was the first of its kind in Australia and involved the harvesting of water in the southern highlands, storage thereof and then major transport to Sydney via canals, aqueducts and pipelines. The Pipe Head to Potts Hill Water Supply consists of three pipelines built between 1888 and 1925. In particular, Pipeline No.1 commissioned in 1888 is especially significant, as this was the first link between Pipehead (at Guildford) and the Potts Hill No.1 Reservoir, the scheme's major service reservoir for the gravitational supply of Sydney's water. Now, over 100 years since the Upper Nepean Scheme was commissioned, the pipelines have not become obsolete, but by virtue of boosters, are still key components of Sydney's water supply system.

In addition, the pipelines display superb late 19th century hydraulic construction techniques which were state-of-the-art technology of the time in Australia. Also, the three pipelines laid side by side illustrate the advancements in major pipeline construction over a span of some 37 years. Pipeline No.1 (1888) was constructed from wrought iron, Pipeline No. 2 (1900) from mild steel and Pipeline No.3 (1925) from electrically welded steel plates.

Finally, it was the changeover from open canal to No. 1 pipeline that gave Pipehead its name, further adding to the significance of the pipelines. The site is now arguably the most important operations and control centre for Sydney's water supply system.

The pipes are a visual feature of the landscape along which they run. The physical curtilage of the Pipehead to Potts Hill Pipelines extends to the boundary of Sydney Water Corporation land along the route of the pipelines. The curtilage includes the pipelines and all infrastructure associated with the pipelines such as valve houses, flow metres, cross-connections and pumping stations (s.170 register, 1990).

The development of this water supply scheme from the late 19th century to the end of the 20th is evident in the intact fabric, layout and views to the Pipehead Site. The site is a rare industrial landscape containing physical evidence of former and changing work practices - especially the practices involved in water screening, boosting and pumping. The site is unique in both type and scale of operation, with regards to Sydney in particular and New South Wales in general. Many surviving items, such as the screening deck, are notable for their rarity, technological qualities and construction (Steginger & Associates (B), 2008, 25).

Pipehead, water supply canal and associated works was listed on the New South Wales State Heritage Register on 15 November 2002.

== See also ==
- Lower Prospect Canal Reserve
- Upper Nepean Scheme
