= Fairfield Heights =

- Suburb
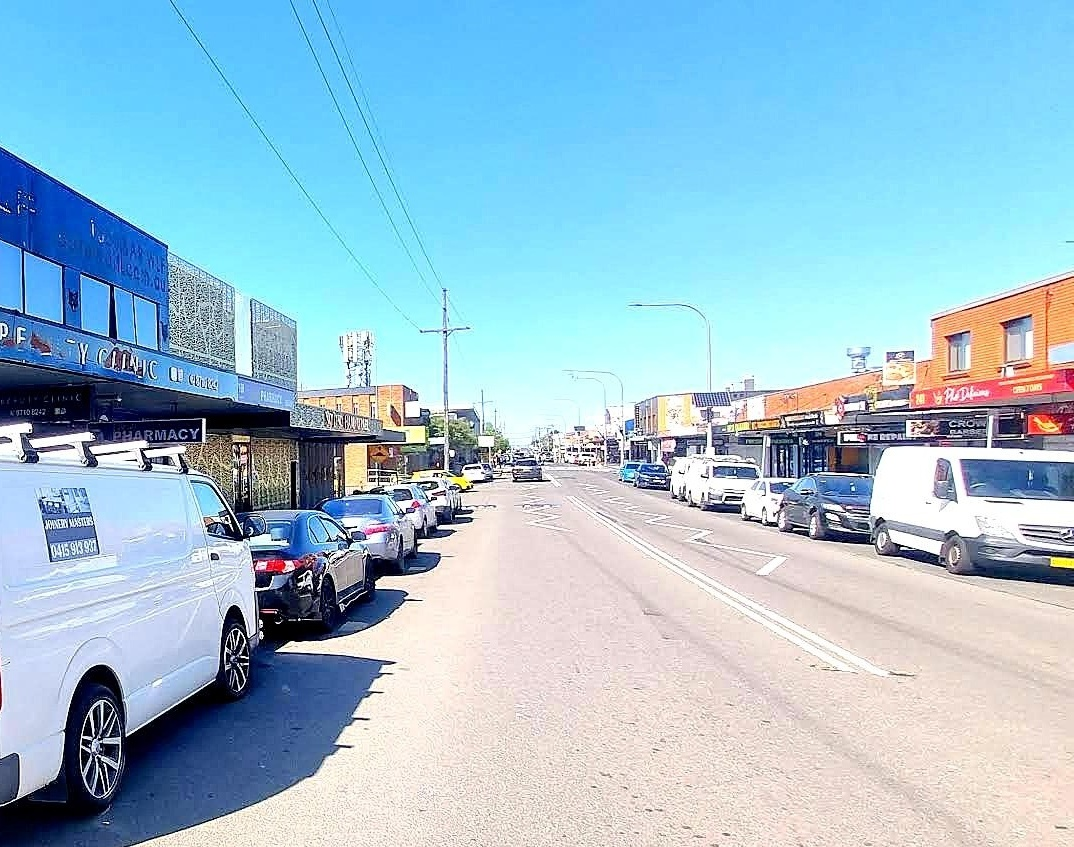
- The suburb's main street, The Boulevard

- Interactive map of Fairfield Heights
- Country: Australia
- State: New South Wales
- City: Sydney
- LGA: City of Fairfield
- Location: 32 km (20 mi) W of Sydney CBD

Government
  - State electorate: Fairfield
  - Federal division: McMahon
- Elevation: 36 m (118 ft)

Population
  - Total: 8,269 (2021 census)
- Postcode: 2165
Suburbs around Fairfield Heights
Smithfield	Smithfield	Fairfield
Fairfield West	Fairfield Heights	Fairfield
Fairfield West	Canley Vale	Fairfield

Fairfield Heights is a suburb of Sydney, in the state of New South Wales, Australia. Fairfield Heights is located 25 kilometres west of the Sydney central business district in the local government area of the City of Fairfield. Fairfield Heights is part of the Greater Western Sydney region. Fairfield Heights shares the postcode of 2165 with the separate suburbs of Fairfield, Fairfield East and Fairfield West. It has the colloquial nickname in the area of "The Heights". The suburb's town centre is bordered by low- and medium-density residential areas, with a primary school nearby.

The town centre has seen economic decline in recent years, reflected in vacant shops and the loss of long-standing businesses, including bank branches. Despite this, the centre is also showing signs of renewal, with new investment such as the Woolworths supermarket, emerging business types like a higher-end café. Medical services are a major strength of the suburb. The majority of residents speak a language other than English at home, with the most common one being Assyrian Neo-Aramaic. Fairfield Heights, like Fairfield, is also an ethnic enclave of Assyrians. There are also high levels of Iraqi, Chinese and Vietnamese ancestry.

== History ==
Aboriginal people from the Cabrogal tribe, a sub-group of the Gandangara tribe, have lived in the Fairfield area for over 30,000 years. White settlement came to the area in the early 19th century. An application for a post office at Fairfield Heights was made by Mrs Beard in 1950.

In 1955, when the population had increased sufficiently a post office was opened. Before 1991, the suburb was part of Fairfield, when it was then established as a separate suburb. In 2009, the Metropolitan Strategy classified Fairfield Heights as a small village, though the Council had sought to reclassify it simply as a village. Also in 2009, Fairfield Heights had around 1,300 dwellings, below the village target of 2,100–5,500 dwellings within a 600 m radius.

== Geography ==
Fairfield Heights is situated in the north-east of the Fairfield LGA, half-way between the Cumberland Highway and Fairfield City Centre. The suburb follows a grid-style subdivision layout, with The Boulevarde serving as the main north–south spine. The Fairfield Heights centre comprises a mix of small and large lots, with generally larger and more fragmented lots on the east side of The Boulevarde. Existing land uses include low-scale mixed-use developments featuring ground-level retail, first-floor commercial space, and limited shop-top housing. The suburb mostly consists of low and medium density residential housing and commercial development. The elevation of this suburb is approximately between 20 and 40 metres (66 and 131 ft) above mean sea level, owing to its name. Station Street and Polding Street have the greatest recorded street-tree canopy cover in Fairfield Heights, at approximately 2,734 m² and 2,172 m², respectively.

Located on the Cumberland Plain, Fairfield Heights’ topography is characterised by a high point near the intersection of Polding Street and The Boulevarde, and a low point around Stanbrook Street and Karabar Street, with a gentle rise towards the south. This terrain provides elevated views looking south along The Boulevarde. Because the street follows a ridgeline, side streets to the west offer elevated glimpses over the surrounding residential areas, with further outlooks possible from upper levels of development along The Boulevarde. Although some tree planting exists in the side streets, the only notable trees are located at the turnaround on Brook Lane (off Stanbrook Street) and behind the Brown Jug Hotel site. Additional trees have been planted near the Woolworths supermarket. Fairfield Heights is predominantly free of natural hindrances, with no flooding (due to its sloped elevation) or acid sulfate soil issues.

== Transport ==
Fairfield Heights is accessible to the broader road network through Smithfield Road (A28) and the M4 Motorway. While the suburb is located away from major arterial roads, it is crossed by Polding Street, which may serve as an improved east–west public transport link between Prairiewood and the Fairfield City Centre. Properties on the western side are accessed via a rear laneway and typically have a lot depth of around 29 metres. Lot widths range from roughly 6 to 28 metres. A major street in the suburb that connects to The Boulevarde is Polding Street, which is a long straight road that joins from The Horsley Drive in Fairfield to the Cumberland Highway in Smithfield and on through Prairiewood, Wetherill Park before ending in Bossley Park. Traffic friction along The Boulevarde helps create a slower, calmer traffic environment through the centre. Commercial properties on the western side of The Boulevarde are served by a continuous rear laneway that facilitates parking, vehicle access, deliveries, waste collection, and other services.

Parking in the town centre is available on-street, with additional spaces provided as basement parking beneath Woolworths and at-grade parking at the Brown Jug Hotel site. Bus routes along Brenan and Polding Streets offer regular connections from Fairfield Heights CBD to Fairfield CBD and Prairiewood, as well as to more distant locations including Liverpool, Blacktown, Bonnyrigg, and Canley Vale. Three evenly spaced raised pedestrian crossings along The Boulevarde enhance pedestrian safety and amenity. The bus route 817 passes through the town centre. Along with the traffic lights at Polding Street, they help regulate traffic flow, allowing pedestrians to cross intermittently at points between the crossings. Fairfield Heights is set away from major arterial roads but is intersected by Polding Street, which could serve as an enhanced east–west public transport link between Prairiewood and Fairfield City Centre.

== Commercial area ==
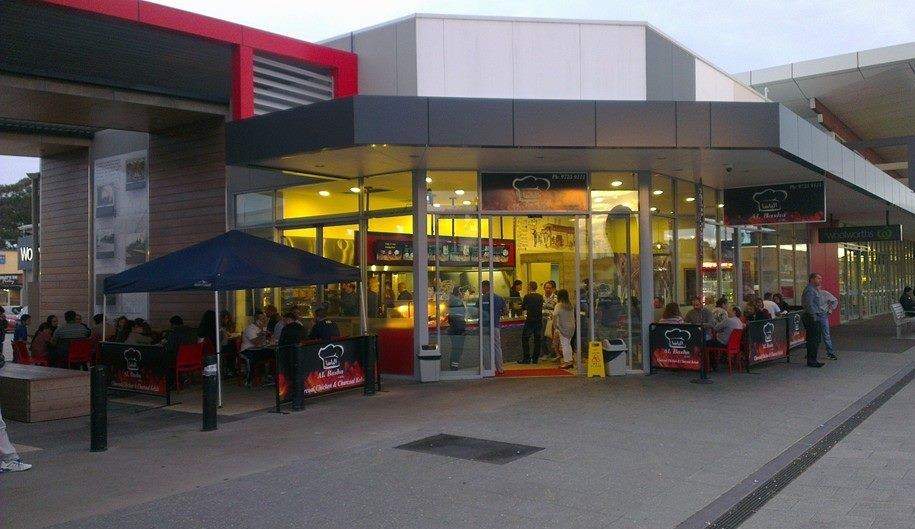
Al Basha, a Middle Eastern restaurant

The commercial area is centred on a north-south oriented street called The Boulevarde, the suburb's main street, which is the highest point in the suburb at 40 metres above sea level, offering striking views of the lower areas to the south and east. A Woolworths exists on The Boulevard, which was opened in 2013. The Brown Jug Hotel was built in the late 1960s.

Commercial properties on the western side of The Boulevarde are supported by a continuous rear laneway that accommodates parking, vehicle access, deliveries, waste collection, and other services. Buses and heavy vehicles travelling along The Boulevarde create occasional noise along the street frontage, which can impact the centre’s overall ambience. However, the bus route also offers valuable local access and connectivity, providing strong support for nearby businesses. A key strength of the Fairfield Heights Town Centre is its concentration of medical services, including medical clinics, day surgery, chiropractic and physiotherapy practices, pathology services, and pharmacies.

=== Culture ===
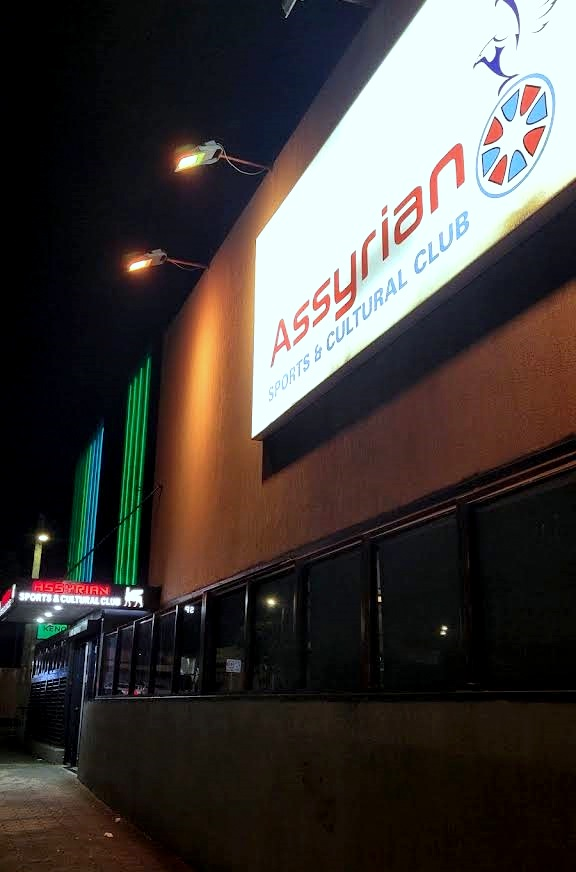
Assyrian Sports and Cultural Club, at night

Assyrian Sports and Cultural Club is the prominent club in the suburb. The club originally opened in 1990 on The Boulevarde, where it held both liquor and gaming licenses. In 1997 the Club bought the premises at 52–54 Stanbrook Street. The project of turning the gymnasium, squash courts and fruit shop into a club began in January 2000. The new club site was opened by former Mayor Anwar Khoshaba in a ceremony that was visited by politicians, Councillors and many Assyrians. In 2003, the reception hall was built and the club grounds were expanded to fit weddings and other social events. A small public plaza area exists adjacent to the Woolworths supermarket. Alfresco dining is limited along The Boulevarde.

One series of the television show Fat Pizza was filmed at a restaurant location in the commercial area. Housos, another television show from the makers of Fat Pizza was filmed on location at the northern end of The Boulevarde where it becomes a cul-de-sac.

== Recreational and sports ==
Prospect View Park is a floodlit sports ground that is home to the historic Smithfield Hotspurs Football Club, which is now Fairfield Hotspurs following a 1999 merger between Smithfield and the Fairfield Heights club. In summer the ground is used as a grade cricket field while in winter two full-size and one junior football fields are used. Fairfield Heights Park is a park that contains natural bushland, children's playgrounds and footpaths for walking or jogging. Although not situated in the suburb, Brenan Park is a very large park with multiple cricket, football and tennis courts that borders the western outskirts of Fairfield Heights.

Cycleways and shared paths within and immediately around the Fairfield Heights CBD are limited. However, The Boulevarde and Oxford Street, located to the north of the town centre, provide direct access to the northern and southern sections of a major 29 km loop cycleway. This loop connects Prospect Reservoir, Western Sydney Parklands, the Orphan School Creek corridor, Canley Vale High School, Fairfield City Centre, the Prospect Creek cycleway, and numerous other dedicated paths that form part of the broader cycling network.

== Education ==
There is one local primary school, Fairfield Heights Public School, established in 1952. Some residents may attend the Fairvale, Fairfield, Fairfield West, Smithfield Public Schools or the private St Gertrude's Catholic Primary School, due to their close vicinity.

There are no high schools within the Fairfield Heights locality. High School students will, depending on their exact location in the suburb and family history, attend Fairfield High School, Fairvale High School or Westfields Sports High School which despite being a specialty sports school, may be available to a limited number of Fairfield Heights local residents.

Fairfield Library and the community library at Smithfield are the nearest libraries for residents of Fairfield Heights. These educational facilities are used as polling locations for local council, state and federal elections.

== Places of worship ==
- St Mary’s Church (Holy Apostolic Catholic Assyrian Church of the East)
- St Mary's Assumption Chaldean Catholic Church (Chaldean Catholic Church)
- St Therese's Catholic Church
- Nguyen Thieu Vietnamese Buddhist temple

== Demographics ==
At the 2021 census, there were 8,269 residents in Fairfield Heights. 29.5% of people were born in Australia. The most common other countries of birth were Iraq 28.4%, Vietnam 8.8%, Syria 8.4%, Cambodia 2.9%, and China 2.9%. The top languages were Assyrian Neo-Aramaic 19.9%, Arabic 14.4%, Vietnamese 11.5%, Chaldean Neo-Aramaic 9.6% and Khmer 2.7%. Combining the varieties of Assyrian and Chaldean, Neo-Aramaic will be the most common language at 29.5%.

The most common ancestries were Assyrian 19.7% and Chaldean 9.1% (creating 28.8% of total Assyrian ancestry), Iraqi 12.2%, Vietnamese 11.0%, and Chinese 8.8%.

The most common responses for religion were Catholic 35.2%, Assyrian Church of the East 12.6%, Buddhism 11.2%, No Religion 9.2%, and Christian (not further defined) 6.8%. Christianity was the largest religious group reported overall (69.1%).

== Notable residents ==
- Jelena Dokić, former tennis player
- Harry Kewell, soccer coach and former soccer player
- Keanu Baccus, soccer player
