= Canley (disambiguation) =

Canley may refer to:

- John Canley (1938-2022) United States Marine Corps Sergeant Major and recipient of the Medal of Honor.
- Canley, a suburb on the west side of Coventry, England, United Kingdom.
- Canley, a fictional London borough, the setting for The Bill, a British television police drama series, which was aired on ITV from 1984 until 2010.

== See also ==
- Canley Vale, New South Wales, a suburb of Sydney, Australia.
- Canley Heights, New South Wales, a suburb of Sydney, Australia.
