= Yennora =

- Suburb
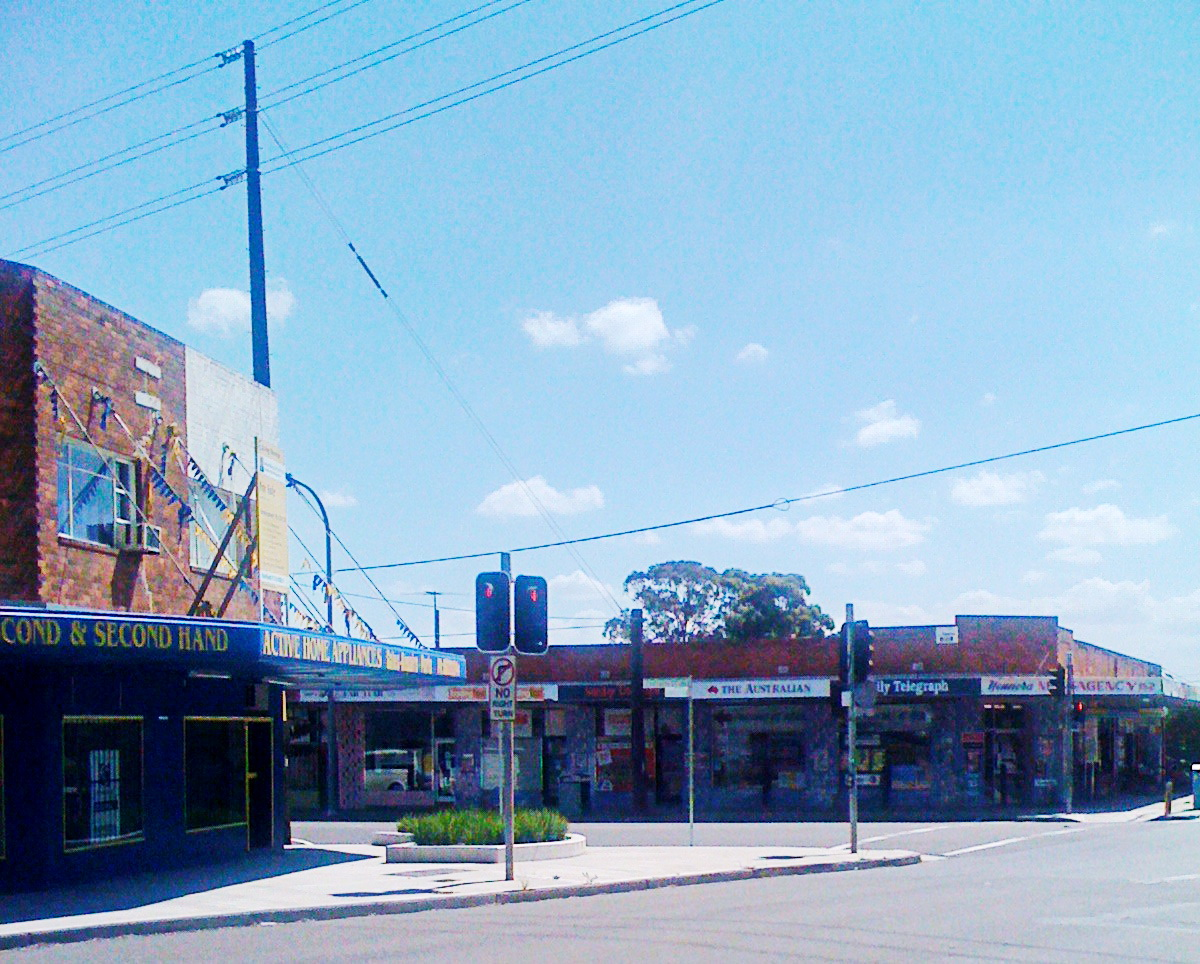
- Yennora Shops

- Interactive map of Yennora
- Coordinates: 33°51′46″S 150°57′58″E
- Country: Australia
- State: New South Wales
- City: Sydney
- LGAs: City of Fairfield; Cumberland Council
- Location: 29 km (18 mi) west of Sydney CBD

Government
  - State electorate: Fairfield
  - Federal division: Blaxland
- Elevation: 21 m (69 ft)

Population
  - Total: 1,675 (2021 census)
- Postcode: 2161
Suburbs around Yennora
Smithfield	Guildford	Guildford
Fairfield	Yennora	Old Guildford
Fairfield	Fairfield East	Old Guildford

Yennora is a suburb of Sydney in the state of New South Wales, Australia, 29 kilometres west of the Sydney central business district. The residential part of the suburb is primarily in the local government area of the City of Fairfield, although the industrial area in west is a part of Cumberland Council. It is part of the Greater Western Sydney region.

== History ==
Yennora is an Aboriginal word meaning walking or to stroll. Aboriginal people from the Dharug Nation have lived in the Fairfield area for over 30,000 years.

European settlement began in Fairfield in the early 19th century. A siding platform was built by the New South Wales Government Railways in 1927 and given the name Yennora. The public school was opened in 1955 and the Wool Stores were established in June 1971.

== Commercial area ==
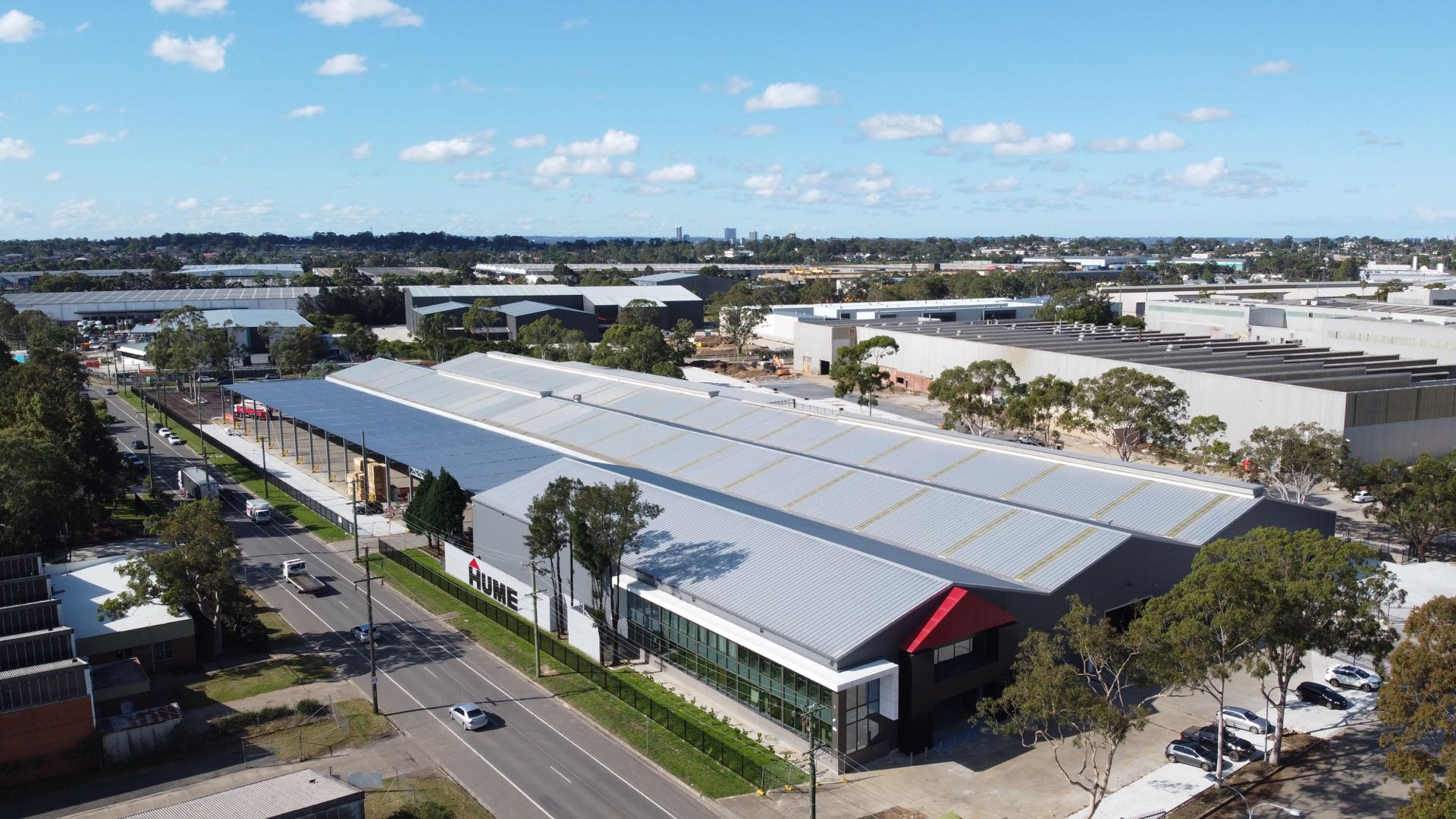
Yennora industrial zone, showing Pine Road and the Hume Building Products warehouses.

A portion of Yennora is dominated by an industrial zone, which includes the 300,000m^{2} Yennora Distribution Centre. It was opened in June 1971 as the Yennora Wool Centre. The Yennora Distribution Centre has a connection to the Old Main South railway line, and is used by Quve for freight services running between Port Botany and the suburb. Other key operators in the area include Toll Group, Woolworths, Linfox, Queensland Rail, and Hume Building Products.

Although the suburb's commercial area is vastly industrial, Yennora does feature some small shops and restaurants that are mostly found in Fairfield Street.

== Recreational ==
Despite its small size, Yennora features a number of urban parks such as Springfield Park, Knight Park and Yennora Park, where they feature children's playgrounds, a sportsground and walking tracks. Fairfield Road Park on Fairfield Road features a large soccer field and it lies on the banks of Prospect Creek, a stream which forms the border between Fairfield and Yennora. Prospect Creek cycleway also leads into the soccer park and Fairfield Road.

== Transport ==
Yennora railway station is on the Old Main South. Trains run frequently from Yennora to Leppington, Richmond and the City Circle. Yennora is also serviced by bus services operated by Transdev NSW.

== Demographics ==
According to the 2021 census, 37.6% of people stated that they were born in Australia, with Vietnam (8.7%), Iraq (7.3%), Lebanon (5.4%), China (2.9%) and Myanmar (2.3%) being other common responses. A high percentage (74.8%) of people spoke a language other than English at home, with Arabic (26.9%), Vietnamese (9.5%), Cantonese (3.0%), Spanish (2.6%) and Karen (2.6%), being the most commonly spoken non-English languages. Top ancestries were Lebanese (13.3%), Australian (10.9%), Vietnamese (9.2%), English (8.1%) and Chinese (7.9%). Common religions were Islam (26.1%), Catholic (20.3%), Not stated (15.6%), No Religion (10.4%) and Buddhism (8.8%). Christianity was the largest group religious group reported overall (42.7%).

The median age of people in Yennora was 43 years. With regards to employment, 42.4% of people were employed full-time, 27.4% were employed part-time, 18.7% were employed but away from work and 12.2% were unemployed. Furthermore, Yennora is known to be the poorest suburb of Sydney, where the median personal income is just $19,000.

== Gallery ==
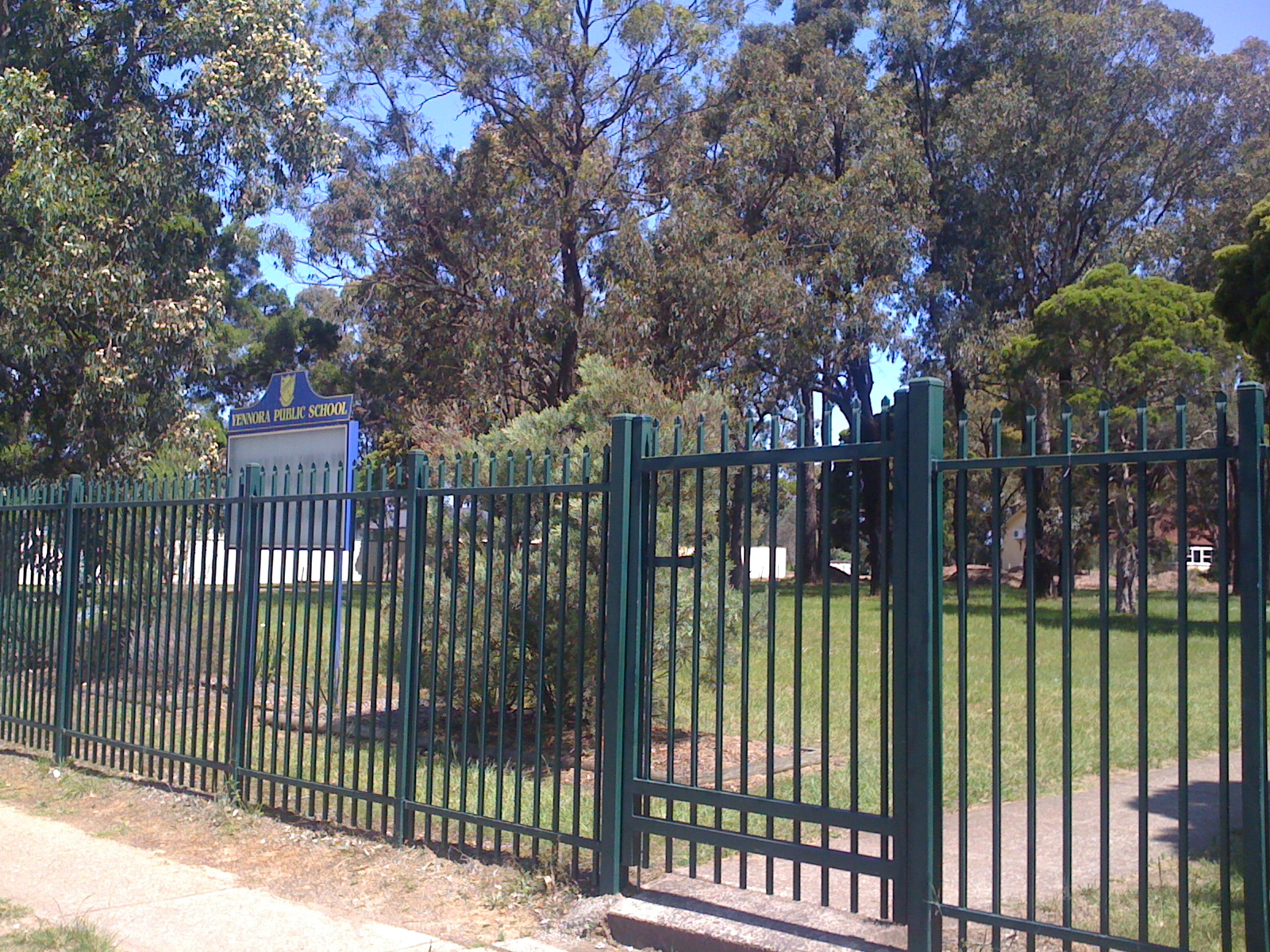
Yennora Public School

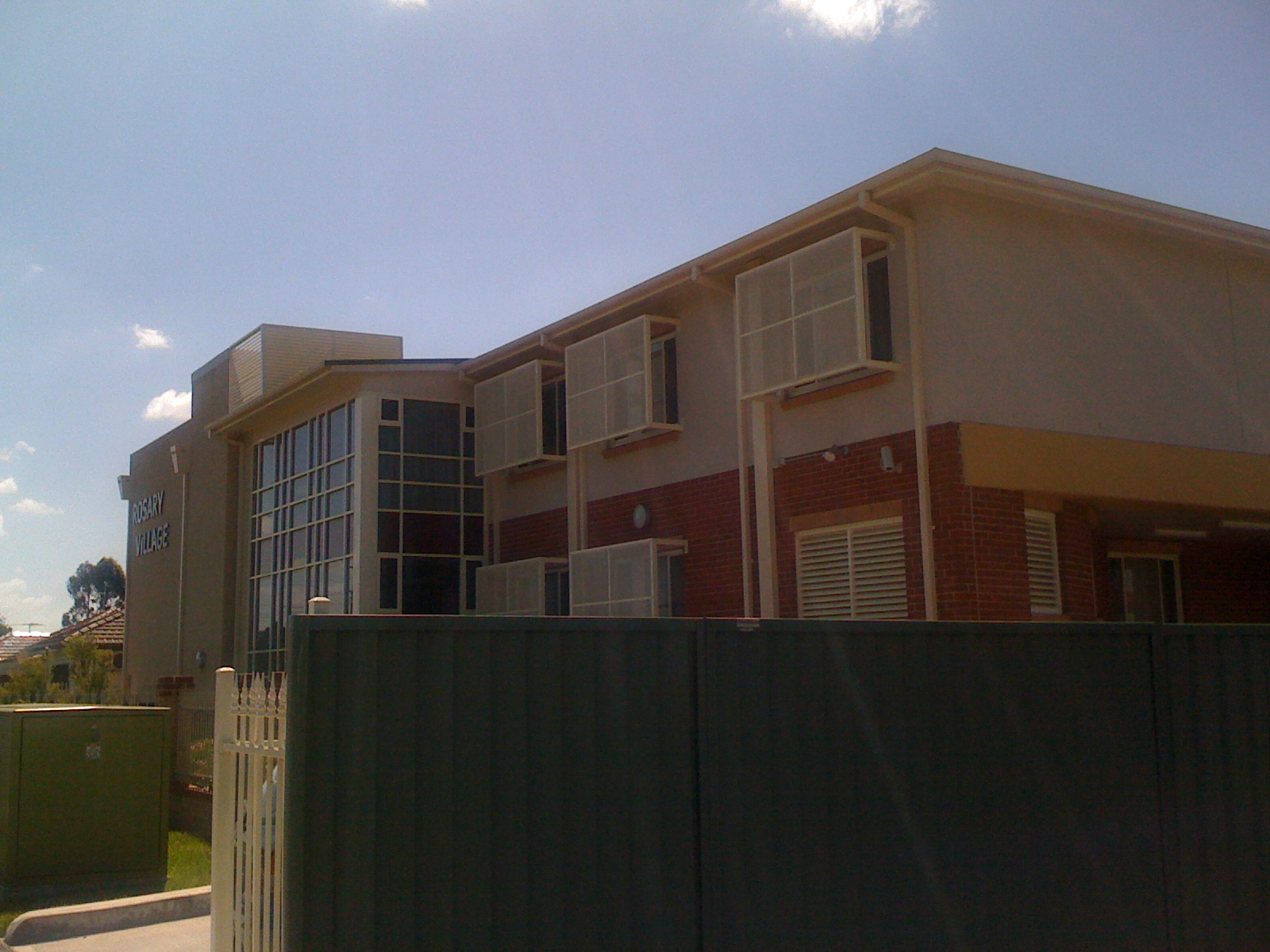
Rosary Village Retirement Centre

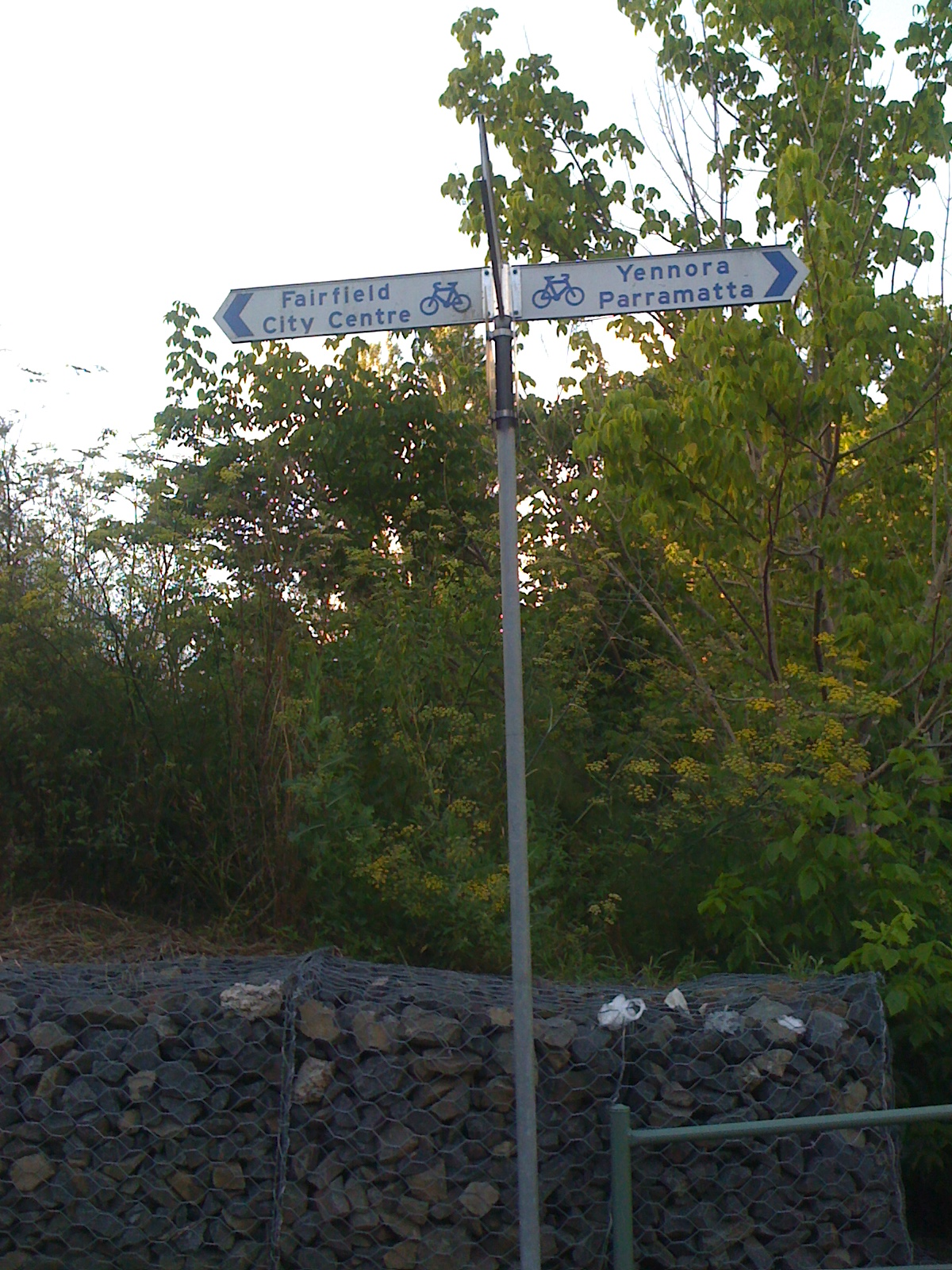
Yennora Railway Station Cycle Path

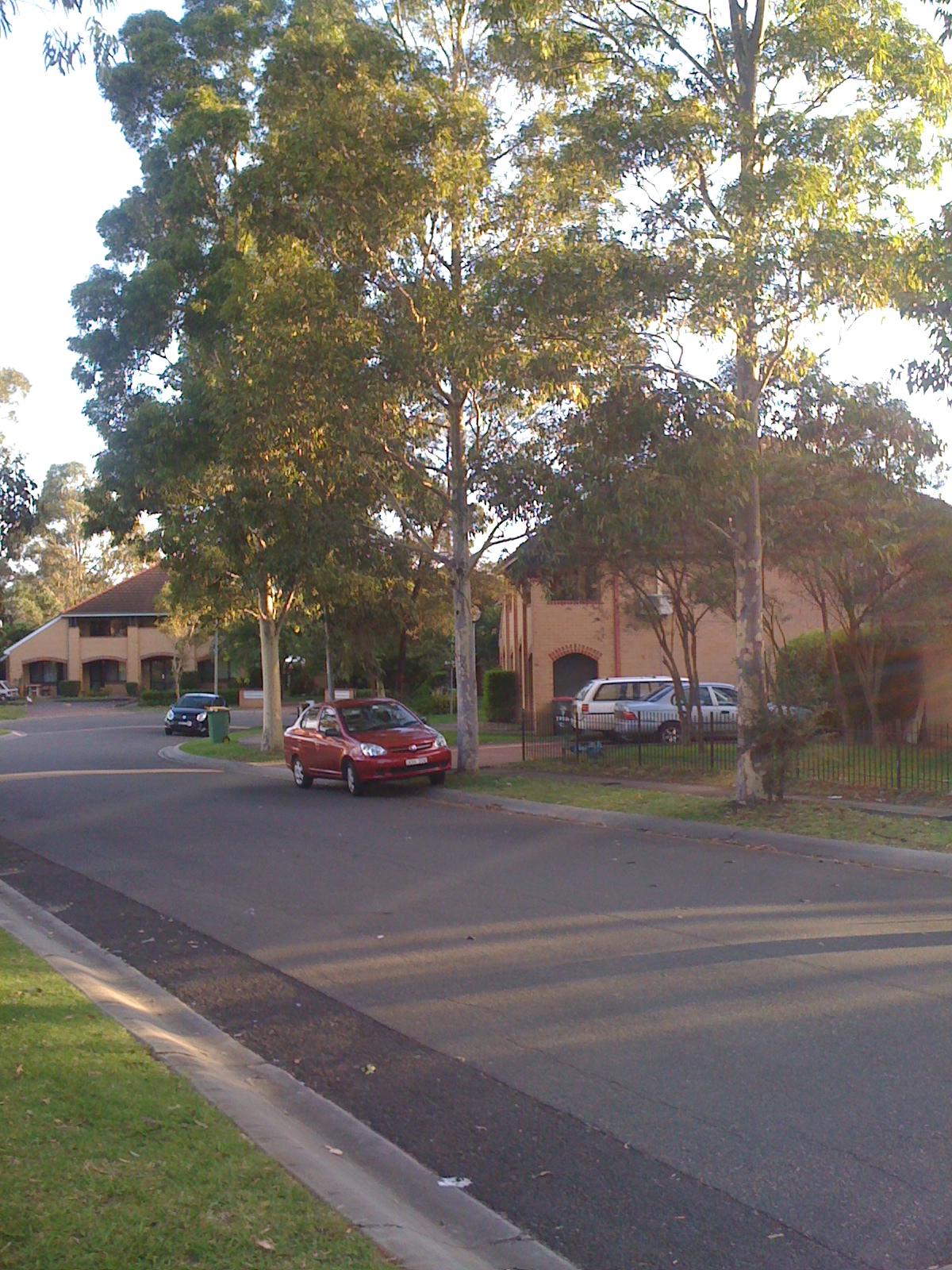
Tara Close

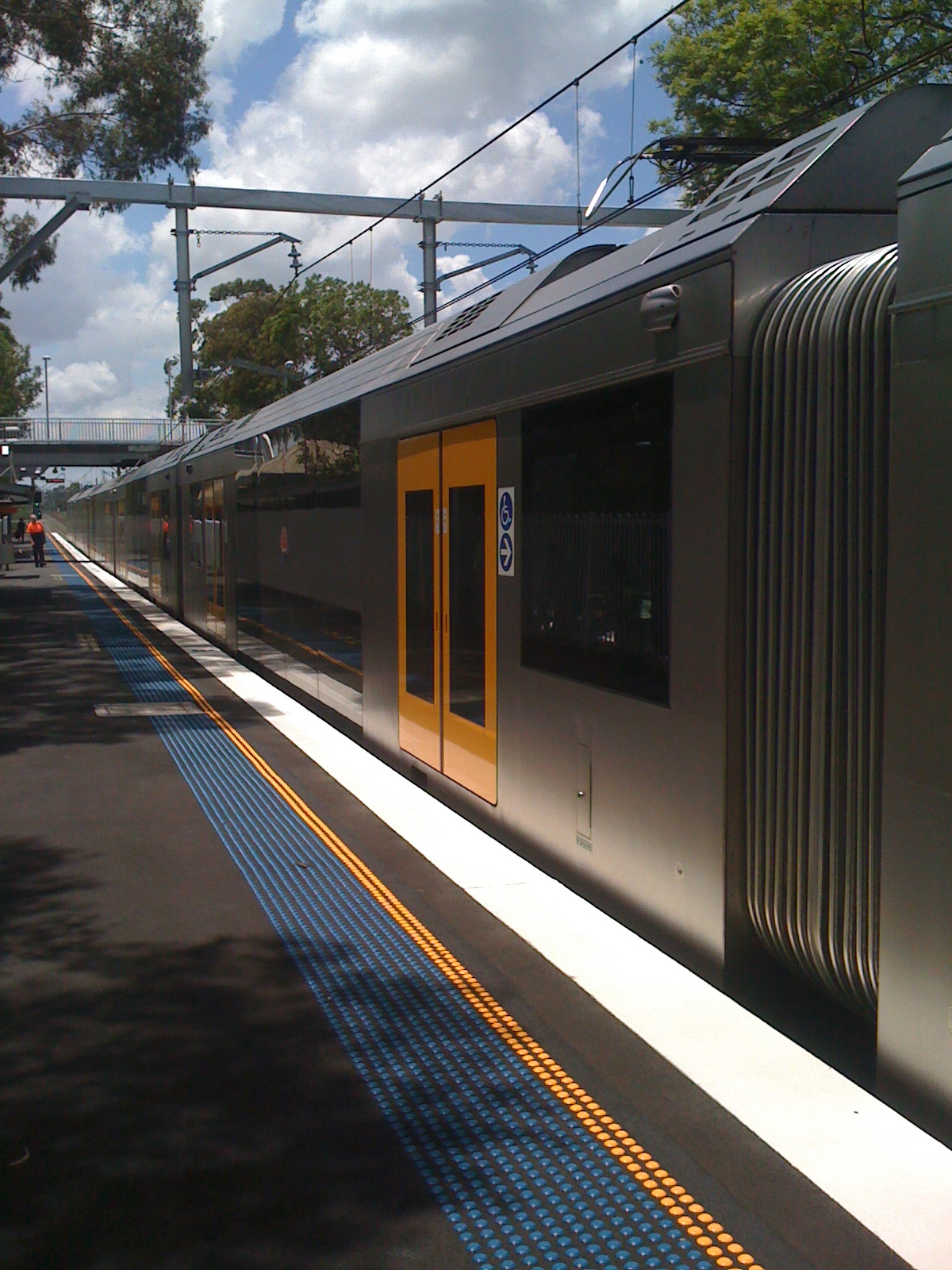
Yennora railway station

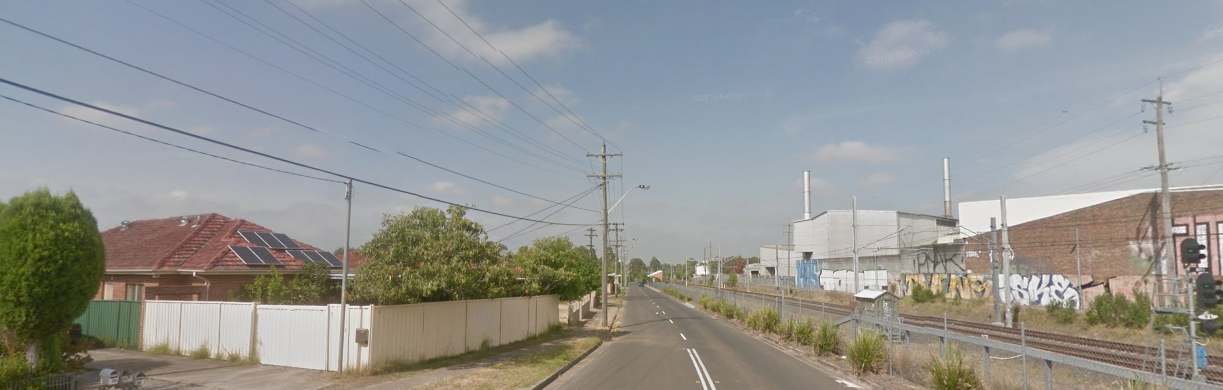
Railway Parade Yennora
