= Fairfield West =

- Suburb
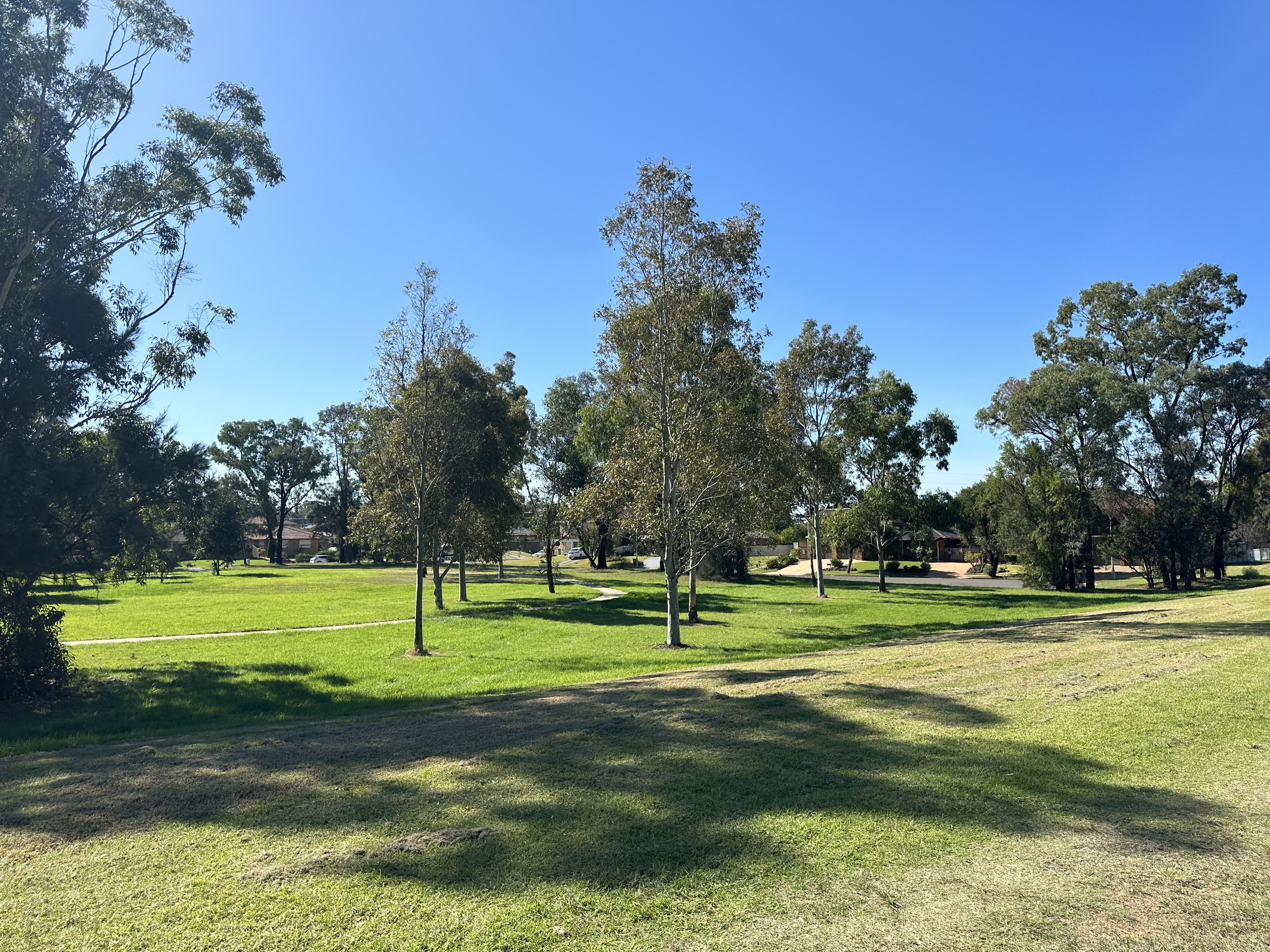
- Dwyer Park

- Interactive map of Fairfield West
- Country: Australia
- State: New South Wales
- City: Sydney
- LGA: City of Fairfield
- Location: 34 km (21 mi) west of Sydney CBD
- Established: 1870s

Government
  - State electorate: Fairfield, Prospect
  - Federal division: Fowler, McMahon

Area
  - Total: 3.2 km^{2} (1.2 sq mi)
- Elevation: 33 m (108 ft)

Population
  - Total: 12,981 (2021 census)
  - Density: 4,060/km^{2} (10,510/sq mi)
- Postcode: 2165
Suburbs around Fairfield West
Wetherill Park	Smithfield West	Smithfield
Prairiewood	Fairfield West	Fairfield Heights
Wakeley	Canley Heights	Canley Vale

Fairfield West is a suburb of Sydney, in the state of New South Wales, Australia. Fairfield West is located 27 kilometres west of the Sydney central business district in the local government area of the City of Fairfield. Fairfield West is part of the Greater Western Sydney region.

Fairfield West shares the postcode of 2165 with the separate suburbs of Fairfield, Fairfield Heights and Fairfield East.

== History ==
When British settlers first arrived in Sydney, the area that is now known as Fairfield West was inhabited by the Cabrogal tribe. A railway station was built at neighbouring Fairfield in 1856 leading to substantial population growth around the station which eventually to Fairfield West being subdivided in the 1870s. At the time it was mostly small farms but a Progress Association was established leading to a post office, school and a sportsground being built in the community. Timber cutting became a significant local industry and the sawmills brought other businesses into the new town, which was well established by the end of the 1800s. Fairfield West Public School was built there in 1925.

== Education ==
Fairfield West residents have the option of sending their children to Westfields Sports High School, Fairvale High School, or to a extent Fairfield High School, and Patrician Brothers' College, Fairfield

== Recreational areas ==
The Endeavour Sports Reserve, located near the confluence of Orphan School Creek and Green Valley Creek, is a large floodlit urban park and a sports ground that features shared soccer, cricket, league and hockey fields, and four tennis courts. The vegetation along the creek side has been identified by the NSW National Parks and Wildlife Service as a Cumberland Plain Endangered Ecological Community. The narrow woodland strip, which border the creek, feature a walking/cycling path, and are dominated by Eucalyptus moluccana and Eucalyptus tereticornis trees. Bukater Park is a passive neighbourhood park comprising open grassland with scattered mature eucalyptus trees and other shade trees, providing local open space for informal recreation and passive leisure within a residential setting. Gethsemane Park is a passive recreation park fronting the Cumberland Highway, comprising open grassed areas with scattered mature eucalypt trees and a shared pedestrian path. Although not in the suburb, Brenan Park is adjacent to the northeastern vicinity of Fairfield West.

== Demographics ==
At the 2021 census, there were 12,981 residents in Fairfield West.

The most common ancestries were Vietnamese (17.7%), Assyrian (11.9%), Chinese (8.8%), Australian (8.4%) and English (8.4%).

38.1% of people were born in Australia. The next most common countries of birth were Iraq (18.0 %), Vietnam (12.7%),Syria (4.7%), Cambodia (2.9%) and Lebanon (1.3%).

In Fairfield West 23.0% of people spoke only English at home. Other languages spoken at home included Vietnamese (18.9%), Assyrian Neo-Aramaic (11.4%), Arabic (11.2%), Chaldean Neo-Aramaic (6.3%) and Spanish (3.0%). If both the Assyrian and Chaldean varieties were combined, then Neo-Aramaic (Sureth) will be the second most common spoken language at 17.7%.

The top responses for religious affiliation were Catholic (35.1%), Buddhism (14.5%), No Religion (12.8%), Unstated (7.1%) and Assyrian Church of the East (6.0%). The majority of dwellings (88.3%) were separate houses, with the remainder of dwellings being semi-detached or townhouses.

== Climate ==
Fairfield West has a humid subtropical climate (Cfa) with warm to hot summers and mild to cool winters.

== Notable people ==
- John Paul Young, Australian Singer
- Vic Hey (1912–1995), member of the Australian Rugby League Hall of Fame.
- Maria Tran, actress and filmmaker who grew up as a resident and went to Fairfield West Public School from year 4–6.
- Moses Suli, Tonga International Rugby League Footballer
