= Electoral district of Fairfield =

Electoral district in New South Wales, Australia

Fairfield New South Wales—Legislative Assembly
- Interactive map of district boundaries from the 2023 state election
- State: New South Wales
- Dates current: 1953–present
- MP: David Saliba
- Party: Labor
- Namesake: Fairfield
- Electors: 53,676 (2019)
- Area: 27.66 km^{2} (10.7 sq mi)
- Demographic: Inner-metropolitan
Electorates around Fairfield:
Prospect	Granville	Granville
Prospect	Fairfield	Auburn
Cabramatta	Cabramatta	East Hills

Fairfield is an electoral district of the Legislative Assembly of the Australian state of New South Wales in Sydney's West. Fairfield has historically been one of the safest Labor seats in New South Wales and is considered a part of Labor's heartland in Western Sydney. It is currently represented by David Saliba of the Labor Party, who was elected at the 2023 New South Wales state election.

Fairfield was created in 1953.

== Geography ==
On its current boundaries, Fairfield includes the suburbs of Carramar, Fairfield, Fairfield East, Fairfield Heights, Guildford West, Old Guildford, Wakeley, Woodpark, Yennora and parts of Canley Vale, Fairfield West, Guildford, Prairiewood, Smithfield and Villawood.

== Demographics ==
Fairfield is similar to much of Western Sydney in the fact that a significant size of the population were either born overseas or have parents who were born overseas. Approximately 50% of the population which is more than double the Australian average at 22.2% were born overseas of which most were born in either East Asian countries such as Vietnam and China or from Middle Eastern countries like Iraq and Lebanon. Despite this high level of foreign born residents, 83.4% had Australian citizenship which is only slightly lower than the national average of 86.1%. As for languages spoken at home English was the most common language spoken by 29.5%, followed by Vietnamese with 14.5%, Arabic at 11.7% and Assyrian at 6.7%. No other languages were spoken by more than 5% of the population. Catholicism was the most common religion followed by nearly one third of the population at 32.6%. This was followed by Buddhism at 16.7%, Islam at 8.3%, Anglicanism at 8.1% and followers of Eastern Orthodox Christianity at 6.6% of the total population. Median incomes for the population aged 15 years and over was in all 3 categories lower than the national average.

== Members for Fairfield ==
Member	Party	Period
Clarrie Earl	Labor	1953–1962
Jack Ferguson	Labor	1962–1968
Eric Bedford	Labor	1968–1981
Janice Crosio	Labor	1981–1988
Geoff Irwin	Labor	1988–1995
Joe Tripodi	Labor	1995–2011
Guy Zangari	Labor	2011–2023
David Saliba	Labor	2023–present

== Election results ==
2023 New South Wales state election: Fairfield
Party	Candidate	Votes	%	±%
Labor	David Saliba	24,340	51.1	−5.8
Liberal	Aaryen Pillai	9,675	20.3	−6.6
Independent	Hikmat Odesh	4,891	10.3	+10.3
Independent	Severino Lovero	3,219	6.8	+6.8
Greens	Monika Ball	2,615	5.5	−1.7
Legalise Cannabis	Jacob Potkonyak	1,841	3.9	+3.9
Public Education	Robyn Leggatt	1,017	2.1	+2.1
Total formal votes		47,598	92.9	−1.2
Informal votes		3,625	7.1	+1.2
Turnout		51,223	85.2	−2.5
Two-party-preferred result
Labor	David Saliba	27,792	70.9	+4.0
Liberal	Aaryen Pillai	11,414	29.1	−4.0
Labor hold		Swing	+4.0	
