= Guy Zangari =

Australian politician

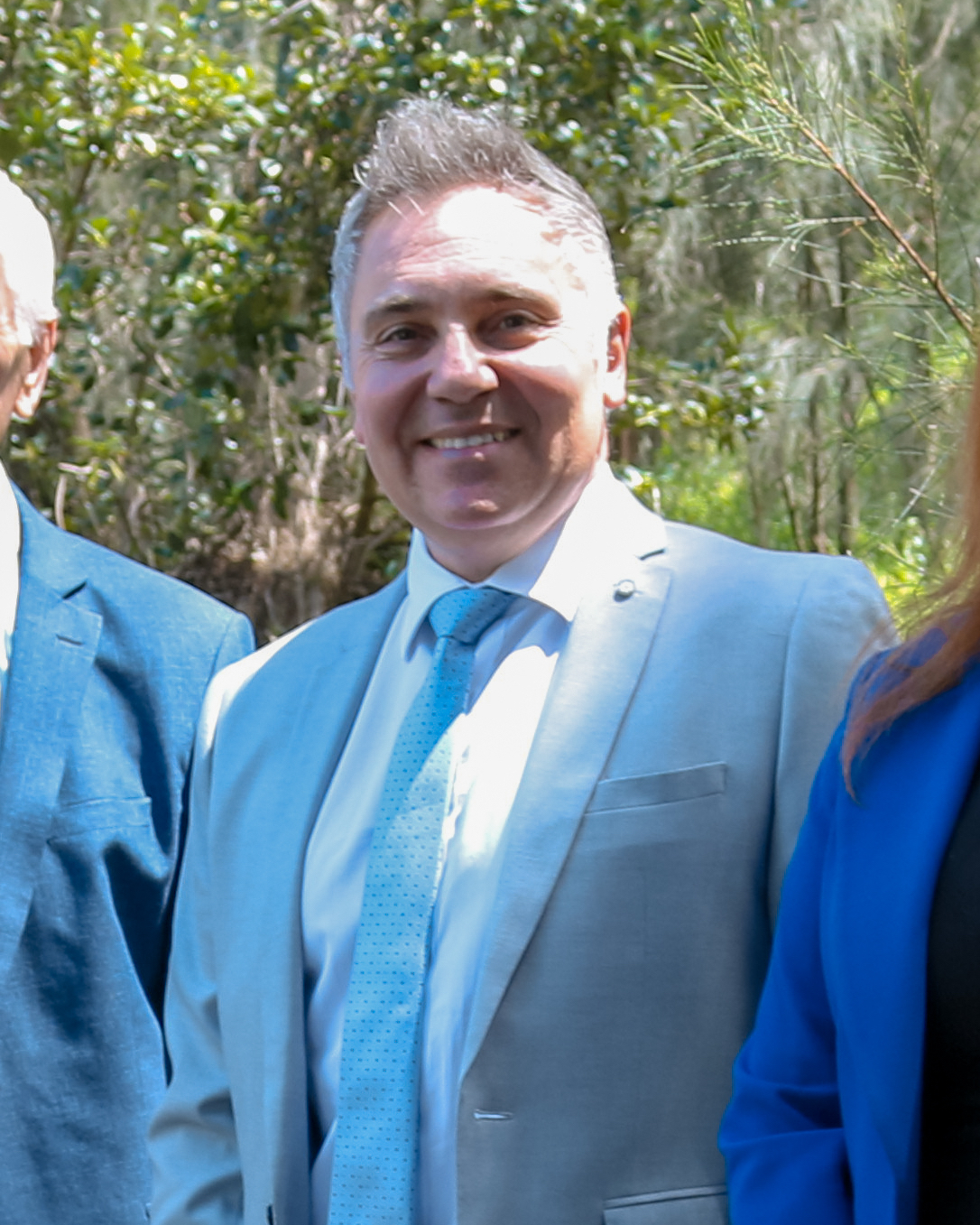

Member of the New South Wales Legislative Assembly for Fairfield
- In office 26 March 2011 – 3 March 2023
- Preceded by: Joe Tripodi
- Succeeded by: David Saliba
Shadow Ministerial offices 2012–2019
Shadow Minister for Police
In office 27 November 2018 – 3 July 2019
Leader	Michael Daley
Preceded by	Himself (as Shadow Minister for Police and Justice)
Succeeded by	Lynda Voltz (as Shadow Minister for Police and Counter-Terrorism)
Shadow Minister for Corrections
In office 9 April 2015 – 3 July 2019
Leader	Luke Foley; Michael Daley
Preceded by	Paul Lynch (as Shadow Minister for Justice)
Succeeded by	Chris Minns
Shadow Minister for Emergency Services
In office 9 April 2015 – 3 July 2019
Leader	Luke Foley; Michael Daley
Preceded by	Ron Hoenig
Succeeded by	Trish Doyle
Shadow Minister for Justice and Police
In office 10 March 2016 – 27 November 2018
Leader	Luke Foley
Preceded by	Jodi McKay
Succeeded by	Himself (as Shadow Minister for Police)
Shadow Minister for Sport
In office 9 April 2015 – 10 March 2016
Leader	Luke Foley
Preceded by	Himself (as Shadow Minister for Sport and Recreation)
Succeeded by	Lynda Voltz
Shadow Minister for Trade, Tourism and Major Events
In office 9 April 2015 – 10 March 2016
Leader	Luke Foley
Preceded by	Mick Veitch (as Shadow Minister for Trade and Investment); Steve Whan (as Shadow Minister for Tourism, Major Events, Hospitality and Racing)
Succeeded by	Penny Sharpe
Shadow Minister for Veterans Affairs
In office 9 April 2015 – 10 March 2016
Leader	Luke Foley
Succeeded by	Lynda Voltz
Shadow Minister for Citizenship and Communities
In office 17 October 2012 – 8 April 2015
Leader	John Robertson; Luke Foley
Preceded by	Robert Furolo
Succeeded by	Sophie Cotsis (as Minister for Multiculturalism)
Shadow Minister for Sport and Recreation
In office 27 March 2014 – 8 April 2015
Leader	John Robertson; Luke Foley
Preceded by	Barry Collier
Succeeded by	Himself (as Shadow Minister for Sport)

Personal details
- Born: Gaetano Zangari; 1970 or 1971 (age 54–55)
- Party: Labor Party
- Spouse: Melissa Pellegrino
- Children: Four
- Education: Australian Catholic University
- Occupation: Teacher

Gaetano "Guy" Zangari (pronounced [ɡaeˈtaːno ddzaŋˈɡaːri]; born 1970 or 1971) is an Australian former politician. He was a Labor Party member of the New South Wales Legislative Assembly from March 2011 to March 2023, representing the electorate of Fairfield. Zangari is a dual Australian and Italian citizen.

Zangari was a teacher at various high schools in Western Sydney for over 16 years. He spent over eight years teaching at Patrician Brothers' College, Fairfield, and later worked as a Pastoral Care Coordinator at Freeman Catholic College in Bonnyrigg.

On 18 November 2010, he was preselected unopposed for the seat of Fairfield to replace the former Member, Joe Tripodi, who announced he would be quitting parliament at the 2011 NSW state election. Zangari won with 40.7% of the votes, compared to Liberal Party candidate Charbel Saliba who received 37.9%. At the 2015 NSW state election, Guy secured 53.71% of the formal vote after preferences giving him a 15.2-point swing back to Labor. At the 2019 NSW State Election, Guy increased his percentage of the vote to 57.23%. He did not re-contest his seat at the 2023 New South Wales state election.

New South Wales Legislative Assembly
Preceded by Joe Tripodi	Member for Fairfield; 2011–2023	Succeeded by David Saliba
