= Old Guildford =

Suburb of New South Wales, Australia

- Suburb
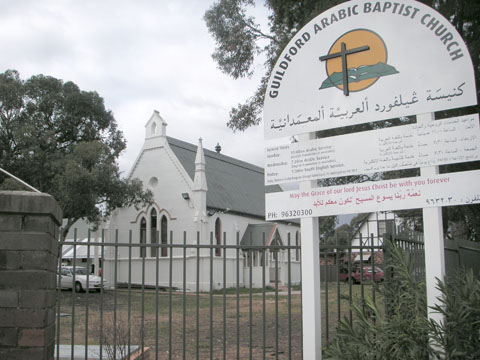
- Guidlford Arabic Baptist Church

- Interactive map of Old Guildford
- Country: Australia
- State: New South Wales
- City: Sydney
- LGA: City of Fairfield
- Location: 28 km (17 mi) west of Sydney CBD
- Established: 1837

Government
  - State electorate: Fairfield
  - Federal division: Blaxland
- Elevation: 34 m (112 ft)

Population
  - Total: 2,857 (2021 census)
- Postcode: 2161
Suburbs around Old Guildford
Guildford	Guildford	Guildford
Yennora	Old Guildford	Chester Hill
Fairfield East	Fairfield East	Chester Hill

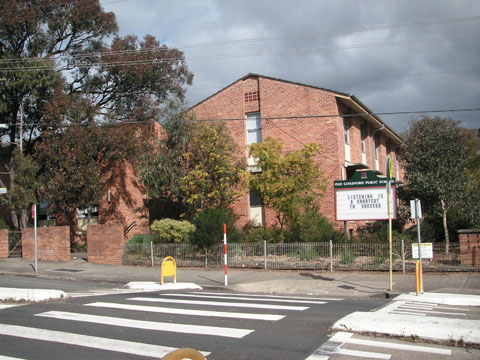
Old Guildford Public School

Old Guildford is a suburb of Sydney, in the state of New South Wales, Australia 28 kilometres west of the Sydney central business district, in the local government area of the City of Fairfield. It is part of the Greater Western Sydney region.

== History ==
Old Guildford and Guildford were named after the Earl of Guildford.

=== Aboriginal culture ===
Prior to colonization, the Dharug people lived in small groups across the Cumberland Plain, including in the area which is now the Woodville Ward. The Bidjigal clan lived around the area which is now Guildford.

=== European settlement ===
Lieutenant Samuel North was granted 640 acres (2.6 km^{2}) here in 1837 and named his property Guildford, as he had ties with the Earl of Guildford. Although the name of the property changed to Orchardleigh in 1843 when it was sold by North, the name Guildford stuck to the region and the small hamlet which developed in the area around Woodville Road. In 1869 a school had opened and a church was built in the 1880s.

In 1876, a railway station was built on the line some distance to the north of the village and named Guildford because it was the closest settlement to the station. The settlement that grew up around the railway station became larger than the original village and ultimately took over the name Guildford with the former settlement becoming known as Old Guildford.

== Population ==
According to the 2021 census, Old Guildford had a population of 2,857 people with a very substantial Arabic speaking population (40.8%). The majority of the suburb's residents (53.3%) were Australian born with the next most common place of birth being Lebanon (12.5%) followed by Afghanistan (2.7%), China (2.7%), Iraq (2.1%) and Vietnam (2.1%). Top ancestries were Lebanese (33.9%), Australian (12.3%), English (7.2%), Chinese (6.1%) and Syrian (2.9%).

The most common responses for religion were Islam 48.4%, Catholic 16.2%, Not stated 11.7%, No Religion 7.3% and Buddhism 3.7%. Islam was the largest religious group reported overall (54.8%).

Old Guildford had a higher than average number of families with children (59.7%) and the average family income of $1,464 per week was significantly less than the national average ($2,120).
