= Fairvale High School =

Location
- Thorney Road, Fairfield West, New South Wales; Australia; 33°52′25″S 150°55′46″E

Information
- Type: Government-funded co-educational comprehensive secondary day school
- Motto: I Learn to Live
- Established: 1969; 57 years ago
- School district: Fairfield
- Educational authority: New South Wales Department of Education
- Principal: Bradley McLeod
- Teaching staff: 107.9 FTE (2025)
- Years: 7–12
- Enrollment: 1320 (2025)
- Campus type: Suburban
- Houses: Wright; Greenway; Newling; Florey
- Colours: Brown and yellow
- Mascot: Bee
- Publication: Fairviews
- Website: fairvale-h.schools.nsw.gov.au

Fairvale High School is a government-funded co-educational comprehensive secondary day school, located in Fairfield West, a south-western suburb of Sydney, New South Wales, Australia.

Established in 1969, the school caters for 1320 students from Year 7 to Year 12 as of 2025. The school is operated by the New South Wales Department of Education. The school's name is portmanteau of the neighbouring suburbs of Fairfield and Canley Vale.

== Campus ==
The school's Binishell is one of the only 15 built across NSW schools, with 4 others remaining across the state. Currently, it is used as an indoor gymnasium, fitted with equipment to suit many sports, 2 change rooms, 2 bathrooms and a gym fitted with strength-training equipment. The first attempt at building the Binishell in 1974 resulted in a collapse due to workers failing to check air pressure, there were no injuries caused by the collapse. There were plans to demolish the Binishell because of maintenance costs and the construction of Block K, but these plans never went through.

New facilities were opened in 2022 under a New South Wales Government program that aimed to provide schools with new and upgraded facilities. Block K provided 30 additional teaching spaces with specialised classrooms for Science and Cooking classes. Block J acts as a multipurpose school hall, it is used for school events such as concerts and talent shows. It can also be used as an indoor Basketball/Netball court.

== Extracurricular activities ==
Student activities and groups include The Duke of Edinburgh's Award, LEOs Club, Personal Development, Health and Physical Education, Rotary, String Ensemble, Vocal group, Junior and Senior Dance ensembles, Various Rock Bands and Student Representative Council.

== Notable alumni ==
- Bill Harrigan – Australian former rugby league referee
- Raechelle Banno – actress (Home and Away)
- Alex Papps – actor and television host
- Tony Popovic – soccer player & coach
