= David Saliba =

Australian politician

Dr David Saliba MP
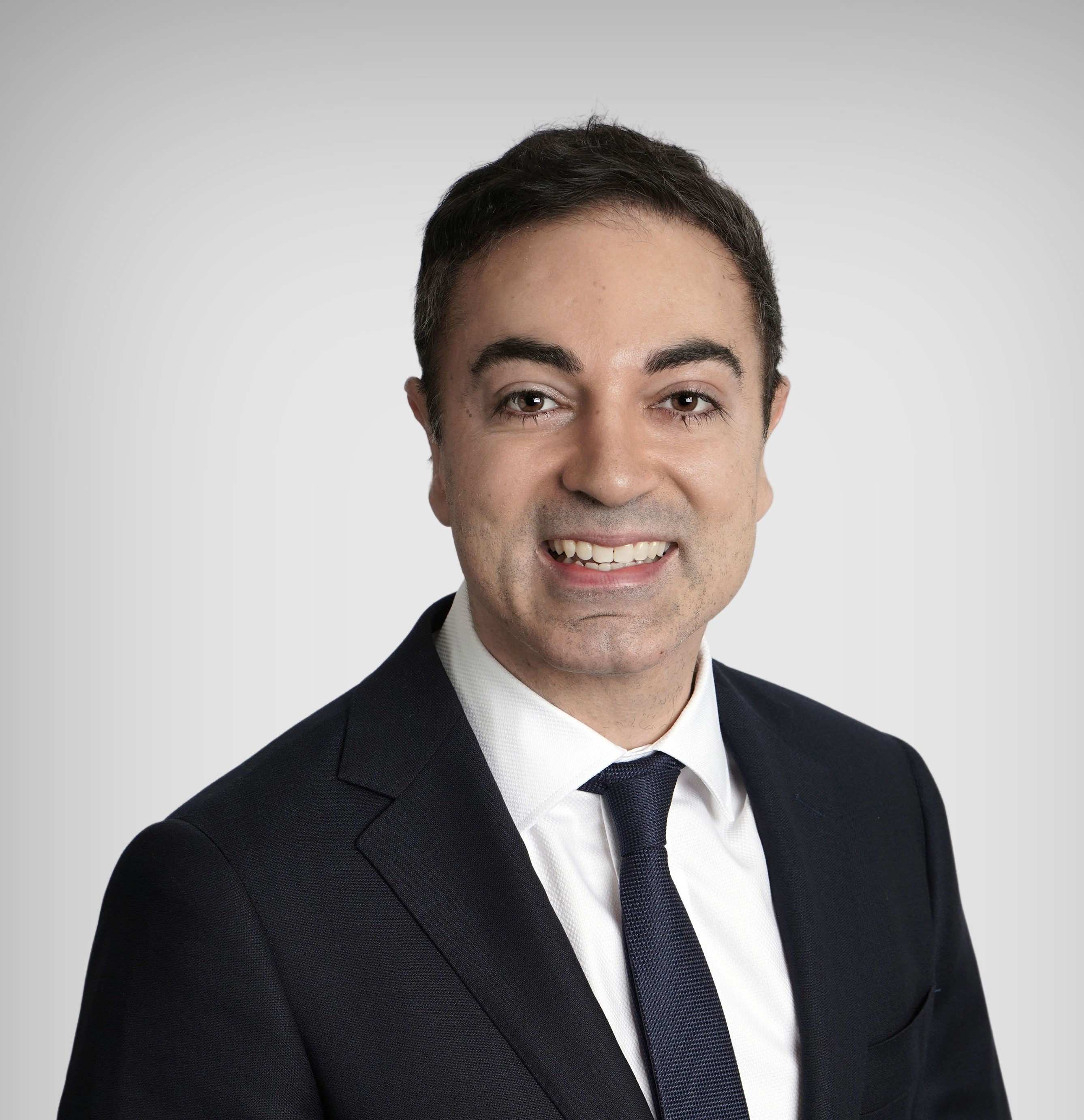

Member of the New South Wales Assembly for Fairfield
- Incumbent
- Assumed office 25 March 2023
- Preceded by: Guy Zangari

Personal details
- Born: 24 April 1985 (age 41) Fairfield, New South Wales, Australia
- Party: Labor
- Education: Western Sydney University; University of Wollongong; UNSW Sydney
- Occupation: Politician

David Saliba is an Australian politician. He has been a Labor member of the New South Wales Legislative Assembly representing the Electoral District of Fairfield since the 2023 New South Wales state election.

== Early life ==
Saliba was born at Fairfield Hospital on 24 April 1985, and was raised in a public housing estate in Cabramatta. He went to Patrician Brothers College, Fairfield. He studied at Western Sydney University and the University of Wollongong. He graduated with degrees in economics and law with double first-class honours, and dux in both honours cohorts. He was also awarded the University Medal in economics. David then completed a Graduate Diploma in Legal Practice (awarded with Distinction) and was admitted as a lawyer in New South Wales.

Saliba went on to complete a PhD at UNSW Sydney. His thesis examined Australian economic policy, business power, and the Australian resources boom.

== Career ==
Saliba taught both economics and law at Western Sydney University. After university, he joined the Australian Federal Police (AFP). He graduated from the Australian Federal Police College and became a Federal Agent in the Sydney Office. He worked in multi-agency teams combatting organised crime, corruption, and drug importations. He later served with the Sydney Joint Counter Terrorism Team. David was awarded two AFP Commissioner's Group Citations for Conspicuous Conduct for operations relating to terrorism, organised crime and corruption.

Saliba also served in the Australian Army Reserve for more than 19 years. He graduated from the part-time general service officer course at the Royal Military College, Duntroon and became an Infantry Captain with operational service in Australia and overseas.

Prior to politics, Saliba worked as a management consultant for KPMG Australia.

Saliba founded the Youth Pathways Network (YPN), a volunteer group aimed at reducing youth unemployment and crime in Western Sydney. He ran a mentoring program for young refugee students settling into Australia, the Say "No" to Crime Forum to help young people stay away from crime, HSC study sessions to help students enter university, and an online advice service for high school students about life after high school as well as assisting with resume drafting and job interviews. He also produced two resource booklets about employment skills and youth crime.

Saliba was also a Non-Executive Director at Community First Step Australia, a not-for-profit organisation providing services for community, childcare, youth and disabilities in Fairfield City.

== Political career ==
Saliba was endorsed as the Labor candidate for the state seat of Fairfield at the 2023 New South Wales Election and was elected to represent the seat.
