= Electoral district of Merrylands =

Former state electoral district of New South Wales, Australia

Merrylands was an electoral district for the Legislative Assembly in the Australian state of New South Wales, named after and including the Sydney suburb of Merrylands. It was first created in 1959 and abolished in 1962. It was recreated in 1968 and abolished in 1988.

== Members for Merrylands ==
First incarnation (1959–1962)
Member	Party	Term
Jack Ferguson	Labor	1959–1962
Second incarnation (1968–1988)
Member	Party	Term
Jack Ferguson	Labor	1968–1984
Geoff Irwin	Labor	1984–1988

== Election results ==
1984 New South Wales state election: Merrylands
Party	Candidate	Votes	%	±%
Labor	Geoff Irwin	17,874	63.7	−11.6
Liberal	Garo Gabrielian	8,159	29.1	+4.4
Independent	Alan Byers	2,045	7.3	+7.3
Total formal votes		28,078	96.0	+0.7
Informal votes		1,156	4.0	−0.7
Turnout		29,234	93.9	+1.5
Two-party-preferred result
Labor	Geoff Irwin		67.4	−7.9
Liberal	Garo Gabrielian		32.6	+7.9
Labor hold		Swing	−7.9	
