= Geoff Irwin =

Australian politician

Geoffrey Stewart (Geoff) Irwin (born 30 March 1948) is an Australian politician. He was a Labor member of the New South Wales Legislative Assembly from 1984 to 1995.

Irwin was first elected to state parliament at the 1984 state election as the Labor member for the safe seat of Merrylands. His district was abolished at the 1988 state election, at which point he transferred to the similarly safe seat of Fairfield. Re-elected again at 1991 state election, Irwin retired at the 1995 state election.

Irwin was born in the western Sydney suburb of Guildford. He is married to former federal Labor MP Julia Irwin.

New South Wales Legislative Assembly
Preceded by Jack Ferguson	Member for Merrylands; 1984–1988	District abolished
Preceded by Janice Crosio	Member for Fairfield; 1988–1995	Succeeded by Joe Tripodi
