= Guildford, New South Wales =

Guildford
- Suburb
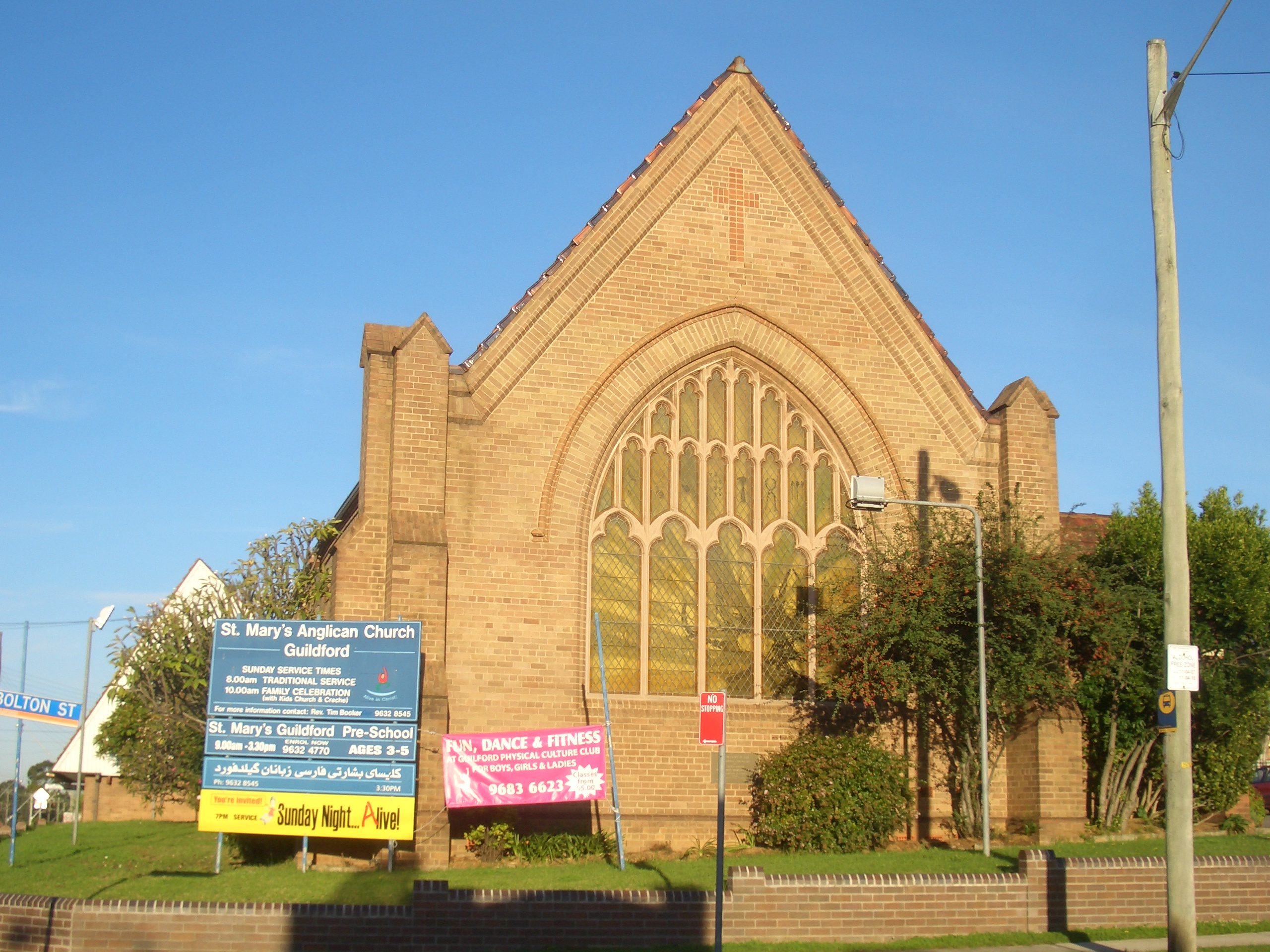
- St Marys Anglican Church

- Interactive map of Guildford
- Coordinates: 33°51′17″S 150°59′3″E
- Country: Australia
- State: New South Wales
- City: Sydney
- LGA: Cumberland City Council
- Location: 27 km (17 mi) west of Sydney CBD
- Established: 1817

Government
  - State electorates: Auburn; Fairfield; Granville
  - Federal division: Blaxland
- Elevation: 29 m (95 ft)

Population
  - Total: 24,091 (2021 census)
- Postcode: 2161
Suburbs around Guildford
Woodpark	Merrylands West	Merrylands
Guildford West	Guildford	South Granville
Yennora	Old Guildford	Chester Hill

Guildford (/ˈɡɪlfərd/) is a suburb of Sydney, in the state of New South Wales, Australia. Guildford is located 27 kilometres west of the Sydney central business district, in the local government area of Cumberland City Council. Guildford is part of the Western Sydney region.

== History ==
Guildford was named in 1837, in honour of the Earl of Guildford.

=== Aboriginal culture ===
Prior to colonisation, the Dharug people lived in small groups across the Cumberland Plain, including in the area which is now the Woodville Ward. The Bidjigal clan lived around the area which is now Guildford.

=== European settlement ===
Lieutenant Samuel North was granted 640 acres (2.6 km^{2}) in this area in 1817 and named his property Guildford, as he had ties with the Earl of Guildford. A small hamlet developed in the area around Woodville Road and by 1870 a school had opened here and a church was built here in the 1880s. After the railway station opened in 1876, a new settlement developed around it and the former settlement became known as Old Guildford.

=== Post-war immigration ===
Guildford is one of a small number of Sydney suburbs which houses the most significant portion of the Arabic-speaking diaspora in Australia. The first arrivals were from Lebanon in the 1970s following its civil war and since then numbers have grown to make Guildford one of Australia's true multicultural places, with many other resident nationalities and identities adding to the harmonious mix.

== Heritage listings ==
Guildford is home to historic house Linnwood, 11–35 Byron Road, which is listed as a building of state significance on the New South Wales Heritage Office State Heritage Register. Linnwood Hall was the Home of George McCredie until his death in 1903. He was a prominent business man (whose brother Arthur was an architect of Sydney's Mark Foy's department store – now Downing Legal Centre), was a Member of Parliament and also Mayor of Municipality of Prospect and Sherwood from 1892–1895.

Sydney's oldest and perhaps most visible above ground water supply pipeline, the heritage-listed Guildford West pipehead and water supply canal which can be seen at Frank Street, skirts most of the southern boundary of Guildford, and stretches from the pipe head at Guildford West to Potts Hill Reservoir near Bankstown. It passes under several streets, as well as Woodville Road (the main arterial road between Liverpool, New South Wales and Parramatta) and over the railway line south of the railway station. The three pipes, each 1.8 metres in diameter were built separately in 1888, 1901 and 1925.

== Location ==
Located in Cumberland Council, Guildford has a variety of schools, parks and sports grounds, pools, a locally significant retail precinct and several neighbourhood shops, a train station with parking, several churches and Turkish mosques and is on bus routes to Bass Hill, Yagoona, Bankstown, Harris Park, Merrylands, Parramatta, Granville, Liverpool, Auburn and Fairfield. The suburb also has notable commercial and industrial areas.

== Transport ==
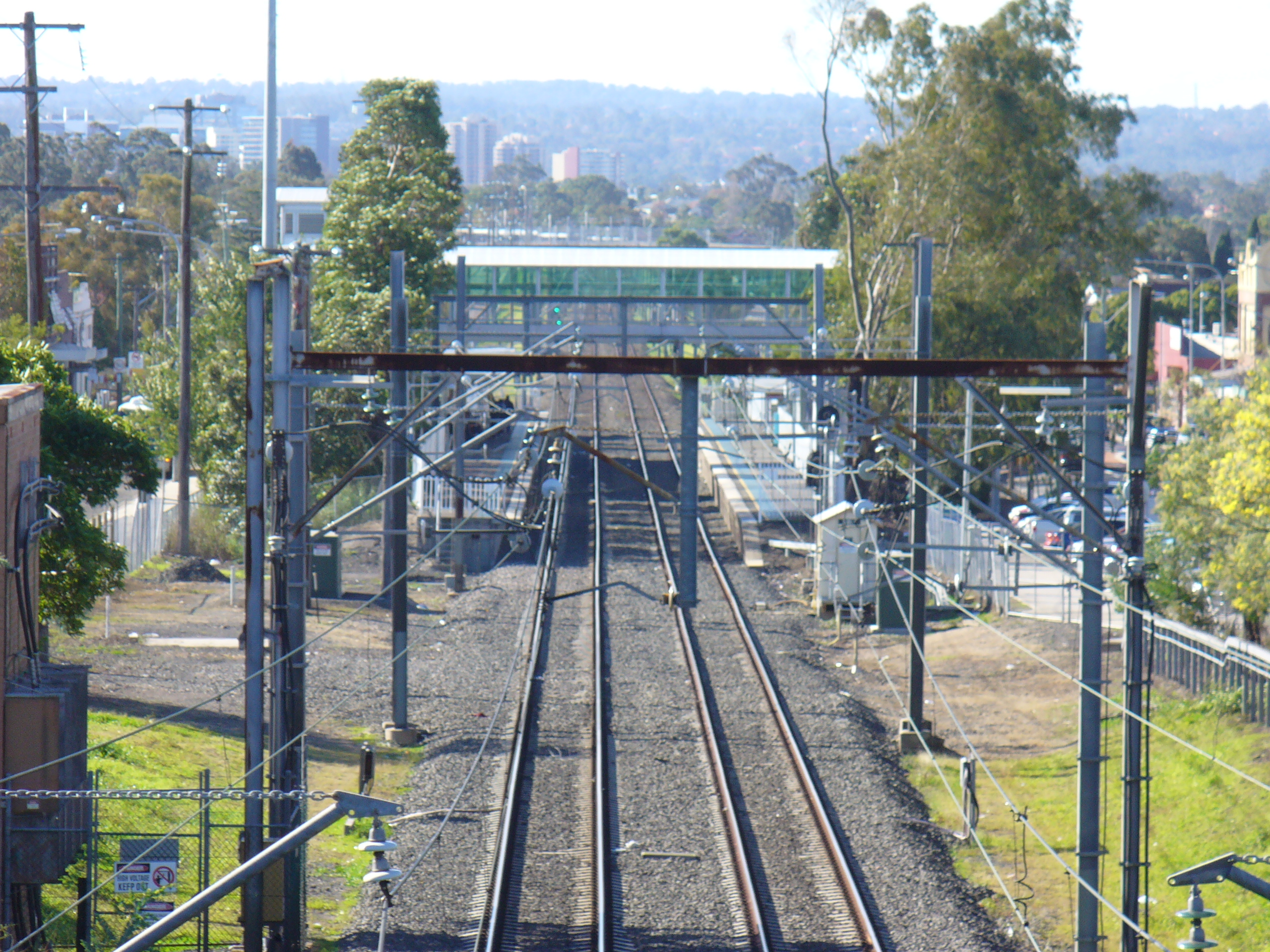
Guildford Railway Station

Guildford railway station is on the Old Main South. Guildford CBD is located around Guildford Railway Station.

== Commercial area ==
Major industrial and commercial areas are located in Guildford Rd, Ferndell St - heading to Chester Hill, Cann St and surrounding streets west side near Guildford Railway Station which run into Yennora (which is 80% industrial). Some buildings in the main streets are in art deco style, as they were constructed in the 1930s. Guildford Rd is ornamented by crepe myrtles. Guildford is the location of the initial Australian market venture outlet of the Kentucky Fried Chicken chain.

== Parks ==
There are several serviceable parks in Guildford.

McCredie Park

Bounded by Guildford Rd, Tamplin Rd, Fowler Rd and Dennistoun Rd. This park complex consists of the local Swimming Centre and sporting fields. Named after George McCredie and was part of his land grant. He was a prominent local business man, Member of Parliament and Mayor of Municipality of Prospect and Sherwood 1892-1895 (now City of Holroyd).

The Swim Centre consists of an indoor all year round heated pool, outdoor pools, a skateboard track and ample parking. The Sporting fields are run by the Guildford Leagues Club.

Guildford Park

Bounded by Railway Terrace, Bursill St and Marian St and Guildford Overbridge. This complex houses the local Bowling Club and Sports grounds and has a hall to rent. Local football, cricket and soccer teams use the main oval.

Campbell Hill Pioneer Reserve

Only main entry off Campbell Hill Rd. Local Pedestrian access is at end of Dudley Rd. Has an area of 19ha with BBQ with shelters, toilets, a mini wetland, half basketball court, and sculptures. The park has some bush areas.

Named after John Thomas Campbell (1770 – 1830) this park is a part of his original Land Grant of 1823 of 1000ac. He was Secretary to Governor Macquarie from 1810–1820, Provost Marshal from 1812-1822. He was a Founder of the Bank of New South Wales (1816-1817) was first President of the Board of Directors.

Woodville Public Golf Course

Only entry off Rawson Rd. Bounded by Woodville Rd, Water Supply Pipeline and Barbers Rd. This 18 hole golf course was also part of John Thomas Campbells Land Grant of 1000ac.

== Demographics ==
At the 2021 census, there were 24,091 residents in Guildford. 45.3% of people were born in Australia, with the top other countries of birth being Lebanon 10.3%, Afghanistan 4.6%, China 3.2%, Pakistan 2.7% and Iraq 2.2%.

The most common ancestries were Lebanese 24.2%, Australian 12.8%, English 9.2%, Chinese 6.6% and Afghan 3.7%.

The most common responses for religion in Guildford were Islam 39.1%, Catholic 21.4%, No Religion 9.9%, Not stated 10.3% and Buddhism 2.8%.

A total of 25.5% of people spoke only English at home. Other languages spoken at home included Arabic 30.2%, Mandarin 3.2%, Hazaraghi 3.2%, Urdu 2.6% and Dari 2.6%.

== Notable people ==
- Samuela Fainu, rugby league player was born in Guildford
- Ivan Milat, serial killer known for the Backpacker murders was born in Guildford
- Haumole Olakau'atu, rugby league player was born in Guildford
- Rock star Rick Springfield
