= Minister for Domestic Manufacturing and Government Procurement =

Former government minister in New South Wales, Australia

- Incumbent; Courtney Houssos since 28 September 2023
- Premier's Department
- Style: The Honourable
- Appointer: Governor of New South Wales
- Inaugural holder: Courtney Houssos
- Formation: 28 September 2023

The Minister for Domestic Manufacturing and Government Procurement is a minister in the Government of New South Wales who has responsibilities for sponsoring and supporting domestic manufacturing and Government procurement in the state of New South Wales, Australia. The title is currently held by The Hon. Courtney Houssos MLC.

== List of ministers ==
Title	Minister	Party	Term start	Term end	Time in office	Notes
Minister for Domestic Manufacturing and Government Procurement	Courtney Houssos	Labor	28 September 2023	incumbent	2 years, 344 days	

== Former titles ==
=== Industry ===
The following individuals have served as the Minister for Industry, or any precedent titles:

Ministerial title	Minister	Party	Ministry	Term start	Term end	Time in office	Notes
Minister of Public Instruction; Minister for Labour and Industry	Jacob Garrard	Free Trade		11 March 1895	15 August 1898	3 years, 157 days	
Minister of Public Instruction; Minister for Labour and Industry	James Hogue	Free Trade		27 August 1898	13 September 1899	1 year, 17 days	
Minister of Public Instruction; Minister for Labour and Industry	John Perry	Protectionist		14 September 1899	27 March 1901	4 years, 274 days	
Minister of Public Instruction; Minister for Labour and Industry	John Perry	Progressive		28 March 1901	14 June 1904	4 years, 274 days	
Minister of Public Instruction; Minister for Labour and Industry	John Fegan	Progressive		17 June 1904	29 August 1904	73 days	
Minister of Public Instruction; Minister for Labour and Industry	Broughton O'Conor	Liberal Reform		29 August 1904	13 May 1907	2 years, 257 days	
Minister of Public Instruction; Minister for Labour and Industry	James Hogue	Liberal Reform		14 May 1907	1 October 1907	140 days	
Minister for Labour and Industry	William Wood	Liberal Reform		2 October 1907	21 January 1908	111 days	
Minister for Labour and Industry	James Hogue	Liberal Reform		22 January 1908	20 October 1910	2 years, 271 days	
Minister for Labour and Industry	George Beeby	Labor		21 October 1910	10 September 1911	324 days	
Minister for Labour and Industry	Campbell Carmichael	Labor		11 September 1911	26 November 1911	76 days	
Minister for Labour and Industry	George Beeby	Labor		27 November 1911	9 December 1912	1 year, 12 days	
Minister for Labour and Industry	Campbell Carmichael	Labor		10 December 1912	29 June 1913	201 days	
Minister for Labour and Industry	James McGowen	Labor		30 June 1913	29 January 1914	213 days	
Minister for Labour and Industry	John Estell	Labor		29 January 1914	31 October 1916	2 years, 276 days	
Minister for Labour and Industry	Henry Hoyle	Labor		31 October 1916	15 November 1916	15 days	
Minister for Labour and Industry	George Beeby	Nationalist		15 November 1916	23 July 1919	2 years, 250 days	
Minister for Labour and Industry	Augustus James	Nationalist		23 July 1919	12 April 1920	264 days	
Minister for Labour and Industry	George Cann	Labor		12 April 1920	10 October 1921	1 year, 181 days	
Minister of Public Instruction and Labour and Industry	Thomas Ley	Nationalist		20 December 1921	20 December 1921	7 hours	
Minister for Labour and Industry	Ernest Farrar	Nationalist		13 April 1922	17 June 1925	3 years, 65 days	
Minister for Labour and Industry	Jack Baddeley	Labor		17 June 1925	18 October 1927	2 years, 123 days	
Minister for Labour and Industry	Ernest Farrar	Nationalist		18 October 1927	3 November 1930	3 years, 16 days	
Minister for Labour and Industry	Jack Baddeley	Labor		4 November 1930	15 October 1931	345 days	
Minister for Labour and Industry	Jack Baddeley	Labor (NSW)		15 October 1931	13 May 1932	211 days	
Minister for Labour and Industry	John Dunningham	Nationalist		16 May 1932	26 May 1938	6 years, 10 days	
Minister for Labour and Industry	Alexander Mair	Nationalist		1 June 1938	13 October 1938	134 days	
Minister for Labour and Industry	Herbert Hawkins	Nationalist		13 October 1938	16 June 1939	246 days	
Minister for Labour and Industry	Athol Richardson	Nationalist		26 June 1939	5 August 1939	51 days	
Minister for Labour and Industry and Social Services	Athol Richardson	Nationalist		5 August 1939	16 August 1939	51 days	
Minister for Labour and Industry and Social Services	George Gollan	Nationalist		16 August 1939	16 May 1941	1 year, 273 days	
Minister for Labour and Industry and Social Services	Hamilton Knight	Labor		16 May 1941	6 February 1947	5 years, 266 days	
Minister for Labour and Industry and Social Welfare	Hamilton Knight	Labor		6 February 1947	29 October 1947	5 years, 266 days	
Minister for Labour and Industry and Social Welfare	Jack Baddeley	Labor		29 October 1947	9 March 1948	132 days	
Minister for Labour and Industry and Social Welfare	Frank Finnan	Labor		9 March 1948	30 June 1950	4 years, 351 days	
Minister for Labour and Industry	Frank Finnan	Labor		30 June 1950	23 February 1953	4 years, 351 days	
Minister for Labour and Industry	Abe Landa	Labor		23 February 1953	15 March 1956	3 years, 21 days	
Minister for Labour and Industry	Jim Maloney	Labor		15 March 1956	13 May 1965	9 years, 59 days	
Minister for Labour and Industry	Eric Willis	Liberal		13 May 1965	11 March 1971	5 years, 302 days	
Minister for Labour and Industry	Frederick Hewitt	Liberal		11 March 1971	14 May 1976	5 years, 64 days	
Minister for Industrial Development; Minister for Decentralisation	Don Day	Labor	Wran (3) (4) (5)	29 February 1980	10 February 1984	3 years, 347 days	
Minister for Industry and Decentralisation	George Paciullo	Labor	Wran (6)	10 February 1984	5 April 1984	55 days	
Minister for Industry and Decentralisation	Eric Bedford	Labor	Wran (7)	5 April 1984	31 December 1985	1 year, 270 days	
Minister for Industry and Decentralisation	Neville Wran	Labor	Wran (7)	1 January 1986	6 February 1986	36 days	
Minister for Industry and Small Business	Peter Cox	Labor	Wran (8); Unsworth	6 February 1986	26 November 1987	1 year, 293 days	
Minister for Commerce	John Della Bosca	Labor	Carr (4); Iemma (1)	2 April 2003	2 April 2007	4 years, 0 days	
Minister for Commerce	Eric Roozendaal	Labor	Iemma (2)	2 April 2007	5 September 2008	1 year, 156 days	
Minister for Commerce	Carmel Tebbutt	Labor	Rees	8 September 2008	14 September 2009	1 year, 6 days	
Minister for Commerce	Jodi McKay	Labor	Rees	14 September 2009	4 December 2009	81 days	
Minister for Commerce	John Robertson	Labor	Keneally	8 December 2009	21 May 2010	164 days	
Minister for Commerce	Paul Lynch	Labor	Keneally	21 May 2010	28 March 2011	311 days	
Minister for Industry, Resources and Energy	Anthony Roberts	Liberal	Baird (2)	2 April 2015	30 January 2017	1 year, 303 days	
Minister for Trade and Industry	Niall Blair	National	Berejiklian (1)	30 January 2017	2 April 2019	2 years, 62 days	
Minister for Regional New South Wales, Industry and Trade	John Barilaro	National	Berejiklian (2)	2 April 2019	6 October 2021	2 years, 187 days	
Minister for Trade and Industry	Stuart Ayres	Liberal	Perrottet (1)	6 October 2021	21 December 2021	76 days	
Treasurer	Daniel Mookhey	Labor	Minns	28 March 2023	5 April 2023	8 days	
Minister for Industry and Trade	Anoulack Chanthivong	Labor	Minns	5 April 2023	incumbent	3 years, 155 days	

=== Small business ===
Title	Minister	Party	Ministry	Term start	Term end	Time in office	Notes
Minister for Small Business and Technology	George Paciullo	Labor	Wran (6)	10 February 1984	5 April 1984	55 days	
Minister for Small Business and Technology	Eric Bedford	Labor	Wran (7)	5 April 1984	31 December 1985	1 year, 270 days	
Minister for Small Business and Technology	Neville Wran	Labor	Wran (7)	1 January 1986	6 February 1986	36 days	
Minister for Industry and Small Business	Peter Cox	Labor	Wran (8); Unsworth	6 February 1986	26 November 1987	1 year, 293 days	
Minister for Small Business	Deirdre Grusovin	Labor	Unsworth	26 November 1987	21 March 1988	116 days	
Minister for Business and Consumer Affairs	Gerry Peacocke	National	Grieiner (1)	25 March 1988	6 June 1991	3 years, 73 days	
Minister for Small Business	Ray Chappell	National	Fahey (3)	26 May 1993	4 April 1995	1 year, 313 days	
Minister for Small Business and Regional Development	Carl Scully	Labor	Carr (1)	4 April 1995	15 December 1995	255 days	
Minister for Small Business	Sandra Nori	Labor	Carr (3)	8 April 1999	2 April 2003	3 years, 359 days	
Minister for Small Business	David Campbell	Labor	Carr (4); Iemma (1)	2 April 2003	2 April 2007	4 years, 0 days	
Minister for Small Business	Joe Tripodi	Labor	Iemma (2)	2 April 2007	5 September 2008	1 year, 156 days	
Minister for Small Business	Tony Stewart	Labor	Rees	8 September 2008	11 November 2008	64 days	
Minister for Small Business	Jodi McKay	Labor	Rees	11 November 2008	30 January 2009	80 days	
Minister for Small Business	Steve Whan	Labor	Rees	30 January 2009	4 December 2009	308 days	
Minister for Small Business	Peter Primrose	Labor	Keneally	4 December 2009	21 May 2010	168 days	
Minister for Small Business	Frank Terenzini	Labor	Keneally	21 May 2010	28 March 2011	311 days	
Minister for Small Business	Katrina Hodgkinson	National	O'Farrell	3 April 2011	17 April 2014	3 years, 14 days	
Minister for Small Business	Andrew Stoner	National	Baird (1)	23 April 2014	17 October 2014	177 days	
Minister for Small Business	John Barilaro	National	Baird (1) (2); Berejiklian (1)	17 October 2014	23 March 2019	4 years, 157 days	
Minister for Finance and Small Business	Damien Tudehope	Liberal	Berejiklian (2)	2 April 2019	21 December 2021	2 years, 263 days	
Minister for Small Business	Eleni Petinos	Liberal	Perrottet (2)	21 December 2021	3 August 2022	225 days	
Minister for Small Business	Victor Dominello	Liberal	Perrottet (2)	3 August 2022	28 March 2023	237 days	
Minister for Small Business	Steve Kamper	Labor	Minns	5 April 2023	17 March 2025	3 years, 155 days	
Minister for Small Business	Janelle Saffin	Labor	Minns	17 March 2025	incumbent	1 year, 174 days	

== See also ==
- List of New South Wales government agencies
