= Members of the New South Wales Legislative Assembly, 1981–1984 =

Members of the New South Wales Legislative Assembly who served in the 47th parliament held their seats from 1981 to 1984. They were elected at the 1981 state election, and at by-elections. The Speaker was Laurie Kelly.

Name	Party	Electorate	Term in office
Richard Amery (Note: Riverstone Labor MLA Tony Johnson resigned on 20 July 1983. Labor candidate Richard Amery won the resulting by-election on 22 October.)	Labor	Riverstone	1983–present
John Akister	Labor	Monaro	1976–1988
Peter Anderson	Labor	Penrith	1978–1988, 1989–1995
David Arblaster	Liberal	Mosman	1972–1984
John Aquilina	Labor	Blacktown	1981–2011
Ian Armstrong	National	Lachlan	1981–2007
Brian Bannon	Labor	Rockdale	1959–1986
Bill Beckroge	Labor	Broken Hill	1981–1999
Eric Bedford	Labor	Cabramatta	1968–1985
Ken Booth	Labor	Wallsend	1960–1988
Don Bowman	Labor	Swansea	1981–1988, 1991–1995
Jack Boyd	National	Byron	1973–1984
Ralph Brading	Labor	Camden	1981–1984
Laurie Brereton	Labor	Heffron	1970–1971, 1973–1990
Ron Brewer	National	Goulburn	1965–1984
Jim Brown	National	Oxley	1959–1984
Tom Cahill (Note: Marrickville Labor MLA Tom Cahill died on 23 June 1983. Labor candidate Andrew Refshauge won the resulting by-election on 22 October.)	Labor	Marrickville	1959–1983
Jim Cameron	Liberal	Northcott	1968–1984
Bob Carr (Note: Maroubra Labor MLA Bill Haigh resigned on 9 August 1983. Labor candidate Bob Carr won the resulting by-election on 22 October.)	Labor	Maroubra	1983–2005
Fred Caterson	Liberal	The Hills	1976–1990
Rodney Cavalier	Labor	Gladesville	1978–1988
Bob Christie	Labor	Seven Hills	1981–1991
Michael Cleary	Labor	Coogee	1974–1991
Jim Clough	Liberal	Eastwood	1956–1988
Mick Clough	Labor	Bathurst	1976–1988, 1991–1999
Peter Collins	Liberal	Willoughby	1981–2003
Peter Cox	Labor	Auburn	1965–1988
Bill Crabtree (Note: Kogarah Labor MLA Bill Crabtree resigned on 23 July 1983. Labor candidate Brian Langton won the resulting by-election on 22 October.)	Labor	Kogarah	1953–1983
Janice Crosio	Labor	Fairfield	1981–1990
Don Day	Labor	Clarence	1971–1984
Bob Debus	Labor	Blue Mountains	1981–1988, 1995–2007
Roger Degen	Labor	Balmain	1968–1984
John Dowd	Liberal	Lane Cove	1975–1991
Bruce Duncan (Note: Lismore MLA Bruce Duncan was elected as a representative of the National Party, but resigned from the party during this term. He served out the remainder of his term as an independent.)	National/Independent	Lismore	1965–1988
Vince Durick	Labor	Lakemba	1964–1984
Michael Egan	Labor	Cronulla	1978–1984
Richard Face	Labor	Charlestown	1972–2003
Jack Ferguson	Labor	Merrylands	1959–1984
Tim Fischer	National	Murray	1971–1980, 1980–1984
Col Fisher	National	Upper Hunter	1970–1988
Pat Flaherty	Labor	Granville	1962–1984
Rosemary Foot	Liberal	Vaucluse	1978–1986
Ken Gabb	Labor	Earlwood	1978–1988
Lin Gordon	Labor	Murrumbidgee	1970–1984
Nick Greiner	Liberal	Ku-ring-gai	1980–1992
Bill Haigh	Labor	Maroubra	1968–1983
John Hatton	Independent	South Coast	1973–1995
Pat Hills	Labor	Elizabeth	1954–1988
Merv Hunter	Labor	Lake Macquarie	1969–1991
Rex Jackson	Labor	Heathcote	1955–1986
Tony Johnson	Labor	Riverstone	1973–1983
Sam Jones	Labor	Waratah	1965–1984
Maurie Keane	Labor	Woronora	1973–1988
Laurie Kelly	Labor	Corrimal	1968–1988
Michael Knight	Labor	Campbelltown	1981–2003
Bill Knott	Labor	Kiama	1978–1986
Stan Knowles	Labor	Ingleburn	1981–1990
Brian Langton	Labor	Kogarah	1983–1999
Ted Mack	Independent	North Shore	1981–1988
Michael Maher (Note: Drummoyne Labor MLA Michael Maher resigned on 26 January 1982. Labor candidate John Murray won the resulting by-election on 17 April.)	Labor	Drummoyne	1973–1982
Harold Mair	Labor	Albury	1978–1988
Bill McCarthy	Labor	Northern Tablelands	1978–1987
Brian McGowan	Labor	Gosford	1976–1988
Garry McIlwaine	Labor	Ryde	1978–1988
Terry Metherell	Liberal	Davidson	1981–1992
Fred Miller	Labor	Bligh	1981–1984
Ric Mochalski	Labor	Bankstown	1980–1986
Harry Moore	Labor	Tuggerah	1981–1991
Tim Moore	Liberal	Gordon	1976–1992
Ron Mulock	Labor	St Marys	1971–1988
John Murray	Labor	Drummoyne	1982–2003
Wal Murray	National	Barwon	1976–1995
Stan Neilly	Labor	Cessnock	1981–1988, 1991–1999
Keith O'Connell	Labor	Peats	1971–1984
Phil O'Neill	Labor	Burwood	1978–1984
George Paciullo	Labor	Liverpool	1971–1989
Ernie Page	Labor	Waverley	1981–2003
Noel Park	National	Tamworth	1973–1991
Gerry Peacocke	National	Dubbo	1981–1999
George Petersen	Labor	Illawarra	1968–1988
Neil Pickard	Liberal	Hornsby	1973–1991
Leon Punch	National	Gloucester	1959–1985
Ernie Quinn	Labor	Wentworthville	1962–1988
Eric Ramsay	Labor	Wollongong	1971–1984
Andrew Refshauge	Labor	Marrickville	1983–2005
Bill Robb	Labor	Miranda	1978–1984
Pat Rogan	Labor	East Hills	1973–1999
Kevin Rozzoli	Liberal	Hawkesbury	1973–2003
Kevin Ryan	Labor	Hurstville	1976–1984
Joe Schipp	Liberal	Wagga Wagga	1975–1999
Terry Sheahan	Labor	Burrinjuck	1973–1988
Matt Singleton	National	Coffs Harbour	1971–1990
Max Smith	Liberal	Pittwater	1978–1986
Alan Stewart	Labor	Manly	1978–1984
Kevin Stewart	Labor	Canterbury	1962–1985
Arthur Wade	Labor	Newcastle	1968–1988
Frank Walker	Labor	Georges River	1970–1988
Allan Walsh	Labor	Maitland	1981–1991
Tom Webster	Labor	Wakehurst	1978–1984
Garry West	National	Orange	1976–1996
Paul Whelan	Labor	Ashfield	1976–2003
Barry Wilde	Labor	Parramatta	1976–1988
Roger Wotton	National	Castlereagh	1968–1971, 1973–1991
Neville Wran	Labor	Bass Hill	1973–1986

== See also ==
- Fourth Wran ministry
- Fifth Wran ministry
- Sixth Wran ministry
- Results of the 1981 New South Wales state election (Legislative Assembly)
- Candidates of the 1981 New South Wales state election
