= Wran ministry (1984) =

76th New South Wales government ministry led by Neville Wran

Sixth Wran ministry
- 76th Cabinet of Government of New South Wales

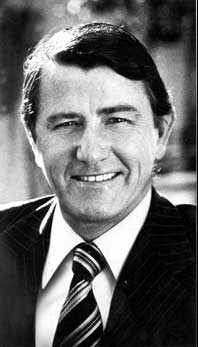
- Premier Neville Wran
- Date formed: 10 February 1984
- Date dissolved: 5 April 1984

People and organisations
- Monarch: Queen Elizabeth II
- Governor: Sir James Rowland
- Premier: Neville Wran
- Deputy Premier: Ron Mulock
- No. of ministers: 19
- Member party: Labor
- Opposition parties: Liberal National coalition
- Opposition leader: Nick Greiner

History
- Predecessor: Fifth Wran ministry
- Successor: Seventh Wran ministry

The Wran ministry (1984) or Sixth Wran ministry was the 76th ministry of the New South Wales Government, and was led by the 35th Premier of New South Wales, Neville Wran, representing the Labor Party. It was the sixth of eight consecutive occasions when Wran was Premier.

== Background ==
Wran had been elected to the Legislative Council of New South Wales by a joint sitting of the New South Wales Parliament on 12 March 1970. He was Leader of the Opposition in the Legislative Council from 22 February 1972. He resigned from the council on 19 October 1973 to switch to the Legislative Assembly, successfully contesting the election for Bass Hill, which he would hold until his retirement in 1986. Wran successfully challenged Pat Hills to become Leader of Labor Party and Leader of the Opposition from 3 December 1973 and became Premier following a narrow one seat victory at the 1976 election.

Labor retained government at the 1981 election, gaining an additional 6 seats despite a 2% swing against Labor, giving a majority of 19 seats in the Legislative Assembly and two seats in the Legislative Council. The reconfiguration of the ministry was triggered by the resignation in February 1984 of Jack Ferguson, who had been Wran's deputy since 1973 and Deputy Premier since 1976.

== Composition of ministry ==
The ministry covers the period from 10 February 1984 when Wran reconfigured his ministry following the resignation of Jack Ferguson, until 5 April 1984 when Wran reconfigured his ministry after the Wran–led Labor Party was re-elected at the 1984 election, and the Seventh Wran ministry was formed.

Portfolio	Minister	Party	Term commence	Term end	Term of office
Premier; Minister for the Arts	Neville Wran	Labor	10 February 1984	5 April 1984	55 days
Deputy Premier; Minister for Health	Ron Mulock	Labor	10 February 1984	5 April 1984	55 days
Minister for Transport	Peter Cox (Note: Retained portfolios from the fifth Wran ministry.)	Labor	10 February 1984	5 April 1984	55 days
Minister for Youth and Community Services; Minister for Housing	Frank Walker	Labor	10 February 1984	5 April 1984	55 days
Minister for Industrial Relations; Minister for Roads	Pat Hills	Labor	10 February 1984	5 April 1984	55 days
Attorney General; Minister for Justice; Minister for Consumer Affairs; Vice-President of the Executive Council; Leader of the Government in Legislative Council	Paul Landa, MLC	Labor	10 February 1984	5 April 1984	55 days
Treasurer	Ken Booth	Labor	10 February 1984	5 April 1984	55 days
Minister for Public Works; Minister for Employment	Laurie Brereton	Labor	10 February 1984	5 April 1984	55 days
Minister for Mineral Resources	Don Day	Labor	10 February 1984	5 April 1984	55 days
Minister for Education	Eric Bedford	Labor	10 February 1984	5 April 1984	55 days
Minister for Local Government	Kevin Stewart	Labor	10 February 1984	5 April 1984	55 days
Minister for Lands; Minister for Ports	Lin Gordon	Labor	10 February 1984	5 April 1984	55 days
Minister for Agriculture and Fisheries	Jack Hallam, MLC	Labor	10 February 1984	5 April 1984	55 days
Minister for Planning and Environment	Terry Sheahan	Labor	10 February 1984	5 April 1984	55 days
Minister for Police and Emergency Services; Corrective Services	Peter Anderson	Labor	10 February 1984	5 April 1984	55 days
Minister for Sport and Recreation; Minister for Tourism	Michael Cleary	Labor	10 February 1984	5 April 1984	55 days
Minister for Water Resources; Minister for Forests; Minister for Aboriginal Affairs	Paul Whelan	Labor	10 February 1984	5 April 1984	55 days
Minister for Industry and Decentralisation; Minister for Small Business and Technology	George Paciullo	Labor	10 February 1984	5 April 1984	55 days
Minister for Energy; Minister for Finance	Rodney Cavalier	Labor	10 February 1984	5 April 1984	55 days

Ministers are members of the Legislative Assembly unless otherwise noted.

== See also ==
- Members of the New South Wales Legislative Assembly, 1981–1984
- Members of the New South Wales Legislative Council, 1981–1984

== Notes ==
Preceded by Fifth Wran ministry (1983–1984)	Sixth Wran ministry 1984	Succeeded by Seventh Wran ministry (1984–1986)
