= Members of the New South Wales Legislative Assembly, 1984–1988 =

Members of the New South Wales Legislative Assembly who served in the 48th parliament held their seats from 1984 to 1988. They were elected at the 1984 state election, and at by-elections. The Speaker was Laurie Kelly.

Name	Party	Electorate	Term in office
John Akister	Labor	Monaro	1976–1988
Richard Amery	Labor	Riverstone	1983–2015
Peter Anderson	Labor	Penrith	1978–1988, 1989–1995
John Aquilina	Labor	Blacktown	1981–2011
Frank Arkell	Independent	Wollongong	1984–1991
Ian Armstrong	National	Lachlan	1981–2007
Ray Aston (Note: Canterbury Labor MLA Kevin Stewart resigned on 31 December 1985. Labor candidate Kevin Moss won the resulting by-election in January 1986.)	Liberal	Vaucluse	1986–1988
Bruce Baird	Liberal	Northcott	1984–1995
Brian Bannon (Note: Bass Hill Labor MLA and Premier of New South Wales Neville Wran resigned on 4 July 1986. Liberal candidate Michael Owen won the resulting by-election later that month.)	Labor	Rockdale	1959–1986
Don Beck	National	Byron	1984–1999
Bill Beckroge	Labor	Broken Hill	1981–1999
Eric Bedford (Note: Cabramatta Labor MLA Eric Bedford resigned on 31 December 1985. Labor candidate John Newman won the resulting by-election in January 1986.)	Labor	Cabramatta	1968–1985
John Booth	Labor	Wakehurst	1984–1991
Ken Booth	Labor	Wallsend	1960–1988
Don Bowman	Labor	Swansea	1981–1988, 1991–1995
Laurie Brereton	Labor	Heffron	1970–1971, 1973–1990
Bob Carr	Labor	Maroubra	1983–2005
Fred Caterson	Liberal	The Hills	1976–1990
Ian Causley	National	Clarence	1984–1996
Rodney Cavalier	Labor	Gladesville	1978–1988
Ray Chappell (Note: Northern Tablelands Labor MLA Bill McCarthy resigned due to ill health on 22 April 1987, dying 3 days later. National Party candidate Ray Chappell won the resulting by-election in May.)	National	Northern Tablelands	1987–1999
Bob Christie	Labor	Seven Hills	1981–1991
Michael Cleary	Labor	Coogee	1974–1991
Jim Clough	Liberal	Eastwood	1956–1988
Mick Clough	Labor	Bathurst	1976–1988, 1991–1999
Peter Collins	Liberal	Willoughby	1981–2003
Peter Cox	Labor	Auburn	1965–1988
Peter Crawford	Labor	Balmain	1984–1988
Janice Crosio	Labor	Fairfield	1981–1990
Adrian Cruickshank	National	Murrumbidgee	1984–1999
Wes Davoren	Labor	Lakemba	1984–1995
Bob Debus	Labor	Blue Mountains	1981–1988, 1995–2007
John Dowd	Liberal	Lane Cove	1975–1991
Tony Doyle (Note: Peats Labor MLA Paul Landa died on 24 November 1984. Labor candidate Tony Doyle won the resulting by-election in February 1985.)	Labor	Peats	1985–1994
Bruce Duncan	Independent	Lismore	1965–1988
Richard Face	Labor	Charlestown	1972–2003
John Fahey	Liberal	Camden	1984–1996
Laurie Ferguson	Labor	Granville	1984–1990
Tim Fischer (Note: Murray-Darling National Party MLA Tim Fischer resigned on 18 October 1984 to contest the seat of Farrer at the 1984 federal election. National Party candidate Jim Small won the resulting by-election in January 1985.)	National	Murray-Darling	1971–1984
Col Fisher	National	Upper Hunter	1970–1988
Rosemary Foot	Liberal	Vaucluse	1978–1986
Ken Gabb	Labor	Earlwood	1978–1988
Nick Greiner	Liberal	Ku-ring-gai	1980–1992
Bob Harrison (Note: Bankstown Labor MLA Ric Mochalski resigned on 1 December 1986 after being charged with fraud. Labor candidate Doug Shedden won the resulting by-election in January 1987.)	Labor	Kiama	1986–1999
John Hatton	Independent	South Coast	1973–1995
David Hay	Liberal	Manly	1984–1991
Pat Hills	Labor	Elizabeth	1954–1988
Merv Hunter	Labor	Lake Macquarie	1969–1991
Geoff Irwin	Labor	Merrylands	1984–1995
Rex Jackson (Note: Rockdale Labor MLA Brian Bannon resigned on 3 July 1986, making way for Labor's preferred candidate for Premier, Barrie Unsworth, to shift from the Legislative Council. Unsworth, as the Labor candidate, won the resulting by-election later that month.)	Labor	Heathcote	1955–1986
Bruce Jeffery	National	Oxley	1984–1999
Maurie Keane	Labor	Woronora	1973–1988
Laurie Kelly	Labor	Corrimal	1968–1988
Malcolm Kerr	Liberal	Cronulla	1984–2011
Michael Knight	Labor	Campbelltown	1981–2003
Bill Knott	Labor	Kiama	1978–1986
Stan Knowles	Labor	Ingleburn	1981–1990
Paul Landa	Labor	Peats	1984
Brian Langton	Labor	Kogarah	1983–1999
Jim Longley (Note: Vaucluse Liberal MLA Rosemary Foot resigned on 13 February 1986. Liberal candidate Ray Aston won the resulting by-election in May.)	Liberal	Pittwater	1986–1996
Wendy Machin (Note: Gloucester National Party MLA Leon Punch resigned on 2 July 1985. National Party candidate Wendy Machin won the resulting by-election in October.)	National	Gloucester	1985–1996
Ted Mack	Independent	North Shore	1981–1988
Harold Mair	Labor	Albury	1978–1988
Bill McCarthy	Labor	Northern Tablelands	1978–1987
Brian McGowan	Labor	Gosford	1976–1988
Garry McIlwaine	Labor	Ryde	1978–1988
Ian McManus	Labor	Burragorang	1987–2003
Terry Metherell	Liberal	Davidson	1981–1992
Ric Mochalski (Note: Heathcote Labor MLA Rex Jackson resigned on 13 August 1986 amidst a corruption scandal that ultimately led to his imprisonment. Labor candidate Ian McManus won the resulting by-election in January 1987.)	Labor	Bankstown	1980–1986
Harry Moore	Labor	Tuggerah	1981–1991
Tim Moore	Liberal	Gordon	1976–1992
Kevin Moss (Note: Kiama Labor MLA Bill Knott resigned on 31 December 1985. Labor candidate Bob Harrison won the resulting by-election in February 1987.)	Labor	Canterbury	1986–2003
Ron Mulock	Labor	St Marys	1971–1988
John Murray	Labor	Drummoyne	1982–2003
Wal Murray	National	Barwon	1976–1995
Stan Neilly	Labor	Cessnock	1981–1988, 1991–1999
John Newman	Labor	Cabramatta	1986–1994
Michael Owen (Note: Independent Pittwater MLA Max Smith resigned on 11 April 1986. Liberal candidate Jim Longley won the resulting by-election in May.)	Liberal	Bass Hill	1986–1988
George Paciullo	Labor	Liverpool	1971–1989
Ernie Page	Labor	Waverley	1981–2003
Noel Park	National	Tamworth	1973–1991
Gerry Peacocke	National	Dubbo	1981–1999
George Petersen	Labor/Illawarra Workers	Illawarra	1968–1988
Ron Phillips	Liberal	Miranda	1984–1999
Neil Pickard	Liberal	Hornsby	1973–1991
John Price (Note: Illawarra MLA George Petersen was expelled from the Labor Party in July 1987 after crossing the floor to vote against his government's changes to the Workers Compensation Act. He sat thereafter as a representative of the Illawarra Workers Party.)	Labor	Waratah	1984–2007
Leon Punch	National	Gloucester	1959–1985
Ernie Quinn	Labor	Wentworthville	1962–1988
Andrew Refshauge	Labor	Marrickville	1983–2005
Pat Rogan	Labor	East Hills	1973–1999
Kevin Rozzoli	Liberal	Hawkesbury	1973–2003
Joe Schipp	Liberal	Wagga Wagga	1975–1999
Terry Sheahan	Labor	Burrinjuck	1973–1988
Doug Shedden	Labor	Bankstown	1987–1999
Matt Singleton	National	Coffs Harbour	1971–1990
Jim Small	National	Murray-Darling	1985–1999
Phillip Smiles	Liberal	Mosman	1984–1993
Max Smith (Note: Pittwater MLA Max Smith was elected as a Liberal, but resigned from the party in 1984 after a falling out with party leader Nick Greiner. He served as an independent until his mid-term resignation in 1986.)	Liberal/Independent	Pittwater	1978–1986
Kevin Stewart	Labor	Canterbury	1962–1985
Barrie Unsworth	Labor	Rockdale	1986–1991
Arthur Wade	Labor	Newcastle	1968–1988
Frank Walker	Labor	Georges River	1970–1988
Allan Walsh	Labor	Maitland	1981–1991
Robert Webster	National	Goulburn	1984–1991
Garry West	National	Orange	1976–1996
Paul Whelan	Labor	Ashfield	1976–2003
Barry Wilde	Labor	Parramatta	1976–1988
Roger Wotton	National	Castlereagh	1968–1971, 1973–1991
Neville Wran	Labor	Bass Hill	1973–1986
Michael Yabsley	Liberal	Bligh	1984–1988, 1988–1994
Guy Yeomans	Liberal	Hurstville	1984–1991
Paul Zammit	Liberal	Burwood	1984–1996

== See also ==
- Seventh Wran ministry
- Eighth Wran ministry
- Unsworth ministry
- Results of the 1984 New South Wales state election (Legislative Assembly)
- Candidates of the 1984 New South Wales state election
