= Wran ministry (1983–1984) =

75th New South Wales government ministry

Fifth Wran ministry
- 75th Cabinet of Government of New South Wales

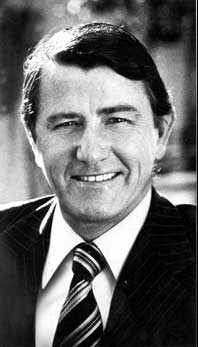
- Premier Neville Wran
- Date formed: 1 February 1983
- Date dissolved: 10 February 1984

People and organisations
- Monarch: Queen Elizabeth II
- Governor: Sir James Rowland
- Premier: Neville Wran
- Deputy Premier: Jack Ferguson
- No. of ministers: 20
- Member party: Labor
- Opposition parties: Liberal National coalition
- Opposition leader: Nick Greiner

History
- Predecessor: Fourth Wran ministry
- Successor: Sixth Wran ministry

The Wran ministry (1983–1984) or Fifth Wran ministry was the 75th ministry of the New South Wales Government, and was led by the 35th Premier of New South Wales, Neville Wran, representing the Labor Party. It was the fifth of eight consecutive occasions when Wran was Premier.

== Background ==
Wran had been elected to the Legislative Council of New South Wales by a joint sitting of the New South Wales Parliament on 12 March 1970. He was Leader of the Opposition in the Legislative Council from 22 February 1972. He resigned from the council on 19 October 1973 to switch to the Legislative Assembly, successfully contesting the election for Bass Hill, which he would hold until his retirement in 1986. Wran successfully challenged Pat Hills to become Leader of Labor Party and Leader of the Opposition from 3 December 1973 and became Premier following a narrow one seat victory at the 1976 election.

Labor retained government at the 1981 election, gaining an additional 6 seats despite a 2% swing against Labor, giving a majority of 19 seats in the Legislative Assembly and two seats in the Legislative Council.

During the course of this ministry, Wran stood aside for two months from May 1983 while Sir Laurence Street conducted a Royal Commission into claims made by the Australian Broadcasting Corporation current affairs show Four Corners that Chief Magistrate Murray Farquhar had said that Wran wanted charges against Kevin Humphreys to be dismissed. After two months of hearings the Royal Commission found that Farquhar had attempted to pervert the course of justice, but Wran was exonerated and resumed the office of Premier. During this time allegations were made that Rex Jackson, the Minister for Corrective Services, was accepting bribes connected with an early-release scheme, with Wran demanding Jackson's resignation in October 1983.

== Composition of ministry ==
The ministry covers the period from 1 February 1983 when Wran reconfigured his ministry. There were two minor rearrangements of the ministry, with Jackson resigning in October 1983, (Note: Rex Jackson resigned in October 1983 as a result of bribery allegations. Peter Anderson took on his portfolio of Corrective Services and Laurie Brereton took on his portfolio of Roads.) and George Paciullo was promoted to the ministry in November 1983. (Note: On 10 November 1983 George Paciullo was promoted to the ministry, taking on the portfolio of Roads from Laurie Brereton.) The ministry ended on 10 February 1984 when Jack Ferguson, who had been Wran's deputy since 1973, resigned as Deputy Premier announcing that he would not be contesting the next election, and the Sixth Wran ministry was formed.

Portfolio	Minister	Party	Term commence	Term end	Term of office
Premier	Neville Wran	Labor	1 February 1983	10 February 1984	1 year, 9 days
Deputy Premier; Minister for Public Works; Minister for Ports	Jack Ferguson (Note: Retained portfolios from the fourth Wran ministry.)	Labor	1 February 1983	10 February 1984	1 year, 9 days
Minister for Transport	Peter Cox	Labor	1 February 1983	10 February 1984	1 year, 9 days
Minister for Youth and Community Services; Minister for Aboriginal Affairs; Minister for Housing	Frank Walker	Labor	1 February 1983	10 February 1984	1 year, 9 days
Minister for Industrial Relations; Minister for Technology	Pat Hills	Labor	1 February 1983	10 February 1984	1 year, 9 days
Attorney General; Minister for Justice; Minister for Consumer Affairs; Vice-President of the Executive Council; Leader of the Government in Legislative Council	Paul Landa, MLC	Labor	1 February 1983	10 February 1984	1 year, 9 days
Treasurer	Ken Booth	Labor	1 February 1983	10 February 1984	1 year, 9 days
Minister for Industrial Development; Minister for Decentralisation	Don Day	Labor	1 February 1983	10 February 1984	1 year, 9 days
Minister for Corrective Services	Rex Jackson	Labor	1 February 1983	27 October 1983	268 days
Minister for Corrective Services	Peter Anderson	Labor	27 October 1983	10 February 1984	106 days
Minister for Roads	Rex Jackson	Labor	1 February 1983	27 October 1983	268 days
Minister for Roads	Laurie Brereton	Labor	27 October 1983	10 November 1983	14 days
Minister for Roads	George Paciullo	Labor	10 November 1983	10 February 1984	92 days
Minister for Planning and Environment	Eric Bedford	Labor	1 February 1983	10 February 1984	1 year, 9 days
Minister for Mineral Resources	Kevin Stewart	Labor	1 February 1983	10 February 1984	1 year, 9 days
Minister for Education	Ron Mulock	Labor	1 February 1983	10 February 1984	1 year, 9 days
Minister for Local Government; Minister for Lands	Lin Gordon	Labor	1 February 1983	10 February 1984	1 year, 9 days
Minister for Agriculture and Fisheries	Jack Hallam, MLC	Labor	1 February 1983	10 February 1984	1 year, 9 days
Minister for Energy; Minister for Finance	Terry Sheahan	Labor	1 February 1983	10 February 1984	1 year, 9 days
Minister for Health	Laurie Brereton	Labor	1 February 1983	10 February 1984	1 year, 9 days
Minister for Police and Emergency Services	Peter Anderson	Labor	1 February 1983	10 February 1984	1 year, 9 days
Minister for Leisure, Sport and Tourism	Michael Cleary	Labor	1 February 1983	10 February 1984	1 year, 9 days
Minister for Water Resources; Minister for Forests	Paul Whelan	Labor	1 February 1983	10 February 1984	1 year, 9 days

Ministers are members of the Legislative Assembly unless otherwise noted.

== See also ==
- Members of the New South Wales Legislative Assembly, 1981–1984
- Members of the New South Wales Legislative Council, 1981–1984

== Notes ==
Preceded by Fourth Wran ministry (1981–1983)	Fifth Wran ministry 1983–1984	Succeeded by Sixth Wran ministry (1984)
