= Wran ministry (1981–1983) =

74th New South Wales government ministry led by Neville Wran

Fourth Wran ministry
- 74th Cabinet of Government of New South Wales

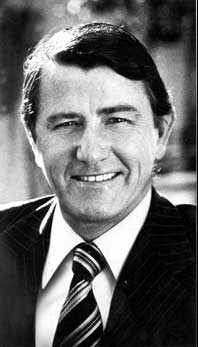
- Premier Neville Wran
- Date formed: 2 October 1981
- Date dissolved: 1 February 1983

People and organisations
- Monarch: Queen Elizabeth II
- Governor: Sir James Rowland
- Premier: Neville Wran
- Deputy Premier: Jack Ferguson
- No. of ministers: 19
- Member party: Labor
- Opposition parties: Liberal National coalition
- Opposition leader: John Dowd

History
- Predecessor: Third Wran ministry
- Successor: Fifth Wran ministry

The Wran ministry (1981–1983) or Fourth Wran ministry was the 74th ministry of the New South Wales Government, and was led by the 35th Premier of New South Wales, Neville Wran, representing the Labor Party. It was the fourth of eight consecutive occasions when Wran was Premier.

== Background ==
Wran had been elected to the Legislative Council of New South Wales by a joint sitting of the New South Wales Parliament on 12 March 1970. He was Leader of the Opposition in the Legislative Council from 22 February 1972. He resigned from the council on 19 October 1973 to switch to the Legislative Assembly, successfully contesting the election for Bass Hill, which he would hold until his retirement in 1986. Wran successfully challenged Pat Hills to become Leader of Labor Party and Leader of the Opposition from 3 December 1973 and became Premier following a narrow one seat victory at the 1976 election.

Labor retained government at the 1981 election, gaining an additional 6 seats despite a 2% swing against Labor, giving a majority of 19 seats in the Legislative Assembly and two seats in the Legislative Council.

== Composition of ministry ==
The ministry covers the period from 2 October 1981. There was a slight rearrangement in May 1982 that altered the titles of two ministers. The ministry ended on 1 February 1983, when Wran reconfigured his ministry, and the Fifth Wran ministry was formed.

Portfolio	Minister	Party	Term commence	Term end	Term of office
Premier; Minister for Mineral Resources	Neville Wran	Labor	2 October 1981	1 February 1983	1 year, 122 days
Deputy Premier; Minister for Public Works; Minister for Ports	Jack Ferguson (Note: Retained portfolios from the third Wran ministry.)	Labor	2 October 1981	1 February 1983	1 year, 122 days
Minister for Transport	Peter Cox	Labor	2 October 1981	1 February 1983	1 year, 122 days
Attorney General; Minister for Justice; Minister for Aboriginal Affairs	Frank Walker, QC	Labor	2 October 1981	1 February 1983	1 year, 122 days
Minister for Industrial Relations; Minister for Technology	Pat Hills	Labor	2 October 1981	1 February 1983	1 year, 122 days
Minister for Energy; Minister for Water Resources; Vice-President of the Executive Council; Leader of the Government in Legislative Council	Paul Landa, MLC	Labor	2 October 1981	1 February 1983	1 year, 122 days
Treasurer	Ken Booth	Labor	2 October 1981	1 February 1983	1 year, 122 days
Minister for Industrial Development; Minister for Decentralisation	Don Day	Labor	2 October 1981	1 February 1983	1 year, 122 days
Minister for Corrective Services	Rex Jackson	Labor	2 October 1981	1 February 1983	1 year, 122 days
Minister for Planning and Environment	Eric Bedford	Labor	2 October 1981	1 February 1983	1 year, 122 days
Minister for Youth and Community Services	Kevin Stewart	Labor	2 October 1981	1 February 1983	1 year, 122 days
Minister for Education	Ron Mulock	Labor	2 October 1981	1 February 1983	1 year, 122 days
Minister for Local Government; Minister for Lands; Minister for Forests	Lin Gordon	Labor	2 October 1981	1 February 1983	1 year, 122 days
Minister for Agriculture and Fisheries	Jack Hallam, MLC	Labor	2 October 1981	1 February 1983	1 year, 122 days
Minister for Housing; Minister for Co-operative Societies; Minister Assisting the Premier	Terry Sheahan	Labor	2 October 1981	1 February 1983	1 year, 122 days
Minister for Health	Laurie Brereton	Labor	2 October 1981	1 February 1983	1 year, 122 days
Minister for Police; Minister for Services	Peter Anderson	Labor	2 October 1981	26 May 1982	1 year, 122 days
Minister for Police and Emergency Services	Peter Anderson	Labor	26 May 1982	1 February 1983	1 year, 122 days
Minister for Sport and Recreation; Minister for Tourism	Michael Cleary	Labor	2 October 1981	26 May 1982	236 days
Minister for Leisure, Sport and Tourism	Michael Cleary	Labor	26 May 1982	1 February 1983	251 days
Minister for Consumer Affairs; Minister for Roads	Paul Whelan	Labor	2 October 1981	1 February 1983	1 year, 122 days

Ministers are members of the Legislative Assembly unless otherwise noted.

== See also ==
- Members of the New South Wales Legislative Assembly, 1981–1984
- Members of the New South Wales Legislative Council, 1981–1984

== Notes ==
Preceded by Third Wran ministry (1980–1981)	Fourth Wran ministry 1981–1983	Succeeded by Fifth Wran ministry (1983–1984)
