= Wran ministry (1986) =

78th New South Wales government ministry, led by Neville Wran

Eighth Wran ministry
- 78th Cabinet of Government of New South Wales

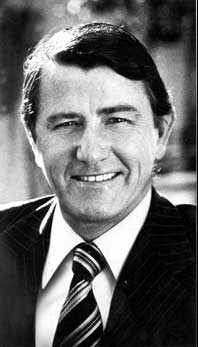
- Premier Neville Wran
- Date formed: 6 February 1986
- Date dissolved: 4 July 1986

People and organisations
- Monarch: Queen Elizabeth II
- Governor: Sir James Rowland
- Premier: Neville Wran
- Deputy Premier: Ron Mulock
- No. of ministers: 20
- Member party: Labor
- Opposition parties: Liberal National coalition
- Opposition leader: Nick Greiner

History
- Predecessor: Seventh Wran ministry
- Successor: Unsworth ministry

The Wran ministry (1986) or Eighth Wran ministry was the 78th ministry of the New South Wales Government, and was led by the 35th Premier of New South Wales, Neville Wran, representing the Labor Party. It was the eighth of eight consecutive and final occasions when Wran was Premier.

== Background ==
Wran had been elected to the Legislative Council of New South Wales by a joint sitting of the New South Wales Parliament on 12 March 1970. He was Leader of the Opposition in the Legislative Council from 22 February 1972. He resigned from the council on 19 October 1973 to switch to the Legislative Assembly, successfully contesting the election for Bass Hill, which he would hold until his retirement in 1986. Wran successfully challenged Pat Hills to become Leader of Labor Party and Leader of the Opposition from 3 December 1973 and became Premier following a narrow one seat victory at the 1976 election.

Labor retained government at the 1984 election, despite a 6.95% swing against Labor, losing 11 seats, but retaining a majority of 8 seats in the Legislative Assembly and a single seat majority in the Legislative Council. (Note: Labour retained 24 seats in the Legislative Council however the council had expanded from 44 to 45 seats due to the final step in the transition to a fully directly elected body.)

== Composition of ministry ==
The ministry covers the period from 6 February 1986 when Wran reconfigured his ministry, until 4 July 1986 when Wran resigned from the ministry and from Parliament. Barrie Unsworth was elected by Labor caucus as the Labor Leader, accepted commission as Premier and the Unsworth ministry was formed.

Portfolio	Minister	Party	Term commence	Term end	Term of office
Premier; Minister for the Arts; Minister for Ethnic Affairs	Neville Wran (Note: Retained portfolios from the seventh Wran ministry.)	Labor	6 February 1986	4 July 1986	148 days
Deputy Premier; Minister for Transport	Ron Mulock	Labor	6 February 1986	4 July 1986	148 days
Minister for Housing	Frank Walker	Labor	6 February 1986	4 July 1986	148 days
Minister for Public Works and Ports; Minister for Roads	Laurie Brereton	Labor	6 February 1986	4 July 1986	148 days
Minister for Industrial Relations	Pat Hills	Labor	6 February 1986	4 July 1986	148 days
Minister for Youth and Community Services; Minister for Aboriginal Affairs; Minister Assisting the Premier	Peter Anderson	Labor	6 February 1986	4 July 1986	148 days
Treasurer	Ken Booth	Labor	6 February 1986	4 July 1986	148 days
Attorney General; Minister for Co-operative Societies	Terry Sheahan	Labor	6 February 1986	4 July 1986	148 days
Minister for Health; Vice-President of the Executive Council; Leader of the Government in Legislative Council	Barrie Unsworth, MLC	Labor	6 February 1986	4 July 1986	148 days
Minister for Agriculture and Fisheries	Jack Hallam, MLC	Labor	6 February 1986	4 July 1986	148 days
Minister for Education	Rodney Cavalier	Labor	6 February 1986	4 July 1986	148 days
Minister for Industry and Small Business; Minister for Energy and Technology	Peter Cox	Labor	6 February 1986	4 July 1986	148 days
Minister for Sport and Recreation; Minister for Tourism	Michael Cleary	Labor	6 February 1986	4 July 1986	148 days
Minister for Police and Emergency Services	George Paciullo	Labor	6 February 1986	4 July 1986	148 days
Minister for Local Government	Janice Crosio	Labor	6 February 1986	4 July 1986	148 days
Minister for Employment; Minister for Finance	Bob Debus	Labor	6 February 1986	4 July 1986	148 days
Minister for Corrective Services	John Akister	Labor	6 February 1986	4 July 1986	148 days
Minister for Planning and Environment; Minister for Consumer Affairs	Bob Carr	Labor	6 February 1986	4 July 1986	148 days
Minister for Natural Resources	John Aquilina	Labor	6 February 1986	4 July 1986	148 days
Minister for Mineral Resources	Ken Gabb	Labor	6 February 1986	4 July 1986	148 days

Ministers are members of the Legislative Assembly unless otherwise noted.

== See also ==
- Members of the New South Wales Legislative Assembly, 1984–1988
- Members of the New South Wales Legislative Council, 1984–1988

== Notes ==
Preceded by Seventh Wran ministry (1984–1986)	Eighth Wran ministry 1986	Succeeded by Unsworth ministry
