= Wran ministry (1984–1986) =

77th New South Wales government ministry, led by Neville Wran

Seventh Wran ministry
- 77th Cabinet of Government of New South Wales

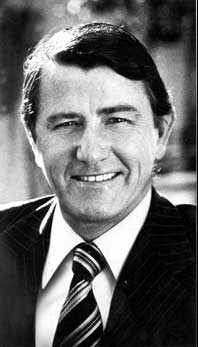
- Premier Neville Wran
- Date formed: 5 April 1984
- Date dissolved: 6 February 1986

People and organisations
- Monarch: Queen Elizabeth II
- Governor: Sir James Rowland
- Premier: Neville Wran
- Deputy Premier: Ron Mulock
- No. of ministers: 20
- Member party: Labor
- Opposition parties: Liberal National coalition
- Opposition leader: Nick Greiner

History
- Predecessor: Sixth Wran ministry
- Successor: Eighth Wran ministry

The Wran ministry (1984–1986) or Seventh Wran ministry was the 77th ministry of the New South Wales Government, and was led by the 35th Premier of New South Wales, Neville Wran, representing the Labor Party. It was the seventh of eight consecutive occasions when Wran was Premier.

== Background ==
Wran had been elected to the Legislative Council of New South Wales by a joint sitting of the New South Wales Parliament on 12 March 1970. He was Leader of the Opposition in the Legislative Council from 22 February 1972. He resigned from the council on 19 October 1973 to switch to the Legislative Assembly, successfully contesting the election for Bass Hill, which he would hold until his retirement in 1986. Wran successfully challenged Pat Hills to become Leader of Labor Party and Leader of the Opposition from 3 December 1973 and became Premier following a narrow one seat victory at the 1976 election.

Labor retained government at the 1984 election, despite a 6.95% swing against Labor, losing 11 seats, but retaining a majority of 8 seats in the Legislative Assembly and a single seat majority in the Legislative Council. (Note: Labour retained 24 seats in the Legislative Council however the council had expanded from 44 to 45 seats due to the final step in the transition to a fully directly elected body.)

== Composition of ministry ==
The ministry covers the period from 5 April 1984 the Wran–led Labor Party was re-elected at the 1984 election. There were four minor rearrangements of the ministry, commencing in November 1984 with the death of Paul Landa, (Note: Paul Landa died in November 1984, with Wran initially taking on his portfolio of Attorney General.) and a second rearrangement in December. (Note: Terry Sheahan was appointed Attorney General in December and Bob Carr was promoted to the ministry to replace Sheehan in the portfolio of Planning and Environment.) The third rearrangement in February 1985 saw the creation of a new portfolio of Ethnic Affairs. (Note: A new portfolio of Ethnic Affairs was created in February 1985 and Wran took on the additional responsibilities. Peter Anderson gained an additional role of assisting the Premier.) The fourth minor rearrangement was caused by the retirement of Eric Bedford and Kevin Stewart in December 1985. (Note: Eric Bedford and Kevin Stewart retired in December 1985 with Wran taking on Bedford's portfolios of Industry and Decentralisation and Small Business and Technology and Anderson taking on Stewart's portfolio of Local Government.) The ministry ended on 6 February 1986 when Wran reconfigured his ministry, and the eighth Wran ministry was formed.

| Portfolio | Minister | Party | Term commence | Term end | Term of office |
|---|---|---|---|---|---|
| Premier; Minister for the Arts | Neville Wran | Labor | 5 April 1984 | 6 February 1986 | 1 year, 307 days |
| Minister for Ethnic Affairs | Neville Wran | Labor | 6 February 1985 | 6 February 1986 | 334 days |
| Deputy Premier; Minister for Health | Ron Mulock (Note: Retained portfolios from the sixth Wran ministry.) | Labor | 5 April 1984 | 6 February 1986 | 1 year, 307 days |
| Minister for Youth and Community Services; Minister for Housing | Frank Walker | Labor | 5 April 1984 | 6 February 1986 | 1 year, 307 days |
| Minister for Public Works; Minister for Ports; Minister for Roads | Laurie Brereton | Labor | 5 April 1984 | 6 February 1986 | 1 year, 307 days |
| Attorney General | Paul Landa, MLC | Labor | 5 April 1984 | 4 November 1984 | 213 days |
| Attorney General | Neville Wran | Labor | 7 November 1984 | 12 December 1984 | 35 days |
| Attorney General | Terry Sheahan | Labor | 12 December 1984 | 6 February 1986 | 1 year, 56 days |
| Minister for Industrial Relations | Pat Hills | Labor | 5 April 1984 | 6 February 1986 | 1 year, 307 days |
| Minister for Police and Emergency Services | Peter Anderson | Labor | 5 April 1984 | 6 February 1986 | 1 year, 307 days |
| Minister Assisting the Premier | Peter Anderson | Labor | 6 February 1985 | 1 January 1986 | 329 days |
| Treasurer | Ken Booth | Labor | 5 April 1984 | 6 February 1986 | 1 year, 307 days |
| Minister for Planning and Environment | Terry Sheahan | Labor | 5 April 1984 | 12 December 1984 | 251 days |
| Minister for Planning and Environment | Bob Carr | Labor | 12 December 1984 | 6 February 1986 | 1 year, 56 days |
| Minister for Transport; Vice-President of the Executive Council; Leader of the Government in Legislative Council | Barrie Unsworth, MLC | Labor | 5 April 1984 | 6 February 1986 | 1 year, 307 days |
| Minister for Agriculture and Fisheries | Jack Hallam, MLC | Labor | 5 April 1984 | 6 February 1986 | 1 year, 307 days |
| Minister for Education | Rodney Cavalier | Labor | 5 April 1984 | 6 February 1986 | 1 year, 307 days |
| Minister for Mineral Resources and Energy | Peter Cox | Labor | 5 April 1984 | 6 February 1986 | 1 year, 307 days |
| Minister for Local Government | Kevin Stewart | Labor | 5 April 1984 | 31 December 1985 | 1 year, 270 days |
| Minister for Local Government | Peter Anderson | Labor | 1 January 1986 | 6 February 1986 | 36 days |
| Minister for Industry and Decentralisation; Minister for Small Business and Technology | Eric Bedford | Labor | 5 April 1984 | 31 December 1985 | 1 year, 270 days |
| Minister for Industry and Decentralisation; Minister for Small Business and Technology | Neville Wran | Labor | 1 January 1986 | 6 February 1986 | 36 days |
| Minister for Sport and Recreation; Minister for Tourism | Michael Cleary | Labor | 5 April 1984 | 6 February 1986 | 1 year, 307 days |
| Minister for Consumer Affairs; Minister for Aboriginal Affairs | George Paciullo | Labor | 5 April 1984 | 6 February 1986 | 1 year, 307 days |
| Minister for Natural Resources | Janice Crosio | Labor | 5 April 1984 | 6 February 1986 | 1 year, 307 days |
| Minister for Employment; Minister for Finance | Bob Debus | Labor | 5 April 1984 | 6 February 1986 | 1 year, 307 days |
| Minister for Corrective Services | John Akister | Labor | 5 April 1984 | 6 February 1986 | 1 year, 307 days |

Ministers are members of the Legislative Assembly unless otherwise noted.

== See also ==
- Members of the New South Wales Legislative Assembly, 1984–1988
- Members of the New South Wales Legislative Council, 1984–1988

== Notes ==
| Preceded by Sixth Wran ministry (1984) | Seventh Wran ministry 1984–1986 | Succeeded by Eighth Wran ministry (1986) |
