= Unsworth ministry =

79th New South Wales government ministry, led by Barrie Unsworth

- 79th Cabinet of Government of New South Wales

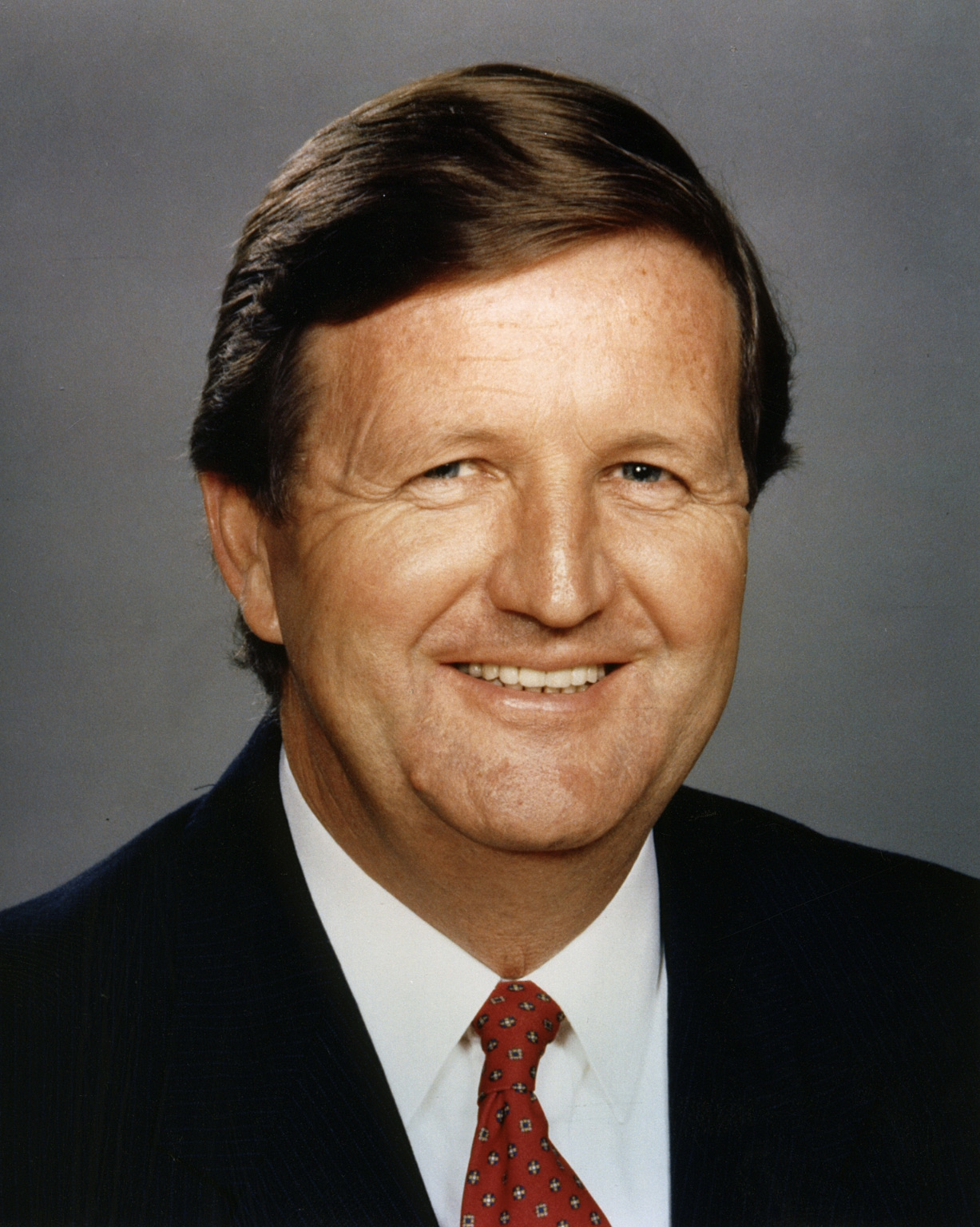
- Premier Barrie Unsworth
- Date formed: 4 July 1986
- Date dissolved: 21 March 1988

People and organisations
- Monarch: Queen Elizabeth II
- Governor: Sir James Rowland
- Premier: Barrie Unsworth
- Deputy Premier: Ron Mulock
- No. of ministers: 20
- Member party: Labor
- Status in legislature: Majority Labor Government
- Opposition parties: Liberal–National coalition
- Opposition leader: Nick Greiner

History
- Outgoing election: 1988 New South Wales state election
- Predecessor: Eighth Wran ministry
- Successor: First Greiner–Murray ministry

The Unsworth ministry was the 79th ministry of the New South Wales Government, and was led by the 36th Premier of New South Wales, Barrie Unsworth, representing the Labor Party.

After the surprise announcement in June 1986 that Neville Wran MP would retire as Premier, NSW Labor Leader, and from Parliament with effect from 4 July 1986, Unsworth, then a Member of the New South Wales Legislative Council, was elected as the leader of the NSW Labor Party and thus became Premier. However, by parliamentary convention, Premiers are members of the Legislative Assembly. In order for Unsworth to move from the Legislative Council to the Legislative Assembly, Brian Bannon, the member for Rockdale, resigned to accept a role as Chairman of the Homebush States Sport Centre Trust, and Unsworth contested the resulting by-election held on 2 August 1986. He narrowly won the seat, with a 17.1% decline in the primary vote and independent preferences giving him a margin of just 54 votes. A by-election for Wran's safe Labor seat of Bass Hill was even worse, with a 22.2 per cent decline in the primary vote delivering a 103–vote victory to the Liberal candidate.

The ministry covers the period from 4 July 1986 when Unsworth was elected by Labor caucus as the NSW Labor Leader until 21 March 1988 when Labor suffered a landslide defeat at the state election by the Liberal–National coalition, led by Nick Greiner and Wal Murray. Unsworth did not contest the 1991 election.

== Composition of ministry ==
Fifteen of the twenty ministers retained some or all of their portfolios from the eighth Wran ministry. (Note: Retained portfolios from the eighth Wran ministry.) There were two minor rearrangements of the ministry, in November 1986 with a new portfolio of Forests (Note: In November 1986 Jack Hallam was appointed to the new portfolio of Forests.) and in November 1987, when Laurie Brereton resigned from the ministry, triggering a reshuffle. (Note: Laurie Brereton resigned in November 1987 and Peter Cox replaced him as Minister for Public Works. Brereton's portfolio of Roads was abolished.) (Note: Peter Cox's portfolios were abolished, with Ken Gabb appointed as Minister for Minerals and Energy and Deirdre Grusovin becoming Minister for Small Business. Grusovin was also appointed Assistant Minister for Health.) (Note: Ron Mulock and Terry Sheahan swapped portfolios, with Mulock becoming Attorney General and Sheahan becoming Minister for Transport. Janice Crosio was also appointed Assistant Minister for Transport.)

Portfolio	Minister	Party	Term commence	Term end	Term of office
Premier	Barrie Unsworth	Labor	4 July 1986	21 March 1988	1 year, 261 days
Minister for State Development	Barrie Unsworth	Labor	4 July 1986	21 March 1988	1 year, 261 days
Minister for Ethnic Affairs	Barrie Unsworth	Labor	4 July 1986	21 March 1988	1 year, 261 days
Deputy Premier	Ron Mulock	Labor	4 July 1986	21 March 1988	1 year, 261 days
Minister for Transport	Ron Mulock	Labor	4 July 1986	26 November 1987	1 year, 145 days
Minister for Transport	Terry Sheahan	Labor	26 November 1987	21 March 1988	116 days
Attorney General	Terry Sheahan	Labor	4 July 1986	26 November 1987	1 year, 145 days
Attorney General	Ron Mulock	Labor	26 November 1987	21 March 1988	116 days
Minister Assisting the Premier	Terry Sheahan	Labor	4 July 1986	26 November 1987	1 year, 145 days
Minister for Housing	Frank Walker	Labor	4 July 1986	21 March 1988	1 year, 261 days
Minister for the Arts	Frank Walker	Labor	4 July 1986	21 March 1988	1 year, 261 days
Minister for Public Works and Ports	Laurie Brereton	Labor	4 July 1986	26 November 1987	1 year, 145 days
Minister for Roads	Laurie Brereton	Labor	4 July 1986	26 November 1987	1 year, 145 days
Minister for Public Works	Peter Cox	Labor	26 November 1987	21 March 1988	116 days
Minister Assisting the Premier	Peter Cox	Labor	26 November 1987	21 March 1988	116 days
Minister for Industrial Relations	Pat Hills	Labor	4 July 1986	21 March 1988	1 year, 261 days
Minister for Employment	Pat Hills	Labor	4 July 1986	21 March 1988	1 year, 261 days
Minister for Health; Minister for the Drug Offensive	Peter Anderson	Labor	4 July 1986	21 March 1988	1 year, 261 days
Treasurer	Ken Booth	Labor	4 July 1986	21 March 1988	1 year, 261 days
Minister for Industry and Small Business	Peter Cox	Labor	4 July 1986	26 November 1987	1 year, 145 days
Minister for Energy and Technology	Peter Cox	Labor	4 July 1986	26 November 1987	1 year, 145 days
Minister for Agriculture	Jack Hallam, MLC	Labor	4 July 1986	21 March 1988	1 year, 261 days
Minister for Lands	Jack Hallam, MLC	Labor	4 July 1986	21 March 1988	1 year, 261 days
Vice-President of the Executive Council; Leader of the Government in Legislative Council	Jack Hallam, MLC	Labor	4 July 1986	21 March 1988	1 year, 261 days
Minister for Forests	Jack Hallam, MLC	Labor	5 November 1986	21 March 1988	1 year, 137 days
Minister for Education	Rodney Cavalier	Labor	4 July 1986	21 March 1988	1 year, 261 days
Minister for Sport and Recreation	Michael Cleary	Labor	4 July 1986	21 March 1988	1 year, 261 days
Minister for Racing	Michael Cleary	Labor	4 July 1986	21 March 1988	1 year, 261 days
Minister for Tourism	Michael Cleary	Labor	4 July 1986	21 March 1988	1 year, 261 days
Minister for Police and Emergency Services	George Paciullo	Labor	4 July 1986	21 March 1988	1 year, 261 days
Minister for Local Government	Janice Crosio	Labor	4 July 1986	21 March 1988	1 year, 261 days
Minister for Water Resources	Janice Crosio	Labor	4 July 1986	21 March 1988	1 year, 261 days
Minister for Finance	Bob Debus	Labor	4 July 1986	21 March 1988	1 year, 261 days
Minister for Co-operative Societies	Bob Debus	Labor	4 July 1986	21 March 1988	1 year, 261 days
Assistant Minister for Education	Bob Debus	Labor	4 July 1986	21 March 1988	1 year, 261 days
Minister for Corrective Services	John Akister	Labor	4 July 1986	21 March 1988	1 year, 261 days
Assistant Minister for Transport	John Akister	Labor	4 July 1986	21 March 1988	1 year, 261 days
Assistant Minister for Transport	Janice Crosio	Labor	26 November 1987	21 March 1988	116 days
Minister for Planning and Environment	Bob Carr	Labor	4 July 1986	21 March 1988	1 year, 261 days
Minister for Heritage	Bob Carr	Labor	4 July 1986	21 March 1988	1 year, 261 days
Minister for Youth and Community Services	John Aquilina	Labor	4 July 1986	21 March 1988	1 year, 261 days
Assistant Minister for Ethnic Affairs	John Aquilina	Labor	4 July 1986	21 March 1988	1 year, 261 days
Minister for Mineral Resources	Ken Gabb	Labor	4 July 1986	26 November 1987	1 year, 145 days
Minister for Minerals and Energy	Ken Gabb	Labor	26 November 1987	21 March 1988	116 days
Minister for Aboriginal Affairs	Ken Gabb	Labor	4 July 1986	21 March 1988	1 year, 261 days
Minister for Consumer Affairs	Deirdre Grusovin, MLC	Labor	4 July 1986	21 March 1988	1 year, 261 days
Minister for Small Business	Deirdre Grusovin, MLC	Labor	26 November 1987	21 March 1988	116 days
Assistant Minister for Health	Deirdre Grusovin, MLC	Labor	26 November 1987	21 March 1988	116 days

Ministers are members of the Legislative Assembly unless otherwise noted.

== See also ==
- Members of the New South Wales Legislative Assembly, 1984–1988
- Members of the New South Wales Legislative Council, 1984–1988

== Notes ==
Preceded by Eighth Wran ministry (1986)	Unsworth ministry 1986–1988	Succeeded by First Greiner–Murray ministry (1988–1991)
