= Minister for Small Business (New South Wales) =

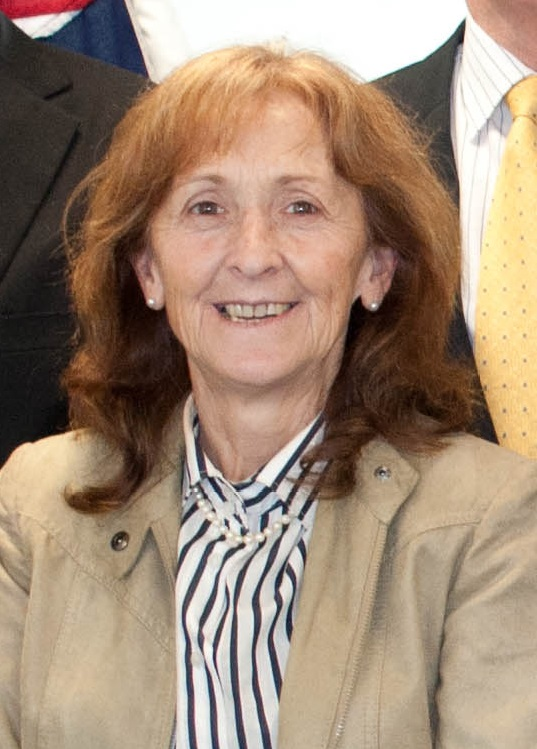
- Incumbent; Janelle Saffin since 17 March 2025
- Style: The Honourable
- Nominator: Premier of New South Wales
- Appointer: Governor of New South Wales
- Inaugural holder: George Paciullo (as the Minister for Small Business and Technology)
- Formation: 10 February 1984

The Minister for Small Business is a minister of the New South Wales Government within the Treasury and has responsibilities for matters relating to small business policy and regulation in New South Wales. The current Minister for Small Business, since 17 March 2025, is Janelle Saffin.

The minister supports the Minister for Finance, presently Courtney Houssos and the Treasurer, presently Daniel Mookhey. Ultimately the minister is responsible to the Parliament of New South Wales.

== Role and responsibilities ==
Small business was first represented at a portfolio level in the sixth Wran ministry, with the appointment of George Paciullo as the Minister for Small Business and Technology, with Paciullo also holding the portfolio of Industry and Decentralisation. The portfolio was responsible for promoting the well-being, growth and development of the small business sector in New South Wales through the Office of Small Business. In the eighth Wran ministry small business was combined with industry to form the portfolio of Industry and Small Business.

Small Business first became a separate portfolio in the Unsworth ministry, with the appointment of Deirdre Grusovin who also held the portfolio of Consumer Affairs. In addition to the Office of Small Business, the portfolio was responsible for Small Business Development Corporation which undertook research and investigated matters relating to the small business section of the economy and aimed at expanding the effectiveness of existing government assistance and advisory programs. The portfolio was replaced in the first Grieiner ministry by the portfolio of Business and Consumer Affairs.

== List of ministers ==
| Title | Minister | Party | Ministry | Term start | Term end | Time in office | Notes |
|---|---|---|---|---|---|---|---|
| Minister for Small Business and Technology | George Paciullo | Labor | Wran (6) | 10 February 1984 | 5 April 1984 | 55 days | |
| Minister for Small Business and Technology | Eric Bedford | Labor | Wran (7) | 5 April 1984 | 31 December 1985 | 1 year, 270 days | |
| Minister for Small Business and Technology | Neville Wran | Labor | Wran (7) | 1 January 1986 | 6 February 1986 | 36 days | |
| Minister for Industry and Small Business | Peter Cox | Labor | Wran (8); Unsworth | 6 February 1986 | 26 November 1987 | 1 year, 293 days | |
| Minister for Small Business | Deirdre Grusovin | Labor | Unsworth | 26 November 1987 | 21 March 1988 | 116 days | |
| Minister for Business and Consumer Affairs | Gerry Peacocke | National | Grieiner (1) | 25 March 1988 | 6 June 1991 | 3 years, 73 days | |
| Minister for Small Business | Ray Chappell | National | Fahey (3) | 26 May 1993 | 4 April 1995 | 1 year, 313 days | |
| Minister for Small Business and Regional Development | Carl Scully | Labor | Carr (1) | 4 April 1995 | 15 December 1995 | 255 days | |
| Minister for Small Business | Sandra Nori | Labor | Carr (3) | 8 April 1999 | 2 April 2003 | 3 years, 359 days | |
| Minister for Small Business | David Campbell | Labor | Carr (4); Iemma (1) | 2 April 2003 | 2 April 2007 | 4 years, 0 days | |
| Minister for Small Business | Joe Tripodi | Labor | Iemma (2) | 2 April 2007 | 5 September 2008 | 1 year, 156 days | |
| Minister for Small Business | Tony Stewart | Labor | Rees | 8 September 2008 | 11 November 2008 | 64 days | |
| Minister for Small Business | Jodi McKay | Labor | Rees | 11 November 2008 | 30 January 2009 | 80 days | |
| Minister for Small Business | Steve Whan | Labor | Rees | 30 January 2009 | 4 December 2009 | 308 days | |
| Minister for Small Business | Peter Primrose | Labor | Keneally | 4 December 2009 | 21 May 2010 | 168 days | |
| Minister for Small Business | Frank Terenzini | Labor | Keneally | 21 May 2010 | 28 March 2011 | 311 days | |
| Minister for Small Business | Katrina Hodgkinson | National | O'Farrell | 3 April 2011 | 17 April 2014 | 3 years, 14 days | |
| Minister for Small Business | Andrew Stoner | National | Baird (1) | 23 April 2014 | 17 October 2014 | 177 days | |
| Minister for Small Business | John Barilaro | National | Baird (1) (2); Berejiklian (1) | 17 October 2014 | 23 March 2019 | 4 years, 157 days | |
| Minister for Finance and Small Business | Damien Tudehope | Liberal | Berejiklian (2) | 2 April 2019 | 21 December 2021 | 2 years, 263 days | |
| Minister for Small Business | Eleni Petinos | Liberal | Perrottet (2) | 21 December 2021 | 3 August 2022 | 225 days | |
| Minister for Small Business | Victor Dominello | Liberal | Perrottet (2) | 3 August 2022 | 28 March 2023 | 237 days | |
| Minister for Small Business | Steve Kamper | Labor | Minns | 5 April 2023 | 17 March 2025 | 3 years, 227 days | |
| Minister for Small Business | Janelle Saffin | Labor | Minns | 17 March 2025 | incumbent | 1 year, 246 days | |

== See also ==
- List of New South Wales government agencies
