= Wran ministry =

Wran ministry may refer to several ministries of the Government of New South Wales led by Neville Wran:

- Wran ministry (1976–1978)
- Wran ministry (1978–1980)
- Wran ministry (1980–1981)
- Wran ministry (1981–1983)
- Wran ministry (1983–1984)
- Wran ministry (1984–1986)
