= Minister for Planning and Public Spaces =

Government minister in New South Wales, Australia

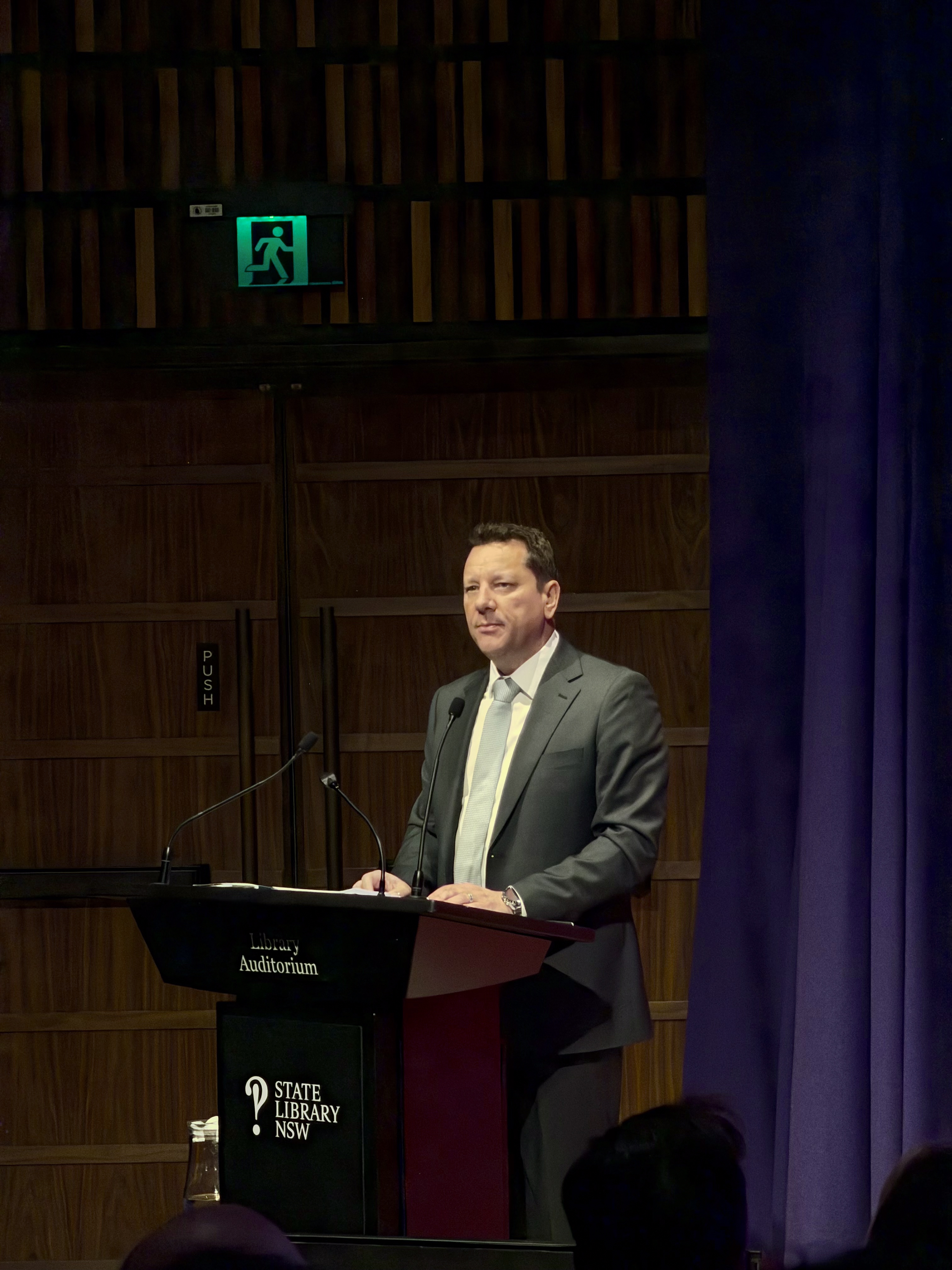
- Incumbent; Paul Scully since 5 April 2023
- Department of Planning, Housing and Infrastructure
- Style: The Honourable
- Appointer: Governor of New South Wales
- Inaugural holder: Sir John Fuller (as the Minister for Planning and Environment)
- Formation: 3 December 1973

The New South Wales Minister for Planning and Public Spaces is a minister in the Government of New South Wales with responsibility for regional and urban planning with the goal of facilitating sustainable growth and employment in New South Wales, Australia.

The minister administers the portfolio through the Department of Planning, Housing and Infrastructure, a department of the Government of New South Wales, and additional agencies.

The minister is supported in the administration of the Department by the following ministers:

- Minister for Lands and Property
- Minister for Local Government
- Minister for Housing
- Attorney General
- Minister for Western Sydney

Ultimately the ministers are responsible to the Parliament of New South Wales.

The Minister is also the consent authority for certain State significant development applications lodged under the Environmental Planning and Assessment Act 1979.

== List of ministers ==
The following individuals have been appointed as Minister for Planning and Public Spaces, or similar titles.

Ministerial title	Minister	Party	Ministry	Term start	Term end	Time in office	Notes
Minister for Planning and Environment	Sir John Fuller	Country	Askin (6)	3 December 1973	14 May 1976	2 years, 163 days	
Minister for Planning	Harry Jensen	Labor	Wran (1)	14 May 1976	9 August 1976	87 days	
Minister for Planning and Environment	Paul Landa	Labor	Wran (1) (2)	9 August 1976	29 February 1980	3 years, 204 days	
Minister for Planning and Environment	Eric Bedford	Labor	Wran (2) (3) (4) (5)	29 February 1980	10 February 1984	3 years, 347 days	
Minister for Planning and Environment	Terry Sheahan	Labor	Wran (6) (7)	10 February 1984	12 December 1984	306 days	
Minister for Planning and Environment	Bob Carr	Labor	Wran (7) (8); Unsworth	12 December 1984	21 March 1988	3 years, 100 days	
Minister for Planning	David Hay	Liberal	Greiner (1)	21 March 1988	6 June 1991	3 years, 77 days	
Minister for Planning	Robert Webster	National	Greiner (2); Fahey (1) (2) (3)	6 June 1991	4 April 1995	3 years, 302 days	
Minister for Urban Affairs and Planning	Craig Knowles	Labor	Carr (1) (2)	4 April 1995	8 April 1999	4 years, 4 days	
Minister for Urban Affairs and Planning	Andrew Refshauge	Labor	Carr (3)	8 April 1999	21 November 2001	3 years, 359 days	
Minister for Planning	Andrew Refshauge	Labor	Carr (3)	21 November 2001	2 April 2003	3 years, 359 days	
Minister for Infrastructure and Planning	Craig Knowles	Labor	Carr (4)	2 April 2003	3 August 2005	2 years, 123 days	
Minister for Planning	Frank Sartor	Labor	Iemma (1) (2)	3 August 2005	5 September 2008	3 years, 33 days	
Minister for Planning	Kristina Keneally	Labor	Rees	8 September 2008	4 December 2009	1 year, 87 days	
Minister for Planning	Tony Kelly	Labor	Keneally	4 December 2009	28 March 2011	1 year, 114 days	
Minister for Planning and Infrastructure	Brad Hazzard	Liberal	O'Farrell	3 April 2011	23 April 2014	3 years, 20 days	
Minister for Planning	Pru Goward	Liberal	Baird (1)	23 April 2014	2 April 2015	344 days	
Minister for Planning	Rob Stokes	Liberal	Baird (2)	2 April 2015	30 January 2017	1 year, 303 days	
Minister for Planning	Anthony Roberts	Liberal	Berejiklian (1)	30 January 2017	23 March 2019	2 years, 52 days	
Minister for Planning and Public Spaces	Rob Stokes	Liberal	Berejiklian (2); Perrottet (1)	2 April 2019	21 December 2021	2 years, 263 days	
Minister for Planning	Anthony Roberts	Liberal	Perrottet (2)	21 December 2021	28 March 2023	1 year, 97 days	
Treasurer	Daniel Mookhey	Labor	Minns	28 March 2023	5 April 2023	8 days	
Minister for Planning and Public Spaces	Paul Scully	Labor	Minns	5 April 2023	incumbent	3 years, 227 days	

== Former ministerial titles ==
=== Assistant Ministers for Planning ===
The following individuals have been appointed as Assistant Minister for Planning, or similar titles.

Ministerial title	Minister	Party	Ministry	Term start	Term end	Time in office	Notes
Minister Assisting the Minister for Infrastructure and Planning (Planning Administration)	Diane Beamer	Labor	Carr (4)	2 April 2003	3 August 2005	2 years, 123 days	
Minister Assisting the Minister for Planning	Barbara Perry	Labor	Keneally	8 December 2009	28 March 2011	1 year, 110 days	
Minister for the State Plan	Linda Burney	Labor	Keneally	8 December 2009	28 March 2011	1 year, 110 days	
Assistant Minister for Planning	Rob Stokes	Liberal	Baird (1)	23 April 2014	2 April 2015	344 days	
Assistant Minister for Planning	Mark Speakman	Liberal	Baird (2); Berejiklian (1)	2 April 2015	30 January 2017	1 year, 303 days	

=== Cities ===
The New South Wales Minister for Cities was a minister in the Government of New South Wales with responsibility for dividing Sydney into three separate cities, and interconnecting them with the cities of Central Coast, Newcastle and Wollongong to form connections between the six cities in "north-south" and "east-west" axes. The minister's responsibilities were held jointly with the portfolios of Planning and Active Transport. These included Callan Park, Centennial Park, Moore Park, Newcastle National Park, including the Number 1 Sports Ground, Parramatta Park, Old Government House, Royal Botanic Gardens, The Domain, Sydney Olympic Park and Western Sydney Parklands.

Ministerial title	Minister	Party	Ministry	Term start	Term end	Time in office	Notes
Minister for Cities	Rob Stokes	Liberal	Perrottet (2)	21 December 2021	28 March 2023	1 year, 97 days	

== See also ==
- List of New South Wales government agencies
