= Courtney Houssos =

Australian politician

The Honourable Courtney Houssos MLC

Minister for Finance
- Incumbent
- Assumed office 5 April 2023
- Premier: Chris Minns
- Preceded by: Dominic Perrottet

Minister for Natural Resources
- Incumbent
- Assumed office 5 April 2023
- Premier: Chris Minns
- Preceded by: Kevin Anderson (as Minister for Lands and Water)

Minister for Domestic Manufacturing and Government Procurement
- Incumbent
- Assumed office 28 September 2023
- Premier: Chris Minns
- Preceded by: new portfolio

Member of the New South Wales Legislative Council
- Incumbent
- Assumed office 28 March 2015
- Preceded by: Amanda Fazio

Personal details
- Born: Courtney Roche; 1981 or 1982 (age 43–44) Forster, New South Wales, Australia
- Party: Labor Party
- Spouse: George Houssos
- Children: One daughter and one son
- Education: Forster High School
- Alma mater: University of New South Wales

Courtney Houssos (born 1981 or 1982) is an Australian politician. She has been a Labor member of the New South Wales Legislative Council since the 2015 state election. She is currently the Minister for Finance, Domestic Manufacturing and Government Procurement and Natural Resources in the Minns government.

Houssos was born Courtney Roche in Forster, New South Wales. She was educated at Forster High School. She later studied for a Bachelor of Arts in international relations at the University of New South Wales, where she met her future husband, George Houssos. At university, she entered student politics as a member of the student representative council protesting against university fee reform, and continued in politics as the first female Labor Party organiser for country New South Wales.

In 2014, the New South Wales Labor Party removed Amanda Fazio from the party's upper house ticket at the 2015 state election, and Houssos was preselected to replace her. She was elected as the youngest Labor member of the Legislative Council. In 2021, she was appointed as Shadow Minister for Better Regulation and Innovation in the NSW Minns Shadow Cabinet.

In June 2023, The Daily Telegraph raised concerns over claims of a conflict of interest for Houssos involving her husband, George Houssos, who is employed as a lobbyist for the insurance industry. Houssos and Premier Chris Minns denied that there was a conflict of interest. She was appointed as Minister for Domestic Manufacturing and Government Procurement in September 2023.

Political offices
Preceded by Dominic Perrottet	Minister for Finance; 2023–present	Incumbent
Preceded by Kevin Anderson (as Minister for Lands and Water)	Minister for Natural Resources; 2023–present	Incumbent
New title	Minister for Domestic Manufacturing and Government Procurement; 2023–present	Incumbent
