= Minister for Police and Counter-terrorism =

Australian politician

- Incumbent; Yasmin Catley since 5 April 2023
- Department of Communities and Justice
- Style: The Honourable
- Appointer: Governor of New South Wales
- Inaugural holder: John Waddy
- Formation: 3 January 1975

The New South Wales Minister for Police and Counter-terrorism is a minister in the Government of New South Wales who has responsibilities which include the conduct and regulation of all police and services agencies and personnel and also deals with operational and event planning issues, and fire and rescue services in New South Wales, Australia. The Minister also serves as the Vice-Patron of NSW Police Legacy.

The current Minister for Police and Counter-terrorism is Yasmin Catley, since 5 April 2023.

On the 21 December 2021 upon the appointment of Steph Cooke as the Minister for Emergency Services and Resilience the portfolio for the Minister of Police and Emergency Services was split.

The ministers administer the portfolio through the Communities and Justice cluster, in particular through the Department of Communities and Justice, a department of the Government of New South Wales, and additional agencies including the New South Wales Crime Commission, the New South Wales Police Force and the Police Integrity Commission

Ultimately the ministers are responsible to Parliament of New South Wales.

== List of ministers ==
=== Police ===
The following individuals have served as Ministers for Police, or any precedent titles:

Title	Minister	Party	Ministry	Term start	Term end	Time in office	Notes
Minister for Police	John Waddy	Liberal	Lewis (2)	3 January 1975	23 January 1976	1 year, 20 days	
Minister for Police	Bill Crabtree	Labor	Wran (3)	29 February 1980	2 October 1981	1 year, 216 days	
Minister for Police	Peter Anderson	Labor	Wran (4)	2 October 1981	26 May 1982	4 years, 127 days	
Minister for Police and Emergency Services	Peter Anderson	Labor	Wran (4) (5) (6)	26 May 1982	6 February 1986	4 years, 127 days	
Minister for Police and Emergency Services	George Paciullo	Labor	Wran (7)Unsworth	6 February 1986	21 March 1988	2 years, 44 days	
Minister for Police and Emergency Services	Ted Pickering	Liberal	Greiner (1) (2); Fahey (1) (2)	25 March 1988	23 September 1992	4 years, 182 days	
Minister for Police	Terry Griffiths	Liberal	Fahey (2) (3)	23 September 1992	27 June 1994	1 year, 277 days	
Minister for Police	Garry West	National	Fahey (3)	27 June 1994	4 April 1995	281 days	
Minister for Police	Paul Whelan	Labor	Carr (1) (2) (3)	4 April 1995	21 November 2001	6 years, 231 days	
Minister for Police	Michael Costa	Labor	Carr (3)	21 November 2001	2 April 2003	1 year, 132 days	
Minister for Police	John Watkins	Labor	Carr (4)	2 April 2003	21 January 2005	1 year, 294 days	
Minister for Police	Carl Scully	Labor	Carr (4); Iemma (1)	21 January 2005	26 October 2006	1 year, 278 days	
Minister for Police	John Watkins	Labor	Iemma (1)	26 October 2006	2 April 2007	158 days	
Minister for Police	David Campbell	Labor	Iemma (2)	2 April 2007	5 September 2008	1 year, 156 days	
Minister for Police	Matt Brown	Labor	Rees	8 September 2008	11 September 2008	3 days	
Minister for Police	Tony Kelly	Labor	Rees	11 September 2008	14 September 2009	1 year, 3 days	
Minister for Police	Michael Daley	Labor	Rees; Keneally	14 September 2009	28 March 2011	1 year, 195 days	
Minister for Police and Emergency Services	Mike Gallacher	Liberal	O'Farrell; Baird (1)	4 April 2011	2 May 2014	3 years, 28 days	
Minister for Police and Emergency Services	Stuart Ayres	Liberal	Baird (1)	6 May 2014	1 April 2015	330 days	
Minister for Police and Justice	Troy Grant	National	Baird (2)	2 April 2015	30 January 2017	1 year, 303 days	
Minister for Police	Troy Grant	National	Berejiklian (1)	30 January 2017	23 March 2019	1 year, 303 days	
Minister for Police and Emergency Services	David Elliott	Liberal	Berejiklian (2); Perrottet (1)	2 April 2019	21 December 2021	2 years, 263 days	
Minister for Police	Paul Toole	National	Perrottet (2)	21 December 2021	28 March 2023	1 year, 97 days	
Minister for Mental Health	Ryan Park	Labor	Minns	28 March 2023	5 April 2023	8 days	
Minister for Police and Counter-terrorism	Yasmin Catley	Labor	Minns	5 April 2023	incumbent	3 years, 227 days	

=== Counter-terrorism ===
Title	Minister	Party	Term start	Term end	Time in office	Notes
Minister for Counter Terrorism; Minister for Corrections	David Elliott	Liberal	30 January 2017	2 April 2019	2 years, 62 days	
Minister for Counter Terrorism and Corrections	Anthony Roberts	Liberal	2 April 2019	21 December 2021	2 years, 263 days	
Minister for Mental Health	Ryan Park	Labor	28 March 2023	5 April 2023	8 days	
Minister for Police and Counter-terrorism	Yasmin Catley	Labor	5 April 2023	incumbent	3 years, 227 days	

== See also ==
- List of New South Wales government agencies
