= Minister for Youth Justice (New South Wales) =

Government minister in New South Wales, Australia

Minister of Youth Justice of New South Wales

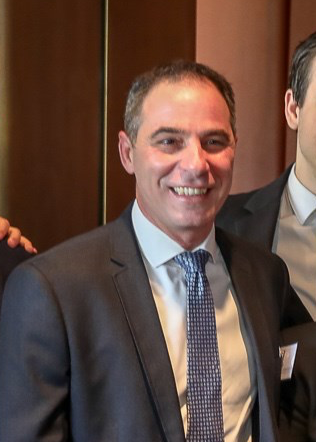
- Incumbent; Jihad Dib since 5 April 2023
- Style: The Honourable
- Nominator: Premier of New South Wales
- Appointer: Governor of New South Wales
- Precursor: Minister of Justice; Minister for Juvenile Justice
- Formation: 8 April 1999
- First holder: Carmel Tebbutt
- Website: www.nsw.gov.au/legal-and-justice/youth-justice

The Minister for Youth Justice, formerly Minister for Juvenile Justice, is a ministry in the administration of New South Wales. The position supports the Attorney General and has occasionally been held concurrently with that office.

== Role and responsibilities ==
Prior to 1873 there were two legal officers in the ministry, Attorney General and the Solicitor General, however there was only one portfolio, the law officers of the crown. The Attorney was the senior law officer and responsible for the work of the Solicitor-General, Crown Solicitors, parliamentary draftsmen, the administration of the courts and supporting officers such as the Sheriff and Coroner. The Solicitor General represented the crown in court, (Note: For example the Solicitor General prosecuted the bushrangers the Clarke brothers in 1867, and appeared with the Attorney General in a motion before the full court for a new trial.) provided legal advice to the government, drafted bills and helped to prepare civil and criminal litigation.

When the Attorney General Edward Butler resigned, the Solicitor General Joseph Innes was promoted to first law officer. Innes was not however replaced as Solicitor General. Instead Parkes created the new ministry of justice and public instruction. The minister assumed responsibility for the administration of the courts, sheriff and coroner, as well as the Council of Education, orphan schools, the public library, Australian Museum and observatory. The first minister George Allen, was a solicitor who had a particular interest in education, having previously served as a commissioner of National education, supported the incorporation of the Sydney Grammar School and having a seat on the Council of Education immediately prior to his appointment as responsible minister.

Prisons remained the responsibility of the Colonial Secretary. In 1880 the ministry was split into the Minister of Justice and the Minister of Public Instruction.

Prior to 1880 the Minister of Justice and Public Instruction was responsible for the administration of the courts, sheriff and coroner, as well as the Council of Education, orphan schools, the public library, Australian Museum and observatory. In 1880 the ministry was split into the Minister of Justice and the Minister of Public Instruction following the passage of the Public Instruction Act of 1880 which required a minister to assume the responsibilities of the former Council of Education.

The minister also assumed responsibility for prisons which had previously been the responsibility of the Colonial Secretary, however the Colonial Secretary retained responsibility for police. The Minister for Justice was briefly responsible for Police from 1974 until 1975. In 1978 the minister ceased to be responsible for prisons which became the responsibility of the Minister for Corrective Services.

The ministry was held by the Attorney General in the third to sixth Wran ministries and was formally subsumed into the responsibilities of the Attorney General in the seventh Wran ministry in 1984. The portfolio was re-created in 1991, known for three weeks as the Minister for Courts Administration and Corrective Services, before returning to the name Minister for Justice. The ministry was abolished in the First Carr ministry in 1995, with justice returning to be the responsibility of the Attorney General, and juvenile justice being the responsibility of a separate minister. It was re-created in the Fourth Carr ministry in 2003 and was abolished in the Rees ministry in 2011. The portfolio was re-created in the O'Farrell ministry in 2011, combined with the portfolio of police in 2015 and was abolished in the first Berejiklian ministry in 2017, replaced by the Minister for Counter Terrorism.

== Ministers ==
Title	Minister	Party	Term start	Term end	Time in office	Notes
Minister for Juvenile Justice	Carmel Tebbutt	Labor	8 April 1999	2 April 2003	3 years, 359 days	
Minister for Juvenile Justice	Diane Beamer	Labor	2 April 2003	3 August 2005	2 years, 123 days	
Minister for Juvenile Justice	Tony Kelly	Labor	3 August 2005	2 April 2007	1 year, 242 days	
Minister for Juvenile Justice	John Hatzistergos	Labor	2 April 2007	11 April 2007	9 days	
Minister for Juvenile Justice	Barbara Perry	Labor	11 April 2007	5 September 2008	1 year, 147 days	
Minister for Juvenile Justice	Graham West	Labor	8 September 2008	5 June 2010	1 year, 270 days	
Minister for Juvenile Justice	Barbara Perry	Labor	5 June 2010	28 March 2011	296 days	
Minister for Mental Health	Ryan Park	Labor	28 March 2023	5 April 2023	8 days	
Minister for Youth Justice	Jihad Dib	Labor	5 April 2023	present	3 years, 155 days	

== Former ministerial titles ==
=== Justice ===
Minister of Justice and Public Instruction of New South Wales
- Appointer: Governor of New South Wales
- Formation: 9 December 1873
- First holder: George Allen
- Final holder: Francis Suttor
- Abolished: 30 April 1880
- Succession: Minister of Justice; Minister of Public Instruction

Minister for Justice of New South Wales

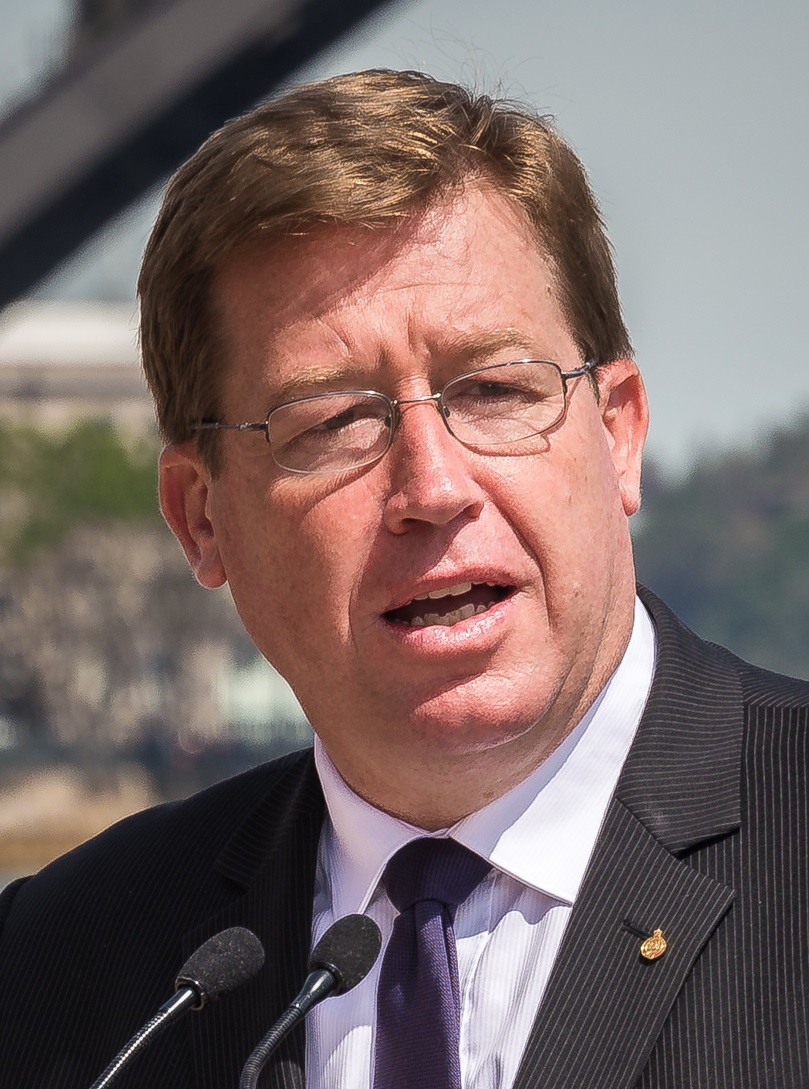
- Final minister Troy Grant
- Appointer: Governor of New South Wales
- Precursor: Minister of Justice and Public Instruction
- Formation: 1 May 1880
- First holder: Francis Suttor
- Final holder: Troy Grant
- Abolished: 30 January 2017
- Succession: Minister for Counter Terrorism

Title	Minister	Party	Term start	Term end	Time in office	Notes
Minister of Justice and Public Instruction	George Allen MLA	None	9 December 1873	8 February 1875	1 year, 61 days	
Minister of Justice and Public Instruction	Joseph Docker MLC	None	9 February 1875	21 March 1877	2 years, 40 days	
Minister of Justice and Public Instruction	Francis Suttor MLA	None	22 March 1877	16 August 1877	147 days	
Minister of Justice and Public Instruction	John Lackey MLA	None	17 August 1877	17 December 1877	122 days	
Minister of Justice and Public Instruction	Joseph Leary MLA	None	18 December 1877	20 December 1878	1 year, 2 days	
Minister of Justice and Public Instruction	Francis Suttor	None	21 December 1878	30 April 1880	1 year, 131 days	
Minister of Justice	Francis Suttor	None	1 May 1880	10 August 1880	101 days	
Minister of Justice	Sir Joseph Innes	None	11 August 1880	13 October 1881	63 days	
Minister of Justice	William Foster	None	14 October 1881	4 January 1883	1 year, 82 days	
Minister of Justice	Henry Cohen	None	5 January 1883	6 October 1885	2 years, 274 days	
Minister of Justice	James Farnell	None	7 October 1885	9 October 1885	2 days	
Minister of Justice	Thomas Slattery	None	2 November 1885	21 December 1885	49 days	
Minister of Justice	Louis Heydon	None	22 December 1885	4 February 1886	44 days	
Minister of Justice	James Garvan	Protectionist	26 February 1886	19 January 1887	327 days	
Minister of Justice	William Clarke	Free Trade	20 January 1887	16 January 1889	1 year, 362 days	
Minister of Justice	Thomas Slattery	Protectionist	17 January 1889	7 March 1889	49 days	
Minister of Justice	Albert Gould	Free Trade	8 March 1889	22 October 1891	2 years, 228 days	
Minister of Justice	Richard O'Connor	Protectionist	23 October 1891	14 December 1893	2 years, 52 days	
Minister of Justice	Thomas Slattery	Protectionist	15 December 1893	2 August 1894	230 days	
Minister of Justice	Albert Gould	Free Trade	3 August 1894	15 August 1898	4 years, 12 days	
Minister of Justice	Charles Lee	Free Trade	17 August 1898	3 July 1899	320 days	
Minister of Justice	John Hughes	Free Trade	3 July 1899	13 September 1899	72 days	
Minister of Justice	William Wood	Protectionist	14 September 1899	9 April 1901	1 year, 207 days	
Minister of Justice	Robert Fitzgerald	Progressive	11 April 1901	16 July 1901	96 days	
Minister of Justice	Bernhard Wise (Note: Bernhard Wise was the Attorney General and took on the additional responsibilities following the electoral defeat of Robert Fitzgerald.)	Progressive	22 July 1901	14 June 1904	2 years, 328 days	
Minister of Justice	Thomas Waddell	Progressive	15 June 1904	29 August 1904	75 days	
Minister of Justice	Charles Wade	Liberal Reform	29 August 1904	20 December 1909	5 years, 113 days	
Minister of Justice	John Garland	Liberal Reform	21 December 1909	20 October 1910	303 days	
Minister of Justice	William Holman	Labor	21 October 1910	1 April 1912	1 year, 163 days	
Minister of Justice	David Hall	Labor	2 April 1912	15 November 1916	4 years, 227 days	
Minister of Justice	John Garland	Nationalist	15 November 1916	23 July 1919	2 years, 250 days	
Minister of Justice	Jack FitzGerald	Nationalist	23 July 1919	12 April 1920	264 days	
Minister of Justice	Edward McTiernan	Labor	12 April 1920	21 December 1920	253 days	
Minister of Justice	William McKell (Note: William McKell was appointed as a Minister without Portfolio to be Assistant Minister of Justice from 12 April 1920, and appointed Minister on 22 December 1920.)	Labor	22 December 1920	10 October 1921	292 days	
Minister of Justice	Thomas Bavin	Nationalist	20 December 1921	20 December 1921	7 hours	
Minister of Justice	William McKell	Labor	20 December 1921	13 April 1922	114 days	
Minister of Justice	Thomas Ley	Nationalist	13 April 1922	17 June 1925	3 years, 65 days	
Minister of Justice	William McKell	Labor	17 June 1925	7 June 1927	1 year, 355 days	
Minister of Justice	Andrew Lysaght	Labor	8 June 1927	18 October 1927	132 days	
Minister for Justice	John Lee	Nationalist	18 October 1927	3 November 1930	3 years, 16 days	
Minister for Justice	Joseph Lamaro	Labor	4 November 1930	17 June 1931	225 days	
Minister for Justice	William McKell	Labor	17 June 1931	13 May 1932	331 days	
Minister for Justice	Sir Daniel Levy	United Australia	16 May 1932	17 June 1932	32 days	
Minister for Justice	Lewis Martin	United Australia	18 June 1932	16 August 1939	7 years, 59 days	
Minister for Justice	Vernon Treatt	United Australia	16 August 1939	16 May 1941	1 year, 273 days	
Minister for Justice	Reg Downing	Labor	19 May 1941	31 May 1960	19 years, 12 days	
Minister for Justice	Jack Mannix	Labor	31 May 1960	13 May 1965	4 years, 347 days	
Minister for Justice	John Maddison	Liberal	13 May 1965	11 May 1976	10 years, 364 days	
Minister for Justice	Ron Mulock	Labor	14 May 1976	19 October 1978	2 years, 158 days	
Minister for Justice	Frank Walker	Labor	19 October 1978	1 February 1983	4 years, 105 days	
Minister for Justice	Paul Landa	Labor	1 February 1983	5 April 1984	1 year, 64 days	
Minister for Justice	Terry Griffiths (Note: Known for 22 days as the Minister for Courts Administration and Corrective Services.)	Liberal	28 June 1991	23 September 1992	1 year, 87 days	
Minister for Justice	Ted Pickering	Liberal	23 September 1992	22 October 1992	29 days	
Minister for Justice	Wayne Merton	Liberal	22 October 1992	26 May 1993	216 days	
Minister for Justice	John Hannaford	Liberal	26 May 1993	4 April 1995	1 year, 313 days	
Minister for Justice	John Hatzistergos	Labor	2 April 2003	3 August 2005	2 years, 123 days	
Minister for Justice	Tony Kelly	Labor	3 August 2005	2 April 2007	1 year, 242 days	
Minister for Justice	John Hatzistergos	Labor	2 April 2007	30 January 2009	1 year, 303 days	
Minister for Justice	Greg Smith	Liberal	3 April 2011	17 April 2014	3 years, 14 days	
Minister for Justice	Brad Hazzard	Liberal	23 April 2014	2 April 2015	344 days	
Minister for Justice and Police	Troy Grant	National	2 April 2015	30 January 2017	1 year, 303 days	
