= Paul Landa =

Australian politician

Paul Landa QC

Member of the New South Wales Legislative Council
- In office 23 April 1973 – 3 March 1984
- Succeeded by: Fred Hankinson

Member of the New South Wales Parliament for Peats
- In office 24 March 1984 – 24 November 1984
- Preceded by: Keith O'Connell
- Succeeded by: Tony Doyle

Personal details
- Born: David Paul Landa; 29 May 1941 St Peters, New South Wales, Australia
- Died: 24 November 1984 (aged 43) Vaucluse, New South Wales, Australia
- Citizenship: Australian
- Party: Labor Party
- Spouse: Annika (1968–1984)
- Education: University of Sydney
- Profession: Lawyer

David Paul Landa, QC (29 May 1941 – 24 November 1984) was an Australian politician. In public life, he was called "Paul Landa". He was a Labor member of the New South Wales Legislative Council from 1973 to 1984, and the member for Peats in the New South Wales Legislative Assembly in 1984. He was a government minister from 1976 to 1984.

== Early life and education ==
Landa was born in St Peters in Sydney to Maurice and Fay Landa, who were of Irish/Polish descent and had migrated from Belfast. He was educated at Kogarah High School and Sydney Boys' High School in 1956–58, before studying for a Bachelor of Laws at the University of Sydney. He became a solicitor in 1964 and was admitted to the bar in 1974. On 17 December 1968, he married Annika. He was Jewish. He was the nephew of Abe Landa, who was also a NSW Government Minister.

== Career ==
In 1973, Landa was elected to the New South Wales Legislative Council as a Labor member. He became Minister for Industrial Relations in 1976, although later that year he became the Minister for Planning and Environment and became vice-president of the Executive Council. In that year he also became the Government's Leader in the Upper House. He became Education Minister in 1980, Energy Minister in 1981 and Attorney General in 1983. In 1984, he transferred to the lower house, winning the seat of Peats.

Landa was Minister for the Environment in 1979 when he and the majority of NSW Cabinet Members travelled to Terania Creek in the Northern Rivers region of NSW to investigate the reasons behind the presence of around 300 protesters, and 100 police, at Terania Creek. The protesters were stopping logging from taking place within the Terania Creek rainforest. While Landa was fully supportive of the preservation of the rainforest and the stopping of logging it was his cabinet colleague Frank Walker who had brought the matter to the Government's attention. After visiting Terania Creek themselves the Cabinet Members agreed that the Environmental Impact Study that the protesters were wanting would be carried out. The logging was stopped and never recommenced.

When he became Minister for Education in 1980 Landa distributed native trees to schools to enable the planting of native tree groves, including rainforest groves, in school grounds as a means of providing hands on environmental education to school children.

== Death and legacy ==
He died at Vaucluse, while playing tennis, on 24 November 1984. It is believed he suffered a heart attack. He was 43.

At a time when protecting the environment was seen as radical, controversial and largely unnecessary, Landa was a leader in environmental protection and education. Much of his legacy, following his death, was carried on by Bob Carr as Minister for the Environment from 1984 to 1988.

There is a public foreshore park in Pearl Beach (Gosford, New South Wales), called "Paul Landa Reserve", dedicated to Paul Landa's service.

The David Paul Landa Memorial Scholarship for Pianists was established in recognition of Landa's contribution to the arts in Australia. As of 2004 it was a biennial travelling scholarship valued at $25,000, funded by the NSW Government, managed by Musica Viva Australia in partnership with Symphony Australia. The scholarship provides the winner with concert engagements with the Sydney Symphony Orchestra and Musica Viva Australia, and a cash prize to enable overseas study. From 2004, the scholarship has been awarded to a piano finalist in the Symphony Australia Young Performers Awards. It was won in that year by Edward Neeman. Other past winners have included Tamara Anna Cislowska, Anna Goldsworthy, Duncan Gifford, Richard Jackson (2002), Clemens Leske, Maxwell Foster (2010), Oliver She (2011), and Young Kwon Cho (2012).

Political offices
Preceded by Sir John Fuller	Leader of the Government in the Legislative Council; 1976–1984	Succeeded by Barrie Unsworth
Preceded by Sir John Fuller	Vice-President of the Executive Council; 1976–1984	Succeeded by Barrie Unsworth
Preceded by Frederick Hewitt as Minister for Labour and Industry	Minister for Industrial Relations; 1976	Succeeded by Pat Hills
Preceded by Harry Jensen as Minister for Planning	Minister for Planning and Environment; 1976–1980	Succeeded by Eric Bedford
Preceded by Bill Crabtree as Minister for Environment	Minister for Planning and Environment; 1976–1980	Succeeded by Eric Bedford
Preceded by Eric Bedford	Minister for Education; 1980–1981	Succeeded by Ron Mulock
Preceded by Pat Hills	Minister for Energy; 1981–1983	Succeeded by Terry Sheahan
Preceded by Lin Gordon	Minister for Water Resources; 1981–1983	Succeeded by Paul Whelan
Preceded by Frank Walker	Attorney General of New South Wales; 1983–1984	Succeeded by Neville Wran
Preceded by Frank Walker	Minister for Justice; 1983–1984	Vacant Title next held by Terry Griffiths
Preceded by Paul Whelan	Minister for Consumer Affairs; 1983–1984	Succeeded by George Paciullo
Party political offices
Preceded by Leroy Serisier	Leader of the Labor Party in the Legislative Council; 1976–1984	Succeeded by Barrie Unsworth
New South Wales Legislative Assembly
Preceded by Keith O'Connell	Member for Peats; 1984	Succeeded by Tony Doyle
