= Jack Ferguson =

Australian politician (1924–2002)

The Honourable Jack Ferguson AO
- Ferguson in 1978

9th Deputy Premier of New South Wales
- In office 14 May 1976 – 10 February 1984
- Premier: Neville Wran
- Preceded by: Leon Punch
- Succeeded by: Ron Mulock

Member of the New South Wales Assembly for Merrylands
- In office 21 March 1959 – 5 February 1962
- Preceded by: New creation
- Succeeded by: Seat abolished

Member of the New South Wales Assembly for Fairfield
- In office 3 March 1962 – 23 January 1968
- Preceded by: Clarrie Earl
- Succeeded by: Eric Bedford

Member of the New South Wales Assembly for Merrylands
- In office 24 February 1968 – 5 March 1984
- Preceded by: New creation
- Succeeded by: Geoff Irwin

Personal details
- Born: 4 September 1924 Zetland, New South Wales, Australia
- Died: 17 September 2002 (aged 78) Sydney, New South Wales, Australia
- Party: Labor
- Spouse: Mary Ellen Bett
- Children: Laurie, Martin, Andrew, Jennifer, Deborah

Laurie John Ferguson AO (4 September 1924 – 17 September 2002) was an Australian politician and member of the New South Wales Legislative Assembly for the Australian Labor Party (New South Wales Branch). He served in Neville Wran's state government as the Deputy Premier of New South Wales from 1976 to 1984.

== Early life ==
Born in the inner Sydney suburb of Zetland, Ferguson was educated at Granville Convent and Marist Brothers College, Parramatta, both Catholic schools.

After leaving school he was variously a farmhand, textile worker, builder's labourer and bricklayer and was an organiser for the Building Workers' Industrial Union. From 1942 to 1946 he served in the Second Australian Imperial Force.

Following his demobilisation, he became active in municipal, and then state, politics. He was an alderman on Parramatta Council from 1954 to 1959, and Deputy Mayor in 1959. He married Mary Ellen Bett; the couple had three sons (Laurie, Martin and Andrew) and two daughters.

== Political career ==
Ferguson was the member for Merrylands from March 1959 to 1962 and 1968 to 5 March 1984. From 1962 to 1968, he was member for Fairfield. A member of the Labor Party's left wing, he was best known as Deputy Premier and Minister for Public Works and Minister for Ports, from May 1976 until February 1984, in the cabinet headed by Neville Wran. He was also Minister for Housing from May 1976 to February 1977.

== Death ==
Ferguson died in Sydney on 17 September 2002 (aged 78), from mesothelioma according to his son Andrew.

== Honours ==
Ferguson was made an Officer of the Order of Australia for his service to government and to the NSW parliament in the Australia Day honours in 1985.

New South Wales Legislative Assembly
New district	Member for Merrylands; 1959–1962	Seat abolished
Preceded by Clarrie Earl	Member for Fairfield; 1962–1968	Succeeded by Eric Bedford
New district	Member for Merrylands; 1968–1984	Succeeded by Geoff Irwin
Political offices
Preceded by Syd Einfeld	Deputy Leader of the Opposition of New South Wales; 1973–1976	Succeeded by John Maddison
Preceded by Leon Punch	Deputy Premier of New South Wales; 1976–1984	Succeeded by Ron Mulock
Preceded by Leon Punch	Minister for Public Works; 1976–1984	Succeeded by Laurie Brereton
Preceded by Leon Punch	Minister for Ports; 1976–1984	Succeeded by Lin Gordon
Preceded by Ian Griffith	Minister for Housing; 1976–1977	Succeeded by Ron Mulock
Party political offices
Preceded by Syd Einfeld	Deputy Leader of the Australian Labor Party in New South Wales; 1973–1984	Succeeded by Ron Mulock
