= Janice Crosio =

Australian politician

The Honourable Janice Crosio AM MBE

Member of the Australian Parliament for Prospect
- In office 24 March 1990 – 31 August 2004
- Preceded by: Dick Klugman
- Succeeded by: Chris Bowen

NSW Minister for Local Government
- In office 6 February 1986 – 25 March 1988
- Premier: Neville Wran; Barrie Unsworth
- Preceded by: Peter Anderson
- Succeeded by: David Hay

Personal details
- Born: Janice Ann Gustard; 3 January 1939 (age 87) Granville, New South Wales, Australia
- Party: NSW Labor
- Spouse: Ivo Crosio
- Occupation: Local councillor

Janice Ann Crosio AM, MBE (née Gustard; born 3 January 1939) is an Australian politician from the Labor Party. She was a member of the New South Wales Legislative Assembly, and became the first woman Cabinet minister in New South Wales. Later she was a member of the Australian House of Representatives, and a Parliamentary Secretary.

== Early life ==
Crosio was born in the Sydney suburb of Granville and educated at Strathfield Girls High School. In 1957, she married Ivo Crosio and they have one son and twin daughters. She was an alderman of Fairfield City Council in suburban Sydney from 1971 to 1980 and Mayor from 1974 to 1975 and 1977 to 1980.

== State politics ==
Crosio was the first woman elected to the New South Wales Legislative Assembly in thirty years, representing Fairfield from 1981 to 1988 and Smithfield from 1988 to 1990. She was the first woman Cabinet minister in New South Wales: Minister for Natural Resources from 1984 to 1986, Minister for Local Government from 1986 to 1988 and Minister for Water Resources from 1986 to 1988.

== Federal politics ==
Crosio represented the Division of Prospect, in New South Wales, from the 1990 federal election until standing down prior to the 2004 election. Prospect was located in western Sydney, taking its name from the Prospect Reservoir, and was centred on the areas Crosio formerly represented in the New South Wales parliament, including Fairfield and Smithfield. She was Parliamentary Secretary to the Minister for Arts and Administrative Services in 1993, Parliamentary Secretary to the Minister for Environment, Sport and Territories 1993–94 and Parliamentary Secretary to the Minister for Social Security 1994–96. Crosio was Chief Opposition Whip 2001–04. She retired at the 2004 election.

== Honours ==
Crosio was made a Member of the Order of the British Empire for services to local government and the community in 1978. She was made Knight of the Order of Merit of the Italian Republic in 1980 for services to the Italian Community. In 2006 she was made a Member (AM) in the General Division of the Order of Australia in recognition of her service to the Parliaments of the Australian Commonwealth and of New South Wales, her service to her municipality and also for her pioneering of women's participation in politics.

Janice Crosio Oval, located within Rosford Street Reserve in the Sydney suburb of Smithfield, was named in honour of Crosio.

Civic offices
Preceded by Les Powell	Mayor of Fairfield; 1974–1975	Succeeded by Ernest Loveday
Preceded by Warren Colless	Mayor of Fairfield; 1977–1980	Succeeded by
Parliament of New South Wales
Preceded by Eric Bedford	Member for Fairfield; 1981–1988	Succeeded by Geoff Irwin
New district	Member for Smithfield; 1988–1990	Succeeded by Carl Scully
Political offices
New title	Minister for Natural Resources; 1984–1986	Succeeded by John Aquilina
Preceded by Peter Anderson	Minister for Local Government; 1986–1988	Succeeded by David Hay
Vacant Title last held by Paul Whelan	Minister for Water Resources; 1986–1988	Vacant Title next held by Ian Causley
Vacant Title last held by Terry Sheahan	Assistant Minister for Transport; 1987–1988; With: John Akister	Vacant Title next held by Tim Moore
Parliament of Australia
Preceded by Dick Klugman	Member for Prospect; 1990–2004	Succeeded by Chris Bowen
Party political offices
Preceded by Leo McLeay	Chief Whip of the Australian Labor Party; 2001–2004; With: Danby, Quick	Succeeded by Roger Price
