= Leader of the Opposition in the Legislative Council (New South Wales) =

- Incumbent; Damien Tudehope since 21 April 2023
- Style: The Honourable
- Appointer: Governor of New South Wales
- Inaugural holder: Sir Henry Manning (Note: Manning refused the role of 'official' leader of the opposition, when offered to him, owing to his beliefs in a non-partisan Legislative Council. Nevertheless he was considered by his colleagues as the de facto leader of the opposition members.)
- Formation: 16 May 1941

The Leader of the Opposition in the Legislative Council is an office held in New South Wales by the leader in the New South Wales Legislative Council of the second-largest party in the New South Wales Legislative Assembly, the lower house of the Parliament of New South Wales.

No.	Name	Portrait	Party	Term of office		Tenure
1	Sir Henry Manning		United Australia	16 May 1941	22 April 1958	16 years, 341 days
1	Sir Henry Manning		Democratic	16 May 1941	22 April 1958	16 years, 341 days
1	Sir Henry Manning		Liberal	16 May 1941	22 April 1958	16 years, 341 days
2	Hector Clayton		Liberal	12 April 1960	30 October 1962	2 years, 201 days
3	Arthur Bridges		Liberal	30 October 1962	13 May 1965	2 years, 195 days
4	Reg Downing		Labor	13 May 1965	4 February 1972	6 years, 267 days
5	Neville Wran		Labor	22 February 1972	19 October 1973	1 year, 239 days
6	Leroy Serisier		Labor	3 December 1973	13 May 1976	2 years, 162 days
7	Sir John Fuller		Country	14 May 1976	1 August 1978	2 years, 79 days
8	Max Willis		Liberal	1 August 1978	20 October 1981	3 years, 80 days
9	Lloyd Lange		Liberal	20 October 1981	3 April 1984	2 years, 166 days
10	Ted Pickering		Liberal	3 April 1984	24 March 1988	3 years, 356 days
11	Jack Hallam		Labor	6 April 1988	2 May 1991	3 years, 26 days
12	Michael Egan		Labor	2 July 1991	4 April 1995	3 years, 276 days
13	John Hannaford		Liberal	11 April 1995	31 March 1999	3 years, 354 days
14	Mike Gallacher		Liberal	31 March 1999	4 March 2011	11 years, 338 days
15	Tony Kelly		Labor	8 April 2011	6 June 2011	59 days
16	Luke Foley		Labor	14 June 2011	8 April 2015	3 years, 298 days
17	Adam Searle		Labor	8 April 2015	8 June 2021	6 years, 61 days
18	Penny Sharpe		Labor	8 June 2021	28 March 2023	1 year, 293 days
19	Damien Tudehope		Liberal	21 April 2023	incumbent	3 years, 139 days
Source: Parliament of New South Wales.
