= Eric Bedford =

Australian politician

The Honourable Eric Bedford

Member of the New South Wales Legislative Assembly for Fairfield
- In office 24 February 1968 – 28 August 1981
- Preceded by: Jack Ferguson
- Succeeded by: Janice Crosio

Member of the New South Wales Legislative Assembly for Cabramatta
- In office 19 September 1981 – 31 December 1985
- Preceded by: District created
- Succeeded by: John Newman

Personal details
- Born: Eric Lance Bedford; 19 February 1928 Concord, New South Wales, Australia
- Died: 8 July 2006 (aged 78) Sydney, New South Wales, Australia
- Party: Labor Party

Eric Lance Bedford (18 February 1928 – 8 July 2006) was an Australian politician, affiliated with the Labor Party and elected as a member of the New South Wales Legislative Assembly.

Bedford was born at Concord, NSW, and attended Fort Street Boys High School before studying at Sydney Teachers College and embarking on a teaching career in country areas. He took an Arts degree through external study and returned to teach at Liverpool Boys High School and later Bankstown Girls High School. After high school, he went to the University of New England .

While at Liverpool Boys High, Bedford met Gough Whitlam and enquired about rejoining the Labor Party, of which he had been a member in his youth. He later served as Gough Whitlam's campaign director at the 1966 election, and Whitlam persuaded Eric to stand for state parliament in the seat of Fairfield, which was vacant as a result of a redistribution.

Bedford won the seat and served as the Member for Fairfield between 1968 and 1981 and then represented the seat of Cabramatta. He served as the Minister for Education in the Wran Government from May 1976 to February 1980. He then served as Minister for Planning and the Environment, Minister for Industry and Minister for Small Business until the end of his political career in 1985.

He received the Queen Elizabeth II Silver Jubilee Medal in 1977 and was invested with the Red Danice Hrvatske (Order of the Croatian Daystar) for services to education. In 1986 he was granted permission to retain the title "The Honourable".

Bedford died in Sydney on 8 July 2006 (aged 78).

New South Wales Legislative Assembly
Preceded by Jack Ferguson	Member for Fairfield; 1968–1981	Succeeded by Janice Crosio
New district	Member for Cabramatta; 1981–1985	Succeeded by John Newman
Political offices
Preceded by Neil Pickard	Minister for Education; 1976–1980	Succeeded by Paul Landa
Preceded by Paul Landa	Minister for Planning and Environment; 1980–1984	Succeeded by Terry Sheahan
Preceded by Ron Mulock	Minister for Education; 1984	Succeeded by Rodney Cavalier
