= Peter Anderson (politician) =

Australian politician (born 1947)

The Honourable Peter Anderson AM

Member of the New South Wales Parliament for Nepean
- In office 1978–1981
- Preceded by: Ron Rofe
- Succeeded by: District abolished

Member of the New South Wales Parliament for Penrith
- In office 1981–1988
- Preceded by: Ron Mulock
- Succeeded by: Guy Matheson

Member of the New South Wales Parliament for Liverpool
- In office 1989–1995
- Preceded by: George Paciullo
- Succeeded by: Paul Lynch

New South Wales Minister for Health
- In office 4 July 1986 – 25 March 1988
- Preceded by: Barrie Unsworth
- Succeeded by: Peter Collins

Personal details
- Born: 23 November 1947 (age 78) Bondi Junction, New South Wales
- Party: Labor Party
- Spouse: Elizabeth Anderson
- Relations: Keith Anderson (father); Kath Anderson (mother)
- Children: 1 (m), 1 (f)
- Occupation: Public servant, policeman

Peter Thomas Anderson AM (born 23 November 1947), a former Australian politician, was a member of the New South Wales Legislative Assembly representing Nepean between 1978 and 1981, Penrith between 1981 and 1988, and Liverpool between 1989 and 1995 for the Labor Party. During his parliamentary career, Anderson held a range of portfolios including Minister for Health, Minister for Aboriginal Affairs, Minister for Youth and Community Services, Minister for Local Government, Minister for Corrective Services, Minister for Police and Emergency Services between 1981 and 1988.

== Early years and background ==
Anderson was born in Bondi Junction, the son of Keith Anderson, a member of the New South Wales Legislative Assembly representing Paddington-Waverley between 1961 and 1962, and Kath Anderson, who was a member of the Legislative Council between 1973 and 1981.

Anderson was educated at Woollahra Public School and Sydney Boys High School (1960–64) and joined the Labor party at age 16. He served in the New South Wales Police Force from 1967 until 1977 and eventually became a Police prosecutor. He subsequently worked in the office of the Minister for Justice, Ron Mulock. Anderson was an alderman on the Penrith City Council from 1977 until 1983 and the Deputy Mayor in 1977–79.

== Political career ==
Prior to the 1978 election, Anderson won Labor Party pre-selection for the seat of Nepean. At the subsequent election, which was a landslide victory for the ALP under Neville Wran, Anderson defeated the sitting Liberal Party member, Ron Rofe. However, he represented the electorate for only one term as it was abolished in a redistribution before the 1981 election. Anderson then represented the seat of Penrith replacing the previous member (Mulock) who moved to the seat of St Marys. In a shock result, Anderson lost the previously safe Labor seat at the 1988 election to the Liberals' Guy Matheson.

Anderson's exile from state parliament was short-lived. In February 1989, former cabinet minister George Paciullo resigned from the seat of Liverpool, having lost a caucus ballot for the post of Opposition Leader. This resignation resulted in a bitter pre-selection struggle among local party members for the ensuing by-election. Support was divided between Mark Latham from Labor's Centre Unity faction and the left's Paul Lynch. Intervention from the party's central office resulted in Anderson being imposed as the Labor candidate. Anderson was victorious at the by-election and the 1991 election. However, he failed to cement support amongst his local party members, and lost party pre-selection to Lynch prior to the 1995 election. By this time Anderson was seen as an ambitious and divisive threat to Bob Carr (Labor leader since 1988), and the party central office declined to intervene on his behalf or nominate him for the Legislative Council. Anderson's public political career ended at the 1995 election but he was subsequently appointed Chairman of the New South Wales Tow Truck Authority.

In parliament Anderson was a prominent member of the right faction. His leadership aspirations became clear in 1986, when he was the only declared challenger to Barrie Unsworth's succession to Wran as Premier of New South Wales. He held prominent ministerial posts in the Wran and Unsworth Governments. He was the Minister for Police and Emergency Services from 1982 until 1986 and Minister for Corrective Services from 1983 until 1984. In 1986 he was the Minister for Local Government, Youth and Community Services and Aboriginal Affairs. In the Unsworth Government (1986–1988) he was the Minister for Health.

== Career after politics ==
In 2006, Anderson was appointed the Director of the Macquarie University Centre for Policing, Intelligence and Counter Terrorism. In July 2010, the Independent Commission Against Corruption commissioned an independent investigation into a number of complaints by nine of twelve staff alleging bullying, victimisation and inappropriate recruitment practices. The investigation concluded "the practice of relying on direct appointments and short-term appointments and making ad hoc appointments in the absence of any planned approach to staffing has led to justifiable perceptions that the processes of recruitment and selection are corrupt." The report found evidence of bullying, victimisation and conflicts of interest by Anderson.

In 2013, Peter Anderson retired and his position was advertised as vacant pending his retirement in December 2013.

New South Wales Legislative Assembly
Preceded by Ron Rofe	Member for Nepean; 1978–1981	District abolished
Preceded by Ron Mulock	Member for Penrith; 1981–1988	Succeeded by Guy Matheson
Preceded by George Paciullo	Member for Liverpool; 1989–1995	Succeeded by Paul Lynch
Political offices
Preceded by Barrie Unsworth	Minister for Health and Minister for the Drug Offensive; 1986–1988	Succeeded by Peter Collins
Preceded by George Paciullo	Minister for Aboriginal Affairs; 1986	Succeeded by Ken Gabb
Preceded by Frank Walker	Minister for Youth and Community Services; 1986	Succeeded by John Aquilina
Preceded by Kevin Stewart	Minister for Local Government; 1986	Succeeded by Janice Crosio
Preceded by Rex Jackson	Minister for Corrective Services; 1983–1984	Succeeded by John Akister
Preceded by Bill Crabtree	Minister for Police and Emergency Services; 1981–1986	Succeeded by George Paciullo
