= Frank Walker (Australian politician) =

Australian politician

The Honourable Francis John Walker QC
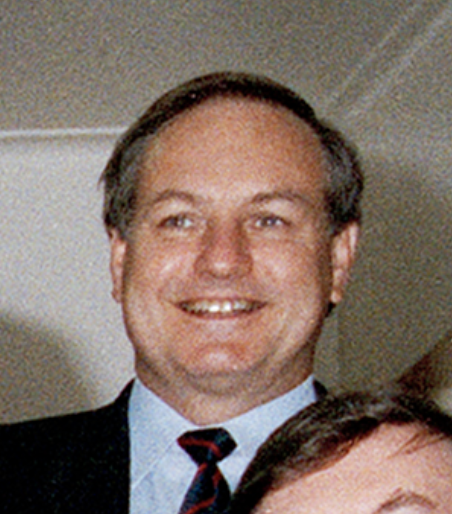

Vice-President of the Executive Council
- In office 24 March 1993 – 25 March 1994
- Preceded by: Ralph Willis
- Succeeded by: Gary Johns

41st Attorney General of New South Wales
- In office 14 May 1976 – 1 February 1983
- Premier: Neville Wran
- Preceded by: John Maddison
- Succeeded by: Paul Landa

Member of the Australian Parliament for Robertson
- In office 24 March 1990 – 2 March 1996
- Preceded by: Barry Cohen
- Succeeded by: Jim Lloyd

Member of the New South Wales Parliament for Georges River
- In office 19 September 1970 – 22 February 1988
- Preceded by: Douglas Cross
- Succeeded by: Terry Griffiths

Personal details
- Born: 7 July 1942 Sydney
- Died: 12 June 2012 (aged 69) Sydney
- Party: Australian Labor Party
- Education: University of Sydney (L.L.B., L.L.M.)
- Occupation: Lawyer, barrister

Francis John Walker, QC (7 July 1942 – 12 June 2012) was an Australian politician and judge. He was a member of the New South Wales Legislative Assembly representing Georges River between 1970 and 1988 and subsequently a member of the Australian House of Representatives representing Robertson between 1990 and 1996, both for the Australian Labor Party. During his parliamentary careers, Walker held a range of ministerial responsibilities. He was the first New South Wales Minister for Aboriginal Affairs and was responsible for some of the first legislation that recognised the obligation to financially compensate indigenous Australians for the loss of their land. He has been given credit for achieving one of the first big breakthroughs in the protection of Australia's natural environment, the saving of the Terania Creek rainforest.

== Early life ==
Walker was born in Sydney and spent early formative years with his father, a blacklisted communist, and Walker's brother in a jungle village in Papua New Guinea. Aged 12, the family moved to the New South Wales north coast regional centre of Coffs Harbour where he completed his secondary schooling. As a teenager, he was beaten by police for sitting with Aborigines in the segregated part of the local theatre. Walker developed early empathy for the budding Aboriginal rights movement.

He graduated from the University of Sydney in 1964, with an LLB, progressing to an LLM in 1969. An articled clerk from 1960 to 1965, a solicitor from 1965 to 1976 and a barrister from 1976 to 1988, he was appointed as a Queens Counsel in 1981.

== Political career ==
=== New South Wales political career ===
A prominent figure of the left-wing, Walker was elected as the member of the New South Wales Legislative Assembly from 1970 to 1988, representing Georges River for the Australian Labor Party. He became the Attorney General with the election of Neville Wran's government in 1976 and was the youngest person to have held this post, aged 34. During his term as Attorney General between 1976 and 1983, Walker was notable for a reform agenda that included the first state-based land rights legislation, repealing the Summary Offences Act (NSW), which allowed police to act with impunity against the poor and homeless, major changes to the so-called "rape" laws, and opening up corporate fraud to greater scrutiny. Walker suffered a number of reprisals as a result of his reform agenda, and struggled to pass transgender rights legislation following lobbying by Noelena Tame and Roberta Perkins.

He served as Minister for Justice from 1978 to 1983, Minister for Aboriginal Affairs from 1981 to 1984, Minister for Youth and Community Services from 1983 to 1986, Minister for Housing from 1983 to 1988 and Minister for the Arts from 1986 to 1988. When the Unsworth government was defeated at the 1988 poll, he lost his seat.

=== Federal political career ===
Walker was elected as the member for Robertson in the Federal Parliament in 1990. He was Special Minister of State and Vice-President of the Executive Council from March 1993 to March 1994 and then Minister for Administrative Services until the defeat of the Keating government in 1996, when he also lost his seat.

Walker's state and federal career both ended the same way that of him losing his seat at the same time that a sitting government, which he was a minister of, had been defeated.

As a state minister, Walker's portfolios included Attorney General and Aboriginal Affairs and while he did not serve in these two portfolios as a federal minister he did however revisit these portfolio areas. This was due to the High Court's ruling on Mabo falling under his purview as Special Minister of State.

== Career after politics ==
Frank Walker served as a Judge of the Compensation Court of New South Wales between 1997 and 2003. On the abolition of the Compensation Court in 2003, he was appointed to the District Court of New South Wales and the Dust Diseases Tribunal of New South Wales. His caseload in the Dust Diseases Tribunal predominantly consisted of mesothelioma-related cases, and he retired in 2006.

He was also president of the Schizophrenia Fellowship from 1998 until his death in 2012. His two sons, who had schizophrenia, both killed themselves when they were 33.

Walker died of cancer, aged 69. His family accepted the offer of a state funeral that was held on 19 June 2012 at the Sydney Conservatorium of Music and was attended by several hundred people, including former Prime Minister Paul Keating, and three ex-premiers, including Nick Greiner, members of the indigenous Australian community, lawyers, judges (including former High Court Judge, Mary Gaudron QC), party faithful, unionists, friends and family. Michael Gallacher MLC represented the NSW Premier, and Anthony Albanese MP represented the Prime Minister.

A memorial lecture is held each year to commemorate Walker's life and achievements by the NSW Society of Labor Lawyers.

== Bibliography ==
=== Forewords ===
- Walker, Frank (1979). Foreword. The Court is Open- A Guide to the Magistrates Court. By Bartley, Reg. Petty Publishing and Marianne Publishing.

New South Wales Legislative Assembly
Preceded by Douglas Cross	Member for Georges River; 1970–1988	Succeeded by Terry Griffiths
Political offices
Preceded by John Maddison	Attorney General of New South Wales; 1976–1983	Succeeded by Paul Landa
Preceded by Ron Mulock	Minister of Justice; 1978–1983	Succeeded by Paul Landa
New title	Minister of Aboriginal Affairs; 1981–1984	Succeeded by Paul Whelan
Preceded by Kevin Stewart	Minister for Youth and Community Services; 1983–1986	Succeeded by Peter Anderson
Preceded by Terry Sheahan	Minister for Housing; 1983–1988	Succeeded by Joe Schipp
Preceded by Neville Wran	Minister for the Arts; 1986–1988	Succeeded by Peter Collins
Parliament of Australia
Preceded by Barry Cohen	Member for Robertson; 1990–1996	Succeeded by Jim Lloyd
Political offices
New title	Special Minister of State; 1993–1994	Succeeded by Gary Johns
Preceded by Ralph Willis	Vice-President of the Executive Council; 1993–1994	Succeeded by Gary Johns
Preceded by Bob McMullan	Minister for Administrative Services; 1994–1996	Succeeded by David Jull
