= Ron Mulock =

Australian politician (1930–2014)

The Honourable Ron Mulock AO KCSG

10th Deputy Premier of New South Wales
- In office 10 February 1984 – 25 March 1988
- Premier: Neville Wran; Barrie Unsworth
- Preceded by: Jack Ferguson
- Succeeded by: Wal Murray
- Constituency: Nepean 1971–73; Penrith 1973–81; St Marys 1981–88

Personal details
- Born: Ronald Joseph Moore; 11 January 1930 Darlinghurst, New South Wales
- Died: 4 September 2014 (aged 84) Penrith, New South Wales
- Party: Australian Labor Party (New South Wales Branch)
- Spouse: Desley Mulock (m. 1957–2014) (widowed)
- Profession: Solicitor

Ronald Joseph Mulock AO KCSG (11 January 1930 – 4 September 2014) was an Australian politician. A former City of Penrith mayor, he was an Australian Labor Party member of the New South Wales Legislative Assembly from 1971 to 1988. He was Deputy Premier of New South Wales under Neville Wran and Barrie Unsworth from 1984 to 1988.

== Early years ==
Ron Mulock was born in the Sydney suburb of Darlinghurst on 11 January 1930 and baptised a Catholic. His surname at birth was Moore but he was fostered at ten months to Elizabeth Mulock (née Goode). She adopted Ron when he was 14. He was educated at St Declan's in Penshurst and De La Salle College (now Casimir Catholic College), Marrickville. Mulock was an outstanding sportsman at school and subsequently played first grade cricket between 1949 and 1962 for the St George, Waverley and Cumberland Clubs. In the 1959–60 season he was the highest wicket-taker (49) in the Sydney First Grade Competition. At his peak, Mulock was said to be one of the best fast bowlers outside the Test team. He was a foundation member and later Patron of the Penrith Panthers Rugby League team.

Mulock studied law part-time and received an LL.B from the University of Sydney in 1957. He was admitted as a Solicitor of the Supreme Court on 2 September 1955 and started his own practice in Penrith on Sydney's western outskirts. By the time Mulock went into Parliament in 1971, his firm employed 20 people. He was an alderman on Penrith City Council for six years, and served as Mayor from 1968 to 1971. Mulock was initially elected as an independent but joined the ALP in 1968.

== Political career ==
As a state parliamentarian, Mulock represented Nepean from 1971 to 1973, Penrith from 1973 to 1981 and St Marys from 1981 until his retirement at the 1988 election. After the 1973 election, Mulock became Shadow Attorney-General and Justice Minister.

When the Wran government achieved power in May 1976 (ending the Labor Party's 11-year period in opposition), Mulock became Minister of Justice (until October 1978) and Minister for Services (until February 1977). He was also Minister for Housing from February 1977 to October 1978, Minister for Mineral Resources and Development from October 1978 to February 1980 and Minister for Mineral Resources and Technology from February 1980 to October 1981. Mulock served as Minister for Education from October 1981 to February 1984.

A champion of increased resources for Sydney's west, Mulock expanded Milperra College of Advanced Education into the Macarthur Institute of Higher Education and worked for the establishment of a university in western Sydney. On 20 March 1987, Mulock and Premier Barrie Unsworth (who had taken over from Wran the previous year) concluded a Commonwealth/State agreement that resulted in the establishment of the University of Western Sydney in 1989.

On 10 February 1984, Mulock's strong performance and personal popularity led to him becoming Deputy Premier after the retirement of Jack Ferguson. He was opposed by both major ALP factions and Wran, his chief rivals for the job having been the left-wing Frank Walker and the right-wing Terry Sheahan. On the first ballot, Walker polled 32 votes, Mulock 20, and Sheahan 17. When Sheahan was eliminated from the contest, all but one of his preferences flowed to Mulock who was victorious by 36 votes to 33.

Mulock was Minister for Health from February 1984 to 1986. It was the most demanding period in his 12-year Ministerial career. During most of his tenure he dealt with a bitter dispute with the medical profession. Mulock was Minister for Transport from February 1986 to November 1987. With Education and Health, Transport was one of the top three recurrent spending portfolios. He held all three in succession, the only NSW Minister since Federation to have done so. Mulock served as Attorney-General from November 1987 until the defeat of the Unsworth government in March 1988.

== After politics ==
In 1988, Mulock was made an Officer of the Order of Australia in recognition of his services to the NSW Parliament. After leaving politics, he was involved in commercial consultancy and legal mediation. Mulock was appointed to the Greiner Government's Electricity Transmission Planning Committee in 1991 and chaired the Penrith Lakes Committee from 1996 to 2001. He was involved with sporting, education welfare and disability advocacy groups. In 2013, Pope Francis appointed Ron a Knight Commander of the Order of St Gregory the Great ‘for dedication to the faith and service to the community’.

Ron Mulock died on 4 September 2014 at the age of 84. He is survived by his wife (since 11 May 1957) Desley, two sons, a daughter and nine grandchildren. Two sons predeceased him. Mulock is interred at Pine Grove Memorial Park.

Civic offices
Preceded by Bill Chapman	Mayor of Penrith; 1968–1971	Succeeded by Brian King
New South Wales Legislative Assembly
Preceded by Ron Dunbier	Member for Nepean; 1971–1973	Succeeded by Ron Rofe
New district	Member for Penrith; 1973–1981	Succeeded by Peter Anderson
New district	Member for St Marys; 1981–1988	District abolished
Political offices
Preceded by John Maddison	Minister of Justice; 1976–1978	Succeeded by Frank Walker
Preceded by John Waddy	Minister for Services; 1976–1977	Succeeded by William Haigh
Preceded by Jack Ferguson	Minister for Housing; 1977–1978	Succeeded by Syd Einfeld
Preceded by Pat Hills	Minister for Mineral Resources; 1978–1981	Succeeded by Neville Wran
Preceded by Pat Hills	Minister for Technology; 1980–1981	Succeeded by Pat Hills
Preceded by Paul Landa	Minister for Education; 1981–1984	Succeeded by Rodney Cavalier
Preceded by Jack Ferguson	Deputy Premier of New South Wales; 1984–1988	Succeeded by Wal Murray
Preceded by Laurie Brereton	Minister for Health; 1984–1986	Succeeded by Barrie Unsworth
Preceded by Barrie Unsworth	Minister for Transport; 1986–1987	Succeeded by Terry Sheahan
Preceded by Terry Sheahan	Attorney General of New South Wales; 1987–1988	Succeeded by John Dowd
Party political offices
Preceded by Jack Ferguson	Deputy Leader of the Australian Labor Party in New South Wales; 1984–1988	Succeeded by Andrew Refshauge
