= George Paciullo =

Australian politician (1934–2012)

George Paciullo OAM

Minister for Police and Emergency Services (New South Wales)
- In office 6 February 1986 – 25 March 1988
- Premier: Barrie Unsworth
- Preceded by: Peter Anderson
- Succeeded by: Ted Pickering

Member of the New South Wales Legislative Assembly for Liverpool
- In office 13 February 1971 – 19 February 1989
- Preceded by: Jack Mannix
- Succeeded by: Peter Anderson

Personal details
- Born: 20 February 1934 Sydney, New South Wales, Australia
- Died: 9 October 2012 (aged 78) Liverpool, Sydney, New South Wales, Australia
- Party: Australian Labor Party (New South Wales Branch)
- Spouse: Janette Ruth Paciullo
- Children: Murray Paciullo
- Occupation: Draftsman

George Paciullo, OAM (Italian: [paˈtʃullo]; 20 February 1934 – 9 October 2012) was an Australian politician. He was the Labor member for Liverpool in the New South Wales Legislative Assembly from 1971 to 1989, and served as a minister from 1984 to 1988.

Paciullo was born in Sydney to market gardener Sisto Paciullo and his wife Immacolata, who had come to Australia from Calabria during the Great Depression. He attended public schools at Liverpool and Homebush, and was employed as a survey draftsmen with the New South Wales Soil Conservation Service upon his graduation in 1951. He underwent national service in 1952 and subsequently served in the Citizen Military Forces for three years. In 1958, he joined the Labor Party, and the following year was elected to Liverpool City Council. On 3 November 1964, he married Janette Blinman, with whom he had a son named Murray. He continued as both a draftsman and a councillor until 1971.

In 1971, the member for the local state seat of Liverpool, Jack Mannix, retired, and Paciullo was preselected as the replacement Labor candidate. He was elected easily, and was never troubled in his own electorate. In 1973 he became Shadow Minister for Sport, Recreation and Tourism.

When Labor, under Neville Wran, won government in 1976, Paciullo was appointed Minister for Roads, moving to Industry and Small Business from February to April 1984 and then to Consumer Affairs and Aboriginal Affairs. In 1986, when Wran resigned and Barrie Unsworth succeeded him in the Premiership, Paciullo became Police and Emergency Services Minister.

After Labor suffered a landslide defeat by the Nick Greiner-led Coalition in 1988, Unsworth retired as party leader. Paciullo was a candidate for the leadership position, but lost out to Bob Carr.

Shortly afterwards Paciullo resigned from parliament; the by-election held to replace him was acrimonious, as the former member for Penrith, Peter Anderson, was chosen as candidate after a protracted preselection dispute between the Left's Paul Lynch and the Right's Mark Latham.

After 1988 Paciullo returned to local politics, serving again on Liverpool City Council as mayor from 1994 to 2003. On 14 June 1999 he was awarded the Medal of the Order of Australia. He was appointed to the board of the NRMA in 2000. On 26 May 2002 he was made a life member of the Labor Party.

Paciullo died at Liverpool Hospital in Sydney on 9 October 2012, aged 78, of complications related to non-Hodgkin's lymphoma.

New South Wales Legislative Assembly
Preceded by Jack Mannix	Member for Liverpool; 1971–1989	Succeeded by Peter Anderson
