= Terry Sheahan =

Australian politician

The Honourable Terry Sheahan AO

Member of the New South Wales Legislative Assembly
- In office 17 November 1973 – 19 March 1988
- Preceded by: Bill Sheahan
- Succeeded by: Alby Schultz
- Constituency: Burrinjuck

Attorney General of New South Wales
- In office 5 December 1984 – 26 November 1987
- Preceded by: Paul Landa
- Succeeded by: Trevor Anderson

Terence William "Terry" Sheahan, AO(born 18 August 1947) is an Australian judge and former politician. He was the Labor member for Burrinjuck in the New South Wales Legislative Assembly from 1973 to 1988, and held various ministerial portfolios (including Attorney General of New South Wales) between 1980 and 1988. On 9 April 1997 he was appointed to a judge on the New South Wales Land and Environment Court, and in 2019 retired from this role. He is the current patron of ADRA - Australian Dispute Resolution Association, a professional mediation association and accreditation body.

Terry Sheahan was the only son of Bill Sheahan, who was also a member of the Legislative Assembly (1941–73). He attended school in Lewisham before studying at the University of Sydney, receiving a Bachelor of Arts and a Bachelor of Law in 1969. He worked as a solicitor from 1967 and was called to the bar in 1982. He had joined the Willoughby branch of the Labor Party in January 1964 and went on to be a member of the Yass, Cootamundra and Gladesville branches. On 26 May 1973, he married Mary Christine Ridley, with whom he had eight children.

In 1973, Bill Sheahan retired and Terry was elected to his seat of Burrinjuck. He was secretary of the Parliamentary Labor Party from 1976 until his elevation to the ministry in 1980 as Housing and Cooperative Services Minister. In 1983 he became Energy and Finance Minister, moving to Planning and Environment in 1984. Later in 1984 he became Attorney General, a post he held until 1987, when he became Transport Minister. Sheahan was defeated in Burrinjuck by Liberal candidate Alby Schultz when Labor lost office in 1988.

In 1989, Sheahan became President of the New South Wales Labor Party, serving until 1997, when he resigned to accept an appointment as a Judge of the Land and Environment Court of New South Wales, a post he continues to hold. He divorced his wife Mary in 2003, and on 19 August 2007 married Dr Jennifer Lynette Hardy.

New South Wales Legislative Assembly
Preceded by Bill Sheahan	Member for Burrinjuck; 1973–1988	Succeeded by Alby Schultz
Political offices
Preceded by Neville Wran	Attorney General of New South Wales; 1984–1987	Succeeded by Ron Mulock
