= Electoral results for the district of Riverstone =

Election results for Riverstone, New South Wales, Australia

Riverstone, an electoral district of the Legislative Assembly in the Australian state of New South Wales, was created in 1981.

== Members for Riverstone ==
Election	Member	Party
1981	Tony Johnson	Labor
1983 by	Richard Amery	Labor
1984	Richard Amery	Labor
1988	Richard Amery	Labor
1991	John Aquilina	Labor
1995	John Aquilina	Labor
1999	John Aquilina	Labor
2003	John Aquilina	Labor
2007	John Aquilina	Labor
2011	Kevin Conolly	Liberal
2015	Kevin Conolly	Liberal
2019	Kevin Conolly	Liberal
2023	Warren Kirby	Labor

== Election results ==
=== Elections in the 2020s ===
==== 2023 ====
2023 New South Wales state election: Riverstone
Party	Candidate	Votes	%	±%
Labor	Warren Kirby	24,580	44.2	+4.2
Liberal	Mohit Kumar	22,167	39.9	−14.1
Greens	Rob Vail	3,969	7.1	+1.2
Shooters, Fishers, Farmers	Anthony Belcastro	1,816	3.3	+3.3
Independent	Tabitha Ponnambalam	1,761	3.2	+3.2
Sustainable Australia	Tim Horan	1,282	2.3	+2.3
Total formal votes		55,575	96.9	−0.2
Informal votes		1,793	3.1	+0.2
Turnout		57,368	90.4	+5.4
Two-party-preferred result
Labor	Warren Kirby	27,662	53.7	+9.9
Liberal	Mohit Kumar	23,848	46.3	−9.9
Labor gain from Liberal		Swing	+9.9	

=== Elections in the 2010s ===
==== 2019 ====
2019 New South Wales state election: Riverstone
Party	Candidate	Votes	%	±%
Liberal	Kevin Conolly	28,956	54.11	−1.08
Labor	Annemarie Christie	21,328	39.86	+8.30
Greens	Alex Van Vucht	3,226	6.03	+0.62
Total formal votes		53,510	97.08	+0.27
Informal votes		1,612	2.92	−0.27
Turnout		55,122	92.02	−1.01
Two-party-preferred result
Liberal	Kevin Conolly	29,337	56.34	−5.90
Labor	Annemarie Christie	22,735	43.66	+5.90
Liberal hold		Swing	−5.90	

==== 2015 ====
2015 New South Wales state election: Riverstone
Party	Candidate	Votes	%	±%
Liberal	Kevin Conolly	25,918	55.2	−3.2
Labor	Ian Morrison	14,819	31.6	+7.9
Greens	Rob Vail	2,541	5.4	+0.0
Christian Democrats	Allan Green	2,525	5.4	+0.7
No Land Tax	Karen Cacciotti	1,152	2.5	+2.5
Total formal votes		46,955	96.8	+1.3
Informal votes		1,549	3.2	−1.3
Turnout		48,504	93.0	+4.6
Two-party-preferred result
Liberal	Kevin Conolly	27,065	62.2	−7.8
Labor	Ian Morrison	16,418	37.8	+7.8
Liberal hold		Swing	−7.8	

==== 2011 ====
2011 New South Wales state election: Riverstone
Party	Candidate	Votes	%	±%
Liberal	Kevin Conolly	29,971	58.1	+22.9
Labor	Michael Vassili	12,013	23.3	−30.4
Greens	Jess Harwood	2,943	5.7	+1.4
Christian Democrats	Allan Green	2,178	4.2	+4.2
Family First	Jason Cornelius	1,701	3.3	+3.3
Independent	Rosarie Bonham	1,445	2.8	+2.8
Independent	Geno Belcastro	791	1.5	+1.5
Independent Australia First	Tony Pettitt	585	1.1	-2.5
Total formal votes		51,627	96.0	−1.0
Informal votes		2,127	4.0	+1.0
Turnout		53,754	93.6	
Two-party-preferred result
Liberal	Kevin Conolly	31,888	70.2	+30.2
Labor	Michael Vassili	13,555	29.8	−30.2
Liberal gain from Labor		Swing	+30.2	

=== Elections in the 2000s ===
==== 2007 ====
2007 New South Wales state election: Riverstone
Party	Candidate	Votes	%	±%
Labor	John Aquilina	23,809	53.6	+0.8
Liberal	Kevin Conolly	15,589	35.1	+9.1
Greens	Sheryl Jarecki	1,918	4.3	−0.3
Independent	Tony Pettitt	1,607	3.6	+3.6
Against Further Immigration	Ronald Atkins	1,474	3.3	+1.1
Total formal votes		44,397	97.1	+0.2
Informal votes		1,346	2.9	−0.2
Turnout		45,743	93.8	
Two-party-preferred result
Labor	John Aquilina	24,925	60.1	−3.3
Liberal	Kevin Conolly	16,568	39.9	+3.3
Labor hold		Swing	−3.3	

==== 2003 ====
2003 New South Wales state election: Riverstone
Party	Candidate	Votes	%	±%
Labor	John Aquilina	27,450	57.1	+2.2
Liberal	Ray Williams	13,531	28.2	+2.6
Christian Democrats	Greg Tan	2,174	4.5	+4.5
Greens	Sheryl Jarecki	2,087	4.3	+0.7
Democrats	Tom Peacock	1,109	2.3	−2.2
One Nation	Paul Cluderay	868	1.8	−7.6
Against Further Immigration	Norm Parsons	828	1.7	−0.3
Total formal votes		48,047	97.0	−0.2
Informal votes		1,504	3.0	+0.2
Turnout		49,551	93.3	
Two-party-preferred result
Labor	John Aquilina	29,176	66.1	−1.1
Liberal	Ray Williams	14,994	33.9	+1.1
Labor hold		Swing	−1.1	

=== Elections in the 1990s ===
==== 1999 ====
1999 New South Wales state election: Riverstone
Party	Candidate	Votes	%	±%
Labor	John Aquilina	23,148	54.9	−0.3
Liberal	Joan McIntyre	10,779	25.6	−9.5
One Nation	Tony Pettitt	3,964	9.4	+9.4
Democrats	Thomas Peacock	1,908	4.5	−1.7
Greens	Cedric Hawkins	1,522	3.6	+3.6
Against Further Immigration	John King	838	2.0	+2.0
Total formal votes		42,159	97.2	+2.9
Informal votes		1,216	2.8	−2.9
Turnout		43,375	94.0	
Two-party-preferred result
Labor	John Aquilina	25,188	67.2	+7.2
Liberal	Joan McIntyre	12,316	32.8	−7.2
Labor hold		Swing	+7.2	

==== 1995 ====
1995 New South Wales state election: Riverstone
Party	Candidate	Votes	%	±%
Labor	John Aquilina	20,597	55.9	+4.3
Liberal	Ray Morris	12,675	34.4	−1.1
Democrats	Bill Clancy	2,282	6.2	+3.0
Call to Australia	Robert Bowden	1,294	3.5	+1.4
Total formal votes		36,848	94.2	+5.1
Informal votes		2,263	5.8	−5.1
Turnout		39,111	94.4	
Two-party-preferred result
Labor	John Aquilina	21,666	60.6	+3.1
Liberal	Ray Morris	14,070	39.4	−3.1
Labor hold		Swing	+3.1	

==== 1991 ====
1991 New South Wales state election: Riverstone
Party	Candidate	Votes	%	±%
Labor	John Aquilina	15,886	51.6	+3.4
Liberal	Allan Green	10,905	35.5	−6.1
Independent	Michael Corbin	2,337	7.6	+7.6
Democrats	Bill Clancy	993	3.2	+3.2
Call to Australia	Royalene Edwards	639	2.1	+2.1
Total formal votes		30,760	89.1	−6.8
Informal votes		3,753	10.9	+6.8
Turnout		34,513	94.8	
Two-party-preferred result
Labor	John Aquilina	16,931	57.5	+4.5
Liberal	Allan Green	12,518	42.5	−4.5
Labor hold		Swing	+4.5	

=== Elections in the 1980s ===
==== 1988 ====
1988 New South Wales state election: Riverstone
Party	Candidate	Votes	%	±%
Labor	Richard Amery	16,648	57.2	−7.1
Liberal	Kenneth Jessup	12,471	42.8	+8.2
Total formal votes		29,119	94.8	−1.2
Informal votes		1,597	5.2	+1.2
Turnout		30,716	92.3	
Labor hold		Swing	−7.6	

==== 1984 ====
1984 New South Wales state election: Riverstone
Party	Candidate	Votes	%	±%
Labor	Richard Amery	17,731	64.9	−6.2
Liberal	Kenneth Jessup	9,608	35.1	+10.5
Total formal votes		27,339	95.1	+0.5
Informal votes		1,395	4.9	−0.5
Turnout		28,734	92.3	+2.2
Labor hold		Swing	−8.3	

==== 1983 by-election ====
1983 Riverstone by-election Saturday 22 October
Party	Candidate	Votes	%	±%
Labor	Richard Amery	12,541	59.7	−11.4
Liberal	Kenneth Jessup	7,583	36.1	+11.5
Independent	Winston Brass	897	4.3	
Total formal votes		21,021	97.2	
Informal votes		609	2.8	
Turnout		21,630	69.3	
Labor hold		Swing		

Tony Johnson (Labor) resigned.

==== 1981 ====
1981 New South Wales state election: Riverstone
Party	Candidate	Votes	%	±%
Labor	Tony Johnson	18,139	71.1	
Liberal	Kenneth Jessup	6,267	24.6	
Democrats	John Cavenett	1,090	4.3	
Total formal votes		25,496	94.6	
Informal votes		1,452	5.4	
Turnout		26,948	90.1	
Two-party-preferred result
Labor	Tony Johnson	18,339	73.9	−5.7
Liberal	Kenneth Jessup	6,467	26.1	+5.7
Labor notional hold		Swing	−5.7	
