= Richmond Woodlands Important Bird Area =

Important Bird Area in New South Wales, Australia

Coordinates: 33°38′29″S 150°45′10″E

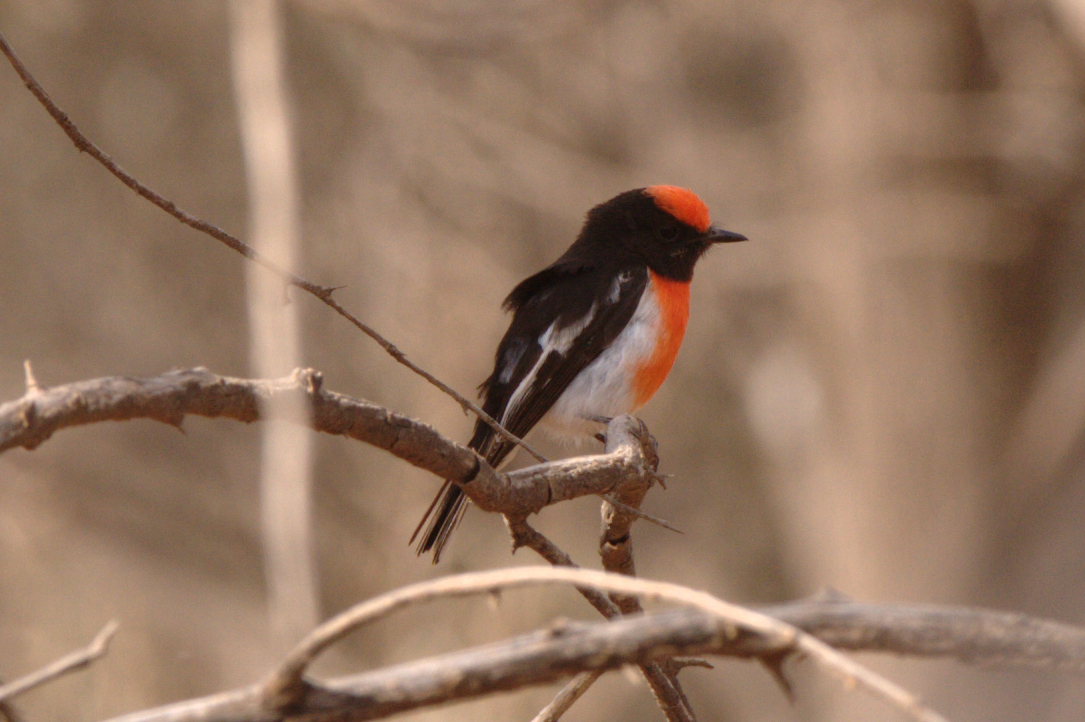
The IBA is an important site for red-capped robins in the Sydney region

The Richmond Woodlands comprise some 329 km^{2} of eucalypt woodland remnants close to Richmond, New South Wales, Australia. They lie at the foot of the Blue Mountains on the north-western fringe of the Sydney metropolitan area.

== Description ==
The Important Bird Area (IBA) boundary is defined by patches of habitat suitable for endangered regent honeyeaters and swift parrots, centred on the woodlands between the Agnes Banks, Windsor Downs and Castlereagh Nature Reserves, and extending south to Penrith and north-east to encompass Scheyville National Park. It is adjacent to the forested hills of the Greater Blue Mountains IBA.

== Flora and fauna ==
=== Plants ===
The woodlands are dominated by an overstorey of coastal grey box, narrow-leaved ironbark and forest red gum. Other trees include scribbly gum, narrow-leaved apple and the endangered Allocasuarina glareicola. There is an understorey of sweet bursaria, Pultenaea violacea and black sheoak, with groundcover of kangaroo grass, Echinopogan caespitosus, Astrida vagans, weeping grass and barbed-wire grass.

=== Birds ===
The site has been identified by BirdLife International as an IBA because it regularly supports significant numbers of regent honeyeaters and swift parrots, as well as many other woodland bird species. It holds one of the only two remaining populations of red-capped robins in the Sydney region.

=== Other animals ===
Mammals found in the IBA include sugar gliders, common brushtail possums, eastern grey kangaroos, bush rats and little red flying foxes. Over 20 species of reptiles have been recorded, including eastern long-necked turtles and eastern blue-tongued lizards. Green and golden bell frogs are present.
