= Electoral results for the district of Mount Druitt =

Election results for Mount Druitt, New South Wales, Australia

Mount Druitt, an electoral district of the Legislative Assembly in the Australian state of New South Wales, has had two incarnations, the first from 1971 to 1981, the second from 1991 to the present.

== Members ==
First incarnation (1971–1981)
Election	Member	Party
1971	Jim Southee	Labor
1973	Tony Johnson	Labor
1976	Tony Johnson	Labor
1978	Tony Johnson	Labor
Second incarnation (1991–present)
Election	Member	Party
1991	Richard Amery	Labor
1995	Richard Amery	Labor
1999	Richard Amery	Labor
2003	Richard Amery	Labor
2007	Richard Amery	Labor
2011	Richard Amery	Labor
2015	Edmond Atalla	Labor
2019	Edmond Atalla	Labor
2023	Edmond Atalla	Labor

== Election results ==
=== Elections in the 2020s ===
==== 2023 ====
2023 New South Wales state election: Mount Druitt
Party	Candidate	Votes	%	±%
Labor	Edmond Atalla	29,710	60.9	+2.0
Liberal	Kandathil Sunil Jayadevan	11,470	23.5	−2.6
Greens	Asm Morshed	4,173	8.6	+1.9
Animal Justice	Andrew Dudas	3,393	7.0	+7.0
Total formal votes		48,746	94.6	−0.3
Informal votes		2,759	5.4	+0.3
Turnout		51,505	82.6	−1.6
Two-party-preferred result
Labor	Edmond Atalla	32,606	72.4	+3.8
Liberal	Kandathil Sunil Jayadevan	12,435	27.6	−3.8
Labor hold		Swing	+3.8	

=== Elections in the 2010s ===
==== 2019 ====
2019 New South Wales state election: Mount Druitt
Party	Candidate	Votes	%	±%
Labor	Edmond Atalla	26,869	57.13	+0.49
Liberal	Mark Rusev	13,209	28.09	−1.12
Greens	Brent Robertson	3,231	6.87	+1.75
Christian Democrats	Samraat Grewal	2,204	4.69	−0.76
Conservatives	George Lang	1,518	3.23	+3.23
Total formal votes		47,031	95.12	+0.41
Informal votes		2,413	4.88	−0.41
Turnout		49,444	87.73	−0.75
Two-party-preferred result
Labor	Edmond Atalla	28,505	66.42	+0.97
Liberal	Mark Rusev	14,410	33.58	−0.97
Labor hold		Swing	+0.97	

==== 2015 ====
2015 New South Wales state election: Mount Druitt
Party	Candidate	Votes	%	±%
Labor	Edmond Atalla	25,460	56.6	+9.4
Liberal	Olivia Lloyd	13,128	29.2	−6.8
Christian Democrats	Josh Green	2,450	5.5	−2.9
Greens	Brent Robertson	2,300	5.1	−2.8
No Land Tax	Robyn Hamilton	1,610	3.6	+3.6
Total formal votes		44,948	94.7	+0.9
Informal votes		2,510	5.3	−0.9
Turnout		47,458	88.5	+0.7
Two-party-preferred result
Labor	Edmond Atalla	26,877	65.5	+9.5
Liberal	Olivia Lloyd	14,191	34.6	−9.5
Labor hold		Swing	+9.5	

==== 2011 ====
2011 New South Wales state election: Mount Druitt
Party	Candidate	Votes	%	±%
Labor	Richard Amery	20,037	48.0	−16.0
Liberal	Venus Priest	14,781	35.4	+15.8
Christian Democrats	Dave Vincent	3,519	8.4	+1.1
Greens	Debbie Robertson	3,380	8.1	+2.9
Total formal votes		41,717	94.6	−0.9
Informal votes		2,378	5.4	+0.9
Turnout		44,095	91.4	−0.8
Two-party-preferred result
Labor	Richard Amery	21,352	56.7	−18.6
Liberal	Venus Priest	16,286	43.3	+18.6
Labor hold		Swing	−18.6	

=== Elections in the 2000s ===
==== 2007 ====
2007 New South Wales state election: Mount Druitt
Party	Candidate	Votes	%	±%
Labor	Richard Amery	25,317	64.0	−2.0
Liberal	George Bilic	7,752	19.6	+1.6
Christian Democrats	Dave Vincent	2,908	7.4	+1.5
Greens	Debbie Robertson	2,040	5.2	+1.5
AAFI	John Newton	1,523	3.9	+1.4
Total formal votes		39,540	95.5	0.0
Informal votes		1,877	4.5	0.0
Turnout		41,417	92.2	
Two-party-preferred result
Labor	Richard Amery	27,201	75.4	−1.4
Liberal	George Bilic	8,892	24.6	+1.4
Labor hold		Swing	−1.4	

==== 2003 ====
2003 New South Wales state election: Mount Druitt
Party	Candidate	Votes	%	±%
Labor	Richard Amery	26,262	65.9	+6.3
Liberal	Allan Green	7,199	18.1	+2.1
Christian Democrats	Joseph Wyness	2,322	5.8	+1.3
Greens	Brent Robertson	1,485	3.7	+0.8
AAFI	Richard Newton	988	2.5	+0.9
Save Our Suburbs	Peter Kerr	811	2.0	+2.0
Democrats	Alicia Lantry	507	1.3	−2.5
Unity	John Uri	271	0.7	−2.1
Total formal votes		39,845	95.5	−1.0
Informal votes		1,899	4.5	+1.0
Turnout		41,744	91.9	
Two-party-preferred result
Labor	Richard Amery	27,500	76.8	+1.0
Liberal	Allan Green	8,314	23.2	−1.0
Labor hold		Swing	+1.0	

=== Elections in the 1990s ===
==== 1999 ====
1999 New South Wales state election: Mount Druitt
Party	Candidate	Votes	%	±%
Labor	Richard Amery	23,812	59.6	−7.0
Liberal	Allan Green	6,399	16.0	−7.6
One Nation	Nev Williams	3,458	8.7	+8.7
Christian Democrats	Joseph Wyness	1,812	4.5	+0.1
Democrats	Peter Reddy	1,517	3.8	+3.6
Greens	Bob Nolan	1,148	2.9	+2.9
Unity	Leila Toal	1,133	2.8	+2.8
AAFI	Robert Girvan	651	1.6	+1.6
Total formal votes		39,930	96.5	+3.7
Informal votes		1,467	3.5	−3.7
Turnout		41,397	93.0	
Two-party-preferred result
Labor	Richard Amery	26,038	75.8	+3.7
Liberal	Allan Green	8,322	24.2	−3.7
Labor hold		Swing	+3.7	

==== 1995 ====
1995 New South Wales state election: Mount Druitt
Party	Candidate	Votes	%	±%
Labor	Richard Amery	21,775	61.4	+6.6
Liberal	Jennifer Mackenzie	10,192	28.8	−0.2
Call to Australia	Joe Wyness	1,775	5.0	+1.8
Independent	Ivor F	1,706	4.8	+2.7
Total formal votes		35,448	93.0	+7.5
Informal votes		2,665	7.0	−7.5
Turnout		38,113	93.5	
Two-party-preferred result
Labor	Richard Amery	22,759	66.7	+3.7
Liberal	Jennifer Mackenzie	11,351	33.3	−3.7
Labor hold		Swing	+3.7	

==== 1991 ====
1991 New South Wales state election: Mount Druitt
Party	Candidate	Votes	%	±%
Labor	Richard Amery	15,848	54.8	−2.9
Liberal	Michael Sainsbury	8,362	28.9	−9.8
Independent EFF	Joe Bryant	2,095	7.2	+4.2
Call to Australia	Mavis Atha	915	3.2	+3.2
Democrats	Dick Pike	759	2.6	+2.6
Independent	Ivor F	608	2.1	+2.1
Citizens Electoral Council	Gloria Wood	323	1.1	+1.1
Total formal votes		28,910	85.5	−10.4
Informal votes		4,896	14.5	+10.4
Turnout		33,806	93.5	
Two-party-preferred result
Labor	Richard Amery	16,873	63.0	+3.7
Liberal	Michael Sainsbury	9,891	37.0	−3.7
Labor notional hold		Swing	+3.7	

Mount Druit was a new seat with a notional Labor majority.

District recreated

==== 1981–1991 ====
District abolished

=== Elections in the 1970s ===
==== 1978 ====
1978 New South Wales state election: Mount Druitt
Party	Candidate	Votes	%	±%
Labor	Tony Johnson	25,055	77.9	+10.5
Liberal	Thomas Rands	4,726	14.7	−17.9
Communist	Victoria Wootten	2,391	7.4	+7.4
Total formal votes		32,172	96.5	+0.1
Informal votes		1,150	3.5	−0.1
Turnout		33,322	93.4	−0.8
Two-party-preferred result
Labor	Tony Johnson	26,090	81.1	+13.8
Liberal	Thomas Rands	6,082	18.9	−13.8
Labor hold		Swing	+13.8	

==== 1976 ====
1976 New South Wales state election: Mount Druitt
Party	Candidate	Votes	%	±%
Labor	Tony Johnson	19,089	67.4	+9.6
Liberal	James McCrudden	9,255	32.6	+3.5
Total formal votes		28,344	96.6	+0.7
Informal votes		1,008	3.4	−0.7
Turnout		29,352	94.2	+2.7
Labor hold		Swing	+4.0	

==== 1973 ====
1973 New South Wales state election: Mount Druitt
Party	Candidate	Votes	%	±%
Labor	Tony Johnson	13,423	57.8	−7.2
Liberal	Neiven Harrison	6,765	29.1	−5.9
Independent	Patrick Chalker	2,196	9.5	+9.5
Democratic Labor	Francesco Rea	835	3.6	+3.6
Total formal votes		23,219	95.9	
Informal votes		991	4.1	
Turnout		24,210	91.5	
Two-party-preferred result
Labor	Tony Johnson	14,688	63.3	−1.7
Liberal	Neiven Harrison	8,531	36.7	+1.7
Labor hold		Swing	−1.7	

==== 1971 ====
1971 New South Wales state election: Mount Druitt
Party	Candidate	Votes	%	±%
Labor	Jim Southee	16,771	65.0	+7.4
Liberal	John Park	9,022	35.0	−7.4
Total formal votes		25,793	95.7	
Informal votes		1,167	4.3	
Turnout		26,960	92.7	
Labor notional hold		Swing	+7.4	
