= Windsor Downs Nature Reserve =

Protected area in New South Wales, Australia

- IUCN category Ia (strict nature reserve)
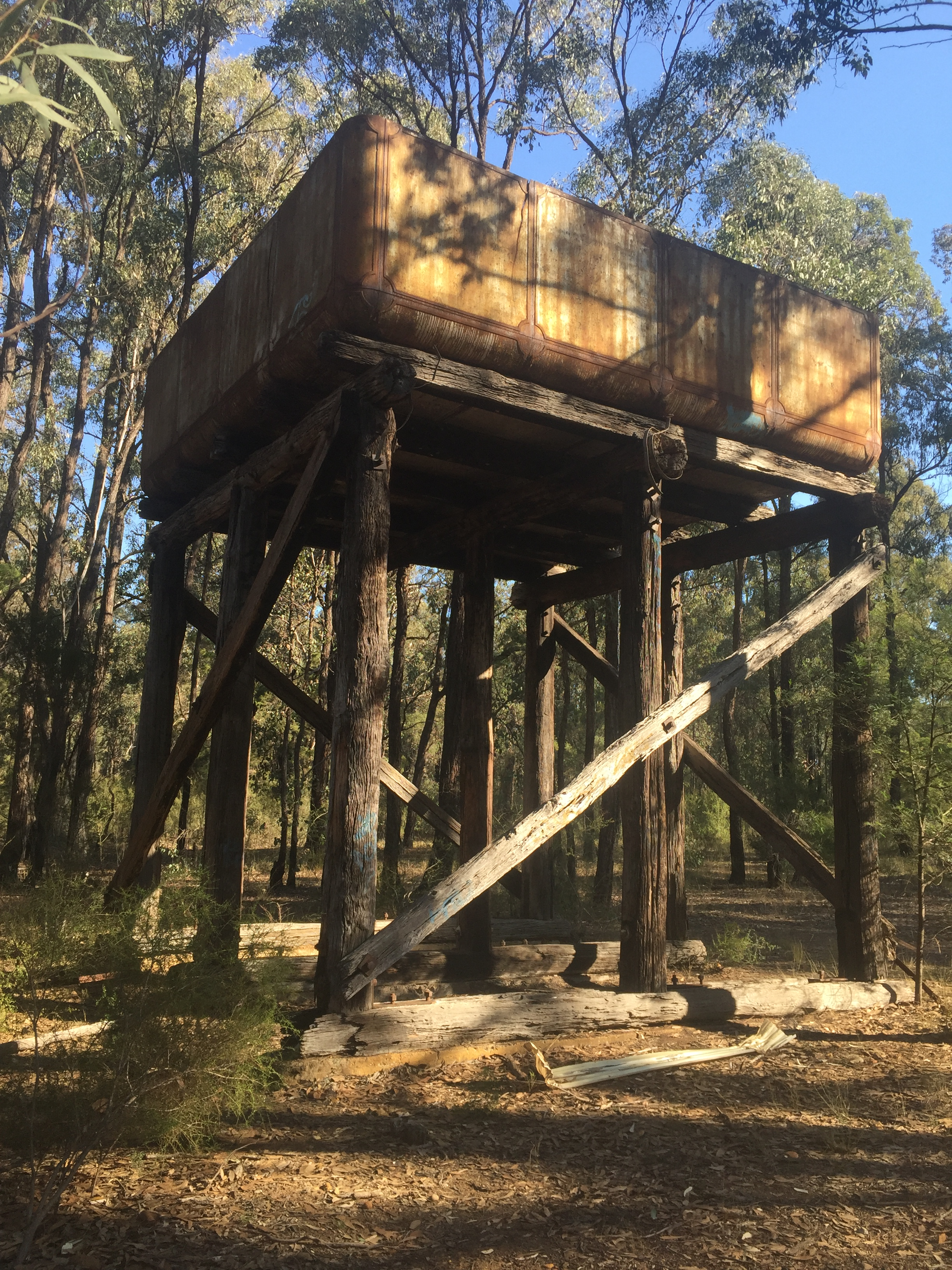
- The old meatworks water tower in the Windsor Downs Nature Reserve

- Location within New South Wales
- Location: New South Wales, Windsor Downs
- Coordinates: 33°38′59″S 150°48′09″E
- Area: 3.64 km^{2} (1.41 sq mi)
- Established: 7 September 1990
- Visitors: 10000 (in 1999)
- Governing body: NSW National Parks and Wildlife Service
- Website: www.nationalparks.nsw.gov.au/visit-a-park/parks/windsor-downs-nature-reserve

Windsor Downs Nature Reserve is a protected area established in 1990 by the Government of New South Wales. The nature reserve, which occupies an area of 364 hectares (900 acres) between Windsor Downs and Bligh Park, was established on land formerly owned by the Riverstone Meatworks for the grazing of cattle.

It is one of the last remains of the Cumberland Plain Woodland, an endangered ecological community exclusive to what is now the western suburbs of Sydney. The nature reserve contains a wide range of flora including a number of Eucalypts as well as the threatened Persoonia nutans and Dillwynia tenuifolia as well as hosting a range of native fauna, including endangered species such as the regent honeyeater.

== History and prior land use ==
Windsor Downs Nature Reserve is situated on the land of the Darug tribe. There are known to be Aboriginal campsites in the reserve and a number of stone tools have been found.

The land was occupied by the Riverstone Meatworks for over 100 years, during which time it was cleared and used for grazing cattle. Many of the structures from this period, including the old water tower and concrete water troughs are still standing.

In the late 1980s, shortly before their closure, the Meatworks sold the land to New South Wales National Parks and Wildlife, who opened the reserve as a state park in 1990. The nature reserve was affected by a major fire on 10 September 2013. An investigation found that the fire was caused by a power line being blown down by strong winds.

== Flora ==
The reserve's flora is largely determined by its varying soil types. Open forest environment dominated by iron-barks such as Eucalyptus fibrosa and Eucalyptus sideroxylon occur on the clay-based soils, while sandier soils host woodlands of Eucalyptus sclerophylla. Meanwhile, sub-mature Hakeas grow on former grazing land in the reserve.

Additionally, the reserve is home to a number of rare and threatened flora, including Dillwynia tenuifolia, Pultenaea parviflora, Persoonia nutans and Grevillea juniperina.

== Fauna ==
=== Mammals ===
The nature reserve hosts a healthy population of the eastern grey kangaroo (Macropus Giganteus) as well as being home to swamp wallabies, sugar gliders, common brushtail possums and common ringtail possums.

=== Birds ===
The nature reserve is reported to contain at least 68 bird species, including yellow-tailed black cockatoos, sulphur-crested cockatoos and laughing kookaburras. Notably, the endangered regent honeyeater is known to reside in the reserve as well as possibly one of the few populations of red-capped robins left in Sydney.

=== Reptiles ===
The nature reserve is home to a number of reptiles, including goannas, eastern brown snakes, red-bellied black snakes and blue-tongued lizards.

== See also ==
- Protected areas of New South Wales
- Nature reserve (Australia)
