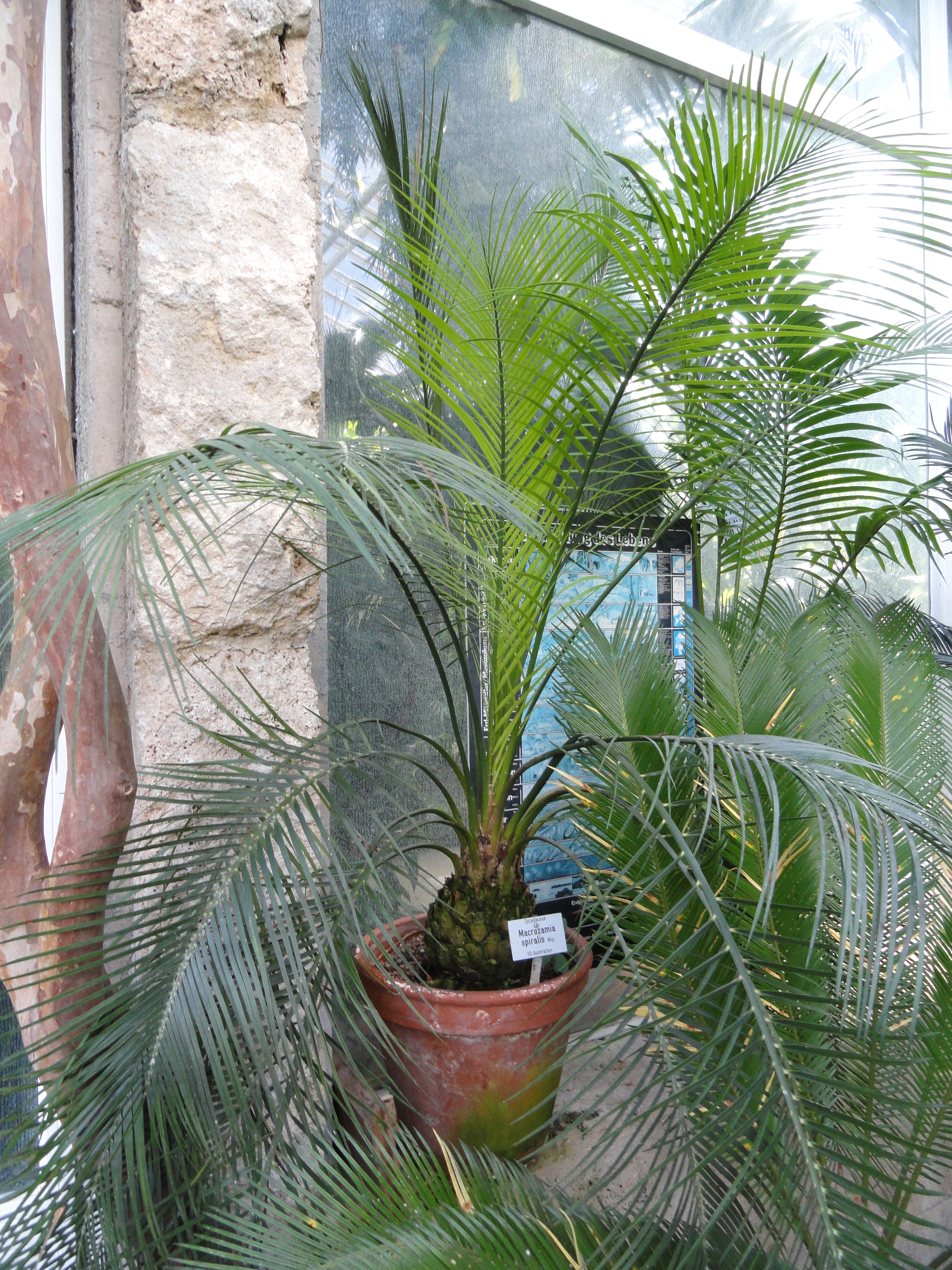
- Macrozamia spiralis specimen in the Botanischer Garten München-Nymphenburg, Munich, Germany

Conservation status
- Endangered (IUCN 3.1)

Scientific classification
- Kingdom: Plantae
- Clade: Tracheophytes
- Clade: Gymnospermae
- Division: Cycadophyta
- Class: Cycadopsida
- Order: Cycadales
- Family: Zamiaceae
- Genus: Macrozamia
- Species: M. spiralis

Binomial name
- Macrozamia spiralis (Salisb.) Miq.
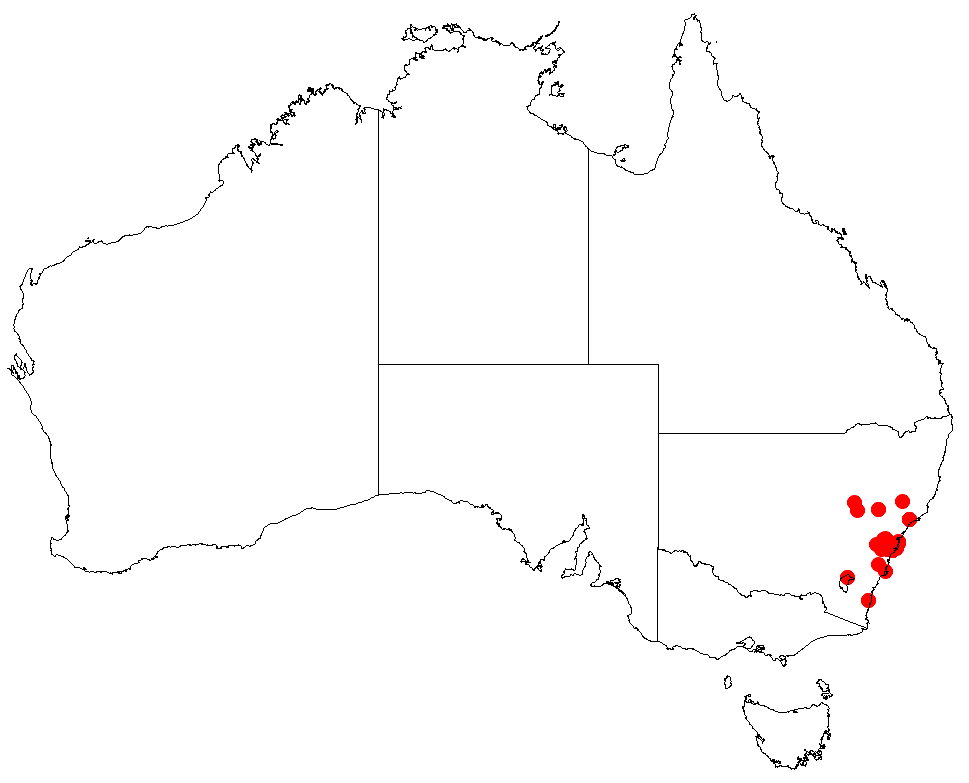
- Occurrence data from AVH

Synonyms
- Macrozamia corallipes Hook.f. Zamia spiralis Salisb.

= Macrozamia spiralis =

Species of cycad

Macrozamia spiralis is a species of cycad in the family Zamiaceae. It is endemic to New South Wales in eastern Australia, where it is found in sclerophyll forest on low-nutrient soils. Plants generally lack a trunk and have 2–12 leaves that range up to 100 cm (40 in) in length.

== Taxonomy ==
Richard Anthony Salisbury described this species as Zamia spiralis in 1796, from a collection made somewhere in the vicinity of Port Jackson (Sydney); however, no type specimen is extant. Dutch botanist Friedrich Anton Wilhelm Miquel gave it its current name in 1842. Meanwhile, Joseph Dalton Hooker described M. corallipes from a plate in 1872.

For many years, the name M. spiralis was applied to the large common cycad from the Sydney region, while its smaller relative was known as M. corallipes. In 1959, New South Wales Herbarium botanist Lawrie Johnson examined the species descriptions and determined that Salisbury's original description was in fact of the smaller species, and renamed the familiar burrawang as Macrozamia communis.

== Description ==
This cycad is acaulescent; the 8–20 cm (3.2–8 in) diameter stem does not generally grow above ground level. Plants have 2–12 leaves that range from 35 to 100 cm (14–40 in) in length. Each compound frond has 45–120 simple pinnae that are 12–20 cm (4.5–8 in) long at the leaf's greatest width. Each pinna is 0.5–1 cm (0.2–0.4 in) wide. The rachis of the leaf is often twisted 180 degrees, sometimes up to 360 degrees, though sometimes not at all. A male plant develops 1 to 4 male (or pollen-bearing) cones, which are fusiform (spindle-shaped), and measure 15–20 cm (6–8 in) high by 5–6 cm (2-2.4 in) wide. The female plant produces a single oval female (seed) cone, which is 12–20 cm (4.5–8 in) high and 6–9 cm (2.4–3.5 in) wide. The orange to red fleshy seeds have been reported to be ripe in April and May. Plants do not reproduce until 10 to 20 years of age and are thought to live over 60 years. They regrow from the ground after bushfire.

Seedlings of Macrozamia spiralis have a tuber and coralloid roots that rise up above the ground containing cyanobacteria. These exist in a symbiotic relationship with their cycad host by nitrogen fixation. Field work done on roots of 74 cycads from diverse genera in 2010 showed that the relationship between cycad and cyanobacterium species is not exclusive; the most common genera of cyanobacteria isolated from cycads were those of Nostoc (which was isolated from M. spiralis) and Calothrix.

== Distribution and habitat ==
Macrozamia spiralis is found in central New South Wales, from Dunedoo and the Goulburn River valley eastwards over the Blue Mountains and into the Sydney Basin south to Waterfall, and Wallacia, and north to Maroota and Putty. Conservation areas that it is protected in include Werakata National Park, Windsor Downs Nature Reserve, Agnes Banks Nature Reserve, and Castlereagh Nature Reserve, where it is common. Scattered plants grow on clay, sandy or gravelly low-nutrient soils in sclerophyll forest, under such trees as narrow-leaved apple (Angophora bakeri) and broad-leaved red ironbark (Eucalyptus fibrosa). Macrozamia spiralis was rated as endangered in 2003.

== Cultivation ==
Macrozamia spiralis is suitable for growing in pots or in the ground, though requires good drainage and benefits from extra water in dry periods. It can be grown under established trees. It can be propagated by seed, though germination takes 12 to 18 months.

== Uses ==
The plant has been used to produce alcohol, adhesive pastes, and laundry starch.
