= Angus, New South Wales =

Angus
- Suburb
- Interactive map of Angus
- Coordinates: 33°40′32″S 150°50′03″E
- Country: Australia
- State: New South Wales
- City: Sydney
- Location: 41 km (25 mi) north-west of Sydney CBD
- Established: 2020

Government
  - State electorate: Riverstone
  - Federal division: Chifley

Area
  - Total: 7.64 km^{2} (2.95 sq mi)
- Elevation: 25 m (82 ft)

Population
  - Total: 384 (SAL 2021)
- Postcode: 2765
Suburbs around Angus
Windsor Downs	Vineyard	Richards
Marsden Park	Angus	Richards
Marsden Park	Marsden Park	Marsden Park

Angus is a suburb of Sydney in the state of New South Wales, Australia. Angus is north-west of Sydney City in the local government area of Blacktown.

== History ==
Angus is situated in the Darug traditional Aboriginal country. Angus was approved as a suburb on 7 September 2020 and gazetted on 6 November 2020. Prior to the suburb's creation, the area was part of Marsden Park and Riverstone.

The origin of the suburb name is from the name of a former Shire President of the Blacktown Shire Council in 1917–1920.
