= 1983 Riverstone state by-election =

Election result for Riverstone, New South Wales, Australia

A by-election was held for the New South Wales Legislative Assembly seat of Riverstone on 22 October 1983. It was triggered by the resignation of Tony Johnson (Labor).

The Riverstone by-election was held the same day as the by-elections for Kogarah, Maroubra and Marrickville. All were safe Labor seats and while there was a swing against Labor in each seat (7.2% to 11.8%), all were retained by Labor.

== Dates ==
Date	Event
20 July 1983	Tony Johnson resigned.
23 September 1983	Writ of election issued by the Speaker of the Legislative Assembly and close of electoral rolls.
30 September 1983	Day of nomination
22 October 1983	Polling day
11 November 1983	Return of writ

== Result ==
1983 Riverstone by-election Saturday 22 October
Party	Candidate	Votes	%	±%
Labor	Richard Amery	12,541	59.7	−11.4
Liberal	Kenneth Jessup	7,583	36.1	+11.5
Independent	Winston Brass	897	4.3	
Total formal votes		21,021	97.2	
Informal votes		609	2.8	
Turnout		21,630	69.3	
Labor hold		Swing		

== See also ==
- Electoral results for the district of Riverstone
- List of New South Wales state by-elections
