= South Windsor =

South Windsor may refer to:

- South Windsor, Connecticut, a town in Connecticut, USA
- South Windsor, New South Wales, a suburb of Sydney, Australia
- South Windsor, Maine, in Kennebec County, USA
