= Grantham Farm =

- Suburb
- Interactive map of Grantham Farm
- Coordinates: 33°39′36″S 150°52′00″E
- Country: Australia
- State: New South Wales
- City: Sydney
- Location: 36 km (22 mi) north-west of Sydney CBD
- Established: 2020

Government
  - State electorate: Riverstone
  - Federal division: Greenway

Area
  - Total: 3.62 km^{2} (1.40 sq mi)
- Elevation: 33 m (108 ft)

Population
  - Total: 3,669 (SAL 2021)
- Postcode: 2765
Suburbs around Grantham Farm
Riverstone	Vineyard	Vineyard
Riverstone	Grantham Farm	Box Hill
Riverstone	Rouse Hill	Box Hill

Grantham Farm is a suburb of Sydney, in the state of New South Wales, Australia. Grantham Farm is located in north-west Sydney in the local government area of Blacktown.

== History ==
Grantham Farm was gazetted on 6 November 2020. It was previously a part of Riverstone.

The suburb is named after the Grantham Farm Estate, which was a subdivision of the original land grant of 'Riverstone'. The land grant was given to Lieutenant-Colonel Maurice Charles O'Connell by Governor Lachlan Macquarie in 1810. The estate contained a 6-bedroom cottage and other outbuildings as well as vineyards.

== Demographics ==
According to the 2021 census of population, there were 3,669 people in Grantham Farm. 53.9% of people were born in Australia and 52.8% of people spoke only English at home. The most common responses for religion in Grantham Farm were Catholic 25.8%, No Religion 19.7% and Hinduism 17.3%.
