= John Aquilina =

Australian politician

The Honourable John Aquilina AM

28th Speaker of the New South Wales Legislative Assembly
- In office 29 April 2003 – 7 May 2007
- Premier: Bob Carr; Morris Iemma
- Preceded by: John Murray
- Succeeded by: Richard Torbay

Minister for Fair Trading and Minister for Land and Water Conservation
- In office 21 November 2001 – 2 April 2003
- Preceded by: John Watkins (Fair Trading); Richard Amery (Land and Water Conservation)
- Succeeded by: Reba Meagher (Fair Trading); Craig Knowles (Natural Resources)

Minister for Education and Training
- In office 4 April 1995 – 21 November 2001
- Preceded by: Virginia Chadwick (Education, Training and Youth Affairs)
- Succeeded by: John Watkins

Minister Assisting the Premier on Youth Affairs
- In office 4 April 1995 – 8 April 1999

Minister for Youth and Community Services and Assistant Minister for Ethnic Affairs
- In office 4 July 1986 – 21 March 1988
- Preceded by: Peter Anderson
- Succeeded by: Virginia Chadwick (Family and Community Services); Terry Metherell (Education and Youth Affairs)

Minister for Natural Resources
- In office 6 February 1986 – 4 July 1986
- Preceded by: Janice Crosio
- Succeeded by: Janice Crosio (Water Resources); Jack Hallam (Forests)

Member of the New South Wales Legislative Assembly for Member for Riverstone
- In office 25 May 1991 – 26 March 2011
- Preceded by: Richard Amery
- Succeeded by: Kevin Conolly

Member of the New South Wales Legislative Assembly for Member for Blacktown
- In office 19 September 1981 – 3 May 1991
- Preceded by: Gordon Barnier
- Succeeded by: Pam Allan

Personal details
- Born: John Joseph Aquilina; 12 March 1950 (age 76) Malta
- Party: Labor Party
- Spouse(s): Anne (dec'd); Ann (m 13 May 2006)
- Children: Three; Bede and Jeremy (m); Bridget (f)

John Joseph Aquilina AM (born 12 March 1950, in Malta), an Australian former politician, is a former member of the New South Wales Legislative Assembly representing the electorate of Blacktown between 1981 and 1991 and the electorate of Riverstone between 1991 and 2011 for the Labor Party.

Between 1986 and 1988 and again between 1995 and 2003, he served in a range of ministerial portfolios including Minister for Natural Resources and Minister for Youth and Community Services in the Wran and Unsworth Labor governments and Minister for Education and Training, Minister for Fair Trading, and Minister for Land and Water Conservation in the Carr Labor government.

From 2003 to 2007, he was Speaker of the NSW Legislative Assembly, and was Leader of the House from 2007 until his retirement in 2011.

In 2011, Aquilina re-acquired citizenship of Malta and served as Malta's Ambassador for various countries post his retirement from Australian politics.

== Early years and background ==
In 1956, aged 6 years, Aquilina migrated from Malta to Australia with his parents and younger brother. Studying at the University of Sydney, Aquilina completed a Bachelor of Arts and a Diploma of Education in 1971 and was a member of the University of Sydney Regiment between 1968 and 1970, although did not see active duty. He commenced teaching at Oaklands Central School as a high school teacher, before returning to Sydney. Whilst at university in 1970, Aquilina joined the Blacktown Branch of the Australian Labor Party. In 1974, he became an Australian citizen.

In 1977, Aquilina was elected as an alderman to Blacktown City Council representing the Labor Party up until 1983; and went on to become Mayor of the Council between 1977 and 1981. In 1979, he was appointed a member of the Ethnic Affairs Commission of New South Wales (now the Community Relations Commission for a Multicultural New South Wales) and at various times has held positions with the State Records Authority (2003–2006); Sydney Grammar School Board of Trustees; appointed a Fellow of the Senate of the University of Sydney; an Honorary Associate of the University of Sydney Graduate School of Government; a member of the advisory board of the Sydney Conservatorium of Music; a Life Member of the Royal Institute for Deaf and Blind Children and a member of Blacktown City Lions Club.

Aquilina married Anne Michelle Sutcliffe in 1977, and together they had two sons and one daughter. Following the death of Anne Sutcliffe in 2003, he remarried Ann Elizabeth Moran in 2006.

== New South Wales political career ==
Elected as Member for Blacktown in 1981, Aquilina held a number of junior portfolios including chair of various committees before being appointed Minister for Natural Resources in the Wran government in 1986. In that same year, following the retirement of Wran and Unsworth becoming Premier, Aquilina was appointed Minister for Youth and Community Services and Assistant Minister for Ethnic Affairs. He held these portfolios up until the 1988 state election when Labor lost government to the Greiner-Murray Liberal-National coalition.

In opposition, Aquilina held the shadow portfolios of Education and Training, Youth and Ethnic Affairs.

In 1990, following an electoral redistribution, a new electorate of Mount Druitt was created. Richard Amery moved to contest this new safe Labor seat. Aquilina decided to contest Amery's old seat of Riverstone; and Pam Allan contest Aquilina's old seat of Blacktown. Aquilina was successful at the 1991 state election and has subsequently defended the seat at the 1995, 1999, 2003 and 2007 elections.

Following the election of the Carr Labor government in 1995, Aquilina was appointed Minister for Education and Training (a position he held for over six years) and also Minister Assisting the Premier on Youth Affairs (over four years). In 2001, he was appointed Minister for Land and Water Conservation and Minister for Fair Trading. Aquilina held both these position until the retirement of John Murray, when he assumed the position of Speaker of the New South Wales Legislative Assembly in 2003.

After the 2007 state election, there was considerable political pressure for the appointment of an independent Speaker. Aquilina stood aside in favour of independent Member for Northern Tablelands Richard Torbay.

In 2007, he became Leader of the House. On 25 October 2010, Aquilina announced that he would not be contesting the next state election.

=== Position on LGBT Rights ===
In 1982 John Aquilina wrote in the Daily Mirror that it was his electorate's and his personal view that homosexuality should not be decriminalised in New South Wales and he would vote against it in any case, contrary to the position of his party. Gay rights activists Garry Wotherspoon and Fabian LoSchiavo confronted him with a petition with 132 against his stance, which was shown on ABC's Four Corners programme. Nevertheless, on May 22, 1984, Aquilina voted along party lines for the Neville Wran private member's bill that decriminalised same-sex relationships. Two years after the 1995 New South Wales state election, as Minister for Education, Aquilina abruptly shelved implementation of LGBT+ school reforms that had been initiated by his Liberal Party predecessor, Virginia Chadwick, despite their having been developed in consultation with the New South Wales Department of Education, the Board of Studies, the New South Wales Parents and Citizens Association, the New South Wales Police Force gay liaison service, the New South Wales Anti-discrimination Board and the Gay and Lesbian Teachers and Students Association. In 2003 however, while Speaker of the House, Aquilina voted in favour of equalising the Age of Consent, regardless of gender or sexual orientation and in 2010 he voted in favour of the Relationships Register Bill, also along party lines.

=== Controversy ===
In March 2010, it was reported that Aquilina's 25–year old son, Jeremy, was charged with five counts of sexual assault and one count of indecency on a 22–year old woman in a park in St Clair in western Sydney.

On 10 April 2001 John Aquilina raised the issue in parliament of a foiled plot by a high school student to replicate the Columbine High School Massacre. He alleged that the student's diary contained plans to kill fellow students and teachers. His staff embellished the story, telling reporters the student had access to a gun. On this, the Police Commissioner contradicted Aquilina's version of events, and the boy's family subsequently threatened to sue the Government.

Aquilina was later the subject of an Independent Commission Against Corruption (ICAC) investigation that explored possible false statements to the media and political interference in police procedures. The investigation concluded in August 2001 and found no evidence of corrupt conduct. However, Aquilina relinquished the Education and Training portfolio in late 2001 and was shifted to the Ministries of Land and Water Conservation, and Fair Trading.

=== Railway overpass ===
Riverstone is one of the few suburbs left in the Sydney region with a level crossing with old-fashioned boom gates. On 28 February 2008, Aquilina made a private members statement, reaffirming the Labor Party's commitment to build a railbridge overpass at the current level crossing at Garfield Road East, Riverstone. There has been much scepticism whether the bridge will be built, particularly from the conservative side of politics, as Aqulina concludes in his speech "... by stating emphatically once again that the Government will go ahead with the elimination of the level crossing and the construction of the overpass despite the claims by the Member for Hawkesbury" As at 18 November 2026, the railway overpass is yet to be constructed with planning still under way.

== Diplomatic career ==
- November 2013 to December 2015, Malta's High Commissioner to India, Bangladesh and Ambassador to Nepal.
- December 2015 to 2023, Malta's Ambassador to China.
- May 2022 to present, Malta's Ambassador to Brazil.

New post	Ambassador of Malta to Brazil; 2022–present	Incumbent
New post	Ambassador of Malta to Chile; 2024–present	Incumbent
Preceded by Clifford Borg-Marks	Ambassador of Malta to China; 2015–2022	Succeeded by John Busuttil
Parliament of New South Wales
Preceded by Richard Face	Father of the Parliament; 2003–2011; Served alongside: Ian Armstrong (2003-2007)	Succeeded by Richard Amery
Civic offices
Preceded by Peter Shinnick	Mayor of Blacktown; 1977–1981	Succeeded by James Lynch
New South Wales Legislative Assembly
Preceded by Richard Face	Father of the Assembly; 2003–2011; Served alongside: Ian Armstrong (2003-2007)	Succeeded by Richard Amery
Preceded by Gordon Barnier	Member for Blacktown; 1981–1991	Succeeded by Pam Allan
Preceded by Richard Amery	Member for Riverstone; 1991–2011	Succeeded by Kevin Conolly
Preceded by John Murray	Speaker of the New South Wales Legislative Assembly; 2003–2007	Succeeded by Richard Torbay
Political offices
Preceded by Janice Crosio	Minister for Natural Resources; 1986	Succeeded by Janice Crosio as Minister for Water Resources
Preceded by Janice Crosio	Minister for Natural Resources; 1986	Succeeded by Jack Hallam as Minister for Forests
Preceded by Peter Anderson	Minister for Youth and Community Services; 1986–1988	Succeeded by Virginia Chadwick as Minister for Family and Community Services
Preceded by Peter Anderson	Minister for Youth and Community Services; 1986–1988	Succeeded by Terry Metherell as Minister for Education and Youth Affairs
Preceded by Virginia Chadwick as Minister for Education, Training and Youth Affairs	Minister for Education and Training; 1995–2001	Succeeded by John Watkins
Preceded by Richard Amery	Minister for Land and Water Conservation; 2001–2003	Succeeded by Craig Knowles as Minister for Natural Resources
Preceded by John Watkins	Minister for Fair Trading; 2001–2003	Succeeded by Reba Meagher
