= Bligh Park =

- Suburb
- Interactive map of Bligh Park
- Coordinates: 33°38′18″S 150°47′53″E
- Country: Australia
- State: New South Wales
- City: Sydney
- LGA: City of Hawkesbury
- Location: 58 km (36 mi) NW of Sydney CBD

Government
  - State electorate: Hawkesbury
  - Federal division: Macquarie
- Elevation: 25 m (82 ft)

Population
  - Total: 6,220 (2021 census)
- Postcode: 2756
Suburbs around Bligh Park
South Windsor	South Windsor	Mulgrave
Londonderry	Bligh Park	Mulgrave
Londonderry	Berkshire Park	Windsor Downs

Bligh Park is a suburb of Sydney, in the state of New South Wales, Australia located near Windsor and Richmond. Bligh Park is located 58 kilometres west of the Sydney central business district, in the local government area of the City of Hawkesbury and is part of the Greater Western Sydney region. The postcode for Bligh Park is 2756, which also covers the suburbs of Windsor, South Windsor, Windsor Downs and Ebenezer.

== History ==
Bligh Park is named after William Bligh, as at the time of the Rum Rebellion the Hawkesbury settlers supported the then-deposed governor, while streets in the suburb are named after ships and people on the First Fleet.

In 1988, developer AVJennings built Bligh Park and it would later be noticed as a suburb.

== Landmarks ==
Bligh Park has a small local shopping centre which includes a grocery store, a takeaway store, a real estate, a butcher, a chemist, a bakery, a pizza shop and a Doctors Surgery. Bligh Park is also the home to Bligh Park Primary School, which opened in 1990. Bligh Park has two large sporting reserves, Bounty Reserve and Colonial Reserve. Both reserves are used by local sporting clubs, including Bligh Park Cricket Club, Bligh Park FC and Windsor Wolves Junior Rugby League Club.

== Demographics ==
According to the 2021 census of Population, there were 6,220 people in Bligh Park.

- Aboriginal and Torres Strait Islander people made up 6.9% of the population.
- 86.0% of people were born in Australia. The next most common countries of birth were England 2.6% and New Zealand 1.3%.
- 91.3% of people only spoke English at home.
- The most common responses for religion were No Religion 37.2%, Catholic 27.9% and Anglican 16.8%.

== Notable residents ==
- Ashton Irwin, drummer of Australian pop-rock band 5 Seconds of Summer.
