= Mulgrave, New South Wales =

Mulgrave
- Suburb
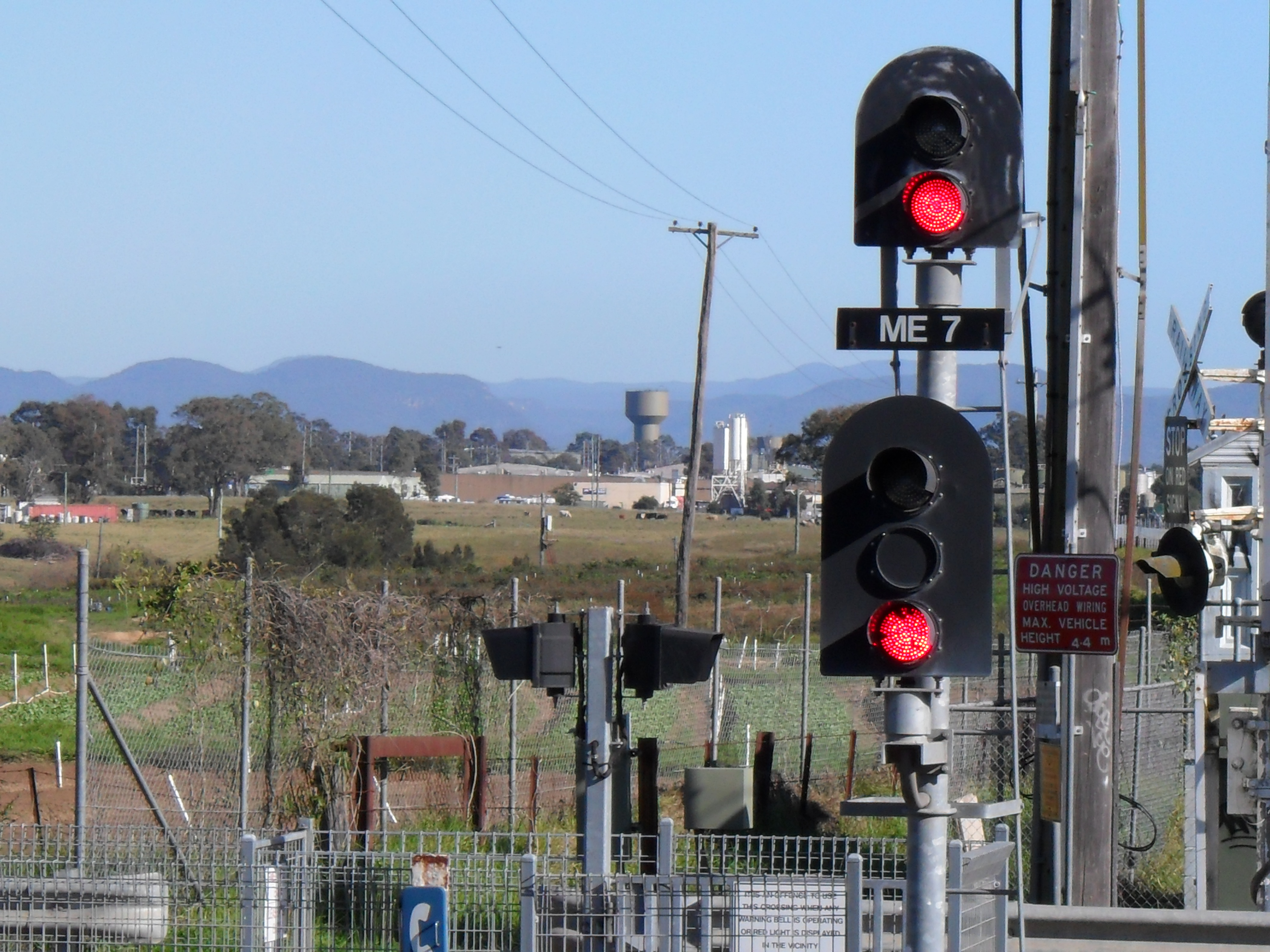
- View towards Windsor and Blue Mountains, from Mulgrave railway station

- Interactive map of Mulgrave
- Country: Australia
- State: New South Wales
- LGA: City of Hawkesbury
- Location: 53.5 km (33.2 mi) from Sydney CBD

Government
  - State electorate: Hawkesbury
  - Federal division: Macquarie
- Elevation: 15 m (49 ft)

Population
  - Total: 78 (2021 census)
- Postcode: 2756
Suburbs around Mulgrave
Windsor	Windsor	McGraths Hill
South Windsor and Bligh Park	Mulgrave	Oakville
Windsor Downs	Marsden Park	Vineyard

Mulgrave is a suburb in the north west of Sydney in New South Wales, Australia. It is a predominantly industrial and commercial area.

== History ==
The district was settled in the period between 1794 and 1800. Lieutenant-Governor Grose named the locality 'Mulgrave Place' honouring Constantine Phipps, the second Baron Mulgrave, who had died in 1792. Baron Mulgrave had been an English naval officer and statesman and a colleague and friend of Joseph Banks.

== Transport ==
Mulgrave railway station is on the Richmond railway line. It is four stations from the terminus station at Richmond. Mulgrave station is 53 kilometres (33 mi) from Sydney's Central Station, which takes approximately 1 hour 6 minutes to travel by train during peak hour. The station along with the arrival of a steam train features in The Seekers at Home TV special, 1968. Filmed as the setting for the song "Angeline is always Friday", steam hauled services ceased to operate shortly afterwards.

== Demographics ==
Mulgrave's population is 78 (2021 census). It had a median weekly household income of $1,812, which is above the national average of $1,746.
