= Kacor Australia =

Australian-American land development company

Kacor Australia Properties
- Formerly: Kaiser Aetna Australia (1970–78)
- Type: Private
- Industry: Land subdivision Home construction
- Founded: 30 June 1970
- Founder: Kaiser Steel; Aetna Life & Casualty Company
- Defunct: 27 February 1992
- Key people: D. McLellan (Managing director); R. Holloway (General manager)
- Divisions: Macquarie Builders

Kacor Australia Properties (formerly Kaiser Aetna Australia) was a private Australian-ran, American-owned land development and home building company active between 1970 and 1981.

== Early history ==
=== Background ===
United States materials company Kaiser Aluminum founded its realestate operations during the post-war boom, and quickly rose to prominence as an international developer of large-scale industrial, commercial, and residential projects. In 1969, it became a joint venture with the Aetna Life & Casualty Company under the banner of Kaiser Aetna.

=== Kaiser Aetna Jennings ===
Promo for Kaiser Aetna Jennings, 1970

Kaiser Aetna expanded into the Australian property market in 1970 through a brief, high-profile partnership with AV Jennings, which was the country's largest home builder at the time. The consortium, which became known as Kaiser Aetna Jennings, set out to deliver "creative and balanced community developments" on land owned by Jennings across Australia. It reportedly controlled over 660 hectares of land in the country (roughly equivalent to the size of two Central Parks). Kaiser Aetna Jennings's first major undertaking was a series of masterplanned industrial estates in Melbourne and Sydney.

However, as construction progressed on these developments, it became apparent that Kaiser Aetna and Jennings had clashing philosophies when it came to real estate. An Age columnist described Kaiser Aetna's strategy as buying, developing and "getting out as soon as possible", in contrast to Jennings's passive approach of thoroughly assessing its investments. These managerial differences lead to Jennings pulling out of the venture less than a year in, citing they would prefer to approach property development with Kaiser Aetna on a project-by-project basis, rather than as a joint owner of a business.

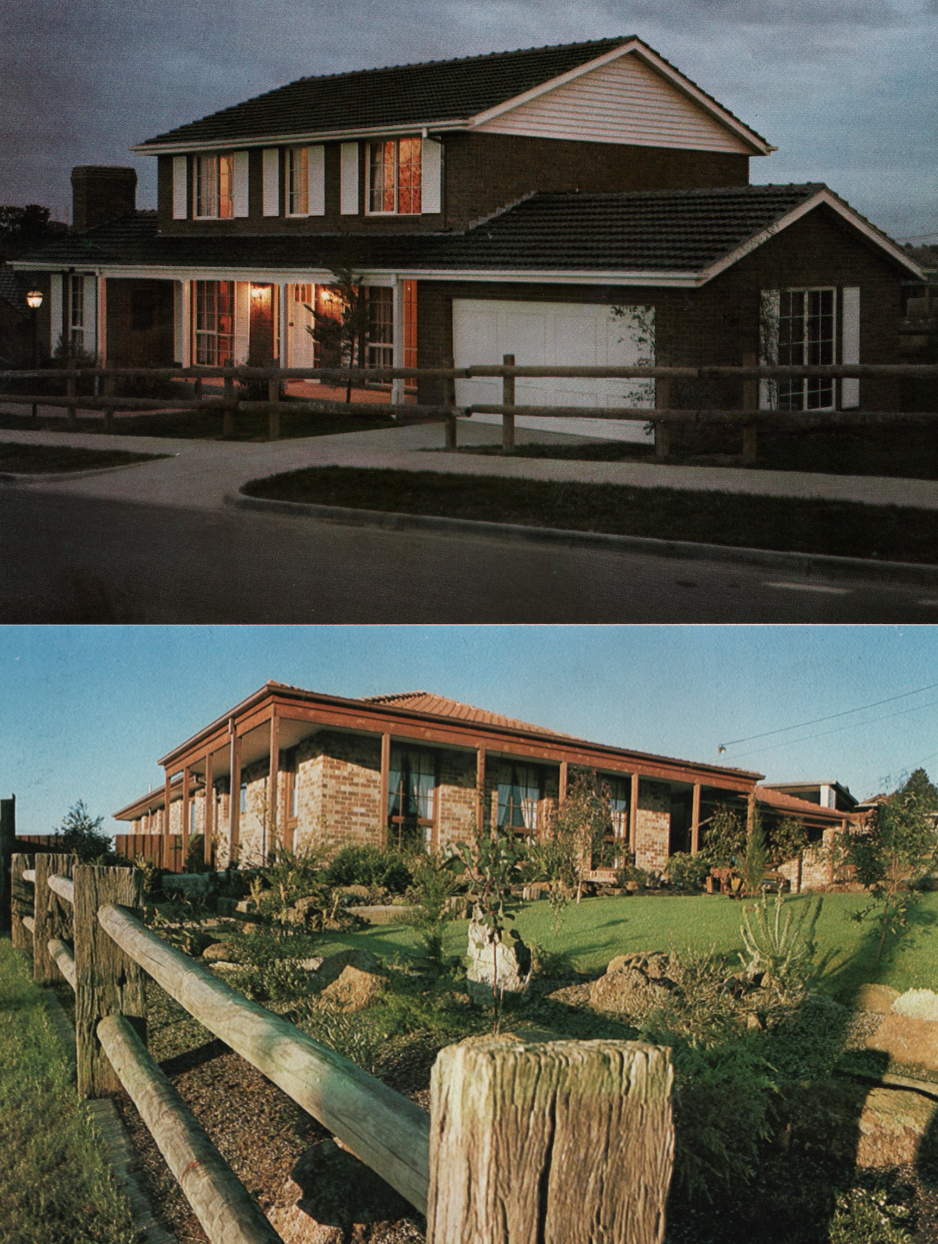
Homes by Macquarie Builders, 1977

Subsequently, Kaiser Aetna Australia considered floating public to replace Jennings, but instead diversified into the home building industries. The company acquired large tracts of farmland on the outskirts of Melbourne for turnkey home developments. Its first residential project was the Pioneer Ridge estate in Vermont South, where they launched their home-building division, Macquarie Builders.

The company's in-house drafting team designed homes in a rustic style that aimed to blend in with the Australian landscape and emphasised a use of natural materials. Its designs drew inspiration from traditional Australian homestead architecture and colonial architecture. Homes could be purchased either as turnkey properties within Kaiser Aetna estates or built on clients' own land.

At Pioneer Ridge, the company built a prominent display village featuring multiple furnished homes. Among these was the Macquarie Lodge, which was one of the largest Victorian display homes (by square metre) at the time, becoming a local attraction. It was located at Burwood Highway and was described in contemporary media as the company's flagship design.

Kaiser Aetna reportedly owned over $24 million of property in Australia by 1975.

=== Dissolution ===
Beginning in 1973, Kaiser Aetna grew increasingly dissatisfied with the Whitlam government's attitude towards foreign involvement in Australian land investment. Furthermore, Kaiser Aetna had never found a replacement to AJ Jennings. This, combined with a market slump in the United States, lead Kaiser Aetna to put its Australian operations on the market in 1975.

The company asked $24.7m for its assets, which included five industrial projects, two shopping centre projects, and three residential projects in New South Wales alone.

== List of developments ==
| Launched | Name | Location | Notes/Sources |
|---|---|---|---|
| 1971 | Blacktown Industrial Estate | Blacktown, New South Wales | |
| 1971 | Dandenong Park Industrial Estate | Dandenong South, Victoria | |
| 1971 | Stokes Orchard Estate | Eltham, Victoria | |
| 1971 | Dorset Industrial Estate | Bayswater, Victoria | |
| 1971 | Glenvale Industrial Estate | Mulgrave, Victoria | |
| 1971 | Monash Industrial Estate | Mulgrave, Victoria | |
| 1971 | Thomastown Industrial Estate | Thomastown, Victoria | |
| 1971 | Western Highway Industrial Estate | Girraween, New South Wales | |
| 1974 | Pioneer Ridge | Vermont South, Victoria | |
| 1975 | Ocean Reef | Ocean Reef, Western Australia | |
| 1977 | Burwood Highway Industrial Estate | Knoxfield and Boronia, Victoria | |
