= Richards, New South Wales =

Richards
- Suburb
- Interactive map of Richards
- Coordinates: 33°40′08″S 150°51′16″E
- Country: Australia
- State: New South Wales
- City: Sydney
- LGA: City of Blacktown
- Location: 39 km (24 mi) north-west of Sydney CBD
- Established: 2020

Government
  - State electorate: Riverstone
  - Federal division: Division of Chifley

Area
  - Total: 2.8 km^{2} (1.1 sq mi)
- Elevation: 32 m (105 ft)

Population
  - Total: 37 (SAL 2021)
- Postcode: 2765
Suburbs around Richards
Vineyard	Vineyard	Vineyard
Angus	Richards	Riverstone
Angus	Riverstone	Riverstone

Richards is a suburb of Sydney, in the state of New South Wales, Australia. Richards is located north-west of Sydney City in the local government area of Blacktown.

== History ==
Richards is situated in the Darug traditional Aboriginal country. Richards was approved as a suburb on 7 September 2020 and gazetted on 6 November 2020. Prior to the suburb's creation, the area was part of Riverstone and Vineyard.

The origin of the suburb name is from Benjamin Richards who established an abattoir in the area, in 1878.
