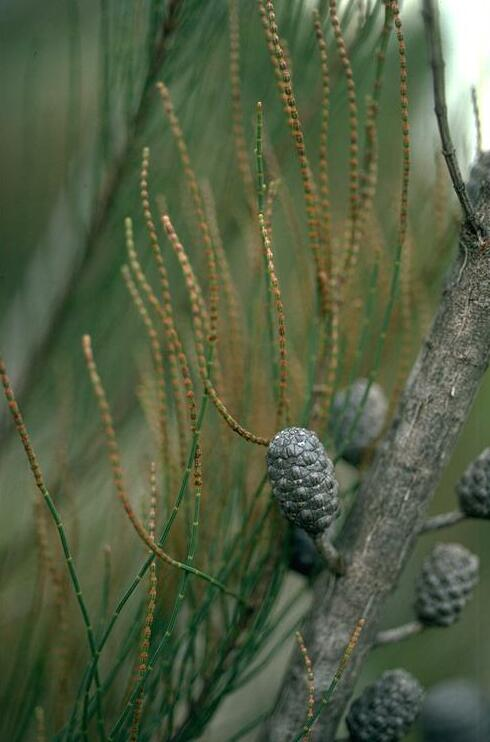
- Male spikes and mature cones

Conservation status
- Endangered (EPBC Act)

Scientific classification
- Kingdom: Plantae
- Clade: Tracheophytes
- Clade: Angiosperms
- Clade: Eudicots
- Clade: Rosids
- Order: Fagales
- Family: Casuarinaceae
- Genus: Allocasuarina
- Species: A. glareicola

Binomial name
- Allocasuarina glareicola L.A.S.Johnson
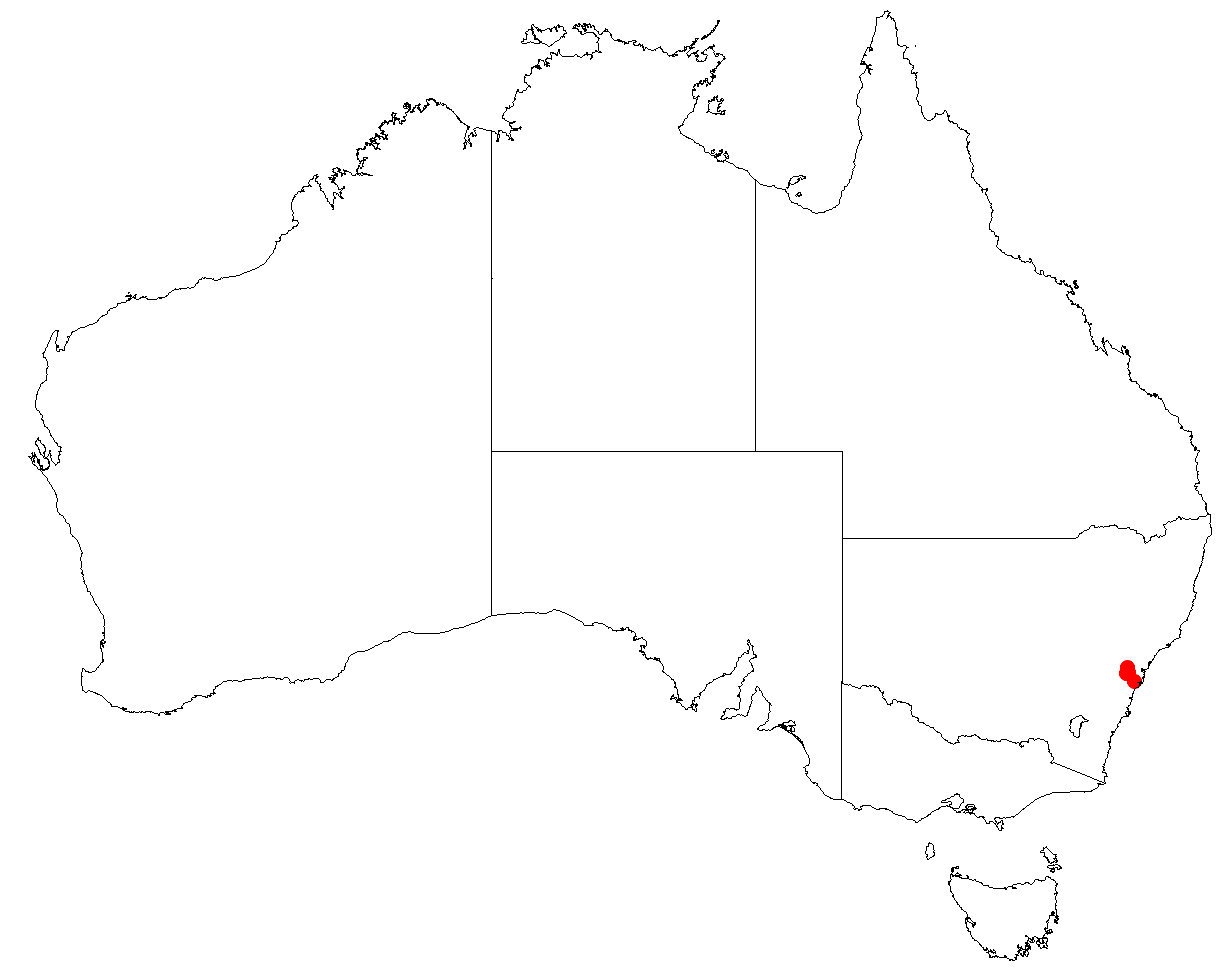
- Occurrence data from AVH

= Allocasuarina glareicola =

Species of flowering plant

Allocasuarina glareicola is a species of flowering plant in the family Casuarinaceae and is endemic to a restricted part of New South Wales. It is an erect, dioecious or monoecious shrub that has branchlets up to 200 mm (7.9 in) long, the leaves reduced to scales in whorls of five to seven, the fruiting cones 10–13 mm (0.39–0.51 in) long containing winged seeds (samaras) 3.0–3.5 mm (0.12–0.14 in) long.

== Description ==
Allocasuarina glareicola is an erect, often poorly developed, dioecious or monoecious shrub that typically grows to a height of 1–2 m (3 ft 3 in – 6 ft 7 in). Its branchlets are more or less erect, up to 200 mm (7.9 in) long, the leaves reduced to erect, scale-like teeth 0.2–0.5 mm (0.0079–0.0197 in) long, arranged in whorls of five to seven around the branchlets. The sections of branchlet between the leaf whorls (the "articles") are 5–11 mm (0.20–0.43 in) long and 0.5–0.7 mm (0.020–0.028 in) wide. Male flowers are arranged like a string of beads, in spikes 2–25 mm (0.079–0.984 in) long, with about 5 whorls per centimetre (per 0.39 in.), the anthers 0.7–0.8 mm (0.028–0.031 in) long. Female cones are cylindrical, on a peduncle 4–7 mm (0.16–0.28 in) long, the mature cones 10–13 mm (0.39–0.51 in) long and 7–8 mm (0.28–0.31 in) in diameter, the samaras brown and 3.0–3.5 mm (0.12–0.14 in) long.

== Taxonomy ==
Allocasuarina glareicola was first described in 1989 by Lawrie Johnson in Flora of Australia. The specific epithet, (glareicola) means "gravel-dweller".

== Distribution and habitat ==
This she-oak grows in open forest on lateritic soil, and is restricted to a range of about 36 km^{2} (14 sq mi) in and around the Castlereagh Nature Reserve.

== Ecology ==
This species resprouts from a lignotuber after fire and spreads by root suckers, so that many stems may be of a single individual plant.

== Conservation status ==
Allocasuarina glareicola is listed as "Endangered" under the Australian Government Environment Protection and Biodiversity Conservation Act 1999 and the New South Wales Government Biodiversity Conservation Act 2016. The main threats to the species include rubbish dumping, inappropriate fire regimes, weed invasion and habitat loss.
