= Edmond Atalla =

Australian politician (born 1960)

Edmond Atalla MP
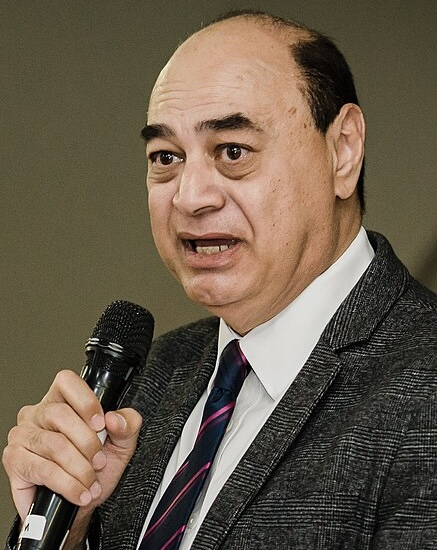
- Atalla in 2022

Member of the New South Wales Legislative Assembly
- Incumbent
- Assumed office 28 March 2015
- Constituency: Mount Druitt

Deputy Mayor of Blacktown
- In office September 2006 – September 2007
- Mayor: Leo Kelly
- Preceded by: Barbara Gapps
- Succeeded by: Michelle Rowland

Councillor of Blacktown City Council for Fourth Ward
- In office 23 March 2004 – 10 September 2016

Personal details
- Born: 17 July 1960 (age 66) Port Sudan, Sudan
- Party: Labor Party
- Education: University of Wollongong
- Profession: Civil engineer

Edmond Atalla (born 17 July 1960) is an Australian politician and professional engineer. A member of the Labor Party, Atalla has represented Mount Druitt in the New South Wales Legislative Assembly since 2015. The child of Coptic Egyptian parents, Atalla is known for his advocacy for members of Australia's Coptic community.

== Early life and education ==
Atalla was born in Port Sudan, Sudan on 17 July 1960 to Coptic Egyptian parents. Atalla and his family migrated to Australia, arriving on Anzac Day. The family settled at Prospect, New South Wales in 1970, where Atalla attended the local public school. Atalla went on to attend Grantham High School in Seven Hills. As a child, Atalla and his family attended the Coptic Orthodox Church in Redfern, Sydney.

Atalla studied a Bachelor of Engineering degree (Honours) at the University of Wollongong, where he graduated in 1988. During his time at the University of Wollongong, Atalla gained employment as a junior engineer with Holroyd Municipal Council before he moved to the Mount Druitt Electorate in 1987.

== Career before politics ==
In 1989, Atalla was hired as the NSW state project engineer for CSR Readymix, where he later gained a builder's licence. In 1993, Atalla moved back to local government as an engineer for the Liverpool City Council, and was then promoted to building services manager for the citywide services in 1997, and again in 2000 to corporate manager of operations (head of the Engineering Operations Department).

In 2005, Atalla became the national building systems manager, a senior position with AVJennings where he was responsible for organisations management. In August 2014, he left private and public engineering to pursue a career in politics when he was preselected to be the Labor candidate for the Electoral district of Mount Druitt.

== Political career ==
=== Early political career ===
Atalla credits his interest into politics when he witnessed first hand the struggles of community members. This defining moment occurred in 1987 when he assisted an elderly man who could not afford to replace his set of dentures after they fell down a Council storm-water drain. Atalla was able to retrieve the dentures, however the man's inability to afford another set "struck a chord", and Atalla resolved to help ensure that all people would have better access to basic necessities.

Atalla joined the Labor Party two years later, in 1989, and states he was "attracted to the principals of Social Justice including access to health and education, employment opportunities, and greater equality in wealth and power". From 2002 to 2007, Atalla was elected as the Vice President and from 2007 to 2015 he acted as Secretary/Treasurer of the Rooty Hill Branch of the Labor Party.

In 2004, he was elected to Blacktown City Council, and in 2006 and 2007 he was deputy mayor. Within his time at the Blacktown City Council, he held the following positions;

- Delegate – Floodplain Management Authorities of NSW (2004–2008)
- Chair – Planning and Development Committee (2008–2012)
- Chair – Historical Committee (2008–2012)
- Vice-president – Western Sydney Regional Organisation of Councils (WSROC)(2009–2010)

=== New South Wales parliament ===
In 2015, Atalla won the Electoral district of Mount Druitt in the New South Wales parliament by a landslide, with a total of 65.4% of the vote against NSW Liberal Party candidate Olivia Lloyd. During this time, he served on the Legislative Assembly Committee on Law and Safety. In 2019, Atalla again won the Mount Druitt seat in the NSW parliament and experienced a positive swing, gaining 66.4% of the vote. In 2019, Atalla supported Chris Minns' campaign to be leader of NSW Labor, which reportedly put him into conflict with fellow Labor MLA Marjorie O'Neill.

Atalla publicly opposed plans to demolish the Coptic Church's historic church at Sydenham. In 2017, Atalla attended a ceremony hosted by Pope Tawadros II to commemorate the construction of a new Coptic Church at Kellyville. Atalla criticized fellow Sudanese-Australian Yassmin Abdel-Magied over her comments on Anzac Day in 2017.

Civic offices
Preceded by Barbara Gapps	Deputy Mayor of Blacktown; 2006–2007	Succeeded by Michelle Rowland
New South Wales Legislative Assembly
Preceded by Richard Amery	Member for Mount Druitt; 2015–present	Incumbent
