= List of ambassadors of Malta to China =

Coordinates: 39.934297°N 116.457824°E

Ambassador of Malta to China
- Incumbent; John Busuttil since {{dts|2023/24/4
- Appointer: President of Malta
- Inaugural holder: Joseph Lennard Forace
- Formation: June 14, 1972

The Maltese ambassador in Beijing is the official representative of the Government in Valletta to the Government of the People's Republic of China.

== List of representatives ==
Diplomatic agrément/Diplomatic accreditation	Ambassador	Observations	List of prime ministers of Malta	Premier of the People's Republic of China	Term end
June 14, 1972	Joseph Lennard Forace		Dom Mintoff	Zhou Enlai	1978
1981	Alfred J. Falzon		Dom Mintoff	Zhao Ziyang	1982
1986	Clifford Borg Marks	Chargé d'affaires, (*1957 in Malta): In 1982 he graduated from Peking University.; In 1987 he completed graduate studies in Chinese Law at the University of East Asia.; He studied South Pacific law with the University of the South Pacific and is admitted to practice in Tonga.	Karmenu Mifsud Bonnici	Zhao Ziyang	
August 1997	Olaph Terribile	Chargé d'affaires	Eddie Fenech Adami	Li Peng	July 2001
2001	Saviour F. Borg		Eddie Fenech Adami	Zhu Rongji	2004
2004	Saviour Gauci		Lawrence Gonzi	Wen Jiabao	
2006	Mariella Grech	Charge d’Affaires a.i	Lawrence Gonzi	Wen Jiabao	
November 21, 2007	Karl Xuereb		Lawrence Gonzi	Wen Jiabao	2010
12 February 2011	Joe Cassar		Lawrence Gonzi	Wen Jiabao	2013
August 23, 2013	Clifford Borg Marks		Joseph Muscat	Li Keqiang	
May 5, 2016	John Aquilina	twelfth ambassador	Joseph Muscat	Li Keqiang	March 2022
24 April, 2023	John Busuttil		Robert Abela	Li Qiang	
