= Fabian LoSchiavo =

Australian Catholic novice (1949–2023)

Fabian LoSchiavo (15 December 1949 - 11 May 2023) was an Australian Catholic novice who, following years of conversion therapy and other interventions, fought to have gay people included within Australian Christian churches. He was a member of synod for the Anglican Diocese of Sydney between 1977 to 1986 and, during this time, founded AngGays an LGBTQI+ group within the Anglican church which fought for the recognition of gay men within the church.

LoSchiavo faced considerable hostility during his time which led him to join the Order of Perpetual Indulgence, Sydney in 1981 where he became known, amongst other names, as Mother Abyss and Mother Inferior.

== Early life and study ==
LoSchiavo was born in Sydney and religion was important to him from a very early age and, even as a child, he filled his bedroom with religious paraphernalia and, of this he said he cultivated an "over the top kind of spirituality" and that he was an unstable mixture of “extreme piety and extreme attraction to sex”. He wanted to become a priest from childhood and started sending enquiries from the age of 15, however, his parents insisted on him finishing school first.

After finishing high school he became of novice at St. Norbert Abbey in Wisconsin, a premonstratensian order, in 1969 after a brief postulancy with Franciscans in Campbelltown. At the Abbey he was the only Australian and there the order was quite open and many of the masses they held as well as how they trained the novices were "experimental". LoSchiavo recalled his initial disappointment with this:

When I joined I was very disappointed that it was not traditional in any way. It was totally open and modern. People were turning up to prayer in shorts and singlets; the habit wasn't worn very often; there wasn't the cloistered feeling or even cloistral silence. We went to college to study with other ordinary students. We were living like students in a dorm. We had freedom to come and go, and that applied also to our relationships with each other-but they didn't tell anyone that the physical aspect of relationships might turn into a sexual one because some of us were what we now call "gay".

— Fabian Lo Schiavo, interview in August 1995

There LoSchiavo became sexually active within the community and he found that this made his more pious and observant in his religious life and he started to attend several masses a day. However, this level of change led to many in the order, including LoSchiavo, to return to traditionalism. It was soon after this that he was sent to a psychiatrist by the novice master to address his sexuality or, as it was phrased to “work out the problem”. Later this led to him spending time in a psychiatric ward.

Ultimately LoSchiavo resolved not to become a priest within the Catholic Church and, on his return to Sydney in 1972, he sought other entries to priesthood through other Christian denominations.

== Return to Australia ==
Newly returned to Sydney LoSchiavo began attending more liberal, Anglican churches and he found people very welcoming, although he was unsure whether they presumed he was gay or not. During this time he also worked at a bar lived in Kings Cross where he had an active gay life. Soon after this he experienced violence and, blaming his homosexuality, he decided to enter aversion therapy, as a form of conversion therapy, where they used electric shock treatment in an attempt to remove his sexual drive. This therapy took place with Neil McConaghy and LoSchiavo states that it was unsuccessful at removing his desires and that it, ultimately, confirmed his identity as a gay man.

Following this treatment LoSchiavo was referred to a psychologist and did see improvements in his mental health not achieved through the aversion therapy. He also begun studying at the University of New South Wales where he joined gay groups and had a series of boyfriends. After finishing his degree he took a role as an archivist at the NSW State Archives where he worked from 1981 until his retirement in 2012.

From 1977 to 1986 he was a member of the Synod of the Anglican Diocese of Sydney where he encountered significant hostility and, in 1978 he founded AngGays, a group to support gay Anglicans. One of AngGays primary aims was to meet the spiritual needs of individual gay and lesbian people within the church and to assist in referring them to 'sympathetic parishes'. As a part of this, one of the first acts of the group, was to send letters to all ministers in Sydney asking them about their commitment to openly acknowledge gay Christians and asking to meet with them.

In 1978 he also marched in the first Sydney Gay and Lesbian Mardi Gras, alongside other members of AngGays, holding a sign saying “Gay, Free and C of E” [Church of England].

== Sisters of Perpetual Indulgence ==
Later, in 1981, he met with a member of the Sisters of Perpetual Indulgence and, upon joining them as a founding member, took of the name Mother Inferior but also later the name Mother Abyss and a series of other names. He believes he had always had the desire to "be a nun" although being Anglican was also, by this time, a core part of his identity.

In the Sisters LoSchiavo found an outlet for his love of traditional religious ceremony as well as his identity as a gay man and desire to be an activist. As a member he was able to advocate not only for himself, and other gay men, but also for the broader LGBTQI+ community, peace, international solidarity, union events and in support of sex workers and drug users. He was also an advocate for safe sex and, particularly so, during the AIDS crisis in Australia.

Examples of a major protests that he took part in was the Sydney Gay Rights Embassy which was set up for three weeks outside the home of Neville Wran, the then Premier of New South Wales, in September 1983. Another was during the 1986 visit by Pope John Paul II in which he was arrested for chanting 'anti woman, anti gay, fascist Pope go away!' alongside Sister Mary Mary Quite Contrary (Peter Collard).

LoSchiavo would also officiate exorcisms, raffles and dogs shows as a nun.

In 1986 he was removed from the Anglican parish that he had been attending in Sydney as he was blamed for its lack of growth as his connection to it, and therefore the Sisters of Perpetual Indulgence, provided a "constant link with homosexuality".

== Later life and death ==
LoSchiavo died in 2023 and, following his death, he was credited for the role he had in making Australian gay Christians more visible.

It was LoSchiavo goal to create safe spaces for LGBTQI+ people to express themselves, including their spirituality, gender and sexuality and, of this, he said:

'I have no great problem with Mother Inferior and the very Church of England Fabian Lo Schiavo co-existing. If people have a problem, “how can you be both?”, then that's their problem. They are the same person after all…they just look and act a bit different'

— Fabian Lo Schiavo, Mother Knows Best, 2016
