= Warren Kirby =

Australian politician

Warren Kirby MP
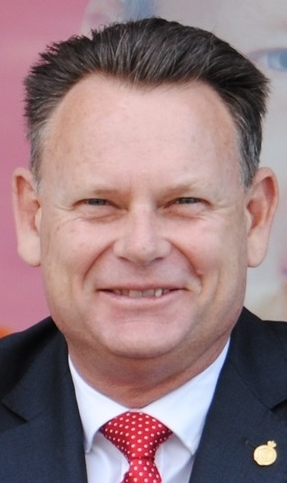
- Kirby in 2023

Member of the New South Wales Legislative Assembly
- Incumbent
- Assumed office 25 March 2023
- Constituency: Riverstone

Personal details
- Party: Labor

Warren Eric Kirby is an Australian politician. He has been a Labor member of the New South Wales Legislative Assembly representing the Electoral District of Riverstone since the 2023 New South Wales state election.

Before entering politics Kirby was a small-business owner, operating the ‘Good Egg Studio’ within his current electorate, and was the Vice President of the North West Business Chamber.

== Political career ==
In 2023, Kirby was preselected as Labor's candidate for the marginal seat of Riverstone for the 2023 state election. He defeated the Liberal candidate Mohit Kumar with 53.7% of the two-party-preferred vote, a swing of 9.9 points, to succeed the retiring member Kevin Conolly. On election night federal member for Greenway (which covers part of Riverstone) and former ALP NSW branch president Michelle Rowland commended Kirby on his campaign.
