= Kevin Conolly =

Australian politician

- Conolly in 2019

Member of the New South Wales Parliament for Riverstone
- In office 26 March 2011 – 25 March 2023
- Preceded by: John Aquilina
- Succeeded by: Warren Kirby

NSW Parliamentary Secretary for Education
- In office 24 April 2019 – 25 March 2023
- Minister: Sarah Mitchell
- Preceded by: Gareth Ward
- Succeeded by: Greg Warren

Personal details
- Born: 31 December 1958 (age 67)
- Party: Liberal Party
- Education: University of New South Wales; Australian Catholic University
- Occupation: Education officer
- Website: http://www.kevinconollymp.com.au

Kevin Francis Conolly (born 31 December 1958), an Australian politician, is a former member of the New South Wales Legislative Assembly representing Riverstone for the Liberal Party between 2011 and 2023.

== Early years and background ==
Conolly was educated at St Joseph's College, Hunters Hill and then graduated with a Bachelor of Arts from the University of New South Wales. He was later awarded a Diploma of Education and Graduate Diploma of Religious Education from the Catholic College of Education, Sydney. Conolly subsequently graduated with a Graduate Diploma in Education (Administration) from the Australian Catholic University. He worked for the Catholic Education Office in the Diocese of Parramatta before entering state politics.

== Political career ==
In September 1999, he was elected to the Hawkesbury City Council. From 2001 to 2004 he served as deputy mayor, while still working as a teaching administrator. Conolly contested the 1999 state election, but was unsuccessful in winning the seat of Londonderry for the Liberal Party.

In 2007 and again in 2011, Conolly contested the normally safe Labor seat of Riverstone in north-western Sydney. In March 2011, Conolly was elected with a two-party swing of 30.2 points—almost unheard of in Australian politics. He ultimately won the seat with 70.2 per cent of the vote, turning it into a comfortably safe Liberal seat in one stroke. His primary-vote margin was actually enough for him to take the seat without the need for preferences. It was the first time in the seat's 30-year history that the seat was not held by Labor. Before the election, the sitting member, John Aquilina, who had held the seat since 1991, announced his retirement.

Conolly opposes same-sex marriage, declaring in a 2015 statement that "marriage existed before parliaments and government" and that it was a "relationship that reflects the laws of nature".

Conolly opposed the Abortion Law Reform Act 2019, describing it as "capital punishment for being unwanted" and "a fascist solution in search of a problem". Along with Mulgoa MP Tanya Davies, Conolly threatened to move to the crossbench unless certain amendments were passed, stripping the Liberal Party of their majority.

In August 2022, Conolly announced that he would not be recontesting his seat and that he would retire at the March 2023 New South Wales State Election.

New South Wales Legislative Assembly
Preceded by John Aquilina	Member for Riverstone; 2011–2023	Succeeded by Warren Kirby
