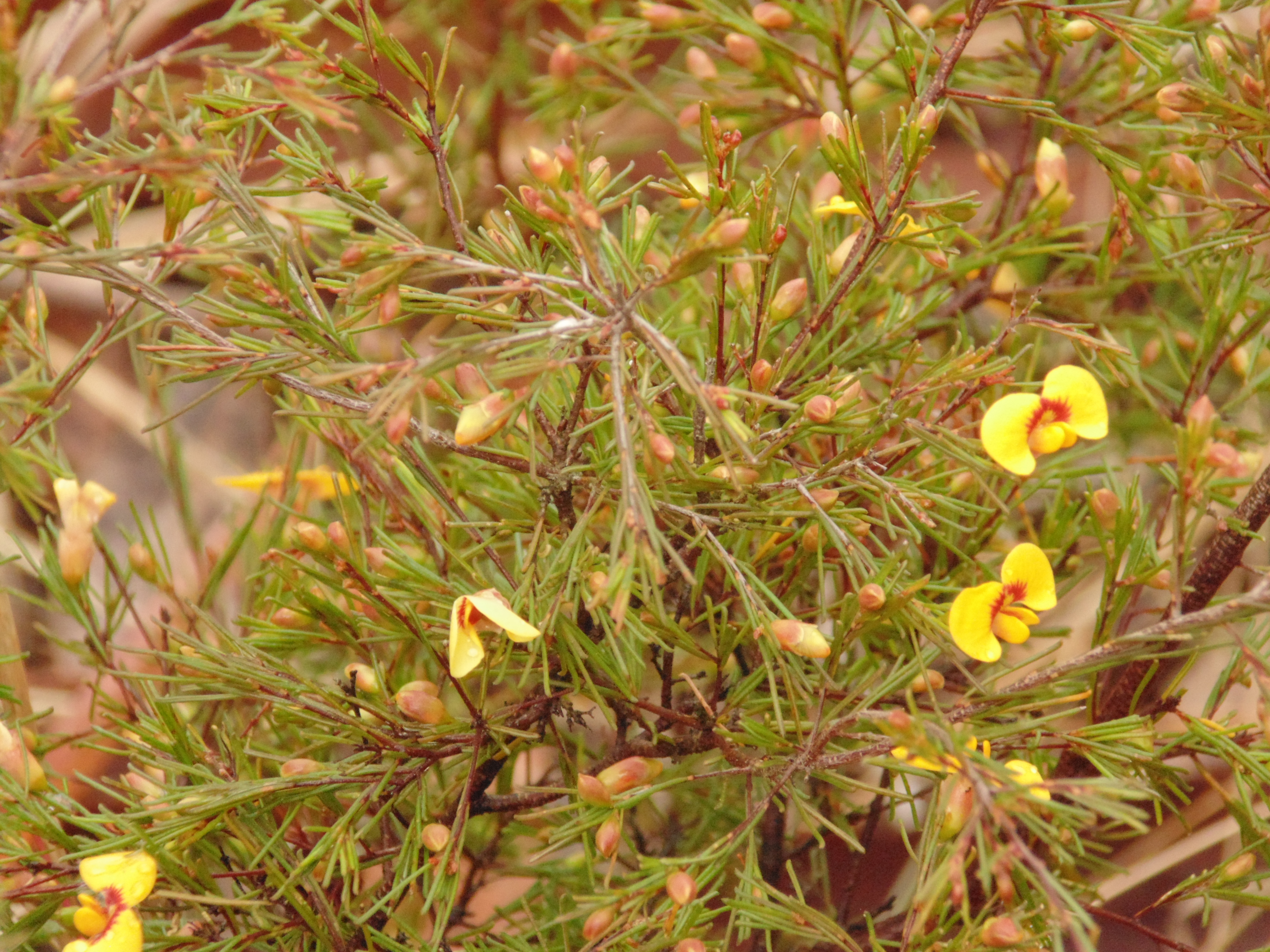
- At Castlereagh

Conservation status
- Vulnerable (EPBC Act)

Scientific classification
- Kingdom: Plantae
- Clade: Tracheophytes
- Clade: Angiosperms
- Clade: Eudicots
- Clade: Rosids
- Order: Fabales
- Family: Fabaceae
- Subfamily: Faboideae
- Genus: Dillwynia
- Species: D. tenuifolia

Binomial name
- Dillwynia tenuifolia DC.

Synonyms
- Dillwynia ericifolia var. tenuifolia (DC.) Benth.

= Dillwynia tenuifolia =

Species of legume

Dillwynia tenuifolia is a species of flowering plant in the family Fabaceae and is endemic to eastern New South Wales. It is an erect shrub with linear leaves, and orange-yellow and red flowers.

== Description ==
Dillwynia tenuifolia is an erect shrub that typically grows to a height of 0.6–1.0 m (2 ft 0 in – 3 ft 3 in), its stems covered with short curved hairs. The leaves are linear, glabrous or sometimes hairy near the tip, and 4–12 mm (0.16–0.47 in) long. The flowers are usually arranged singly in leaf axils or on the ends of branchlets on a peduncle less than 3 mm (0.12 in) long. There are bracts and bracteoles about 1 mm (0.039 in) long. The sepals are 4–5 mm (0.16–0.20 in) long and the standard petal is orange-yellow and red, 7–10 mm (0.28–0.39 in) long. Flowering mainly occurs from February to March and the fruit is a pod 4–5 mm (0.16–0.20 in) long.

== Taxonomy and naming ==
Dillwynia tenuifolia was first formally described in 1825 by Augustin Pyramus de Candolle in his Prodromus Systematis Naturalis Regni Vegetabilis. The specific epithet (tenuifolia) means "thin-leaved".

== Distribution and habitat ==
This dillwynia grows in forest between the Cumberland Plain, Blue Mountains and Howes Valley on the coast and tablelands of New South Wales.

== Conservation status ==
Dillwynia tenuifolia is listed as 'vulnerable' under the New South Wales Government Biodiversity Conservation Act 2016, and a population in Kemps Creek is listed as an 'endangered population' under the same Act. The main threats to the species and to the threatened population include habitat fragmentation, inappropriate fire regimes, weed invasion and recreational vehicle use.
