= Riverstone, New South Wales =

Riverstone
- Suburb
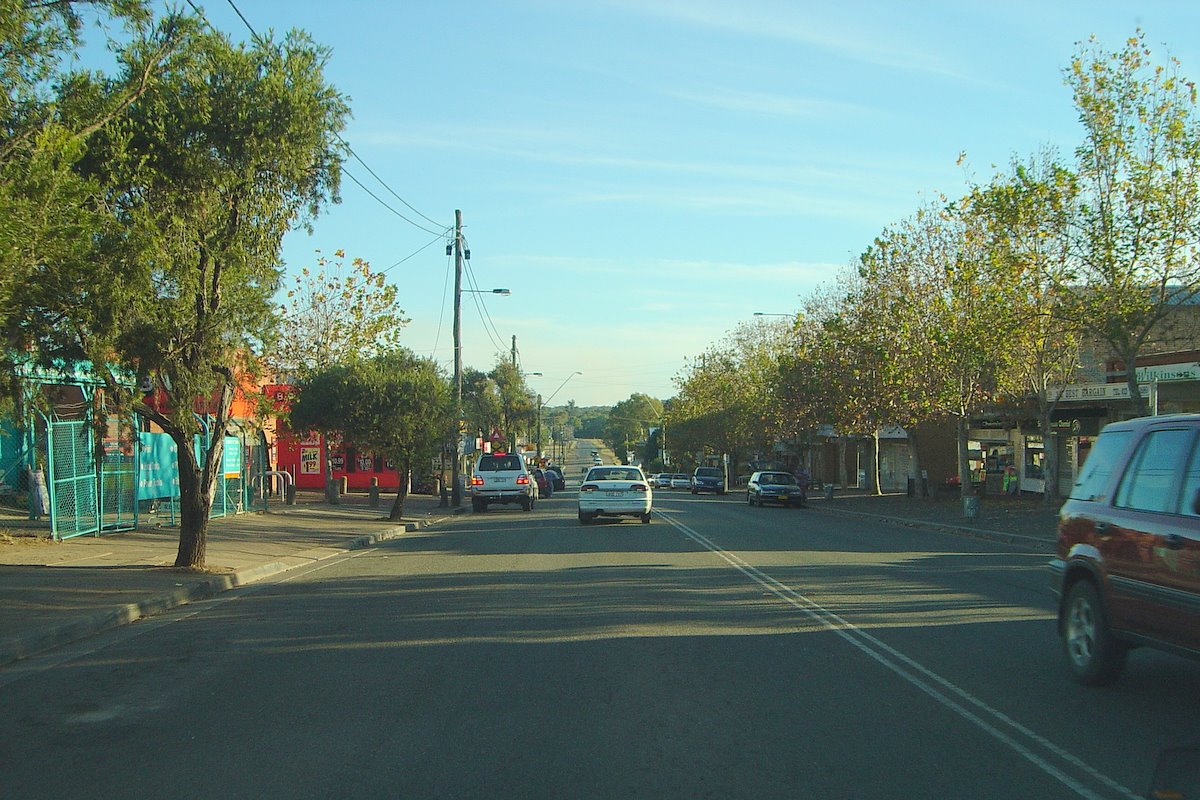
- Riverstone Town Centre

- Interactive map of Riverstone
- Country: Australia
- State: New South Wales
- City: Sydney
- LGA: City of Blacktown
- Location: 48 km (30 mi) NW of Sydney CBD

Government
  - State electorate: Riverstone
  - Federal divisions: Greenway; Chifley

Area
  - Total: 5.52 km^{2} (2.13 sq mi)
- Elevation: 21 m (69 ft)

Population
  - Total: 8,627 (2021 census)
  - Density: 1,562.9/km^{2} (4,048/sq mi)
- Postcode: 2765
Suburbs around Riverstone
Richards	Vineyard	Grantham Farm
Angus	Riverstone	Rouse Hill
Marsden Park	Schofields	Tallawong

Riverstone ( /rɪvərstən/) is a suburb of Sydney in the state of New South Wales, Australia. Riverstone is located 48 kilometres (30 mi) north-west of the Sydney central business district, in the Blacktown local government area and part of the Greater Western Sydney region. Originally settled in 1803 as part of a government stock farm, Riverstone is one of the oldest towns in Australia.

As at the 2021 census, Riverstone had an estimated population of 8,627.

== History ==
Prior to settlement and colonisation of Australia, the area that was to become known as Riverstone was inhabited by the Bediagal people of the Darug nation. Most of these people died due to introduced diseases following the arrival of the First Fleet, and the remainder were largely relocated to government farms and a series of settlements.

=== 18th & 19th centuries ===
The Sydney Cove region originally settled in 1788 turned out to be unsuitable for farming, and after a number of years of near-famine in the colony, efforts were made to relocate food production inland to hopefully more climatically stable regions. In 1803 a government stock farm was established in what was to become the Riverstone/Marsden Park area, on the basis of the abundant water supply and good grazing land there.

In 1804, the infamous Castle Hill convict rebellion broke out in nearby Castle Hill. Those who took part in the armed convict uprising who then tried to escape to the Hawkesbury would have traversed the Riverstone district.

In 1810, Lieut-Col Maurice Charles O'Connell was granted 2,500 acres (10 km^{2}) of land in the district, which he named "Riverston Farm", after his birthplace in Ireland. (The "e" at the end first appeared on railway timetables in the 1860s, an apparent misprint that has become the accepted spelling, although in the Sydney region the name is still pronounced as though the "e" is not present).

Originally, beef cattle farmed in the area were driven overland to the Hawkesbury River for transport by sailing ship to the convict settlement at Sydney Cove. The construction of the Sydney to Richmond Railway line in 1864 both eliminated the need for this and opened up the region to non-rural development.

In June 1867 the largest flood in record happened in Riverstone, with flood waters up to 19.7 metres. A rescue was launched on 22 June 1867 by the station master at Blacktown to rescue the nine people still trapped in Riverstone. A journey of 10 miles (16 km) by boat was required to get the people to safety.

An important meatworks was established in the town in 1878, undergoing various stages of rebuilding and expansion until it closed permanently in 1992.

Formal approval for Riverstone Public School was granted in 1879, and the school was completed and opened in January 1883. The school was originally built with a capacity of 42, but already had an average attendance of 41 in its first fortnight operating. It would be the only school in Riverstone until 1957.

=== 20th century ===
In November 1961 there was a major flood in Riverstone. Flood waters rose up to 15 metres at nearby Windsor.

On 9 October 1970, a major fire at the Riverstone Meatworks killed six men. The men were attempting to lead sheep to safety, when a wall collapsed and trapped them. It had been the second fire in the building in three months.

In 1988, as part of a Federal Government programme to commemorate the 200th anniversary of European settlement in Australia, a heritage museum was established in the old Masonic hall.

=== 21st century ===
The suburb boundaries of Riverstone were changed in November 2020, shrinking the size of the suburb and creating the new suburbs of Grantham Farm in the east and Richards and Angus in the west. The suburb also no longer extended into the Hawkesbury local government area, with those areas absorbed into the suburb of Vineyard.

There was again major flooding in 2021, which saw some homes along Marsden Road become completely submerged.

== Heritage listings ==
Riverstone has a number of heritage-listed sites, including:

- Riverstone railway station
- Station residence
- Riverstone Mosque Building
- St Pauls Building at New Light Anglican Church

== Developments ==
Riverstone Terrace

Mary O'Connell, formerly Putland nee Bligh died in 1864. Her estate was eventually sold off including most of the original grant from Governor Lachlan Macquarie. Later a pattern of intersecting streets was laid out, mostly named after famous streets in London (e.g. Piccadilly Street, Gladstone Parade etc). When the railway line was extended from Blacktown to Richmond, a railway station was constructed at Riverstone, opening in 1864. Other infrastructure was constructed such as a school, churches, hotel and stores. The presumption was that Riverstone was set to become an important regional centre but this did not eventuate.

Most of the allotments were eventually taken up for suburban housing but a few of the original 1880s blocks remain vacant to the present day. Riverstone terrace, erected in 1883, is a curious relic of the anticipated 19th century population boom. It was meant to be the first of a row of high-density terrace housing units that would run the length of Garfield road. However this single block and the small unit next to it were the only ones ever built. For many years the sight of a high density inner-city housing block situated in an empty country paddock remained a bizarre local landmark.

Riverstone remained a small country town until the beginning of the 21st century when the current housing boom swallowed it up as part of the urban sprawl. Large areas of former farmland have recently (2014) also been released for housing in Riverstone and surrounding suburbs. On its northern side Riverstone still has a large and thriving industrial area. Poultry farming and intensive market gardening are also still important activities in the area.

== Population ==
According to the 2021 census of Population, there were 8,627 people in Riverstone.

- Aboriginal and Torres Strait Islander people made up 4.9% of the population.
- 65.9% of people were born in Australia. The next most common countries of birth were India 6.8%, Philippines 3.0%, Nepal 2.1%, New Zealand 1.8% and Pakistan 1.5%.
- 66.1% of people spoke only English at home. Other languages spoken at home included Punjabi 2.8%, Nepali 2.6%, Urdu 2.3%, Hindi 1.8% and Tagalog 1.6%.
- The most common responses for religion were No Religion 27.1%, Catholic 22.0%, Anglican 12.4%, Hinduism 8.3% and Not stated 6.5%.

== Schools ==
There are currently two public schools in Riverstone: Riverstone High School (Est 1962) and Riverstone Public School (Est 1883). Originally the school operated on the site now housing the Museum. For many years the Infants Department and Primary School were in separate buildings but are now located on the one site in Elizabeth Street. Riverstone also has three private schools: St Johns Catholic Primary School (Est 1950), Norwest Christian College (1980) (formerly known as Coverdale Christian School) and Australian Christian College. ACC has two components: the on campus day school and the distance education school, which serves home educated students across New South Wales.

== Places of Worship ==
=== Christian ===
- Reach Church Riverstone
- Riverstone Baptist Church
- Riverstone Community Church
- New Light Anglican Church - Formerly known as Life Anglican Church
- Riverstone Uniting Church
- St John the Evangelist Catholic Church
- Voice of Victory Church
- Free Presbyterian

=== Islamic ===
- Marsden Park Masjid - The Masjid is located in Riverstone, while serving the Marsden Park community.

=== Hindu ===
- The Vaishnav Sangh of Sydney - Located in Riverstone.

== Transport ==
Level crossing at Riverstone

Riverstone is situated between the Richmond Road running from Blacktown to Richmond, and the Windsor Road running from Windsor to North Parramatta.

Riverstone railway station is on the Richmond branch. From dawn to about midnight, commuter trains to Sydney leave at approximately 30-minute intervals, in most cases coinciding with the arrival of a train from Sydney. They stay for two minutes because the next station, Vineyard, is single platform. After that they shift to an hourly schedule. Depending on the hour, train services running through Riverstone offer a varying number of "limited stops" to the Sydney CBD and the majority then continue over the Sydney Harbour Bridge to the North Shore line and Hornsby or Berowra. Apart from the city stations, transfer to most other lines is easily made at Strathfield, Redfern or Parramatta, and other stops that offer fewer choices. The peak-hour journey from Riverstone to Central takes a little over an hour, and another 20 minutes to the popular destination of Chatswood. Buses at Riverstone are run by Busways with route 757 that goes to Mount Druitt and 747 to Marsden Park and Rouse Hill.

Developments at the Garfield Rd traffic lights adjacent to the Railway Station have caused massive traffic disruptions.

Riverstone is one of the few suburbs left in the Sydney region with a level crossing with old-fashioned boom gates. This view looking west onto the undeveloped flood-prone paddocks is popular with Sydney film and TV commercial makers as a stand-in for a small country railway station. The final parting scene in the film Beneath Clouds was shot there.

The M7 Motorway can be accessed by the Richmond Road ramp to provide faster access from Riverstone to the city.

Tallawong Metro Station is located just 10 minutes by car from Riverstone's CBD.

== National Broadband Network (NBN) ==
Riverstone was named as one of the second release sites in the rollout of the optical fibre National Broadband Network. As of March 2014 most of the Riverstone residential streets were fitted with the NBN cable.
