= Electoral district of Riverstone =

Riverstone New South Wales—Legislative Assembly
- Interactive map of district boundaries from the 2023 state election
- State: New South Wales
- Created: 1981
- MP: Warren Kirby
- Party: Labor
- Namesake: Riverstone
- Electors: 63,427 (2023)
- Area: 73.42 km^{2} (28.3 sq mi)
- Demographic: Outer-metropolitan
Electorates around Riverstone:
Hawkesbury	Hawkesbury	Hawkesbury
Londonderry	Riverstone	Kellyville
Blacktown	Blacktown	Winston Hills

Riverstone is an electoral district of the Legislative Assembly in the Australian state of New South Wales. It has been represented by Warren Kirby of the Labor Party since the 2023 state election.

Riverstone is widely described as a key marginal seat for both major parties.

== History ==
Much of the electorate is situated in the growing north-west sector, which has been poorly served in transport, health and police resources. Although ancestrally a Labor seat, changing demographics in the eastern portion of the seat (Glenwood, Parklea, Acacia Gardens, Stanhope Gardens, Kellyville Ridge, The Ponds, Rouse Hill) suggested a long-term Liberal trend in voting patterns. Proving this, Liberal Kevin Conolly won the seat in 2011 on a swing of 30.2 percent—almost unheard of in Australian politics—turning the seat from safe Labor to very safe Liberal in one stroke. In 2023, the current member Warren Kirby won the seat back for Labor with a swing of over 12%.

== Geography ==
On its current boundaries, Riverstone takes in the suburbs of Acacia Gardens, Angus, Grantham Farm, Kellyville Ridge, Nirimba Fields, Parklea, Richards, Riverstone, Schofields, Stanhope Gardens, Tallawong, The Ponds and parts of Glenwood, Marsden Park, Quakers Hill, Rouse Hill and Vineyard.

== Members for Riverstone ==
Member	Party	Term
Tony Johnson	Labor	1981–1983
Richard Amery	Labor	1983–1991
John Aquilina	Labor	1991–2011
Kevin Conolly	Liberal	2011–2023
Warren Kirby	Labor	2023–present

== Election results ==
2023 New South Wales state election: Riverstone
Party	Candidate	Votes	%	±%
Labor	Warren Kirby	24,580	44.2	+4.2
Liberal	Mohit Kumar	22,167	39.9	−14.1
Greens	Rob Vail	3,969	7.1	+1.2
Shooters, Fishers, Farmers	Anthony Belcastro	1,816	3.3	+3.3
Independent	Tabitha Ponnambalam	1,761	3.2	+3.2
Sustainable Australia	Tim Horan	1,282	2.3	+2.3
Total formal votes		55,575	96.9	−0.2
Informal votes		1,793	3.1	+0.2
Turnout		57,368	90.4	+5.4
Two-party-preferred result
Labor	Warren Kirby	27,662	53.7	+9.9
Liberal	Mohit Kumar	23,848	46.3	−9.9
Labor gain from Liberal		Swing	+9.9	
