= Neil McConaghy =

Australian psychiatrist (1927–2005)

Nathaniel "Neil" McConaghy (1927–2005) was a Sydney based psychiatrist. He was referred to by Kaplan as called the father of Behaviour therapy in Australian psychiatry.

== Early life ==
He was born in Brisbane, Australia. He won a scholarship to attend the Independent Brisbane Grammar School or Brisbane Boys' College depending on the source. He then studied Medicine at the University of Queensland.

== Career ==
After graduation from medical school he moved to Melbourne in 1951 and started working at Royal Park Hospital. He studied for a diploma of psychological medicine at the University of Melbourne. In the mid-to-late 1950s he worked in Canada followed by a stint at the Maudsley Hospital in the United Kingdom. In 1964 He was appointed to the University of New South Wales School of psychiatry. He had a close working relationship with Kurt Freund, after whom some of his aversion therapy was based. When he attempted to present some of his work on sexuality at an American Psychiatric Association meeting in San Francisco in the early 1970s, there was nearly a riot and it was reported in Time. Clinically he worked at the Behaviour Therapy Research Unit at the Psychiatric Unit at Prince of Wales Hospital, from 1976, until his retirement in 1992. By 1970 he was appointed Associate Professor, and continued to work at UNSW until he retired in 1992. He was awarded his Doctor of Science in 1990 from UNSW.

== Views ==
When interviewed by Kaplan in 1994 he stated ‘Rape, incest and child abuse are nothing new. Despite the fact that it’s abhorrent to people, there is no scientific evidence it permanently traumatises the victim.’. Although he was a practitioner of Aversion therapy he believed that Sexual orientation cannot be changed and supported Decriminalisation of homosexuality.

He told Sue Wills in 1973 “I feel ultimately hopeful that the time could come when public attitudes to homosexuality are such that people won’t get so distressed about their homosexuality.”.

== Personal life ==
His wife was Helen Molony, they had two daughters Finola and Suzi. He declared himself a Marxist and was Bisexual.

== Selected publications ==
- 1993 book, Sexual Behaviour, Problems, and Management
- Two clinically discrete syndromes of transsexualism. Buhrich N, McConaghy N. The British Journal of Psychiatry. 1978;133:73–76. doi:10.1192/bjp.133.1.73
