= Vineyard, New South Wales =

Vineyard
- Suburb
- Interactive map of Vineyard
- Coordinates: 33°39′1″S 150°51′22″E
- Country: Australia
- State: New South Wales
- City: Sydney
- LGAs: City of Blacktown; City of Hawkesbury
- Location: 50 km (31 mi) west of Sydney CBD

Government
  - State electorates: Riverstone; Hawkesbury
  - Federal division: Macquarie
- Elevation: 36 m (118 ft)

Population
  - Total: 1,143 (2021 census)
- Postcode: 2765
Suburbs around Vineyard
Windsor	Mulgrave	McGraths Hill
South Windsor	Vineyard	Oakville
Windsor Downs	Richards	Box Hill

Vineyard is a suburb of Sydney, in the state of New South Wales, Australia. Vineyard is located 50 kilometres west of the Sydney central business district, in the local government area of the City of Blacktown with part of it in the City of Hawkesbury. Vineyard is part of the Greater Western Sydney region. It is bounded in the west by Eastern Creek until its confluence with South Creek, a tributary of the Hawkesbury River.

== History ==
Vineyard takes its name from the vineyards in this area, since this suburb was originally part of Windsor's winegrowing district.

The first vineyard was set up by John Paul Ouvrier (he changed his name from "Jean Pierre Ouvrier" to John Paul when he became a Naturalised Australian citizen in 1860), who had immigrated from France with his 2 sons around the 1830s.

== Transport ==
Vineyard is situated between the Richmond Road running from Blacktown to Richmond, and the Windsor Road running from Windsor to North Parramatta. During 2006 and 2007, Windsor Road underwent a major upgrade to four lanes.

Vineyard railway station is on the Richmond branch between Blacktown and Richmond. It provides regular commuter electric train services in both directions.
