= AVJennings =

Australian home building company

- Type: Subsidiary
- Traded as: ASX: AVJ; SGX: A05
- Industry: Home construction
- Founded: 1932
- Founders: Albert Victor Jennings
- Headquarters: Hawthorn, Victoria
- Area served: Australia
- Key people: David McKeown (CEO)
- Products: Houses
- Revenue: $320 million (2024)
- Net income: $19 million (2024)
- Parent: NEX Group
- Website: www.avjennings.com.au

AVJennings is a home construction company in Australia. Formerly listed on the Australian Securities Exchange and Singapore Exchange, it is a subsidiary of the Avid Property Group.

== History ==
AVJennings was founded by Albert Victor Jennings in 1932. In 1950, it was listed on the Australian Securities Exchange. It became a dual listed company with a listing on the Singapore Exchange.

In 1970, Jennings entered into a joint venture with American conglomerate Kaiser Industries and the Aetna Life & Casualty Company to form Kaiser Aetna Jennings. The partnership established multiple industrial estates in Melbourne and Sydney before ending due to managerial clashes in 1971.

In April 2000, majority shareholder MPH Group launched a takeover offer to acquire the 27% of share in AVJennings that it did not already own. At the end of the process it MPH ended up with a 93% shareholding. In March 2001, MPH began proceedings to compulsorily acquire the remaining shares.

In August 2010, AVJennings' contract building division was sold to Sekisui House leaving it to focus on land and residential developments.

In August 2025, AVJennings was taken over by Avid Property Group and delisted.

== See also ==
- Barclay Mowlem
