= Windsor Downs =

- Suburb
- Interactive map of Windsor Downs
- Coordinates: 33°39′25″S 150°48′36″E
- Country: Australia
- State: New South Wales
- City: Sydney
- LGA: City of Hawkesbury
- Location: 53 km (33 mi) from Sydney CBD
- Established: 1990

Government
  - State electorate: Hawkesbury
  - Federal division: Macquarie
- Elevation: 26 m (85 ft)

Population
  - Total: 1,183 (2021 census)
- Postcode: 2756
Suburbs around Windsor Downs
South Windsor	Bligh Park	Mulgrave
Londonderry	Windsor Downs	Mulgrave
Berkshire Park	Marsden Park	Marsden Park

Windsor Downs is a suburb of Western Sydney, within the City of Hawkesbury in the state of New South Wales, Australia, established in the early 1990s. The suburb is located 53 km north west from the CBD of Sydney. Windsor Downs is located alongside the Windsor Downs Nature Reserve and is the entrance point for several of the trails.

== Demographics ==
According to the 2021 census, there were 1,183 residents in Windsor Downs.

- 51.9% of the population was male, while 48.1% were female
- The most common ancestries were Australian (34.9%), English (32.9%), Maltese (12.8%), Irish (8.6) and Scottish (6%)
- 84% of people only spoke English at home. The most common languages outside of English were Maltese (1.4%), Polish (1.2%), Croatian (1.1%), Hindi (1.0%) and Italian (0.8%).
- The most common religions reported were Catholic (40.9%), Anglican (19%), No Religion (18.9%), Christian, not further defined (4.4%) and Not Stated (3.9%).
