= Tony Johnson (Australian politician) =

Australian politician

New South Wales Legislative Assembly
- In office 1981–1983
- Constituency: Riverstone
- In office 1973–1981
- Constituency: Mount Druitt

Personal details
- Born: Anthony Valentine Patrick Johnson; 31 August 1924
- Died: 31 May 2001 (aged 76)
- Party: Australian Labor Party
- Occupation: Politician

Anthony Valentine Patrick Johnson (31 August 1924 – 31 May 2001) was an Australian politician. He was a member of the New South Wales Legislative Assembly between 1973 and 1983.

== Parliamentary career ==
In 1973 Johnson was elected to the New South Wales Legislative Assembly for the seat of Mount Druitt. In 1981 he was elected to the seat of Riverstone, where he remained until leaving Parliamentary service in 1983.

Johnson died in 2001 at the age of 76. He is buried beside his wife, Cecily 'Cec' Maria Johnson at Pine Grove Memorial Park.

New South Wales Legislative Assembly
Preceded by Jim Southee	Member for Mount Druitt; 1973 – 1981	Succeeded by Abolished
Preceded by New seat	Member for Riverstone; 1981 – 1983	Succeeded by Richard Amery
