= South Windsor, New South Wales =

South Windsor
- Suburb
- Interactive map of South Windsor
- Coordinates: 33°37′31″S 150°48′16″E
- Country: Australia
- State: New South Wales
- LGA: City of Hawkesbury
- Location: 59.5 km (37.0 mi) from Sydney CBD

Government
  - State electorate: Hawkesbury
  - Federal division: Macquarie
- Elevation: 20 m (66 ft)

Population
  - Total: 5,948 (SAL 2021)
- Postcode: 2756
Suburbs around South Windsor
Richmond	Windsor	Windsor
Richmond	South Windsor	Mulgrave
Londonderry	Bligh Park	Mulgrave

South Windsor is a suburb of the town of Windsor in north west Sydney in the state of New South Wales, Australia. It is generally bounded in the west by Rickabys Creek and in the east by South Creek, both tributaries of the Hawkesbury River. It is also home of Bede Polding College, a Catholic secondary school.

South Windsor was previously called "Newtown"; the new name of "South Windsor" was assigned on 10 September 2004.

== Demographics ==
The population is somewhat younger than the bulk of the country. In the 2021 census, the median age of people in South Windsor was 34 years, compared to the national median of 38 years. Children aged under 15 years made up 20.6% of the population, and people aged 65 years and over made up 13.3% of the population.

The majority of residents (78.9%) were born in Australia, compared to the national average of 66.9%; the next most common countries of birth were England 3.0%, India 1.7%, New Zealand 1.6%, Philippines 1.5% and Scotland 0.5%.
