= Castlereagh Nature Reserve =

Nature reserve in New South Wales, Australia

- IUCN category Ia (strict nature reserve)
- Location within New South Wales
- Location: New South Wales
- Nearest city: Castlereagh
- Coordinates: 33°40′53″S 150°45′22″E
- Area: 4.95 km^{2} (1.91 sq mi)
- Established: December 1995
- Governing body: NSW National Parks & Wildlife Service
- Website: http://www.environment.nsw.gov.au/NationalParks/parkHome.aspx?id=N0715

The Castlereagh Nature Reserve is a protected nature reserve located in the western suburbs of Sydney in New South Wales, Australia. The 495-hectare (1,220-acre) reserve is situated 60 kilometres (37 mi) west of the central business district, approximately 10 kilometres (6.2 mi) north-east of Penrith and located near the townships of Castlereagh and Londonderry. In 1960, 266 hectares (660 acres) was reclaimed for use as a Child Welfare Training School, and in 1971, 389 hectares (960 acres) was reclaimed for the establishment of a liquid waste disposal facility.

The boundary of the reserve is marked by The Northern Road to the west, by Llandilo Road to the east, rural properties to the south and by the Castlereagh Waste Management Centre to the north. The nature reserve was formerly Castlereagh State Forest and was managed as a production forest from 1917 to 1988, then as a demonstration forest from 1988 to 1995.

== Features ==
=== Geology ===
The Castlereagh Nature Reserve contains a geographically restricted substrate of Tertiary alluvials producing clays, sand, gravel and shales at depth. Parts of the reserve support Cumberland Plain Woodland vegetation. The nature reserve is between 30 and 40 metres (98 and 131 ft) above sea level and is predominantly flat with broad, shallow depressions forming a sparse drainage network. Small, shallow lakes form after wet weather to the north of the reserve where gravels and other alluvials have been extracted when the reserve was a production forest.

=== Flora ===
Open forest occurs on clay soils and is dominated by broad-leaved ironbark Eucalyptus fibrosa sap. Fibrosa with occasional mugga ironbark Eucalyptus sideroxylon, thin-leaved stringybark Eucalyptus enugeniodes, woollybutt Eucalyptus longifolia and scribbly gum Eucalyptus sclerophylla. Threatened plant species found in the nature reserve include Dillwynia tenuifolia, Pultenea parviflora, Acacia bynoeana, dwarf casuarina Allocasuarina glareicola, nodding geebung Persoonia nutans and Micromyrtus minutiflora.

The reserve is relatively free of significant weed infestations. A few slash pines Pinus elliotti are found in the northern section of the reserve from when 300 hectares (740 acres) of Castlereagh State Forest was used for trial plantings of pines in the 1920s and 1930s. Heavy harvesting of ironbark during the Second World War, illegal timber collection and numerous fires generally thinned the forest, resulting in no mature trees in some areas.

=== Fauna ===
The nature reserve is home to a diverse range of mammals including sugar gliders, Petaurus breviceps; brush-tailed possum, Trichosurus vulpecula; and eastern grey kangaroo, Macropus giganteus. The eastern brown snake, Pseudonaja textilis; red-bellied black snake, Psuedechris porphriacus; lace monitor, Varanus varius; and a number of frog species including the endangered green and golden bell frog, Litoria aurea; also reside within the reserve.

== Environmental impacts ==
In 1987 the area around the old gravel pits was planted with over 3,000 seedlings but ultimately the plantings were unsuccessful. Due to past logging and other plantings, parts of the reserve are dominated by immature regrowth and has modified species composition and abundance.

An area of 1 hectare (2.5 acres) to the north western boundary of the nature reserve adjacent to the Castlereagh Waste Management Centre was previously used as an area for the disposal of heavy metals including zinc, cadmium and lead. The contaminated soil was removed in 1996 and replaced with clean local fill. Groundwater quality is monitored at six sampling stations by Waste Services.

Fire has been a major factor in shaping the flora in the reserve. The last major fire occurred in 1982 and burnt over 75 percent of the reserve, which has altered the understory of the forest and woodland communicates. Subsequently, a fire in November 2016 that started near The Northern Road Londonderry burnt through 336 ha of the nature reserve and was contained at Government Road, Berkshire Park.

== Accidents ==
In 1957 a Vampire fighter jet crashed into Castlereagh State Forest however the Flying Officer was able to eject safely.

== See also ==
- Protected areas of New South Wales
