= Richard Amery =

Australian politician

The Honourable Richard Amery
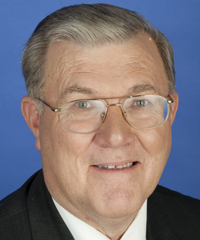

Member of the New South Wales Parliament for Mount Druitt
- In office 25 May 1991 – 6 March 2015
- Preceded by: Seat recreated
- Succeeded by: Edmond Atalla

Member of the New South Wales Parliament for Riverstone
- In office 22 October 1983 – 3 May 1991
- Preceded by: Tony Johnson
- Succeeded by: John Aquilina

Personal details
- Born: Richard Sanderson Amery; 31 March 1951 (age 75) Liverpool, New South Wales
- Party: Labor Party
- Occupation: Police officer

Richard Sanderson Amery (born 31 March 1951) is an Australian former politician. He was a Labor Party member of the New South Wales Legislative Assembly from 1983 to 2015, representing the electorates of Riverstone (1983–1991) and Mount Druitt (1991–2015).

== Early career ==
Prior to entering politics, Amery spent several years in the retail industry before becoming a police officer with New South Wales Police, where he served for 13 years. At the time he resigned to take up his political work he was a senior constable.

== Parliamentary career ==
Amery was the Minister for Agriculture from 1995 to 1997, when he was allocated additional responsibilities as Minister for Land and Water Conservation. He served as minister in both portfolios until 2001, when the Land and Water Conservation was allocated to another minister and Amery took on Corrective Services.

Amery returned to the backbench following the 2003 election, as part of a larger reshuffle which also saw the departure of Ministers John Aquilina (who became Speaker) and Paul Whelan (who retired from Parliament).

As the longest-serving member of the New South Wales Legislative Assembly, Amery is bestowed a colloquial title, Father of the House. On 8 August 2014 Richard Amery announced that he would leave politics at the next NSW state election in 2015. Father of the House Richard Amery (Mount Druitt) retired from parliament in 2015.

== Notes ==
New South Wales Legislative Assembly
Preceded by Tony Johnson	Member for Riverstone; 1983–1991	Succeeded by John Aquilina
Preceded by District recreated	Member for Mount Druitt; 1991–2015	Succeeded by Edmond Atalla
Political offices
Preceded by Ian Causley	Minister for Agriculture; 1995–2003	Succeeded by Ian Macdonald
Preceded by Kim Yeadon	Minister for Land and Water Conservation; 1997–2001	Succeeded by Craig Knowles as Minister for Natural Resources
Preceded by	Minister for Corrective Services; 2001–2003	Succeeded by
