= Members of the New South Wales Legislative Assembly, 2007–2011 =

Members of the New South Wales Legislative Assembly who served in the 54th parliament held their seats from 2007 to 2011. They were elected at the 2007 state election, and at by-elections. The Speaker was Richard Torbay.

Name	Party	Electorate	Term in office
Richard Amery	Labor	Mount Druitt	1983–2015
Marie Andrews	Labor	Gosford	1995–2011
Greg Aplin	Liberal	Albury	2003–2019
John Aquilina	Labor	Riverstone	1981–2011
Alan Ashton	Labor	East Hills	1999–2011
Stuart Ayres (Note: Penrith MLA Karyn Paluzzano was suspended from the Labor Party on 6 May 2010 after being found to have lied to the Independent Commission Against Corruption. She subsequently resigned from parliament on 7 May. Liberal candidate Stuart Ayres won the resulting by-election on 19 June.)	Liberal	Penrith	2010–2023
Mike Baird	Liberal	Manly	2007–2017
Craig Baumann	Liberal	Port Stephens	2007–2015
Diane Beamer	Labor	Mulgoa	1995–2011
Gladys Berejiklian	Liberal	Willoughby	2003–2021
Peter Besseling (Note: Port Macquarie independent MLA Rob Oakeshott resigned on 13 August 2008 in order to contest a federal by-election for the seat of Lyne. Independent candidate Peter Besseling won the resulting by-election on 18 October.)	Independent	Port Macquarie	2008–2011
David Borger	Labor	Granville	2007–2011
Matt Brown	Labor	Kiama	1999–2011
Linda Burney	Labor	Canterbury	2003–2016
Cherie Burton	Labor	Kogarah	1999–2015
David Campbell	Labor	Keira	1999–2011
Steve Cansdell	National	Clarence	2003–2011
Barry Collier	Labor	Miranda	1999–2011; 2013–2015
Andrew Constance	Liberal	Bega	2003–2021
Robert Coombs	Labor	Swansea	2007–2011
Geoff Corrigan	Labor	Camden	2003–2011
Phil Costa	Labor	Wollondilly	2007–2011
Michael Daley	Labor	Maroubra	2005–present
Angela D'Amore	Labor	Drummoyne	2003–2011
Peter Debnam	Liberal	Vaucluse	1994–2011
Victor Dominello (Note: Ryde Labor MLA and outgoing Deputy Premier John Watkins resigned on 12 September 2008. Liberal candidate Victor Dominello won the resulting by-election on 18 October.)	Liberal	Ryde	2008–2023
Peter Draper	Independent	Tamworth	2003–2011
Dawn Fardell	Independent	Dubbo	2004–2011
Verity Firth	Labor	Balmain	2007–2011
Andrew Fraser	National	Coffs Harbour	1990–2019
Robert Furolo (Note: Lakemba Labor MLA and outgoing Premier Morris Iemma resigned on 19 September 2008. Labor candidate Robert Furolo won the resulting by-election on 18 October.)	Labor	Lakemba	2008–2015
Tanya Gadiel	Labor	Parramatta	2003–2011
Thomas George	National	Lismore	1999–2019
Paul Gibson	Labor	Blacktown	1988–2011
Pru Goward	Liberal	Goulburn	2007–2019
Kevin Greene	Labor	Oatley	1999–2011
Shelley Hancock	Liberal	South Coast	2003–2023
David Harris	Labor	Wyong	2007–2011; 2015–present
Chris Hartcher	Liberal	Terrigal	1988–2015
Noreen Hay	Labor	Wollongong	2003–2016
Brad Hazzard	Liberal	Wakehurst	1991–2023
Kerry Hickey	Labor	Cessnock	1999–2011
Sonia Hornery	Labor	Wallsend	2007–present
Katrina Hodgkinson	National	Burrinjuck	1999–2017
Judy Hopwood	Liberal	Hornsby	2002–2011
Kevin Humphries	National	Barwon	2007–2019
Morris Iemma	Labor	Lakemba	1991–2008
Virginia Judge	Labor	Strathfield	2003–2011
Kristina Keneally	Labor	Heffron	2003–2012
Malcolm Kerr	Liberal	Cronulla	1984–2011
Ninos Khoshaba	Labor	Smithfield	2007–2011
Phil Koperberg	Labor	Blue Mountains	2007–2011
Nick Lalich (Note: Cabramatta Labor MLA Reba Meagher resigned on 16 September 2008. Labor candidate Nick Lalich won the resulting by-election on 18 October.)	Labor	Cabramatta	2008–2023
Paul Lynch	Labor	Liverpool	1995–2023
Daryl Maguire	Liberal	Wagga Wagga	1999–2018
Gerard Martin	Labor	Bathurst	1999–2011
Grant McBride	Labor	The Entrance	1992–2011
Andrew McDonald	Labor	Macquarie Fields	2007–2015
Jodi McKay	Labor	Newcastle	2007–2011; 2015–2021
Paul McLeay	Labor	Heathcote	2003–2011
Lylea McMahon	Labor	Shellharbour	2007–2011
Reba Meagher	Labor	Cabramatta	1994–2008
Alison Megarrity	Labor	Menai	1999–2011
Wayne Merton	Liberal	Baulkham Hills	1988–2011
Matthew Morris	Labor	Charlestown	2003–2011
Clover Moore	Independent	Sydney	1988–2012
Jonathan O'Dea	Liberal	Davidson	2007–2023
Barry O'Farrell	Liberal	Ku-ring-gai	1995–2015
Rob Oakeshott	Independent	Port Macquarie	1996–2008
Don Page	National	Ballina	1988–2015
Karyn Paluzzano	Labor	Penrith	2003–2010
Paul Pearce	Labor	Coogee	2003–2011
Barbara Perry	Labor	Auburn	2001–2015
Adrian Piccoli	National	Murrumbidgee	1999–2017
Greg Piper	Independent	Lake Macquarie	2007–present
Geoff Provest	National	Tweed	2007–present
Nathan Rees	Labor	Toongabbie	2007–2015
Michael Richardson	Liberal	Castle Hill	1993–2011
Anthony Roberts	Liberal	Lane Cove	2003–present
Frank Sartor	Labor	Rockdale	2003–2011
Allan Shearan	Labor	Londonderry	2003–2011
Jillian Skinner	Liberal	North Shore	1994–2017
Greg Smith	Liberal	Epping	2007–2015
George Souris	National	Upper Hunter	1988–2015
Tony Stewart	Labor	Bankstown	1995–2011
Rob Stokes	Liberal	Pittwater	2007–2023
Andrew Stoner	National	Oxley	1999–2015
Carmel Tebbutt	Labor	Marrickville	2005–2015
Frank Terenzini	Labor	Maitland	2007–2011
Richard Torbay	Independent	Northern Tablelands	1999–2013
Joe Tripodi	Labor	Fairfield	1995–2011
John Turner	National	Myall Lakes	1988–2011
Russell Turner	National	Orange	1996–2011
John Watkins	Labor	Ryde	1995–2008
Graham West	Labor	Campbelltown	2001–2011
Steve Whan	Labor	Monaro	2003–2011
John Williams	National	Murray-Darling	2007–2015
Ray Williams	Liberal	Hawkesbury	2007–present

== See also ==
- Second Iemma ministry
- Rees ministry
- Keneally ministry
- Results of the 2007 New South Wales state election (Legislative Assembly)
- Candidates of the 2007 New South Wales state election
