= Electoral results for the district of Port Macquarie =

Australian district election results

Port Macquarie, an electoral district of the Legislative Assembly in the Australian state of New South Wales, was established in 1988.

== Members for Port Macquarie ==
Member	Party	Term
Bruce Jeffery	National	1988–1991
Wendy Machin	National	1991–1996
Rob Oakeshott	National	1996–2002
Rob Oakeshott	Independent	2002–2008
Peter Besseling	Independent	2008–2011
Leslie Williams	National	2011–2020
Leslie Williams	Liberal	2020–2025
Robert Dwyer	Liberal	2025–present

== Election results ==
=== Elections in the 2020s ===
==== 2025 by-election ====
2025 Port Macquarie state by-election
Party	Candidate	Votes	%	±%
Liberal	Robert Dwyer	18,752	36.2	−3.3
National	Sean Gleeson	16,101	31.1	+5.5
Independent	Warwick Yonge	6,370	12.3	+12.3
Greens	Stuart Watson	5,184	10.0	+3.5
Legalise Cannabis	Megan Mathew	3,695	7.1	+3.0
Libertarian	Breelin Coetzer	1,712	3.3	+2.1
Total formal votes		51,814	96.5	−0.6
Informal votes		1,858	3.5	+0.6
Turnout		53,672	84.8	−5.1
Two-candidate-preferred result
Liberal	Robert Dwyer	22,273	53.5	−7.3
National	Sean Gleeson	19,387	46.5	+7.3
Liberal hold		Swing	−7.3	

==== 2023 ====
2023 New South Wales state election: Port Macquarie
Party	Candidate	Votes	%	±%
Liberal	Leslie Williams	21,044	39.5	+39.5
National	Peta Pinson	13,675	25.6	−37.9
Labor	Keith McMullen	10,265	19.2	−4.1
Greens	Stuart Watson	3,473	6.5	−1.4
Legalise Cannabis	Vivian McMahon	2,212	4.1	+4.1
Informed Medical Options	Silvia Mogorovich	1,229	2.3	+2.3
Sustainable Australia	Edward Coleman	809	1.5	−3.7
Liberal Democrats	Benjamin Read	623	1.2	+1.2
Total formal votes		53,330	97.2	+0.7
Informal votes		1,559	2.8	−0.7
Turnout		54,889	89.9	+0.3
Notional two-party-preferred count
Liberal	Leslie Williams	28,044	66.7	+66.7
Labor	Keith McMullen	14,003	33.3	+3.4
Two-candidate-preferred result
Liberal	Leslie Williams	25,372	60.8	+60.8
National	Peta Pinson	16,379	39.2	−30.9
Member changed to Liberal from National				

=== Elections in the 2010s ===
==== 2019 ====
2019 New South Wales state election: Port Macquarie
Party	Candidate	Votes	%	±%
National	Leslie Williams	33,538	63.60	+1.51
Labor	Peter Alley	12,220	23.17	−0.93
Greens	Drusi Megget	4,119	7.81	−1.09
Sustainable Australia	Jan Burgess	2,858	5.42	+5.42
Total formal votes		52,735	96.40	−0.79
Informal votes		1,971	3.60	+0.79
Turnout		54,706	91.22	−0.30
Two-party-preferred result
National	Leslie Williams	34,725	70.27	+1.32
Labor	Peter Alley	14,690	29.73	−1.32
National hold		Swing	+1.32	

==== 2015 ====
2015 New South Wales state election: Port Macquarie
Party	Candidate	Votes	%	±%
National	Leslie Williams	30,567	62.1	+9.7
Labor	Kristy Quill	11,866	24.1	+18.4
Greens	Drusi Megget	4,384	8.9	+5.2
Christian Democrats	Ashley Prinable	1,572	3.2	+1.1
No Land Tax	Paul Grasso	845	1.7	+1.7
Total formal votes		49,234	97.2	−0.9
Informal votes		1,426	2.8	+0.9
Turnout		50,660	91.5	+1.6
Two-party-preferred result
National	Leslie Williams	31,699	69.0	−9.8
Labor	Kristy Quill	14,272	31.1	+9.8
National hold		Swing	−9.8	

==== 2011 ====
2011 New South Wales state election: Port Macquarie
Party	Candidate	Votes	%	±%
National	Leslie Williams	23,718	52.2	+32.7
Independent	Peter Besseling	16,601	36.5	−30.6
Labor	Peter Alley	2,573	5.7	−3.5
Greens	Drusi Megget	1,651	3.6	+0.9
Christian Democrats	Robert Waldron	937	2.1	+2.1
Total formal votes		45,480	98.1	−0.7
Informal votes		889	1.9	+0.7
Turnout		46,369	93.8	
Notional two-party-preferred count
National	Leslie Williams	26,830	78.7	+15.8
Labor	Peter Alley	7,242	21.3	−15.8
Two-candidate-preferred result
National	Leslie Williams	24,378	56.5	+34.7
Independent	Peter Besseling	18,774	43.5	−34.7
National gain from Independent		Swing	+34.7	

=== Elections in the 2000s ===
==== 2008 by-election ====
2008 Port Macquarie by-election Saturday 18 October
Party	Candidate	Votes	%	±%
Independent	Peter Besseling	15,003	35.94	+35.94
National	Leslie Williams	14,061	33.69	+14.24
Independent	Jamie Harrison	3,484	8.35	+8.35
Independent	Lisa Intemann	3,134	7.51	+7.51
Independent	James Langley	2,045	4.90	+4.90
Greens	Susie Russell	1,971	4.72	+1.97
Independent	Bob Sharpham	795	1.90	+1.90
Christian Democrats	Bob Waldron	514	1.23	+1.23
Independent	Tony Galati	417	1.00	+1.00
Independent	Grant Rogers	196	0.47	+0.47
Independent	Cameron Price	129	0.31	+0.31
Total formal votes		41,749	98.20	−0.54
Informal votes		765	1.26	+0.54
Turnout		42,514	88.21	−5.27
Two-candidate-preferred result
Independent	Peter Besseling	20,068	54.52	+54.52
National	Leslie Williams	16,741	45.48	+23.70
Independent hold		Swing	N/A	

Rob Oakeshott (Independent) resigned to successfully contest the federal seat of Lyne.

==== 2007 ====
2007 New South Wales state election: Port Macquarie
Party	Candidate	Votes	%	±%
Independent	Rob Oakeshott	28,523	67.1	+3.2
National	Leslie Williams	8,258	19.4	+0.9
Labor	Monica Hayes	3,886	9.1	−0.8
Greens	Susie Russell	1,170	2.8	−1.0
Against Further Immigration	Frank Reid	648	1.5	+0.9
Total formal votes		42,485	98.7	+0.1
Informal votes		542	1.3	−0.1
Turnout		43,027	93.5	
Notional two-party-preferred count
National	Leslie Williams	12,502	62.9	+5.3
Labor	Monica Hayes	7,369	37.1	−5.3
Two-candidate-preferred result
Independent	Rob Oakeshott	31,107	78.2	−3.7
National	Leslie Williams	8,661	21.8	+3.7
Independent hold		Swing	−3.7	

==== 2003 ====
2003 New South Wales state election: Port Macquarie
Party	Candidate	Votes	%	±%
Independent	Rob Oakeshott	30,659	69.8	+69.8
National	Charlie Fenton	6,416	14.6	−41.4
Labor	Robert Hough	3,697	8.4	−18.6
Greens	Susie Russell	1,599	3.6	+0.6
Christian Democrats	Kerry Medway	1,122	2.6	+2.6
Against Further Immigration	James McLeod	321	0.7	−0.8
Independent	Graeme Muldoon	141	0.3	+0.3
Total formal votes		43,955	98.8	+0.3
Informal votes		556	1.2	−0.3
Turnout		44,511	94.1	
Notional two-party-preferred count
National	Charlie Fenton	9,411	55.3	−11.3
Labor	Robert Hough	7,603	44.7	+11.3
Two-candidate-preferred result
Independent	Rob Oakeshott	34,146	82.8	+82.8
National	Charlie Fenton	7,079	17.2	−49.4
Member changed to Independent from National		Swing	N/A	

=== Elections in the 1990s ===
==== 1999 ====
1999 New South Wales state election: Port Macquarie
Party	Candidate	Votes	%	±%
National	Rob Oakeshott	22,471	56.0	+3.1
Labor	Maureen Riordan	10,815	27.0	−2.8
One Nation	Kim Sara	4,832	12.1	+12.1
Greens	Lorraine Andersons	1,219	3.0	−2.1
Against Further Immigration	Norm Dachs	606	1.5	+1.1
Citizens Electoral Council	Graeme Muldoon	151	0.4	+0.4
Total formal votes		40,094	98.4	+2.2
Informal votes		636	1.6	−2.2
Turnout		40,730	94.6	
Two-party-preferred result
National	Rob Oakeshott	23,919	66.6	+4.6
Labor	Maureen Riordan	11,990	33.4	−4.6
National hold		Swing	+4.6	

==== 1996 by-election ====
1996 Port Macquarie by-election Saturday 30 November
Party	Candidate	Votes	%	±%
National	Rob Oakeshott	17,293	46.71	−5.93
Independent	John Barrett	11,920	32.20	
Shooters	Chris Smith	2,528	6.83	
Against Further Immigration	John Hutchinson	2,273	6.14	
Greens	Susie Russell	1,919	5.18	+0.01
Independent	Peter Farrugia	603	1.63	
Independent	Berdinus Kooy	412	1.11	
	Grant Rogers	74	0.20	
Total formal votes		37,022	98.38	+2.23
Informal votes		536	1.43	−2.21
Turnout		37,558	88.53	−6.60
Two-candidate-preferred result
National	Rob Oakeshott	18,559	54.86	−6.82
Independent	John Barrett	15,268	45.14	
National hold		Swing	N/A	

Wendy Machin (National) resigned.

==== 1995 ====
1995 New South Wales state election: Port Macquarie
Party	Candidate	Votes	%	±%
National	Wendy Machin	19,175	52.6	−2.1
Labor	John Murphy	10,898	29.9	+7.4
Independent	Carl Lockwood	2,026	5.6	+5.6
Greens	Susie Russell	1,883	5.2	+5.2
Call to Australia	Daryl Stafford	952	2.6	+0.4
Environment Inds	Paul Conroy	869	2.4	+2.4
The Country Party	Steve Orr	621	1.7	+1.7
Total formal votes		36,424	96.4	+1.9
Informal votes		1,377	3.6	−1.9
Turnout		37,801	95.1	
Two-party-preferred result
National	Wendy Machin	21,068	61.7	−6.0
Labor	John Murphy	13,088	38.3	+6.0
National hold		Swing	−6.0	

==== 1991 ====
1991 New South Wales state election: Port Macquarie
Party	Candidate	Votes	%	±%
National	Wendy Machin	17,430	54.8	−15.1
Labor	John Murphy	7,172	22.5	−7.2
Independent	Bob Woodlands	5,572	17.5	+17.5
Democrats	Jan Tyrrell	958	3.0	+3.0
Call to Australia	Suzanne Trant-Fischer	700	2.2	+2.2
Total formal votes		31,832	94.5	−3.0
Informal votes		1,866	5.5	+3.0
Turnout		33,698	94.8	
Two-party-preferred result
National	Wendy Machin	19,617	67.7	−2.6
Labor	John Murphy	9,372	32.3	+2.6
National hold		Swing	−2.6	

=== Elections in the 1980s ===
==== 1988 ====
1988 New South Wales state election: Port Macquarie
Party	Candidate	Votes	%	±%
National	Bruce Jeffery	21,036	69.4	+24.9
Labor	John Murphy	9,284	30.6	+0.6
Total formal votes		30,320	97.8	−0.8
Informal votes		692	2.2	+0.8
Turnout		31,012	92.8	
National notional hold		Swing	+7.1	
