= 2025 Port Macquarie state by-election =

- 15 March 2025

Electoral district of Port Macquarie in the New South Wales Legislative Assembly
- Registered: 63,320

	First party	Second party
Candidate	Robert Dwyer	Sean Gleeson
Party	Liberal	National
Primary vote	18,752	16,101
Percentage	36.2%	31.1%
Swing	▼3.3	▲5.4
2CP	53.5%	46.5%
2CP swing	▼7.3	▲7.3
	Third party	Fourth party
Candidate	Warwick Yonge	Stuart Watson
Party	Independent	Greens
Primary vote	6,370	5,184
Percentage	12.3%	10.0%
Swing	▲12.3	▲3.5
- Results by postcode
MP before election
Leslie Williams
Liberal
Elected MP
Robert Dwyer
Liberal

The 2025 Port Macquarie state by-election was held on 15 March 2025 to elect the member for Port Macquarie in the New South Wales Legislative Assembly, following the resignation of Liberal Party MP Leslie Williams. Liberal candidate Robert Dwyer declared victory over Nationals candidate Sean Gleeson on 17 March 2025.

== Background ==
=== Seat details ===
Port Macquarie was created in 1988 following a redistribution with the majority of the seat being inherited from Oxley. Throughout the history of the Mid North Coast region, like the rest of northern New South Wales, has been a stronghold of support for conservative parties. The seat was held by the National Party until 2002, when sitting member Rob Oakeshott left the party to become an independent. Oakeshott resigned in 2008 to successfully enter federal politics at the Lyne by-election, and was succeeded by independent Peter Besseling at the 2008 Port Macquarie state by-election.

Besseling lost his seat at the 2011 state election to Nationals candidate Leslie Williams. Williams was re-elected in 2015 and 2019, increasing her primary vote on both occasions.

On 20 September 2020, Williams left the Nationals to join the Liberal Party, citing the "reckless and unreasonable behaviour" of Nationals leader John Barilaro in threatening to end the Coalition and move the party to the crossbench due to a disagreement over koala protections. The Nationals contested Port Macquarie at the 2023 state election, but Williams retained the seat for the Liberals with a two-candidate-preferred vote of 60.8%.

=== Resignation of Leslie Williams ===
On 22 January 2025, Williams announced that she would resign from parliament. She said she made the decision in order to be closer to her family in Western Australia after the death of her husband, Don Williams, in 2022. Her resignation officially came into effect on 31 January 2025.

== Key events ==
- 31 January 2025 − Williams resigns
- 10 February 2025 − Postal vote applications open
- 21 February 2025 − Close of electoral roll
- 21 February 2025 − Writ of election issued by the Speaker of the Legislative Assembly
- 27 February 2025 – Candidate nominations close
- 28 February 2025 − Declaration of nominations
- 8 March 2025 − Early voting begins
- 15 March 2025 − Polling day
- 2 April 2025 − Declaration of final results

== Candidates ==
Candidates are listed in the order they appeared on the ballot.

Party	Candidate	Background
National	Sean Gleeson	Beef cattle farmer
Liberal	Robert Dwyer	General manager of Laurieton United Services Club and Kew Country Club
Libertarian	Breelin Coetzer	Candidate for Port Macquarie-Hastings Council in 2024
Legalise Cannabis	Megan Mathew	
Greens	Stuart Watson	2023 state election and 2024 local elections candidate
Independent	Warwick Yonge	General practitioner and former National Party candidate for this election

=== Liberal ===
On 8 February 2025, Laurieton United Services Club and Kew Country Club general manager Robert Dwyer defeated real estate agent Luke Hadfield to win Liberal Party preselection.

=== National ===
On 9 February 2025, general practitioner Warwick Yonge was preselected by the Nationals as their candidate for the by-election. Three days later on 12 February 2025, the Nationals' Central Executive refused to endorse his candidacy without providing a public explanation. Nationals leader Dugald Saunders said Yonge had never been officially endorsed, and "further issues came to light" which made it "untenable from the perspective of Central Executive to actually endorse him as a candidate".

On 19 February 2025, beef cattle farmer Sean Gleeson was selected as the party's replacement candidate. Yonge announced on 27 February 2025 that he would contest the by-election as an independent.

=== Labor ===
Labor has traditionally polled poorly in Port Macquarie, only recording more that 40% of the two-party-preferred vote on one occasion (2003) since the seat was created in 1988, and the party chose not to contest the by-election.

== Results ==
2025 Port Macquarie state by-election
Party	Candidate	Votes	%	±%
Liberal	Robert Dwyer	18,752	36.2	−3.3
National	Sean Gleeson	16,101	31.1	+5.5
Independent	Warwick Yonge	6,370	12.3	+12.3
Greens	Stuart Watson	5,184	10.0	+3.5
Legalise Cannabis	Megan Mathew	3,695	7.1	+3.0
Libertarian	Breelin Coetzer	1,712	3.3	+2.1
Total formal votes		51,814	96.5	−0.6
Informal votes		1,858	3.5	+0.6
Turnout		53,672	84.8	−5.1
Two-candidate-preferred result
Liberal	Robert Dwyer	22,273	53.5	−7.3
National	Sean Gleeson	19,387	46.5	+7.3
Liberal hold		Swing	−7.3	

=== By polling place ===
Polling place	Primary vote						2CP vote	
Polling place	LIB	NAT	IND	GRN	LCA	LBT	LIB	NAT
Bonny Hills Hall	41.3%	27.1%	9.8%	12.1%	6.6%	3.1%	59.9%	40.1%
Camden Haven High	44.9%	26.6%	11.2%	7.4%	6.1%	3.8%	60.6%	39.4%
Coopernook Arts Hall	15.0%	57.0%	10.8%	6.5%	7.0%	3.2%	21.3%	78.7%
Dunbogan Jubilee Hall	54.2%	16.4%	7.6%	14.1%	6.5%	1.3%	74.5%	25.5%
Emerald Downs Comm Cntr	36.7%	31.0%	12.4%	9.9%	8.0%	2.0%	54.0%	46.0%
Grace Church Port Macquarie	27.4%	30.0%	12.7%	10.0%	10.0%	10.0%	47.3%	52.7%
Hannam Vale Public	26.5%	45.4%	4.9%	13.0%	5.9%	4.3%	37.0%	63.0%
Harrington Hall	31.6%	43.1%	9.0%	4.9%	7.2%	4.1%	41.5%	58.5%
Hastings Public	27.9%	22.1%	19.4%	16.3%	11.2%	3.2%	56.2%	43.8%
Johns River Hall	26.0%	42.8%	8.8%	10.7%	9.8%	1.9%	42.4%	57.6%
Kendall Comm Cntr	40.7%	23.0%	9.3%	11.4%	8.8%	6.8%	61.7%	38.3%
Lake Cathie Hall	31.5%	34.2%	11.6%	11.5%	7.0%	4.2%	49.3%	50.7%
Laurieton Arts Hall	42.4%	25.9%	8.1%	11.2%	9.2%	3.2%	61.5%	38.5%
Lord Howe Island Comm Hall								
Lorne Rec Cntr								
Moorland Hall								
Nth Haven Public								
Nth Shore RFS								
Port Mac Art and Craft Cntr								
Port Mac Lions Club								
Port Mac PCYC								
Port Mac Public								
Port Mac Sea Scout Hall								
St Columba School Port Mac								
St Josephs Regional Cllg Port Mac								
St Peter The Fisherman								
Tacking Pt Public								
Declared facility								
North Haven EVC								
Port Mac Central EVC								
Port Mac EM Office								
Port Mac EVC								
Port Mac West EVC								
Adelaide (SA)								
Sydney EVC								
Hobart (TAS)	80.0%	0.0%	10.0%	0.0%	10.0%	0.0%	100%	0.0%
Technology assisted voting (TAV)								
Melbourne (VIC)	25.0%	0.0%	0.0%	25.0%	50.0%	0.0%	100%	0.0%
Enrolment/Provisional								
Postal votes								

== See also ==
- Electoral results for the district of Port Macquarie
- List of New South Wales state by-elections
