= Members of the New South Wales Legislative Assembly, 2023–2027 =

Members of the New South Wales Legislative Assembly who served in the 58th Parliament hold their seats from 2023 to 2027. They were elected at the 2023 state election on 25 March 2023.

== Members ==
Image	Name	Party	Electorate	Term in office
	Jenny Aitchison	Labor	Maitland	2015–present
	Rory Amon ^{[1]}	Liberal	Pittwater	2023–2024
	Kevin Anderson	National	Tamworth	2011–present
	Edmond Atalla	Labor	Mount Druitt	2015–present
	Tina Ayyad	Liberal	Holsworthy	2023–present
	Stephen Bali	Labor	Blacktown	2017–present
	Clayton Barr	Labor	Cessnock	2011–present
	Liza Butler	Labor	South Coast	2023–present
	Roy Butler	Independent	Barwon	2019–present
	Prue Car	Labor	Londonderry	2015–present
	Yasmin Catley	Labor	Swansea	2015–present
	Anoulack Chanthivong	Labor	Macquarie Fields	2015–present
	Justin Clancy	Liberal	Albury	2019–present
	Steph Cooke	National	Cootamundra	2017–present
	Sophie Cotsis	Labor	Canterbury	2016–present
	Mark Coure	Liberal	Oatley	2011–present
	Tim Crakanthorp	Labor	Newcastle	2014–present
	Matt Cross	Liberal	Davidson	2023–present
	Adam Crouch	Liberal	Terrigal	2015–present
	Michael Daley	Labor	Maroubra	2005–present
	Helen Dalton	Independent	Murray	2019–present
	Tanya Davies	Liberal	Badgerys Creek	2011–present
	Donna Davis	Labor	Parramatta	2023–present
	Stephanie Di Pasqua	Liberal	Drummoyne	2023–present
	Jihad Dib	Labor	Bankstown	2015–present
	Philip Donato	Independent	Orange	2016–present
	Trish Doyle	Labor	Blue Mountains	2015–present
	Robert Dwyer^{[2]}	Liberal	Port Macquarie	2025–present
	Julia Finn	Labor	Granville	2015–present
	Alex Greenwich	Independent	Sydney	2012–present
	James Griffin	Liberal	Manly	2017–present
	Nathan Hagarty	Labor	Leppington	2023–present
	Judy Hannan	Independent	Wollondilly	2023–present
	David Harris	Labor	Wyong	2007–2011, 2015–present
	Jodie Harrison	Labor	Charlestown	2014–present
	Jo Haylen	Labor	Summer Hill	2015–present
	Alister Henskens	Liberal	Wahroonga	2015–present
	Mark Hodges	Liberal	Castle Hill	2023–present
	Ron Hoenig	Labor	Heffron	2012–present
	Michael Holland	Labor	Bega	2022–present
	Sonia Hornery	Labor	Wallsend	2007–present
	Tim James	Liberal	Willoughby	2022–present
	Charishma Kaliyanda	Labor	Liverpool	2023–present
	Steve Kamper	Labor	Rockdale	2015–present
	Matt Kean	Liberal	Hornsby	2011–2024
	Michael Kemp	National	Oxley	2023–present
	Warren Kirby	Labor	Riverstone	2023–present
	Jordan Lane	Liberal	Ryde	2023–present
	Dave Layzell	National	Upper Hunter	2021–present
	Jenny Leong	Greens	Newtown	2015–present
	Jason Yat-Sen Li	Labor	Strathfield	2022–present
	Adam Marshall	National	Northern Tablelands	2013–2024
	Hugh McDermott	Labor	Prospect	2015–present
	Joe McGirr	Independent	Wagga Wagga	2018–present
	Katelin McInerney	Labor	Kiama	2025–present
	Karen McKeown	Labor	Penrith	2023–present
	David Mehan	Labor	The Entrance	2015–present
	Chris Minns	Labor	Kogarah	2015–present
	Brendan Moylan	National	Northern Tablelands	2024–present
	Marjorie O'Neill	Labor	Coogee	2019–present
	Ryan Park	Labor	Keira	2011–present
	Dominic Perrottet	Liberal	Epping	2011–2024
	Eleni Petinos	Liberal	Miranda	2015–present
	Greg Piper	Independent	Lake Macquarie	2007–present
	Robyn Preston	Liberal	Hawkesbury	2019–present
	Geoff Provest	National	Tweed	2007–present
	Sally Quinnell	Labor	Camden	2023–present
	Anthony Roberts	Liberal	Lane Cove	2003–present
	Michael Regan	Independent	Wakehurst	2023–present
	Janelle Saffin	Labor	Lismore	2019–present
	David Saliba	Labor	Fairfield	2023–present
	Dugald Saunders	National	Dubbo	2019–present
	Jacqui Scruby ^{[1]}	Independent	Pittwater	2024–present
	Paul Scully	Labor	Wollongong	2016–present
	Kobi Shetty	Greens	Balmain	2023–present
	Gurmesh Singh	National	Coffs Harbour	2019–present
	Kellie Sloane	Liberal	Vaucluse	2023–present
	Tamara Smith	Greens	Ballina	2015–present
	Mark Speakman	Liberal	Cronulla	2011–present
	Maryanne Stuart	Labor	Heathcote	2023–present
	Mark Taylor	Liberal	Winston Hills	2015–present
	Liesl Tesch	Labor	Gosford	2017–present
	Tanya Thompson	National	Myall Lakes	2023–present
	Paul Toole	National	Bathurst	2011–present
	Wendy Tuckerman	Liberal	Goulburn	2019–present
	Monica Tudehope	Liberal	Epping	2024–present
	Tri Vo	Labor	Cabramatta	2023–present
	Lynda Voltz	Labor	Auburn	2019–present
	James Wallace	Liberal	Hornsby	2024–present
	Gareth Ward^{[3]}	Independent	Kiama	2011–2025
	Greg Warren	Labor	Campbelltown	2015–present
	Kate Washington	Labor	Port Stephens	2015–present
	Anna Watson	Labor	Shellharbour	2011–present
	Steve Whan	Labor	Monaro	2003–2011, 2023–present
	Kylie Wilkinson	Labor	East Hills	2023–present
	Leslie Williams^{[2]}	Liberal	Port Macquarie	2011–2025
	Ray Williams	Liberal	Kellyville	2007–present
	Richie Williamson	National	Clarence	2023–present
	Felicity Wilson	Liberal	North Shore	2017–present

^{1} On 30 August 2024, the Liberal member for Pittwater, Rory Amon, resigned. Independent candidate Jacqui Scruby won the resulting by-election on 19 October 2024.

^{2} On 31 January 2025, the Liberal member for Port Macquarie, Leslie Williams, resigned. Liberal candidate Robert Dwyer won the resulting by-election on 15 March 2025.

^{3} On 8 August 2025, the Independent member for Kiama, Gareth Ward resigned prior to an expulsion vote after being convicted on four charges of sexual abuse.
