= Post-election pendulum for the 2007 New South Wales state election =

The following is a Mackerras pendulum for the New South Wales state election 2007.

"Safe" seats require a swing of over 10 per cent to change, "fairly safe" seats require a swing of between 6 and 10 points, while "marginal" seats require a swing of less than 6 points.

== Legislative Assembly ==
Changes in the pendulum since the 2007 election resulted through by-elections in the Labor held seats of Ryde in 2008 and Penrith in 2010. Both seats were won by the Liberal opposition in record swings against the Labor Government of 25 points in Penrith and 23 points in Ryde.

=== Pendulum ===
Labor seats
Marginal
Miranda	Barry Collier	ALP	0.8 points
Newcastle	Jodi McKay	ALP v IND	1.2 points
Maitland	Frank Terenzini	ALP v IND	2.0 points
Menai	Alison Megarrity	ALP	2.7 points
Wollondilly	Phil Costa	ALP	3.3 points
Balmain	Verity Firth	ALP v GRN	3.8 points
Camden	Geoff Corrigan	ALP	4.0 points
Gosford	Marie Andrews	ALP	4.9 points
The Entrance	Grant McBride	ALP	4.9 points
Fairly safe
Monaro	Steve Whan	ALP	6.3 points
Londonderry	Allan Shearan	ALP	6.9 points
Wyong	David Harris	ALP	6.9 points
Charlestown	Matthew Morris	ALP v IND	7.0 points
Coogee	Paul Pearce	ALP	7.2 points
Marrickville	Carmel Tebbutt	ALP v GRN	7.5 points
Drummoyne	Angela D'Amore	ALP	7.6 points
Heathcote	Paul McLeay	ALP	8.8 points
Safe
Riverstone	John Aquilina	ALP	10.1 points
Rockdale	Frank Sartor	ALP	10.3 points
Swansea	Robert Coombs	ALP	10.8 points
Blue Mountains	Phil Koperberg	ALP	11.1 points
Granville	David Borger	ALP	11.1 points
Macquarie Fields	Andrew McDonald	ALP	11.1 points
Mulgoa	Diane Beamer	ALP	11.1 points
Kiama	Matt Brown	ALP	12.0 points
Cessnock	Kerry Hickey	ALP	12.4 points
Bathurst	Gerard Martin	ALP	13.0 points
Parramatta	Tanya Gadiel	ALP	13.7 points
East Hills	Alan Ashton	ALP	14.1 points
Oatley	Kevin Greene	ALP	14.4 points
Toongabbie	Nathan Rees	ALP	14.5 points
Strathfield	Virginia Judge	ALP	15.1 points
Smithfield	Ninos Khoshaba	ALP	15.5 points
Wallsend	Sonia Hornery	ALP	15.8 points
Maroubra	Michael Daley	ALP	16.1 points
Kogarah	Cherie Burton	ALP	17.7 points
Campbelltown	Graham West	ALP	18.6 points
Very safe
Fairfield	Joe Tripodi	ALP	20.4 points
Shellharbour	Lylea McMahon	ALP v IND	21.6 points
Keira	David Campbell	ALP	22.0 points
Blacktown	Paul Gibson	ALP	22.3 points
Heffron	Kristina Keneally	ALP	23.7 points
Wollongong	Noreen Hay	ALP	25.3 points
Mount Druitt	Richard Amery	ALP	25.4 points
Bankstown	Tony Stewart	ALP	25.6 points
Liverpool	Paul Lynch	ALP	26.9 points
Canterbury	Linda Burney	ALP	27.1 points
Auburn	Barbara Perry	ALP	28.8 points
Cabramatta	Reba Meagher	ALP	29.0 points
Lakemba	Morris Iemma	ALP	34.0 points

Liberal/National seats
Marginal
Port Stephens	Craig Baumann	LIB	0.1 points
Goulburn	Pru Goward	LIB v IND	1.3 points
Tweed	Geoff Provest	NAT	3.0 points
Manly	Mike Baird	LIB v IND	3.4 points
Bega	Andrew Constance	LIB	5.1 points
Fairly safe
Hawkesbury	Ray Williams	LIB v IND	6.0 points
Barwon	Kevin Humphries	NAT v IND	6.2 points
South Coast	Shelley Hancock	LIB	7.8 points
Epping	Greg Smith	LIB	8.0 points
Terrigal	Chris Hartcher	LIB	8.4 points
Pittwater	Rob Stokes	LIB v IND	9.4 points
Safe
Murray-Darling	John Williams	NAT	10.1 points
Baulkham Hills	Wayne Merton	LIB	10.3 points
Lismore	Thomas George	NAT	10.5 points
Clarence	Steve Cansdell	NAT	11.6 points
Orange	Russell Turner	NAT V IND	11.7 points
Lane Cove	Anthony Roberts	LIB	12.4 points
Ryde	Victor Dominello	LIB	13.0 points
Wagga Wagga	Daryl Maguire	LIB	13.0 points
Ballina	Don Page	NAT	14.5 points
Willoughby	Gladys Berejiklian	LIB v IND	14.5 points
Upper Hunter	George Souris	NAT	14.7 points
North Shore	Jillian Skinner	LIB v GRN	15.8 points
Oxley	Andrew Stoner	NAT	15.9 points
Murrumbidgee	Adrian Piccoli	NAT	16.1 points
Vaucluse	Peter Debnam	LIB v GRN	16.1 points
Penrith	Stuart Ayres	LIB	16.48 points
Hornsby	Judy Hopwood	LIB	16.5 points
Wakehurst	Brad Hazzard	LIB	17.3 points
Myall Lakes	John Turner	NAT	17.4 points
Cronulla	Malcolm Kerr	LIB	17.5 points
Burrinjuck	Katrina Hodgkinson	NAT	17.6 points
Coffs Harbour	Andrew Fraser	NAT	17.6 points
Albury	Greg Aplin	LIB	19.0 points
Castle Hill	Michael Richardson	LIB	19.1 points
Very safe
Davidson	Jonathan O'Dea	LIB	24.7 points
Ku-ring-gai	Barry O'Farrell	LIB	29.0 points
Independent seats
Lake Macquarie	Greg Piper	IND v ALP	0.1 points
Dubbo	Dawn Fardell	IND v NAT	0.9 points
Port Macquarie	Peter Besseling	IND v NAT	4.5 points
Tamworth	Peter Draper	IND v NAT	4.8 points
Sydney	Clover Moore	IND v ALP	16.6 points
Northern Tablelands	Richard Torbay	IND v NAT	30.2 points

== Legislative Council ==
Labor MLC Michael Costa resigned on 22 September 2008. Unions NSW secretary John Robertson was nominated by Labor as his successor, and was formally appointed at a joint sitting of parliament on 28 October.

Gordon Moyes was appointed in 2002 as a member of the Christian Democratic Party to fill the casual vacancy caused by Elaine Nile's resignation from the Legislative Council. He was elected in 2003. Having been expelled from the party in March 2009, he sat as an independent until November 2009 when he joined the Family First Party.

Labor MLC Henry Tsang resigned effective 3 December 2009. Former Mayor of the City of Rockdale Shaoquett Moselmane was nominated by Labor as his successor, and was formally appointed at a joint sitting of parliament on 3 December.

On 7 June 2010, Labor Minister Ian Macdonald resigned from the Legislative Council after resigning from the ministry when it was discovered that he had mis-used taxpayer funds to fund a private holiday in Europe. In total, 12 of the 22 Ministers sworn in after the last State election have resigned or been replaced to date. Assistant general secretary of the NSW branch of the ALP Luke Foley was nominated by Labor as his successor, and was formally appointed at a joint sitting of parliament on 10 June 2010.

Greens MLC Lee Rhiannon resigned on 19 July 2010 to contest a seat for the Federal Senate at the 2010 election. The death of Shooters and Fishers Party MLC Roy Smith on 30 July 2010 and the resignations of Labor MLC John Della Bosca on 30 July and Greens MLC Sylvia Hale on 6 September left four vacancies, which were filled by Cate Faehrmann, Robert Borsak, Sophie Cotsis and David Shoebridge respectively on 7 September 2010.

=== Current balance ===
Party	Seats held		Current Council
Party	2007	Now	Current Council
Labor Party	19	19	
Liberal Party	10	10	
National Party	5	5	
The Greens	4	4	
Shooters and Fishers Party	2	2	
Christian Democratic Party	2	1	
Family First Party	0	1	
