= Electoral results for the district of Shellharbour =

Election results for Shellharbour, New South Wales, Australia

Shellharbour, an electoral district of the Legislative Assembly in the Australian state of New South Wales, was established in 2007 and has always been held by the Labor Party.

== Members for Shellharbour ==
Election	Member	Party
2007	Lylea McMahon	Labor
2011	Anna Watson	Labor
2015	Anna Watson	Labor
2019	Anna Watson	Labor
2023	Anna Watson	Labor

== Election results ==
=== Elections in the 2020s ===
==== 2023 ====
2023 New South Wales state election: Shellharbour
Party	Candidate	Votes	%	±%
Labor	Anna Watson	26,418	50.4	−7.2
Independent	Chris Homer	10,656	20.3	+20.3
Liberal	Mikayla Barnes	7,006	13.4	−13.8
Greens	Jamie Dixon	3,189	6.1	−3.3
Legalise Cannabis	Mia Willmott	2,246	4.3	+4.3
Liberal Democrats	Rita Granata	1,574	3.0	+3.0
Sustainable Australia	Kenneth Davis	1,306	2.5	−3.3
Total formal votes		52,395	96.2	+1.0
Informal votes		2,049	3.8	−1.0
Turnout		54,444	89.6	−2.5
Notional two-party-preferred count
Labor	Anna Watson	31,406	77.2	+8.8
Liberal	Mikayla Barnes	9,298	22.8	−8.8
Two-candidate-preferred result
Labor	Anna Watson	29,403	67.1	−1.3
Independent	Chris Homer	14,390	32.9	+32.9
Labor hold				

=== Elections in the 2010s ===
==== 2019 ====
2019 New South Wales state election: Shellharbour
Party	Candidate	Votes	%	±%
Labor	Anna Watson	31,532	57.50	+4.76
Liberal	Shane Bitschkat	14,924	27.21	+1.48
Greens	Jamie Dixon	5,158	9.41	+0.09
Sustainable Australia	Ken Davis	3,226	5.88	+5.88
Total formal votes		54,840	95.17	−0.40
Informal votes		2,783	4.83	+0.40
Turnout		57,623	91.60	−0.20
Two-party-preferred result
Labor	Anna Watson	34,435	68.27	+1.30
Liberal	Shane Bitschkat	16,005	31.73	−1.30
Labor hold		Swing	+1.30	

==== 2015 ====
2015 New South Wales state election: Shellharbour
Party	Candidate	Votes	%	±%
Labor	Anna Watson	26,897	52.7	+7.2
Liberal	Mark Jones	13,125	25.7	−6.0
Greens	Peter Moran	4,751	9.3	−5.2
Independent	Wayne Quinn	2,266	4.4	+4.4
Independent	Romeo Cecchele	1,596	3.1	+3.1
Christian Democrats	John Kadwell	1,489	2.9	−3.4
No Land Tax	Hugo Morvillo	875	1.7	+1.7
Total formal votes		50,999	95.6	+0.7
Informal votes		2,364	4.4	−0.7
Turnout		53,363	91.8	−0.7
Two-party-preferred result
Labor	Anna Watson	29,678	67.0	+9.2
Liberal	Mark Jones	14,640	33.0	−9.2
Labor hold		Swing	+9.2	

==== 2011 ====
2011 New South Wales state election: Shellharbour
Party	Candidate	Votes	%	±%
Labor	Anna Watson	20,459	46.7	−11.1
Liberal	Larissa Mallinson	13,766	31.4	+16.7
Greens	Peter Moran	6,700	15.3	+7.7
Christian Democrats	Jeff Dakers	2,880	6.6	+6.6
Total formal votes		43,805	95.3	−1.4
Informal votes		2,160	4.7	+1.4
Turnout		45,965	93.4	
Two-party-preferred result
Labor	Anna Watson	22,737	58.6	−13.0
Liberal	Larissa Mallinson	16,050	41.4	+41.4
Labor hold		Swing	−13.0	

=== Elections in the 2000s ===
==== 2007 ====
2007 New South Wales state election: Shellharbour
Party	Candidate	Votes	%	±%
Labor	Lylea McMahon	24,718	57.8	−3.0
Independent	Alex Darling	7,409	17.3	+17.3
Liberal	Stuart Wright	6,307	14.8	−0.9
Greens	Sonya McKay	3,242	7.6	−0.4
AAFI	Tibor Patakfalvy	1,076	2.5	+1.0
Total formal votes		42,752	96.7	+0.2
Informal votes		1,445	3.3	−0.2
Turnout		44,197	94.3	
Notional two-party-preferred count
Labor	Lylea McMahon	27,272	76.8	N/A
Liberal	Stuart Wright	8,236	23.2	N/A
Two-candidate-preferred result
Labor	Lylea McMahon	26,430	71.6	−5.2
Independent	Alex Darling	10,473	28.4	+28.4
Labor notional hold		Swing	−5.2	
