= 1996 Port Macquarie state by-election =

Election result for Port Macquarie, New South Wales, Australia

A by-election was held for the New South Wales Legislative Assembly electorate of Port Macquarie on 30 November 1996 following the retirement of sitting member, Wendy Machin (National).

== Results ==
1996 Port Macquarie by-election Saturday 30 November
Party	Candidate	Votes	%	±%
National	Rob Oakeshott	17,293	46.71	−5.93
Independent	John Barrett	11,920	32.20	
Shooters	Chris Smith	2,528	6.83	
AAFI	John Hutchinson	2,273	6.14	
Greens	Susie Russell	1,919	5.18	+0.01
Independent	Peter Farrugia	603	1.63	
Independent	Berdinus Kooy	412	1.11	
	Grant Rogers	74	0.20	
Total formal votes		37,022	98.38	+2.23
Informal votes		536	1.43	−2.21
Turnout		37,558	88.53	−6.60
Two-candidate-preferred result
National	Rob Oakeshott	18,559	54.86	−6.82
Independent	John Barrett	15,268	45.14	
National hold		Swing	N/A	

== See also ==
- Electoral results for the district of Port Macquarie
- List of New South Wales state by-elections
