= 2008 Ryde state by-election =

By-election in New South Wales, Australia

- 18 October 2008

Electoral district of Ryde in the Legislative Assembly
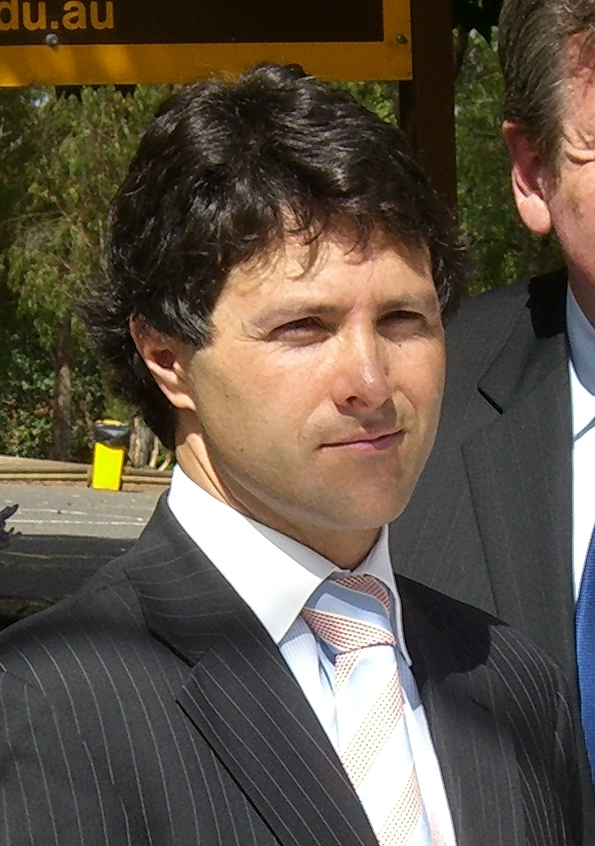

	First party	Second party	Third party
Candidate	Victor Dominello	Nicole Campbell	Lindsay Peters
Party	Liberal	Labor	Greens
Popular vote	21,370	11,725	4,407
Percentage	54.34%	29.81%	11.21%
Swing	▲25.74	▼15.03	▲3.34
TPP	63.01%	36.99%
TPP swing	▲23.10	▼23.10
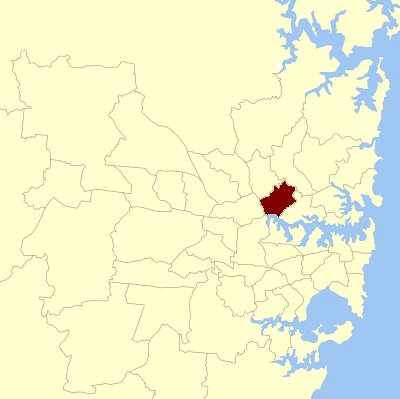
- Location in New South Wales
MP before election
John Watkins
Labor
Elected MP
Victor Dominello
Liberal

A by-election was held for the New South Wales Legislative Assembly seat of Ryde on 18 October 2008 to coincide with the Port Macquarie, Lakemba and Cabramatta by-elections. The by-election was triggered by the resignation of sitting member and Deputy Premier John Watkins, who cited exhaustion and the lack of time spent with his family for his resignation. Watkins resigned as Deputy Premier and Minister for Transport and retired from parliament on 8 September 2008, prompting a Cabinet reshuffle.

The by-election was won by Liberal candidate Victor Dominello on a swing of 23%. This was a marked turnaround to the result at the 2007 state election, when Watkins was reelected with 60.09% of the two-party preferred vote.

However, the writ was issued at a very bad time for the government. Labor had been sinking in the polls since being reelected a year earlier. It had suffered from several months of bad press that had driven its poll numbers downward. It was only polling at 44% support, a swing of almost 8% from the 2007 election. Additionally, Watkins' resignation had touched off a domino effect that ultimately resulted in Premier Morris Iemma leaving politics as well.

Watkins had held Ryde without interruption or serious difficulty since its re-creation in 1999, having held its predecessor seat of Gladesville since 1995. Labor sat on a margin of 10.1%, which would have been considered safe under normal conditions (any seat with a two-party margin greater than 10% is considered safe on paper). However, the seat had historically been marginal at the federal level. Combined with Labor's declining poll numbers, commentators thought it was vulnerable to being taken by the Liberals.

On paper, Dominello's victory turned Ryde from a safe Labor seat into a safe Liberal seat in one stroke. At the time, it was the largest swing against a sitting government in New South Wales history; it has since been outdone by the 2010 Penrith by-election (which saw a 25% swing against Labor) and the 2013 Miranda by-election (which saw a 26% swing against the Coalition).

The loss of Ryde significantly weakened the standing of Iemma's successor, Nathan Rees, who would himself be ousted in a party room coup a year later. It proved to be the beginning of the end for the Labor government, which would go on to suffer a landslide defeat at the 2011 state election.

== Dates ==
Date	Event
12 September 2008	Resignation of John Watkins.
22 September 2008	Writ of election issued by the Speaker of the Legislative Assembly and close of electoral rolls.
26 September 2008	Date of nomination
18 October 2008	Polling day
1 November 2008	Return of writ

== Results ==
2008 Ryde by-election
Party	Candidate	Votes	%	±%
Liberal	Victor Dominello	21,370	54.34	+25.74
Labor	Nicole Campbell	11,725	29.81	−15.03
Greens	Lindsay Peters	4,407	11.21	+3.34
Independent	Victor Taffa	1,171	2.98	+2.98
Democrats	Peter Goldfinch	656	1.67	+0.27
Total formal votes		39,329	97.96	+0.53
Informal votes		820	2.04	−0.53
Turnout		40,149	83.64	−9.33
Two-party-preferred result
Liberal	Victor Dominello	22,556	63.01	+23.10
Labor	Nicole Campbell	13,243	36.99	−23.10
Liberal gain from Labor		Swing	+23.10	

== See also ==
- Electoral results for the district of Ryde
- List of New South Wales state by-elections
