= 2011 New South Wales state election =

Elections to the 55th parliament of New South Wales

- 26 March 2011

All 93 seats in the New South Wales Legislative Assembly and 21 (of the 42) seats in the New South Wales Legislative Council 47 Assembly seats were needed for a majority
- Opinion polls
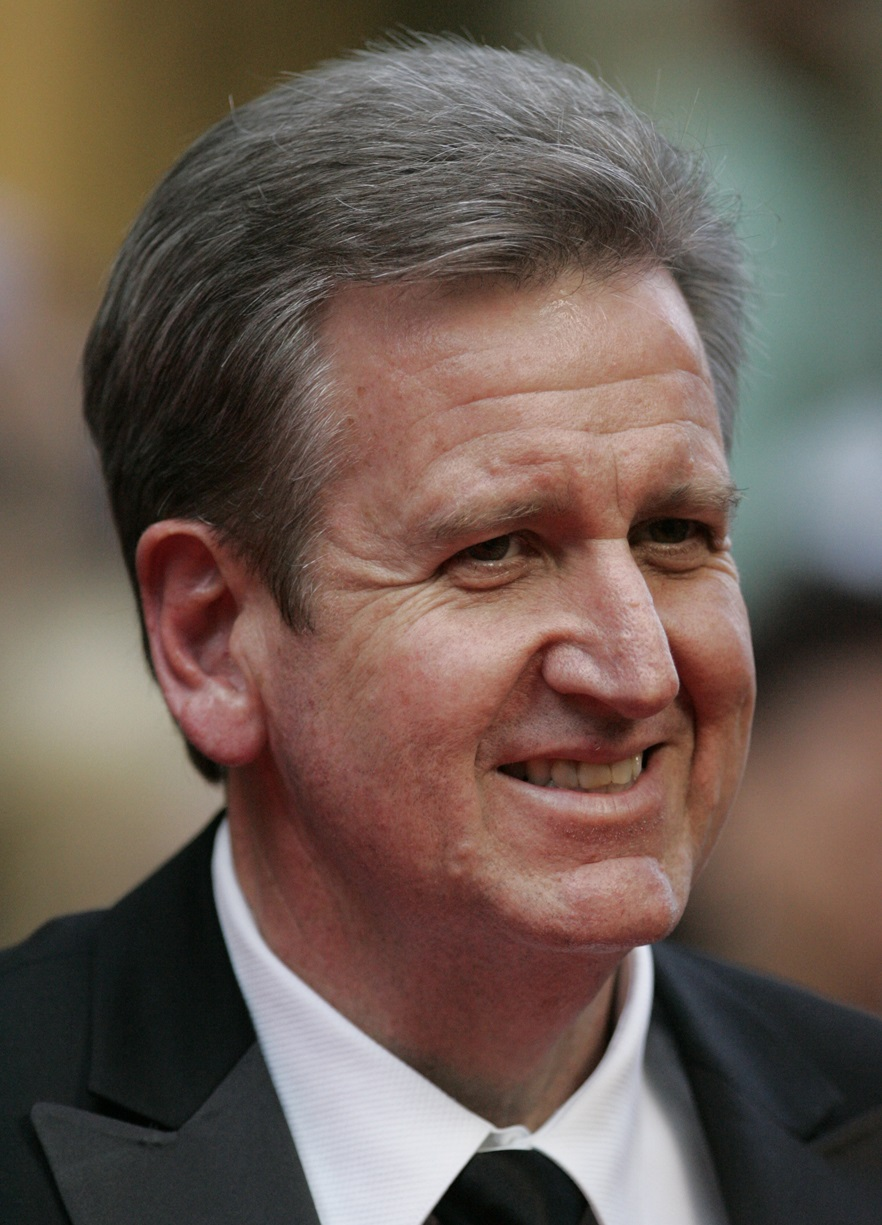

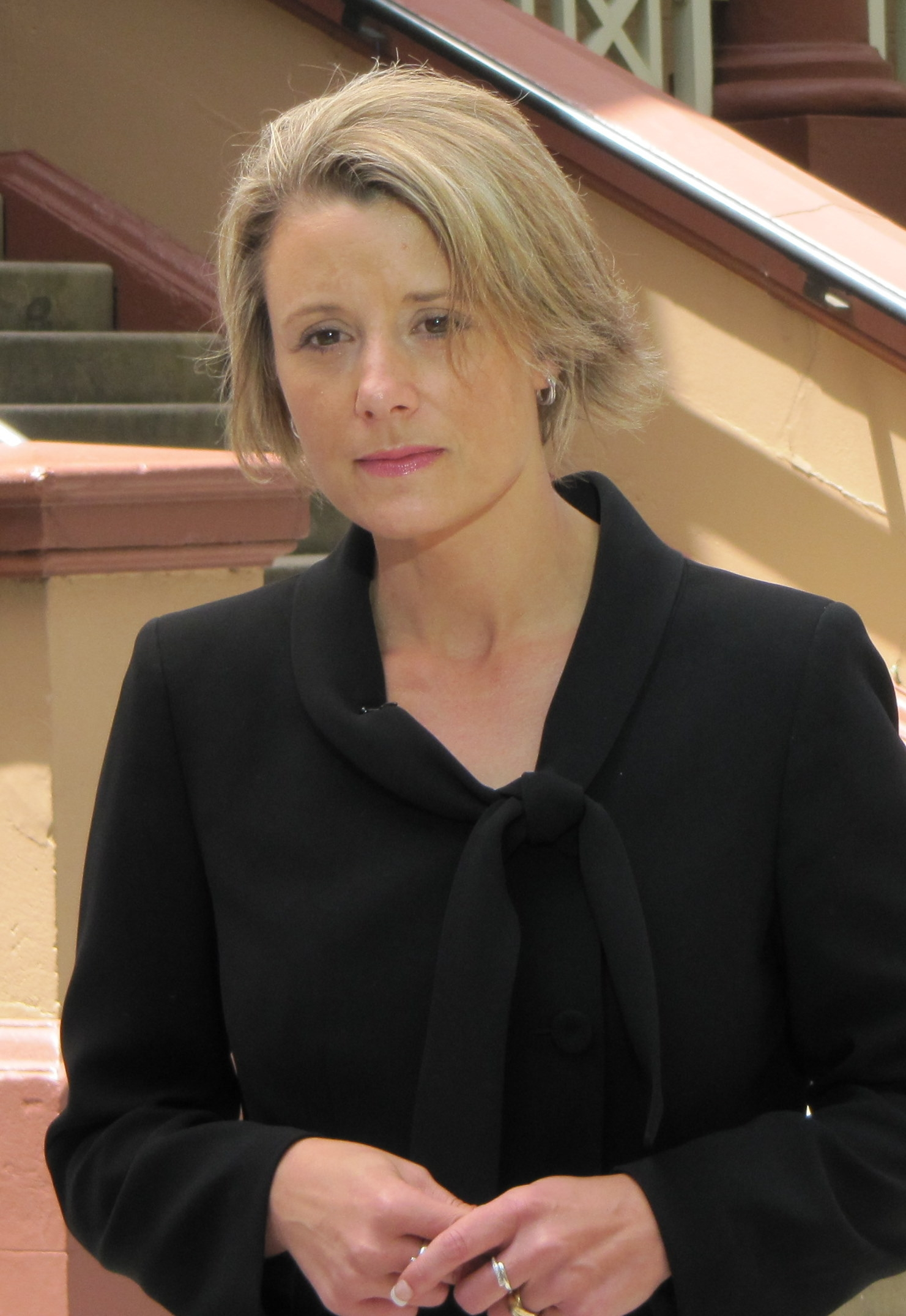

	First party	Second party	Third party
Leader	Barry O'Farrell	Kristina Keneally	No leader
Party	Liberal/National coalition	Labor	Greens
Leader since	4 April 2007	3 December 2009
Leader's seat	Ku-ring-gai	Heffron
Last election	35 seats	52 seats	0 seats
Seats before	37 seats	50 seats	0 seats
Seats won	69	20	1
Seat change	▲32	▼30	▲1
Popular vote	2,124,321	1,061,352	427,144
Percentage	51.15%	25.55%	10.29%
Swing	▲14.16	▼13.43	▲1.33
TPP	64.22%	35.78%
TPP swing	▲16.48	▼16.48
- Two-candidate-preferred margin by electorate
Premier before election
Kristina Keneally
Labor
Elected Premier
Barry O'Farrell
Liberal/National coalition

The 2011 New South Wales state election held on Saturday, 26 March 2011. The 16-year-incumbent Labor Party government led by Premier Kristina Keneally was defeated in a landslide by the Liberal–National Coalition opposition led by Barry O'Farrell.

Labor suffered a two-party swing of 16.4 points, the largest against a sitting government at any level in Australia since World War II. From 50 seats at dissolution, Labor was knocked down to 20 seats—the worst defeat of a sitting government in New South Wales history, and one of the worst of a state government in Australia since federation. The Coalition picked up a 32-seat swing to win a strong majority, with 69 seats–the largest majority government, in terms of percentage of seats controlled, in NSW history. It is only the third time since 1941 that a NSW Labor government has been defeated. It was also notable in that many of Labor's safest seats, such as Newcastle and Parramatta, were won by the Liberal Party on large swings. This election also saw the previous record for largest percentage of seats controlled by the Coalition, which won 74.2 percent of seats (69 out of 93 seats). The previous record for percentage of the legislature controlled was set by Neville Wran's Labor Party in the 1981 election, in which Labor won 69 out of 99 seats (69.7 percent).

New South Wales has compulsory voting, with an optional preferential ballot in single-member seats for the lower house and single transferable vote with optional preferential above-the-line voting in the proportionally represented upper house. The election was conducted by the New South Wales Electoral Commission (NSWEC).

Future premier Dominic Perrottet and future opposition leader Mark Speakman entered parliament at this election.

== Background ==
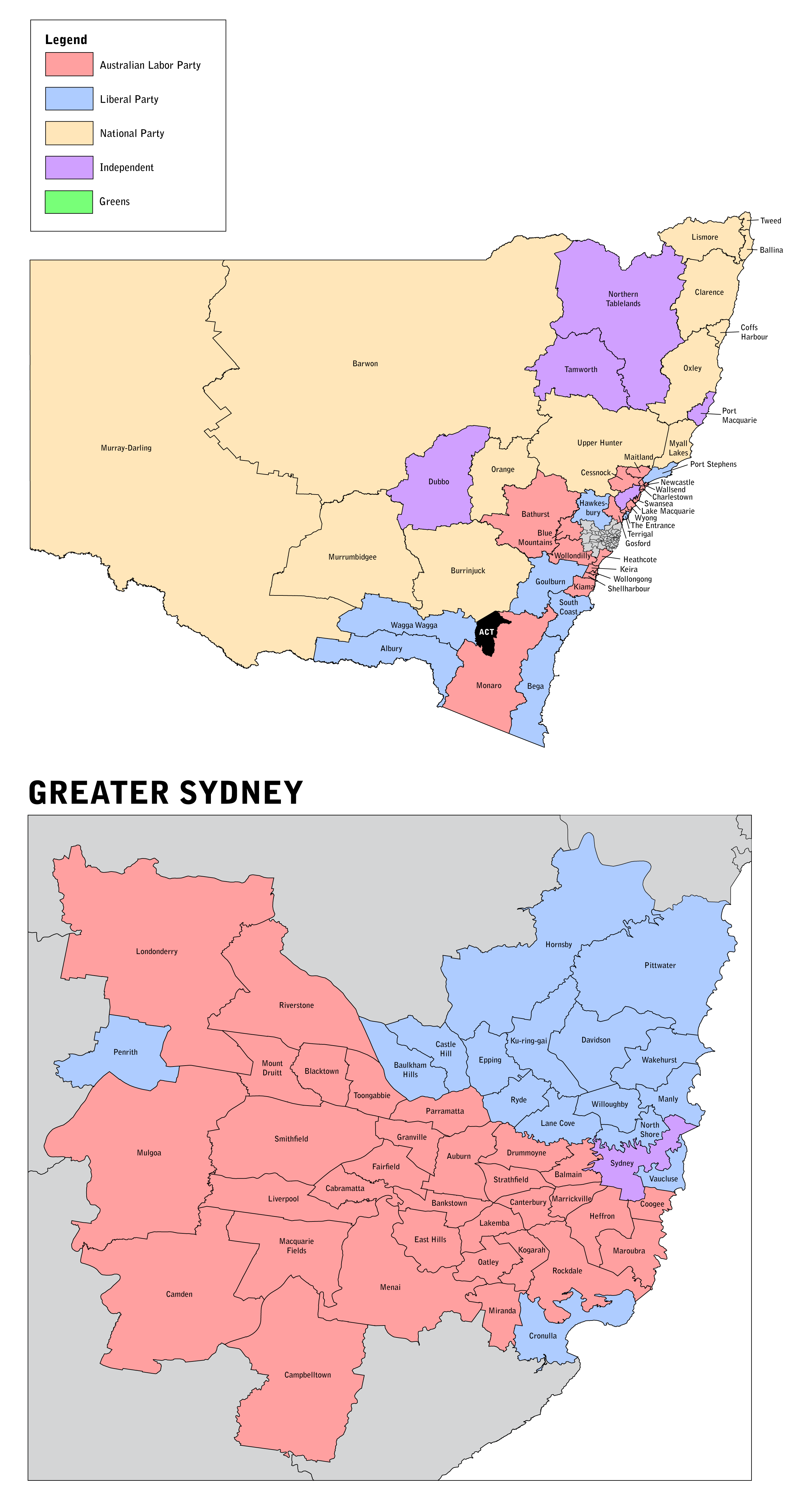
New South Wales electorates by party before the election

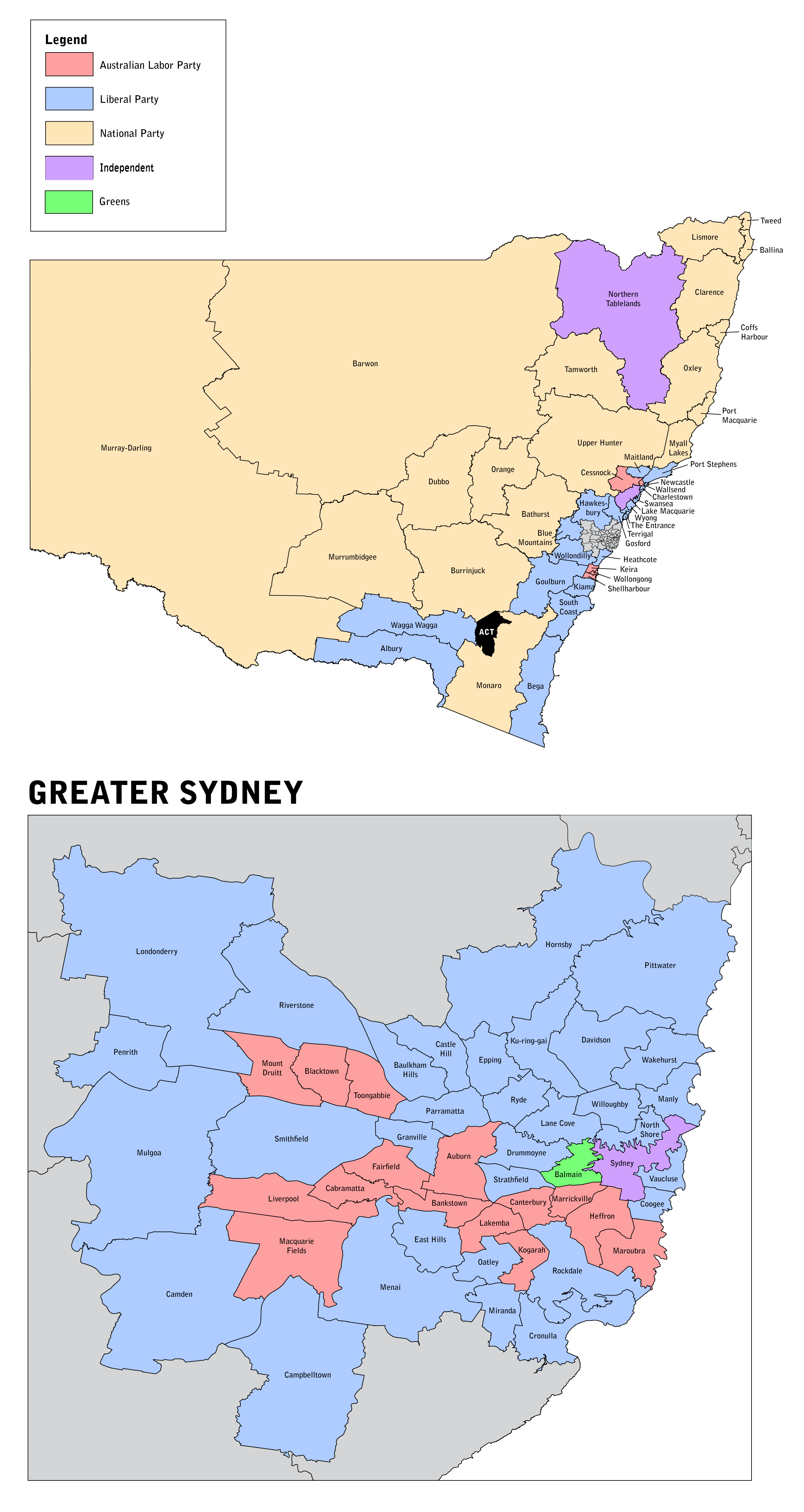
New South Wales electorates by party after the election

The centre-left Labor Party, led by Premier Kristina Keneally, and the centre-right Liberal Party, led by Leader of the Opposition Barry O'Farrell, were the two main parties in New South Wales. In the 2007 state election, of 93 seats total, Labor won 52 seats, the Liberals won 22 seats and the Nationals, led by Andrew Stoner, who are in coalition with the Liberals, won 13 seats. Six seats were retained by independents. Smaller parties which hold no seats in the lower house but achieved significant votes in 2007 include The Greens and the Christian Democratic Party.

On 18 October 2008, four state electorates (Lakemba, Ryde, Cabramatta, Port Macquarie) went to by-elections as a result of the resignation of the Premier, two of his ministers, and an independent who left after winning a federal by-election. The results in Ryde, Cabramatta, and Lakemba showed the largest by-election swing against Labor in its history. The results showed a significant swing towards the Liberal Party with a swing of 22.7 percentage points in former health minister Reba Meagher's seat of Cabramatta, but it was retained by ALP candidate Nick Lalich, and a swing of 13 points against Labor in former premier Morris Iemma's seat of Lakemba, also retained by an ALP candidate, Robert Furolo. Ryde, once a safe Labor seat, with a swing of 23.1 points delivered former deputy premier John Watkins' seat to Victor Dominello. Peter Besseling, the independent candidate, won Port Macquarie, left vacant after the resignation of Nationals-turned-independent member Rob Oakeshott, over the Nationals by a two-party margin of 54.5–45.5%, despite a swing of 23.7 points to the Nationals. On 19 June 2010 a by-election in the electoral district of Penrith was triggered as a result of the resignation of Labor Party MP Karyn Paluzzano, with Liberal candidate Stuart Ayres winning the seat with a two-party-preferred swing of more than 25 points, the biggest swing against an incumbent government in New South Wales history, until the 2013 Miranda by-election which eclipsed it with a 26-point two-party swing against the Liberal/National government.

=== Key dates ===
- Expiry of 54th Parliament: 12am on Friday, 4 March 2011
- Issue of Writs: 5 March 2011
- Close of Nominations: 10 March 2011
- Polling Day: Saturday 26 March 2011
- Return of the Writs: 30 April 2011
- Meeting of 55th Parliament: By Monday, 16 May 2011

=== Campaign ===
The Labor Party launched their campaign on 5 February 2011 in Liverpool within the electoral district of Macquarie Fields. Premier Keneally launched the Labor Party's campaign slogan "Protecting jobs – Supporting families". In attendance for the launch were former Prime Minister Bob Hawke and former Premiers Wran and Carr.

The Liberal and Nationals Coalition launched their campaign on 20 February 2011 at the Joan Sutherland Performing Arts Centre in Penrith within the electoral district of Penrith with the slogan: "Real Change for NSW". In attendance for the launch were both Liberal and Nationals Leaders O'Farrell and Stoner as well as federal Liberal Party leader Tony Abbott, former Liberal Premiers and Leaders Greiner, Fahey, and Chikarovski.

The Coalition had been leading in opinion polling for almost three years, and were unbackable favourites throughout the campaign to win the election. The final Newspoll had support for Labor at an all-time low with 23 percent of the primary vote and 35.9 percent of the two-party vote. Bookmakers were paying $1.01 for a Coalition win with Labor getting as much as $36 and one agency even paid out the winnings and declared the winner a week earlier. At one point, Labor was widely predicted to win as few as 13 seats, seven less than the actual result. According to several pollsters, Labor was in danger of losing several seats where it had not been seriously threatened in decades, as well as several that it had held for a century or more. Indeed, there were concerns that Labor would not win enough seats to form a credible shadow cabinet.

=== Resulting parliament ===
The Liberal/National Coalition won the largest proportional number of seats in NSW state history with 69 of 93 seats in the lower house (74.2 percent of the chamber)—in contrast, Labor won 69 of 99 seats (69.7 percent of the chamber) at Neville Wran's second "Wranslide" in 1981 election. Labor won 20 seats, the party's smallest presence in Parliament in over a century, and the worst defeat that a sitting government in NSW has ever suffered. Many prominent Labor MPs and ministers lost their seats including Verity Firth, David Borger, Matt Brown, Jodi McKay, Virginia Judge, Phil Costa and Kevin Greene. In the process, the Coalition took dozens of seats in areas considered Labor heartland, such as western Sydney and the Upper Hunter—some on swings of well over 10 per cent. The Liberals actually won 51 seats, enough for a majority in their own right—the first time the main non-Labor party in the state had achieved this since adopting the Liberal banner in 1945. Although O'Farrell thus had no need for the support of the Nationals, he opted to retain the Coalition.

In the upper house however, where half of the chamber was up for election, the landslide was not enough to deliver a Coalition majority. Three additional votes outside of the Liberal/National Coalition were required to pass legislation. The balance of power shifted from the Greens to the Shooters and Fishers Party and Christian Democratic Party. With two seats each held by the latter two parties, both needed to give legislative support if Labor and the Greens opposed legislation.

== Retiring members ==
Where a Member of the Legislative Assembly or Legislative Council did not renominate to contest the election, their term ended at the dissolution of the parliament. Members who confirmed their retirement were:

=== Legislative Assembly ===
==== Labor (22) ====
- Marie Andrews (Gosford)
- John Aquilina (Riverstone)
- Diane Beamer (Mulgoa)
- David Campbell (Keira)
- Barry Collier (Miranda)
- Angela D'Amore (Drummoyne)
- Tanya Gadiel (Parramatta)
- Paul Gibson (Blacktown)
- Kerry Hickey (Cessnock)
- Phil Koperberg (Blue Mountains)
- Grant McBride (The Entrance)
- Gerard Martin (Bathurst)
- Lylea McMahon (Shellharbour)
- Alison Megarrity (Menai)
- Frank Sartor (Rockdale)
- Tony Stewart (Bankstown)
- Joe Tripodi (Fairfield)
- Graham West (Campbelltown)

==== Liberal (5) ====
- Peter Debnam (Vaucluse)
- Judy Hopwood (Hornsby)
- Malcolm Kerr (Cronulla)
- Wayne Merton (Baulkham Hills)
- Michael Richardson (Castle Hill)

==== Nationals (2) ====
- John Turner (Myall Lakes)
- Russell Turner (Orange)

=== Legislative Council ===
==== Labor (4) ====
- Tony Catanzariti
- Kayee Griffin
- Christine Robertson
- Ian West

==== Greens (1) ====
- Ian Cohen

== Opinion polling ==
Opinion polling was conducted by firms such as Newspoll, Galaxy and Nielsen via random telephone number selection in city and country areas Sampling sizes consist of around 1200–1300 electors. The declared margin of error is ±3 percentage points.

=== Graphical summary ===
==== Primary votes ====
Graphical summary of primary voting opinion polling for the 2011 New South Wales state election (legislative assembly).

==== Two-party preferred ====
Graphical summary of two-party-preferred opinion polling for the 2011 New South Wales state election (legislative assembly).

==== Voting intention ====
Legislative Assembly polling
Date	Firm	Primary vote				TPP vote
Date	Firm	ALP	L/NP	GRN	OTH	ALP	L/NP
26 March 2011	Nielsen	22%	50%	13%	15%	36%	64%
21–24 March 2011	Newspoll	23%	49%	12%	15%	35.9%	64.1%
23 March 2011	Galaxy	22%	51%	12%	15%	34%	64%
23 March 2011	Essential	23%	55%	11%	11%	34%	66%
18 March 2011	Essential	24%	54%	12%	11%	35%	65%
9–11 March 2011	Newspoll	26%	50%	11%	13%	37%	63%
4 March 2011	Galaxy	23%	50%	14%	13%	36%	64%
18 February 2011	Essential	27%	51%	12%	10%	41%	59%
Jan-Feb 2011	Newspoll	23%	46%	17%	14%	38%	62%
16 February 2011	Nielsen	22%	53%	13%	12%	34%	66%
20 January 2011	Nielsen	20%	51%	15%	14%	34%	66%
Nov-Dec 2010	Newspoll	23%	46%	17%	14%	37%	63%
Oct-Dec 2010	Morgan	22%	53%	13.5%	11.5%	35%	65%
Sep-Oct 2010	Newspoll	23%	46%	17%	14%	37%	63%
Jul-Aug 2010	Newspoll	25%	46%	14%	15%	39%	61%
May-Jun 2010	Newspoll	25%	46%	16%	12%	39%	61%
Mar-Apr 2010	Newspoll	31%	42%	14%	13%	45%	55%
22 March 2010	Galaxy	29%	44%	14%	13%	43%	57%
14 January 2010	Galaxy	29%	43%	15%	13%	44%	56%
4 December 2009 Kristina Keneally replaces Nathan Rees as Labor leader and Premier
Nov-Dec 2009	Newspoll	26%	44%	17%	13%	41%	59%
28 November 2009	Taverner	31%	43%	—N/a	26%	45%	55%
Sep-Oct 2009	Newspoll	30%	42%	12%	16%	45%	55%
Jul-Aug 2009	Newspoll	32%	41%	14%	13%	46%	54%
May-Jun 2009	Newspoll	31%	41%	14%	14%	45%	55%
31 May 2009	Taverner	—N/a	—N/a	—N/a	—N/a	44%	56%
Mar-Apr 2009	Newspoll	33%	40%	13%	14%	47%	53%
Jan-Feb 2009	Newspoll	30%	42%	15%	13%	44%	56%
Nov-Dec 2008	Newspoll	26%	43%	14%	17%	41%	59%
Sep-Oct 2008	Newspoll	29%	42%	11%	18%	44%	56%
5 September Nathan Rees replaces Morris Iemma as Labor leader and Premier
Jul-Aug 2008	Newspoll	33%	40%	13%	14%	48%	52%
29 June 2008	Taverner	28%	46%	—N/a	26%	44%	56%
May-Jun 2008	Newspoll	32%	41%	13%	14%	48%	52%
Mar-Apr 2008	Newspoll	35%	38%	14%	13%	51%	49%
Jan-Mar 2008	Newspoll	34%	39%	14%	13%	50%	50%
15–19 February 2008	Nielsen	38%	42%	11%	9%	50%	50%
2 February 2008	Taverner	—N/a	—N/a	—N/a	—N/a	51%	49%
4 April 2007 Barry O'Farrell succeeds Peter Debnam as Liberal leader and Leader of the Opposition
24 March 2007 election		38.98%	36.99%	8.95%	15.08%	52.26%	47.74%
23 March 2007	Nielsen	41%	36%	10%	13%	56%	44%

=== Better Premier and satisfaction ===
==== Graphical summary ====
View source data.
View source data.
View source data.

Better Premier and satisfaction polling*
Date	Firm	Better Premier		Keneally		O'Farrell
Date	Firm	Keneally	O'Farrell	Satisfied	Dissatisfied	Satisfied	Dissatisfied
26 March 2011	Nielsen	37%	53%	37%	54%	53%	34%
21-24 March 2011	Newspoll	32%	48%	33%	59%	48%	39%
23 March 2011	Galaxy	33%	53%	—N/a	—N/a	—N/a	—N/a
4 March 2011	Galaxy	34%	50%	—N/a	—N/a	—N/a	—N/a
Jan-Feb 2011	Newspoll	32%	47%	30%	57%	43%	35%
16 February 2011	Nielsen	38%	52%	36%	58%	55%	33%
14 January 2011	Galaxy	32%	54%	30%	62%	53%	33%
Nov-Dec 2010	Newspoll	35%	40%	35%	49%	42%	33%
Sep-Oct 2010	Newspoll	35%	42%	39%	50%	48%	32%
Jul-Aug 2010	Newspoll	39%	39%	39%	44%	43%	33%
May-Jun 2010	Newspoll	44%	36%	47%	37%	44%	33%
Mar-Apr 2010	Newspoll	45%	30%	47%	31%	41%	34%
22 March 2010	Galaxy	48%	35%	53%	30%	44%	36%
Jan-Feb 2010	Newspoll	40%	31%	41%	26%	44%	30%
14 January 2010	Galaxy	42%	34%	45%	25%	42%	35%
Nov-Dec 2009	Newspoll	35%	34%	—N/a	—N/a	44%	30%
4 December 2009 Keneally replaces Rees		Rees	O'Farrell	Rees		O'Farrell
28 November 2009	Nielsen	43%	40%	39%	49%	44%	36%
Jul-Aug 2009	Newspoll	32%	33%	33%	51%	36%	36%
May-Jun 2009	Newspoll	33%	32%	30%	49%	34%	34%
31 May 2009	Taverner	33%	50%	—N/a	—N/a	—N/a	—N/a
Mar-Apr 2009	Newspoll	33%	31%	34%	46%	35%	37%
Jan-Feb 2009	Newspoll	34%	29%	37%	42%	39%	32%
Nov-Dec 2008	Newspoll	30%	33%	34%	47%	40%	32%
Sep-Oct 2008	Newspoll	35%	28%	39%	26%	41%	30%
5 September 2008 Rees replaces Iemma		Iemma	O'Farrell	Iemma		O'Farrell
May-Jun 2008	Newspoll	32%	39%	26%	63%	37%	34%
Mar-Apr 2008	Newspoll	36%	33%	28%	56%	33%	34%
19 February 2008	Nielsen	45%	30%	34%	44%	not asked
17 February 2008	Taverner	—N/a	—N/a	51%	29%	18%	19%
4 April 2007 O'Farrell replaces Debnam		Iemma	Debnam	Iemma		Debnam
24 March 2007 election		–	–	–	–	–	–
22 March 2007	Newspoll	58%	24%	47%	43%	31%	55%
*Remainder were "uncommitted", "fair" or "other/neither".

== Newspaper endorsements ==
Newspaper	Endorsement
The Australian	Liberal
The Australian Financial Review	Liberal
Newcastle Herald	Liberal
The Daily Telegraph	Liberal
The Sydney Morning Herald	Liberal

== Results ==
=== Legislative Assembly ===
Legislative Assembly (IRV) – (CV)
Party	Votes	%	Swing	Seats	Change
Liberal	1,602,457	38.58	▲+11.64	51	▲27
National	521,864	12.56	▲+2.51	18	▲5
Coalition total	2,124,321	51.15	▲+14.16	69	▲32
Labor	1,061,352	25.55	▼–13.43	20	▼30
Greens	427,144	10.28	▲+1.33	1	▲1
Christian Democrats	129,431	3.12	▲+0.65	0	Steady
Hatton's Independent Team	45,969	1.10	New	0	Steady
Family First	18,576	0.45	New	0	Steady
Socialist Alliance	3,180	0.07	New	0	Steady
Social Justice Network	3,173	0.07	New	0	Steady
Independent Australia First	2,446	0.06	New	0	Steady
Socialist Equality	2,056	0.05	New	0	Steady
Democratic Labor	1,855	0.04	New	0	Steady
United We Stand	1,414	0.03	New	0	Steady
Progressive Labour	1,372	0.03	New	0	Steady
Communist League	1,226	0.03	New	0	Steady
Sex Party	676	0.02	New	0	Steady
Democrats	617	0.01	▼–0.39	0	Steady
Independent Protectionist	289	0.01	New	0	Steady
Independents	314,066	7.56	▼–1.62	3	▼3
Formal votes	4,153,335	96.72	▲+0.18	–	–
Informal votes	137,260	3.20	▲+0.43	–	–
Total	4,290,595	–	–	93	–
Registered voters / turnout	4,635,810	92.55	▼–0.09	–	–
Two-party-preferred vote
Coalition	2,324,226	64.22	▲+16.48		
Labor	1,294,824	35.78	▼–16.48		

Popular vote
Liberal	38.58%
Labor	25.55%
National	12.56%
Greens	10.28%
Independent	8.85%
Christian Democrats	3.12%
Family First	0.45%
Others	0.60%
Two-party-preferred vote
Coalition	64.22%
Labor	35.78%
Parliamentary seats
Liberal	51
Labor	20
National	18
Independent	3
Greens	1

=== Legislative Council ===
Legislative Council election, 2011
Party	Votes	%	+/–	Seats			
Party	Votes	%	+/–	2011 Seats	2007 Seats	Total Seats	+/-
Liberal/National Coalition	1,943,246	47.68	+13.50	11	8	19	+4
Labor	967,242	23.73	-15.40	5	9	14	-5
Greens	453,125	11.12	+2.00	3	2	5	+1
Shooters and Fishers	150,741	3.70	+0.90	1	1	2	0
Christian Democrats	127,233	3.12	-1.30	1	1	2	0
Other	434,437	10.66	+0.30	0	0	0	0
Total	4,076,024	100.00	–	21	21	42	0

=== Seats changing hands ===
Seat	Pre-2011			Swing	Post-2011		
Seat	Party	Member	Margin	Swing	Margin	Member	Party
Balmain	Labor	Verity Firth	3.7	–7.2	3.5*	Jamie Parker	Greens
Bathurst	Labor	Gerard Martin	13.0	–36.7	23.7	Paul Toole	National
Blue Mountains	Labor	Phil Koperberg	11.1	–15.8	4.7	Roza Sage	Liberal
Camden	Labor	Geoff Corrigan	3.9	–22.8	18.9	Chris Patterson	Liberal
Campbelltown	Labor	Graham West	18.5	–21.9	3.4	Bryan Doyle	Liberal
Charlestown	Labor	Matthew Morris	14.6	–24.5	9.9	Andrew Cornwell	Liberal
Coogee	Labor	Paul Pearce	7.2	–15.4	8.2	Bruce Notley-Smith	Liberal
Dubbo	Independent	Dawn Fardell	0.9	–14.6	13.7	Troy Grant	National
Drummoyne	Labor	Angela D'Amore	7.6	–24.3	16.7	John Sidoti	Liberal
East Hills	Labor	Alan Ashton	14.1	–14.7	0.6	Glenn Brookes	Liberal
Gosford	Labor	Marie Andrews	4.9	–16.7	11.9	Chris Holstein	Liberal
Granville	Labor	David Borger	11.1	–13.7	2.6	Tony Issa	Liberal
Heathcote	Labor	Paul McLeay	8.8	–21.4	12.7	Lee Evans	Liberal
Kiama	Labor	Matt Brown	12.0	–19.5	7.5	Gareth Ward	Liberal
Londonderry	Labor	Allan Shearan	6.9	–19.2	12.3	Bart Bassett	Liberal
Maitland	Labor	Frank Terenzini	9.7	–16.0	6.3	Robyn Parker	Liberal
Menai	Labor	Alison Megarrity	2.7	–27.1	24.4	Melanie Gibbons	Liberal
Miranda	Labor	Barry Collier	0.8	–21.8	21.0	Graham Annesley	Liberal
Monaro	Labor	Steve Whan	6.3	–8.3	2.0	John Barilaro	National
Mulgoa	Labor	Diane Beamer	11.1	–23.2	12.0	Tanya Davies	Liberal
Newcastle	Labor	Jodi McKay	1.2	–3.6	2.4	Tim Owen	Liberal
Oatley	Labor	Kevin Greene	14.4	–14.9	0.5	Mark Coure	Liberal
Parramatta	Labor	Tanya Gadiel	13.7	–25.8	12.1	Geoff Lee	Liberal
Port Macquarie	Independent	Peter Besseling	28.2**	–35.1	6.9	Leslie Williams	National
Riverstone	Labor	John Aquilina	10.1	–30.3	20.2	Kevin Conolly	Liberal
Rockdale	Labor	Frank Sartor	10.3	–13.9	3.6	John Flowers	Liberal
Smithfield	Labor	Ninos Khoshaba	15.5	–20.3	4.8	Andrew Rohan	Liberal
Strathfield	Labor	Virginia Judge	15.1	–19.3	4.3	Charles Casuscelli	Liberal
Swansea	Labor	Robert Coombs	10.8	–11.9	1.1	Garry Edwards	Liberal
Tamworth	Independent	Peter Draper	4.8	–12.5	7.8	Kevin Anderson	National
The Entrance	Labor	Grant McBride	4.9	–17.3	12.5	Chris Spence	Liberal
Wollondilly	Labor	Phil Costa	3.3	–18.0	14.7	Jai Rowell	Liberal
Wyong	Labor	David Harris	6.9	–9.4	2.5	Darren Webber	Liberal

- *Figure is Greens v Liberal
- **Figure is from the 2007 state election, where Rob Oakeshott was the independent candidate.
- In addition, the Liberals won Ryde and Penrith, which were gained from Labor at by-elections.
- Members listed in italics did not contest their seat at this election.

Every seat in New South Wales swung to the Coalition on a two-party-preferred basis. The Coalition won the largest government in New South Wales history in a huge landslide, while Labor suffered the largest swing against a sitting government anywhere in Australia (and on any level) since World War II, as well as one of the worst defeats of a state government since Federation. This led to 12 consecutive years of Coalition government in New South Wales (the longest Coalition government and the third-longest state government overall in New South Wales history), until the Coalition was narrowly defeated in 2023.

The Liberals alone won more first preference votes than Labor (usually it takes both Coalition parties, the Liberals and the Nationals, to have a higher first preference vote than Labor).

Labor only had two safe seats after the defeat, both of which were in Western Sydney. The seats were Bankstown (on a 10.3% margin) and Liverpool (on a 14.7% margin). Labor only held five seats outside of Sydney (Cessnock, Keira, Shellharbour, Wallsend and Wollongong).

Ultimately, the Liberals won 27 seats from Labor (Blue Mountains, Camden, Campbelltown, Charlestown, Coogee, Drummoyne, East Hills, Gosford, Granville, Heathcote, Kiama, Londonderry, Maitland, Menai, Miranda, Mulgoa, Newcastle, Oatley, Parramatta, Riverstone, Rockdale, Smithdale, Strathfield, Swansea, The Entrance, Wollondilly and Wyong) while the Nationals won two seats from Labor (Bathurst and Monaro). The Nationals gained three seats from independents (Dubbo, Port Macquarie and Tamworth), which were Nationals seats held by personally popular independents. It is likely that Port Macquarie and Tamworth were regained by the Nationals easily due to a move by two independents in the federal seats of Lyne (Rob Oakeshott) and New England (Tony Windsor), which partially overlap with the respective state seats, to support Julia Gillard, who formed a Labor minority government, over the Coalition under Tony Abbott. (although Oakeshott stated that he would have supported the Coalition if Malcolm Turnbull was their leader instead of Abbott). Oakeshott and Windsor were personally popular in these seats (with Oakeshott even being an ex-National). However, this decision angered the locals in seats that were still safely National on traditional two-party-preferred contests with Labor. The member for Port Macquarie, Peter Besseling, was friends with Oakeshott and previously worked as his advisor. Independents held just three seats after the election: Lake Macquarie, Northern Tablelands and Sydney.

The Greens won their first ever seat in New South Wales, the formerly-safe Labor seat of Balmain in inner-city Sydney, despite the Liberals winning the first preference vote.

== See also ==
- Government of New South Wales
- O'Farrell ministry
- First Baird ministry
- Shadow Ministry of John Robertson
- Post-election pendulum for the 2007 New South Wales state election
- Members of the New South Wales Legislative Assembly, 2011–2015
- Members of the New South Wales Legislative Council, 2011–2015
