= Anna Watson (politician) =

Australian politician

Anna Watson MP
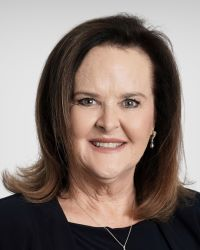

Parliamentary Secretary for Roads and for Regional Transport and Roads
- Incumbent
- Assumed office 1 May 2023
- Minister: John Graham (Roads); Jenny Aitchison (Regional Transport and Roads)
- Preceded by: Mark Taylor (as Parliamentary Secretary for Infrastructure and Cities, Transport and Roads); Stephen Bromhead (as Parliamentary Secretary for Regional Transport and Roads)

Opposition Whip
- In office 2 July 2019 – 25 March 2023
- Deputy: David Mehan
- Preceded by: Nick Lalich
- Succeeded by: Adam Crouch

Member of the New South Wales Parliament for Shellharbour
- Incumbent
- Assumed office 26 March 2011
- Preceded by: Lylea McMahon

Personal details
- Born: Anna Harwood
- Party: Labor Party
- Occupation: Trade union organiser

Anna Watson is an Australian politician and a member of the New South Wales Legislative Assembly representing the electoral district of Shellharbour.

== Personal life ==
Watson grew up in Loftus. She was employed in accounting and clerical jobs before becoming a union organiser with the United Services Union. In the 12 years she spent in that role, Watson was involved in union activities in a number of industries.

== Preselection ==
Watson was preselected in 2010 following the resignation of former member Lylea McMahon. McMahon had been "parachuted" into the seat prior to the 2007 State election by "Sussex Street" – Labor Party headquarters in Sydney. A number of factional opponents claimed she had been personally selected by former premier, Morris Iemma. Her appointment was strongly opposed by local Australian Workers' Union official Andy Gillespie – the two had previously been in conflict over a dispute at the nearby BlueScope facility at Port Kembla. In the years between the 2007 and 2011 elections, Gillespie lobbied the Labor Party to give local branch members the chance to select a local candidate. Labor Party officials capitulated and McMahon realised she could not win the preselection vote. She resigned the night before the preselection committee was due to meet. Watson won the subsequent preselection vote.

== Election ==
During the 2011 election campaign, anonymous brochures were distributed throughout the electorate claiming Watson was not fit to hold office. The material claimed of Watson that a, "recent background of infidelity, deception, lies and immoral conduct precedes this person" – claims Watson denied "unreservedly". Watson later said she believed she knew who had published the brochures and that neither the Liberal Party or a factional Labor opponent had been responsible for the material.

Watson was elected at the 2011 state election, despite a general swing against the Labor Party.

== Other ==
In 2020, Watson deleted her Twitter account after apologising to Joe Hildebrand for her comments to him after he criticised Victorian Premier Daniel Andrews' COVID-19 response.

New South Wales Legislative Assembly
Preceded by Lylea McMahon	Member for Shellharbour; 2011–present	Incumbent
