= Robert Dwyer (politician) =

Australian politician

Robert Dwyer MP

Member of the New South Wales Legislative Assembly for Port Macquarie
- Incumbent
- Assumed office 15 March 2025
- Preceded by: Leslie Williams
- Majority: 3.5% (2025)

Personal details
- Party: Liberal
- Children: 3
- Website: NSW Liberal profile

Robert Daniel Dwyer is an Australian politician and former licensed club manager. He was elected to represent the electoral district of Port Macquarie in the parliament of New South Wales following the 2025 Port Macquarie by-election. He is a member of the Liberal Party of Australia.

== Political career ==
Dwyer won pre-selection to be the Liberals candidate for Port Macquarie following the retirement of the previous member, Leslie Williams. He beat one other candidate for party selection and went on to defeat the Nationals candidate by leading the primary vote and winning the two-candidate-preferred vote by 53.5% to 46.5%.

Dwyer is the third Liberal (after Williams and Les Jordan) to represent the Port Macquarie-Hastings region of the Mid North Coast in the New South Wales Legislative Assembly.

== Personal life ==
Dwyer is married with three children and lives in Camden Haven. Prior to entering politics, he was the General manager of Laurieton United Services Club and Kew Country Club. He has been a patron of charities, including chairing the Slice of Haven Festival. He holds a Bachelor of Business.

New South Wales Legislative Assembly
Preceded by Leslie Williams	Member for Port Macquarie; 2025–present	Incumbent
