= 2008 Port Macquarie state by-election =

By-election in New South Wales, Australia

- 18 October 2008
	First party	Second party
	IND
Candidate	Peter Besseling	Leslie Williams
Party	Independent	National
Popular vote	15,003	14,061
Percentage	35.94%	33.69%
Swing	▲35.94	▲14.24
TPP	54.52%	45.48%
TPP swing	▲54.52	▲23.70
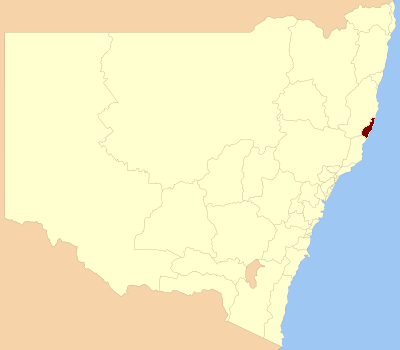
- Location in New South Wales
MP before election
Rob Oakeshott
Independent
Elected MP
Peter Besseling
Independent

A by-election was held for the New South Wales Legislative Assembly seat of Port Macquarie on 18 October 2008. This was triggered by the resignation of independent MP Rob Oakeshott who was elected to the federal seat of Lyne at a by-election the previous month.

The writ for the Port Macquarie by-election was issued on 29 August, which was also when the rolls closed. Candidate nominations closed on 18 September. The by-election was contested on the same boundaries drawn for Port Macquarie at the 2007 state election. At that election, the independent MP won the seat over the Nationals by a two-party preferred margin of 78.2% to 21.8%.

== Background ==
Created in a 1988 redistribution, Port Macquarie has always been based on Port Macquarie and Laurieton–Camden Haven. It was a safe National Party seat prior to the election of Oakeshott, who was MP for Port Macquarie since 1996, becoming an independent in 2002.

== Candidates ==
The following candidates nominated for the election:

- Independent – James Langley, contested federal Lyne for Labor in 2007. Quit the party over protest at the Iemma state Labor electricity privatisation.
- Christian Democratic Party – Bob Waldron
- Independent – Lisa Intemann (former Port Macquarie-Hastings councillor)
- Greens – Susie Russell
- National Party – Leslie Williams, Lake Cathie resident, contested Port Macquarie for the Nationals in 2007. Ms Williams is a nurse at Port Macquarie Base Hospital and current chairman of the party's Port Macquarie Electorate Council.
- Independent – Tony Galati
- Independent – Grant Rogers
- Independent – Bob Sharpham
- Independent – Peter Besseling
- Independent – Jamie Harrison (former Port Macquarie-Hastings councillor)
- Independent – Cameron Price

== Campaign ==
Federal Hume MP Alby Schultz was seen campaigning a few times for Besseling, referring to him as "the pick of the candidates", with similar support from Senator Bill Heffernan, sparking anger and resentment within the coalition.

== Results ==
Despite independent Rob Oakeshott moving into federal politics, another independent, Peter Besseling, retained the seat, winning on the primary and two party vote.

2008 Port Macquarie by-election Saturday 18 October
Party	Candidate	Votes	%	±%
Independent	Peter Besseling	15,003	35.94	+35.94
National	Leslie Williams	14,061	33.69	+14.24
Independent	Jamie Harrison	3,484	8.35	+8.35
Independent	Lisa Intemann	3,134	7.51	+7.51
Independent	James Langley	2,045	4.90	+4.90
Greens	Susie Russell	1,971	4.72	+1.97
Independent	Bob Sharpham	795	1.90	+1.90
Christian Democrats	Bob Waldron	514	1.23	+1.23
Independent	Tony Galati	417	1.00	+1.00
Independent	Grant Rogers	196	0.47	+0.47
Independent	Cameron Price	129	0.31	+0.31
Total formal votes		41,749	98.20	−0.54
Informal votes		765	1.26	+0.54
Turnout		42,514	88.21	−5.27
Two-candidate-preferred result
Independent	Peter Besseling	20,068	54.52	+54.52
National	Leslie Williams	16,741	45.48	+23.70
Independent hold		Swing	N/A	

== See also ==
- Electoral results for the district of Port Macquarie
- 2011 New South Wales state election
