= Wendy Machin =

Australian politician

Wendy Machin MP

Member of the New South Wales Parliament for Gloucester
- In office 12 October 1985 – 22 February 1988
- Preceded by: Leon Punch
- Succeeded by: Abolished

Member of the New South Wales Legislative Assembly for Manning
- In office 19 March 1988 – 3 May 1991
- Preceded by: Recreated
- Succeeded by: Abolished

Member of the New South Wales Legislative Assembly for Port Macquarie
- In office 25 May 1991 – 28 August 1996
- Preceded by: Bruce Jeffery
- Succeeded by: Rob Oakeshott

Personal details
- Born: 14 October 1958 (age 68) Wingham, New South Wales, Australia
- Party: The Nationals
- Education: New South Wales Institute of Technology
- Occupation: Consultant

Wendy Susan Machin (born 14 October 1958 in Wingham, New South Wales), is a former Australian politician. She was the first woman member of the Nationals elected to the New South Wales Parliament and was Minister for Consumer Affairs and Minister Assisting the Minister for Roads and Assisting the Minister for Transport between 1993–1995. She was later president of the National Roads and Motorists' Association (NRMA) from 2008 to 2014.

== Early life ==
Machin studied at Wingham High School before earning a Bachelor of Arts (Communications) at the New South Wales Institute of Technology She also holds a Masters of Commerce from the University of New South Wales.

== Political career ==
Machin worked for the Young National Party as a field organiser, serving on its State Executive, and as Communications Officer for the National Party of Australia from 1981–82. In 1983 she was elected to North Sydney Municipal Council an independent alderman at age 25, serving until 1985 when she contested a by-election for the New South Wales Legislative Assembly seat of Gloucester on 12 October.

Winning the safe National Party seat, she became the first woman to represent the National Party in the Legislative Assembly. She founded her company Machin Consulting in the same year.

Her original seat of Gloucester was abolished before the 1988 state election, so she stood for the newly recreated seat of Manning which covered the a portion of the same area. Manning was subsequently abolished after one term. The bulk of its territory was merged into Port Macquarie at the 1991 state election, and Machin successfully transferred there.

Machin was Deputy Speaker and became the first woman to chair the New South Wales Parliament. She appointed Minister for Consumer Affairs in the coalition government of John Fahey on 26 May 1993.

The election of the Carr Labor government in 1995 saw the coalition in opposition. Machin was appointed shadow minister for Consumer Affairs, Roads and Fisheries until she resigned from Parliament on 28 August 1996 after the birth of her second child. Her resignation prompted the 1996 Port Macquarie by election, won by then National Party member Rob Oakeshott.

== Post-parliamentary career ==
Machin became the President of Save the Children Fund NSW in 1996, remaining in that position until 2000, as well as serving on the National Council for the Prevention of Child Abuse and Neglect.

Between 1997 and 2000 Machin was the Deputy Chair of the Australian Republican Movement. She was a delegate to the Constitutional Convention in February 1998, elected by a voluntary ballot run by the Australian Electoral Commission

In 2005, Machin was elected to the board of the NRMA to represent the Coghlan region, which stretches from the Hunter River to the Queensland border. Following her re-election to the NRMA board on 8 December 2008, Machin became President on 10 December until November 2014.

== Private life ==
Wendy Machin has 3 children; James, Georgia and Emma. Her only sibling, Janne, was left profoundly disabled after a difficult birth.

New South Wales Legislative Assembly
Preceded by Leon Punch	Member for Gloucester; 1985-1988	Succeeded by Abolished
Preceded by Recreated	Member for Manning; 1988-1991	Succeeded by Abolished
Preceded by Bruce Jeffery	Member for Port Macquarie; 1991-1996	Succeeded by Rob Oakeshott
