= Leslie Williams (politician) =

Australian politician

The Honourable Leslie Williams

5th Deputy Speaker of the Legislative Assembly
- In office 7 May 2019 – 9 May 2023
- Speaker: Jonathan O'Dea
- Preceded by: Thomas George
- Succeeded by: Sonia Hornery

Assistant Minister for Education
- In office 2 April 2015 – 23 January 2017
- Minister: Adrian Piccoli
- Premier: Mike Baird
- Preceded by: Victor Dominello
- Succeeded by: Sarah Mitchell

Minister for Early Childhood Education
- In office 2 April 2015 – 23 January 2017
- Premier: Mike Baird
- Preceded by: New title
- Succeeded by: Sarah Mitchell

Minister for Aboriginal Affairs
- In office 2 April 2015 – 23 January 2017
- Premier: Mike Baird
- Preceded by: Victor Dominello
- Succeeded by: Sarah Mitchell

Member of the New South Wales Legislative Assembly for Port Macquarie
- In office 26 March 2011 – 31 January 2025
- Preceded by: Peter Besseling
- Succeeded by: Robert Dwyer

Personal details
- Born: Leslie Gladys Uren; 1960 or 1961 (age 65–66) Kangaroo Island, South Australia
- Party: Liberal
- Other political affiliations: The Nationals (Until 2020)
- Spouse: Don Williams (died 2022)
- Relations: Vickie Chapman (cousin); Ted Chapman (uncle)
- Occupation: Small business owner and nurse
- Website: www.lesliewilliams.com.au

Leslie Gladys Williams (born 1960 or 1961) is an Australian former politician who served as a member of the New South Wales Legislative Assembly, representing the seat of Port Macquarie from the 2011 state election until her resignation in 2025.

Williams was a member of the National Party until switching to the Liberal Party in 2020. She was the New South Wales Assistant Minister for Education, Minister for Aboriginal Affairs, and Minister for Early Childhood Education from 2 April 2015 until 23 January 2017 when she was replaced in Gladys Berejiklian's cabinet by Sarah Mitchell. From 7 May 2019 until 9 May 2023, she was the Deputy Speaker of the Legislative Assembly.

== Background ==
Leslie Gladys Williams was born on Kangaroo Island, South Australia. Williams' early career was in teaching in regional South Australia and she completed a short-term assignment as chief executive officer of the Northern Territory division of the Sudden Infant Death Association. In 2000, Williams and her husband commenced ownership of the post office at Lake Cathie, New South Wales, and now operate a mail delivery service. At the same time, she completed a degree in nursing, and worked in the medical and palliative care ward at the Port Macquarie Base Hospital.

Williams' community involvement includes membership of the Rotary Club of Laurieton, being a director of both the Hastings Men's Shed and the Suicide Prevention Network, and she is a volunteer for various organisations, including the Cancer Council of New South Wales and the Salvation Army.

== Political career ==
Williams' first tilt at public office was at the 2007 State Election where she was defeated by Nationals-turned-independent member, Rob Oakeshott. Williams gained a 3.4-point swing toward the Nationals. When Oakshott resigned the seat to contest a by-election in the Federal parliament, Williams again contested the seat against Oakshott's staffer and independent candidate, Peter Besseling. Besseling won the by-election despite a large 23.7-point swing toward Williams and the Nationals.

Williams again contested Port Macquarie at the next general election, the 2011 state election, and won against Besseling with a two-party-preferred swing of 10.9 points to the Nationals, giving Williams a 6.4-point margin against her independent opponent. She actually won enough votes on the first count to reclaim the seat for the Nationals without the need for preferences.

Her victory was put down in part to anger at Besseling's association with Oakeshott, who kept federal Labor in office as a minority government after the 2010 federal election. Port Macquarie has long been National heartland, and had been a comfortably safe National seat in "traditional" two-party matchups with Labor even when Oakeshott held it without serious difficulty as an independent.

Following the 2015 state election, Williams was sworn in as the Assistant Minister for Education, the Minister for Aboriginal Affairs, and the Minister for Early Childhood Education in the second Baird government.

On 20 September 2020 Williams announced she had resigned from the National Party and intended to defect to the Liberal Party, citing the "reckless and unreasonable behaviour" of the Nationals leader John Barilaro in threatening to move the party to the crossbench. She became a member of the Liberal Party later that night. Barilaro threatened to move to the crossbench over a dispute with the Liberal Party regarding a koala protection policy, though the matter was later resolved. Port Macquarie and its surrounds are known for having a large koala population, which is estimated to be around 2,000, and the region is home to the Hello Koalas sculpture trail and the Koala Hospital. Barilaro also announced that the National Party would field a candidate in the seat of Port Macquarie at the 2023 New South Wales state election. The Nationals selected local mayor Peta Pinson as their candidate, though Williams was easily re-elected. Following her re-election, Williams said the Nationals should have focused "more on seats like Monaro" than fielding a candidate in Port Macquarie.

On 2 June 2023, Williams was granted retention of The Honourable title by the Governor for life, for having served as Deputy Speaker for more than three years.

In January 2025, Williams announced her resignation.

== Personal life ==
Williams is the cousin of former South Australian Deputy Premier Vickie Chapman, and niece of Vickie's father Ted Chapman.

New South Wales Legislative Assembly
Preceded by Peter Besseling	Member for Port Macquarie; 2011–2025	Succeeded by Robert Dwyer
Preceded by Thomas George	Deputy Speaker; 2019–2023	Succeeded by Sonia Hornery
Political offices
Preceded by Victor Dominello	Assistant Minister for Education; 2015–2017	Succeeded by Sarah Mitchell
Preceded by Victor Dominello	Minister for Aboriginal Affairs; 2015–2017	Succeeded by Sarah Mitchell
New office	Minister for Early Childhood Education; 2015–2017	Succeeded by Sarah Mitchell
