= Lylea McMahon =

Australian politician

Member of New South Wales Legislative Assembly
- In office 24 March 2007 – 26 March 2011
- Preceded by: New seat
- Succeeded by: Anna Watson
- Constituency: Shellharbour

Personal details
- Born: 20 November 1971 (age 54)
- Party: Labor Party

Lylea Anne McMahon (born 20 November 1971), a former Australian politician, was a member of the New South Wales Legislative Assembly representing the electoral district of Shellharbour between 2007 and 2011. From 23 September 2008 until her resignation in 2011, McMahon also served as Parliamentary Secretary to the Minister for Energy and Mineral Resources.

McMahon studied at the University of Wollongong and obtained a Bachelor of Commerce in 1997 and a master's degree in 2005.

She was the senior industrial relations officer for BlueScope prior to her nomination as a candidate for the 2007 New South Wales election to replace the sitting Member for Illawarra Marianne Saliba after an electoral redistribution. She was supported in her preselection by Morris Iemma.

In addition to her duties as Parliamentary Secretary, McMahon was a member of the Standing Committee on Parliamentary Privilege and Ethics, a member of the Public Bodies Review Committee and a member of the Legislation Review Committee.

She is married and has three children.

On 11 December 2010, McMahon announced her decision to not recontest her seat at the 2011 state election, citing family reasons. However, later reports indicated she had been forced to resign after losing support from local unions.

New South Wales Legislative Assembly
New district	Member for Shellharbour; 2007 – 2011	Succeeded by Anna Watson
