= 2008 Lyne by-election =

- 6 September 2008
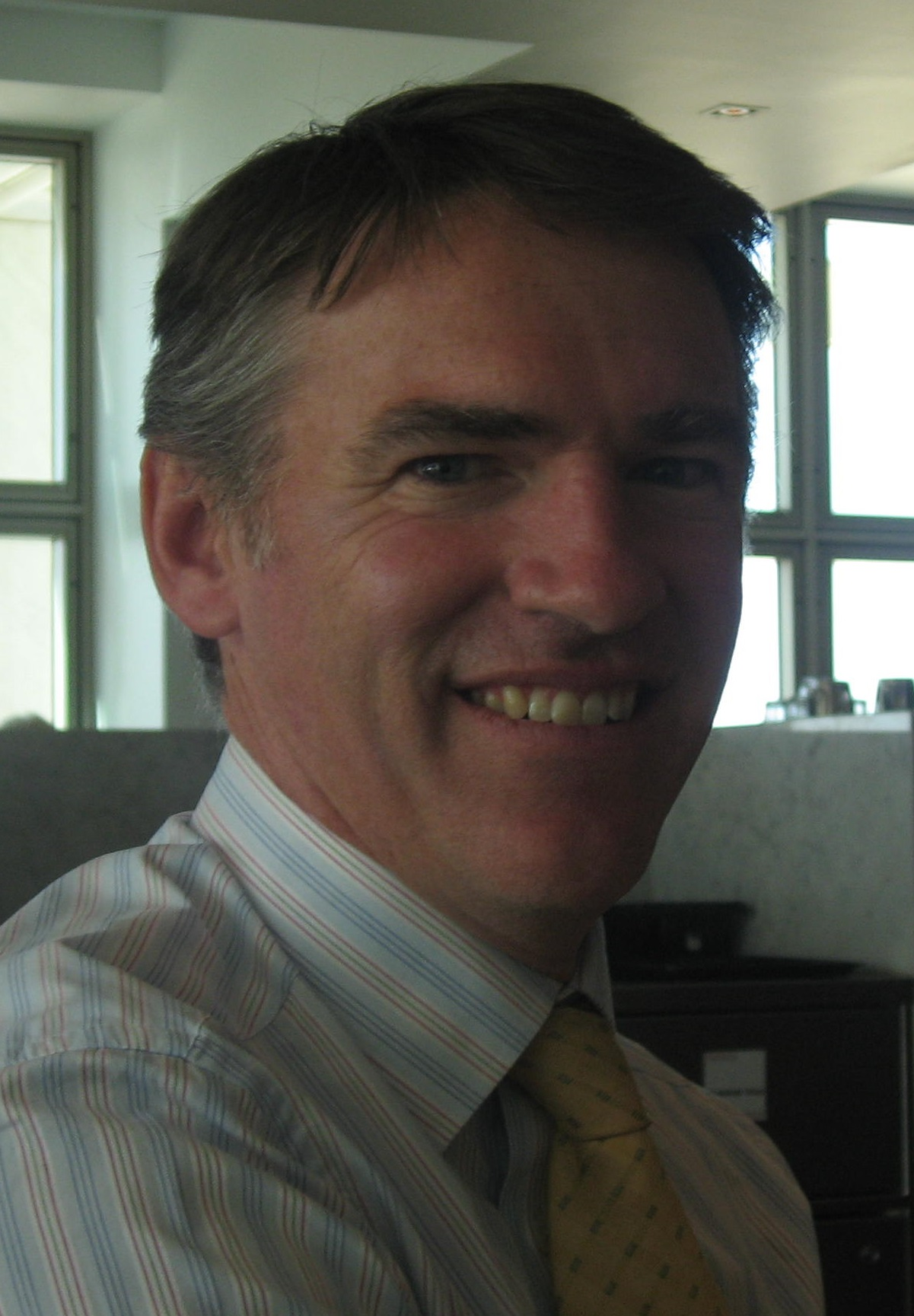

	First party	Second party
Candidate	Rob Oakeshott	Rob Drew
Party	Independent	National
Popular vote	47,306	16,964
Percentage	63.80%	22.88%
Swing	▲63.80	▼29.38
TPP	73.87%	26.13%
TPP swing	▲73.87	▼32.45
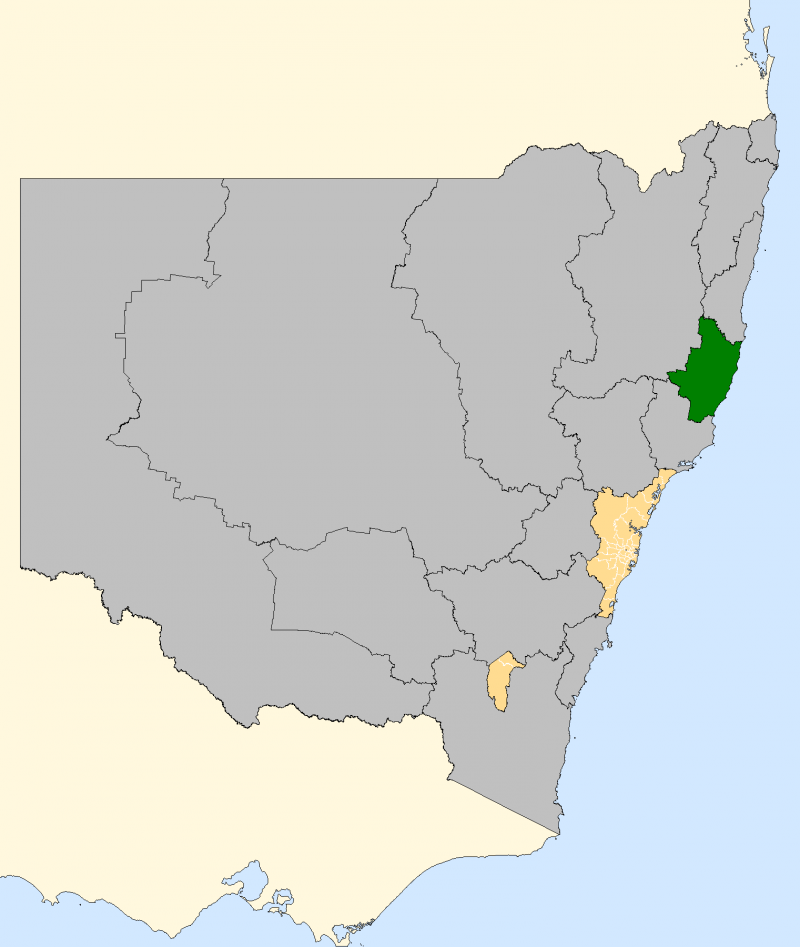
- Lyne (green) within New South Wales
MP before election
Mark Vaile
National
Elected MP
Rob Oakeshott
Independent

The 2008 Lyne by-election was held for the Australian House of Representatives seat of Lyne on 6 September 2008. This was triggered by the resignation of National Party MP Mark Vaile. The by-election was held on the same day as the Mayo by-election, and the Western Australian state election.

The writ for the by-election was issued on 4 August, with the rolls closing on 8 August. Candidate nominations closed 14 August. The by-election was contested on the same boundaries drawn for Lyne at the 2007 federal election. At that election, the National Party won the seat over the Labor Party by a two-party preferred margin of 58.58% to 41.42%.

The election was won by independent candidate Rob Oakeshott.

== Background ==
Vaile first won the seat of Lyne at the 1993 election for the Nationals in a very close contest with the Liberal candidate. In ministerial positions since 1997, he became leader of the National Party and thus Deputy Prime Minister in the Howard government from 2005. At the 2007 federal election, the opposition Labor Party defeated the incumbent Liberal-National coalition government. This marked the first change of government in over 11 years. Following the coalition election defeat, Vaile announced on 19 July 2008 his intention to resign his seat, to take effect on 30 July 2008. This followed Peter McGauran in Gippsland and former Foreign Minister Alexander Downer in Mayo.

== Candidates ==
Candidates (8) in ballot paper order
Party	Candidate	Background (Not shown on ballet paper)
Fishing Party	Bob Smith	Retired builder.
Citizens Electoral Council	Graeme Muldoon	Farmer, contested Lyne in 2007.
Independent	Stewart Scott-Irving	Education consultant, contested Lyne in 2007.
Democratic Labor Party	Michael Patrick O'Donohue	Teacher
Independent	Rob Oakeshott	Former state Nationals turned Independent MP for Port Macquarie since 1996. He polled more than two-thirds of the primary vote as an independent in his state seat at the last two elections, and his seat makes up more than half of Lyne. ABC political analyst Antony Green described Oakeshott as the "clear favourite", and "highly likely" to win the by-election. The Nationals admitted he posed a big threat. Upon announcing his candidacy, federal Nationals leader Warren Truss labelled Oakeshott a "Labor patsy". Oakeshott did not direct his preferences to any candidate. Attacks upon Oakeshott by the Nationals increased in the last week of campaigning.
Australian Greens	Susie Russel	Local environmentalist, contested Lyne in 2007.
National Party of Australia	Rob Drew	Former Port Macquarie mayor.
Independent	Barry Wright	Retired, contested Lyne in 2007.

Neither the Labor Party nor the Liberal Party stood a candidate.

== Results ==
Oakeshott obtained a majority of votes in every polling booth, with the exception of Dyers Crossing, receiving about two-thirds of the primary vote and three-quarters of the two-candidate vote.

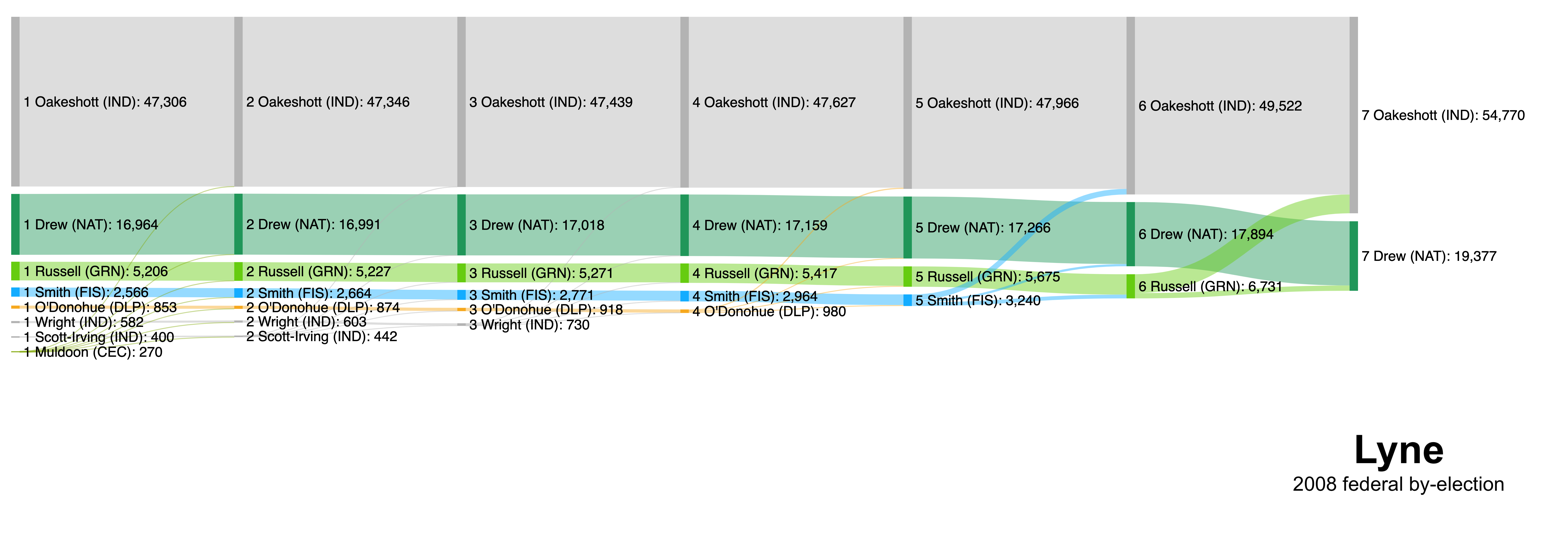
The distribution of preferences in the by-election resulted in the election of Rob Oakeshott.

2008 Lyne by-election
Party	Candidate	Votes	%	±%
Independent	Rob Oakeshott	47,306	63.80	+63.80
National	Rob Drew	16,964	22.88	−29.38
Greens	Susie Russell	5,206	7.02	−0.13
Fishing Party	Bob Smith	2,566	3.46	+3.46
Democratic Labor	Michael O'Donohue	853	1.15	+1.15
Independent	Barry Wright	582	0.78	−0.46
Independent	Stewart Scott-Irving	400	0.54	+0.12
Citizens Electoral Council	Graeme Muldoon	270	0.36	+0.13
Total formal votes		74,147	96.55	+1.62
Informal votes		2,646	3.45	−1.62
Turnout		76,793	87.31	−8.62
Two-candidate-preferred result
Independent	Rob Oakeshott	54,770	73.87	+73.87
National	Rob Drew	19,377	26.13	−32.45
Independent gain from National		Swing	N/A	

== See also ==
- List of Australian federal by-elections
