= Rob Oakeshott =

Australian politician

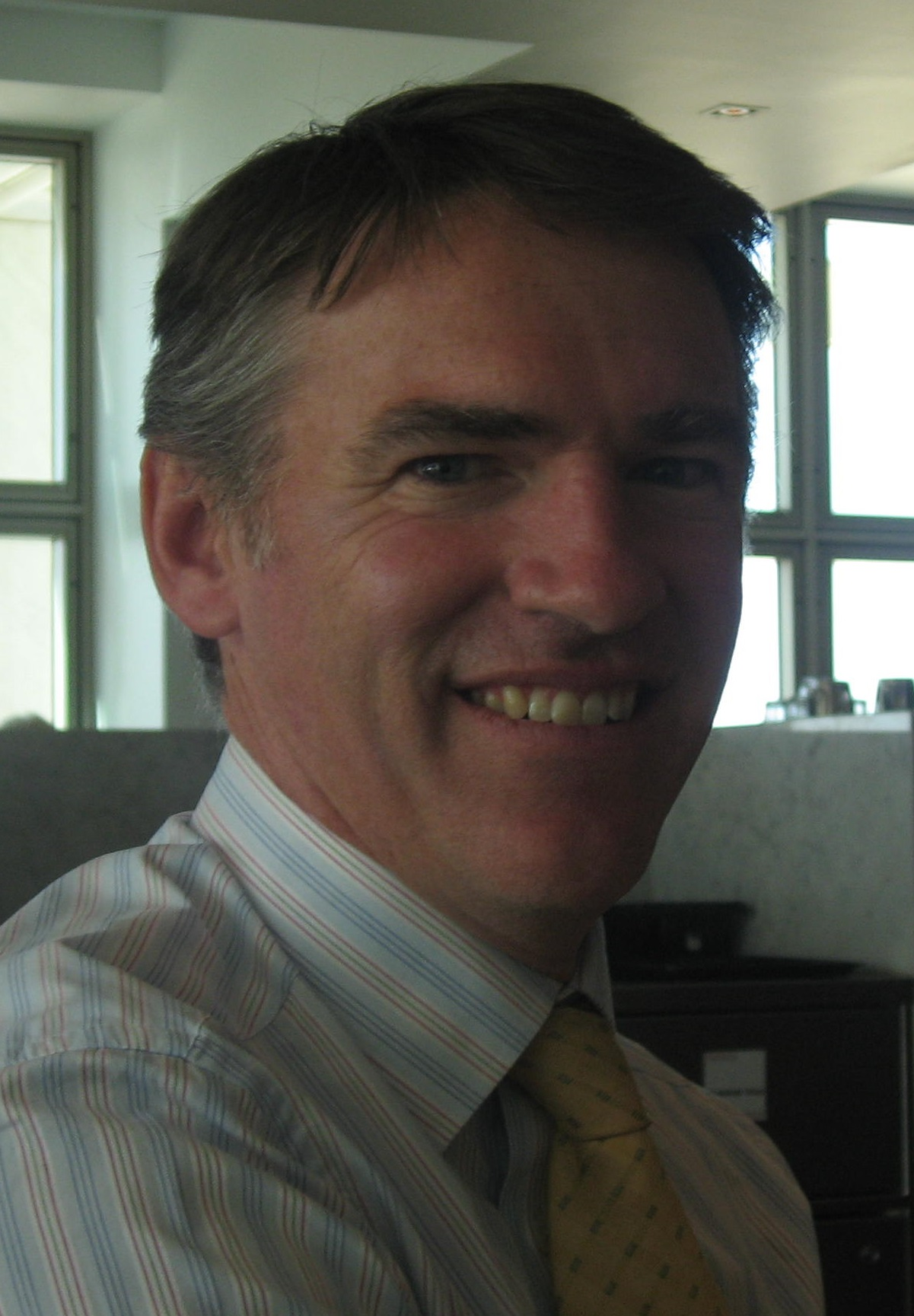

Member of the Australian Parliament for Lyne
- In office 6 September 2008 – 5 August 2013
- Preceded by: Mark Vaile
- Succeeded by: David Gillespie

Member of the New South Wales Parliament for Port Macquarie
- In office 30 November 1996 – 13 August 2008
- Preceded by: Wendy Machin
- Succeeded by: Peter Besseling

Personal details
- Born: Robert James Murray Oakeshott; 14 December 1969 (age 56) Lismore, New South Wales
- Party: National (1996–2002); Independent (2002–present)
- Education: University of Sydney; Macquarie University; University of Wollongong; University of New South Wales (BMed)
- Occupation: Political staffer

Robert James Murray Oakeshott (born 14 December 1969) is a retired Australian politician. He was the independent Member of the House of Representatives for the Division of Lyne in New South Wales from 2008, when he won the 2008 Lyne by-election, until his retirement in 2013. Oakeshott described his views as economically conservative and socially progressive.

Oakeshott began his political career in state politics. Originally elected as the National Party candidate for the state seat of Port Macquarie in the New South Wales Legislative Assembly in 1996, he left the party to become an independent in 2002. Oakeshott retained the seat until 2008, when he resigned to contest the federal seat of Lyne, which he won with a large margin. He retained Lyne at the 2010 election, again with a large margin.

The 2010 election resulted in a hung parliament, with the diverse crossbench holding the balance of power. Oakeshott, Tony Windsor and other crossbenchers agreed to back the incumbent Gillard Labor government to form minority government, providing it with confidence and supply, while retaining the right to vote on conscience in any other matters.

Oakeshott retired at the 2013 election, choosing not to recontest his seat. Oakeshott contested the Division of Cowper at the 2016 election, challenging National incumbent Luke Hartsuyker. Cowper had absorbed Port Macquarie after the latest redistribution. Oakeshott lost the election, but managed to turn the once-safe National seat into a marginal seat.

On 15 January 2019, Oakeshott announced his candidacy for the seat of Cowper at the 2019 Australian federal election. The Nationals retained the seat with a small swing towards them.

== Early life and career ==
Oakeshott was born in Lismore. His father, also named Rob Oakeshott, was a doctor in the area until his death in 2016 and his grandfather Captain John Oakeshott was a prisoner of war and survived the Sandakan Death Marches. His maternal grandfather was Sir Angus Murray, a President of the Australian Medical Association.

Oakeshott attended Barker College for his secondary schooling, and was a boarder in his later years there. He then studied a Bachelor of Arts at the University of Sydney. While there, he was a resident of St. Andrew's College when the Principal, Peter Cameron, was convicted of heresy by the Presbyterian Church of Australia. Oakeshott describes Cameron as an influence on his thinking:

As a student he was a pretty interesting fellow but standing on his digs over some of the speeches and some of the sermons he used to give. And in his parting speech to the students, he said, "I hope the great lesson I've taught you as the leader of this college is that you've got to stand up for what you believe in regardless of the consequences."

— Rob Oakeshott, Lateline, 23 August 2010

Oakeshott graduated with a Bachelor of Arts with Honours in Government in 1992. He then worked as an administrative officer at the Road Transport Forum, for the lobbying company Resolutions, as a staffer for future National Party Leader Mark Vaile, and in public relations for the Coalition in Canberra before his own election to the New South Wales Legislative Assembly.

== NSW parliament ==
He was elected as the National Party member for Port Macquarie at a by-election on 30 November 1996 after the retirement of National Party member Wendy Machin on 28 August, winning 46.71% of the primary vote against John Barrett, a former Liberal Party candidate who stood as an independent after the Liberals, then led by Peter Collins, decided not to run a candidate. However, the Nationals lost almost six percent of their primary vote from 1995, and their two-party majority fell to a marginal four percent. At his election, he was the youngest member of the NSW Legislative Assembly.

He stood again at the 1999 election, increasing his primary vote to 56.05% and his two-party vote to 66.6%, enough to revert Port Macquarie to its traditional status as a safe National seat. Under Opposition Leader Kerry Chikarovski, on 19 April 1999 he was appointed as the Shadow Minister for Sport and Recreation and the Shadow Minister for Fisheries and Ports. Following a Shadow Cabinet reshuffle on 1 February 2000, Oakeshott lost Fisheries and Ports and took on the shadow portfolio of Gaming and Racing. However, he had become increasingly dissatisfied with the National Party, stating that he was the youngest person at most meetings he attended, and found himself in opposition to many of the party's policies.

Almost immediately after his election to the legislature, Oakeshott identified a number of points of disagreement. He was not at home with the party's strong conservatism on social policy; he recalled being "massively heavied" not to support a Labor bill for a safe injecting room trial. He was also unnerved by a senior National claiming that "blacks and poofters (homosexuals)" were gaining too much influence in the party; he took particular offence to the former because his wife is of South Seas descent. He was also pressured to fall into line on the Nationals' staunch opposition to a republic.

He later said that he should have done "more due diligence" on the Nationals' ideology, saying that he would have never joined the party had he known about its conservative bent. He only did so because he was a budding political consultant and "they're the party around here, I'm a young bloke, I need a job." (Port Macquarie and its predecessor seat, Oxley, had been in the hands of a conservative party without interruption since 1927, and in the hands of the Nationals for all but six years since 1944.) He added that he didn't think the Nationals didn't do "enough due diligence on me" prior to clearing him to stand for Port Macquarie. He also questioned the relevance of the Nationals in an electorate transformed by demographic change and the growth of tourism. Increasingly, he concluded that as long as he remained in the National party room, he would be "a square peg in a round hole." He believed that he had three options–spend a decade in the legislature as a "robotron" National member, quit politics, or run as an independent.

Oakeshott resigned from both the shadow cabinet and the National Party on 9 March 2002. He subsequently retained the seat as an independent at the 2003 New South Wales State election, gaining 69.75% of the primary vote, compared to 14% for the National Party candidate. After preferences, he won 82 percent of the two-candidate vote, making Port Macquarie the safest seat in the legislature. He retained the seat almost as easily in 2007, winning 78 percent of the vote after preferences were distributed.

During his tenure as the state member for Port Macquarie Oakeshott completed a law degree at Macquarie University.

== Federal parliament ==
There were suggestions that Oakeshott would stand as an independent candidate at the 2004 federal election against his former boss and future National Party leader Mark Vaile in the seat of Lyne, based on Port Macquarie, but he did not nominate.

=== First term ===
In April 2008, following the defeat of the Howard government, Liberal Senator Bill Heffernan approached Oakeshott to consider standing as a joint Liberal-National candidate in Lyne should Vaile retire and a by-election be called. He did not comment at the time because Vaile had not announced his intentions. After Vaile announced his resignation from Parliament on 19 July 2008, Oakeshott announced that he would consider standing for the seat in the ensuing by-election.

On 5 August 2008 Oakeshott resigned from the NSW parliament to stand as an independent candidate at the federal by-election for Lyne. His advisor, Peter Besseling, won the by-election for his state seat.

Oakeshott won virtually every booth in the electorate, receiving about two-thirds of the primary vote. The extent of his primary vote saw him receive more than $100,000 in electoral reimbursements from the Australian Electoral Commission.

In his first term, Oakeshott voted 32 times with the ruling Labor government (including in support of the proposed emission trading scheme) and nine times with the opposition. He has explained that this record was not indicative of support for Labor's policy platform, but rather because he believed in allowing governments to govern.

=== Second term – support for minority government ===
Oakeshott was re-elected in the 2010 Australian federal election. With neither Labor nor the Liberal/National Coalition having enough members to form government on their own, he became one of a number of independents whose support was sought by both sides in a bid to form a minority government. Among the legislation that he supported was the proposed emissions trading scheme. Oakeshott decided with the other incumbent independents, Bob Katter and Tony Windsor, to negotiate as a bloc. While holding different opinions on the issue of climate change, all three have highlighted broadband as a policy important to them. Oakeshott expressed his desire to establish stable government and raised concerns that a 76-seat government was "a by-election away from trouble" and, to avoid this, he proposed the formation of a government with ministers from both of the usually antagonistic major parties. If no stable government capable of governing for the full three-year term could be formed, he recommended that the government should call a new election.

On 7 September 2010, Oakeshott gave his backing to the formation of a Labor minority government. He made the announcement at the end of a 17-minute speech. After announcing his decision, he stated that he had been offered a ministry by Julia Gillard and would be considering the offer. On 10 September 2010 he announced that he had turned down becoming the minister for Regional Australia, a portfolio created because of the agreement between himself, Tony Windsor and the ALP. Oakeshott later released a statement saying that he would accept nomination to be the Speaker of the Australian House of Representatives if he were nominated by another member, provided proposed Parliamentary reforms were put into place. In the event, he was not nominated, and Labor's Harry Jenkins was elected unopposed as speaker. Following Jenkins' resignation from the speakership in November 2011, Oakeshott was again offered the speakership, this time by opposition leader Tony Abbott, in a deal that would deliver government to the Liberal-National coalition. Oakeshott declined and Peter Slipper, a coalition MP, became speaker, allowing the Labor Party to continue in minority government.

Shortly before the Australian Labor Party leadership spill, 2012, Oakeshott stated that he would not, as a matter of course, continue to support the minority Labor government if Labor changed leaders. He further stated that he would be prepared to work with whoever could provide stable government and would consider negotiating with the Liberal-National coalition to that end, although his preference would be to deal with former opposition leader Malcolm Turnbull over Tony Abbott. In the event, Prime Minister Julia Gillard survived the leadership spill and Oakeshott continued his support for the minority Labor government, although he again expressed support for Turnbull over Abbott shortly after the leadership spill was decided.

Oakeshott's support for Labor didn't play well with his constituents. Despite his large personal majority, both his federal and state electorates were still comfortably safe National seats in "traditional" two-party matchups. Proving this, Besseling lost Port Macquarie to the Nationals' Leslie Williams at the 2011 state election partly due to voter anger at Oakeshott's support for Gillard.

==== Immigration legislation ====
In February 2012, Oakeshott introduced a private member's bill to allow the Australian Minister of Immigration to authorise sending asylum seekers to any country that is part of the Bali Process. In June 2012, following the sinking of two asylum seeker boats in the Indian Ocean within a week that resulted in significant loss of life, the bill was brought up for immediate debate in the House of Representatives. The bill, along with an amendment by independent MP Andrew Wilkie to make the legislation valid only for 12 months, was passed in the House of Representatives with the support of government members and independents. The bill, seen as a compromise between the Government's desire to allow processing of asylum seekers in Malaysia and the reinstatement of the Pacific Solution sought by the opposition Coalition, was not supported by the opposition or the Australian Greens on the basis that it would allow processing of asylum seekers in countries that were not signatory to the United Nations Convention Relating to the Status of Refugees. An amendment to the bill, introduced by the Shadow Minister for Immigration & Citizenship Scott Morrison, to limit processing of asylum seekers to nations that had signed the convention was defeated. The Oakeshott bill was not passed by the Senate.

=== Retirement ===
Oakeshott retired from politics prior to the 2013 federal election, and did not contest his seat. It was subsequently won by the National Party candidate David Gillespie.

=== Comeback ===
In June 2016, Oakeshott announced his candidacy for a return to federal politics at the federal election on 2 July. He ran as an independent in Cowper, which now includes Port Macquarie following a redistribution. Multiple seat-level opinion polls in the seat of Cowper found incumbent National Luke Hartsuyker and Oakeshott neck and neck on the two-party vote. While Hartsuyker retained the seat, Oakeshott reduced the National majority from a comfortably safe 13.1 percent to a marginal 4.5 percent.

In January 2019, Oakeshott announced he would stand again in Cowper at the 2019 Australian federal election. He was unsuccessful in his bid to win the seat.

In October 2021 Oakeshott was named as an advisor for climate fund, Climate 200.

== Post-politics ==
In 2017, Oakeshott was among the first batch of students to begin studying an undergraduate medical degree at University of New South Wales's new Rural Clinical School Campus in Port Macquarie. He graduated in November 2022. Oakeshott said he aimed to work as a regional general practitioner in the Port Macquarie area.

== Private life ==
In May 2012, Oakeshott revealed that he suffers from Graves' disease.

New South Wales Legislative Assembly
Preceded by Wendy Machin	Member for Port Macquarie; 1996–2008	Succeeded by Peter Besseling
Parliament of Australia
Preceded by Mark Vaile	Member for Lyne; 2008–2013	Succeeded by David Gillespie
