= Electoral district of Port Macquarie =

State electoral district of New South Wales, Australia

Port Macquarie New South Wales—Legislative Assembly
- Interactive map of district boundaries from the 2023 state election
- State: New South Wales
- Dates current: 1988–present
- MP: Robert Dwyer
- Party: Liberal
- Namesake: Port Macquarie
- Electors: 63,320 (2025)
- Area: 1,459.69 km^{2} (563.6 sq mi)
- Demographic: Provincial and rural
Electorates around Port Macquarie:
Oxley	Oxley	Pacific Ocean
Oxley	Port Macquarie	Pacific Ocean
Myall Lakes	Myall Lakes	Pacific Ocean

Port Macquarie is an electoral district of the Legislative Assembly in the Australian state of New South Wales. It is represented by Robert Dwyer of the Liberal Party.

It presently includes parts of coastal Port Macquarie-Hastings City Council (including Port Macquarie, Dunbogan, Bonny Hills, Kendall, Kew, Laurieton, North Haven and West Haven) and the northeast of the Mid-Coast Council (including Coopernook, Lansdowne, Moorland, Hannam Vale, Johns River and Stewarts River). Since 1991, the district also includes Lord Howe Island.

While the Mid North Coast has been heavily conservative-voting throughout history, Port Macquarie is particularly conservative even by Mid North Coast standards. Labor has never won a federal or state seat that includes Port Macquarie or the surrounding suburbs. Port Macquarie was originally a National seat, but has been a Liberal seat since 2020.

== History ==
Port Macquarie was created in 1988, replacing Oxley (which was then recreated to the north-west of Port Macquarie in 1991). It had historically been a comfortably safe seat for the National Party. It is located in an area that has long been one of the more conservative areas of New South Wales. Dating to its time as Oxley, the Port Macquarie area had been held by a conservative party since the return to single-member seats in 1927, and had been in National hands for all but six years since 1945.

This tradition was broken in 2002, when three-term National member and shadow minister Rob Oakeshott resigned from the party to become an independent. He was handily reelected as an independent in 2003 and 2007. In 2003, he was returned with 82 percent of the two-party vote, making Port Macquarie the safest seat in the legislature.

Oakeshott resigned in 2008 to run in a by-election for the federal seat of Lyne, which was based on Port Macquarie at the time. He was succeeded by longtime friend and staffer Peter Besseling. At the next election, Besseling was swept out by the Nationals' Leslie Williams at the 2011 state election amid the massive Liberal-Nationals Coalition statewide landslide that year. This was due in part to local voter anger at Oakeshott's support for the minority federal Labor government. Despite Oakeshott's personal popularity, the Port Macquarie area was still National heartland. "Traditional" two-party matchups between the Nationals and Labor during Oakeshott and Besseling's tenures had always shown Port Macquarie as a comfortably safe National seat.

Proving this, Williams easily retained Port Macquarie in 2015. Despite suffering a 9.8 percent swing against Labor, she sat on a majority of 19 percent, making Port Macquarie the sixth-safest National seat and the 17th-safest Coalition seat.

In 2020 Williams defected to the Liberals whilst still member for Port Macquarie. It was the first time the seat had been held by a Liberal in its present incarnation. It marked the second time, after Oakeshott, that a member for Port Macquarie has quit the Nationals whilst holding the seat.

Prior to Williams' defection to the Liberals, the Liberal Party had never contested Port Macquarie in its current incarnation since 1988, ceding it to the Nationals. However the Liberals have previously won Port Macquarie in its previous iteration as Oxley in 1962 when then member Les Jordan too defected from the Nationals.

As part of the redistribution of electoral districts for the 2023 state election, a proposal was received to move Lord Howe Island back into the electorate of Sydney. However, the NSW Electoral Commission eventually decided to retain the island within the electorate of Port Macquarie, where it has been included since 1991.

== Members for Port Macquarie ==
Image	Member	Party	Term	Notes
	Bruce Jeffery (1944–)	National	19 March 1988 – 25 May 1991	
	Wendy Machin (1958–)	National	25 May 1991 – 28 August 1996	Resigned
	Rob Oakeshott (1969–)	National	30 November 1996 – 9 March 2002	Won by-election. Resigned to successfully enter federal politics at 2008 Lyne by-election
	Rob Oakeshott (1969–)	Independent	9 March 2002 – 13 August 2008	Won by-election. Resigned to successfully enter federal politics at 2008 Lyne by-election
	Peter Besseling (1970–)	Independent	18 October 2008 – 4 March 2011	Won by-election. Lost seat
	Leslie Williams (1960/61–)	National	4 March 2011 – 20 September 2020	Resigned
	Leslie Williams (1960/61–)	Liberal	20 September 2020 – 31 January 2025	Resigned
	Robert Dwyer	Liberal	15 March 2025 – present	Won by-election. Incumbent

== Election results ==
2025 Port Macquarie state by-election
Party	Candidate	Votes	%	±%
Liberal	Robert Dwyer	18,752	36.2	−3.3
National	Sean Gleeson	16,101	31.1	+5.5
Independent	Warwick Yonge	6,370	12.3	+12.3
Greens	Stuart Watson	5,184	10.0	+3.5
Legalise Cannabis	Megan Mathew	3,695	7.1	+3.0
Libertarian	Breelin Coetzer	1,712	3.3	+2.1
Total formal votes		51,814	96.5	−0.6
Informal votes		1,858	3.5	+0.6
Turnout		53,672	84.8	−5.1
Two-candidate-preferred result
Liberal	Robert Dwyer	22,273	53.5	−7.3
National	Sean Gleeson	19,387	46.5	+7.3
Liberal hold		Swing	−7.3	
