= Peter Besseling =

Australian politician

9th Mayor of Port Macquarie-Hastings
- In office 8 September 2012 – 8 May 2017
- Deputy: Trevor Sargeant; Adam Roberts; Justin Levido; Lisa Intemann
- Preceded by: Neil Porter (Administrator)
- Succeeded by: Lisa Intemann (acting)

Member of the New South Wales Parliament for Port Macquarie
- In office 18 October 2008 – 4 March 2011
- Preceded by: Rob Oakeshott
- Succeeded by: Leslie Williams

Personal details
- Born: 8 March 1970 (age 56) Penrith, New South Wales, Australia
- Party: Independent

Peter Edward Besseling (born 8 March 1970) is an Australian politician. Besseling was the Mayor of Port Macquarie-Hastings Council, from 8 September 2012 to 8 May 2017, as an independent. Besseling served as Member for the New South Wales state electoral district of Port Macquarie between 2008 and 2011. Besseling is now General Manager at Birdon Pty Ltd.

Prior to entering politics, he was a professional rugby union player.

== Rugby union playing record ==
Besseling played 15 games for the NSW Waratahs from 2000 to 2001 and is a former second-rower and 1999 Ken Catchpole Medallist.

== New South Wales political career ==
Besseling was elected as an independent member in the New South Wales Legislative Assembly for the seat of Port Macquarie; winning the seat in a 2008 by-election. The seat came open when the former member, independent Rob Oakeshott, resigned to make an ultimately successful run for the federal seat of Lyne. Besseling worked as a political adviser for his sometime rugby teammate Oakeshott for the previous three years.

Besseling won the seat with 35.9 percent of the primary vote and 54.5 percent of the two-party vote. This was a significant drop from Oakeshott's last victory in 2007; at the time of his resignation, Oakeshott sat on a majority of 28.2 percent, the safest in the Legislative Assembly. Alby Schultz, the Liberal Member for Hume, was seen campaigning a few times for Besseling, referring to him as "the pick of the candidates". Similar support was provided by Bill Heffernan, a Liberal Senator, sparking anger and resentment within the federal coalition.

In 2011 Besseling lost his seat to National Party candidate Leslie Williams, suffering a swing of 11 percent. It is suggested that his defeat was due to his association with Oakeshott, whose support kept the federal Labor government in office after the 2010 federal election. Port Macquarie had always been considered a National heartland, and had been a comfortably safe National seat in "traditional" two-party matchups with Labor even when Oakeshott held it without serious difficulty as an independent.

"Besseling's re-election campaign struck controversy when oil from his campaign bus caused an accident on the Oxley Highway that resulted in three people being seriously injured." While police investigations were inconclusive, it was believed that sabotage was the most likely cause for the missing sump plug that caused the leak. The political environment was very heated at the time.

Following his failure to win re-election, Besseling recommenced employment as a political advisor, working in the office of Rob Oakeshott.

== Local government ==
In 2012, Besseling was directly elected as Mayor; and secured three other Councillors to the Port Macquarie-Hastings Council on his independent election ticket. Besseling was reelected Mayor in September 2016, but then resigned in May 2017 to become General Manager at Birdon Pty Ltd. The subsequent by-election was won by Peta Pinson.

New South Wales Legislative Assembly
Preceded by Rob Oakeshott	Member for Port Macquarie; 2008 – 2011	Succeeded by Leslie Williams
Civic offices
Preceded by Neil Porter as Administrator	Mayor of Port Macquarie-Hastings; 2012 – 2017	Succeeded by Lisa Intemann (acting)
