= Electoral results for the Division of Macquarie =

Australian division election results

This is a list of electoral results for the Division of Macquarie in Australian federal elections from the division's creation in 1901 until the present.

== Members ==
Member	Party	Term
Sydney Smith	Free Trade	1901–1906
Ernest Carr	Labor	1906–1916
Ernest Carr	Nationalist	1916–1917
Samuel Nicholls	Labor	1917–1922
Arthur Manning	Nationalist	1922–1928
Ben Chifley	Labor	1928–1931
John Lawson	United Australia	1931–1940
Ben Chifley	Labor	1940–1951
Tony Luchetti	Labor	1951–1975
Reg Gillard	Liberal	1975–1980
Ross Free	Labor	1980–1984
Alasdair Webster	Liberal	1984–1993
Maggie Deahm	Labor	1993–1996
Kerry Bartlett	Liberal	1996–2007
Bob Debus	Labor	2007–2010
Louise Markus	Liberal	2010–2016
Susan Templeman	Labor	2016–present

== Election results ==
=== Elections in the 2020s ===
==== 2025 ====
2025 Australian federal election: Macquarie
Party	Candidate	Votes	%	±%
One Nation	Matthew Jacobson			
Liberal	Mike Creed			
Libertarian	Joaquim Eduardo De Lima			
Greens	Terry Morgan			
Labor	Susan Templeman			
Family First	Roger Gerard Bowen			
Total formal votes				
Informal votes				
Turnout				

==== 2022 ====
2022 Australian federal election: Macquarie
Party	Candidate	Votes	%	±%
Labor	Susan Templeman	41,025	42.98	+4.71
Liberal	Sarah Richards	32,980	34.55	−10.30
Greens	Tony Hickey	9,115	9.55	+0.40
One Nation	Tony Pettitt	4,955	5.19	+5.19
United Australia	Nicole Evans	2,774	2.91	−1.09
Animal Justice	Greg Keightley	2,013	2.11	−1.61
Informed Medical Options	Michelle Palmer	1,318	1.38	+1.38
Liberal Democrats	James Jackson	1,272	1.33	+1.33
Total formal votes		95,452	94.93	−0.79
Informal votes		5,095	5.07	+0.79
Turnout		100,547	93.05	−0.77
Two-party-preferred result
Labor	Susan Templeman	55,143	57.77	+7.58
Liberal	Sarah Richards	40,309	42.23	−7.58
Labor hold		Swing	+7.58	

Alluvial diagram for preference flows in the seat of Macquarie in the 2022 federal election. indicates at what stage the winning candidate had over 50% of the votes and was declared the winner.

=== Elections in the 2010s ===
==== 2019 ====
2019 Australian federal election: Macquarie
Party	Candidate	Votes	%	±%
Liberal	Sarah Richards	43,487	44.85	+6.64
Labor	Susan Templeman	37,106	38.27	+2.75
Greens	Kingsley Liu	8,870	9.15	−2.07
United Australia	Tony Pettitt	3,877	4.00	+4.00
Animal Justice	Greg Keightley	3,611	3.72	+0.93
Total formal votes		96,951	95.72	+2.25
Informal votes		4,338	4.28	−2.25
Turnout		101,289	93.82	+0.44
Two-party-preferred result
Labor	Susan Templeman	48,661	50.19	−2.00
Liberal	Sarah Richards	48,290	49.81	+2.00
Labor hold		Swing	−2.00	

==== 2016 ====
2016 Australian federal election: Macquarie
Party	Candidate	Votes	%	±%
Liberal	Louise Markus	34,946	38.21	−9.15
Labor	Susan Templeman	32,480	35.52	+4.52
Greens	Terry Morgan	10,257	11.22	+0.12
Christian Democrats	Catherine Lincoln	3,567	3.90	+0.88
Shooters, Fishers, Farmers	Jake Grizelj	3,550	3.88	+3.88
Animal Justice	Hal Jon Ginges	2,554	2.79	+2.79
Liberty Alliance	Carl Halley	1,693	1.85	+1.85
Justice	Liz Cooper	1,653	1.81	+1.81
Liberal Democrats	Olya Shornikov	752	0.82	+0.82
Total formal votes		91,452	93.47	−0.90
Informal votes		6,389	6.53	+0.90
Turnout		97,841	93.38	−2.65
Two-party-preferred result
Labor	Susan Templeman	47,733	52.19	+6.67
Liberal	Louise Markus	43,719	47.81	−6.67
Labor gain from Liberal		Swing	+6.67	

==== 2013 ====
2013 Australian federal election: Macquarie
Party	Candidate	Votes	%	±%
Liberal	Louise Markus	42,590	47.36	+2.89
Labor	Susan Templeman	27,872	31.00	−1.36
Greens	Danielle Wheeler	9,986	11.10	−2.99
Palmer United	Philip Maxwell	3,731	4.15	+4.15
Christian Democrats	Tony Piper	2,720	3.02	+0.87
Sex Party	Mark Littlejohn	1,776	1.98	+1.98
Australia First	Matt Hodgson	750	0.83	+0.06
Democratic Labour	Teresa Elaro	499	0.55	+0.55
Total formal votes		89,924	94.37	−0.15
Informal votes		5,362	5.63	+0.15
Turnout		95,286	94.63	−0.18
Two-party-preferred result
Liberal	Louise Markus	48,987	54.48	+3.22
Labor	Susan Templeman	40,937	45.52	−3.22
Liberal hold		Swing	+3.22	

==== 2010 ====
2010 Australian federal election: Macquarie
Party	Candidate	Votes	%	±%
Liberal	Louise Markus	38,867	44.47	−0.23
Labor	Susan Templeman	28,284	32.36	−5.75
Greens	Carmel McCallum	12,317	14.09	+3.11
Liberal Democrats	Peter Whelan	2,087	2.39	+2.19
Christian Democrats	Luke Portelli	1,883	2.15	−0.10
Independent	Amy Bell	1,778	2.03	+2.03
Family First	Jason Cornelius	922	1.05	−0.02
Australia First	John Bates	676	0.77	+0.77
Carers Alliance	Terry Tremethick	591	0.68	+0.68
Total formal votes		87,405	94.52	−1.83
Informal votes		5,067	5.48	+1.83
Turnout		92,472	94.78	−1.13
Two-party-preferred result
Liberal	Louise Markus	44,801	51.26	+1.54
Labor	Susan Templeman	42,604	48.74	−1.54
Liberal gain from Labor		Swing	+1.54	

=== Elections in the 2000s ===
==== 2007 ====
2007 Australian federal election: Macquarie
Party	Candidate	Votes	%	±%
Labor	Bob Debus	38,672	44.08	+17.13
Liberal	Kerry Bartlett	33,197	37.84	−14.93
Greens	Carmel McCallum	9,092	10.36	+1.94
Independent	Tim Williams	4,145	4.72	+3.49
Christian Democrats	Robert Gifford	1,702	1.94	+0.35
Family First	Charles Liptak	465	0.53	−0.60
Liberty & Democracy	Kirk Fletcher	355	0.40	+0.40
Citizens Electoral Council	Michael Segedin	99	0.11	−0.30
Total formal votes		87,727	96.44	+0.38
Informal votes		3,240	3.56	−0.38
Turnout		90,967	96.09	−0.09
Two-party-preferred result
Labor	Bob Debus	50,037	57.04	+6.57
Liberal	Kerry Bartlett	37,690	42.96	−6.57
Labor notional hold		Swing	+6.57	

The sitting member was Kerry Bartlett (Liberal) however a redistribution made it a notional Labor seat with a margin of 0.5%.

==== 2004 ====
2004 Australian federal election: Macquarie
Party	Candidate	Votes	%	±%
Liberal	Kerry Bartlett	42,021	53.27	+2.27
Labor	Mark Ptolemy	21,898	27.76	+0.93
Greens	Joel Macrae	8,561	10.85	+2.43
Christian Democrats	Brian Grigg	1,855	2.35	+2.27
Independent	Tim Williams	1,774	2.25	+2.25
Family First	Troy Geri	1,082	1.37	+1.37
Democrats	John Haydon	969	1.23	−4.23
No GST	Matthew Derrig	639	0.81	+0.81
Citizens Electoral Council	Michael Segedin	86	0.11	+0.11
Total formal votes		78,885	94.72	−1.43
Informal votes		4,394	5.28	+1.43
Turnout		83,279	95.16	+0.18
Two-party-preferred result
Liberal	Kerry Bartlett	46,482	58.92	+0.25
Labor	Mark Ptolemy	32,403	41.08	−0.25
Liberal hold		Swing	+0.25	

==== 2001 ====
2001 Australian federal election: Macquarie
Party	Candidate	Votes	%	±%
Liberal	Kerry Bartlett	40,225	51.00	+7.37
Labor	Adam Searle	21,160	26.83	−7.27
Greens	Leigh Williams	6,644	8.42	+5.05
Democrats	Les Majoros	4,304	5.46	−0.98
One Nation	Wayne Buckley	3,893	4.94	−5.29
Christian Democrats	Brian Grigg	1,559	1.98	+1.91
Save the ADI Site	Robert Warren	1,086	1.38	+1.38
Total formal votes		78,861	96.15	−0.89
Informal votes		3,160	3.85	+0.89
Turnout		82,031	95.30	
Two-party-preferred result
Liberal	Kerry Bartlett	46,273	58.67	+2.90
Labor	Adam Searle	32,598	41.33	−2.90
Liberal hold		Swing	+2.90	

=== Elections in the 1990s ===
==== 1998 ====
1998 Australian federal election: Macquarie
Party	Candidate	Votes	%	±%
Liberal	Kerry Bartlett	32,432	42.74	−5.36
Labor	Maggie Deahm	26,391	34.78	+1.15
One Nation	Les Sheather	7,870	10.37	+10.37
Democrats	Jon Rickard	4,895	6.45	−1.92
Greens	Adele Doust	2,563	3.38	−0.42
Christian Democrats	Shirley Grigg	1,510	1.99	+1.99
Natural Law	Michael Penny	222	0.29	+0.29
Total formal votes		75,883	96.94	+0.88
Informal votes		2,395	3.06	−0.88
Turnout		78,278	95.40	−1.18
Two-party-preferred result
Liberal	Kerry Bartlett	41,053	54.10	−2.26
Labor	Maggie Deahm	34,830	45.90	+2.26
Liberal hold		Swing	−2.26	

==== 1996 ====
1996 Australian federal election: Macquarie
Party	Candidate	Votes	%	±%
Liberal	Kerry Bartlett	35,199	48.09	+3.73
Labor	Maggie Deahm	24,614	33.63	−8.85
Democrats	Jon Rickard	6,127	8.37	+1.72
Greens	Carol Gaul	2,782	3.80	+0.01
Against Further Immigration	Warwick Tyler	1,806	2.47	+2.47
Call to Australia	Heather Kraus	1,753	2.40	+2.40
Independent	John McCall	906	1.24	+1.24
Total formal votes		73,187	96.06	−1.44
Informal votes		3,004	3.94	+1.44
Turnout		76,191	96.58	+0.53
Two-party-preferred result
Liberal	Kerry Bartlett	41,045	56.36	+6.48
Labor	Maggie Deahm	31,780	43.64	−6.48
Liberal gain from Labor		Swing	+6.48	

==== 1993 ====
1993 Australian federal election: Macquarie
Party	Candidate	Votes	%	±%
Liberal	Alasdair Webster	30,809	44.36	−0.15
Labor	Maggie Deahm	29,504	42.49	+9.95
Democrats	Jon Rickard	4,621	6.65	−6.81
Greens	Petar Ivanovski	2,633	3.79	+3.79
Independent	Garth Hutchinson	1,531	2.20	+2.20
Natural Law	Roger Fay	347	0.50	+0.50
Total formal votes		69,445	97.50	−0.24
Informal votes		1,780	2.50	+0.24
Turnout		71,225	96.05	
Two-party-preferred result
Labor	Maggie Deahm	34,783	50.12	+1.90
Liberal	Alasdair Webster	34,619	49.88	−1.90
Labor gain from Liberal		Swing	+1.90	

==== 1990 ====
1990 Australian federal election: Macquarie
Party	Candidate	Votes	%	±%
Liberal	Alasdair Webster	31,268	47.0	−3.3
Labor	John Marsh	20,932	31.4	−7.3
Democrats	Bruce Forbes	8,500	12.8	+1.8
Independent	John Baker	4,328	6.5	+6.5
Independent	Stuart Douglass	914	1.4	+1.4
Australian Green	Leslie Newton	639	1.0	+0.5
Total formal votes		66,581	97.6	
Informal votes		1,614	2.4	
Turnout		68,195	95.0	
Two-party-preferred result
Liberal	Alasdair Webster	35,631	53.6	−2.2
Labor	John Marsh	30,792	46.4	+2.2
Liberal hold		Swing	−2.2	

=== Elections in the 1980s ===
==== 1987 ====
1987 Australian federal election: Macquarie
Party	Candidate	Votes	%	±%
Liberal	Alasdair Webster	30,010	50.3	+9.2
Labor	David March	23,096	38.7	−1.9
Democrats	Bruce Forbes	6,582	11.0	+3.7
Total formal votes		59,688	96.0	
Informal votes		2,497	4.0	
Turnout		62,185	93.5	
Two-party-preferred result
Liberal	Alasdair Webster	33,300	55.8	+4.4
Labor	David March	26,383	44.2	−4.4
Liberal hold		Swing	+4.4	

==== 1984 ====
1984 Australian federal election: Macquarie
Party	Candidate	Votes	%	±%
Liberal	Alasdair Webster	22,796	41.1	−5.5
Labor	Garry Cronan	22,565	40.6	−1.9
Democrats	Dick Jackson-Hope	4,053	7.3	−0.2
Independent	Peter Quirk	3,069	5.5	+5.5
National	Paul McGirr	3,036	5.5	+5.5
Total formal votes		55,519	94.8	
Informal votes		3,052	5.2	
Turnout		58,571	93.5	
Two-party-preferred result
Liberal	Alasdair Webster	28,529	51.4	+1.9
Labor	Garry Cronan	26,981	48.6	−1.9
Liberal gain from Labor		Swing	+1.9	

==== 1983 ====
1983 Australian federal election: Macquarie
Party	Candidate	Votes	%	±%
Labor	Ross Free	50,272	57.3	+10.6
Liberal	Stephen Screech	30,966	35.3	−8.7
Democrats	Richard Jackson-Hope	6,573	7.5	+1.7
Total formal votes		87,811	98.0	
Informal votes		1,773	2.0	
Turnout		89,584	95.9	
Two-party-preferred result
Labor	Ross Free		61.8	+9.0
Liberal	Stephen Screech		38.2	−9.0
Labor hold		Swing	+9.0	

==== 1980 ====
1980 Australian federal election: Macquarie
Party	Candidate	Votes	%	±%
Labor	Ross Free	36,814	46.7	+7.3
Liberal	Reg Gillard	34,699	44.0	+2.2
Democrats	Richard Jackson-Hope	4,603	5.8	−5.0
Independent	Raymond Butcher	1,958	2.5	+2.5
Independent	Ronald Stanton	447	0.6	+0.6
Independent	Ian Perry	377	0.5	+0.5
Total formal votes		78,898	97.3	
Informal votes		2,194	2.7	
Turnout		81,092	94.5	
Two-party-preferred result
Labor	Ross Free	41,687	52.8	+4.5
Liberal	Reg Gillard	37,211	47.2	−4.5
Labor gain from Liberal		Swing	+4.5	

=== Elections in the 1970s ===
==== 1977 ====
1977 Australian federal election: Macquarie
Party	Candidate	Votes	%	±%
Liberal	Reg Gillard	28,299	41.8	−11.1
Labor	Ross Free	26,651	39.4	−4.6
Democrats	Peter Monaghan	7,328	10.8	+10.8
Independent	Michael Barratt	4,849	7.2	+7.2
Progress	Alyn Foster	513	0.8	−1.1
Total formal votes		67,640	97.7	
Informal votes		1,622	2.3	
Turnout		69,262	94.6	
Two-party-preferred result
Liberal	Reg Gillard	34,966	51.7	−2.6
Labor	Ross Free	32,674	48.3	+2.6
Liberal hold		Swing	−2.6	

==== 1975 ====
1975 Australian federal election: Macquarie
Party	Candidate	Votes	%	±%
Liberal	Reg Gillard	37,739	50.2	+14.9
Labor	Ross Free	35,131	46.7	−9.4
Workers	Murray Busch	1,392	1.9	+1.9
Independent	Norman Lee	524	0.7	+0.7
Independent	Ian Perry	451	0.6	+0.6
Total formal votes		75,237	98.2	
Informal votes		1,390	1.8	
Turnout		76,627	95.5	
Two-party-preferred result
Liberal	Reg Gillard		51.6	+10.3
Labor	Ross Free		48.4	−10.3
Liberal gain from Labor		Swing	+10.3	

==== 1974 ====
1974 Australian federal election: Macquarie
Party	Candidate	Votes	%	±%
Labor	Tony Luchetti	39,472	56.1	−2.7
Liberal	Malcolm Mackay	24,849	35.3	+9.9
Country	Michael Hunt	4,453	6.3	−4.3
Australia	Gregory Woodward	1,061	1.5	+1.5
Country	Steven Parrott	579	0.8	+0.8
Total formal votes		70,414	98.5	
Informal votes		1,084	1.5	
Turnout		71,498	95.8	
Two-party-preferred result
Labor	Tony Luchetti		58.7	−1.9
Liberal	Malcolm Mackay		41.3	+1.9
Labor hold		Swing	−1.9	

==== 1972 ====
1972 Australian federal election: Macquarie
Party	Candidate	Votes	%	±%
Labor	Tony Luchetti	36,655	58.8	+0.7
Liberal	Basil Genders	15,655	25.4	−8.6
Country	Frank Wolstenholme	7,045	11.4	+11.4
Democratic Labor	Leslie Clarke	2,652	4.3	−1.1
Total formal votes		61,595	98.6	
Informal votes		892	1.4	
Turnout		62,487	95.4	
Two-party-preferred result
Labor	Tony Luchetti		60.6	−2.0
Liberal	Basil Genders		39.4	+2.0
Labor hold		Swing	−2.0	

=== Elections in the 1960s ===
==== 1969 ====
1969 Australian federal election: Macquarie
Party	Candidate	Votes	%	±%
Labor	Tony Luchetti	31,403	58.1	+6.7
Liberal	John MacDonnell	18,391	34.0	−5.5
Democratic Labor	Leslie Clarke	2,926	5.4	−2.8
Australia	Norman Lee	1,343	2.5	+2.5
Total formal votes		54,063	98.1	
Informal votes		1,016	1.9	
Turnout		55,079	95.3	
Two-party-preferred result
Labor	Tony Luchetti		62.6	+9.4
Liberal	John MacDonnell		37.4	−9.4
Labor hold		Swing	+9.4	

==== 1966 ====
1966 Australian federal election: Macquarie
Party	Candidate	Votes	%	±%
Labor	Tony Luchetti	23,973	52.4	−5.2
Liberal	John Heesh	17,630	38.5	−3.9
Democratic Labor	Richard Ambrose	3,762	8.2	+8.2
Independent	Allan Fuary	372	0.8	+0.8
Total formal votes		45,737	97.2	
Informal votes		1,295	2.8	
Turnout		47,032	95.1	
Two-party-preferred result
Labor	Tony Luchetti		54.2	−3.4
Liberal	John Heesh		45.8	+3.4
Labor hold		Swing	−3.4	

==== 1963 ====
1963 Australian federal election: Macquarie
Party	Candidate	Votes	%	±%
Labor	Tony Luchetti	25,649	57.6	−5.5
Liberal	John Heesh	18,868	42.4	+10.4
Total formal votes		44,517	98.7	
Informal votes		597	1.3	
Turnout		45,114	95.9	
Labor hold		Swing	−6.5	

==== 1961 ====
1961 Australian federal election: Macquarie
Party	Candidate	Votes	%	±%
Labor	Tony Luchetti	26,803	63.1	+5.0
Liberal	John Heesh	13,583	32.0	−3.5
Democratic Labor	Frank Mackenzie	2,063	4.9	−1.5
Total formal votes		42,449	97.7	
Informal votes		989	2.3	
Turnout		43,438	95.8	
Two-party-preferred result
Labor	Tony Luchetti		64.1	+4.9
Liberal	John Heesh		35.9	−4.9
Labor hold		Swing	+4.9	

=== Elections in the 1950s ===
==== 1958 ====
1958 Australian federal election: Macquarie
Party	Candidate	Votes	%	±%
Labor	Tony Luchetti	23,646	58.1	+2.2
Liberal	Norman Leven	14,476	35.5	−5.9
Democratic Labor	Hugh Dougherty	2,611	6.4	+6.4
Total formal votes		40,733	97.8	
Informal votes		933	2.2	
Turnout		41,666	95.4	
Two-party-preferred result
Labor	Tony Luchetti		59.2	+0.9
Liberal	Norman Leven		40.8	−0.9
Labor hold		Swing	+0.9	

==== 1955 ====
1955 Australian federal election: Macquarie
Party	Candidate	Votes	%	±%
Labor	Tony Luchetti	22,461	55.9	−1.0
Liberal	Norman Leven	16,662	41.4	+1.1
Communist	Vernon Moffitt	1,075	2.7	−0.1
Total formal votes		40,198	98.0	
Informal votes		828	2.0	
Turnout		41,026	95.8	
Two-party-preferred result
Labor	Tony Luchetti		58.3	−1.2
Liberal	Norman Leven		41.7	+1.2
Labor hold		Swing	−1.2	

==== 1954 ====
1954 Australian federal election: Macquarie
Party	Candidate	Votes	%	±%
Labor	Tony Luchetti	22,388	60.4	−1.4
Liberal	Horace Brownlow	13,484	36.3	−1.9
Communist	John King	1,224	3.3	+3.3
Total formal votes		37,096	99.1	
Informal votes		340	0.9	
Turnout		37,436	97.1	
Two-party-preferred result
Labor	Tony Luchetti		63.5	+1.7
Liberal	Horace Brownlow		36.5	−1.7
Labor hold		Swing	+1.7	

==== 1951 by-election ====
1951 Macquarie by-election
Party	Candidate	Votes	%	±%
Labor	Tony Luchetti	18,426	52.3	−9.5
Liberal	William Hannam	12,356	35.1	−3.1
Independent Labor	William Blanchard	3,853	10.9	+10.9
Communist	Vernon Moffitt	575	1.6	+1.6
Total formal votes		35,210	99.1	
Informal votes		325	0.9	
Turnout		35,535	90.5	
Two-party-preferred result
Labor	Tony Luchetti		61.0	−0.8
Liberal	William Hannam		39.0	+0.8
Labor hold		Swing	−0.8	

==== 1951 ====
1951 Australian federal election: Macquarie
Party	Candidate	Votes	%	±%
Labor	Ben Chifley	23,136	61.8	+4.1
Liberal	Bob Cotton	14,325	38.2	−0.6
Total formal votes		37,461	98.5	
Informal votes		555	1.5	
Turnout		38,016	96.9	
Labor hold		Swing	+0.8	

=== Elections in the 1940s ===
==== 1949 ====
1949 Australian federal election: Macquarie
Party	Candidate	Votes	%	±%
Labor	Ben Chifley	21,683	57.7	−5.1
Liberal	Bob Cotton	14,585	38.8	+13.3
Communist	John King	1,320	3.5	+3.5
Total formal votes		37,588	98.8	
Informal votes		441	1.2	
Turnout		38,029	97.6	
Two-party-preferred result
Labor	Ben Chifley		61.0	−4.4
Liberal	Bob Cotton		39.0	+4.4
Labor hold		Swing	−4.4	

==== 1946 ====
1946 Australian federal election: Macquarie
Party	Candidate	Votes	%	±%
Labor	Ben Chifley	33,412	58.4	−6.6
Liberal	Eric Spooner	17,106	29.9	+2.3
Country	Cecil Williams	5,342	9.3	+9.3
Independent	John Sutton	1,344	2.3	+2.3
Total formal votes		57,204	98.1	
Informal votes		1,121	1.9	
Turnout		58,325	93.6	
Two-party-preferred result
Labor	Ben Chifley		60.5	−8.3
Liberal	Eric Spooner		39.5	+8.3
Labor hold		Swing	−8.3	

==== 1943 ====
1943 Australian federal election: Macquarie
Party	Candidate	Votes	%	±%
Labor	Ben Chifley	36,937	65.0	+20.4
United Australia	Arthur Hebblewhite	15,693	27.6	−12.7
One Parliament	Albert Walker	2,766	4.9	+4.9
Independent Country	Millie Sullivan	1,471	2.6	+2.6
Total formal votes		56,837	98.1	
Informal votes		1,120	1.9	
Turnout		57,987	93.6	
Two-party-preferred result
Labor	Ben Chifley		68.8	+10.7
United Australia	Arthur Hebblewhite		31.2	−10.7
Labor hold		Swing	+10.7	

==== 1940 ====
1940 Australian federal election: Macquarie
Party	Candidate	Votes	%	±%
Labor	Ben Chifley	22,660	44.6	−3.3
United Australia	John Lawson	20,468	40.3	−11.8
Labor (N-C)	Bernard Cunningham	7,660	15.1	+15.1
Total formal votes		50,788	98.7	
Informal votes		665	1.3	
Turnout		51,453	94.2	
Two-party-preferred result
Labor	Ben Chifley	29,493	58.1	+10.2
United Australia	John Lawson	21,295	41.9	−10.2
Labor gain from United Australia		Swing	+10.2	

=== Elections in the 1930s ===
==== 1937 ====
1937 Australian federal election: Macquarie
Party	Candidate	Votes	%	±%
United Australia	John Lawson	26,392	52.1	+6.8
Labor	Tony Luchetti	24,272	47.9	+27.1
Total formal votes		50,664	98.4	
Informal votes		827	1.6	
Turnout		51,491	98.6	
United Australia hold		Swing	−1.3	

==== 1934 ====
1934 Australian federal election: Macquarie
Party	Candidate	Votes	%	±%
United Australia	John Lawson	22,010	45.3	−0.3
Labor (NSW)	Tony Luchetti	14,506	29.8	+8.3
Labor	Ben Chifley	10,114	20.8	−6.0
Social Credit	Edward Smythe	1,099	2.3	+2.3
Communist	Jock Jamieson	876	1.8	+0.5
Total formal votes		48,605	95.6	
Informal votes		2,226	4.4	
Turnout		50,831	96.7	
Two-party-preferred result
United Australia	John Lawson	25,934	53.4	+0.7
Labor (NSW)	Tony Luchetti	22,671	46.6	+46.6
United Australia hold		Swing	+0.7	

==== 1931 ====
1931 Australian federal election: Macquarie
Party	Candidate	Votes	%	±%
United Australia	John Lawson	19,381	49.1	+14.7
Labor	Ben Chifley	11,085	28.1	−37.5
Labor (NSW)	Tony Luchetti	8,539	21.6	+21.6
Communist	Robert Deveney	499	1.3	+1.3
Total formal votes		39,504	96.1	
Informal votes		1,582	3.9	
Turnout		41,086	94.8	
Two-party-preferred result
United Australia	John Lawson	19,980	50.6	+16.2
Labor	Ben Chifley	19,524	49.4	−16.2
United Australia gain from Labor		Swing	+16.2	

=== Elections in the 1920s ===
==== 1929 ====
1929 Australian federal election: Macquarie
Party	Candidate	Votes	%	±%
Labor	Ben Chifley	25,349	65.6	+10.7
Nationalist	Charles Dash	13,271	34.4	−10.7
Total formal votes		38,620	97.0	
Informal votes		1,204	2.0	
Turnout		39,824	96.0	
Labor hold		Swing	+10.7	

==== 1928 ====
1928 Australian federal election: Macquarie
Party	Candidate	Votes	%	±%
Labor	Ben Chifley	20,155	54.9	+6.2
Nationalist	Arthur Manning	16,577	45.1	−6.2
Total formal votes		36,732	96.2	
Informal votes		1,439	3.8	
Turnout		38,171	94.5	
Labor gain from Nationalist		Swing	+6.2	

==== 1925 ====
1925 Australian federal election: Macquarie
Party	Candidate	Votes	%	±%
Nationalist	Arthur Manning	18,456	51.3	+7.0
Labor	Ben Chifley	17,553	48.7	+0.7
Total formal votes		36,009	98.4	
Informal votes		588	1.6	
Turnout		36,597	92.4	
Nationalist hold		Swing	+1.1	

==== 1922 ====
1922 Australian federal election: Macquarie
Party	Candidate	Votes	%	±%
Labor	Samuel Nicholls	10,406	48.0	−2.4
Nationalist	Arthur Manning	9,595	44.3	−5.3
Independent	John Miller	1,674	7.7	+7.7
Total formal votes		21,675	95.3	
Informal votes		1,073	4.7	
Turnout		22,748	59.2	
Two-party-preferred result
Nationalist	Arthur Manning	10,880	50.2	+0.6
Labor	Samuel Nicholls	10,795	49.8	−0.6
Nationalist gain from Labor		Swing	+0.6	

=== Elections in the 1910s ===
==== 1919 ====
1919 Australian federal election: Macquarie
Party	Candidate	Votes	%	±%
Labor	Samuel Nicholls	13,455	53.2	+3.2
Nationalist	Ernest Carr	11,859	46.8	−3.2
Total formal votes		25,314	98.4	
Informal votes		407	1.6	
Turnout		25,721	73.3	
Labor hold		Swing	+3.2	

==== 1917 ====
1917 Australian federal election: Macquarie
Party	Candidate	Votes	%	±%
Labor	Samuel Nicholls	13,566	50.0	−3.3
Nationalist	Ernest Carr	13,557	50.0	+3.3
Total formal votes		27,123	97.6	
Informal votes		655	2.4	
Turnout		27,778	76.3	
Labor hold		Swing	−3.3	

==== 1914 ====
1914 Australian federal election: Macquarie
Party	Candidate	Votes	%	±%
Labor	Ernest Carr	12,888	53.3	+3.3
Liberal	Robert Moore	11,288	46.7	−0.2
Total formal votes		24,176	97.8	
Informal votes		538	2.2	
Turnout		24,714	74.3	
Labor hold		Swing	+1.7	

==== 1913 ====
1913 Australian federal election: Macquarie
Party	Candidate	Votes	%	±%
Labor	Ernest Carr	11,163	50.0	−9.1
Liberal	Robert Moore	10,451	46.9	+6.0
Independent	Henry Fletcher	693	3.1	+3.1
Total formal votes		22,307	95.6	
Informal votes		1,015	4.4	
Turnout		23,322	66.9	
Labor hold		Swing	−7.5	

==== 1910 ====
1910 Australian federal election: Macquarie
Party	Candidate	Votes	%	±%
Labour	Ernest Carr	9,875	56.5	+5.2
Liberal	Alfred Conroy	7,618	43.5	−5.2
Total formal votes		17,493	98.6	
Informal votes		248	1.4	
Turnout		17,741	70.2	
Labour hold		Swing	+5.2	

=== Elections in the 1900s ===
==== 1906 ====
1906 Australian federal election: Macquarie
Party	Candidate	Votes	%	±%
Labour	Ernest Carr	7,121	51.3	+51.3
Anti-Socialist	Sydney Smith	6,760	48.7	−5.3
Total formal votes		13,881	96.4	
Informal votes		520	3.6	
Turnout		14,401	58.7	
Labour gain from Anti-Socialist		Swing	+51.3	

==== 1903 ====
1903 Australian federal election: Macquarie
Party	Candidate	Votes	%	±%
Free Trade	Sydney Smith	6,410	54.0	+0.1
Protectionist	William Sandford	5,450	46.0	−0.1
Total formal votes		11,860	98.6	
Informal votes		170	1.4	
Turnout		12,030	58.8	
Free Trade hold		Swing	+0.1	

==== 1901 ====
1901 Australian federal election: Macquarie
Party	Candidate	Votes	%	±%
Free Trade	Sydney Smith	3,846	53.9	+53.9
Protectionist	William Ferguson	3,285	46.1	+46.1
Total formal votes		7,131	98.2	
Informal votes		130	1.8	
Turnout		7,261	63.4	
Free Trade win		(new seat)		
