= Electoral results for the district of Blue Mountains =

Election results for Blue Mountains, New South Wales, Australia

Electoral district of Blue Mountains, an electoral district of the Legislative Assembly in the Australian state of New South Wales, was established in 1968.

Election	Member	Party
1968	Harold Coates	Independent
1971	Harold Coates	Independent
1973	Harold Coates	Independent
1976	Mick Clough	Labor
1978	Mick Clough	Labor
1981	Bob Debus	Labor
1984	Bob Debus	Labor
1988	Barry Morris	Liberal
1991	Barry Morris	Liberal
1995	Bob Debus	Labor
1999	Bob Debus	Labor
2003	Bob Debus	Labor
2007	Phil Koperberg	Labor
2011	Roza Sage	Liberal
2015	Trish Doyle	Labor
2019	Trish Doyle	Labor
2023	Trish Doyle	Labor

== Election results ==
=== Elections in the 2020s ===
==== 2023 ====
2023 New South Wales state election: Blue Mountains
Party	Candidate	Votes	%	±%
Labor	Trish Doyle	28,613	53.9	+8.2
Liberal	Sophie-Anne Bruce	12,640	23.8	−5.7
Greens	Jenna Condie	6,669	12.6	+0.5
Animal Justice	Greg Keightley	2,285	4.3	+0.4
Informed Medical Options	Michelle Palmer	1,901	3.6	+3.6
Sustainable Australia	Richard Marschall	948	1.8	−1.1
Total formal votes		53,056	97.9	+0.3
Informal votes		1,143	2.1	−0.3
Turnout		54,199	91.7	−1.2
Two-party-preferred result
Labor	Trish Doyle	35,536	71.9	+8.3
Liberal	Sophie-Anne Bruce	13,893	28.1	−8.3
Labor hold		Swing	+8.3	

=== Elections in the 2010s ===
==== 2019 ====
2019 New South Wales state election: Blue Mountains
Party	Candidate	Votes	%	±%
Labor	Trish Doyle	23,022	46.77	+5.58
Liberal	Owen Laffin	13,982	28.40	−7.11
Greens	Kingsley Liu	5,993	12.17	−4.07
Animal Justice	Gregory Keightley	2,008	4.08	+4.08
Christian Democrats	Cameron Phillips	1,786	3.63	+0.52
Sustainable Australia	Richard Marschall	1,496	3.04	+3.04
Keep Sydney Open	Mark Pigott	941	1.91	+1.91
Total formal votes		49,228	97.52	+0.04
Informal votes		1,250	2.48	−0.04
Turnout		50,478	91.97	−1.33
Two-party-preferred result
Labor	Trish Doyle	28,834	64.86	+6.71
Liberal	Owen Laffin	15,620	35.14	−6.71
Labor hold		Swing	+6.71	

==== 2015 ====
2015 New South Wales state election: Blue Mountains
Party	Candidate	Votes	%	±%
Labor	Trish Doyle	19,995	41.2	+18.7
Liberal	Roza Sage	17,241	35.5	−4.1
Greens	Alandra Tasire	7,888	16.2	−0.7
Christian Democrats	Tony Piper	1,507	3.1	−1.1
Independent	Mark Harrison	1,470	3.0	+3.0
No Land Tax	Gianna Maiorana	450	0.9	+0.9
Total formal votes		48,551	97.5	+0.5
Informal votes		1,252	2.5	−0.5
Turnout		49,803	93.3	+0.7
Two-party-preferred result
Labor	Trish Doyle	25,866	58.1	+13.5
Liberal	Roza Sage	18,616	41.9	−13.5
Labor gain from Liberal		Swing	+13.5	

==== 2011 ====
2011 New South Wales state election: Blue Mountains
Party	Candidate	Votes	%	±%
Liberal	Roza Sage	17,681	39.1	+10.6
Labor	Trish Doyle	10,253	22.7	−18.1
Independent	Janet Mays	7,804	17.3	+17.3
Greens	Kerrin O'Grady	7,647	16.9	+0.7
Christian Democrats	Merv Cox	1,841	4.1	+4.1
Total formal votes		45,226	97.5	−0.4
Informal votes		1,141	2.5	+0.4
Turnout		46,367	94.0	
Two-party-preferred result
Liberal	Roza Sage	20,736	54.7	+15.8
Labor	Trish Doyle	17,144	45.3	−15.8
Liberal gain from Labor		Swing	+15.8	

=== Elections in the 2000s ===
==== 2007 ====
2007 New South Wales state election: Blue Mountains
Party	Candidate	Votes	%	±%
Labor	Phil Koperberg	17,449	40.8	−4.8
Liberal	Michael Paag	12,179	28.5	+1.2
Greens	Pippa McInnes	6,947	16.2	−1.0
Independent	Robert Stock	4,700	11.0	+11.0
AAFI	Robert Dwight	837	2.0	+2.0
Outdoor Recreation	Bob Wilcox	675	1.6	+1.6
Total formal votes		42,787	97.9	−0.1
Informal votes		922	2.1	+0.1
Turnout		43,709	93.5	
Two-party-preferred result
Labor	Phil Koperberg	22,413	61.1	−3.7
Liberal	Michael Paag	14,298	38.9	+3.7
Labor hold		Swing	−3.7	

==== 2003 ====
2003 New South Wales state election: Blue Mountains
Party	Candidate	Votes	%	±%
Labor	Bob Debus	19,167	45.6	+0.7
Liberal	Quentin Cook	11,496	27.4	−0.5
Greens	Pippa McInnes	7,223	17.2	+11.1
Christian Democrats	Brian Grigg	2,224	5.3	+0.6
Democrats	Esther Scholem	906	2.2	−5.0
One Nation	George Grivas	855	2.0	−4.8
Unity	Ay Tan	159	0.4	+0.4
Total formal votes		42,030	98.0	−0.3
Informal votes		839	2.0	+0.3
Turnout		42,869	92.7	
Two-party-preferred result
Labor	Bob Debus	24,410	64.8	+3.0
Liberal	Quentin Cook	13,283	35.2	−3.0
Labor hold		Swing	+3.0	

=== Elections in the 1990s ===
==== 1999 ====
1999 New South Wales state election: Blue Mountains
Party	Candidate	Votes	%	±%
Labor	Bob Debus	18,474	44.9	+7.4
Liberal	Jennifer Scott	11,464	27.9	−0.6
Democrats	Stephen Lear	2,944	7.2	+0.3
One Nation	Wayne Buckley	2,777	6.8	+6.8
Greens	Adele Doust	2,528	6.1	+6.1
Christian Democrats	Shirley Grigg	1,954	4.7	+0.8
Earthsave	Catherine Bell	619	1.5	+1.5
AAFI	Margaret Anderson	378	0.9	+0.9
Total formal votes		41,138	98.3	+1.5
Informal votes		702	1.7	−1.5
Turnout		41,840	93.8	
Two-party-preferred result
Labor	Bob Debus	22,623	61.8	+9.5
Liberal	Jennifer Scott	13,997	38.2	−9.5
Labor hold		Swing	+9.5	

==== 1995 ====
1995 New South Wales state election: Blue Mountains
Party	Candidate	Votes	%	±%
Labor	Bob Debus	13,412	37.4	+1.1
Liberal	Jennifer Scott	9,860	27.5	−14.4
Independent	Barry Morris	5,951	16.6	+16.6
Democrats	Jon Rickard	2,489	6.9	−1.8
Independent	Carol Gaul	2,136	6.0	+6.0
Call to Australia	Warren Kinny	1,430	4.0	−0.1
Independent	William Mulcahy	303	0.8	−1.5
Natural Law	Stephanie Chambers	180	0.5	+0.5
Independent	Bert Ackland	93	0.3	+0.3
Total formal votes		35,854	96.8	+2.4
Informal votes		1,193	3.2	−2.4
Turnout		37,047	97.4	
Two-party-preferred result
Labor	Bob Debus	17,227	52.5	+5.2
Liberal	Jennifer Scott	15,577	47.5	−5.2
Labor gain from Liberal		Swing	+5.2	

==== 1991 ====
1991 New South Wales state election: Blue Mountains
Party	Candidate	Votes	%	±%
Liberal	Barry Morris	13,469	41.9	−3.2
Labor	Jim Angel	11,667	36.3	−7.1
Democrats	Steve Bailey	2,799	8.7	−1.3
Call to Australia	Shirley Grigg	1,317	4.1	+3.4
Independent	Bob Kennedy	1,029	3.2	+3.2
Independent	William Mulcahy	745	2.3	+2.3
Independent	Colin Slade	744	2.3	+2.3
Country Residents	Paul Arico	373	1.2	+1.2
Total formal votes		32,143	94.4	−3.2
Informal votes		1,913	5.6	+3.2
Turnout		34,056	93.5	
Two-party-preferred result
Liberal	Barry Morris	15,663	52.6	+2.1
Labor	Jim Angel	14,093	47.4	−2.1
Liberal hold		Swing	+2.1	

=== Elections in the 1980s ===
==== 1988 ====
1988 New South Wales state election: Blue Mountains
Party	Candidate	Votes	%	±%
Liberal	Barry Morris	13,551	45.6	+10.1
Labor	Bob Debus	13,006	43.7	−5.9
Democrats	Bruce Forbes	3,192	10.7	+3.2
Total formal votes		29,749	97.6	−0.6
Informal votes		723	2.4	+0.6
Turnout		30,472	93.5	
Two-party-preferred result
Liberal	Barry Morris	14,701	50.3	+4.9
Labor	Bob Debus	14,503	49.7	−4.9
Liberal gain from Labor		Swing	+4.9	

==== 1984 ====
1984 New South Wales state election: Blue Mountains
Party	Candidate	Votes	%	±%
Labor	Bob Debus	16,830	48.5	−9.9
Liberal	Margaret Bradshaw	12,962	37.3	−2.2
Democrats	Steve Franklin	2,600	7.5	+7.5
Call to Australia	Bruce Fry	2,347	6.8	+6.8
Total formal votes		34,739	98.4	+0.8
Informal votes		579	1.6	−0.8
Turnout		35,318	92.3	+0.9
Two-party-preferred result
Labor	Bob Debus	18,186	53.5	−6.1
Liberal	Margaret Bradshaw	15,832	46.5	+6.1
Labor hold		Swing	−6.1	

==== 1981 ====
1981 New South Wales state election: Blue Mountains
Party	Candidate	Votes	%	±%
Labor	Bob Debus	18,682	58.4	−3.5
Liberal	Reg Gillard	12,637	39.5	+39.5
Independent	Harry Marsh	696	2.2	+2.2
Total formal votes		32,015	97.6	
Informal votes		784	2.4	
Turnout		32,799	91.4	
Two-party-preferred result
Labor	Bob Debus	18,782	59.6	−0.5
Liberal	Reg Gillard	12,737	40.4	+40.4
Labor hold		Swing	−0.5	

=== Elections in the 1970s ===
==== 1978 ====
1978 New South Wales state election: Blue Mountains
Party	Candidate	Votes	%	±%
Labor	Mick Clough	15,187	61.9	+11.4
Independent	Harold Coates	8,050	32.8	−16.7
Democrats	William Player	1,307	5.3	+5.3
Total formal votes		24,544	98.4	+0.1
Informal votes		410	1.6	−0.1
Turnout		24,954	93.0	−0.5
Two-candidate-preferred result
Labor	Mick Clough	15,841	64.5	+14.0
Independent	Harold Coates	8,703	35.5	−14.0
Labor hold		Swing	+14.0	

==== 1976 ====
1976 New South Wales state election: Blue Mountains
Party	Candidate	Votes	%	±%
Labor	Mick Clough	11,957	50.5	+8.6
Independent	Harold Coates	11,721	49.5	−5.4
Total formal votes		23,678	98.3	−0.3
Informal votes		410	1.7	+0.3
Turnout		24,088	93.5	−0.5
Labor gain from Independent		Swing	+7.0	

==== 1973 ====
1973 New South Wales state election: Blue Mountains
Party	Candidate	Votes	%	±%
Independent	Harold Coates	1,229	54.9	+0.1
Labor	Mick Clough	9,339	41.9	+2.5
Democratic Labor	Joseph Conroy	709	3.2	−0.8
Total formal votes		22,277	98.6	
Informal votes		314	1.4	
Turnout		22,591	94.0	
Two-candidate-preferred result
Independent	Harold Coates	12,584	56.5	−1.2
Labor	Mick Clough	9,693	43.5	+1.2
Independent hold		Swing	−1.2	

==== 1971 ====
1971 New South Wales state election: Blue Mountains
Party	Candidate	Votes	%	±%
Independent	Harold Coates	11,271	54.8	−2.0
Labor	James Collins	8,101	39.4	−1.1
Democratic Labor	Kenneth Brown	812	3.9	+1.2
Independent	Frederick Lamb	399	1.9	+1.9
Total formal votes		20,583	98.8	
Informal votes		248	1.2	
Turnout		20,831	94.9	
Two-candidate-preferred result
Independent	Harold Coates	11,877	57.7	−0.5
Labor	James Collins	8,786	42.3	+0.5
Independent hold		Swing	−0.5	

=== Elections in the 1960s ===
==== 1968 ====
1968 New South Wales state election: Blue Mountains
Party	Candidate	Votes	%	±%
Independent	Harold Coates	9,991	56.1	+10.1
Labor	James Robson	7,118	40.5	−6.9
Democratic Labor	David Westgate	468	2.7	−3.9
Total formal votes		17,577	98.5	
Informal votes		272	1.5	
Turnout		17,849	95.6	
Two-candidate-preferred result
Independent	Harold Coates	10,247	58.3	+6.9
Labor	James Robson	7,330	41.7	−6.9
Independent win		(new seat)		
