= Trish Doyle =

Australian politician

Trish Doyle MP
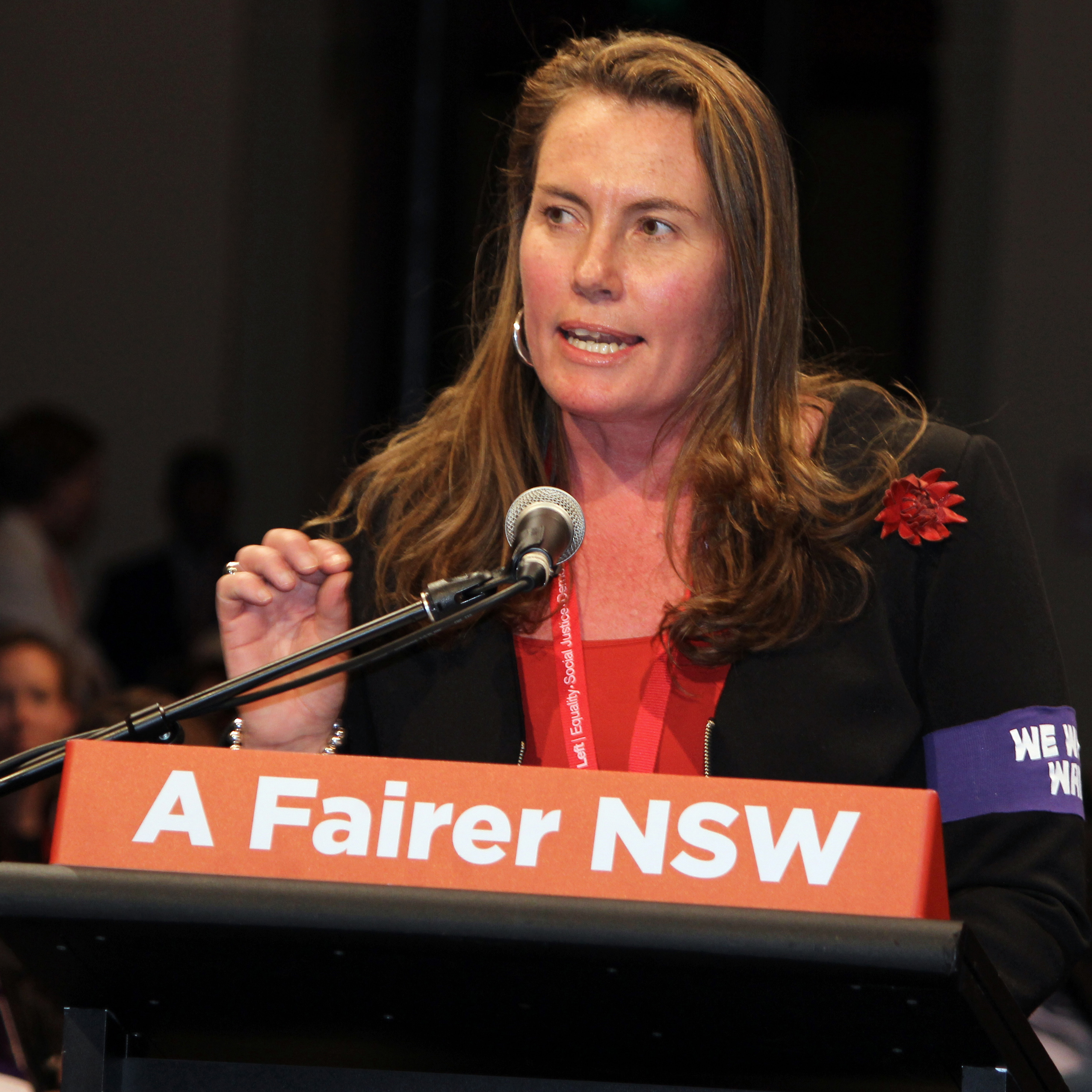

Member of the New South Wales Parliament for Blue Mountains
- Incumbent
- Assumed office 28 March 2015
- Preceded by: Roza Sage

Parliamentary secretary for Climate Change, Energy, the Environment and Heritage
- Incumbent
- Assumed office 26 April 2023
- Minister: Penny Sharpe

Personal details
- Party: Labor Party
- Alma mater: Macquarie University
- Occupation: Teacher
- Website: www.trishdoylemp.com.au

Trisha Lee Doyle is an Australian politician who was elected to the New South Wales Legislative Assembly as the member for Blue Mountains for the Labor Party at the 2015 New South Wales state election.

== Career ==
Doyle was a school teacher, and worked on the staff of Blue Mountains MP Phil Koperberg between 2007 and 2011. Doyle ran unsuccessfully as the Labor candidate in 2011 when the then incumbent Keneally Labor Government was swept from power. She was later preselected again ahead of the 2015 New South Wales state election as the Labor candidate. The boundaries of the Blue Mountains electorate were redistributed before the election, increasing the margin for the Liberal Party from 4.7 to 5.4 points.

At the 2015 election Doyle topped the first preference vote with 41.2%. There was a swing of 18.7 points toward her on first preferences. In the two-party-preferred distribution she beat sitting MP Roza Sage with 58.1% of the TPP vote, an increase of 13.5 points on the previous election. This was the first time in its history that the seat of Blue Mountains was not won by an MP from the party that would form government after that election, breaking the bellwether status of the electorate.

Doyle was sworn into the New South Wales Legislative Assembly on 5 May 2015 and made her inaugural speech to the House on 13 May 2015.

In November 2018, responding to allegations that the then NSW Labor leader, Luke Foley, had groped an ABC journalist in 2016, Doyle called on Mr Foley to resign his leadership by the end of the day and threatened to put a spill motion to the Labor caucus if he refused. He resigned an hour later.

At the New South Wales election in March 2019, Doyle was re-elected to her second four-year term with a two-party swing toward her of 6.7 points, giving her a final two-party result of 64.9%. This is the highest result achieved by a candidate in the Blue Mountains electorate since its establishment in 1968, besting the previous record holder, Labor's Bob Debus, who received 64.8% of the vote in 2003.

In the July 2019 leadership contest Doyle supported Jodi McKay against Chris Minns to lead NSW Labor. Doyle was promoted to the Shadow Ministry in July 2019 by McKay, being given responsibility for Emergency Services, Women and the Prevention of Domestic Violence. Doyle was not selected by Minns to continue in the Shadow Cabinet when the latter became NSW Labor leader in June 2021, and returned to the backbench. She was appointed as a Parliamentary secretary in 2023.

== Personal life ==
Doyle grew up in Canberra and the Riverina. As was revealed in her inaugural speech to the NSW Parliament, she grew up in public housing and a home rife with poverty and domestic violence. Doyle attended Macquarie University and graduated with a BA Dip Ed. She is married and lives with her husband Christopher in the upper Blue Mountains. She has two sons, Patrick and Tom. She is good friends with Federal MP Tanya Plibersek.

== Electoral history ==
Electoral history of Trish Doyle
Year	Electorate	Party	First Preference Result				Two Candidate Result			
Year	Electorate	Party	Votes	%	+%	Position	Votes	%	+%	Result
2011	Blue Mountains	Labor	10,253	22.7	▼18.1	2nd	17,144	45.3	▼15.8	Not Elected
2015	Blue Mountains	Labor	19,995	41.2	▲18.7	1st	25,866	58.1	▲13.5	Elected
2019	Blue Mountains	Labor	23,022	46.77	▲5.58	1st	28,834	64.86	▲6.71	Elected
2023	Blue Mountains	Labor	28,613	53.9	▲8.2	1st	35,536	71.9	▲8.3	Elected

2011 New South Wales state election: Blue Mountains
Party	Candidate	Votes	%	±%
Liberal	Roza Sage	17,681	39.1	+10.6
Labor	Trish Doyle	10,253	22.7	−18.1
Independent	Janet Mays	7,804	17.3	+17.3
Greens	Kerrin O'Grady	7,647	16.9	+0.7
Christian Democrats	Merv Cox	1,841	4.1	+4.1
Total formal votes		45,226	97.5	−0.4
Informal votes		1,141	2.5	+0.4
Turnout		46,367	94.0	
Two-party-preferred result
Liberal	Roza Sage	20,736	54.7	+15.8
Labor	Trish Doyle	17,144	45.3	−15.8
Liberal gain from Labor		Swing	+15.8	

2015 New South Wales state election: Blue Mountains
Party	Candidate	Votes	%	±%
Labor	Trish Doyle	19,995	41.2	+18.7
Liberal	Roza Sage	17,241	35.5	−4.1
Greens	Alandra Tasire	7,888	16.2	−0.7
Christian Democrats	Tony Piper	1,507	3.1	−1.1
Independent	Mark Harrison	1,470	3.0	+3.0
No Land Tax	Gianna Maiorana	450	0.9	+0.9
Total formal votes		48,551	97.5	+0.5
Informal votes		1,252	2.5	−0.5
Turnout		49,803	93.3	+0.7
Two-party-preferred result
Labor	Trish Doyle	25,866	58.1	+13.5
Liberal	Roza Sage	18,616	41.9	−13.5
Labor gain from Liberal		Swing	+13.5	

2019 New South Wales state election: Blue Mountains
Party	Candidate	Votes	%	±%
Labor	Trish Doyle	23,022	46.77	+5.58
Liberal	Owen Laffin	13,982	28.40	−7.11
Greens	Kingsley Liu	5,993	12.17	−4.07
Animal Justice	Gregory Keightley	2,008	4.08	+4.08
Christian Democrats	Cameron Phillips	1,786	3.63	+0.52
Sustainable Australia	Richard Marschall	1,496	3.04	+3.04
Keep Sydney Open	Mark Pigott	941	1.91	+1.91
Total formal votes		49,228	97.52	+0.04
Informal votes		1,250	2.48	−0.04
Turnout		50,478	91.97	−1.33
Two-party-preferred result
Labor	Trish Doyle	28,834	64.86	+6.71
Liberal	Owen Laffin	15,620	35.14	−6.71
Labor hold		Swing	+6.71	

New South Wales Legislative Assembly
Preceded by Roza Sage	Member for Blue Mountains; 2015–present	Incumbent
