= Susan Templeman =

Australian politician

Susan Templeman MP
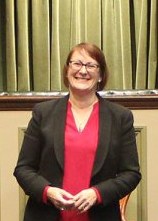

Member of the Australian Parliament for Macquarie
- Incumbent
- Assumed office 2 July 2016
- Preceded by: Louise Markus

Special Envoy for the Arts
- Incumbent
- Assumed office 31 May 2022
- Prime Minister: Anthony Albanese
- Preceded by: (position established)

Personal details
- Born: Susan Raye Templeman
- Party: Australian Labor Party
- Spouse: Ron Fuller
- Children: Two (a son and a daughter)
- Education: University of Technology Sydney
- Profession: Journalist (2UE, Austereo, LBC), Self-employed media trainer.
- Website: www.susantempleman.com.au

Susan Raye Templeman is an Australian politician. She is the member for Macquarie in the Australian House of Representatives and is Australia's Special Envoy for the Arts. She is a member of the Australian Labor Party and defeated the Liberal Louise Markus at the 2016 federal election. She was re-elected in 2019, 2022 and 2025. Templeman had previously run twice for the same seat, in 2010 and 2013.

At the 2016 election, Templeman defeated Louise Markus, winning the Division of Macquarie with a 6.7-point two-party preferred swing towards her. On primary votes, Templeman saw a 4.5-point swing towards her. Reasons for the increased support included her stance on issues such as opposition to the Western Sydney Airport and support for road infrastructure in the City of Hawkesbury, including a third bridge over the Hawkesbury River.

Templeman was re-elected in 2019 despite a 2.0-point two-party preferred swing against the Australian Labor Party in Macquarie. The result saw the seat become the most marginal federal seat in Australia, with just 371 votes separating the two major parties. Templeman was re-elected at the 2022 Australian federal election with a 7.7% swing. Following her re-election, she was appointed by Prime Minister Anthony Albanese as Special Envoy for the Arts. In the 2025 Australian Federal Election she was re-elected again with a 1.4% swing.

== Early life and education ==
Susan Raye Templeman grew up in Sydney. Her father, an accountant, and mother, a public school music teacher, were from the country. The family owned newsagencies in West Lindfield and Strathfield, with Templeman regularly working the morning paper run with her father. Templeman credits her upbringing in the newsagency for her becoming a journalist.

Templeman attended Killara High School and Strathfield Girls High School. She spent an additional six months of her secondary education at Colegio Mochis in Los Mochis, Sinaloa, Mexico as part of a year as a Rotary exchange student. Templeman stated that the exchange:

"Opened my eyes to the world and to the challenges of inequality and discrimination in a way my seven public schools had not."

Templeman graduated from the University of Technology, Sydney with a Bachelor of Arts in communications.

== Career ==
=== Journalist ===
Templeman began her career in January 1985, during the second Hawke term, as a journalist in the Canberra Press Gallery, at Old Parliament House. At the time she was the youngest permanent journalist in the press gallery. She covered the 1987 election campaign.

In 1988, Templeman and her husband moved to New York, and then London working as radio journalist foreign correspondents for both 2UE and Austereo. Templeman then became the News Editor for LBC, before moving back to Australia to work as the Media Relations officer for Telecom.

In 1991, Templeman became a media trainer, establishing Media Skills (which later became the company Templeman Consulting Pty Ltd). Templeman has been described as "one of Australia's most successful media trainers".

=== Political career ===
Templeman joined the Labor Party during John Howard's term in office. Describing her reasons for joining the Party, Templeman said:

"I could not sit by and see Australia becoming a backwards-looking and defensive society. Apparently, we no longer cared about being a republic or about Aboriginal reconciliation. We moved away from inclusion and we distanced ourselves from Asia. That was not the Australia I wanted for my children. So I joined the Labor Party, with no clear ambition other than to help get rid of John Howard. Not a bad one."

Templeman sought to be preselected as Labor's candidate for Macquarie at the 2010 federal election, and was the preferred candidate of the outgoing member, and former minister, Bob Debus. The preselection was marred with controversy, and required the intervention of the ALP's national executive, which ordered a rank-and-file preselection. Templeman, a member of the Socialist Left Faction, or hard left, of the ALP, was locked in a bitter battle with former Blue Mountains mayor, Adam Searle, a member of the Ferguson Left, or soft left. Searle was backed by the members of the soft left, members of the Labor Right faction and factional power broker Mark Arbib, but Templeman ultimately prevailed in the rank-and-file preselection, gaining 84 votes against the only other nominee, former policewoman Donna Ritchie.

At the 2010 election, Macquarie was the fourth most marginal Labor-held seat in the country. Templeman, who was touted as a "Western Sydney soccer mum", lost, with Labor suffering a 1.54-point two-party preferred swing, delivering the seat to former Member for Greenway and Liberal candidate for Macquarie, Louise Markus.

Templeman was pre-selected again in 2013, suffering a 3.32-point swing against her. She was pre-selected for a third time in 2016. At the 2016 election, Templeman defeated the incumbent Louise Markus, winning the Division of Macquarie with a 6.7-point two-party preferred swing towards her. On primary votes, Templeman saw a 4.5-point swing towards her, as well as the largest swing at an ordinary polling booth on Election Day in the country, where she recorded a 31.55-point swing in Kurrajong East

In the 45th Parliament, Templeman was appointed to the Joint Standing Committee on Treaties. Templeman is a member of the Joint Standing Committee on the Broadcasting of Parliamentary Proceedings, and the House of Representatives Standing Committee on Communications and the Arts. Following her re-election in 2019, Templeman was appointed as the Deputy Chair of the Joint Standing Committee on the National Broadband Network.

Templeman announced that she would seek preselection to recontest the seat of Macquarie in 2019 Australian federal election. Templeman was preselected unopposed.

In 2019, Templeman defeated Liberal candidate and Hawkesbury City Councillor Sarah Richards, with the vote so close that counting continued for 16 days before a result was announced. Despite a 2.0-point two-party preferred swing against Labor in Macquarie, Templeman saw a 2.75-point swing towards her in the primary vote. Templeman was returned to the seat with a margin of 0.38 points, or 371 votes making it the most marginal Federal seat in Australia.

Following her re-election in 2019, Templeman was appointed as the Deputy Chair of the Joint Standing Committee on the National Broadband Network, and the Standing Committee on Petitions. In 2021 she was named as a member of the House Select Committee on Mental Health and Suicide Prevention.

== Political views ==
Templeman is a supporter of marriage equality and LGBTIQ+ rights, and is a supporter of the Australian Republican Movement, citing the push for Australia to become a republic as one of the driving forces for her membership of the Australian Labor Party. She is a member of EMILY's List Australia, an organisation dedicated to the election of Labor women.

Following the closure of the Manus Island Detention Centre, Templeman declared opposition to Australia's system of offshore detention – a stance directly at odds with the platform of the Labor Party. Templeman has expressed similar opposition, contrary to party policy, to the Australian live export industry following the release of footage showing 2,400 live export sheep dying during the journey.

Templeman was the subject of media criticism for opposing the planned Western Sydney Airport. The proposed airport is a topic of debate within Templeman's electorate, with many residents opposed to the project for environmental and quality of life reasons.

In January 2018, Templeman and other community activists joined a lock-on protest at Windsor Bridge to stop the Roads & Maritime Services from beginning dig works at Thompson Square, the oldest public square in Australia. Templeman was forcibly and controversially removed from the protest by police, and was issued with two infringement notices for failing to move on from the protest site.

Templeman has been an advocate for the unilateral recognition of a Palestinian state, and has described Israeli settlements in the Palestinian Territories as imprisoning Palestinians. She was a critic of Australia's decision to vote against an independent inquiry into Israel's response to the 2018 Gaza border protests, and joined with other parliamentarians in signing a statement against Israel's treatment of Palestinian children in the military detention system. Templeman has been a supporter of the Australia Palestine Advocacy Network (APAN), and visited Palestine in November 2017 as part of a study tour sponsored by APAN.

Templeman has been an ongoing critic of the Trans-Pacific Partnership and its successor, the Comprehensive and Progressive Agreement for Trans-Pacific Partnership (or TPP-11). A member of the Joint Standing Committee on Treaties – the committee with principal oversight over the TPP and TPP-11 – Templeman was the first Labor MP to publicly criticise the Agreement during debate, raising significant concerns about the investor-state dispute settlement provisions, skills testing of foreign workers, the waiving of labour market testing and the lack of independent modelling as to the benefits of the agreement. She said that she would push for side letters with parties to the TPP-11 to be sought to remove the ISDS provisions.

== Personal life ==
Templeman lives in the Blue Mountains with her husband, Ron Fuller – the former Australian Broadcasting Corporation TV News Chief of Staff. In 2013, just two months after her defeat in the 2013 Australian Federal Election, Templeman's family home in Winmalee was destroyed in the 2013 Blue Mountains bushfires.

A former board director of Family Planning NSW and Sexual Health Australia, Templeman was the P&C president of her children's schools, Winmalee Public School and Winmalee High School.

Templeman and her husband are both members of the Media, Entertainment and Arts Alliance union.

== Electoral history ==
2025 Australian federal election: Macquarie
Party	Candidate	Votes	%	±%
Labor	Susan Templeman	46,773	42.64	+0.83
Liberal	Mike Creed	34,643	31.58	−4.31
Greens	Terry Morgan	13,666	12.46	+2.99
One Nation	Matthew Jacobson	9,587	8.74	+3.56
Family First	Roger Bowen	3,226	2.94	+2.94
Libertarian	Joaquim De Lima	1,810	1.65	+0.30
Total formal votes		109,705	95.84	+0.88
Informal votes		4,758	4.16	−0.88
Turnout		114,463	93.87	+1.78
Two-party-preferred result
Labor	Susan Templeman	63,306	57.71	+1.38
Liberal	Mike Creed	46,399	42.29	−1.38
Labor hold		Swing	+1.38	

2022 Australian federal election: Macquarie
Party	Candidate	Votes	%	±%
Labor	Susan Templeman	41,025	42.98	+4.71
Liberal	Sarah Richards	32,980	34.55	−10.30
Greens	Tony Hickey	9,115	9.55	+0.40
One Nation	Tony Pettitt	4,955	5.19	+5.19
United Australia	Nicole Evans	2,774	2.91	−1.09
Animal Justice	Greg Keightley	2,013	2.11	−1.61
Informed Medical Options	Michelle Palmer	1,318	1.38	+1.38
Liberal Democrats	James Jackson	1,272	1.33	+1.33
Total formal votes		95,452	94.93	−0.79
Informal votes		5,095	5.07	+0.79
Turnout		100,547	93.05	−0.77
Two-party-preferred result
Labor	Susan Templeman	55,143	57.77	+7.58
Liberal	Sarah Richards	40,309	42.23	−7.58
Labor hold		Swing	+7.58	

Alluvial diagram for preference flows in the seat of Macquarie in the 2022 federal election. indicates at what stage the winning candidate had over 50% of the votes and was declared the winner.

2019 Australian federal election: Macquarie
Party	Candidate	Votes	%	±%
Liberal	Sarah Richards	43,487	44.85	+6.64
Labor	Susan Templeman	37,106	38.27	+2.75
Greens	Kingsley Liu	8,870	9.15	−2.07
United Australia	Tony Pettitt	3,877	4.00	+4.00
Animal Justice	Greg Keightley	3,611	3.72	+0.93
Total formal votes		96,951	95.72	+2.25
Informal votes		4,338	4.28	−2.25
Turnout		101,289	93.82	+0.44
Two-party-preferred result
Labor	Susan Templeman	48,661	50.19	−2.00
Liberal	Sarah Richards	48,290	49.81	+2.00
Labor hold		Swing	−2.00	

2016 Australian federal election: Macquarie
Party	Candidate	Votes	%	±%
Liberal	Louise Markus	34,946	38.21	−9.15
Labor	Susan Templeman	32,480	35.52	+4.52
Greens	Terry Morgan	10,257	11.22	+0.12
Christian Democrats	Catherine Lincoln	3,567	3.90	+0.88
Shooters, Fishers, Farmers	Jake Grizelj	3,550	3.88	+3.88
Animal Justice	Hal Jon Ginges	2,554	2.79	+2.79
Liberty Alliance	Carl Halley	1,693	1.85	+1.85
Justice	Liz Cooper	1,653	1.81	+1.81
Liberal Democrats	Olya Shornikov	752	0.82	+0.82
Total formal votes		91,452	93.47	−0.90
Informal votes		6,389	6.53	+0.90
Turnout		97,841	93.38	−2.65
Two-party-preferred result
Labor	Susan Templeman	47,733	52.19	+6.67
Liberal	Louise Markus	43,719	47.81	−6.67
Labor gain from Liberal		Swing	+6.67	

2013 Australian federal election: Macquarie
Party	Candidate	Votes	%	±%
Liberal	Louise Markus	42,590	47.36	+2.89
Labor	Susan Templeman	27,872	31.00	−1.36
Greens	Danielle Wheeler	9,986	11.10	−2.99
Palmer United	Philip Maxwell	3,731	4.15	+4.15
Christian Democrats	Tony Piper	2,720	3.02	+0.87
Sex Party	Mark Littlejohn	1,776	1.98	+1.98
Australia First	Matt Hodgson	750	0.83	+0.06
Democratic Labour	Teresa Elaro	499	0.55	+0.55
Total formal votes		89,924	94.37	−0.15
Informal votes		5,362	5.63	+0.15
Turnout		95,286	94.63	−0.18
Two-party-preferred result
Liberal	Louise Markus	48,987	54.48	+3.22
Labor	Susan Templeman	40,937	45.52	−3.22
Liberal hold		Swing	+3.22	

2010 Australian federal election: Macquarie
Party	Candidate	Votes	%	±%
Liberal	Louise Markus	38,867	44.47	−0.23
Labor	Susan Templeman	28,284	32.36	−5.75
Greens	Carmel McCallum	12,317	14.09	+3.11
Liberal Democrats	Peter Whelan	2,087	2.39	+2.19
Christian Democrats	Luke Portelli	1,883	2.15	−0.10
Independent	Amy Bell	1,778	2.03	+2.03
Family First	Jason Cornelius	922	1.05	−0.02
Australia First	John Bates	676	0.77	+0.77
Carers Alliance	Terry Tremethick	591	0.68	+0.68
Total formal votes		87,405	94.52	−1.83
Informal votes		5,067	5.48	+1.83
Turnout		92,472	94.78	−1.13
Two-party-preferred result
Liberal	Louise Markus	44,801	51.26	+1.54
Labor	Susan Templeman	42,604	48.74	−1.54
Liberal gain from Labor		Swing	+1.54	

Parliament of Australia
Preceded by Louise Markus	Member for Macquarie; 2016–present	Incumbent
