= Division of Macquarie =

Australian federal electoral division

Coordinates: 33.475°S 150.642°E

Macquarie Australian House of Representatives Division
- Interactive map of electorate boundaries from the 2025 federal election
- Created: 1901
- MP: Susan Templeman
- Party: Labor
- Namesake: Lachlan Macquarie
- Electors: 121,999 (2025)
- Area: 4,387 km^{2} (1,693.8 sq mi)
- Demographic: Provincial
Electorates around Macquarie:
New England	Hunter	Hunter
Calare	Macquarie	Robertson; Berowra
Calare	Hume	Lindsay

The Division of Macquarie (/məˈkwɒriː/ mə-KWORR-ee) is an Australian electoral division in the state of New South Wales. The division was created in 1901 and was one of the original 65 divisions contested at the first federal election. It is named for Lachlan Macquarie, who was Governor of New South Wales between 1810 and 1821.

The division is located to the west of Sydney, and today it covers a large part of the Blue Mountains, as well as the Hawkesbury region on Sydney's western fringe.

The current Member for Macquarie, since the 2016 federal election, is Susan Templeman, a member of the Australian Labor Party.

In 2019, Macquarie was the most marginal seat in the country, held by a 0.19-point margin on the 2PP. However, in 2022 the Labor margin expanded to a comfortable 7.6 points.

== Geography ==
Macquarie is located on Sydney's western fringe. It covers all of the City of Blue Mountains and the City of Hawkesbury. It also includes the suburbs of the City of Penrith that lie west of the Nepean River (Emu Plains, Emu Heights and Leonay) and an uninhabited part of the Wollondilly Shire located in national parks.

Since 1984, federal electoral division boundaries in Australia have been determined at redistributions by a redistribution committee appointed by the Australian Electoral Commission. Redistributions occur for the boundaries of divisions in a particular state, and they occur every seven years, or sooner if a state's representation entitlement changes or when divisions of a state are malapportioned.

== History ==
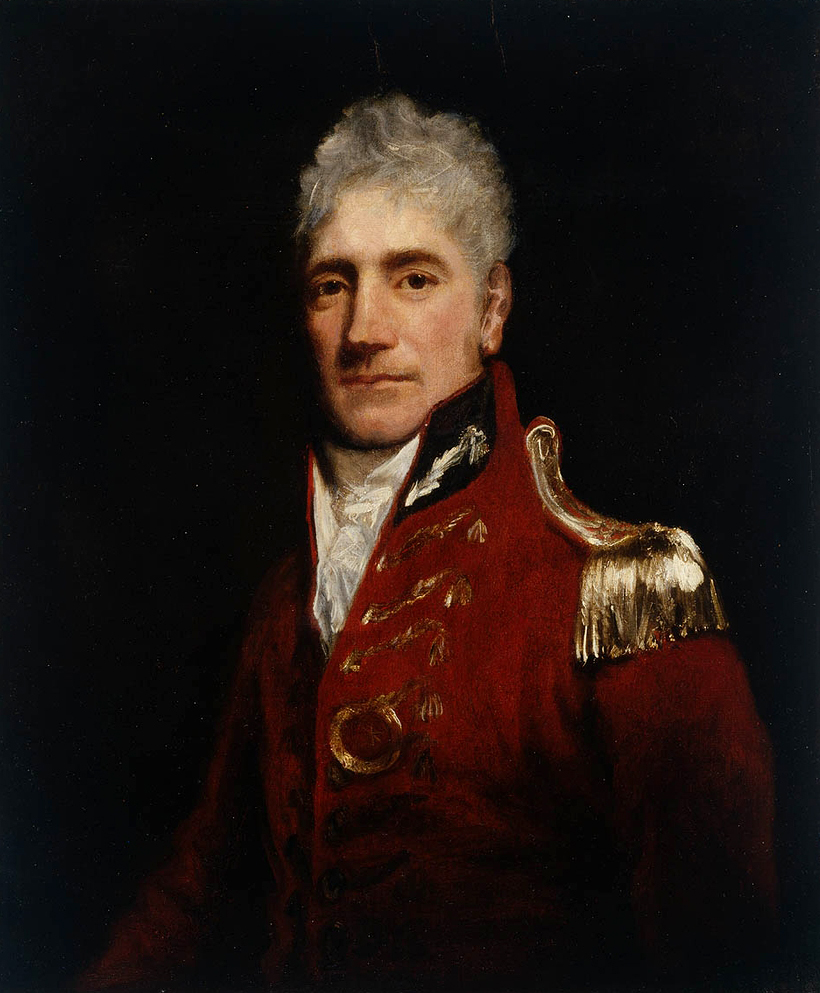
Lachlan Macquarie, the division's namesake

The most prominent former member is Ben Chifley, who was Prime Minister of Australia from 1945 to 1949, and was a member of the Australian Labor Party.

Voting patterns within the electorate vary significantly between the Blue Mountains and the Hawkesbury region. At the 2004 election, the two-party preferred vote favoured the Liberal candidate by more than 70:30 in the Hawkesbury region. The result was partially reversed in the Blue Mountains where the result was approximately 60:40, favouring the Labor candidate. This voting pattern was evident in the three previous federal elections up until 2007.

For most of the first seven decades after Federation, it was a hybrid urban-rural seat that stretched from the outer western suburbs of Sydney to the Central Tablelands, including Penrith and St Marys in Sydney and Bathurst, Lithgow, Portland and Oberon in the Central Tablelands. However, in 1977, the Central Tablelands were replaced by the Hawkesbury towns, and a 1984 redistribution carved the new seat of Lindsay out of much of its share of Sydney. In the same redistribution, Macquarie was significantly expanded northwards and westwards, though majority of the expanded area consisted of national parks.

The division has changed hands many times during its long history, but in elections previous to 2007 Kerry Bartlett consolidated his 1996 win to make the electorate a fairly safe Liberal seat.

On 13 September 2006, the Australian Electoral Commission announced that the seat was to be redistributed. The Hawkesbury towns moved to Greenway while Macquarie was pushed some distance into the Central Tablelands, as far west as Bathurst. The seat then contained the rural service and university town of Bathurst and the working-class towns of Lithgow, Portland and Oberon with the Blue Mountains. This not only restored the seat's connection with Chifley (a Bathurst native), but erased Bartlett's majority. While Bartlett had previously sat on a majority of eight percent, he now found himself in a seat with a notionally marginal Labor majority of 0.5 percent. Bartlett was defeated by former New South Wales Minister for the Environment and Attorney General Bob Debus, whose state seat of Blue Mountains covered much of the eastern portion of the seat, at the 2007 election on a 7.04 percent margin, turning it into a fairly safe Labor seat in a single election.

During the 2009 redistribution, however, Bathurst and Lithgow were shifted to Calare, restoring its pre-2007 boundaries. The redistribution nearly wiped out Labor's majority in the electorate, reducing it to an extremely marginal 0.3 percent. Debus retired before the 2010 election. Louise Markus, previously the Member for Greenway, reclaimed the seat for the Liberals in this election. She was ousted in the 2016 election by Labor's Susan Templeman.

== Members ==
Image	Member	Party	Term	Notes
	Sydney Smith (1856–1934)	Free Trade	29 March 1901 – 1906	Previously held the New South Wales Legislative Assembly seat of Canterbury. Served as minister under Reid. Lost seat
	Sydney Smith (1856–1934)	Anti-Socialist	1906 – 12 December 1906	Previously held the New South Wales Legislative Assembly seat of Canterbury. Served as minister under Reid. Lost seat
	Ernest Carr (1875–1956)	Labor	12 December 1906 – 14 November 1916	Lost seat. Later elected to the New South Wales Legislative Assembly seat of Cumberland in 1920
	Ernest Carr (1875–1956)	National Labor	14 November 1916 – 17 February 1917	Lost seat. Later elected to the New South Wales Legislative Assembly seat of Cumberland in 1920
	Ernest Carr (1875–1956)	Nationalist	17 February 1917 – 5 May 1917	Lost seat. Later elected to the New South Wales Legislative Assembly seat of Cumberland in 1920
	Samuel Nicholls (1885–1939)	Labor	5 May 1917 – 16 December 1922	Lost seat
	Arthur Manning (1872–1947)	Nationalist	16 December 1922 – 17 November 1928	Previously held the New South Wales Legislative Assembly seat of Albury. Served as Chief Government Whip in the House under Bruce. Lost seat
	Ben Chifley (1885–1951)	Labor	17 November 1928 – 19 December 1931	Served as minister under Scullin. Lost seat
	John Lawson (1897–1956)	United Australia	19 December 1931 – 21 September 1940	Served as minister under Menzies. Lost seat
	Ben Chifley (1885–1951)	Labor	21 September 1940 – 13 June 1951	Served as minister under Curtin and Forde. Served as Prime Minister from 1945 to 1949. Served as Opposition Leader from 1949 to 1951. Died in office
	Tony Luchetti (1904–1984)	Labor	28 July 1951 – 11 November 1975	Retired
	Reg Gillard (1920–2001)	Liberal	13 December 1975 – 18 October 1980	Lost seat
	Ross Free (1943–)	Labor	18 October 1980 – 1 December 1984	Transferred to the Division of Lindsay
	Alasdair Webster (1934–)	Liberal	1 December 1984 – 13 March 1993	Lost seat
	Maggie Deahm (1938–2015)	Labor	13 March 1993 – 2 March 1996	Lost seat
	Kerry Bartlett (1949–)	Liberal	2 March 1996 – 24 November 2007	Served as Chief Government Whip in the House under Howard. Lost seat
	Bob Debus (1943–)	Labor	24 November 2007 – 19 July 2010	Previously held the New South Wales Legislative Assembly seat of Blue Mountains. Served as minister under Rudd. Retired
	Louise Markus (1958–)	Liberal	21 August 2010 – 2 July 2016	Previously held the Division of Greenway. Lost seat
	Susan Templeman (1963–)	Labor	2 July 2016 – present	Incumbent

== Election results ==
2025 Australian federal election: Macquarie
Party	Candidate	Votes	%	±%
Labor	Susan Templeman	46,773	42.64	+0.83
Liberal	Mike Creed	34,643	31.58	−4.31
Greens	Terry Morgan	13,666	12.46	+2.99
One Nation	Matthew Jacobson	9,587	8.74	+3.56
Family First	Roger Bowen	3,226	2.94	+2.94
Libertarian	Joaquim De Lima	1,810	1.65	+0.30
Total formal votes		109,705	95.84	+0.88
Informal votes		4,758	4.16	−0.88
Turnout		114,463	93.87	+1.78
Two-party-preferred result
Labor	Susan Templeman	63,306	57.71	+1.38
Liberal	Mike Creed	46,399	42.29	−1.38
Labor hold		Swing	+1.38	

2022 Australian federal election: Macquarie
Party	Candidate	Votes	%	±%
Labor	Susan Templeman	41,025	42.98	+4.71
Liberal	Sarah Richards	32,980	34.55	−10.30
Greens	Tony Hickey	9,115	9.55	+0.40
One Nation	Tony Pettitt	4,955	5.19	+5.19
United Australia	Nicole Evans	2,774	2.91	−1.09
Animal Justice	Greg Keightley	2,013	2.11	−1.61
Informed Medical Options	Michelle Palmer	1,318	1.38	+1.38
Liberal Democrats	James Jackson	1,272	1.33	+1.33
Total formal votes		95,452	94.93	−0.79
Informal votes		5,095	5.07	+0.79
Turnout		100,547	93.05	−0.77
Two-party-preferred result
Labor	Susan Templeman	55,143	57.77	+7.58
Liberal	Sarah Richards	40,309	42.23	−7.58
Labor hold		Swing	+7.58	

Alluvial diagram for preference flows in the seat of Macquarie in the 2022 federal election. indicates at what stage the winning candidate had over 50% of the votes and was declared the winner.
