= Kerry Bartlett =

Australian politician (born 1949)

Member of the Australian Parliament for Macquarie
- In office 2 March 1996 – 24 November 2007
- Preceded by: Maggie Deahm
- Succeeded by: Bob Debus

Personal details
- Born: 15 April 1949 (age 77) Sydney, New South Wales
- Party: Liberal Party of Australia
- Education: University of Sydney; Macquarie University
- Occupation: Teacher

Kerry Joseph Bartlett (born 15 April 1949) is an Australian politician. He was a Liberal member of the Australian House of Representatives between March 1996 and November 2007, representing the Division of Macquarie, New South Wales. He was born in Sydney, New South Wales, and was educated at the University of Sydney and Macquarie University, and has a master's degree in economics from the latter. Before entering politics, he was a school economics and history teacher at Wycliffe Christian School, a university economics tutor and a financial planner.

Bartlett was Chief Government Whip from 2004 until 2007. His seat was radically altered ahead of the 2007 election. He had previously held the seat with a fairly safe majority of eight percent, but a redistribution wiped out Bartlett's majority and turned Macquarie into a marginal Labor seat. He was defeated by former Labor state minister Bob Debus on a swing of six percent.

Australian House of Representatives
Preceded by Maggie Deahm	Member for Macquarie; 1996–2007	Succeeded by Bob Debus
Preceded by Jim Lloyd	Chief Government Whip; 2004–2007	Succeeded by Roger Price
