= Alasdair Webster =

Australian politician

Alasdair Webster OAM

Member of the Australian Parliament for Macquarie
- In office 1 December 1984 – 13 March 1993
- Preceded by: Ross Free
- Succeeded by: Maggie Deahm

Personal details
- Born: 12 February 1934 (age 92) East Maitland, New South Wales
- Party: Liberal Party of Australia; Christian Democratic Party
- Children: 5
- Occupation: Politician, teacher, superintendent

Alasdair Paine Webster OAM (born 12 February 1934) is an Australian former politician.

== Early life ==
Webster was born in East Maitland, New South Wales. He underwent military service in 1953, attended the University of New England, and became a teacher.

From 1973 to 1984, Webster was chief superintendent of Daruk Boys' Home in Windsor, New South Wales.

== Politics ==
=== Federal politics ===
In 1984, Webster was elected to the Australian House of Representatives for the seat of Macquarie as a member of the Liberal Party. He held the seat until his defeat in 1993 by Maggie Deahm, representing the Australian Labor Party, who won by a margin of 105 votes.

Webster challenged the result in the Court of Disputed Returns. He made 22 allegations of irregularities, including widespread electoral fraud, and that an advertisement misled voters into thinking Deahm was a Democrat Candidate. Justice Mary Gaudron dismissed all but three of the allegations. The allegations that remained concerned allegations of multiple voting and impersonation. After the Electoral Commission had investigated the errors made in marking of the certified lists, Webster accepted that the additional marks were explicable as scanning errors. Justice Gaudron dismissed the petition, ordering that the Electoral Commission bear its own costs because of its own errors, but Webster was required to pay Deahm's costs.

=== Later activities ===
Webster subsequently joined the Call to Australia Party and unsuccessfully contested the Senate for them in 1996. He also contested the New South Wales Legislative Council for the Christian Democratic Party at the 1999 and 2003 state elections.

Webster was a delegate to the 1998 Australian Constitutional Convention, which met to discuss the issue of an Australian republic.

He was awarded the Medal of the Order of Australia on Australia Day 2008 for "services to the Parliament of Australia, and to the community, through Indigenous, educational and service organisations".

== Child sexual abuse charges ==
In 2018, 60 Minutes reported that during his time at Daruk Boys' Home, he had facilitated and wilfully ignored rampant child abuse, including child sexual abuse.

On 11 March 2020, it was revealed that Webster was facing historical sexual abuse charges dating back to his time as superintendent of the home. In May 2020, his application for a suppression order on the case was refused by the court.

Parliament of Australia
Preceded by Ross Free	Member for Macquarie; 1984–1993	Succeeded by Maggie Deahm
