= Roza Sage =

Australian politician

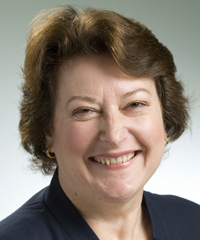

Member of the New South Wales Parliament for Blue Mountains
- In office 26 March 2011 – 6 March 2015
- Preceded by: Phil Koperberg
- Succeeded by: Trish Doyle

Personal details
- Born: 25 November 1957 (age 68)
- Party: Liberal Party
- Spouse: Ted Sage
- Education: University of Queensland
- Occupation: Politician
- Profession: Dentist

Roza Eva Maria Sage (born 25 November 1957), an Australian politician, was a member of the New South Wales Legislative Assembly representing the Blue Mountains for the Liberal Party from 2011 to 2015.

== Early years and background ==
Completing her undergraduate studies in dentistry at the University of Queensland, in 1979 Sage joined the Royal Australian Air Force and was initially posted to RAAF Richmond and later transferred to RAAF Glenbrook in the lower Blue Mountains in 1982. Sage left the armed forces in 1986 to start a family and later commenced working in a private dental practice, before starting her own practice in 1988. The practice, located in Springwood, now employs seven people.

== Political career ==
At the 2011 state election, Sage was elected with a swing of 16 points and won the seat with 54.7 per cent of the two-party vote. Following the retirement of the sitting member, Phil Koperberg. Sage is the first woman to represent the seat.

Sage was elected as a councillor on the Blue Mountains City Council at the December 2021 election.

New South Wales Legislative Assembly
Preceded by Phil Koperberg	Member for Blue Mountains; 2011–2015	Succeeded by Trish Doyle
