= Phil Koperberg =

Australian politician

The Honourable Phil Koperberg AO AFSM BEM

1st Commissioner of the NSW Rural Fire Service
- In office 1 September 1997 – 12 January 2007
- Preceded by: New title
- Succeeded by: Shane Fitzsimmons

Minister for Environment and Climate Change and Water
- In office 2 April 2007 – 27 February 2008
- Succeeded by: Verity Firth (Environment and Climate Change); Nathan Rees (Water)

Member of the New South Wales Parliament for Blue Mountains
- In office 24 March 2007 – 26 March 2011
- Preceded by: Bob Debus
- Succeeded by: Roza Sage

Personal details
- Born: 28 April 1943 (age 83) The Hague, The Netherlands
- Party: Labor Party

Philip Christian Koperberg AO AFSM BEM (born 28 April 1943), is the Chairman of the New South Wales Emergency Management Committee, responsible for advising the New South Wales government on emergency response strategies, since 2011.

Koperberg is a former Australian politician, was the New South Wales Minister for Climate Change, Environment and Water between 2007 and 2008; and was a member of the New South Wales Legislative Assembly, representing the electorate of the Blue Mountains for the Labor Party between 2007–2011. Prior to his political career, Koperberg was the Commissioner of the New South Wales Rural Fire Service (RFS) in Australia between 1997–2007.

"An expert in risk and crisis management, Phil Koperberg was the overall emergency controller during the 2001 Christmas/New Year fires, when Australia faced its longest and most intense bush firefighting campaign. In 1994 Phil Koperberg was also the overall emergency controller, as firefighters battled to control over 800 New South Wales fires covering in excess of 800,000 hectares. In 1999, his expertise was again called upon during the severe hail storms which damaged more than 30,000 properties."

In September 1997, Koperberg was appointed the RFS Commissioner when the Service was formed under the Rural Fires Act. Before this he had been Director-General of the New South Wales Bush Fire Service from May 1990. In March 2007 he was elected to State parliament and appointed to the Ministry. However, in December he was forced to stand aside due to a police investigation regarding domestic violence allegations from 1987. The NSW Director of Public Prosecutions declined to press charges and Koperberg was reinstated to the Ministry. He resigned from the Ministry on 22 February 2008. Koperberg did not recontest the 2011 state election.

== Background ==
Dutch-born Koperberg arrived in Australia in 1953 from Indonesia. Prior to his involvement in emergency management, he worked in various fields including the finance industry.

Koperberg fought his first bushfire as a teenager on the South Coast in 1959. He joined the North Springwood Bush Fire Brigade (now Winmalee Rural Fire Brigade) as a volunteer in 1967, working his way up to become captain of that brigade in 1969 and fire control officer for the Blue Mountains Fire Control Officer between 1970 and 1982. He held positions as the inaugural chair of the Fire Control Officer's Association, chairman of the Bush Fire Council of New South Wales and executive officer of the then Bush Fires Branch of the Office of the Minister for Police and Emergency Services.

== Commissioner of the New South Wales Rural Fire Service ==
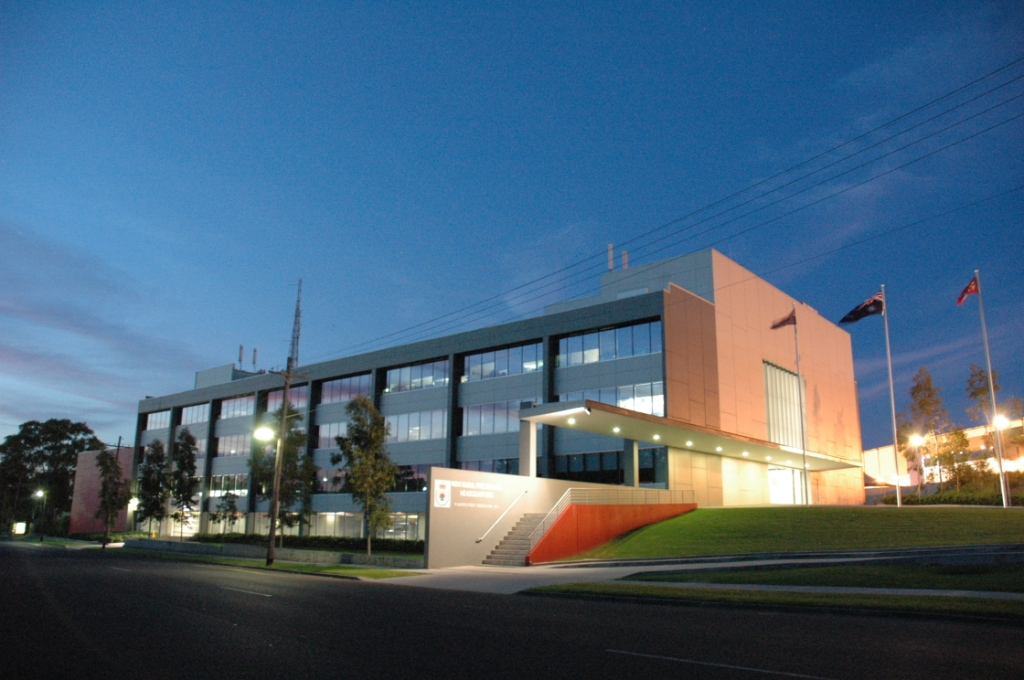
Koperberg was Commissioner at the time of the RFS occupying new headquarters in Carter Street, Lidcombe.

In 1985 Koperberg was appointed Chairman of the Bush Fire Council of New South Wales and Executive Officer of the Bushfires Branch of the Office of the Minister for Police and Emergency Services. In 1993 he became of Commissioner of Bush Fire Services. On 1 September 1997, following the proclamation of the Rural Fires Act 1997, Phil Koperberg was appointed to the position of Commissioner of the New South Wales Rural Fire Service.

In April 1999 when severe hail storms battered eastern Sydney causing damage to more than 30,000 properties Koperberg was appointed to operationally coordinate the emergency control / initial recovery effort. He continues to chair the Rural Fire Service Advisory Council, the Bush Fire Co-ordinating Committee and the State Rescue Board. He is a member and director of the Australasian Fire Authorities Council and a member of the Institute of Emergency Services.

Koperberg was Commissioner during the following major environmental events, most of which involved his professional skills:

- 1994 Eastern seaboard fires
- 1999 Sydney hailstorm
- 2001 Black Christmas/Warragamba bushfires
- 2003 Canberra bushfires
- 2006 Jail Break Inn bushfire
- 2006 Pulletop bushfire

=== Legal actions ===
In 2007 it was revealed on the Australian Broadcasting Corporation's Four Corners TV program that legal action was launched by residents in the Blue Mountains against the NSW Rural Fire Service, the local fire brigade, the National Parks and Wildlife Service and the Sydney Catchment Authority, as a result of damage caused by the 2001 Black Christmas/Warragamba bushfires. In separate action, a negligence claim was lodged in the ACT Supreme Court for damages against the NSW and Australian Capital Territory governments resulting from the 2003 Canberra bushfires. Koperberg was listed as a defendant in the Canberra bushfires legal proceedings in which the appellant claimed that he called the NSW Rural Fire Service Fire Control Centre 24 times over ten days, but was ignored. In hearings before the ACT Supreme Court, Koperberg admitted that at a meeting held in Queanbeyan he had understated the threat of the bushfires to Canberra's western suburbs.

== Political career ==
On 2 November 2006 Koperberg announced his intention to seek Labor Party preselection for the state seat of Blue Mountains in the New South Wales Legislative Assembly at the 2007 state election after Attorney-General and Environment Minister Bob Debus announced he would not recontest his safe Labor seat.

"The move comes despite denials as late as this week by Mr Koperberg that he had no plans to seek preselection in the seat which Labor holds by a 14.8 per cent margin. Mr Koperberg's years of high profile work fighting fires would make him a popular choice for the bushland electorate."

Almost immediately, it was revealed that Koperberg had been issued with an Apprehended Violence Order in 1987 after a domestic violence incident involving his wife of the time, Katherine Specking. On 6 November, Sydney radio personality Alan Jones made comment on air in response to these revelations:

"Look, can we end all this nonsense about Phil Koperberg. There's talk that there's an AVO taken out against him by his ex-wife and that someone's going to release that and put a dirt file together about Koperberg, et cetera et cetera. Politics has got to get rid of all of this stuff. And Morris Iemma and Peter Debnam have got to move heavily against anyone who tries it. Mr Koperberg's private life is just that, private. Any person who offers themselves to serve in public life deserves the support of the community. Mr Koperberg has done nothing illegal, he's broken no laws, he's confronted no court about anything that's happened in any of his marriages, I believe he's been married a couple of times. Who cares. Morris Iemma, to his credit, has backed Mr Koperberg. Look, no one's had more arguments with Phil Koperberg than I have. But it is absolutely sickening the way in which people's private lives are dragged through the sewers for the sake of some kind of public benefit. Mr Koperberg has ability. The electorate will decide whether it is enough to entitle him to a seat in the State Parliament. All the rest based on jealousy and hearsay ought to be left where it belongs, at the bottom of the garbage can."

— Alan Jones, on Radio 2GB, broadcast on 6 November 2006.

On 12 January 2007, Koperberg stood down from his role as RFS Commissioner in order to begin his campaign for political office. Official notification was sent (via e-mail) to RFS staff the following day announcing that Assistant Commissioner Robin Rogers AFSM had assumed the role of Acting Commissioner.

In the 2007 NSW election, he was elected to the seat of Blue Mountains. On 30 March, New South Wales Premier Morris Iemma announced Koperberg would be the Minister for Climate Change, Environment and Water. In the aftermath of the election, it was revealed that Koperberg's ex-wife Specking had been involved in an affair with Paul Gibson, the Member for Blacktown and as a result the two men were bitter rivals. Koperberg had in fact earlier suggested Gibson was behind the domestic violence allegations, accusing him of running a smear campaign "bordering on evil". However, Gibson was dumped from Cabinet almost immediately when he was accused of assault against an ex-lover, former Minister for Sport Sandra Nori, in 1991. Police later found Gibson had no case to answer.

On 2 December 2007, the claims regarding Koperberg's violence toward Specking re-emerged, this time with the additional implication that he had also assaulted his stepdaughter Paula Coad "with such force that one of her fillings was knocked out". Further claims were laid that the NSW Labor Party knew of the allegations before Koperberg's nomination for election and attempts were made to cover them up. Koperberg maintains he openly declared the allegations during the pre-selection process.

While Koperberg continues to deny any wrongdoing, he was stood down from the front bench of Parliament the following day while a police inquiry was instigated into the allegations, primarily due to pressure on Iemma to take action in light of the allegations against Gibson in March. On 9 January 2008, the police handed the results of their investigation into Koperberg to the NSW Director of Public Prosecutions. The Sydney Morning Herald reported that there was speculation Specking and Coad were not prepared to make statements to the police, making it likely Koperberg would be cleared. On 17 January the prospect of any charges being laid was dismissed.

Koperberg resigned from the New South Wales Ministry on 22 February 2008, citing ill health. But an unnamed source close to Koperberg, cited in The Sydney Morning Herald, said that the real reason for his resignation from the ministry was that he was fed up with continuing unsubstantiated allegations being promulgated by his party colleague, Blacktown MP, Paul Gibson. Verity Firth took over as Minister for Environment and Climate Change and Nathan Rees as Minister for Water.

Koperberg remained on the backbench as member for the Blue Mountains. On 8 October 2010, Koperberg announced that he will not seek Labor Party endorsement or re-election at the 2011 state election citing "bruising factional fighting" and internal party politics.

== Post-political career ==
Following the 2011 state election that was won by the O'Farrell–Stoner Liberal/National coalition, Koperberg was appointed as chairman of the State Emergency Management Committee. The committee is responsible for advising the NSW government on the state's emergency response strategies. In the wake of the 2013 New South Wales bushfires, the NSW Government appointed Koperberg to the position of Blue Mountains Bushfire Recovery Coordinator. Koperberg is also a member of the Emergency Leaders for Climate Action – a growing cohort of former senior Australian fire and emergency service leaders who have observed how Australia is experiencing increasingly catastrophic extreme weather events that are putting lives, properties and livelihoods at greater risk and overwhelming emergency services.

== Honours and awards ==
- British Empire Medal (Civil) for service to the community on 30 December 1978.
- National Medal for diligent long service to the community in hazardous circumstances, including in times of emergency and national disaster, in direct protection of life and property on 19 November 1990.
- Member of the Order of Australia (AM) for service to the community through co-ordinating and controlling the firefighting effort during the New South Wales bushfires of January 1994 on 10 June 1994
- Australian Fire Service Medal (AFSM) on 26 January 1995.
- Officer of the Order of Australia (AO) for outstanding service to the community through the development of an internationally recognised firefighting service, ensuring that training and equipment are of a high standard, and providing informed comment on hazard reduction and educating the community on bushfire safety on 9 June 2003.

Koperberg has also received the Pingat Ketua Pengarah Bomba from the Malaysian Fire Service.

Fire appointments
New title	Commissioner of the NSW Rural Fire Service; 1997 – 2007	Succeeded by Shane Fitzsimmons
New South Wales Legislative Assembly
Preceded by Bob Debus	Member for Blue Mountains; 2007 – 2011	Succeeded by Roza Sage
Political offices
Preceded by Bob Debus as Minister for the Environment	Minister for Environment, Climate Change and Water; 2007 – 2008	Succeeded by Verity Firth as Minister for Environment and Climate Change
Preceded by Bob Debus as Minister for the Environment	Minister for Environment, Climate Change and Water; 2007 – 2008	Succeeded by Nathan Rees as Minister for Water
