= Maggie Deahm =

Australian politician

Member of the Australian Parliament for Macquarie
- In office 13 March 1993 – 2 March 1996
- Preceded by: Alasdair Webster
- Succeeded by: Kerry Bartlett

Personal details
- Born: 31 October 1938 Sydney
- Died: 28 December 2015 (aged 77) Blue Mountains, New South Wales
- Party: Australian Labor Party
- Education: University of New England
- Occupation: Public servant, writer

Margaret Joan Deahm (31 October 1938 – 28 December 2015) was an Australian politician. She was an Australian Labor Party member of the House of Representatives for the Division of Macquarie from 1993 until her defeat at the 1996 general election.

Deahm was born at Hurstville, and studied arts at the University of New England. She was a public servant from 1966 to 1987, and a freelance writer, editor and consultant from 1987 to 1992. She was a City of Blue Mountains councillor from 1991 until 1993 when she was elected to federal parliament. She served as president and secretary of the Labor Party's Katoomba branch. She was also chair of the Western Sydney Regional Organisation of Councils and a member of the executive of the Local Government Women's Association from 1992 to 1993. She died in December 2015.

Parliament of Australia
Preceded by Alasdair Webster	Member of Macquarie; 1993–1996	Succeeded by Kerry Bartlett
