= Samuel Nicholls =

Australian politician

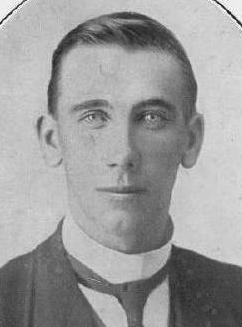

Member of the Australian Parliament for Macquarie
- In office 5 May 1917 – 16 December 1922
- Preceded by: Ernest Carr
- Succeeded by: Arthur Manning

Personal details
- Born: 15 May 1885 Mudgee, New South Wales
- Died: 26 September 1939 (aged 54)
- Party: Australian Labor Party
- Occupation: Clerk

Samuel Robert Nicholls (15 May 1885 – 26 September 1939) was an Australian politician. He was an Australian Labor Party member of the Australian House of Representatives from 1917 to 1922, representing the electorate of Macquarie.

Born in Mudgee, New South Wales, he was educated at public schools and became a clerk and cement worker. He was a trade unionist in the cement works at Portland for several years, serving as president of the Portland branch of the United Labourers Protective Society from 1910 and secretary of the Portland Cement Workers' Union from 1912.

In 1917, he defeated Ernest Carr, a Labor turned Nationalist MP, to win the Australian House of Representatives seat of Macquarie for Labor by nine votes. He refused to recruit for service during World War I, stating that he would not ask others to do what he was not prepared to do himself. One repeated concern of Nicholls in parliament was the fate of workers at the Lithgow Small Arms Factory. He held the seat until his unexpected defeat in 1922 by Nationalist Arthur Manning after a redistribution weakened his margin; he alleged irregularities with the result, but nothing further occurred.

Nicholls worked as an insurance agent after his political defeat. In October 1923, he was sued for not repaying a loan, and was declared bankrupt in February 1924, a situation which he attributed to having himself loaned money that had not been repaid. He was involved in a serious car crash in 1924 and was struck by lightning in 1926, but escaped with a "few bruises" and "severe shock" respectively. Nicholls nominated for Labor preselection at the 1925 federal election and 1927 state election; the first was rejected by the party as "not in order", and he was soundly defeated for the latter.

He died at Wagga Wagga Base Hospital in 1939 after a long illness, aged 54, and was buried in the Church of England portion of the Wagga Wagga Cemetery.

Parliament of Australia
Preceded by Ernest Carr	Member for Macquarie; 1917–1922	Succeeded by Arthur Manning
