= 2001 Warragamba bushfires =

Fires in December, 2001 in New South Wales, Australia

The 2001 Warragamba bushfires occurred Christmas Day, 25 December 2001 in the small New South Wales town of Warragamba, leaving 30 homes and businesses destroyed.

The bushfires in Warragamba were part of the longest official continuous bushfire emergency in NSW taking place between 21 December 2001 and 13 January 2002 and spreading across the state. Most of these fires were caused by lightning or arsonists. The fire behaviour was unusual in many areas due to extreme dryness of fuel and variable winds. The initial destruction in Warragamba and the Hawkesbury River area prompted a natural disaster declaration by the State Government.

On Christmas Day of 2001 over four thousand firefighters were battling over one hundred blazes across the state. A band of fire running from Campbelltown, New South Wales east to the coast was the firefighters main concern. This was the firefront that caused the damage to Warragamba and neighbouring town Silverdale, New South Wales as the fire sped sixty kilometres in six hours from the Lower Blue Mountains to the coast around Helensburgh, New South Wales. Areas further south, such as the area around St. George's Basin and Jervis Bay were heavily affected by fires caused by stray embers from the main front, with many homes in the area being destroyed.

Many local residents of the townships under threat battled the fires with garden hoses, as there were not enough fire-fighters. One resident, Father John Evans battled to save the local parish church, only to see his own house burn down.

Hundreds of people were forced into an emergency evacuation from Warragamba.

The initial loss of electricity affected 4,500 homes in Warragamba and surrounding areas. The local electricity supplier, Integral Energy estimated the cost in the Warragamba and surrounding areas at 3 million dollars.

On 26 December 2001, the day after the fires swept through the town, Prime Minister John Howard visited the town and praised the work of volunteer firefighters.
