= John Lawson (Australian politician) =

Australian politician

The Honourable John Lawson
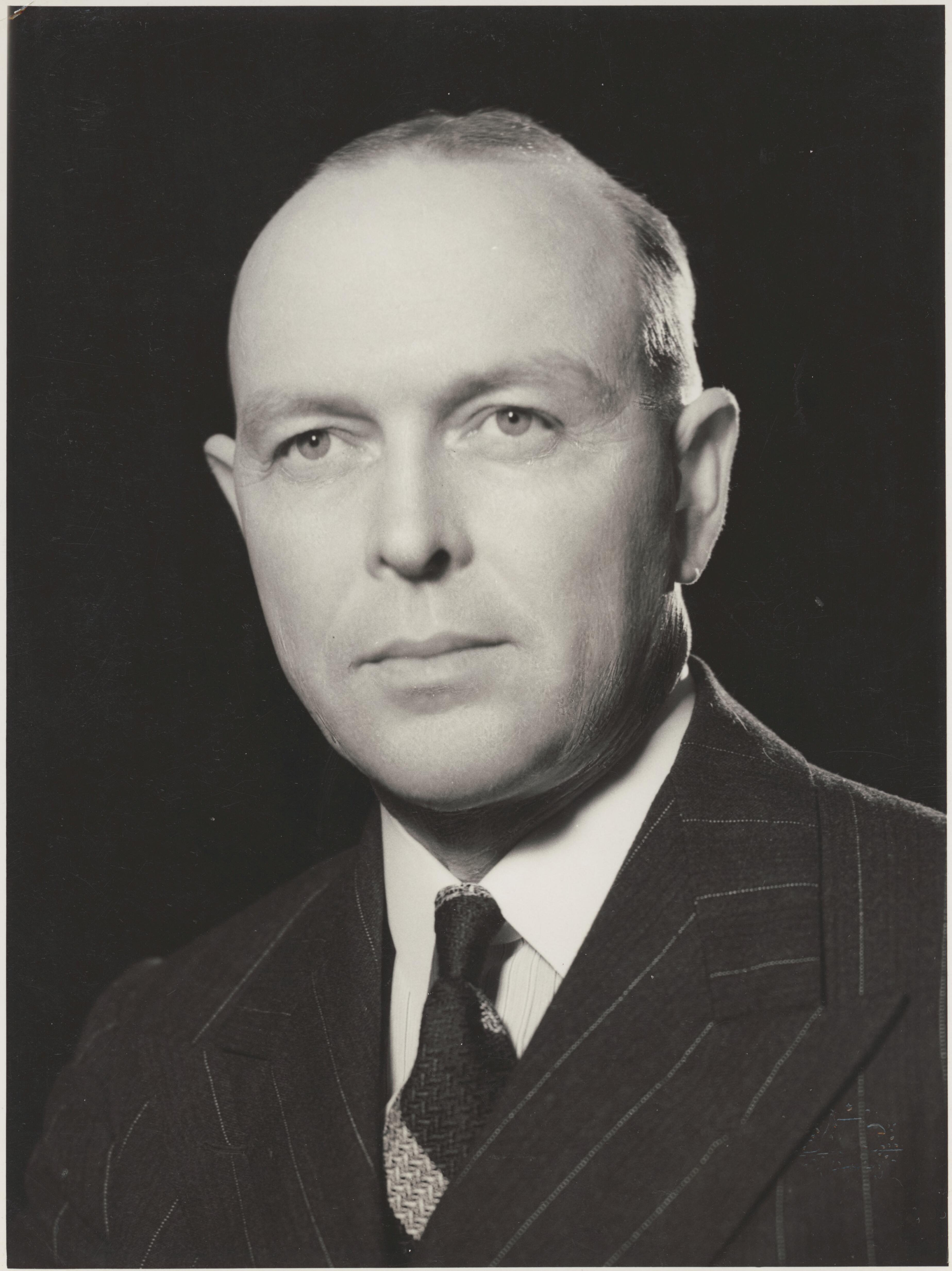

Minister for Trade and Customs
- In office 26 April 1939 – 23 February 1940
- Prime Minister: Robert Menzies
- Preceded by: John Perkins
- Succeeded by: George McLeay

Member of the Australian Parliament for Macquarie
- In office 19 December 1931 – 21 September 1940
- Preceded by: Ben Chifley
- Succeeded by: Ben Chifley

Personal details
- Born: 24 March 1897 Sydney, Australia
- Died: 14 August 1956 (aged 59) Singleton, New South Wales, Australia
- Party: United Australia Party
- Spouse: Jessie Orchard (m. 1925)
- Relations: Richard Orchard (father-in-law)
- Education: University of Sydney
- Occupation: Veterinarian

John Norman Lawson (24 March 1897 – 14 August 1956) was an Australian politician. He was a member of the United Australia Party (UAP) and served in federal parliament from 1931 to 1940, representing the Division of Macquarie in New South Wales. He was Minister for Trade and Customs in the first Menzies Government from 1939 to 1940.

== Early life ==
Lawson was born in Sydney on 24 March 1897. He was the son of Eleanor (née Day) and James Lawson; his father was a carrier.

Lawson attended Sydney Boys' High School, subsequently graduating Bachelor of Veterinary Science at the University of Sydney in 1920. He worked as a veterinarian in New Zealand until 1926, when he returned to Australia and acquired Kidgery, a small sheep station near Nyngan, New South Wales.

== Politics ==
In 1930, Lawson unsuccessfully stood as a Nationalist candidate for the seat of Cobar in an attempt to enter the New South Wales Legislative Assembly. He was later endorsed by the United Australia Party to contest the federal seat of Macquarie, held by Ben Chifley, the Labor Minister for Defence. In a surprising result, Lawson defeated Chifley by 456 votes, having been helped by the split of the Labor vote between Chifley and the Lang Labor candidate, Tony Luchetti.

Lawson was a vocal supporter of the proposal to establish a shale-oil undertaking at Newnes, near Lithgow, and in 1934 he increased his margin in Macquarie substantially. He was part of the delegation to the coronation of King George V, and was assistant to the treasurer Richard Casey and then the minister for industry Robert Menzies. When Menzies resigned in protest at Prime Minister Joseph Lyons' refusal to proceed with a scheme for national insurance, the loyal Lawson resigned his portfolios too. Upon Lyons' death in 1939, Menzies, as the new Prime Minister, was able to reward Lawson's devotion by appointing him minister for trade and customs.

Lawson was an important part of the World War II effort in Australia, and was appointed to the Economic Cabinet in 1939. He also attracted criticism from the Country Party, which had withdrawn from its alliance with the UAP, for negotiating a deal which gave Australian Consolidated Industries Ltd a virtual monopoly over the Australian motorcar industry. He embarrassed the ministry when it was revealed that he had leased a racehorse, and was reprimanded, but not sacked, by Menzies. Lawson, convinced that he had jeopardised the government, resigned anyway, on 23 February 1940. At the 1940 federal elections, he lost his seat to Chifley.

== Personal life ==
In 1925, Lawson married Jessie Orchard, the daughter of businessman and federal MP Richard Orchard. The couple had three children.

After leaving politics, Lawson managed Arrowfield, a stud farm at Jerrys Plains, New South Wales. He died of a heart attack on 14 August 1956, aged 59.

Political offices
Preceded by John Perkins	Trade and Customs; 1939–1940	Succeeded by Robert Menzies
Parliament of Australia
Preceded by Ben Chifley	Member for Macquarie; 1931–1940	Succeeded by Ben Chifley
