= Louise Markus =

Australian politician

Member of the Australian Parliament for Macquarie
- In office 21 August 2010 – 2 July 2016
- Preceded by: Bob Debus
- Succeeded by: Susan Templeman

Member of the Australian Parliament for Greenway
- In office 9 October 2004 – 21 August 2010
- Preceded by: Frank Mossfield
- Succeeded by: Michelle Rowland

Personal details
- Born: 6 September 1958 (age 68) Epping, Sydney Australia
- Party: Liberal Party of Australia
- Spouse: Jim Markus
- Children: 2
- Education: University of New South Wales
- Profession: Social worker
- Website: www.louisemarkus.com.au

Louise Elizabeth Markus (born 6 September 1958) is a former Australian politician who served as a member of the Australian House of Representatives, initially elected to represent the seat of Greenway in western Sydney for the Liberal Party of Australia at the 2004 federal election. Following an unfavourable redistribution in 2010, she moved to the seat of Macquarie. She lost the 2016 federal election to Labor's Susan Templeman.

== Early years and background ==
She was educated at the University of New South Wales, graduating in social work, and was a community worker running the Hillsong Church's drug and alcohol outreach service in Blacktown prior to entering politics.

== Political career ==
Subsequent to the 2004 election, unsubstantiated allegations were made in the NSW Parliament under parliamentary privilege that Markus had directly benefited from unauthorised campaign materials containing false statements in an attempt to capture anti-Islamic sentiment against her Labor opponent. These allegations were not supported as the basis for his loss by the Labor candidate nor supported by contemporary media coverage.

At the 2007 federal election, Markus retained the seat of Greenway with a comfortable margin, although with a nominal swing of 6.85 points against her on a two-party-preferred basis. Following the election, Markus was appointed as the Shadow Parliamentary Secretary for Immigration and Citizenship, but did not retain the position in a 2010 reorganisation of the shadow ministry. She was previously the Shadow Minister for Veteran's Affairs.

A September 2006 redistribution of boundaries saw massive changes in the shape of her electorate of Greenway. The northward shift in electorate boundaries also saw Greenway change from marginal Liberal to safe Liberal. A further electoral redistribution in 2009 made the seat of Greenway notionally Labor on an estimated margin of 5.7%. Markus contested the 2010 federal election as the Liberal candidate for the seat of Macquarie, which had absorbed a fraction of her former electorate base. Markus won the two-party-preferred vote by 2.52 points against Labor, with most support in her traditional base in the urban east of the electorate, and high Greens votes in the smaller upper Blue Mountains booths. The 2013 federal election was marked by widespread swings towards the Liberal Party in western Sydney. In this context, Markus further extended her margin, winning with a primary vote of 47.4% and a two-party-preferred vote of 54.5%. As before, the electorate demonstrated a marked polarity, with her support being in the more urban northern and eastern portions of the electorate.

At the 2016 federal election, the incumbent Markus lost the seat of Macquarie to three-time challenger, Susan Templeman. Activist group GetUp! claimed to have played a significant role in the outcome as they targeted Markus in a direct electoral campaign. This included the distribution of how to vote material favouring Green and Labor candidates.

== Personal ==
Markus lives in Riverstone. She is married to Jim Markus, who is from Papua New Guinea; together they have two children.

Parliament of Australia
Preceded by Frank Mossfield	Member for Greenway; 2004–2010	Succeeded by Michelle Rowland
Preceded by Bob Debus	Member for Macquarie; 2010–2016	Succeeded by Susan Templeman
