= Barry Morris =

Australian politician (1935–2001)

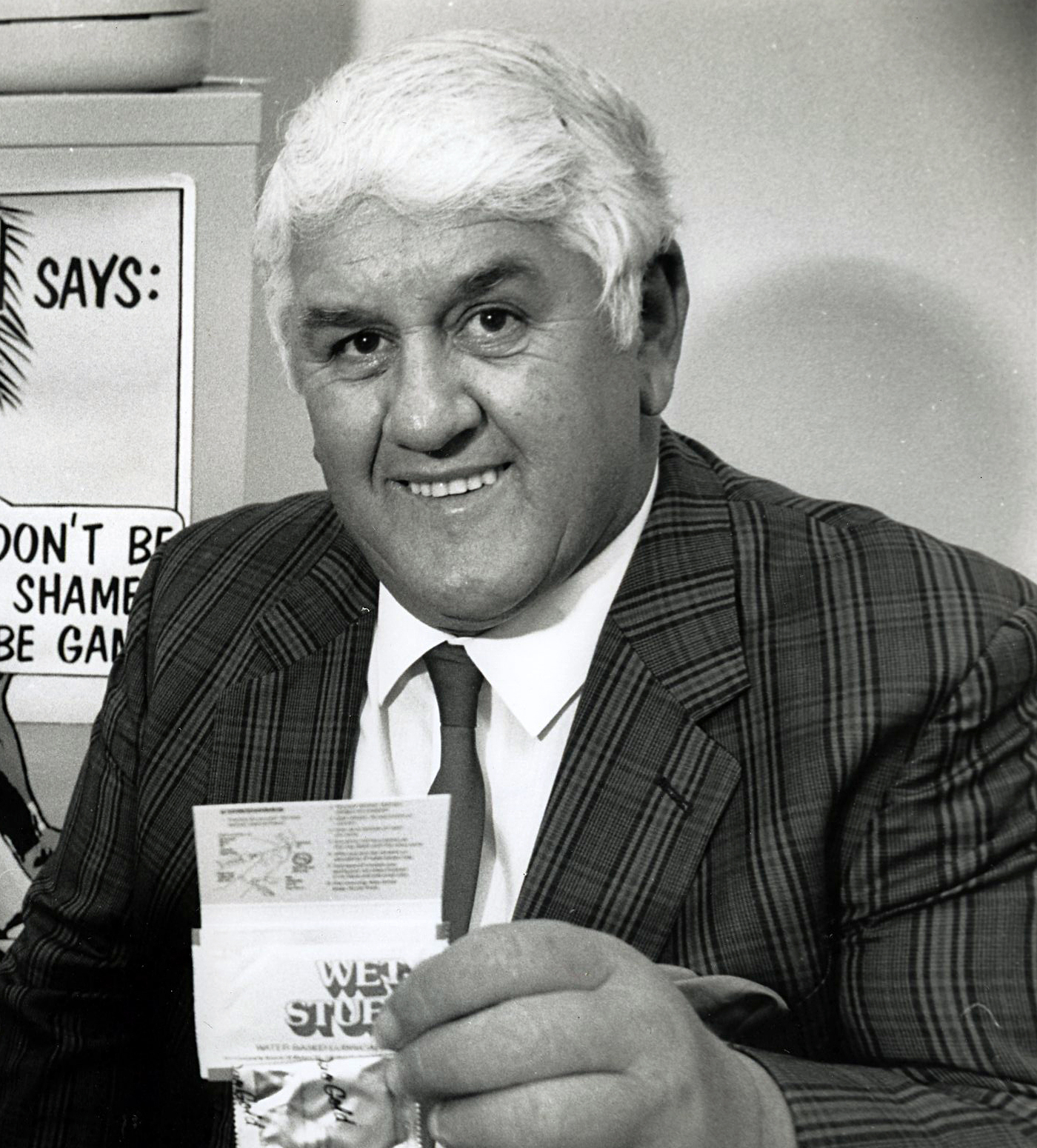
- Barry Morris in 1991
- Born: 20 April 1935; Lithgow, New South Wales, Australia
- Died: 19 May 2001 (aged 66)
- Occupation: Politician
- Criminal charges: Making bomb threats and death threats

Barry Morris (20 April 1935 – 19 May 2001) was an Australian politician, who in 1995 was jailed for making bomb and death threats. The incident was considered a key factor in the Labor Party being returned to power in New South Wales after seven years in Opposition.

== Career ==
Born in Lithgow in 1935, Morris initially followed family tradition and entered the rural industries of fruit and grazing, before finding success as owner of an oil company, Morris Petroleum, and as a property developer. The latter earned him the nickname 'The King of Little Hartley', given his interest in developing the small Blue Mountains village in which he then lived. He was elected as a member of the New South Wales Legislative Assembly for the seat of Blue Mountains in 1988, as the candidate for the Liberal Party, defeating the Labor incumbent, Bob Debus.

== Scandal ==
=== John Pascoe and Blue Mountains City Council ===
The already poor relations between Morris and some members of Blue Mountains City Council further deteriorated when the idea of supporting increased truck freight passage through the area met with their stiff opposition and accusations of a conflict of interest – particularly from John Pascoe, a councillor and vocal environmental activist. Already Pascoe had clashed with Morris on numerous issues, from the fluoridation of the local water supply (Pascoe opposed this) to the planned sale of the historic Sorensen's Nursery at Leura. Pascoe alleged that pro-development advocates such as Morris were a serious threat to the natural heritage of the world-famous Blue Mountains area.

=== Blue Mountains Council bombing ===
On 3 March 1992, a bomb ripped through the chambers of the Blue Mountains City Council during a council meeting. Though nobody was injured, the blast was powerful enough to break downstairs windows, dislodge brickwork, and send shrapnel throughout the building. Police suggested that the culprit was a resident motivated by controversy over local development issues, but were unable to charge a suspect, and the case was dropped.

On the evening of 16 June 1993, a phone threat was made to the offices of a local paper, the Blue Mountains Gazette, by a man disguising his voice with an Italian accent. The caller warned that he was planning another bombing, designed to kill John Pascoe. A tape of the message was passed on to the Labor Party by an unknown source, allowing the Opposition Leader, Bob Carr, to bring the matter to wide attention via a Question on Notice asked on 12 April 1994, suggesting Morris was responsible for the call and may have played some part in the Blue Mountains Council bombing.

=== Questioning and resignation ===
The Opposition embarked on several tumultuous weeks of questioning, during which it was revealed that John Pascoe had previously received a number of death threats throughout 1990 and 1991. It was also alleged that another Blue Mountains councillor, Carol Gaul, had attempted to report a phoned threat several days following the bombing, but the report was not followed up.

On 11 May 1994, Morris was charged with four counts of making a statement causing a person to fear for his safety and four counts of using a telephone to menace a person, for calls that took place on 29 June 1990, 14 October 1991, 16 June 1993 and 15 April 1994. One further charge was laid for the call on 16 June 1993, for making a statement causing the Blue Mountains Council to fear for their safety.

Morris resigned from Parliament on 14 December 1994. Under pressure from Premier John Fahey, he also gave up his membership of the Liberal Party. As a State election was due to take place in a matter of months, it was decided that no by-election would be held for his replacement.

== Aftermath ==
Despite the fact that he was still facing criminal charges, Morris ran as an independent in the 1995 election, gaining 18% of the primary vote. Blue Mountains was always considered a marginal seat, and the Labor Party's success in winning it had been an indispensable factor, 19 years before, in the election of the Wran Government in 1976. That was again the case in 1995, with the seat returning to its previous member, Bob Debus, and the Liberal Party narrowly losing government to Labor.

Morris was sentenced to two years in prison, although this sentence was later reduced to one year on appeal. He served his time at Berrima Training Centre. Embittered by his experiences, he contributed to small publications, and began to self-publish a vituperative newsletter, named Berrima Murmurs, which criticised many of his former colleagues in the Liberal Party. He died in Sydney in 2001. No one was charged over the bombing of Blue Mountains Council, and the crime officially remains unsolved.

New South Wales Legislative Assembly
| Preceded by Bob Debus | Member for Blue Mountains; 1988–1995 | Succeeded by Bob Debus |
