= Tony Luchetti =

Australian politician (1904–1984)

Tony Luchetti AM
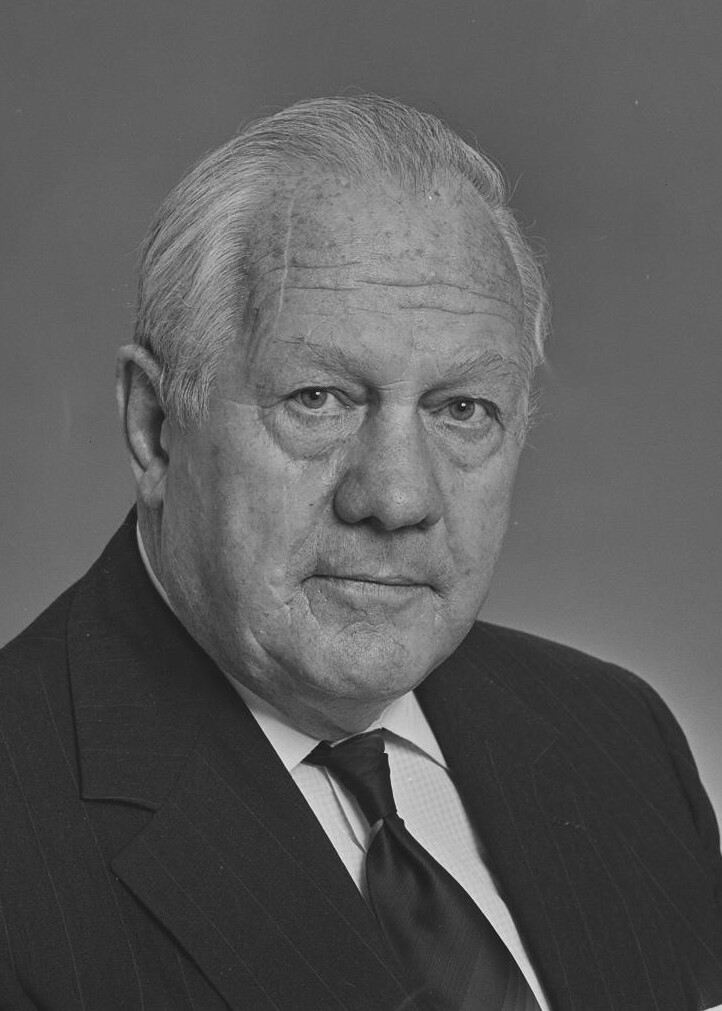
- Luchetti in 1973

Member of the Australian Parliament for Macquarie
- In office 28 July 1951 – 11 November 1975
- Preceded by: Ben Chifley
- Succeeded by: Reg Gillard

Personal details
- Born: 27 May 1904 Lowther, New South Wales, Australia
- Died: 11 July 1984 (aged 80) Lithgow, New South Wales, Australia
- Party: Labor
- Other political affiliations: Lang Labor (1930s)
- Spouse: Beatrice Titus (m. 1939)
- Occupation: Miner, journalist

Anthony Sylvester Luchetti (27 May 1904 – 11 July 1984) was a long serving Australian federal member of parliament.

Born of Italian/Irish parentage in Lowther, New South Wales, Luchetti was educated in the Catholic school system before working in jobs as varied as miner and journalist. Involved in the Australian Labor Party (ALP) from an early age, Luchetti was elected to the Lithgow City Council and served on the New South Wales ALP Executive from 1929 to 1931.

Luchetti developed a close friendship with the local federal Member of Parliament and future prime minister Ben Chifley, and also served as Chifley's campaign manager for the electoral Division of Macquarie for two elections. However, following a split in the New South Wales Labor ranks led by New South Wales premier Jack Lang, Luchetti, a Lang supporter, stood against Chifley. The Labor vote split between the two candidates, enabling the opposition United Australia Party candidate, John Lawson, to win the seat. The two would remain on less than cordial terms for the rest of Chifley's life. Luchetti remained active in the Labor movement, however, and following the death of Chifley in 1951, Luchetti won Labor pre-selection for the Macquarie electorate and the subsequent by-election and served as the member for Macquarie until his retirement in 1975.

== Early life ==
Luchetti was born on 27 May 1904 in Lowther, New South Wales. He was the son of Edith Maud née Hutchison and Alexander Luchetti; his father was a coal miner. His paternal grandfather Alessandro Luchetti was born in Ancona, Italy, and his paternal grandmother Sarah Jennings was born in County Mayo, Ireland.

Luchetti was educated at public and Catholic schools in Newnes and Lithgow. He left school at the age of 15 and worked various jobs, including tinning petrol, as a boilermaker's mate, and as a blacksmith's striker. He was also a well-known local boxer and rugby league player. After his father's death in 1922, Luchetti became his family's primary breadwinner. He worked at a brickworks at Vale of Clwydd and also at the State Coal Mine at Lithgow.

== Labour movement and early political involvement ==
Luchetti followed his father into the labour movement and was elected president of the Lithgow branch of the Brick, Tile and Pottery Industrial Union in 1923. He joined the Australian Labor Party in the same year.

Luchetti served on the Lithgow City Council from 1941 to 1952, including as mayor in 1942 and 1950.

== Federal parliament ==
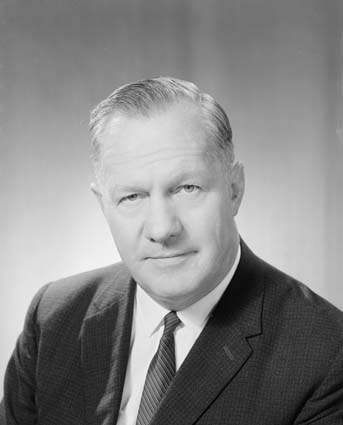
Luchetti in 1962

Luchetti was elected to the House of Representatives at the 1951 Macquarie by-election, caused by the death of former ALP prime minister Ben Chifley. He was re-elected on nine occasions and retired prior to the 1975 federal election.

== Personal life ==
In 1939, Luchetti married Beatrice Titus, with whom he had three children. Outside of politics he owned a cattle run near Wallerawang, New South Wales.

Luchetti died in Lithgow on 11 July 1984, aged 80.

Parliament of Australia
Preceded by Ben Chifley	Member for Macquarie; 1951–1975	Succeeded by Reg Gillard
