= Arthur Manning =

Australian politician

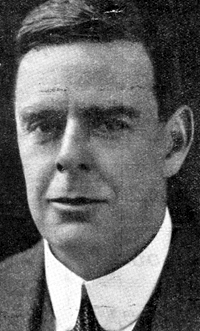

Member of the Australian House of Representatives
- In office 16 December 1922 – 17 November 1928
- Preceded by: Samuel Nicholls
- Succeeded by: Ben Chifley
- Constituency: Macquarie

Member of the New South Wales Legislative Assembly
- In office 24 March 1917 – 20 March 1920
- Preceded by: John Cusack
- Succeeded by: Seat Abolished
- Constituency: Albury

Personal details
- Born: 1 January 1872 Wagga Wagga, New South Wales, Australia
- Died: 3 April 1947 (aged 75) Sydney, Australia
- Party: Nationalist
- Spouse: Florence Hogarth (m. 1899)
- Occupation: Grazier

Arthur Gibson Manning (1 January 1872 – 3 April 1947) was an Australian politician who served in the House of Representatives from 1922 to 1928, representing the Division of Macquarie for the Nationalist Party. He was previous a member of the New South Wales Legislative Assembly from 1917 to 1920.

== Early life ==
Manning was born in Wagga Wagga, New South Wales, to pastoralists Frederick and Jane Belle Manning. He was educated in public schools in Wagga and Yass before purchasing grazing land in Narrabri and West Wyalong; he married Florence Hogarth in 1899, a union which produced no children. He became a vocal proponent for the rights of farmers, serving as president of the Australian Meat Council and on the boards of the Farmers and Settlers' Association and the Graziers' Association.

== Member of parliament ==
At the 1917 state election, Manning won the seat of Albury for the Nationalist Party. Defeated at the 1920 state election, Manning remained involved in the Nationalist Party and rural affairs and was chosen as the Nationalist candidate for the Division of Macquarie at the 1922 federal election. Manning was victorious, narrowly defeating sitting Labor representative Samuel Nicholls by less than 100 votes after preferences from an independent were distributed.

Manning faced controversy during his first term in federal parliament when it was revealed in 1924 that he and fellow parliamentarian farmer William Killen had signed cheques on behalf of the government to the Australian meat industry (in which they both had interests). This was considered by some to be in breach of section 44(v) of the Australian constitution, whereby members of parliament were banned from deriving a benefit from government actions. Following a lively parliamentary debate, a motion that Manning and Killen were in breach of section 44(v) was defeated.

Despite the controversy, Manning retained his seat at the 1925 election, defeating Labor candidate and future prime minister Ben Chifley. In 1926, Manning was a member of the Australian delegation to the League of Nations General Assembly, discussing, among other issues, Australia's administration of the former German New Guinea.

Manning was opposed by Chifley again in 1928, and narrowly lost following a Labor campaign that painted Manning a friend of Asian immigrants. Chifley argued that he would help keep Australia white and while Manning used his campaign speeches to deny that he was in favour of Asian immigration, the electorate was in no mood for someone they considered soft on immigration.

== Later life ==
Out of parliament, Manning remained on the executive of the Nationalist Party and stood as the official Nationalist Party candidate for the suburban Sydney federal Division of Wentworth at the 1929 election, following the expulsion of the sitting member Walter Marks from the party. Manning lost and returned to his life as a gentleman grazier while remaining involved in farming and political issues, including a stint as a United Australia Party (the successor to the Nationalist Party) councillor from 1933 to 1935. He died in Sydney.

New South Wales Legislative Assembly
Preceded by John Cusack	Member for Albury; 1917–1920	Succeeded by Abolished
Parliament of Australia
Preceded by Samuel Nicholls	Member for Macquarie; 1922–1928	Succeeded by Ben Chifley
