= 1951 Macquarie by-election =

| 28 July 1951 |
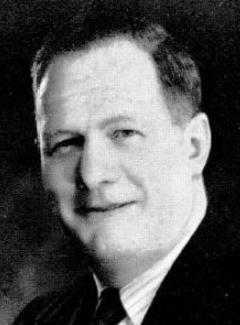
| | First party | Second party | Third party |
|---|---|---|---|
| | | LIB | IND |
| Candidate | Tony Luchetti | William Hannam | William Blanchard |
| Party | Labor | Liberal | Independent Labor |
| Popular vote | 18,426 | 12,356 | 3,853 |
| Percentage | 52.3% | 35.1% | 10.9% |
| Swing | ▼9.5pp | ▼3.1pp | ▲10.9pp |
MP before election
Ben Chifley
Labor
Elected MP
Tony Luchetti
Labor

The 1951 by-election for the Australian House of Representatives seat of Macquarie was held on 28 July after the death of the incumbent Australian Labor Party member, former Prime Minister Ben Chifley, who died on 14 June after suffering a heart attack. Chifley's death came less than three months after the 1951 general election.

== Candidates ==
Contesting the seat for the Labor Party was Tony Luchetti, who had been the Lang Labor candidate in Macquarie in 1931 and 1934, his preferences defeating Chifley in 1931. William Blanchard ran as an independent Labor candidate in protest at Luchetti's selection as Chifley's successor.

Their main opponent was William Hannam of the Liberal Party of Australia. Vernon Moffitt, representing the Communist Party of Australia, also ran.

== Results ==
Macquarie by-election, 1951
| Party | Candidate | Votes | % | ±% |
|---|---|---|---|---|
| Labor | Tony Luchetti | 18,426 | 52.3 | −9.5 |
| Liberal | William Hannam | 12,356 | 35.1 | −3.1 |
| Independent Labor | William Blanchard | 3,853 | 10.9 | +10.9 |
| Communist | Vernon Moffitt | 575 | 1.6 | +1.6 |
| Total formal votes | | 35,210 | 99.1 | |
| Informal votes | | 325 | 0.9 | |
| Turnout | | 35,535 | 90.5 | |

== Aftermath ==
At the following 1954 general election Luchetti retained the seat and was the sole Labor candidate.

== See also ==
- List of Australian federal by-elections
