= Reg Gillard =

Australian politician

Reg Gillard OAM

Member of the Australian Parliament for Macquarie
- In office 13 December 1975 – 18 October 1980
- Preceded by: Tony Luchetti
- Succeeded by: Ross Free

Personal details
- Born: 13 March 1920 Lithgow, New South Wales
- Died: 16 August 2001 (aged 81) Lithgow
- Party: Liberal Party of Australia
- Spouse: Irene
- Children: David, Robyn, Louise and Craig
- Occupation: Managing partner

Reginald Gillard (13 March 1920 – 16 August 2001) was an Australian politician. Born in Lithgow, New South Wales, he was a managing partner before his military service (1941–1946). Long prominent in local politics, he served as mayor of Lithgow City Council from 1969 to 1972, and again from 1973 to 1976.

In 1975, he was elected to the Australian House of Representatives as the Liberal member for Macquarie. He held the seat until his defeat at the 1980 election by Labor's Ross Free.

Gillard was awarded the Medal of the Order of Australia (OAM) in the 1998 Australia Day Honours for "service to local government, the community and the Australian parliament". In September 2000 he received the Australian Sports Medal for his "service to administration of lawn bowls".

Gillard died in 2001. He was not related to Julia Gillard, the former prime minister of Australia.

Parliament of Australia
Preceded by Tony Luchetti	Member for Macquarie; 1975–1980	Succeeded by Ross Free
