= Electoral district of Blue Mountains =

State electoral district of New South Wales, Australia

Blue Mountains New South Wales—Legislative Assembly
- Interactive map of district boundaries from the 2023 state election
- State: New South Wales
- Created: 1968
- MP: Trish Doyle
- Party: Labor
- Namesake: Blue Mountains
- Electors: 59,088 (2023)
- Area: 1,422.63 km^{2} (549.3 sq mi)
- Demographic: Provincial
Electorates around Blue Mountains:
Bathurst	Bathurst	Hawkesbury
Bathurst	Blue Mountains	Penrith
Bathurst	Wollondilly	Badgerys Creek

Blue Mountains is an electoral district of the Legislative Assembly in the Australian state of New South Wales. It is represented by Trish Doyle of the Labor Party, and as of the 3rd of February 2026 has 60,873 electors

== History ==
The Electoral district of the Blue Mountains was created in 1966 as a renaming of the Electoral district of Hartley (New South Wales).

The 2004 redistribution of electoral districts estimated that the electoral district would have 45,289 electors on 29 April 2007. Since the 2023 election, it has encompassed all of the City of Blue Mountains.

== Members for Blue Mountains ==
Member	Party	Period
Harold Coates	Independent	1968–1976
Mick Clough	Labor	1976–1981
Bob Debus	Labor	1981–1988
Barry Morris	Liberal	1988–1994
Barry Morris	Independent	1994–1995
Bob Debus	Labor	1995–2007
Phil Koperberg	Labor	2007–2011
Roza Sage	Liberal	2011–2015
Trish Doyle	Labor	2015–present

== Election results ==
2023 New South Wales state election: Blue Mountains
Party	Candidate	Votes	%	±%
Labor	Trish Doyle	28,613	53.9	+8.2
Liberal	Sophie-Anne Bruce	12,640	23.8	−5.7
Greens	Jenna Condie	6,669	12.6	+0.5
Animal Justice	Greg Keightley	2,285	4.3	+0.4
Informed Medical Options	Michelle Palmer	1,901	3.6	+3.6
Sustainable Australia	Richard Marschall	948	1.8	−1.1
Total formal votes		53,056	97.9	+0.3
Informal votes		1,143	2.1	−0.3
Turnout		54,199	91.7	−1.2
Two-party-preferred result
Labor	Trish Doyle	35,536	71.9	+8.3
Liberal	Sophie-Anne Bruce	13,893	28.1	−8.3
Labor hold		Swing	+8.3	

== See also ==
- List of Blue Mountains articles
