= Bob Debus =

Australian politician (born 1943)

The Honourable Bob Debus AM
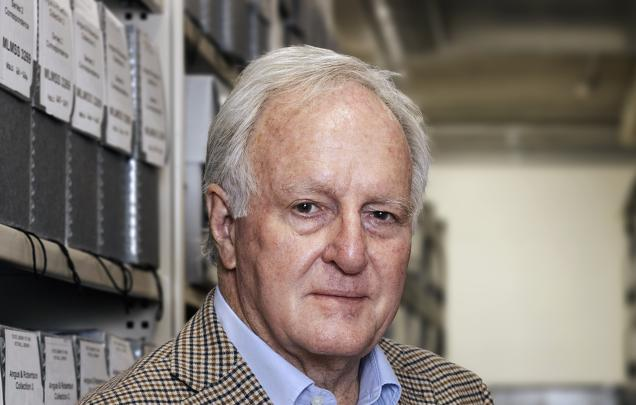

50th Attorney General of New South Wales
- In office 28 June 2000 – 2 April 2007
- Premier: Bob Carr; Morris Iemma
- Preceded by: Jeff Shaw
- Succeeded by: John Hatzistergos

Minister for Home Affairs
- In office 3 December 2007 – 9 June 2009
- Prime Minister: Kevin Rudd
- Preceded by: David Johnston (as Minister for Justice and Customs)
- Succeeded by: Brendan O'Connor

Member of the Australian Parliament for Macquarie
- In office 24 November 2007 – 19 July 2010
- Preceded by: Kerry Bartlett
- Succeeded by: Louise Markus

Personal details
- Born: 16 September 1943 (age 83) Ryde, New South Wales, Australia
- Party: Australian Labor Party

Robert John Debus AM (born 16 September 1943) is a former Australian politician who served as a member of the Australian House of Representatives and the New South Wales Legislative Assembly, representing the Labor Party. Debus has been a minister in both the Australian and New South Wales governments. He served in the NSW Parliament from 1981 to 1988 and again from 1995 to 2007; and in the Australian Parliament from 2007 to 2010.

Before his retirement from the NSW Parliament, at the 2007 state election, he held the portfolios of Attorney-General, Minister for the Environment, and Minister for the Arts; and represented the Blue Mountains electorate. Prior to his retirement from the Australian Parliament, at the 2010 federal election, he was Minister for Home Affairs in the Rudd Ministry; and served as Member for Macquarie. Debus is a prominent member of Labor's Socialist Left faction. On 6 June 2009, Bob Debus announced his resignation from the ministry and his retirement. He did not contest the 2010 federal election.

== Biography ==
Debus was born in Ryde, New South Wales and educated at Homebush Boys High School and Sydney University, graduating in Law and Arts in 1967. He worked as a publisher and lawyer. He worked as an ABC broadcaster, and was Executive Producer of the ABC's Department of Radio Talks and Documentaries 1970. He was also executive director of Australian Freedom from Hunger Campaign and Community Aid Abroad 1988–94, and advisor to Federal Minister for Administrative Services 1994–95.

== State politics ==
Debus was the member for Blue Mountains, west of Sydney, from 1981 to 1988. He was Minister for Employment from 1984 to 1986 and Minister for Finance from 1984 to 1988. Debus was also member for Blue Mountains from 1995 to 2007. He has held several ministerial positions in the New South Wales Government, including the Minister for Finance, Co-operative Societies and Assistant Minister for Education (between 1986 and 1988); the Minister for Corrective Services, Minister for Emergency Services and Minister Assisting the Minister for the Arts (between April 1995 and December 1997); the Minister for Energy, Minister for Tourism, Minister for Corrective Services and Minister Assisting the Minister for the Arts (between December 1997 and April 1999); the Minister for Energy, Minister for Tourism, Minister for Corrective Services, Minister for Emergency Services and Minister Assisting the Minister for the Arts (between April 1998 and April 1999); the Minister for the Environment, Minister for Emergency Services, Minister for Corrective Services and Minister Assisting the Premier on the Arts (April 1999 and January 2001); the Attorney General, Minister for the Environment, Minister for Emergency Services, and Minister Assisting the Premier on the Arts (between June 2000 and March 2003); and the Attorney General and Minister for the Environment (between March 2003 and March 2007).

Debus oversaw by far the largest ever reorganisation, expansion and re-equipment of emergency services across New South Wales. He was the longest serving environment minister in any Australian jurisdiction and oversaw the expansion of the national park system of New South Wales by over one-third . He undertook other environmental policy initiatives including the first program in Australia to successfully purchase water licences for the restoration of environmental flows in inland rivers; cleaner production and remediation laws which included pioneering emission trading schemes to reduce pollution; and the introduction of the first Extended Producer Responsibility laws in Australia. He initiated the project to create an unbroken chain of protected areas and other lands managed for conservation to stretch 2800 km along the Great Divide of Eastern Australia.

On 30 October 2006, he announced that he would retire from state politics at the 2007 state election.

=== Police Integrity Commission allegations ===
On 16 November 2006, Debus was accused by Liberal Party leader Peter Debnam under Parliamentary Privilege of being under investigation by the Police Integrity Commission. In response the Government released a NSW Police Service report stating that a minister had been the subject of complaints (not an investigation) which were dismissed in 2003 as spurious and groundless. The report did not name the minister concerned as it was deemed to be 'not in the public interest'. When Debnam failed to provide evidence to support his claims, he was censured by Parliament for misleading the House. It was subsequently reported that Debnam's source for the accusation was a convicted bank robber and child sex offender with a long history of making unsubstantiated allegations.

== Federal politics ==
On 30 March 2007 Debus confirmed longstanding rumours that he would seek preselection for the Federal seat of Macquarie. The seat had been redistributed to cover most of his state seat; he'd represented nearly all of the reconfigured Macquarie's eastern portion at one time or another. It had previously been a safe seat for then sitting member Kerry Bartlett of the Liberal Party, but the redistribution made it notionally Labor; Bartlett needed a 0.5 percent swing to retain the seat. On 24 November 2007 Debus won the election for the seat of Macquarie with a strong swing to Labor as his party won government. On 29 November Kevin Rudd announced he would be part of his new ministry. He was appointed Minister for Home Affairs in Kevin Rudd's First Ministry on 3 December 2007. This was a new ministry, and he was responsible for domestic law enforcement, including the Australian Federal Police and the Australian Security Intelligence Organisation.

On 6 June 2009, Prime Minister Rudd announced a cabinet reshuffle without Debus, who, after 28 years in state and federal politics had decided to retire. Debus did not contest the 2010 federal election.

It was revealed in October 2008 that the Australian Crime Commission had compiled a secret file on Debus, sparking condemnation by former and serving police officials. The file included details of his personal habits, views on police corruption and former Labor prime ministers.

== After politics ==
In December 2024, Debus was appointed as the president of the Library Council.

== Honours ==
On 13 June 2011, Debus was appointed as a Member of the Order of Australia for service to the Parliaments of Australia and New South Wales, to the development of an emergency response framework, through contributions to legal and environmental reforms, and to the community.

== See also ==
- First Rudd Ministry

New South Wales Legislative Assembly
Preceded by Mick Clough	Member for Blue Mountains; 1981–1988	Succeeded by Barry Morris
Preceded by Barry Morris	Member for Blue Mountains; 1995–2007	Succeeded by Phil Koperberg
Political offices
Preceded by Laurie Brereton	Minister for Employment; 1984–1986	Succeeded by Pat Hills
Preceded by Rodney Cavalier	Minister for Finance; 1984–1988	Vacant Title next held by George Souris
Preceded by Terry Sheahan	Minister for Co-operative Societies; 1986–1988	Vacant Title next held by Gerry Peacocke as Minister for Cooperatives
Vacant Title last held by Wal Fife	Assistant Minister for Education; 1986–1988	Vacant Title next held by Kerry Chikarovski
Preceded by Garry West	Minister for Emergency Services; 1995–1997	Succeeded by Brian Langton
Vacant Title last held by Terry Griffiths as Minister for Courts Administration and Corrective Services	Minister for Corrective Services; 1995–2001	Succeeded by John Watkins
New title	Minister Assisting the Premier on the Arts; 1996–2003	Succeeded by Frank Sartor
Preceded by Michael Egan	Minister for Energy; 1997–1999	Succeeded by Kim Yeadon
Preceded by Brian Langton	Minister for Tourism; 1997–1999	Succeeded by Sandra Nori
Preceded by Brian Langton	Minister for Emergency Services; 1998–2003	Succeeded by Tony Kelly
Preceded by Pam Allan	Minister for the Environment; 1999–2007	Succeeded by Phil Koperberg as Minister for Climate Change, Environment and Water
Preceded by Jeff Shaw	Attorney-General of New South Wales; 2000–2007	Succeeded by John Hatzistergos
Preceded by Bob Carr	Minister for the Arts; 2005–2007	Succeeded by Frank Sartor
Parliament of Australia
Preceded by Kerry Bartlett	Member for Macquarie; 2007–2010	Succeeded by Louise Markus
Political offices
New title	Minister for Home Affairs; 2007–2009	Succeeded by Brendan O'Connor
