= Stewarts River =

Coordinates: 31°43′S 152°36′E

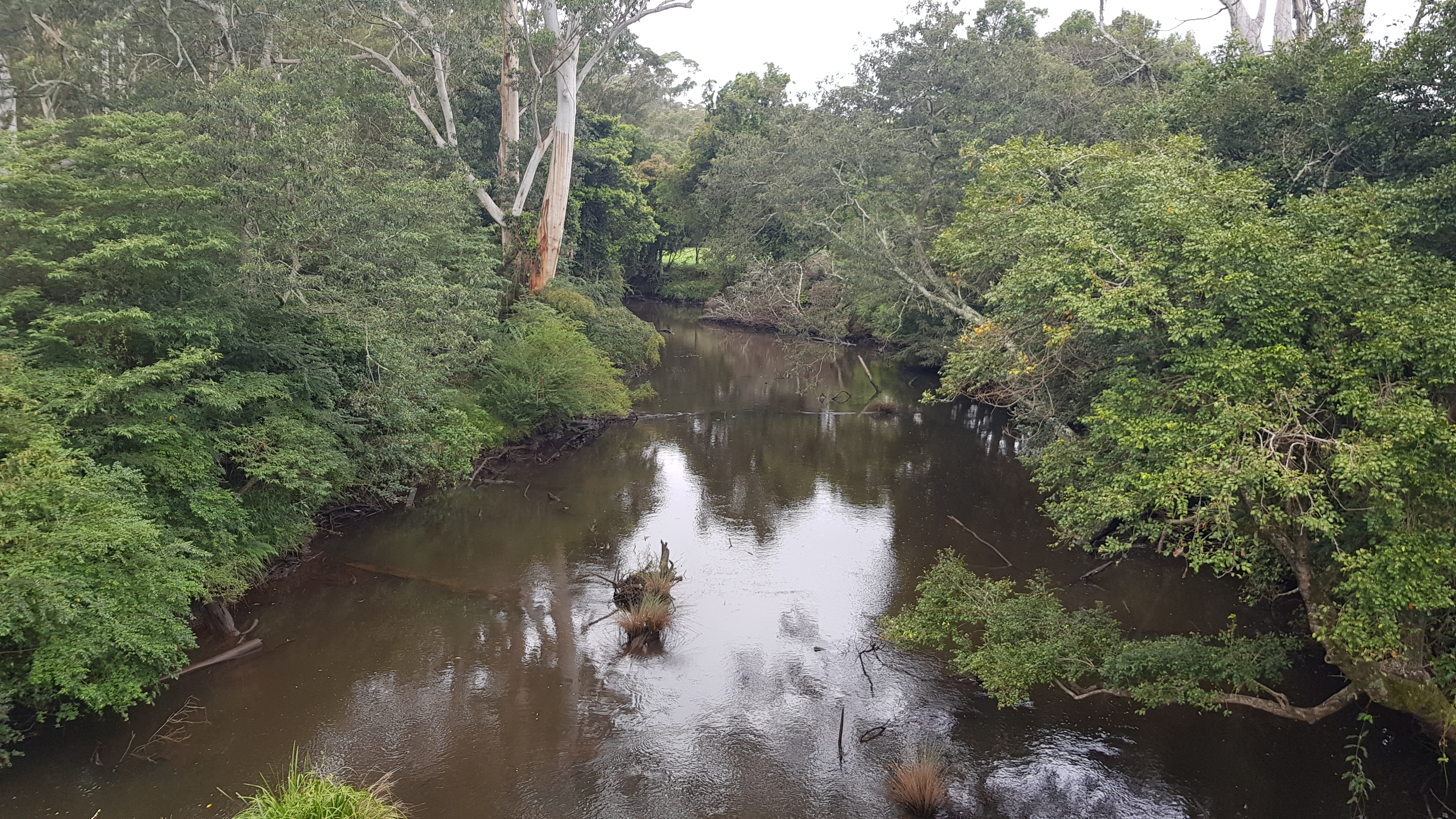
- Stewarts River at Johns River, 2023

Location
- Country: Australia
- State: New South Wales
- IBRA: NSW North Coast
- District: Mid North Coast
- local government area: Mid-Coast Council

Physical characteristics
- Source: Big Nellie, in Coorabakh National Park
  - location: west of the village of Hannam Vale
  - elevation: 555 m (1,821 ft)
- Mouth: Watson Taylors Lake
  - location: south of Camden Haven
  - elevation: 10 m (33 ft)
- Length: 62 km (39 mi)

Basin features
- Tributaries
  - left: Camden Haven River
- National park: Coorabakh NP, Crowdy Bay NP

Stewarts River, a mostly perennial stream of the Mid North Coast region, is located in New South Wales, Australia.

== Course and features ==
Stewarts River rises on the northern slopes of Big Nellie within Coorabakh National Park, west of the village of Hannam Vale, and flows generally east by south and then east, joined by the Camden Haven River, before reaching its mouth at Watson Taylors Lake, south of Camden Haven. The river descends 132 metres (433 ft) over its 62 kilometres (39 mi) course.

Stewarts River is transversed by the Pacific Highway north of the village of Johns River, between Coopernook and Kew.

== See also ==
- List of rivers of Australia
