= Johns River, New South Wales =

Johns River New South Wales
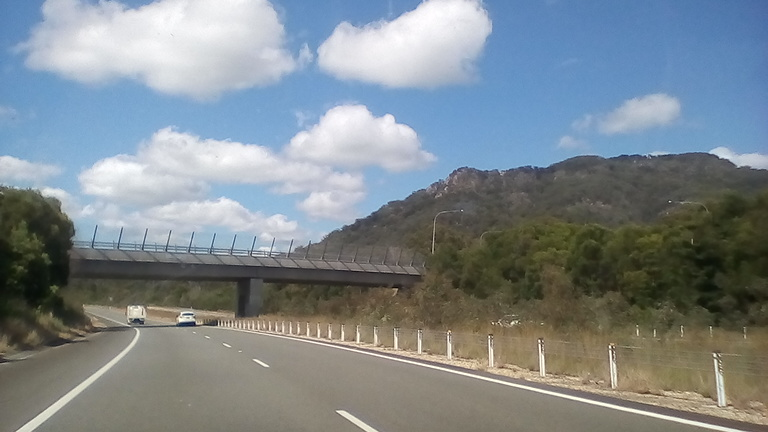
- The Pacific Highway, Johns River, New South Wales with South Brother to the right.

- Coordinates: 31.7303°S 152.6984°E
- Population: 346 (2021 census)
- Postcode(s): 2443
- Elevation: 10 m (33 ft)
- Location: 339 km (211 mi) NNE of Sydney; 199 km (124 mi) NE of Newcastle; 36 km (22 mi) ENE of Taree; 46 km (29 mi) SW of Port Macquarie
- LGA(s): Mid-Coast Council
- State electorate(s): Port Macquarie
- Federal division(s): Lyne
Localities around Johns River:
Lorne	Batar Creek	Diamond Head
Stewarts River	Johns River	Crowdy Bay
Moorland	Coralville	Coralville

Johns River is a locality in the Mid-Coast Council of New South Wales.

Johns River is approximately 339 km from the state capital, Sydney. At the 2021 census it had a population of 346.

== Geography ==
Johns River is bounded to the north by Middle Brother National Park and Crowdy Bay National Park to the East. The rural locality of Stewarts River, New South Wales is to the west and the Pacific Ocean to the east. The dominant land features of Johns River include Middle Brother and South Brother hills. Johns River is ironically located on Stewarts River which feeds into Watson Taylors Lake.

The Pacific Highway and North Coast railway line both pass through Johns River. The locality contains a small village with a family friendly tavern and a small private airfield.
