= 2021 eastern Australia floods =

Series of disastrous floods in Australia

2021 Eastern Australia floods
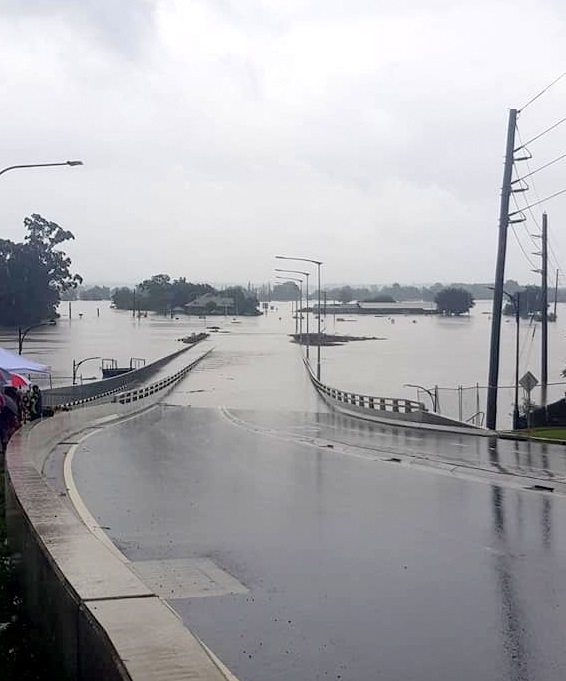
- Windsor Bridge submerged in western Sydney
- Date: 18 March 2021 – 29 March 2021
- Location: New South Wales; Mid North Coast, Hunter Valley and Western Sydney Queensland; Logan City and Gold Coast
- Deaths: 3 dead and 2 missing
- Property damage: A$2.9 billion (US$2.1 billion).

Extreme rainfall on the east coast of Australia beginning on 18 March 2021 led to widespread flooding in New South Wales, affecting regions from the North Coast to the Sydney metropolitan area in the south. Suburbs of Sydney experienced the worst flooding in 60 years, and the events were described by NSW Premier Gladys Berejiklian as "one in 100-year" flooding. Far-southeast communities in Queensland were also affected by flooding and heavy rainfall, though to a lesser extent than those in New South Wales.

The Australian government declared many parts of the east coast a natural disaster zone after the flooding rains forced 18,000 people to evacuate, in addition to over 1,000 flood rescues. Described as a "prolonged event" by Berejiklian and "dangerous and threatening" by the Bureau of Meteorology, the floods extended from the coastal towns of Taree and Kempsey on Thursday, 18 March, to the populated suburbs of western Sydney by Friday and Saturday.

The floods occurred less than 18 months after Australia was affected by the Black Summer bushfires, impacting many towns still recovering from the previous disaster.

== Background ==
=== Weather ===
Persistent, heavy rain fell from March 16 to March 23 in New South Wales. The Bureau of Meteorology reported that areas around Sydney and the Hunter Valley were drenched with more than 400 mm (16 in) to 600 mm (24 in) of rain in this time period. This region only receives an average of about 1,000 mm (39 in) to 1,500 mm (59 in) of rain in a year.

The storm brought record rainfall in the north coast, with towns near Port Macquarie, such as Kendall, seeing record rainfall of more than 400 mm (16 in) between 19 and 20 March. According to the Bureau of Meteorology, in an event described as "volatile, dangerous and dynamic", the heavy rainfall event was caused by a blocking high in the Tasman Sea (between Tasmania and New Zealand) that directed a strong, low pressure trough towards the NSW coast. The floods occurred due to the arrival of the La Nina weather pattern in September 2020, with the floods being La Nina's final storm event as the Bureau of Meteorology declared the phenomenon over on March 30.

=== Flooding ===
The state was not evacuated because of the floods. New South Wales State Emergency Service (SES) had responded to over 12,000 requests for help and 1000 direct flood rescues since 18 March during the storm, with the coastal area between the Mid North Coast and Greater Sydney being the most affected by the storm, where the SES had given flood evacuation warnings in many areas of these regions.

Across the state, 10,000 people have been affected by evacuation orders, though around 18,000 people have been evacuated from their homes (3,000 of those in Western Sydney and about 15,000 in the Mid North Coast), Many evacuation centres have been set-up to accommodate the displaced residents, in addition to over 130 school closures and road closures, which were cut off by water. Since 20 March, after the torrential rain began, around 450 gigalitres of water a day had been released from the Warragamba Dam, equal to the contents of Sydney Harbour, which is around 500 gigalitres.

The NSW and Australian governments had declared 16 natural disaster zones in areas from the central and mid-north coast, from Hunter Valley near Sydney, to Coffs Harbour, with the SES responding to 7,000 calls for assistance throughout the eastern seaboard. Major flooding occurred along the Hawkesbury River, the Macleay River, the Wollombi Brook, Rickabys Creek, Widemere Detention Basin, Manning River and the Colo River.

== Deaths and disappearances ==
Fatalities include one elderly man who lost control of his vehicle in heavy rain, colliding into a tree in Mona Vale, and a bodyboarder in his 60s who disappeared on the Coffs Harbour seashore and is presumed to be dead. On 24 March, two more fatalities were confirmed; In Glenorie, the body of a 25-year-old man was found trapped in a car approximately 6 metres (20 feet) underwater, whilst in Canungra, the body of a 38-year-old was found in an overturned ute in rapid floodwaters. An elderly woman was missing since March 26 after her car was found submerged in the waters. Her body was later recovered.

== Extent ==
=== Gold Coast and Logan Area ===
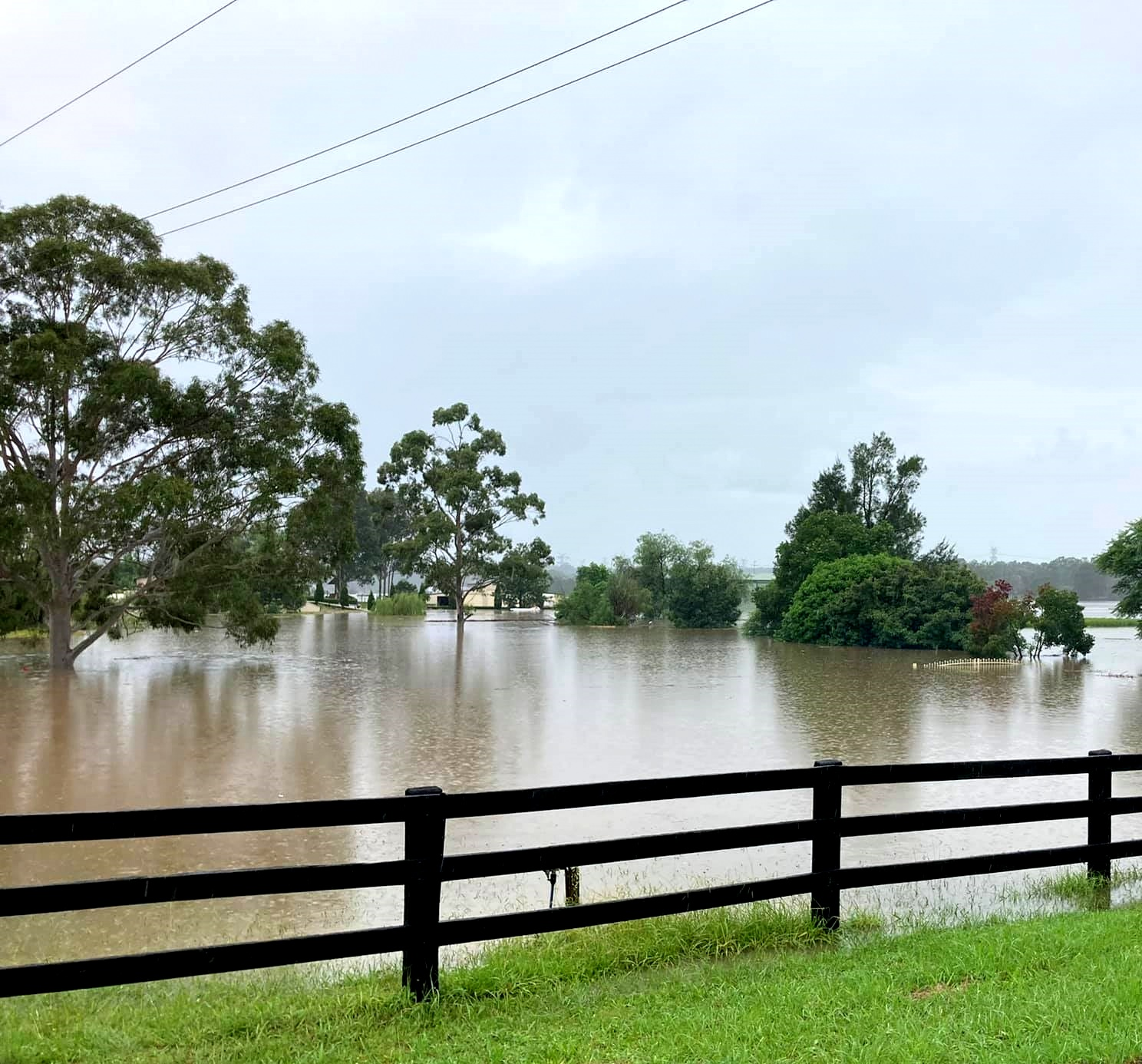
Submerged farmhouses near Richmond.

This region, including nearby Logan and Scenic Rim catchments recorded over 200 mm (7.9 in) of rain in just a few hours in the late night of 22 March 2021. This led to major flooding of both the Logan and Albert Rivers, where on the next day, with Gold Coast City Council announcing an evacuation notice to all residents on two of its roads, Crest Hill Drive and nearby Lanes Road in the suburb of Wongawallan. Nearby 8-hour rainfall totals on 22 March 2021 include Carbrook with 88 mm (3.5 in) and Springbrook with 75 mm (3.0 in).

=== Mid North Coast ===
In parts of this region, more than 200 mm (7.9 in) of rain had fallen in just two days causing lowland areas to flood and be reminiscent of inland seas. In Taree, a house was found drifting on the Manning River after heavy rainfall caused by this nor'easter. Additionally, many evacuations were ordered throughout the region, including Kempsey, Wingham, Dumaresq Island, Cundletown, Laurieton, Nambucca Heads, North Haven, Dunbogan, Bulahdelah, Kings Point, Macksville and the low-lying areas of Wauchope, Rawdon Island, Lower Macleay and Port Macquarie. Some towns in this region had received 700 mm (27.6 in) of rain since 18 March, including Comboyne which has registered 889 mm (35.0 in). The Manning River in Taree would end up swelling to 5.65 metres at its peak, falling just short of the record high of 6.0 metres set in 1929. As a result of debris being carried downstream, the Martin Bridge was closed off due to concerns of its structural integrity after being hammered with hay bales, shipping containers and other machinery.

All Qantas flights in Port Macquarie were cancelled after the airport was cut off by flooding roads. Around 5,500 customers in this region were without power. Furthermore, supermarkets were virtually emptied due to panic buying, with Woolworths in Lakewood being cleared of bread, eggs, meat and vegetables, reminiscent of the COVID-19 lockdowns a year ago, after residents were told to evacuate in nearby North Haven, Laurieton, Dunbogan and Diamond Head.

=== Hunter Valley ===
On Saturday 20 March until Wednesday 24 March, flights from and to Newcastle Airport were suspended due to flooding of the airfield. A number of roads in Newcastle, Lake Macquarie, Port Stephens, Cessnock and Maitland were closed due to them being overflowed by floods. Though overall, the Hunter region has mostly been spared from the predicted severity of the storm, with the Mid North Coast being the most devastated.

=== Sydney ===
Floodwaters swamp a picnic area in western Sydney.

On 20 March, a tornado damaged homes and toppled trees in Chester Hill, a western suburb of Sydney, leaving thousands without electricity. Heavy rain flooded the site of Parramatta Powerhouse and as well as the Parramatta ferry wharf, which was overflowed after Parramatta River broke its banks. The Warragamba Dam began to spill, which was the first significant overflow of the reservoir since 1990. Because of rising floodwaters, which were not seen since the November 1961 floods, Nepean River and Hawkesbury River were overflowed, peaking at 10 m (32.81 ft), with Windsor Bridge becoming submerged, leading to inundated homes and isolated animals.

Some areas within the suburbs of Jamisontown, Mulgoa, North Richmond, Hawkesbury Valley around Agnes Banks, Freemans Reach, Cornwallis, Pittown North, Richmond, Windsor and Penrith were submerged after the rivers burst their banks. Over 2,000 people living in or proximate to those suburbs were evacuated, in addition to many homes and farmlands being inundated therein. Residents within the Warragamba Dam catchment area were on high alert on 21 March after the city's main water source had reached its volume with the communities of North Richmond, Wallacia and Sackville being at most risk. Volunteers filled sandbags for the residents there to protect their homes.

The dam had received more than 150 mm (5.9 in) of rain between the 20th and 21st, and more than 250 mm (9.8 in) until 22 March. Sydney CBD received 110 mm (4.3 in) of rain on the 20th, whereas Hornsby had gotten 120 mm (4.7 in) and Picton and Oakdale had 160 mm (6.3 in), with some areas receiving four times more rain in two days than the entire March monthly average.

== Response ==
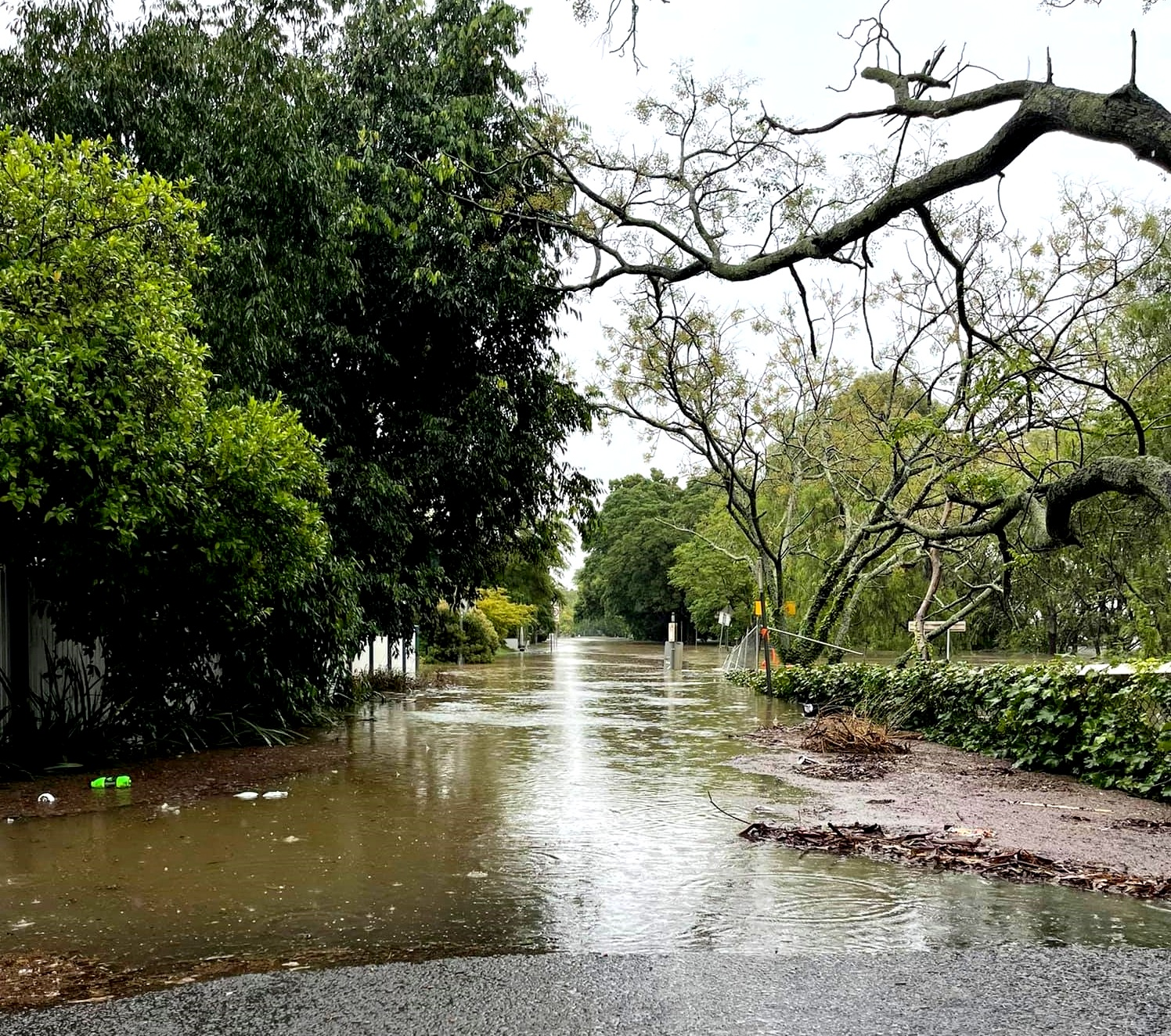
Flooded road near Windsor

Australian Prime Minister Scott Morrison said, "Australia is being tested once again", before addressing, "the terrible storms and floods that have been ravaging NSW for the past few days are taking a heavy toll", where he mentioned that he has been in regular contact with Berejiklian. Morrison had praised emergency workers and volunteers, where he encouraged people in the disaster zones regions to heed the advices and warnings, stating, "for now, our message is very clear to keep yourself safe, to keep your family safe and those around you to follow the instructions of the very competent, professional agencies and bodies and the volunteers who support them."

Premier Berejiklian stated, "I don't know any time in the state's history where we have had these extreme weather conditions in such quick succession [and] in the middle of a pandemic."

Climate Council spokesperson Professor Will Steffan stated that intense rainfall and flood events are occurring more frequently due to climate change.

European Commission's European External Action Service activated the Copernicus Emergency Management Service – Mapping in order to produce delineation and damage grading maps of floods in the Beaudesert, Bulahdelah, Grafton, Greater Port Macquarie, Kempsey, Laurieton, Maitland, Moree, Tamworth, Taree, Western Sydney and Wisemans Ferry areas of interest.

=== Aid ===
A one-off payment of $1,000 will be available for eligible adults and $400 for eligible children who were seriously injured, displaced, whose homes have been damaged or had family members who had lost their lives as a result of the storms and floods. According to SES Deputy Commissioner Daniel Austin, the cleanup operation will go for many more weeks after the floods had subsided and well into Easter. The government had announced it was broadening its disaster recovery assistance to cover another 18 local government areas in Sydney.

Local RFS had ferried food and essential supplies to residents living in homes that were isolated by floodwaters, along the Hawkesbury River at Wisemans Ferry. The Australian Defence Force joined the flood relief effort in NSW on March 23, with 290 personnel deployed to the affected areas. Military helicopters went on search and rescue missions after the NSW Government asked for aid.

Scott Morrison visited the flood affected sites, meeting the affected residents in Penrith, where he stated, "It’s heartbreaking to see the damage to so many communities, especially to those who have barely recovered from the bushfires". He announced an extension of a $5 million loans scheme for flood-affected businesses up to $250 million in turnover, with no payments needed for two years for the 10-year loan. A clean-up program funded evenly between the federal and NSW governments has aided households, businesses, farmers and local councils recuperate from the floods. Both the federal and NSW governments have also given recovery grants to small businesses of up to $50,000 and grants to primary producers of up to $75,000 where damage had happened.

=== Dam control dispute ===
The NSW government cabinet ministers had strong disagreements over Warragamba Dam management during the flooding, where Emergency Services Minister David Elliott blamed Water Minister Melinda Pavey for not preparing the dam in the context of La Niña, while Pavey stated that the dam did not exacerbate the flooding. Premier Gladys Berejiklian, in concordance with Elliot, stated, "you would have had to reduce the capacity of the dam to around 20 or 25 percent which just wouldn't have been feasible." Elliott said that Pavey's unwillingness to reduce levels was because she was worried about the aspect of wasting water rather than saving homes from flooding.

In response to the floods, the NSW government has again proposed to raise the dam wall - this has been under discussion since 2017. The proposal has been criticised as impacting Indigenous heritage and cultural sites in the area. State Emergency Service planner Chas Keys stated that the government should rather focus on evacuation routes and decelerating population growth in the flood plains between Penrith, downstream of Windsor in the valley of the south creek and the valley of the Hawkesbury proper. Western Sydney minister Stuart Ayres supported the idea, saying that a higher Warragamba Dam wall "will have a profound impact on the number of people who would have to be evacuated and the number of properties that would be inundated."

== Impacts ==
=== Economy ===
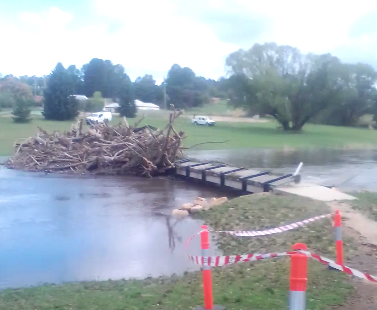
Damage to footbridge of Bombala River.

More than 11,000 damage claims were made between 20 and 23 March with the Insurance Council of Australia declaring large swathes of the state an "insurance catastrophe". The worst affected regions were from the mid-north coast towns of Port Macquarie, Kempsey, Laurieton and Taree, and west Sydney in localities around Penrith and the Hawkesbury-Nepean valley.

Farmers in the Mid-North Coast had warned that the floods will contribute to higher food prices, since they had caused hundreds of livestock losses (where some ended up in backyards and suburban streets), crop loss and infrastructure damage, in addition to extensive property damage reaching tens of thousands of dollars, particularly in the mid-north coast. The region produces bananas, avocados and as well as 75% of Australia's blueberries. As such, The NSW Farmers' Association has established a flood appeal through its Natural Disaster Relief Fund to assist farmlands to continue operating.

Due to the road and rail closures, stock issues became significant for supermarkets in the flooded areas, with both supermarket chains Coles and Woolworths having shortages due to the deliveries of stock being delayed.

=== Entertainment ===
Due to the floods, the W-League and A-League clashes between Sydney FC and Melbourne Victory were cancelled, as well as Golden Slipper meeting at Rosehill Racecourse.

=== Wildlife ===
Due to the extent of the floods and prolonged rainy days, a large number of burrowing animals such as echidnas and wombats are feared to have been drowned in their inundated burrows. Continuous downpours and floods are usually detrimental for wildlife, though the degree to which the disaster has affected wild animals will become apparent after the floodwaters subside. Moreover, wildlife workers had rescued kangaroos stuck in drainpipes, animals hit by cars after escaping for safer ground, and as well as turtles and seabirds who were swept away from their natural habitat.

In the flood affected areas, swarms of spiders and insects (such as crickets and ants), in addition to a few skinks, scarpered into homes to reach higher ground. Those coming in contact with spiders were urged to show empathy, even if they were frightened, as they are crucial to the ecosystem.

=== Health ===
There were environmental health risks in flood clean up, with NSW health issuing advice for those in the affected areas during the clean-up stage to treat all floodwater as potentially contaminated, since they may be contaminated with sewage and chemicals. According to acting director of Environmental Health, Dr Adi Vyas, floodwaters can contain diseases that could lead to skin and stomach infections, and even serious conditions, such as leptospirosis. He urged those cleaning up to always wear protective gear, including gloves and face masks, and to boil water prior to drinking and for washing raw food.

Because of contamination fears, many beaches on the NSW coast closed due to polluted and hazardous water. Surf Life Saving NSW had urged people to be careful when swimming at beaches that are proximate to lagoons, river mouths or waterway runoffs.

The floods caused major delays to COVID-19 vaccine delivery in the state due to roads being cut off, where over 1000 deliveries were scheduled. Though Premier Berejiklian told reporters, "I'm not concerned, we will catch that up".

== See also ==
- Severe storm events in Sydney
- 1955 Hunter Valley floods
- 2022 eastern Australia floods
- 2022 New South Wales floods
