= Camden Haven River =

River in New South Wales, Australia

Camden Haven River Camden Haven River Southern Branch
- Camden Haven River at North Haven, 2009

Location
- Country: Australia
- State: New South Wales
- IBRA: NSW North Coast
- District: Mid North Coast
- Local government areas: Port Macquarie-Hastings, Mid-Coast Council

Physical characteristics
- Source: Mount Gibraltar, Gibraltar Range
  - location: west of Lorne
  - coordinates: 31°38′55″S 152°30′4″E
  - elevation: 698 m (2,290 ft)
- Source confluence: Stewarts River with Queens Lake
  - location: Watson Taylors Lake, near Laurieton
  - coordinates: 31°42′10″S 152°42′29″E
  - elevation: 0 m (0 ft)
- Mouth: Tasman Sea, South Pacific Ocean
  - location: Camden Head
  - coordinates: 31°38′55″S 152°48′4″E
  - elevation: 0 m (0 ft)
- Length: 72 km (45 mi)
- Basin size: 589 km^{2} (227 sq mi)

Basin features
- National parks: Crowdy Bay, Dooragan

Camden Haven River, an open and trained intermediate wave dominated barrier estuary, is located in the Mid North Coast region of New South Wales, Australia.

== Course and features ==
Camden Haven River upper catchment starts at the two branches of Upsalls Creek and the Southern Branch at the edge of the Comboyne Plateau escarpment. The merged flow of the two branches form the river which flows across the Lorne Basin, then between North and South Brother Mountains, to the estuary. The estuary waters together with the outflow of Queens Lake spills into the [South Pacific Ocean]. The river descends 698 metres (2,290 ft) over its 72 kilometres (45 mi) course.

Camden Haven River is transversed by the Pacific Highway north of the village of Rossglen, between Coopernook and Kew.

== See also ==
- Rivers of New South Wales
- List of rivers of Australia
