= Patty Thomas =

American dancer and actor, United Service Organizations person

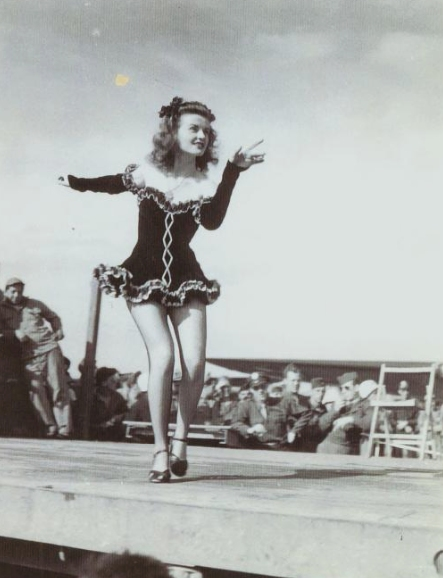
- Born: August 1, 1922; Erie, Pennsylvania, U.S.
- Died: March 29, 2014 (aged 91); Newport Beach, California, U.S.
- Other names: Patricia Thomas; USO-Troops All American Girl; Hope:What You are Fighting For; Pat Thomas
- Occupations: Dancer, USO entertainer, Actress
- Years active: 1938–2004
- Known for: Bob Hope USO tours Bob Hope TV Shows; The Ladies Man; You Can't Take It with You; Good friend of Dolores Hope

"Once you've entertained these boys and you've made them happy, you know that you have to keep going until you just can't do it anymore." - Patty Thomas

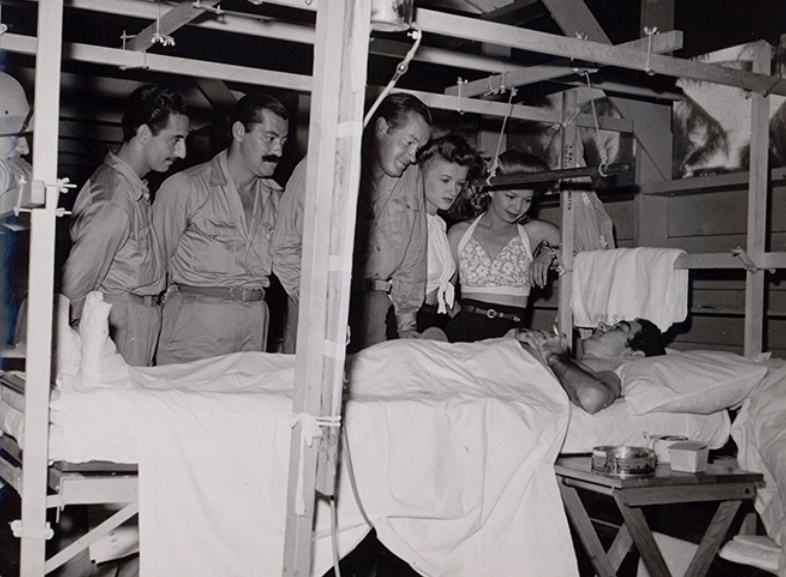
Bob Hope and his 1944 USO troupe visiting a hospital ward in the South Pacific (from left) Tony Romano, Jerry Colonna, Bob Hope, Patty Thomas, and Frances Langford.

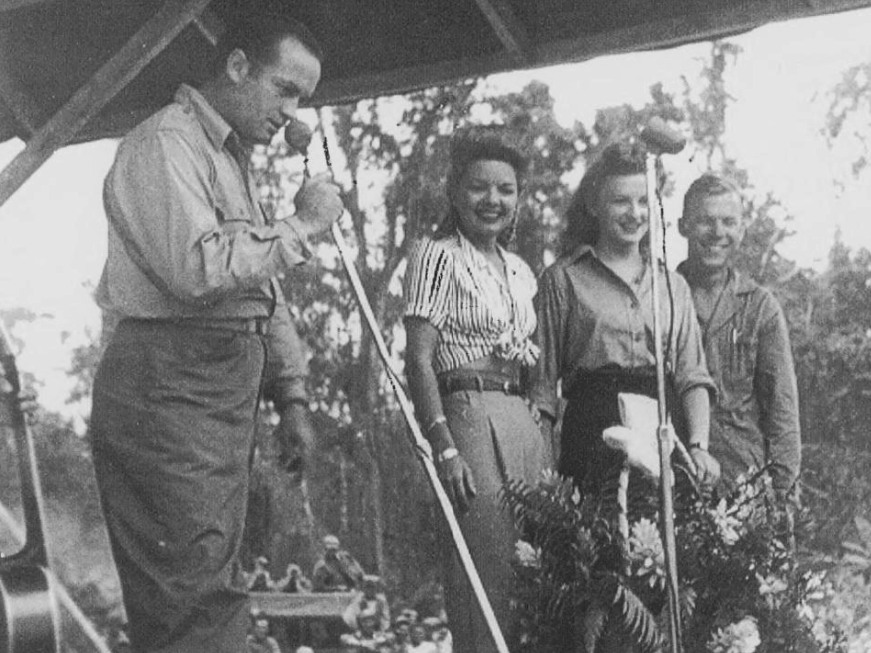
Bob Hope, Patty Thomas and Frances Langford with GI giving local flowers to them in a 1944 show

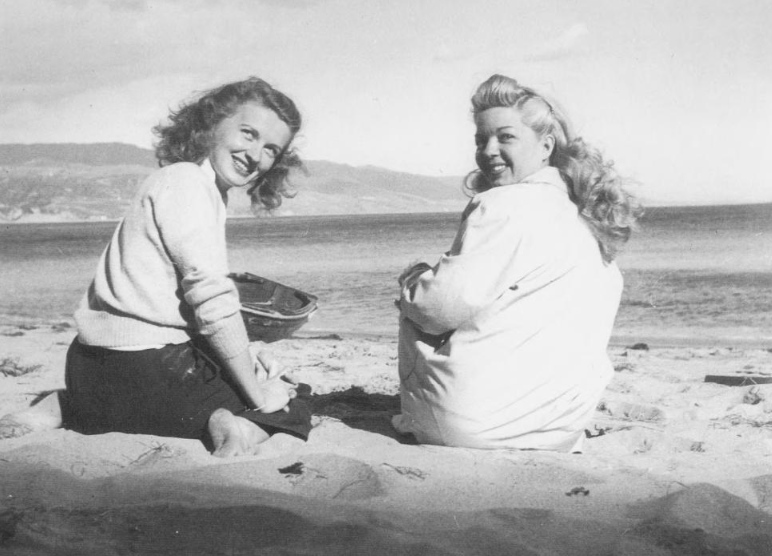
Patty Thomas and Frances Langford in 1944 on a South Pacific beach, a Naval Base on the Bob Hope USO tour.

Patty Thomas (born Patricia Thomas; August 1, 1922 – March 29, 2014) was an American dancer, USO entertainer, and actress. She appeared in the films You Can't Take It with You (1938) and The Ladies Man (1961), before touring with Bob Hope during and after World War II.

== Early life ==
Patricia Thomas was born on August 1, 1922 in Erie, Pennsylvania.

== Career ==
=== Bob Hope Show ===
After doing shows with Laurel and Hardy for four years, Thomas joined state-side USO tours for ten months in 1943. Hope saw Thomas tap dance in Hollywood and invited her to join the USO tour. Hope and Thomas both worked for Paramount Studios. Hope called his USO World War II military tour of the South Pacific in 1944: “Loew's Malaria Circuit” and “the Pineapple Circuit”. Hope and Thomas did 150 shows in the two 1/2 months they were on road. Hope and Thomas would do Soft shoe dance together in the show and Thomas would do solo tap dance numbers. In 1944, Thomas and Hope, with singer Jerry Colonna and Frances Langford and musician guitarist Tony Romano. Also on the tour were singer Gale Robbins, musicians June Brenner and Ruth Denas, and comedians Roger Price and Jack Pepper. The tours visited: Naval Base Pearl Harbor Hawaii at the Nimitz Bowl, Naval Base Eniwetok, Naval Base Cairns, Green Islands, Pavuvu, Bougainville, Milner Bay, Naval Base Treasury Islands, Naval Base Mios Woendi called Wendy Island, and Naval Base Kwajalein. Thomas entertained Troops not just on stage, she danced on the hood of Jeeps and on boards placed in mud due to tropical storms.

On 14 August 1944, Hope, Thomas, and his tour group had one scary detour on the tour the team was flying in a United States Navy Consolidated PBY Catalina, called Spare Gear seaplane in Australia and one of the engines stopped working. The crew ask that luggage be tossed out so the plane would be lighter and stay in the air longer. Thomas seeing everything going out the door, tied her tap dance shoes around her neck for safety and prayed. After tossing out the tools and emergency supplies, the plane made an unplanned landing on the Camden Haven River in Laurieton, New South Wales. The problem was a broken fuel line, that was repaired. The tour and plane crew stayed at a local hotel overnight. The group did a tour for the small town before continuing on to Naval Base Sydney. The flight had started in Naval Base New Guinea.

After the South Pacific tour, Hope, Thomas and the tour did a European show. The European show did 13 shows in Germany: Bremen, Berlin, Bad Kissingen, Schweinfurt, Heidelberg, Furstenfeldbruck, Fritzlar, Kassel, Munich, Nuremberg and Mannheim. The tour was in Nuremberg when Germany surrendered. The tour visit Eagle's Nest Hitler's command in Germany. The tour was able to After German tours the Navy requested a show in Monte Carlo and the tour did a show there before heading home. The show also did a tour of Austria and Czechoslovakia as the war was coming to an end. Thomas was born in Pennsylvania but while young, she and her mother moved to California after her father died. Thomas joined The Bob Hope Shows': At bases in Alaska 12 Christmas shows in 1949 and Bob's 1st overseas USO Xmas show, filmed at Goose Air Base in Labrador and Thule Air Base in Greenland in 1954. In 1959, the 1944 tour, put on shows in Alaska.

Thomas joined Hope on The Colgate Comedy Hour: The Bob Hope Christmas Show in 1955. At the age of 16, she started working with dancing with Al Ross, her teacher, choreographer, and manager, her parents Howard and Anna Thomas had signed her up for dance lessons at a young age. At age 21 she was touring with Bob Hope. She celebrated her 22nd birthday with Bob Hope at Naval Base Cairns in Queensland, Australia. In large venues, like the Nimitz Bowl, so the Troops could her tap dance Hope followed her around a microphone. Hope often told the troops I just wanted you boys to see what you're fighting for. and introduced Thomas. Thomas visited troops in hospitals. Touring the tropical jungles Thomas got problems with her ears and later suffered hearing loss. After World War II, Thomas continued to tour and be friends with Bob Hope and Dolores Hope. The tours also made Thomas and Frances Langford close friends. Hope and Thomas did a Bob Hope Independence Day Concert on 4 July 1945 at the Royal Albert Hall London. Thomas appeared on Bob Hope television specials starting in 1950.

== Films ==
Thomas appeared in the 1961 film The Ladies Man, 1938 film You Can't Take It with You. She also was in Smooth Sailing, a 1947 short film by Jerry Hopper, and the 2003 film Los no invitados.

== Death and legacy ==
Thomas died on March 29, 2014, in Newport Beach, California.

Who Threw That Coconut! is a 1945 memoir by Jerry Colonna about the USO tours with Bob Hope, Thomas and others. Entertaining the Troops: American Entertainers in World War II is a 1988 documentary about American celebrities and entertainers who sold war bonds during World War II and those who participated in the USO campaign to provide entertainment to armed forces personnel at military bases in the U.S. and abroad. It is noted for the reunion of Hope's tour troupe of Patty Thomas, Frances Langford and Tony Romano.

Patty is also remembered in the 1995 TV Movie, Bob Hope: Memories of World War II. Patty Thomas's Pith helmet from 1944 is on display at The National WWII Museum, it was given to her by troops of Group Pacific 7, a naval supply base in the Naval Base Marshall Islands. The Library of Congress has a page on Patty Thomas and her service to the United States Armed Forces over the years.

== Gallery ==
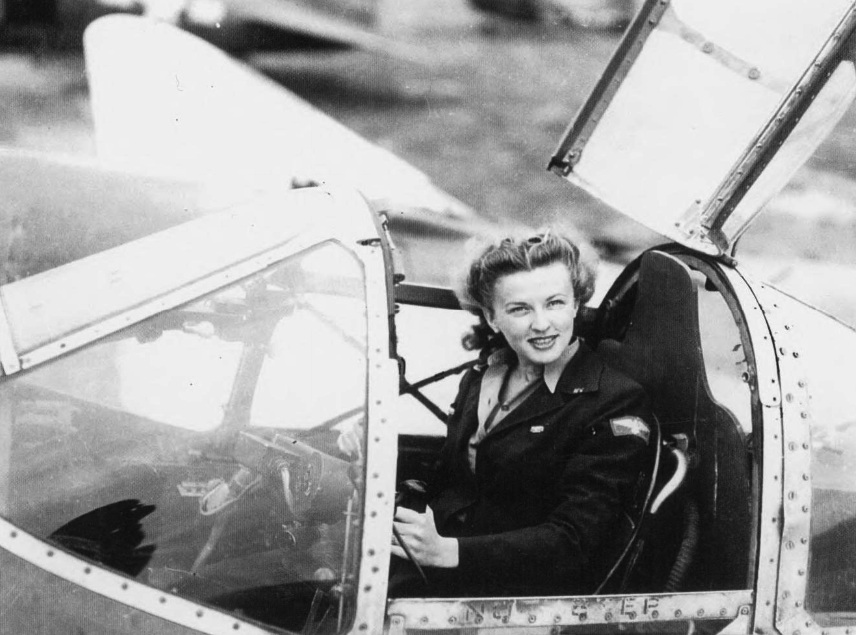
Patty Thomas in a Lockheed P-38 Lightning plane in Europe during May 1945 on Bob Hope USO tour.

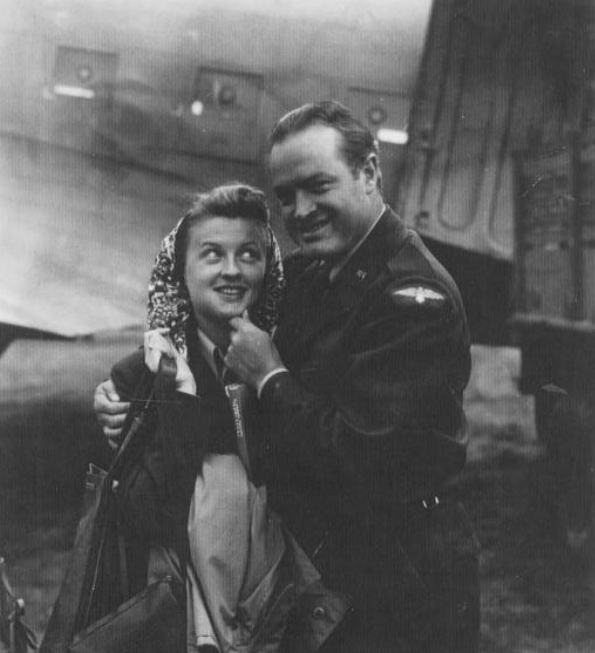
Bob Hope and Patty Thomas in Germany in 1945 on USO tour, in front of a transport plane, Thomas had an infected wisdom tooth in this photo. Thomas went to a Paris hospital for a few days and then rejoined the tour.

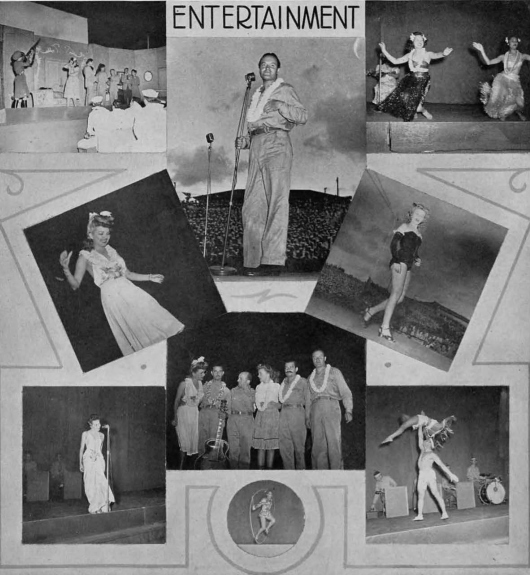
US Navy Seabee 117th Naval Construction Battalion clipart from 1944, right center is Patty Thomas

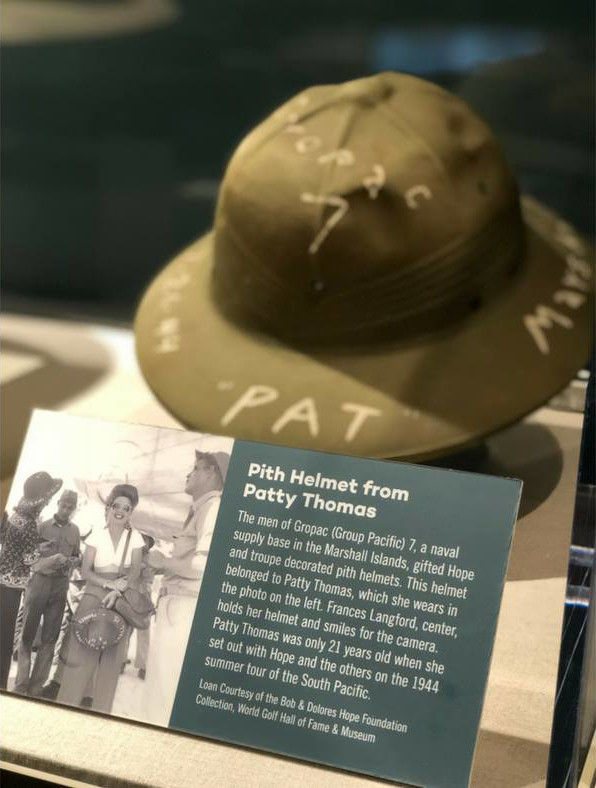
Patty Thomas's pith helmet from 1944 at The National WWII Museum. It was given to her by troops of Group Pacific 7, a naval supply base in the Naval Base Marshall Islands.

Hope, Thomas and tour Consolidated PBY Catalinans emergency landing in Australia in 1944. US Navy pilot James Ferguson standing beside Jerry Colonna with moustache and Bob Hope in the background on the Camden Haven River in Laurieton, New South Wales.

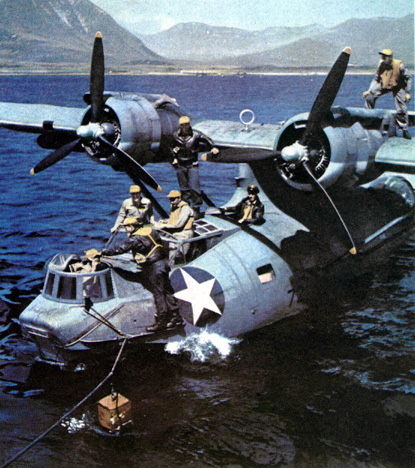
A Consolidated PBY Catalina seaplane and its crew, the plane is like the one Hope and Thomas used in the 1944 tour.

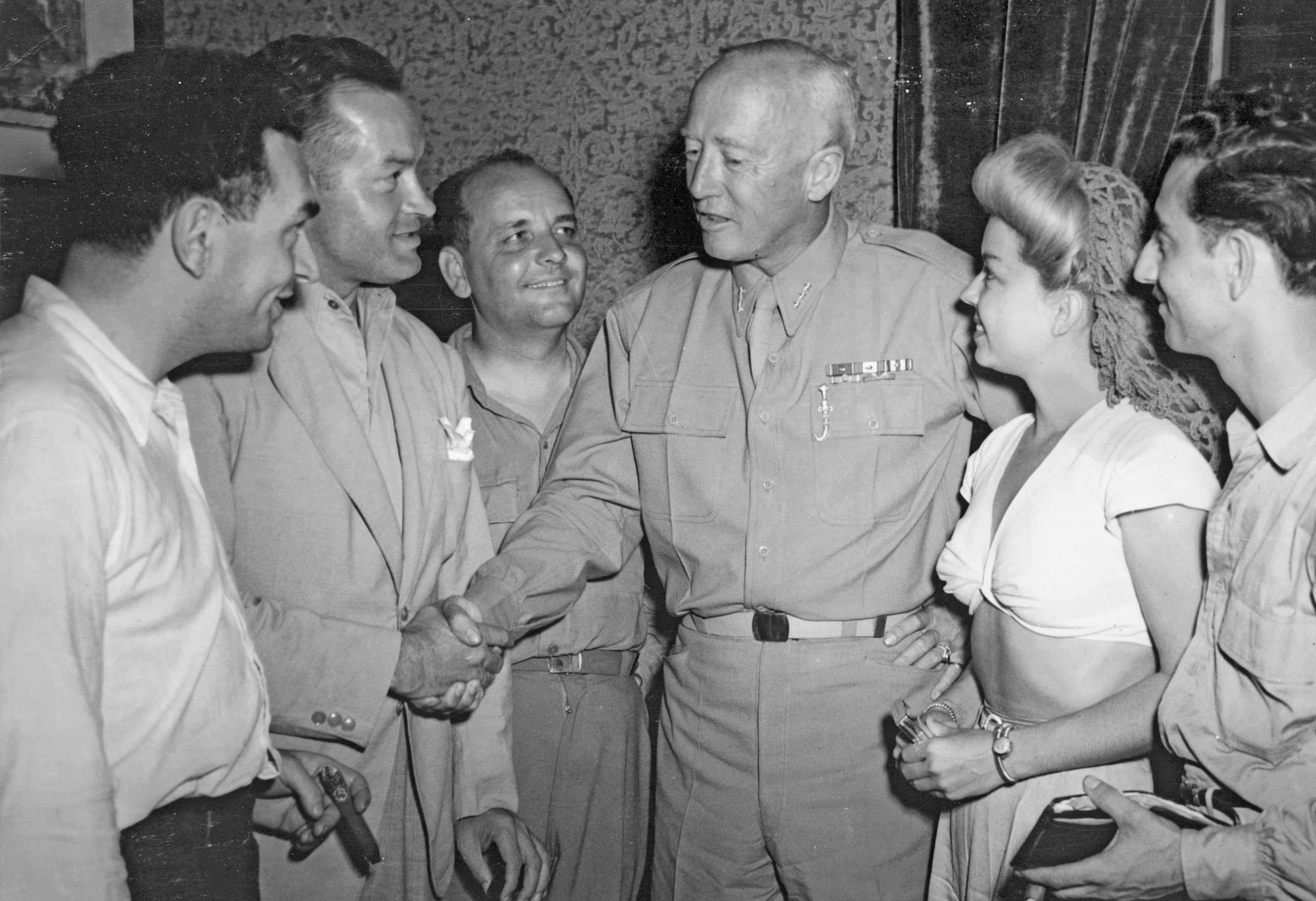
Hal Block (far left), Bob Hope, Barney Dean, General George S. Patton, Frances Langford and Tony Romano, Thomas was on this tour, but is out of the frame for this photo. Thomas and Langford became good friends, after touring and bunking together on the tours.

== See also ==
- US Naval Advance Bases
- Chris Noel
