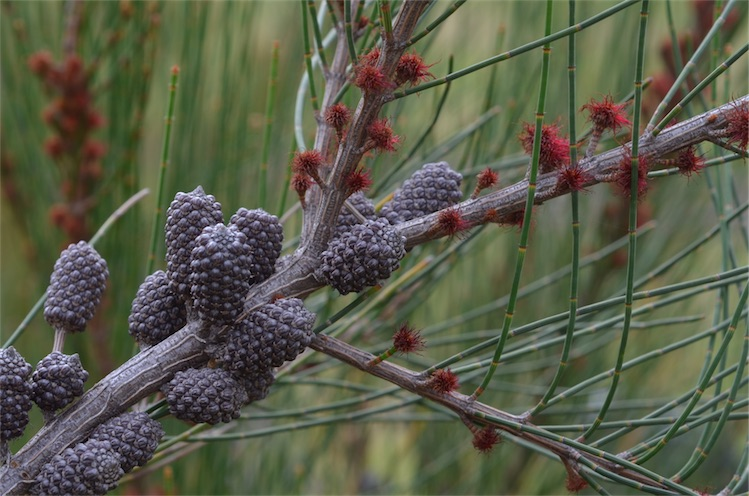
- In Mount Annan Botanic Garden

Scientific classification
- Kingdom: Plantae
- Clade: Tracheophytes
- Clade: Angiosperms
- Clade: Eudicots
- Clade: Rosids
- Order: Fagales
- Family: Casuarinaceae
- Genus: Allocasuarina
- Species: A. rigida

Binomial name
- Allocasuarina rigida (Miq.) L.A.S.Johnson
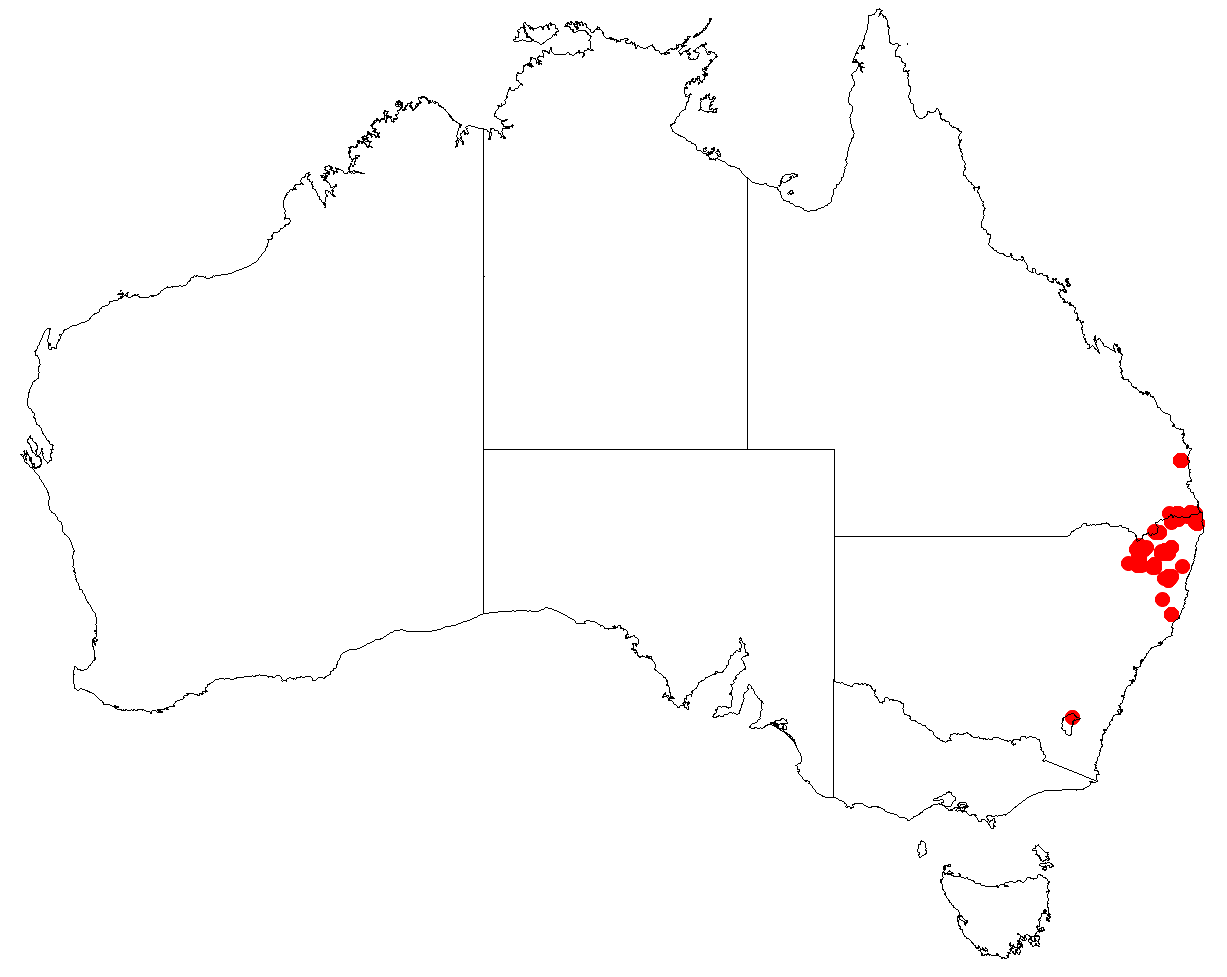
- Occurrence data from AVH

= Allocasuarina rigida =

Species of flowering plant

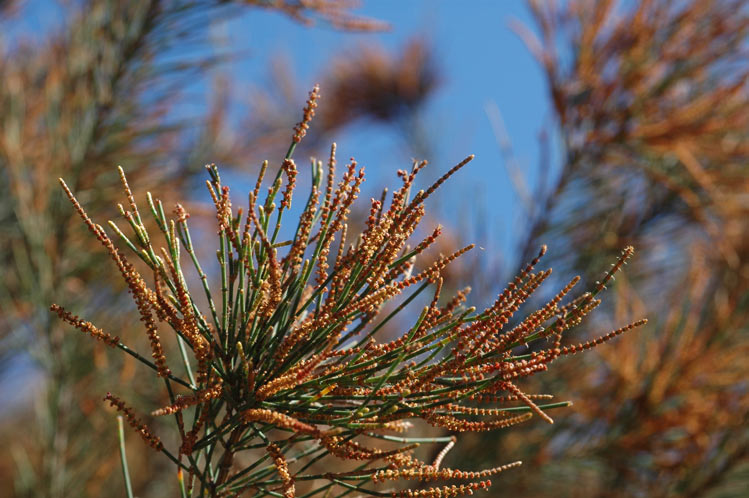
Male spikes

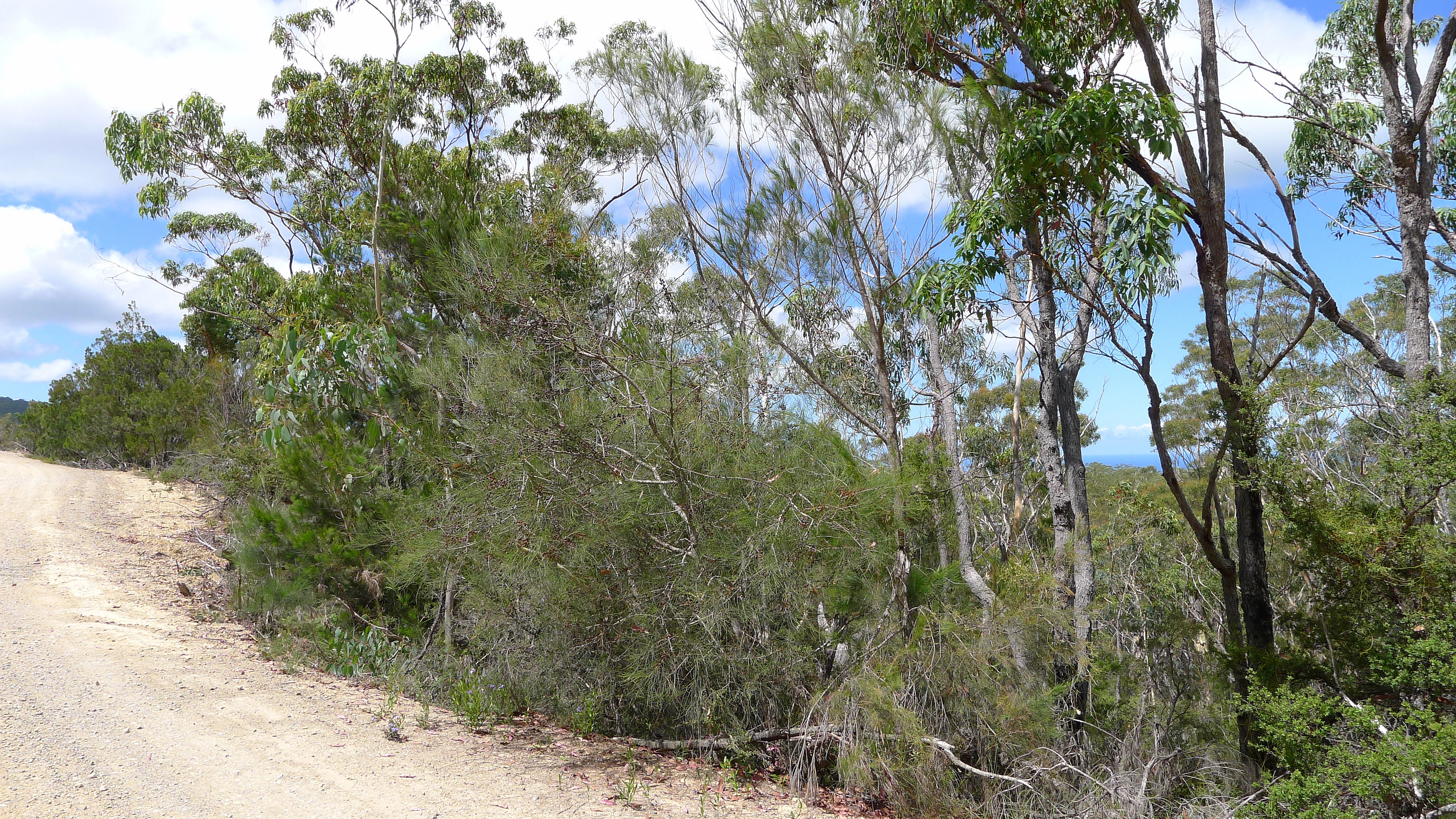
Habit in Mount Jerusalem National Park

Allocasuarina rigida is a species of flowering plant in the family Casuarinaceae and is endemic to eastern Australia. It is a dioecious shrub that has branchlets up to 330 mm (13 in) long, the leaves reduced to scales in whorls of seven to ten, and the fruiting cones 8–27 mm (0.31–1.06 in) long containing winged seeds 3.0–7.5 mm (0.12–0.30 in) long.

== Description ==
Allocasuarina rigida is dioecious shrub that typically grows to a height of 0.5–4 m (1 ft 8 in – 13 ft 1 in) and has smooth bark. Its branchlets are more or less erect and up to 330 mm (13 in) long, the leaves reduced to scale-like teeth 0.4–1.3 mm (0.016–0.051 in) long, arranged in whorls of seven to ten around the branchlets. The sections of branchlet between the leaf whorls are 10–25 mm (0.39–0.98 in) long, 0.7–1.5 mm (0.028–0.059 in) wide. Male flowers are arranged in spikes 10–70 mm (0.39–2.76 in) long, with about 4 to 6.5 whorls per centimetre (per 0.39 in.), and often appear like a string of beads, the anthers 0.7–1.2 mm (0.028–0.047 in) long. Female cones are on a peduncle 2–9 mm (0.079–0.354 in) long, and mature cones are cylindrical to ovoid, 8–27 mm (0.31–1.06 in) long and 7–14 mm (0.28–0.55 in) in diameter, containing brown, winged seeds 3.0–7.5 mm (0.12–0.30 in) long.

== Taxonomy ==
This sheoak was first formally described in 1848 by Friedrich Anton Wilhelm Miquel who gave it the name Casuarina rigida in the journal, Revisio critica Casuarinarum from specimens collected near Moreton Bay. In 1982, Lawrie Johnson transferred the species to Allocasuarina as A. rigida in the Journal of the Adelaide Botanic Gardens.

In the same journal, Johnson described two subspecies of A. rigida and the names are accepted by the Australian Plant Census:

- Allocasuarina rigida subsp. exsul L.A.S.Johnson has branchlet sections 10–14 mm (0.39–0.55 in) long and mature cones 9–19 mm (0.35–0.75 in) long and 6–11 mm (0.24–0.43 in) wide
- Allocasuarina rigida subsp. rigida L.A.S.Johnson has branchlet sections 10–25 mm (0.39–0.98 in) long and mature cones 8–27 mm (0.31–1.06 in) long and 7–14 mm (0.28–0.55 in) wide

== Distribution and habitat ==
Allocasuarina rigida grows in sandy soil on volcanic outcrops in exposed situations from the McPherson Range in south-eastern Queensland to the Gibraltar Range National Park and Ebor in north-eastern New South Wales and in disjunct populations on Mount Cooroora in south-eastern Queensland and Big Nellie Mountain near Taree in north eastern New South Wales. Subspecies exsul only occurs on Mount Cooroora and subsp. rigida occurs throughout the remainder of the range.
