= North Haven, New South Wales =

North Haven
- Town
- North Haven foreshore with North Brother in the background

- Coordinates: 31°38′21″S 152°49′04″E
- Country: Australia
- State: New South Wales
- City: Camden Haven
- LGA: Port Macquarie-Hastings Council
- Location: 21 km (13 mi) south of Port Macquarie; 361 km (224 mi) north of Sydney

Government
  - State electorate: Port Macquarie
  - Federal division: Lyne

Population
  - Total: 1,567 (2006 census)
- Postcode: 2443
Localities around North Haven
Queens Lake	Bonny Hills	Tasman Sea
Laurieton	North Haven	Tasman Sea
Laurieton	Dunbogan	Dicks Hill

North Haven is a town in the Camden Haven district on the Mid North Coast of New South Wales, Australia. As the suburb's name suggests, North Haven is located on the northern shore of Camden Haven and is connected to the nearby commercial centre of Laurieton by a bridge.

North Haven is mainly residential, though there is a small row of shops along the main street, Ocean Drive. Like much of the Mid North Coast, the suburb is notable for its large proportion of retirees; the median age at the 2006 Census was 57.

== History ==
In the early 1930s, North Haven only had two permanent residents: the Ostler and Eames families. During some period, a rutile sandmining plant was erected at the mouth of the Camden Haven River, by the breakwall.
