= Tony Romano (musician) =

American musician (1915–2005)

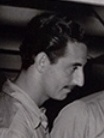
- Tony Romano in 1944

Background information
- Born: September 26, 1915; Madera, California, U.S.
- Died: March 4, 2005 (aged 89) Santa Ana, California, U.S.
- Genre: Jazz
- Occupation: Musician
- Instruments: Guitar, vocals
- Years active: 1930–2000

Tony Romano (September 26, 1915 – March 4, 2005) was an American jazz guitarist and singer. He performed on radio programs and in Hollywood musicals in the 1930s, 1940s, and 1950s. He became most noted as the sideman and musical accompanist to Bob Hope, Patty Thomas and Frances Langford during their USO tours in World War II, Korean, and Vietnam wars.

== Early life ==
Romano was born in Madera, California, one of nine children of an Italian immigrant shoemaker. According to Romano, his father played violin and guitar, and the entire family was musical. He said, "In our family, if you didn't sing, you didn't eat."

In his youth, he played violin but took up the guitar after being inspired by Eddie Lang. At 17, Romano moved to Hollywood where he studied guitar with Paramount Studio's guitarist George Smith.

== Career ==
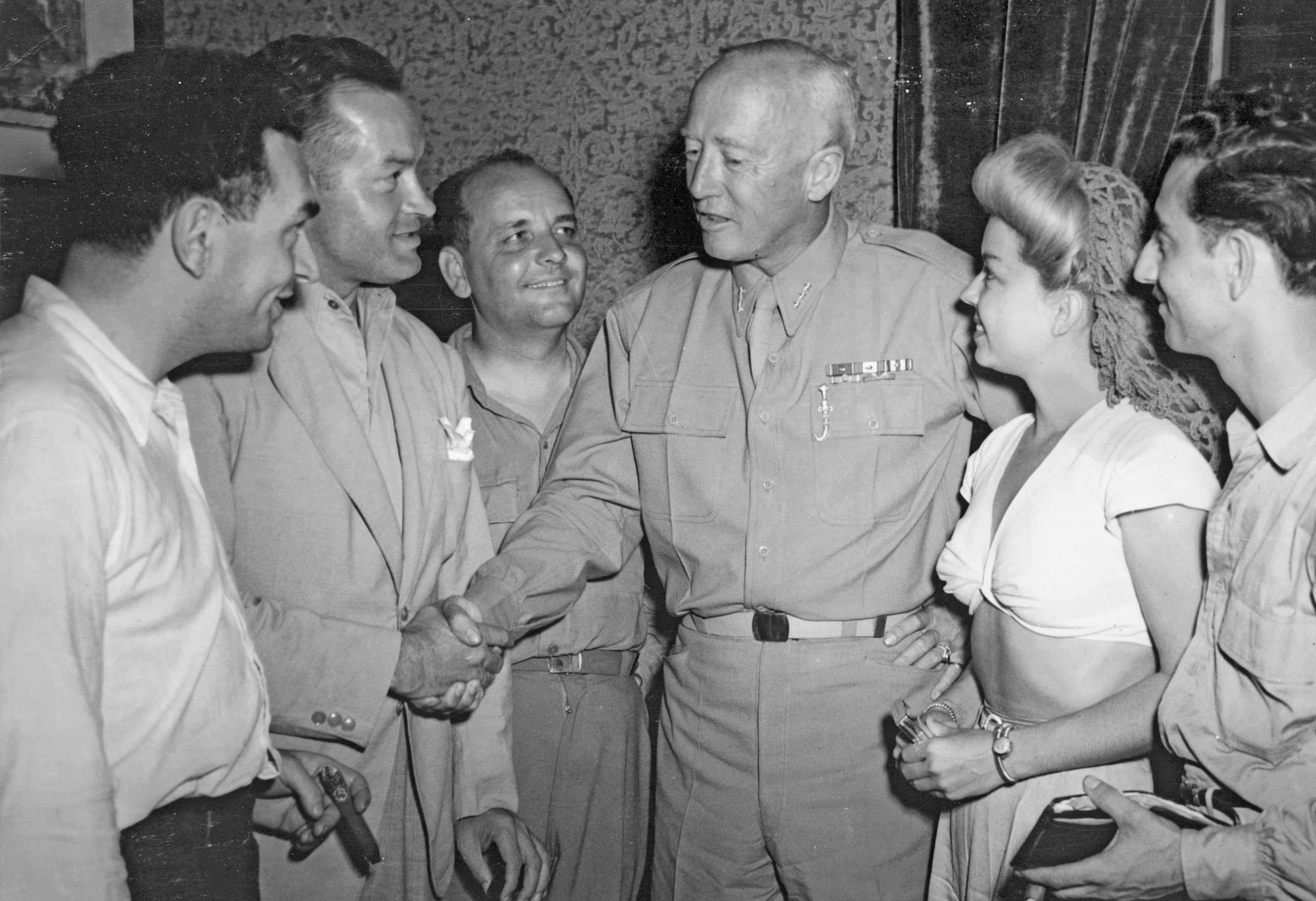
Romano (right) with Hal Block, Bob Hope, Barney Dean, George Patton and Frances Langford during World War II

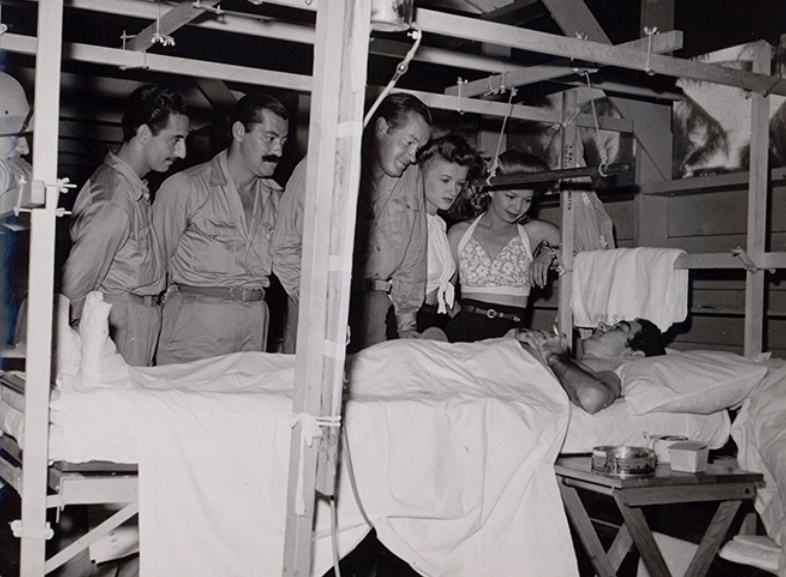
Bob Hope and his 1944 USO troupe visiting a hospital ward in the South Pacific (from left) Tony Romano, Jerry Colonna, Bob Hope, Patty Thomas, and Frances Langford.

Romano built his career as a guitarist and singer for radio programs and Hollywood movie productions in the 1930s. He first worked on the Al Pearce radio program, then at Warner Brothers, where he composed arrangements for Dick Powell. Romano's 16-piece orchestra was the feature band for Morey Amsterdam and Mabel Todd's radio show. He also worked on the Lucky Strike Hit Parade, at 20th Century Fox and later on the Pepsodent radio show for NBC.

In September 1942, Bob Hope asked Romano to accompany him on his initial USO tour to entertain troops at bases in Alaska and the Aleutians. Hope had already enlisted singer Frances Langford and comedian Jerry Colonna but needed a musician and asked Colonna for a recommendation. Colonna said, "Get Tony Romano. Best guitar in the business."

The foursome of Hope, Langford, comedian Jack Pepper and Romano performed in England, Sicily, North Africa and the South Pacific during World War II. They also toured in 1948 during the Berlin Airlift and in Korea in the 1950s. During the Vietnam War, Romano accompanied Langford without Hope on USO circuit tours in Southeast Asia.

In between USO tours, Romano performed on several programs, including the Jack Carson radio show and recorded his own music (his recording Stars Fell on Alabama was a hit in 1956) as well as arranged songs for Johnny Mercer, Bing Crosby and others.

He made Purple Heart Diary a 1951 film based on his experiences alongside Frances Langford and Ben Lessy with the trio playing themselves.

== Personal life ==
Romano was married to singer/actress Barbara Hayden. They had two children, Richard Niles and Lisa Hayden-Miller. Romano was married to Evelyn Collette from 1964 until his death in 2005. They had one child Regina Marie Romano Deese.
