= Windsor Bridge (New South Wales) =

Bridge in Sydney, New South Wales, Australia

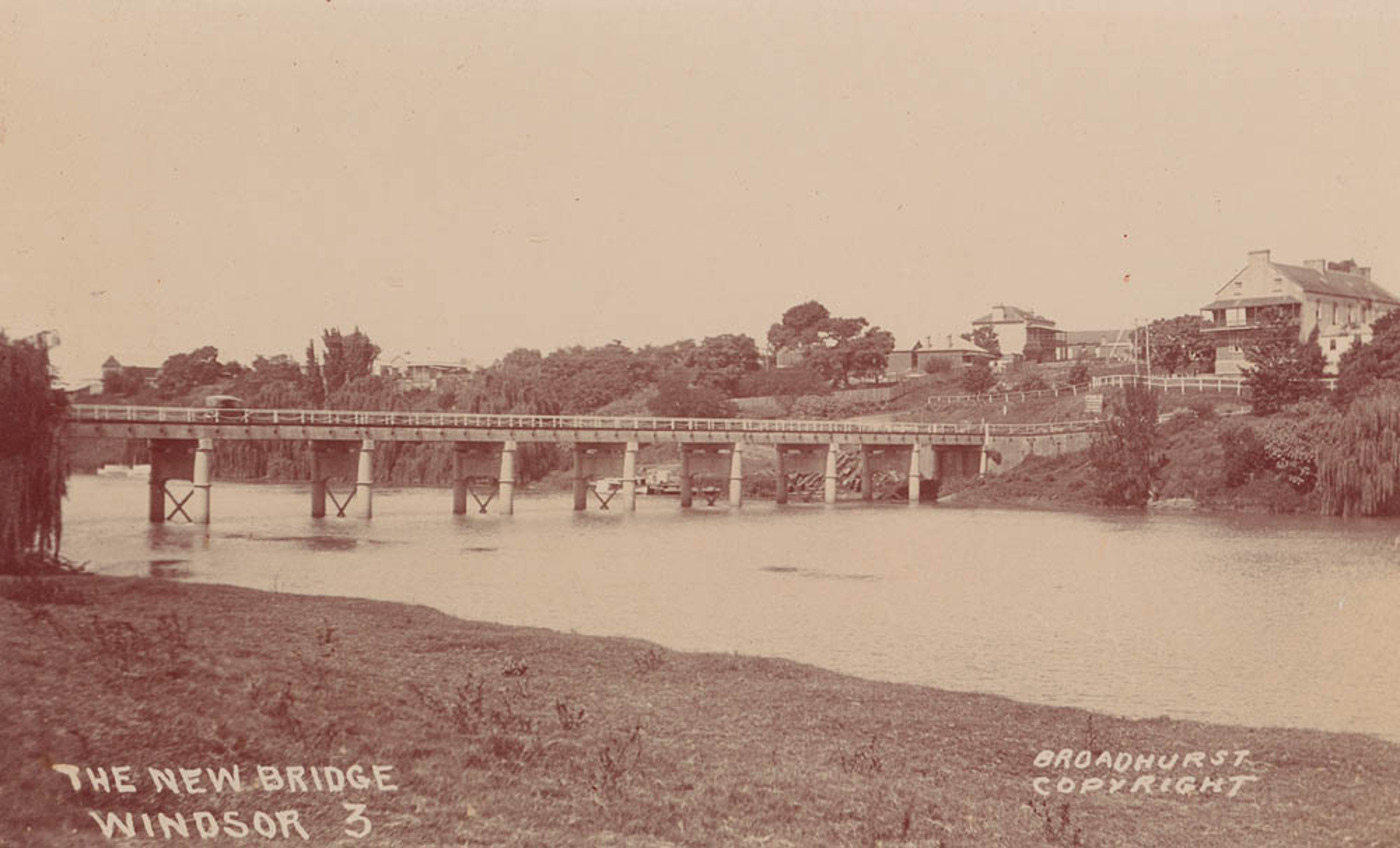
- The Windsor Bridge on a 1900s postcard
- Coordinates: 33°36′12″S 150°49′20″E
- Carries: Windsor Road
- Crosses: Hawkesbury River
- Locale: Windsor, New South Wales, Australia
- Other name(s): Hawkesbury River Bridge, Windsor
- Owner: Transport for NSW

Characteristics
- Design: Beam bridge
- Total length: 155 metres (509 ft)
- No. of spans: 11

History
- Designer: Public Works Department
- Constructed by: Turnbull & Dixon
- Construction end: 1874
- Construction cost: £10,283
- Opened: 24 August 1874
- Closed: 18 May 2020

Statistics
- Daily traffic: 19,000 (2013)

Location
- Interactive map of Windsor Bridge

The Windsor Bridge, officially the Hawkesbury River Bridge, Windsor, was a beam bridge across the Hawkesbury River, located in Windsor, New South Wales, Australia. The bridge was built in 1874. On 18 May 2020, a replacement bridge was opened to traffic.

The original bridge was dismantled between October 2020 and March 2021, with the southernmost span and northern abutment repurposed into viewing platforms.

== History ==
The Windsor Bridge was a significant contributor to the early economic contributions of the Hawkesbury and Central West regions, and more than 20,000 vehicles per day still use this crossing, its engineering significance in having stood the test of time and flood is obvious. The area is also noted to contain an early wharf.

The area leading to Windsor Bridge is called Thompson Square. Established in 1795 as the government domain and military precinct of the Hawkesbury outpost settlement, early convict-built clay brick drains that have been the subject of Hawkesbury historical knowledge since 1814 are extant. Many old-time local residents have spoken of traversing the 1814 convict built brick barrel drains in years gone by. With the Windsor Bridge Replacement Project underway, this significant and complex network of a potentially unique colonial drainage system has had significant portions removed within the project area. These drains have been exposed, some removed. A number of drains have been protected by encasing within polystyrene under a two-storey-high concrete bridge abutment during construction.

== Heritage listing ==
The Windsor Bridge was listed on the heritage and conservation register of the Roads & Maritime Services.

The Windsor Bridge has a high level of historic, technical, aesthetic and social significance as an important historical and physical landmark in one of the State's pre-eminent historic towns, and in the wider Sydney region. It is the oldest extant crossing of the Hawkesbury River. Together with the successive crossings upstream at Richmond, this bridge has played a major role in shaping the history of the Hawkesbury area, functioning for well over a century as an all important link between the communities on either side of the River and as an essential component in a through route of importance in the development of the Sydney region. The series of major alterations to the structure since its construction articulate the continuing difficulties of negotiating a crossing of this major waterway with its frequent floods, however the bridge and its original piers have withstood the test of time. The Windsor Bridge has landmark qualities as one of only two bridge crossings of the Hawkesbury River in the Hawkesbury area and as such it defines the surrounding network of roads. It is a large structure, and although simple in appearance, impressive. The bridge represents a major engineering project in the State for its time. The iron caissons were cast at Mort's Dock in Balmain, using iron from the first short-lived iron mine in Australia (Fitzroy Mine). They are lined with specially engineered and made bricks, then filled with concrete. The base of the main piers are the same ones sunk into the bedrock below the riverbed using pneumatic caissons in 1874. The addition of a reinforced concrete beam deck to replace the timber deck in the 1920s is a relatively early use of this technology. The river and this crossing of it has defined the life of several generations of local inhabitants on both sides of the River. As the suburban outskirts of Sydney widen and come closer to the still distinct and distinctive Macquarie towns, the rich history of the area and its physical remains become increasingly important to the community's sense of identity. The Windsor Bridge is thus an important part of Windsor's history and identity.

— Statement of significance, Heritage and conservation register, Roads & Maritime Services, 21 October 2004.

== Replacement ==
In 2008 the bridge condition was assessed by the Roads & Traffic Authority and found to be in poor condition. In December 2013, the Government of New South Wales gave planning approval to the construction of a new bridge to replace the existing 1874 Windsor Bridge that, due to safety reasons, have been disputed. The old bridge is to be demolished after the new bridge opens. Roads & Maritime Services proposed to construct the new bridge 35 metres (115 ft) downstream from the existing bridge. The approach road to the new bridge is proposed to be built along one side of the Thompson Square, Australia's oldest public square on a currently existing road. The new bridge proposal is objected to by in excess of 45,000 people, on the grounds that it will keep and increase heavy traffic in a historic town centre, and destroys the town's character and heritage. Some who favour the proposal claim the new bridge would greatly reduce traffic congestion in the area, in direct contradiction to quite a number of government traffic studies and documents. In October 2015, a legal challenge to stop the new bridge failed.

According to Roads & Maritime Services, the replacement three-lane bridge was expected to provide insignificant improvements in traffic flow and flood mitigation. Some local residents speculate that a reason for the proposed bridge replacement was sand extraction on the Richmond Lowlands facilitated by the new bridge with wider spaced pylons and a slight height increases to allow barges to pass underneath. Documents show that there was "high level political interference in the planning approval process" and that the Department of Planning changed from opposing the project to supporting it in less than a month following the political interference. In a submission to a NSW Legislative Council inquiry, it is speculated that the disclosed political interference was largely orchestrated by Bart Bassett, a former Member for Hawkesbury and a former Mayor of the City of Hawkesbury, who was Mayor of Hawkesbury at the time the high level political interference occurred and who was found to have illegally solicited political donations from Buildev in 2010. In 2014 he was asked to step down or face expulsion amid the corruption allegations that were being investigated by the ICAC.

On 18 May 2020, the replacement bridge built by Georgiou Group was opened to traffic.

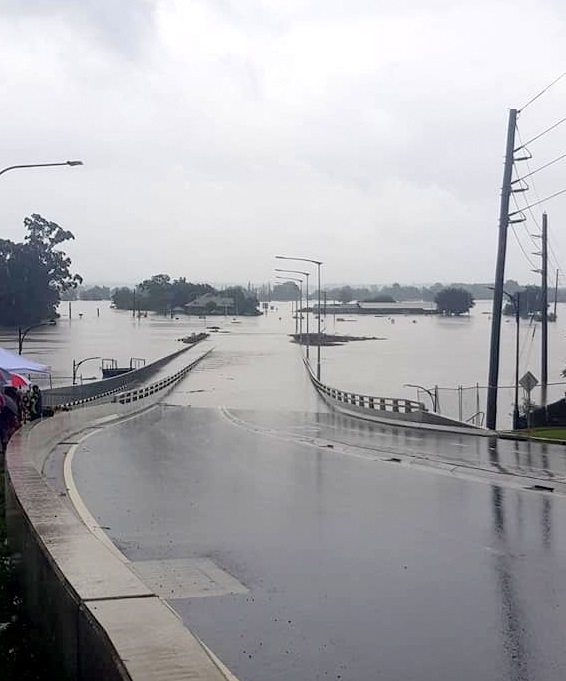
Windsor Bridge submerged

In March 2021, the bridge was submerged along with other areas, during the 2021 Eastern Australia floods.

In March 2022 the bridge was again flooded during the 2022 Eastern Australia floods, and once again during a major flood event in July 2022.
