= Laurieton School of Arts =

- Location within New South Wales Location within Australia
- 31.6520°S 152.7963°E
- Location: Cnr Laurie and Bold Streets, Laurieton, Port Macquarie-Hastings Council, New South Wales, Australia

History
- Built: 1911–1912

Site notes
- Architect(s): Jas H. Bolster; Concord Sydney
- Owner: Port Macquarie-Hastings Council

New South Wales Heritage Register
- Official name: Laurieton School of Arts
- Type: state heritage (built)
- Designated: 2 April 1999
- Reference no.: 476
- Type: School of Arts
- Category: Community Facilities
- Builders: E. Bacon, Taree

Laurieton School of Arts is a heritage-listed school of arts, now used as a community hall and neighbourhood centre, at the corner of Laurie and Bold Streets, Laurieton, Port Macquarie-Hastings Council, New South Wales, Australia. It was designed by Sydney architect James H. Bolster and built from 1911 to 1912 by Taree contractor E. Bacon. The property is owned by Port Macquarie-Hastings Council. It was added to the New South Wales State Heritage Register on 2 April 1999.

== History ==
The current School of Arts is the third to be built in Laurieton. The first was blown down in a gale on 5 May 1898, while the second opened on 7 September 1898 and burned down on 30 August 1910.

By 1910 Laurieton had a population of between 700 and 800 people, a school of approximately 160 children, an Anglican church 1899 (still surviving and opposite the School of Arts), a Catholic church 1898, a number of timber mills, a hotel 1900 and a number of stores along Laurie Street.

Less than a month after the previous building burnt down the foundation stone for the current School of Arts building was laid on 20 May 1911 by Alec Thomson, secretary of the committee as a small compliment in appreciation of his service, and it was opened five months later on 8 September. The architect was James H. Bolster of Concord, Sydney. The 1911 building remains standing today with little change.

Accounts from the time of its opening describe the new building "as a palatial structure" and one of the finest Schools of Arts north of Newcastle. It is described as having a 72 feet x 32 feet hall with glass skylight in the ceiling with provisions for a library reading room, billiard room and several other rooms.

The hardwood timber framing and red mahogany internal lining and weatherboards were provided by Robert Longworth's mill at Laurieton. Longworth was the President of the School of Arts, one of the guarantors for the construction bank loan, and described as a "guiding force behind the project".

In 1916 the memorial trees were planted around the School of Arts. In 1915 the train line was completed to Wauchope, marking a major change of transport method for the region and possibly the growth of Kendall and Wauchope, rather than Laurieton. This slow growth undoubtedly reduced the need for major change in the School of Arts building and allowed its existing rooms to be adapted with little alteration, right up to the present date.

Schools of Arts (which arose as "mechanics' institutes" in Britain around 1800) from the 1920s to the 1950s continued to often be the major entertainment and cultural focus and in Laurieton the School of Arts typically played a major role in the life of the community until the 1960s. Pictures were shown in the hall since 1918 and the travelling picture show was replaced in 1947 with a twice a week program. The projection box was placed on top of the entrance. Cinemascope was introduced in 1957 and in 1959 films ceased when the Laurieton Plaza was opened. In August 1944 Bob Hope held a concert in the School of Arts after his Catalina flying boat lost power and crash landed in the Camden Haven Inlet. In 1955 Chips Rafferty visited the School of Arts hall to attend a screening of his latest film.

Many of the current members of Camden Haven Historical Society have vivid memories of the wide and varied use of the hall, particularly in the 1950s and 1960s. There were balls, juvenile dances for the teenagers, amateur vaudeville shows, tap dancing, Slim Dusty travelling shows, political meetings, bingo and card nights. The use of the hall was such that the flooring had been sanded down to joints and had to be replaced in the 1980s.

The pictures were run by Bruce Longworth on behalf of Peter Hatsatouris of Port Macquarie up until the building of the Plaza Cinema in 1959. In 1954 an ex-serviceman, Alfred Baker, started a hairdressing salon in the service verandah and took over as manager of the billiard room. He and his patrons played much billiards, and the hairdresser was also likely to have been a bookie. It is likely the kitchen was modified at this time, including an outside door.

In 1956 the billiards stopped and the room was leased to the Country Women's Association (CWA) who occupied the room until 1980.

The Laurieton Returned Servicemen's Club was established in the 1950s and by 1960 television had arrived in the town. The society began to change and patronage of the Hall dropped off. In addition, in about 1957 the myriad of small local mills that had previously existed ceased trading, all of them bought out by one mill. In 1965 the exterior of the building was re-painted. The library and reading room continued to be the town's library, run voluntarily, until 1981. In the late 1970s the building transferred from the Department of Education to the Department of Sports and Recreation.

In 1996 the entrance partition with ticket office was removed and put understage. Between 1971 and 1980 the main function of the School of Arts building, apart from the CWA and some patronage of the hall, was as a library. Sylvia Longworth was volunteer librarian from 1948 to 1971. In 1975 the library expanded into the reading room, and in 1978 into the supper room and also into the entry hall.

By 1980 there were 31,790 books with a membership of 913. The Hastings Council took over the management of the building in 1981 and, in addition, opened a local office in the old billiard room. In 1981 the Hastings Council also took over the library and after this time the librarian was paid. In 1992 the library moved into new premises in Laurieton. Renovation and restoration work carried out in the 1980s included replacing hall doors, replacing of all roofs and gutters, repair of cladding and fascias, repair or replacement of windows.

== Description ==
The School of Arts building has a timber frame with framed with painted timber weatherboard cladding, eaves lining and casement windows, and a galvanised iron roof with dutch gables. The hall has an entry porch off Laurie Street and the rest of the rooms are at a lower level with library and billiard room entry from Bold Street.

The building retains its original rooms and layout, including a large hall with stage and two dressing rooms, a supper room with kitchen and servery, a billiard room, a library and separate reading room and central corridor. All rooms were internally connected via the hallway, with the exception of the Billiard Room, and could be used collectively or separately.

The building has a high degree of integrity. Both exterior and interior fabric have undergone only minor changes and some of this is capable of being reversed. There have been no additions to the building. It stands remarkably intact and similar to when it was opened in 1911.

=== Modifications and dates ===
- 1919: Concrete steps added between billiard room and entry hall.
- 1954: Service verandah leased to hairdresser; new external door and window; closed off door and window to servery.
- 1956: Billiard room closed down and room leased to CWA until 1980; billiard lights removed.
- 1965: External cladding painted; concrete replaced timber decking to verandah.
- 1975: Library relocated into reading room and later (1978) into supper room. New door to verandah and sliding door between two rooms added.
- 1981: Hastings Council took over management. Renovation and restoration carried out; included a new roof, gutters, and box gutter. Repair and painting of cladding. New windows to billiard room and west windows of Hall. Blocking off of Hallway from Hall.
- 1996: Entrance partition and ticket window removed from hall and stored under stage.

== Heritage listing ==
Laurieton School of Arts is a single storey timber building constructed in 1911 of State heritage significance. It is a rare and remarkably intact School of Arts conjoined with Supper Room, Servery and Kitchen, Billiard Room Library and Reading Room. It shows the optimum development of its type in NSW and the importance of associated with School of Arts in NSW. Its all timber construction, weatherboard joinery and timber lining demonstrate typical pre-World War I building standards, materials and methods. It has strong associations with the cultural life of Laurieton in the first half of the twentieth century.

Laurieton School of Arts was listed on the New South Wales State Heritage Register on 2 April 1999 having satisfied the following criteria.

The place is important in demonstrating the course, or pattern, of cultural or natural history in New South Wales.

It represents the optimal development of a School of Arts in New South Wales. The building contains not only the original hall facilities with kitchen and servery but also an integrated library, reading room, and a billiard room.

It illustrates the importance associated with Schools of Arts in the early twentieth century in New South Wales.

Its intact timber-lined interiors demonstrate typical early 20th century School of Arts taste and customs.

It is also one of only a handful of surviving buildings in Laurieton which are associated with the hard wood timber industry on the Camden Haven Inlet.

The place has a strong or special association with a person, or group of persons, of importance of cultural or natural history of New South Wales's history.

The building has a fleeting but memorable local association with Bob Hope, the American entertainer.

It also has a local historical association with many of the early families of Laurieton.

The place is important in demonstrating aesthetic characteristics and/or a high degree of creative or technical achievement in New South Wales.

The Laurieton School of Arts is a well-designed and representative communal building in the Federation style. It demonstrates the high standards of once common timber building, design and construction in the early twentieth century in New South Wales.

The rare intact 1911 interior demonstrates the culmination of traditional timber board lining and detail in New South Wales.

The aesthetic significance is enhanced by the presence of original timber stools, a table, and the hall ticket partition.

It is a landmark building, located on a prominent corner of the town, with other surviving early timber buildings nearby.

The place has strong or special association with a particular community or cultural group in New South Wales for social, cultural or spiritual reasons.

The building played the major role in the social and educational life of Laurieton town from 1911 until the 1950s. It served as the town's library until the 1970s, the town's cinema from 1912 until the 1950s, and there is a wealth of evidence relating to the use of the hall for a wide range of community activities until the early 1960s and it has a high community use today.

It is held in high regard by the Laurieton community, as a reminder of their past, in its association with a number of local families and as the hub of entertainment until the 1950s. This is demonstrated by the town's celebration of the building's Diamond Jubilee in 1971.

The place has potential to yield information that will contribute to an understanding of the cultural or natural history of New South Wales.

The building provides valuable evidence of typical timber construction techniques at the beginning of the 20th century. This includes tenon and mortar joints, typical timber and steel truss roof and typical single span and collar beam roof construction.

The place possesses uncommon, rare or endangered aspects of the cultural or natural history of New South Wales.

The Laurieton School of Arts building is a rare example of a sophisticated School of Arts building in New South Wales. Its intact timber lined interiors are a rare example of the culmination of this traditional style and construction. This includes timber lined kitchen still being used for this use.

The place is important in demonstrating the principal characteristics of a class of cultural or natural places/environments in New South Wales.

The building's high standard of timber detail designs and construction is representative of a once common skill in timber towns on the North Coast of New South Wales. The building is a representative Federation style. The Hall stage and Dressing Rooms are typical School of Arts design in New South Wales at the turn of the century.
