= Hannam Vale, New South Wales =

Hannam Vale New South Wales
- General store at Hannam Vale

- Coordinates: 31°43′S 152°36′E
- Population: 218 (2021 census)
- Elevation: 64 m (210 ft)
- Location: 344 km (214 mi) NNE of Sydney; 204 km (127 mi) NE of Newcastle; 42 km (26 mi) NNE of Taree; 56 km (35 mi) SW of Port Macquarie
- LGA(s): Mid-Coast Council
- State electorate(s): Port Macquarie
- Federal division(s): Lyne
Localities around Hannam Vale:
Kerewong	Lorne	Upsalls Creek
Waitui	Hannam Vale	Stewarts River
Lansdowne	Lansdowne Forest	Moorland

Hannam Vale is a small village located in a forestry and dairy farming area on the Mid North Coast, about 26 miles (42 km) North-East of Taree in New South Wales, Australia.

== History ==
Thirty years after the penal colony was established at Sydney, John Oxley, the colony's surveyor-general surveyed the Hastings and Manning River valleys for settlement. Soon after, woodcutters in search of the highly prized red cedar, pushed into the Stewarts River valley and the densely wooded valley that subsequently become known as Hannam Vale.

The first recorded selection of land was by Thomas Crossingham in the Stewarts River area in 1866. G.A Scott chose a block of 40 acres (160,000 m^{2}) in 1873, but was unable to complete the purchase, so the block was regazetted in 1886 and purchased by J. H. Lambert. The first permanent settler in the valley was John Haydon who purchased 50 acres (200,000 m^{2}) along the Stewarts River in 1882. Haydon's son Bill became known locally as the 'Cedar King'. He was the first woodcutter to use a truck as a hauler during the 1930s.

Other settlers followed the woodcutters into the valley, clearing land for growing crops such as maize, arrowroot, potatoes and vegetables. Most of the early settlers also planted a variety of fruit trees, especially oranges, and kept cattle for dairy farming. By the mid-1930s, dairy farming and logging had become the principal activities in the larger Hannam Vale area of Stewarts River, Hannam Vale and Waitui.

Hannam Vale was given its name by Francis Redman, who operated the post office. When he found that the name "Upper Stewarts River" was too long to fit on the mail stamp, he used his farm's name, "Hannam Vale", instead. Redman was also instrumental in having the Hannam Vale School's first teacher appointed by providing a residence on his property. Redman's son subsequently provided a half acre block of land on which the Hannam Vale Community Hall was erected.

The primary school was first established as a one-teacher "provisional" school in 1892. It was afforded permanent status and its original buildings erected in 1907; since then a number of other buildings have been added. Most recently, the Anglican Church in Hannam Vale was donated to the School and is now used as a school hall.

== Present day ==
As dairy farming has become less lucrative, so more people have begun to use the valley purely for residential purposes, either working close by, or commuting to jobs in the nearby towns of Taree and Port Macquarie. More recently, following deregulation of the dairy industry in 2001, a number of the older dairy farms have ceased to operate; this has been closely associated with growing numbers of city-based people purchasing smaller lots for recreational farming, as well as the establishment of bed and breakfast accommodation in the area. The region's high rainfall and dairy farming legacy, along with associated planting of grasses such as kikuyu, is the reason for the present day lush-green landscape.

The epicentre of Hannam Vale is the junction of Hannam Vale Road and Deep Creek Road, ten minutes from the Pacific Highway at either John's River or Moorland. The most prominent features of this area are the public school, general store, Salvation Army chapel and community centre. Opposite the Public School is the Hannam Vale General Store. Built in 1914, the store is a social centre of the wider Hannam Vale area.

Just east of the Public School is the Rural Fire Service Brigade Shed and further east again, off Hannam Vale Road, is the entrance way to the Hannam Vale Recreational Reserve. Just two to three hundred metres to the north-west of the School on Hannam Vale Road is the Hannam Vale Community Hall, the home of community meetings in the area, as well as special events such as dances, art exhibitions and fundraising activity.

Around the corner from the Public School in Deep Creek Road is the original (1914) Salvation Army Chapel and newer (2002) larger Church Hall.

Present day farming activities include beef cattle, small-scale dairying, and macadamia nuts. Commercial forestry also continues, with the Lansdowne State Forest bordering the village.

Several national parks border the area. In particular, Coorabakh National Park has waterfalls, and panoramic views from lookouts such Flat Top Rock, Vincent's and Newby's lookouts.
