= Camden Haven =

- Region
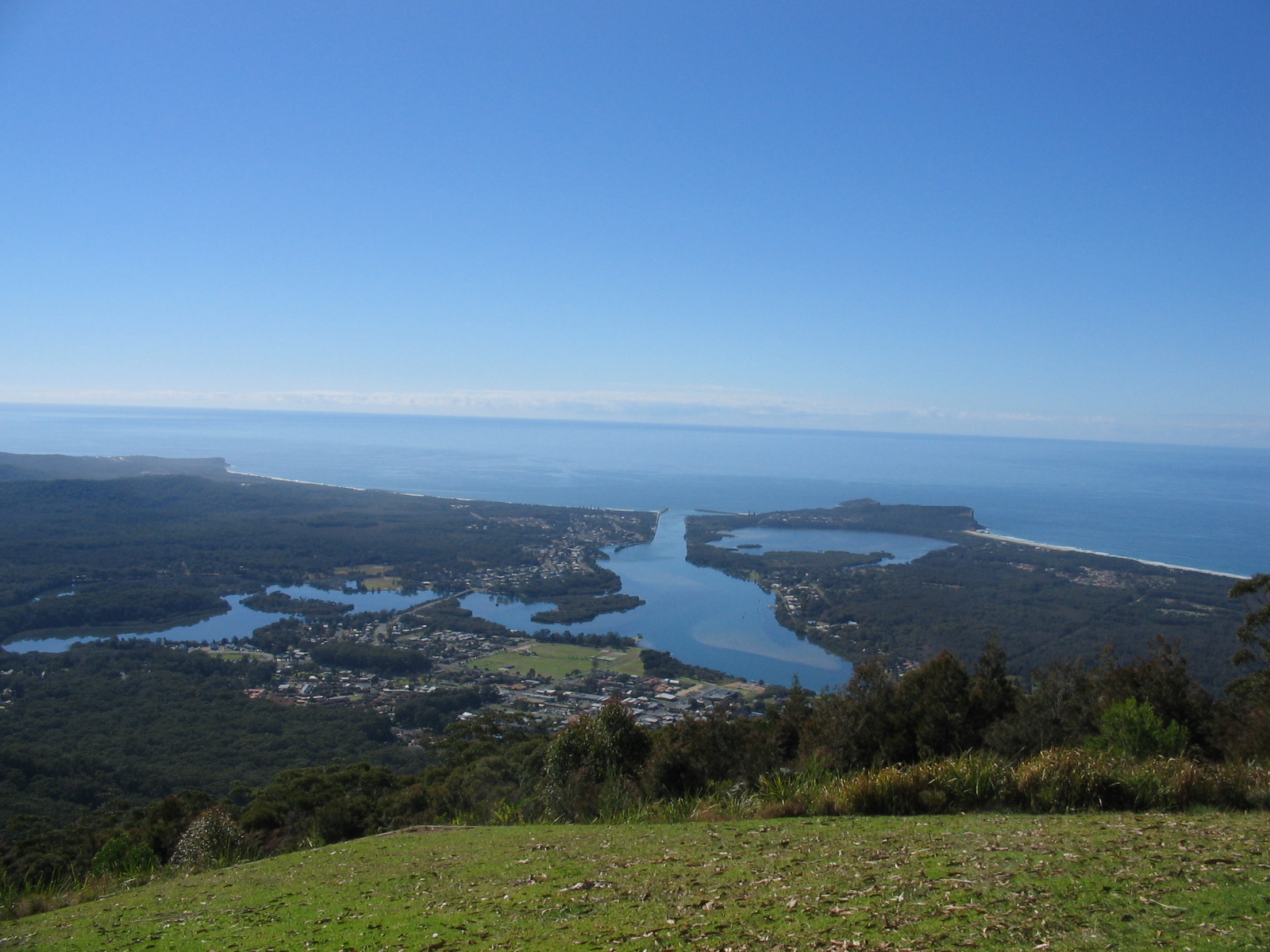
- Camden Haven from North Brother mountain. The town of Laurieton is in the foreground.

- Coordinates: 31.647°S 152.809°E
- Country: Australia
- State: New South Wales
- LGAs: Port Macquarie-Hastings Council; MidCoast Council

Government
  - State electorate: Port Macquarie
  - Federal division: Lyne

Population
  - Totals: 8,037 (2021 census); 17,835 (2018)

Camden Haven (sometimes preceded by a definite article) is a parish in the Mid North Coast region of New South Wales, Australia, approximately 30 km south of the major regional centre of Port Macquarie. The harbour is located where the Camden Haven River empties into the Tasman Sea.

The Birpai (also known as Birrbay) people have lived in this area for more than 40,000 years.

Camden Haven is also the name given to a group of settlements located on the shores of Camden Haven and in the rural hinterland. Laurieton, located on the harbour's western shore, is the largest town and the commercial centre for the Camden Haven district.

Other communities in the immediate vicinity of the harbour include North Haven and Dunbogan. Lakewood is a new residential area west of Laurieton, while further inland are the villages of Kew on the Pacific Highway and Kendall on the North Coast railway line. The estimated urban population of this broader area was 17,835 at June 2018.

The Camden Haven region is bordered on the west by the Comboyne plateau. The district consists of fertile, well-watered valleys punctuated by several large igneous mountain formations (once thought to be volcanoes), notably the Three Brothers. The region's economy is based on tourism, fisheries, forestry and oyster farming.

Historical population
Year	Pop.	±%
1966	1,448	—
1971	1,631	+12.6%
1976	2,168	+32.9%
1981	3,161	+45.8%
1986	3,524	+11.5%
1991	4,384	+24.4%
1996	5,823	+32.8%
2001	6,460	+10.9%
2006	6,891	+6.7%
2011	7,177	+4.2%
2016	7,532	+4.9%
2021	8,037	+6.7%
Source: Australian Bureau of Statistics data.
