= Big Nellie Mountain =

Mountain in New South Wales, Australia

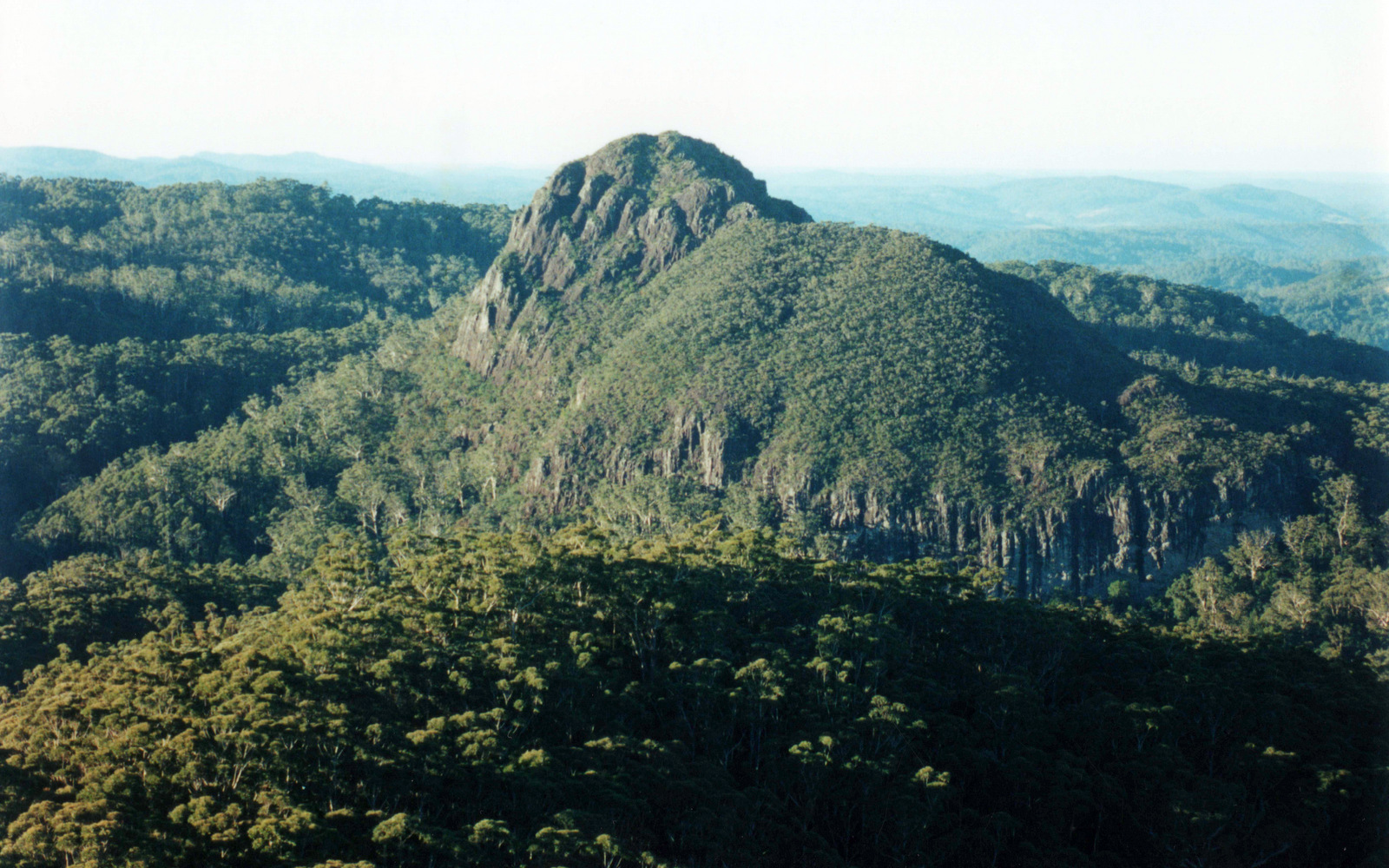
- Big Nellie Mountain, photographed from Little Nellie Mountain

Highest point
- Elevation: 542 m (1,778 ft); AHD
- Coordinates: 31°42′02″S 152°31′20″E

Geography
- Location within New South Wales
- Location: Taree, New South Wales, New South Wales, Australia

Geology
- Rock age: Miocene
- Mountain type: Rhyolite or Trachyte

Big Nellie Mountain is a volcanic plug in the Mid North Coast region of New South Wales, Australia. It is situated 272 kilometres (169 mi) northeast of Sydney, within Coorabakh National Park.

== See also ==
- List of mountains in Australia § New South Wales
