= Coorabakh National Park =

National park in Australia

- IUCN category II (national park)
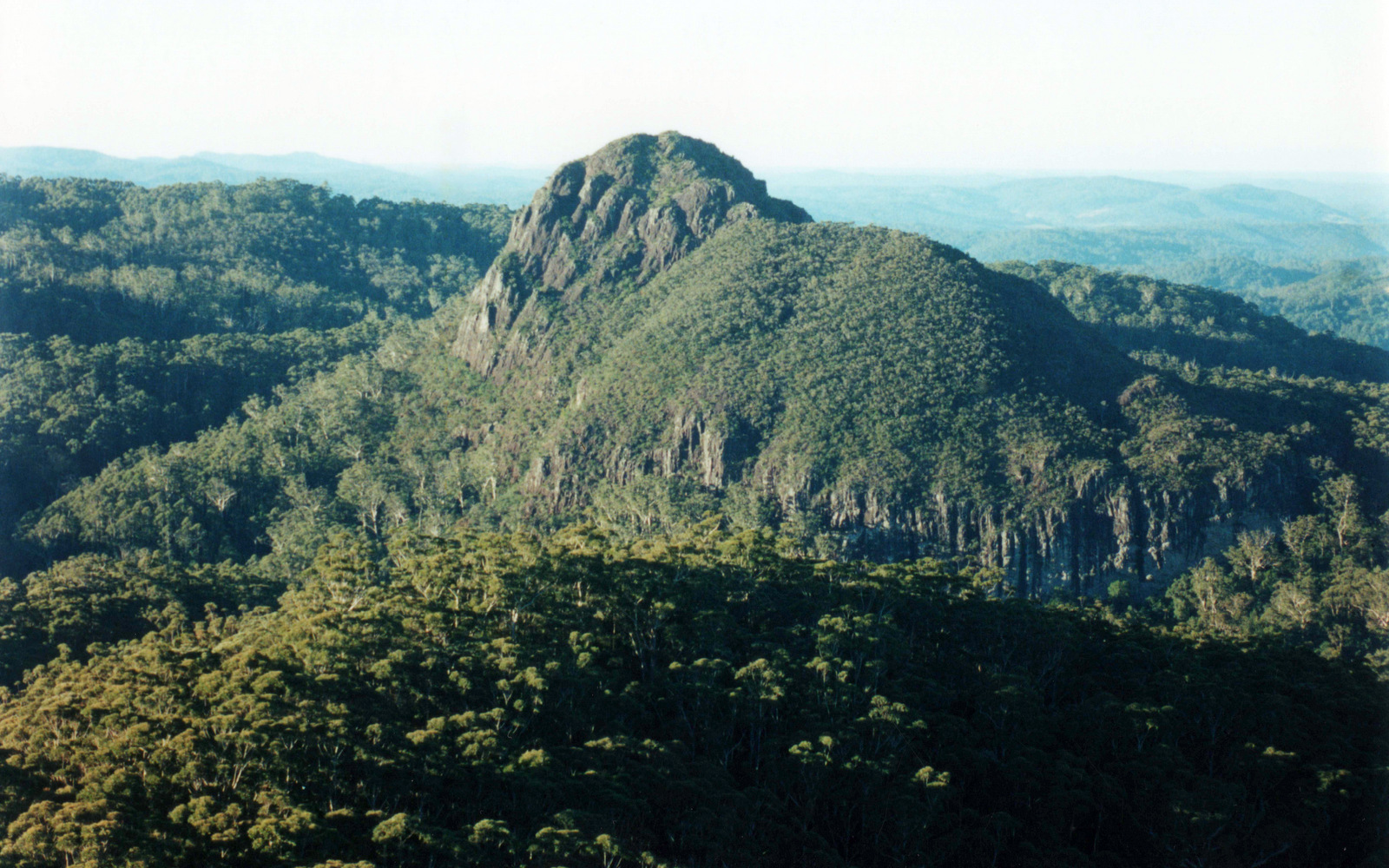
- Big Nellie Mountain, photographed from Little Nellie Mountain

- Location within New South Wales
- Location: New South Wales
- Nearest city: Taree
- Coordinates: 31°42′44″S 152°31′21″E
- Area: 18 km^{2} (6.9 sq mi)
- Established: 1 January 1999
- Governing body: National Parks and Wildlife Service (New South Wales)
- Website: https://www.nationalparks.nsw.gov.au/visit-a-park/parks/coorabakh-national-park

Coorabakh is a national park located near Hannam Vale in New South Wales, Australia, 272 kilometres (169 mi) northeast of Sydney.

Three volcanic outcrops known as Big Nellie (31°42′2″S 152°31′20″E), Flat Nellie (31°42′39″S 152°30′37″E) and Little Nellie (31°41′40″S 152°30′3″E) dominate the park.

The park is covered in tall eucalypt forest and shrubs on the exposed Lansdowne escarpment, while warm temperate and subtropical rainforest can be found in more protected areas. Endangered species such as the spotted-tailed quoll, powerful owl and stuttering frog can be found in the area.

Newbys Cave can be reached by following Newbys Creek from the carpark, while Newbys Lookout offers picnic facilities and panoramic views of the Manning River valley. Flat Rock Lookout (31°41′17″S 152°30′23″E) overlooks the upper Lansdowne Valley and Comboyne Plateau escarpment. Starrs Creek picnic area has a rainforest viewing platform.

The park borders the Lansdowne State Forest.

Before the arrival of the Europeans, this area belonged to the Ngaamba people.

== See also ==
- Protected areas of New South Wales
- Coopernook, New South Wales
