= Three Brothers (New South Wales) =

Mountains in New South Wales, Australia

Middle Brother
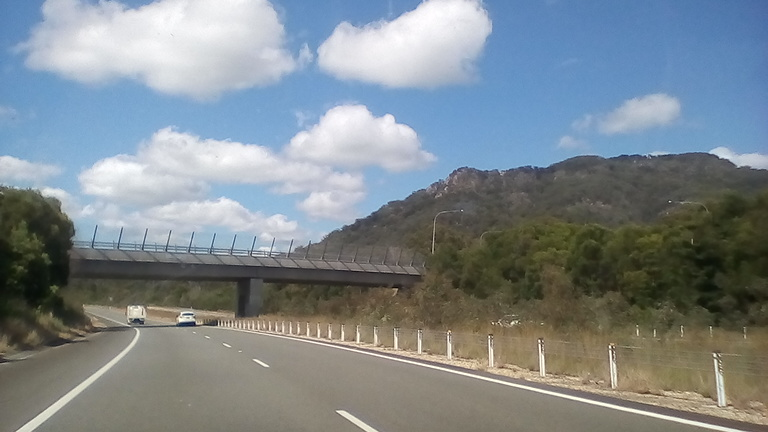
- South Brother 2018

Highest point
- Elevation: 554 m (1,818 ft)
- Coordinates: 31°42′07″S 152°40′41″E

Geography
- Location within New South Wales
- Location: Mid North Coast, New South Wales, Australia

Three Brothers, three separate mountains of the Mid North Coast region of New South Wales, Australia, are situated approximately 360 kilometres (220 mi) north of Sydney.

== Location and features ==
Collectively referred to as the Three Brothers, the mountains are three separate mountains named and located as follows:

- North Brother: with an elevation of 476 metres (1,562 ft) AHD 31.642°S 152.802°E
- Middle Brother: with an elevation of 554 metres (1,818 ft) AHD 31.702°S 152.678°E
- South Brother: with an elevation of 487 metres (1,598 ft) AHD 31.745°S 152.674°E

The South Brother lies within the Mid-Coast Council local government area; while the Middle and North Brothers are located with the Port Macquarie-Hastings Council area,

The North and Middle Brothers have been declared national parks, named Dooragan National Park and Middle Brother National Park respectively.

The main radio and television transmitters for the Mid North Coast region are located on the summit of Middle Brother.

== Etymology ==
The Australian Aboriginal local Birpai people tell a dreamtime story of three brothers who were killed by a witch called Widjirriejuggi and were buried where the mountains stand. The youngest of the three was Dooragan, that now carries the name for one of the national parks.

Coincidentally, when Captain James Cook passed the area on 12 May 1770, he also named the mountains Three Brothers, since "these Hills bore some resemblance to each other". During his apprenticeship with John and Henry Walker, ship owners of Whitby, the second ship Cook served on was named Three Brothers.
