= Dunbogan =

Dunbogan Camden Haven, New South Wales
- Coordinates: 31°38′54″S 152°49′4″E
- Population: 1,020 (SAL 2021)
- Postcode(s): 2443
- Elevation: 11 m (36 ft)
- LGA(s): Port Macquarie-Hastings Council
- County: Macquarie
- State electorate(s): Port Macquarie
- Federal division(s): Lyne

Dunbogan is a town in New South Wales, Australia. At the 2021 census, it had a population of 1,020.
