= Lorne, New South Wales =

Lorne Camden Haven, New South Wales
- Coordinates: 31.65756°S 152.59167°E
- Population: 277 (SAL 2021)
- Postcode(s): 2439
- LGA(s): Port Macquarie-Hastings Council
- State electorate(s): Port Macquarie
- Federal division(s): Lyne

Lorne is a rural village in New South Wales, Australia. It is located in the hills of the Camden Haven region on Mount Comboyne.

There is a New South Wales Rural Fire Service (NSW RFS) in Lorne.
