= Crowdy Bay National Park =

National park in New South Wales, Australia

- IUCN category II (national park)
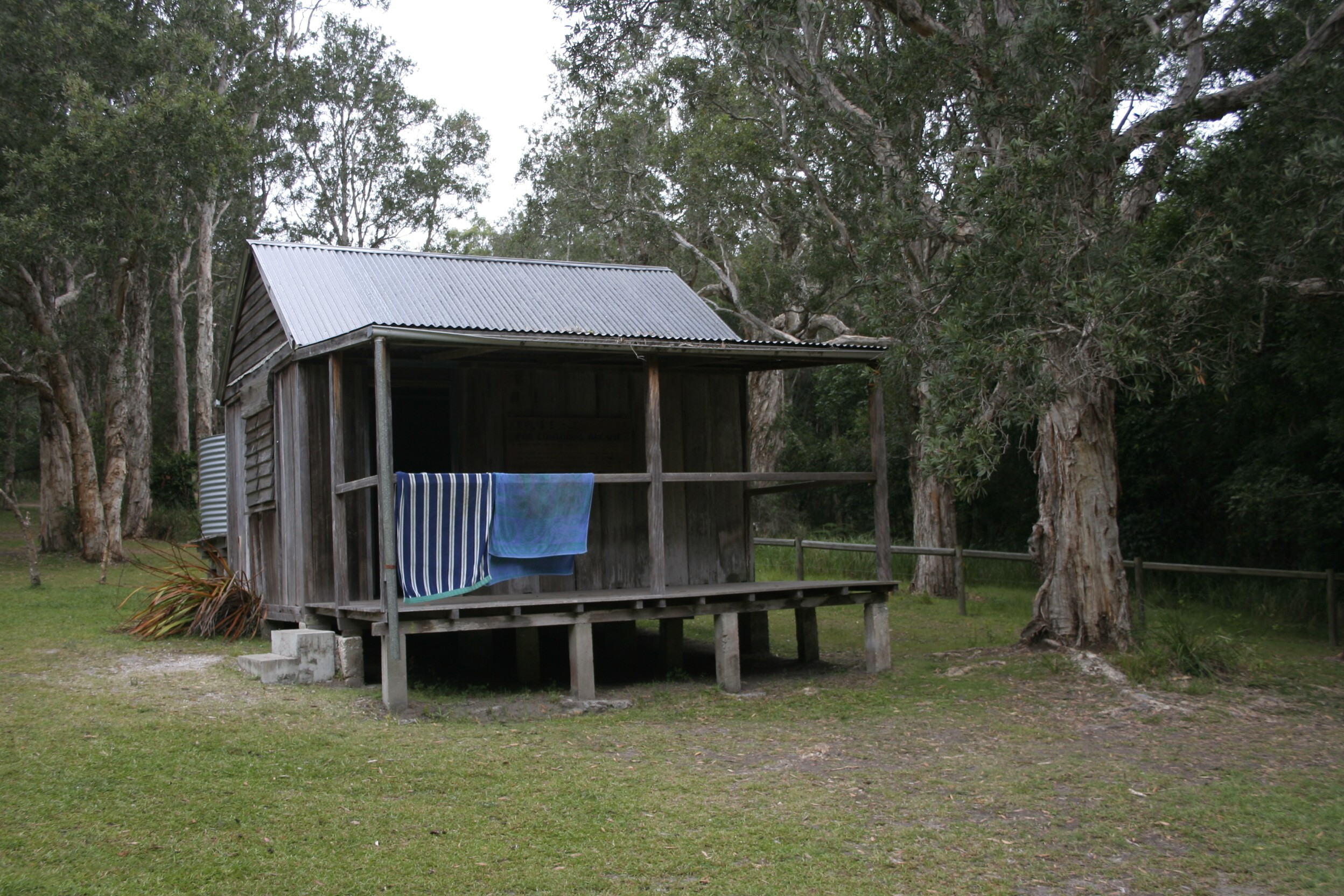
- Kylie Tennant's hut

- Location within New South Wales
- Location: New South Wales
- Coordinates: 31°48′59″S 152°43′17″E
- Area: 102 km^{2} (39 sq mi)
- Established: 1972
- Governing body: NSW National Parks & Wildlife Service

Crowdy Bay is a national park in New South Wales, Australia, 271 km northeast of Sydney.

It is a seaside retreat, close to Port Macquarie, offering hiking trails, coastal picnics, fishing, and great opportunities to observe wildlife.

The biodiversity in the park is very rich. These include white-bellied sea eagles (Haliaeetus leucogaster), brown-striped frog (Limnodynastes peronii), lace monitor (Varanus varius), black sheoak (Allocasuarina littoralis), and grass tree (Xanthorrhoea spp.).

Crowdy Bay National Park was badly affected during the 2019–20 Australian bushfire season with 12,000 hectares including pockets of coastal rainforest destroyed and author Kylie Tennant's retreat in Crowdy Bay called "Kylie's Hut", destroyed as well in November 2019.

== See also ==
- Protected areas of New South Wales
