= Dooragan National Park =

National park in Australia

- IUCN category II (national park)
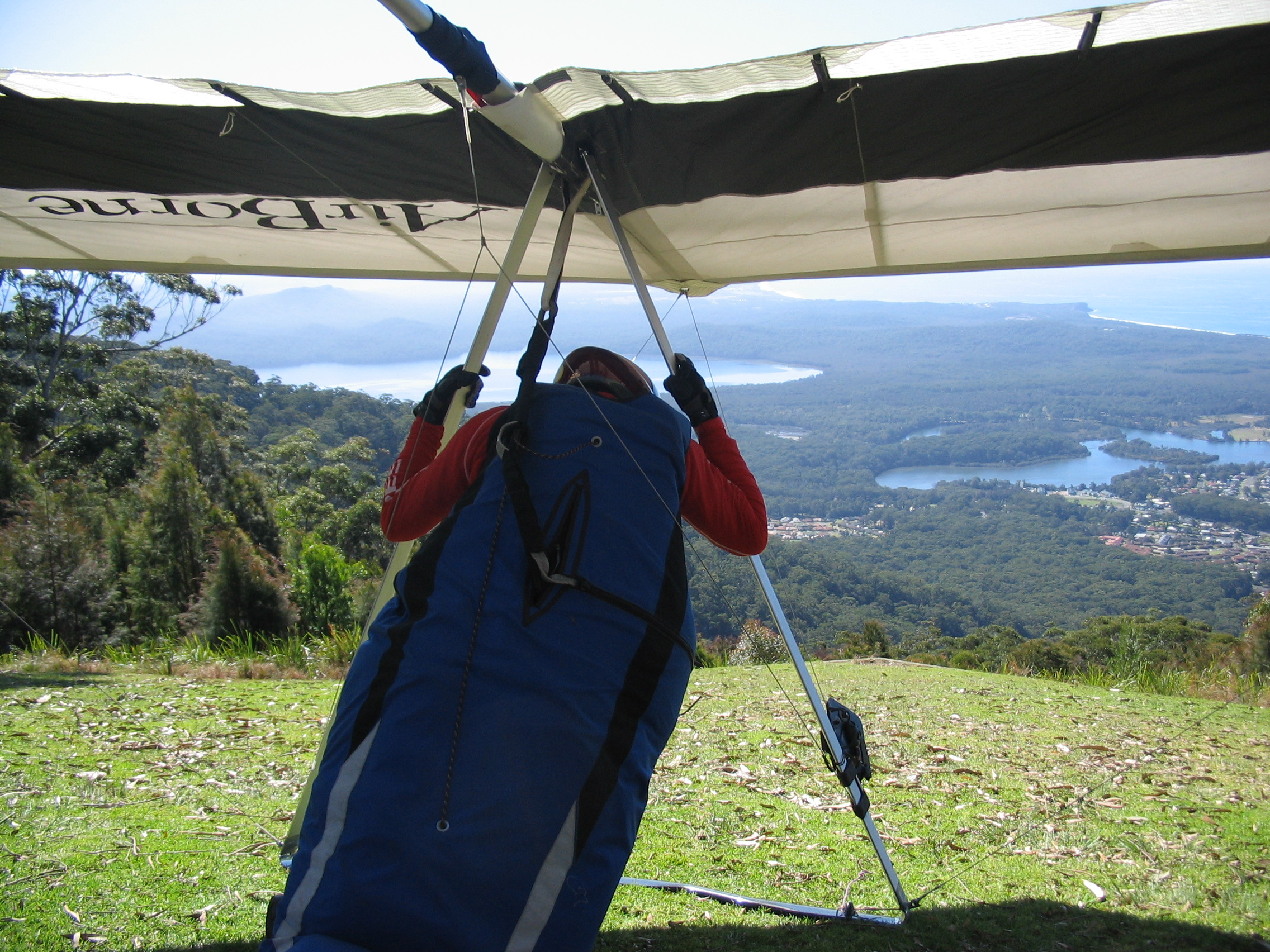
- A hang glider prepared for flight from North Brother Mountain

- Location within New South Wales
- Location: New South Wales
- Coordinates: 31°39′52″S 152°46′26″E
- Area: 11 km^{2} (4.2 sq mi)
- Established: 1997
- Governing body: National Parks and Wildlife Service (New South Wales)

The Dooragan National Park is a national park on the Mid North Coast of New South Wales, Australia. The national park is situated near Laurieton, and is approximately 365 kilometres (227 mi) northeast of Sydney.

== Three Brothers ==
The local aboriginal people tell a dreamtime story of three brothers of the Birpai tribe who were killed by a witch called Widjirriejuggi and were buried where the mountains stand. The youngest of the three was Dooragan, for whom the park is named.

By amazing coincidence, when Captain James Cook passed the area on 12 May 1770 he named the mountains Three Brothers, since "these Hills bore some resemblance to each other". Cook had earlier (25 January 1769) written of the Three Brothers hills west of Cape St Diego, so perhaps he was inspired by them too.

North Brother Mountain (Dooragan) supports a wide range of vegetation communities – including some of the best examples of old growth blackbutt forest in the area and pockets of sub-tropical rainforest – that provide habitat for gliders, bats and koalas. The park has a weed problem with the spreading of lantana.

The mountain was made a timber reserve in 1892 and later called the Camden Haven State Forest. Portions of the mountain were logged but large sections were untouched due to the terrain. It was opened to the public in 1970 when a road to the summit was constructed. The steep windy road has now been sealed, but it is unsuitable for caravans. Viewing platforms, which have wheelchair access, offer good views up and down the coast. Picnic, barbecue and toilet facilities are available. There are walks of varying length and difficulty.

== Fauna ==
The park is inhabited by many species of birds, whose diversity cannot be seen at first glance. There are currawongs, kookaburras, cheeky magpies and many more.

== See also ==
- Protected areas of New South Wales
