= Laurieton =

- Town
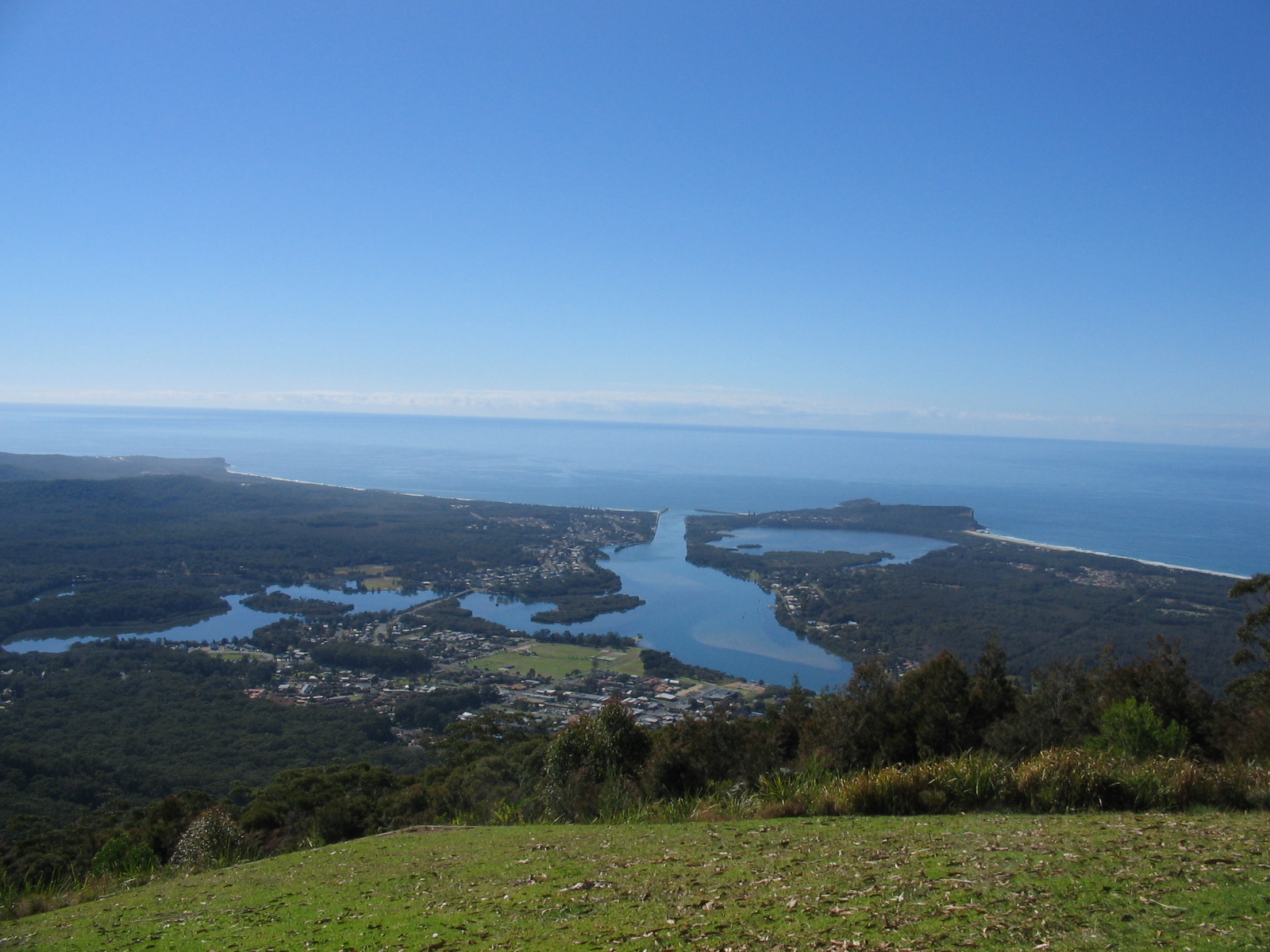
- Laurieton from North Brother Mountain

- Coordinates: 31°39′01″S 152°47′48″E
- Country: Australia
- State: New South Wales
- City: Camden Haven
- LGA: Port Macquarie-Hastings Council
- Location: 365 km (227 mi) north of Sydney; 30 km (19 mi) south of Port Macquarie

Government
  - State electorate: Port Macquarie
  - Federal division: Lyne
- Elevation: 12 m (39 ft)

Population
  - Total: 2,012 (SAL 2021)
- Postcode: 2443
- Mean max temp: 21.8 °C (71.2 °F)
- Mean min temp: 11.3 °C (52.3 °F)
- Annual rainfall: 1,549.3 mm (61.00 in)

Laurieton (/ˈlɒrɪtən/) is a coastal town on the Mid North Coast of the Australian state of New South Wales. Laurieton is the largest town in the Camden Haven district. Laurieton is 365 km north of Sydney and 42 km south of Port Macquarie. It lies between the base of North Brother Mountain and the Camden Haven River.

The Birpai (also known as Birrbay) people have lived in this area for more than 40,000 years.

The largest school in the district, Camden Haven High School, is located approximately 5 km away from Laurieton's shopping and business centre.

== History ==
Captain James Cook named "the Brothers" on 12 May 1770 for their resemblance to mountains in his native Yorkshire. He was unwittingly mirroring the name given to them by the Birpai. The Camden Haven area was explored on foot by John Oxley in 1818 and was first settled by Europeans in the early 1820s. A convict settlement was established at nearby Port Macquarie in 1821 and the first settlers were limeburners burning oyster shells for buildings there. Some of these lived at the foot of North Brother. There was also a small garrison of soldiers to catch escaping convicts. In 1827 the area was surveyed by Armstrong and Guilding as part of an assessment for the Australian Agricultural Company.

Joseph Laurie J.P. (1832–1904) had timber interests in the Laurieton area in partnership with his brothers Andrew and Alexander. He moved to the area from Taree in 1872 and took charge of the Laurieton post office when it opened on 1 Oct 1875. Until the opening of the post office the area was known as Peach Orchard or Peach Grove (sources differ) and the name change recognised the Laurie family's local influence.

The Laurieton timber mill, owned by Laurie Brothers and built on the river bank, officially opened on 12 January 1876 and a store was built opposite at the same time. The mill was operated initially by Joseph Laurie. Two years later a second timber mill was built by John Hibbard at Camden Haven Heads. However this mill was later moved to the Hastings River. Another mill, owned by John Rodger commenced operations soon after.

Joseph Laurie operated two ketches from Laurieton. The "Mary Laurie" was built at Laurieton and launched on 11 Nov 1884. The "Annie Laurie" was built at Brisbane Water.

By 1886 Laurieton had 4 timber mills operating in the vicinity. There were 3 steam punts with 2 more being built and a bakery had recently been established.

Captain George De Fraine was trading to Camden Haven in his ketch "Ethel B.T." from about 1887 and later also operated a steam tug "Unique". In 1893 he entered into partnership with John Rodger.

William McKay & Hugh Bibby had leased and operated Joseph Laurie's sawmill from around 1880. When Joseph Laurie sold his interests to George De Fraine in about 1896, the mill was operated as a partnership of De Fraine, McKay and Bibby until 1899 when George De Fraine took full ownership. George De Fraine also acquired the lease for the mill built by Messrs Dun and Bagan (later known as the Dun-Bagan mill) operating on land opposite Laurieton.

In 1891 the Lands Department proposed changing the name of Laurieton to Camden Haven (coinciding with the change of name of the former Camden Haven to Kendall). This was extremely unpopular with Laurieton residents and the name remained unchanged.

The steamship "Hastings", sailing ship "Isabella de Fraine" and steamship "Cobar" were built at Laurieton between 1901 and 1903.

De Fraine oversaw his extensive business interests in the area until his death in 1907.

A Catalina seaplane carrying entertainer Bob Hope was forced to make an emergency landing on Camden Haven adjacent to Laurieton on 14 August 1944. Bob Hope was returning to Sydney after entertaining troops in Guam. The local postmaster lent him money for his hotel bills after the luggage was jettisoned. An impromptu party was held, and the next day Hope and his entourage travelled by road to Newcastle and flew from there to Sydney. Bob Hope maintained contact with the residents of Laurieton for decades afterwards.

== Population ==
In the 2016 Census, there were 1,986 people in Laurieton. 81.9% of people were born in Australia and 93.0% of people spoke only English at home. The most common responses for religion were Anglican 32.4%, No Religion 22.5% and Catholic 19.7%.

== Heritage listings ==
Laurieton has a number of heritage-listed sites, including:

- Cnr Laurie and Bold Streets: Laurieton School of Arts

== Climate ==
Laurieton has a humid subtropical climate (Köppen: Cfa) with warm, wet summers and cool winters. In the past it had an oceanic climate (Cfb) based on data from the first half of the twentieth century. Despite the town's high precipitation, its rainy days are relatively low on an annual basis, meaning that the town gets heavy rainfall events a few times a month.

Climate data for Laurieton
Month	Jan	Feb	Mar	Apr	May	Jun	Jul	Aug	Sep	Oct	Nov	Dec	Year
Mean daily maximum °C (°F)	25.8 (78.4)	25.8 (78.4)	24.6 (76.3)	22.8 (73.0)	19.6 (67.3)	17.3 (63.1)	16.6 (61.9)	18.0 (64.4)	20.1 (68.2)	22.3 (72.1)	23.9 (75.0)	25.2 (77.4)	21.8 (71.2)
Mean daily minimum °C (°F)	16.2 (61.2)	16.7 (62.1)	15.4 (59.7)	12.5 (54.5)	8.7 (47.7)	6.3 (43.3)	5.3 (41.5)	6.2 (43.2)	8.2 (46.8)	11.0 (51.8)	13.6 (56.5)	15.2 (59.4)	11.3 (52.3)
Average precipitation mm (inches)	149.2 (5.87)	184.9 (7.28)	186.0 (7.32)	159.1 (6.26)	133.0 (5.24)	134.6 (5.30)	92.3 (3.63)	83.0 (3.27)	74.6 (2.94)	100.2 (3.94)	114.4 (4.50)	124.4 (4.90)	1,546.8 (60.90)
Average precipitation days	9.9	10.4	11.4	9.7	8.6	8.1	7.2	6.6	7.0	8.3	9.0	9.1	105.3
Source: BOMM

== Notable people ==
- Haine Eames (born 2008), professional soccer player
