= Warrimoo, New South Wales =

Village in the Blue Mountains, Australia

Warrimoo
- Town
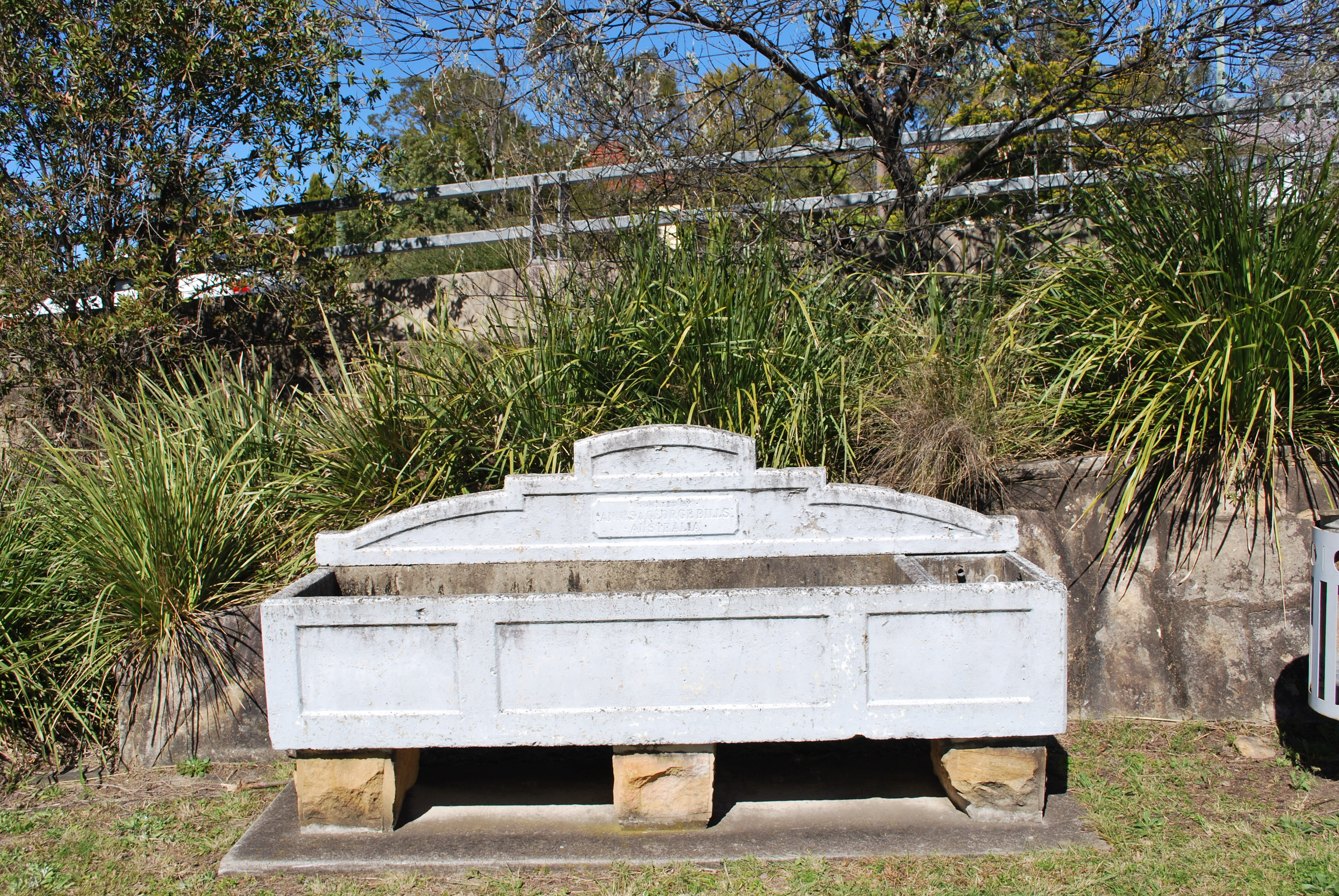

- Interactive map of Warrimoo
- Coordinates: 33.727124°S 150.599413°E
- Country: Australia
- State: New South Wales
- City: City of Blue Mountains
- LGA: City of Blue Mountains
- Location: 68 km (42 mi) west of Sydney CBD; 35 km (22 mi) east of Katoomba

Government
  - State electorate: Blue Mountains
  - Federal division: Macquarie
- Elevation: 273 m (896 ft)

Population
  - Total: 2,452 (2021 census)
- Postcode: 2774
Localities around Warrimoo
Sun Valley	Yellow Rock	Yellow Rock
Valley Heights	Warrimoo	Mount Riverview
Blue Mountains National Park	Blaxland	Blaxland

Warrimoo, formerly called Karabar, is a medium-sized village in the lower Blue Mountains of New South Wales, Australia, 273 metres above sea level. Warrimoo is 68 kilometres west of Sydney, in the local government area of the City of Blue Mountains. Warrimoo borders the townships/suburbs of Blaxland, Mount Riverview, Sun Valley and Valley Heights. The suburb is located five train stops from Penrith and 11 train stops to Katoomba.

== History ==
Warrimoo is an Aboriginal word meaning 'eagle's nest' or 'place of the screaming white bird'.

In 1898, a railway station platform named Karabar was built in the area to service a developing estate, possibly sharing the same name. It had closed before World War I, but in 1918 a new station was built, not much further down the Blue Mountains line, named Warrimoo. Entrepreneur and developer Arthur Rickard was behind the development of Warrimoo. His plan was to subdivide blocks so there were a mixture of small blocks and larger blocks, which he established to promote sustainable living. On what was known as the Warrimoo Estate, Rickard encouraged residents to develop orchards, vegetable gardens and raise chickens. Warrimoo retains many historical homes and buildings throughout the village including a distillery (where the local public school now sits) and a former "Bordillo". Charity worker and gospeller George Ardill, moved to Warrimoo in his latter years. He lived at 13 Florabella Street. During his years there, Ardill built numerous homes along Florabella St and The Avenue, which he set up for homeless women and children. Ardill was also a key instigator in the removal of generations of Indigenous children from their families across Australia via his role in the New South Wales Aborigines Protection Board.

Dorothy Wall, author of the children's book Blinky Bill, lived in Warrimoo from 1934 to 1937 whilst publishing the second book of the series. In 2015, a mural was painted at Possum Park in honour of the illustrator.

== Population ==
The population of Warrimoo is mostly of European background. Languages apart from English spoken in Warrimoo include French, Mandarin, Greek, Spanish and Italian. 31% of residents hold bachelor's degrees or higher and 30% are professionals. More than 35% have no religious affiliation. The median weekly household income is $2,097.

== Local services ==
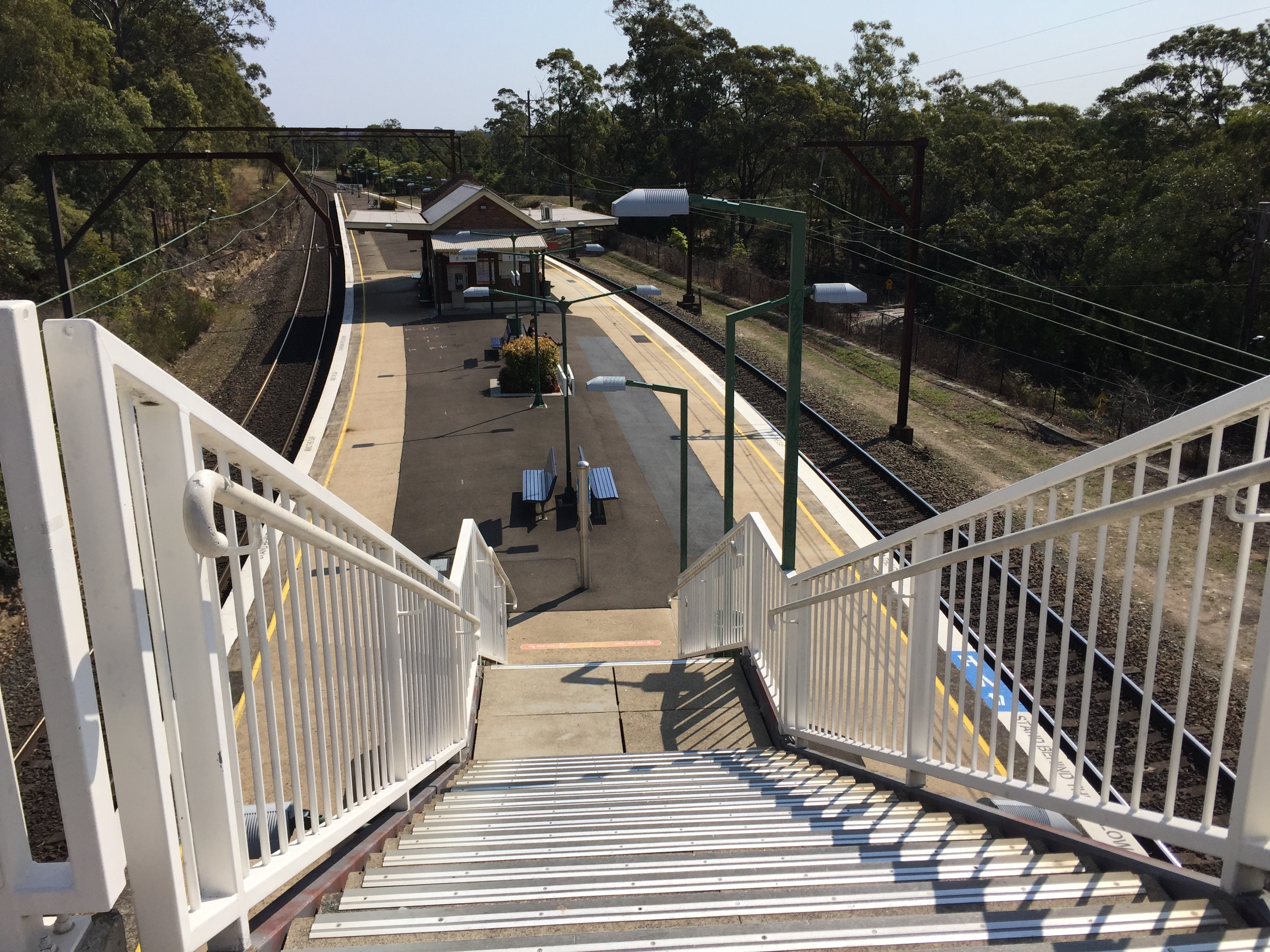
Warrimoo railway station

At the centre of Warrimoo is railway station (with bike racks) and Warrimoo Citizens Hall. There are several shops around the train station including a post office, fire station, cafe, car mechanic, antique shops, restaurant/venue hire and a general store which is a popular tourist bus stop off point for groups heading to Katoomba and the Jenolan Caves.

== Parks and entertainment ==
Parks include Ardill Park, Arthur St Park, Possum Park, Terrymont Rd Park and Cross St Nature Reserve. The Florabella Pass track is a popular hike between Warrimoo and Blaxland. Tennis Courts and Warrimoo oval are both on Rickard Rd.

Other local attractions within a 10 km radius include Glenbrook Swim Centre, Nepean River, Nepean Belle Paddlewheeler, Sydney International Regatta Centre, iFLY Downunder, Jetpack Adventures, Cables Wake Park, Glenbrook Cinema and Penrith Panthers. A further 20 minutes from Penrith is water park, Raging Waters and Sydney Zoo.

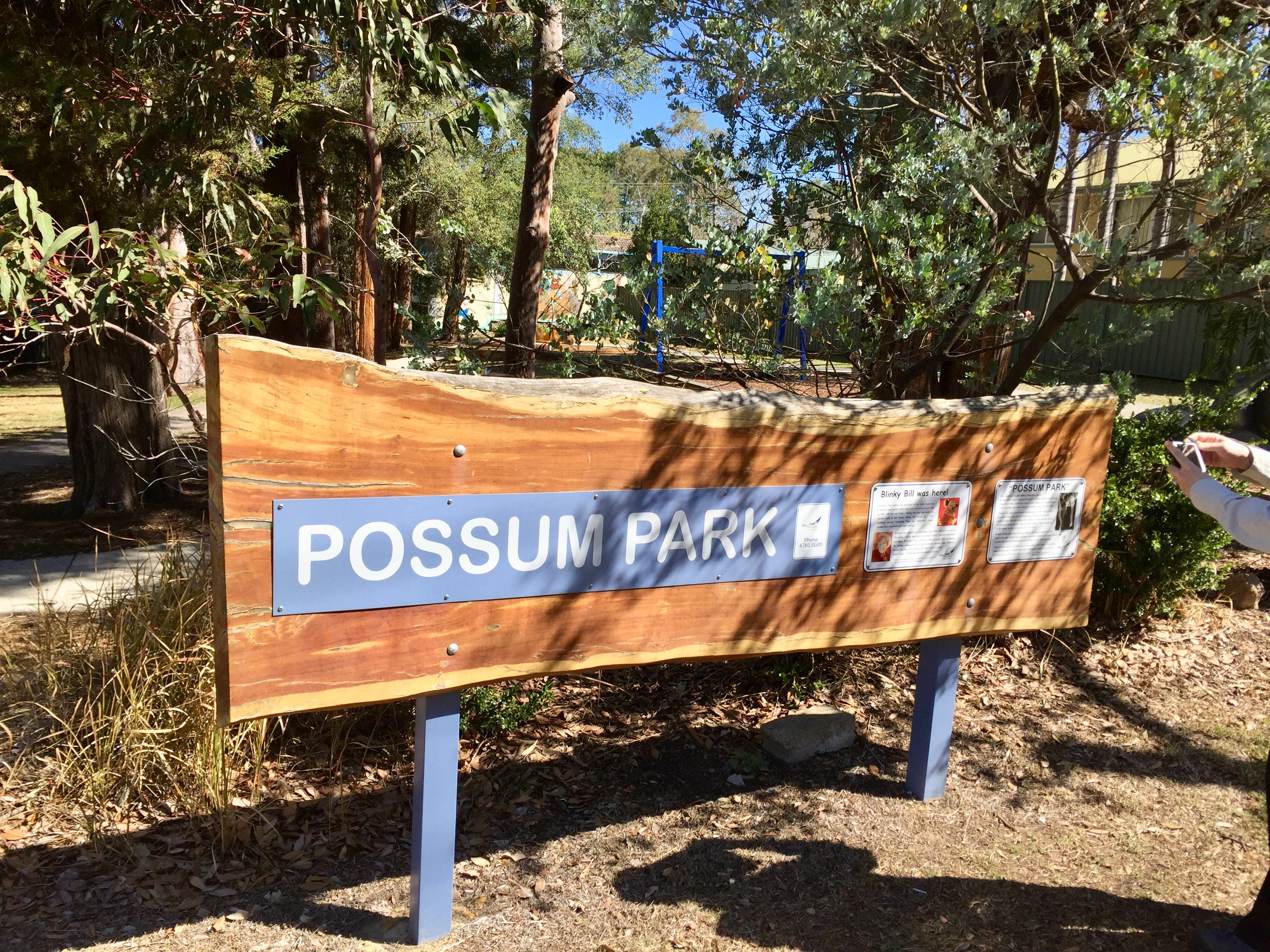
Possum Park

== Transport ==
Warrimoo railway station is on the Blue Mountains Line of the NSW TrainLink intercity network. Warrimoo is also serviced by bus through Blue Mountains Transit and Uber. The original 1918 Warrimoo station burnt down in a bushfire in the 1950s and was subsequently rebuilt. A decision by the NSW Liberal government to buy new South Korean made trains has resulted in controversy over Warrimoo's train station which may need renovating to accommodate the trains that are up to 205 metres long. Added to that, the train tracks may also need adjusting.

== Schools and childcare ==
Warrimoo is served by a small public school on Florabella Rd (Warrimoo Public School) and a K-12 private school (Wycliffe Christian School).

Other nearby schools include Blue Mountains Grammar School, Springwood High, Winmalee High and Blaxland High.

== Culture ==
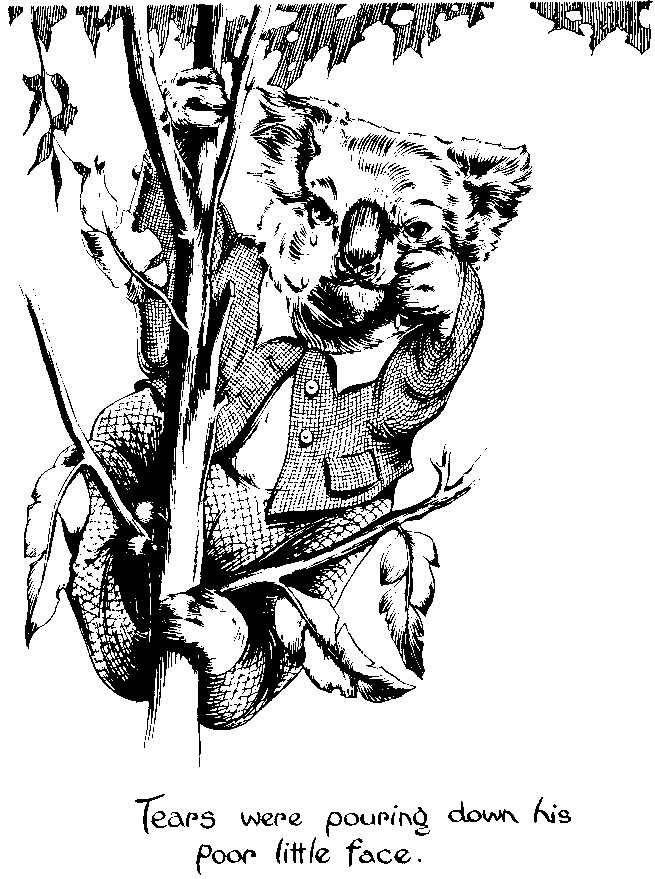
Blinky Bill's father

Author and illustrator Dorothy Wall, who lived in Florabella St (1934–37), placed Warrimoo on the map with her children's books about the mischievous koala, Blinky Bill. Polish born film maker Yoram Gross, turned the books into movies bringing the iconic character onto the world stage.

Not far away is the Norman Lindsay Gallery and Museum in Faulconbridge. Norman Lindsay wrote about Bunyip Bluegum, the anthropomorphic koala star of well known children's book, The Magic Pudding which was also turned into a movie, directed by Karl Zwicky.

Former Daily Telegraph journalist and founding Australian House and Garden editor Beryl Guertner, lived in Warrimoo.

There are local music and choir groups that are community run such as the Moo Choir, which meets and performs out of the Warrimoo Public School hall, and the biannual music group, the Sound Lounge.

George Finey, who was a cartoonist on the Daily Telegraph also spent time living in Warrimoo.

The poet Greg McLaren, author of the post-apocalyptic verse novel camping underground, and the collections Windfall, Australian ravens and The Kurri Kurri Book of the Dead, is a resident of Warrimoo.

== Bushwalking ==
The Florabella Pass Track is a popular and scenic nature walk from Warrimoo into Blaxland and passes through abundant foliage, creeks and rare wildlife. The bush walk leads into a thick rainforest filled with lyrebirds, flame robins, sulphur-crested cockatoos, gang gang cockatoos, owls and other rare species. The Pippas Pass portion of the track is renowned for its colourful bushland such as flannel flowers, waratah plants and pink angophoras and its shelter caves. The walk is less than 9 km however involves some steep hiking. There are many other bushwalking tracks, including a long walk to Glenbrook via the untracked Glenbrook Gorge. The Wilderness Society and other environmental groups encourage koala sightings to be reported due to their endangered existence.

== Heritage listings ==
Warimoo has a number of heritage listings, including:

- Blue Mountains National Park: Blue Mountains walking tracks
