= The Wild Adventures of Blinky Bill =

Australian animated television series

- Genre: Animated series
- Based on: The Complete Adventures of Blinky Bill by Dorothy Wall
- Written by: Fin Edquist; Giula Sandler; Tim Lee; Cleon Prineas; Charlotte Rose Hamlyn; Jane Schneider; Michelle Offen; Sam Meikle; Adam Smith; Pete Reeves; Bruce Griffiths; Zoe Harrington; Rachel Spratt; Richie Conroy; Barbara Deignan; Patrick Chapman; Sergio Delfino; Jason Tammemagi
- Directed by: Andrew Collins; Richard Simmons; Steve Cooper
- Creative director: Andy Collins
- Voices of: Cam Ralph; Akmal Saleh; Peter McAllum; Charlotte Rose Hamlyn; Rupert Degas; Jim Pike; Bridie Connell; Jamie Croft; Nathan Harvey; Beth Armstrong; Ash Ricardo
- Opening theme: "Put Your Paws In"
- Ending theme: "Put Your Paws In" (Instrumental)
- Country of origin: Australia
- Original language: English
- No. of seasons: 1
- No. of episodes: 26 (whole); 52 (segments)

Production
- Executive producers: Barbara Stephen; Soumyashree Mohapatra; Paul Cummins; Niki Hamilton; Sebastian Debertin; Patrick Elmendorff
- Producers: Tracy Lenon; Alexia Gates-Foale; Cathy Ní Fhlaithearta
- Running time: 26 minutes (whole); 11 minutes (segments)
- Production companies: Flying Bark Productions; Telegael; Studio 100; Studio 100 Media; Giant Wheel Animation

Original release
- Network: 7TWO (formerly); ABC ME
- Release: 5 December 2016 – 5 October 2017

The Wild Adventures of Blinky Bill is an Australian animated television series based on the books by Dorothy Wall, and a sequel series to the 2015 film Blinky Bill the Movie.

== Plot ==
Blinky Bill is back to bring his trademark mischief, mayhem, and humour to life. Along with his best mate and sidekick Jacko, Blinky takes on the role as defender of his outback home, Greenpatch.

== Characters ==
- Blinky Bill (voiced by Cam Ralph) – an 11-year-old koala who is the main protagonist.
- Jacko Browing (voiced by Akmal Saleh) – a frill-necked lizard who is Blinky's sidekick and best friend.
- Nutsy Koala (voiced by Bridie Connell) – a young female koala and Blinky's closest friend.
- Cranky (voiced by Peter McAllum) – a tyrannical goanna who is Blinky's nemesis and the mayor of Greenpatch.
- Juan Pablo (voiced by Rupert Degas) – a Paraguayan parrot.
- Bandi (voiced by Rupert Degas) – a mischievous bandicoot.
- Coot (voiced by Cam Ralph) – another mischievous bandicoot.
- Mr. Wombat (voiced by Jim Pike) – a wombat and Blinky's mentor.
- Claude (voiced by Ash Ricardo) – a feral cat and Blinky's other nemesis.
- Eddy (voiced by Rupert Degas) – an American squirrel.
- Robert (voiced by Cam Ralph) – a lyrebird and one of Blinky's friends.
- Marcia (voiced by Charlotte Hamlyn) – a marsupial mouse and one of Blinky's friends.
- Sugar (voiced by Bridie Connell) – a sugar glider and one of Blinky's friends.
- Spike (voiced by Nathan Harvey) – an echidna and one of Blinky's friends.
- Mrs. Bill (voiced by Beth Armstrong) – a koala who is Blinky's mother.
- Ms. Tibbins (voiced by Beth Armstrong) – a kiwi bird from New Zealand who is a school teacher.
- Bill Koala (voiced by Jamie Croft) – a koala who is Blinky's father only mentioned on the episodes and he appears in "Home to Roost".
- San Jorge (voiced by Tin Pang) – a sulphur-crested cockatoo.
- Roddy MacBill – a koala and Blinky Bill's uncle who plays the bagpipes.
- Bob – a friend of Jacko who was killed by hunters years ago.
- Uncle Jack – a frill-necked lizard and Jacko's uncle.
- Echo – a gecko barrowing Robert's glasses.
- Bluey (voiced by Coco Jack Gillies) – a blue footed booby.
- Bell (voiced by Stuart Brown) – TBA
- Doris Cranklepot – Cranky's mother
- Whoogle – an owl.
- Kev – a koala who becomes a Guardian of Greenpatch.
- Mr. Owl – Whoogle's father.
- Priscilla – a frog.
- Midge – a grasshopper.
- Eagle – a wedge tailed eagle.
- Crocodiles – saltwater crocodiles.

== Episodes ==
No.	Title	Directed by	Written by	Storyboarded by	Original release date
1a	"Brain Freeze"	Andrew Collins	Fin Edquist	Manuk Chang and Steve Cooper	5 December 2016
When Cranky takes advantage of the confused Greenpatchians, Blinky and his best mate Jacko embark on a journey to save them with the one thing that can quench thirst on a hot summer day.
1b	"The Bunyip Hunter"	Steve Cooper; Andrew Collins (co-director)	Giula Sandler	Manuk Chang	5 December 2016
Blinky and Jacko investigate a concerning increase in incidents of honey theft in Greenpatch, which fuel rumors of a mythical creature.
2a	"New Sheriff in Town"	Andrew Collins	Tim Lee	Manuk Chang	6 December 2016
Mayor Cranky tries to distract Jacko from the poetry competition by making him sheriff. Blinky tries to help Jacko realize that Cranky only gave him the title to get him out of the way.
2b	"Cranky the Clown"	Steve Cooper; Andrew Collins (co-director)	Cleon Prineas	Marc Camelbeke	6 December 2016
Cranky, the neurotic village party pooper, threatens to ruin Spike's birthday party, and it is up to Blinky and Jacko to save the day.
3a	"Blinky the Brave"	Andrew Collins	Charlotte Rose Hamlyn	Jerome Co	7 December 2016
It is up to Blinky and Jacko to keep the town safe during magpie season, when the black and white birds embark on their endless and terrifying swooping campaigns.
3b	"Poopy Trudy"	Andrew Collins	Fin Edquist	Manuk Chang	7 December 2016
Blinky and Jacko stumble upon a talking doll, who they believe to be human. As Jacko gets caught up in his new fatherly duties, Blinky decides to search for the parents.
4a	"It's a Date"	Andrew Collins	Jane Schneider	Barry Reynolds	8 December 2016
Pablo is looking for love and needs help to find it from Blinky and Jacko. He has a date with his dream girl, but he's never gone on a date before.
4b	"Sir Claude's Last Life"	Andrew Collins	Cleon Prineas	Ian Young	8 December 2016
Mr. Claude is reduced to the state of a scared kitten after using eight of his lives; Blinky and Jacko decide to make a deal with the evil cat to keep Greenpatch peaceful.
5a	"Jurassic Burrow"	Andrew Collins	Michelle Offen	Jerome Co	9 December 2016
Blinky and Jacko try to help Wombo retrieve his marbles from the depths of his lair. But when Jacko accidentally swallows the light, he gathers a new crowd of followers.
5b	"Rainbows & Princesses"	Richard Simmons	Sam Meikle	Manuk Chang	9 December 2016
Blinky and Jacko decide they want to see what a rainbow tastes like. Instead, they stumble upon a frog princess, who is worried that her prince will never arrive.
6a	"Mystery Ball"	Richard Simmons; Andrew Collins (co-director)	Adam Smith and Pete Reeves	David Gonzales	12 December 2016
A talking ball arrives in Greenpatch, and begins to take over the inhabitants' minds. Blinky realizes the ball is trouble, and decides to try and destroy it.
6b	"Freaky Frillday"	Andrew Collins	Bruce Griffiths	David Gonzales	12 December 2016
Blinky sends Jacko to a healer, to try and help him to stop being afraid of everything. But when Jacko becomes reckless and befriends Sir Charles, Blinky wants his old friend back.
7a	"Notions Eleven"	Andrew Collins	Zoe Harrington	Marc Camelbeke	13 December 2016
Jacko gets into trouble when he decides to take some leftovers from humans, and is subsequently captured. Blinky decides to organize a task force to try and rescue him.
7b	"Attack of the Extra-tree-restrials"	Steve Cooper; Andrew Collins (co-director)	Bruce Griffiths	Anne Yi	13 December 2016
While reading a book about aliens, Blinky is interrupted by a flying object in the sky. He and Jacko investigate the site where the object crash lands, and come across what they believe to be aliens.
8a	"Robert's Sound"	Andrew Collins	Giula Sandler	Jerome Co	14 December 2016
Blinky and Jacko decide to turn the search for Robert's glasses into a treasure hunt. They soon run into Gecko, who doesn't want to give up the glasses because he is lonely.
8b	"Cloud Catchers"	Andrew Collins	Rachel Spratt	Ben McLaughlin	14 December 2016
The inhabitants of Greenpatch are devastated when a drought means that they have no crops to feed them. Cranky wants to build another town after himself, but Blinky is determined to stop him.
9a	"The Ultimate Prey"	Andrew Collins	Charlotte Rose Hamlyn	Ian Young	15 December 2016
Blinky and Jacko try to add some excitement and adventure in the annual class bush survival walk, but their plan becomes a little too successful.
9b	"Box World"	Andrew Collins	Richie Conroy	Allan Abelardo	15 December 2016
Blinky and Jacko go on an adventure to an imaginary world called Box World.
10a	"Crazy Golf"	Richard Simmons	Pete Reeves	Manuk Chang	16 December 2016
Blinky invents the game of golf, but his fun is short-lived when Cranky decides to forbid it; when Cranky renames the game and claims it as his own, Blinky challenges him to a duel.
10b	"Outbreak into Song"	Andrew Collins	Barbara Deignan and Adam Smith	Ben McLaughlin	16 December 2016
The inhabitants of Greenpatch fall under an unusual spell, which makes them sing along as soon as they hear a certain melody. Blinky and Jacko try to find out what is going on.
11a	"The Crankynator"	Andrew Collins	Bruce Griffiths	TBA	19 December 2016
Blinky and Jacko grow tired of Cranky as he continues to boss everyone around. Deciding that he needs a taste of his own medicine, they call Cranky's mother to do the same to him.
11b	"Time Machine"	Andrew Collins	Sam Meikle	Marc Camelbeke	19 December 2016
When the news of a crocodile approaching Greenpatch spreads quickly through the village, Blinky and Jacko take control.
12a	"Mine for the Taking"	Andrew Collins	Tim Lee	TBA	20 December 2016
Mayor Cranky decides that he will implement an annual holiday, celebrating himself. But when he implements a tax that sees him take a compass from Blinky's father, Blinky decides to reclaim it.
12b	"The Escape"	Richard Simmons	Barbara Deignan	Barry Reynolds	20 December 2016
When they are forced to listen to a lecture by Cranky, Blinky and his friends dig an escape tunnel. But when they end up in a crocodile infested area, they must rely on Cranky for help.
13a	"The Pierat Queen"	Andrew Collins	Cleon Prineas	Ben McLaughlin	18 September 2017 (Note: This episode aired on 17 February 2017 in Poland (teleTOON+).)
The annual tart competition comes under threat when Marcia is hired to guard the goods. Marcia suffers from narcolepsy, which makes it easy for the pirate queen to try and steal the tarts.
13b	"Recycled"	Andrew Collins	Tim Lee	Drooby Doo	18 September 2017 (Note: This episode aired on 20 February 2017 in Poland (teleTOON+).)
Sick of the mess Wombo has made, Mayor Cranklepot demands that he cleans up the junkyard.
14a	"Dragon's Tale"	Andrew Collins	Tim Lee	Marc Camelbeke	19 September 2017 (Note: This episode aired on 2 August 2017 in Latin America (Nat Geo Kids).)
Blinky and his friends enjoy telling stories to each other around the campfire. Cranky soon decides to issue a ban, prohibiting the friends from storytelling.
14b	"Kev"	Richard Simmons	Patrick Chapman; Sergio Delfino (co-writer)	Kevin Peaty	19 September 2017 (Note: This episode aired on 1 August 2017 in Latin America (Nat Geo Kids).)
Blinky is rescued by a koala so incredible he even smells like a hero. Kev is a bigger, smarter, braver version of Blinky, and everyone is quick to name him as the official Guardian of Greenpatch. Everyone except Blinky.
15a	"Castaways"	Andrew Collins	Tim Lee	Jerome Co	20 September 2017 (Note: This episode aired on 7 August 2017 in Latin America (Nat Geo Kids).)
Mayor Cranky gets annoyed when the Greenville youngsters play outside his home and make lots of noise, so he turns to some friends to deal with the problem.
15b	"Mission Impossumable"	Richard Simmons	Richie Conroy	Allan Abelardo	20 September 2017 (Note: This episode aired on 3 August 2017 in Latin America (Nat Geo Kids).)
Blinky and Jacko team up to help Pablo catch a diabolical thief, who they soon realize is oddly tidy.
16a	"The Highland Games"	Richard Simmons	Jason Tammemagi	Simon Bradbury	21 September 2017 (Note: This episode aired on 4 August 2017 in Latin America (Nat Geo Kids).)
Blinky is pleased to have Roddy McBill, his Scottish uncle, come visit him. When Mayor Cranky learns of the visitor's origins, he talks about his own Scottish heritage.
16b	"Gnome Man's Land"	Richard Simmons	Patrick Chapman	Marc Camelbeke	21 September 2017 (Note: This episode aired on 8 August 2017 in Latin America (Nat Geo Kids).)
Blinky and Jacko devise a plan to stop the crows from getting to the compost pile. But when their army of garden gnomes begin to fall, they must think of something else.
17a	"Blankie Bill"	Richard Simmons and Andrew Collins	Jason Tammemagi and Adam Smith	Gethin Jones	22 September 2017 (Note: This episode aired on 9 August 2017 in Latin America (Nat Geo Kids).)
Blinky and Jacko's teacher Miss Tibbins wants to teach the class to be responsible. She gives them each a doll that they must look after, so they understand what it's like to care for someone.
17b	"Born to Teach"	Andrew Collins	Michelle Offen	Barry Reynolds	22 September 2017 (Note: This episode aired on 10 August 2017 in Latin America (Nat Geo Kids).)
Miss Tibbins becomes frustrated with her students and finally quits her job as a teacher. Blinky and Jacko are devastated to find out that her replacement is none other than Mayor Cranky.
18a	"Inconvenient Friend"	Andrew Collins	Tim Lee	Simona Tositti	25 September 2017 (Note: This episode aired on 11 August 2017 in Latin America (Nat Geo Kids).)
Blinky grows worried when Jacko begins to avoid him for days on end. When he finds out Jacko met with Cranky to discuss something secret, he becomes angry and confronts Jacko.
18b	"The Font of All Kn-owl-edge"	Richard Simmons	Barbara Deignan	Allan Alebardo	25 September 2017 (Note: This episode aired on 15 August 2017 in Latin America (Nat Geo Kids).)
Blinky's family try to welcome their new neighbors, Mr. Owl and his son Whoogle. Blinky and Jacko take Whoogle to school on his first day, and learn that he is not very brave.
19a	"The Winged Koala"	Richard Simmons	Jason Tammemagi	Manuk Chang	26 September 2017 (Note: This episode aired on 14 August 2017 in Latin America (Nat Geo Kids).)
Blinky and Jacko must help a baby blue-footed booby, who has fallen from the sky and been separated from her pack. They need to find her family so she can regain her memories.
19b	"Bewere the Moon"	Andrew Collins	Richie Conroy	Drooby Doo	26 September 2017 (Note: This episode aired on 16 August 2017 in Latin America (Nat Geo Kids).)
After they watch a scary movie, Blinky and Jacko believe they will be turned into a werewolf and a vampire. The only thing that might be able to save them is a lunar eclipse.
20a	"Mum vs Cranky"	Richard Simmons	Michelle Offen	Simon Bradbury	27 September 2017 (Note: This episode aired on 17 August 2017 in Latin America (Nat Geo Kids).)
When news of a dangerous croc heading for Greenpatch spreads like a bushfire, Blinky and Jacko decide to take matters into their own hands, going back in time to warn the villagers before the croc can get close!
20b	"Curse of the Double Curse"	Richard Simmons	Jason Tammemagi	Clark Irving and Ian Harrowell	27 September 2017 (Note: This episode aired on 18 August 2017 in Latin America (Nat Geo Kids).)
Blinky and Jacko accidentally get on the wrong side of a powerful frog witch, who curses the entire village of Greenpatch. She agrees to lift the curse, if Blinky can defeat her in her own game.
21a	"Old School"	Richard Simmons	Richie Conroy	Manuk Chang	28 September 2017 (Note: This episode aired on 22 August 2017 in Latin America (Nat Geo Kids).)
Jacko welcomes his distant uncle Jack when he comes to visit the family in Greenpatch. Uncle Jack tells them amazing tales and adventures, causing Blinky and Jacko to wonder what it is like to be old.
21b	"The Budgie Smuggler"	Andrew Collins	Charlotte Rose Hamlyn	Ian Young	28 September 2017 (Note: This episode aired on 24 August 2017 in Latin America (Nat Geo Kids).)
Tooty the budgie arrives in Greenville to tell Blinky, Jacko and Eddie of a kidnapping. Tooty explains that the other budgies have been captured by Min Mins, and he needs help rescuing them.
22a	"Dune Busters"	Richard Simmons	Richie Conroy	Barry Reynolds and Simona Tositti	29 September 2017 (Note: This episode aired on 23 August 2017 in Latin America (Nat Geo Kids).)
Blinky and Jacko try to entertain Daredevil Dave, who wanted to go on a skiing holiday but ended up in Australia instead of Austria. They show him that sand dunes can be just as exciting as ski slopes.
22b	"Blinky's Birthday"	Richard Simmons	Barbara Deignan	David Gonzales	29 September 2017
It's Blinky's birthday, and all he wants to do is celebrate with his friends and eat some birthday cake. But his attempt to clean his room soon turns into an adventure in itself.
23a	"Home to Roost"	Richard Simmons	Barbara Deignan	Simon Bradbury	2 October 2017
Blinky's Dad is back in Greenpatch! Alas the happy family reunion is soon spoiled by Cranky who, sour about the return of Bill Koala, lays down a challenge to prove he's not as brave and noble as everyone thinks he is.
23b	"Super Heroes"	Andrew Collins	Tim Lee	Ian Young	2 October 2017 (Note: This episode aired on 25 August 2017 in Latin America (Nat Geo Kids).)
After rescuing a small mouse, Blinky and Jacko play superheroes with him, and Greenpatch quickly descends into chaos.
24a	"Homesick"	Richard Simmons	Patrick Chapman	Ross De La Vega and Ian Harrowell	3 October 2017
Cranky's new Statue of Lizardy is the last straw for Eddy, it's official, he's homesick! Blinky and Jacko realize they will never be able to get Eddy back to New York, so they'll have to bring New York to Greenpatch.
24b	"Flying Circus"	Andrew Collins	Bruce Griffiths	Ben McLaughlin	3 October 2017 (Note: This episode aired on 21 August 2017 in Latin America (Nat Geo Kids).)
Blinky and Jacko are excited to learn that a flying circus is coming to Greenville. But when Mayor Cranklepot signs a decree banning them, they must find another way to attend.
25a	"The One"	Andrew Collins	Cleon Prineas	David Gonzales	4 October 2017
The guru goat, Sir Edward, decides to descend from the Mystic Mountain, to look for 'the one'. His 10-year meditation comes to an end as he realizes that the universe is no longer balanced.
25b	"Getalong Shirt"	Andrew Collins	Michelle Offen	Gethin Jones	4 October 2017
The arrival of Pablo's cousin brings back an old dispute. Blinky appears with a union shirt to end the fight between the two birds.
26a	"Founders Day"	Andrew Collins	Fin Edquist	Marc Camelbeke	5 October 2017
Cranky decides to put on a play that sees him as the founder and hero of Greenville. Blinky and his friends are annoyed, and want to stage their own artistic counterattack.
26b	"Room Mates"	Richard Simmons	Jason Tammemagi	Allan Alebardo	5 October 2017
Jacko accidentally causes a blockage of rubble to gather outside Cranky's house when he is playing with some glass marbles. Blinky and Jacko decide to try and clear the mess.

== International broadcast ==
Country	Channel	Debut	Title
Australia	7TWO	5 December 2016	The Wild Adventures of Blinky Bill
Poland	TeleTOON+	16 January 2017	Bystry Bill
Finland	Nelonen	11 November 2017	Vili Vilperin seikkailut
Brazil	Nat Geo Kids; Fox	3 October 2017	As Aventuras de Blinky Bill
Bolivia	Nat Geo Kids; Fox	1 July 2017	Las Aventuras de Blinky Bill
Argentina	Nat Geo Kids; Fox	1 July 2017	Las Aventuras de Blinky Bill
Chile	Nat Geo Kids; Fox	1 July 2017	Las Aventuras de Blinky Bill
Colombia	Nat Geo Kids; Fox	1 July 2017	Las Aventuras de Blinky Bill
Dominican Republic	Nat Geo Kids; Fox	1 July 2017	Las Aventuras de Blinky Bill
Ecuador	Nat Geo Kids; Fox	1 July 2017	Las Aventuras de Blinky Bill
El Salvador	Nat Geo Kids; Fox	1 July 2017	Las Aventuras de Blinky Bill
Guatemala	Nat Geo Kids; Fox	1 July 2017	Las Aventuras de Blinky Bill
Peru	Nat Geo Kids; Fox	1 July 2017	Las Aventuras de Blinky Bill
Mexico	Nat Geo Kids; Fox	1 July 2017	Las Aventuras de Blinky Bill
Uruguay	Nat Geo Kids; Fox	1 July 2017	Las Aventuras de Blinky Bill
Canada	Ici Radio-Canada Télé	9 September 2017	Les aventures extraordinaires de Blinky Bill
Portugal	RTP2	19 October 2017	Blinky Bill
Germany	KIKA	1 January 2018	Die unglaublichen Abenteuer von Blinky Bill
United States	Kids Central	2018	The Wild Adventures of Blinky Bill
Ukraine	PLUSPLUS	25 March 2019	Дикі пригоди Блінки Білла
Russia	Carousel	16 September 2019	Дикие приключения Блинки Билла

== Broadcast ==
The Wild Adventures of Blinky Bill debuted on 7TWO in Australia on 5 December 2016. In 2017, the series aired on teleTOON+ in Poland on 16 January, in Hungary on Minimax on 19 June, in Latin America and Brazil on Nat Geo Kids on 1 July and 1 September, respectively, and in Canada on Ici Radio-Canada Télé on 9 September. In 2018 and in Germany on KiKA on 1 January.

== Home media releases ==
=== DVD releases ===
- Blinky the Brave and Other Wild Tales (2018)
- The Escape and Other Wild Tales (2018)
- Mission Impossumable and Other Wild Tales (2018)
