= Mount Riverview, New South Wales =

Mount Riverview
- Town
- Interactive map of Mount Riverview
- Coordinates: 33°44′S 150°38′E
- Country: Australia
- State: New South Wales
- LGA: City of Blue Mountains
- Established: 1907

Government
  - State electorate: Blue Mountains
  - Federal division: Macquarie
- Elevation: 270 m (890 ft)

Population
  - Total: 3,074 (2021 census)
- Postcode: 2774
Localities around Mount Riverview
Warrimoo	Hawkesbury Heights	Cranebrook
Warrimoo	Mount Riverview	Emu Heights
Blaxland	Blaxland	Emu Heights

Category 1 tanker appliance, "Riverview 1"

Mount Riverview is a town in the Blue Mountains of New South Wales, Australia, west of Sydney. At the 2021 census, it had a population of 3,074.

The town has a volunteer rural fire brigade that forms part of the New South Wales Rural Fire Service. The brigade was involved in the response to the Black Christmas bushfires of 2001, when fires surrounded Mount Riverview, and later sent crews and equipment to assist during the 2003 Canberra bushfires. Mount Riverview is also home to Australian cricketer Pat Cummins.

== Rural fire brigade ==
The Mount Riverview Rural Fire Brigade is the local fire service for the township of Mount Riverview. Mount Riverview is a residential town within the Blue Mountains, 74 kilometres west of Sydney situated within the Blue Mountains National Park. The Mount Riverview Rural Fire Brigade is a Brigade member of the New South Wales Rural Fire Service and was officially started on Thursday 12 December 1968 under the title 'Mount Riverview Bush Fire Brigade' becoming fully operational in 1969. In 1997, the brigade was renamed (following the introduction of the Rural Fires Act) to the Mount Riverview Volunteer Rural Fire Brigade.

The brigade has 30 active, 17 life and a small group of ordinary members. It operates under the administration of the Blue Mountains Rural Fire District operating from the Central East Region.

One of its most notable calls to action was during the Black Christmas bushfires. The Black Christmas were bushfires that burnt for almost three weeks from 24 December 2001 across New South Wales, being the longest continuous bushfire emergency in state history. More than 170 firefighters worked for several days to protect the tiny township of Mount Riverview as it was encircled by bushfires . The brigade also supplied several crews and specialist equipment to assist during the 2003 Canberra bushfires which caused damage to the outskirts of Canberra, the Australian capital city.

The brigade is a participant in the New South Wales Rural Fire Service FireWise program. The brigade has two fire fighting appliances as well as a personnel carrier. Its heaviest vehicle is known as 'Riverview 1', and is a Category 1 (Cat 1) tanker. It falls in the 'heavy appliance' category and is capable of holding 3300 litres of water. The brigade also has a secondary appliance called 'Riverview 7' which is a dual cab Category 7 tanker, and a personnel carrier (callsign 'Riverview PC') which is capable of carrying up to 10 individuals including driver. It also maintains an 'air base operations support trailer' to assist with establishing and running air base operations during operations requiring helicopter support.

Several brigade members are specially trained members that form part of the Remote Area Firefighting Team (RAFT) program and are able to deploy at a moments notice across the state.

== Sports ==
Renegades Basketball team in action 2005

Mount Riverview is home to the Mt Riv Renegades basketball team as part of the Springwood Basketball Association competition. Established in early 2003, the Mt Riv Renegades started as a small basketball team playing in the Springwood and Districts Basketball Association (SDBA) domestic competition at the Blaxland High School Sports Centre. Team members consist of players who have attended Mount Riverview Primary School or who reside or have previously resided in the Mount Riverview area.

Mount Riverview is also the home of test cricketer Patrick Cummins, whose debut in South Africa during November 2011 saw him take six wickets in an innings and hitting the winning runs in a Man of the Match performance.

== Local schools ==
There are six local schools around Mount Riverview. Public schools include:

- Mount Riverview primary
- Blaxland primary
- Blaxland East Public School
- Blaxland High
- Wycliffe Christian School
- St Finbars Catholic Primary School

== Notable residents ==
- Pat Cummins, Australian cricketer and incumbent Test captain
