= Blinky Bill the Movie =

- Theatrical film poster
- Directed by: Deane Taylor
- Screenplay by: Fin Edquist
- Based on: The Complete Adventures of Blinky Bill by Dorothy Wall
- Produced by: Jim Ballantine; Barbara Stephen
- Starring: Ryan Kwanten; Rufus Sewell; Toni Collette; David Wenham; Deborah Mailman; Richard Roxburgh; Robin McLeavy; Barry Otto; Barry Humphries
- Edited by: Simon Klaebe
- Music by: Dale Cornelius
- Production companies: Flying Bark Productions; Telegael Teoranta; Screen Australia; Screen NSW; Assemblage Entertainment
- Distributed by: StudioCanal (Australia); Eclipse Pictures (Ireland and the United Kingdom); Studio 100 Film (international)
- Release dates: 17 September 2015 (Australia); 19 August 2016 (Ireland)
- Running time: 93 minutes
- Countries: Australia; Ireland; India
- Language: English
- Box office: $4.3 million

Blinky Bill the Movie is a 2015 Australian animated adventure comedy film based on the Blinky Bill character created by Dorothy Wall for a children's book series in 1933. The film was produced by Flying Bark Productions and partly distributed and co-produced by Assemblage Entertainment and Telegael. The film was directed by Deane Taylor and written by Fin Edquist. It stars the voices of Ryan Kwanten, Rufus Sewell, Toni Collette, David Wenham, Deborah Mailman, Richard Roxburgh, Robin McLeavy, Barry Otto and Barry Humphries.

== Plot ==
In the town of Greenpatch, a courageous young koala named Blinky Bill tells a story about his father, Mr. Bill while embarking on a journey across the wild, and dangerous Australian outback in the hope of finding him.

Blinky's dad had created their home Greenpatch, where every animal could feel safe and live in peace. Blinky has been influenced by the legend of his father, who is on an adventure to the Sea of White Dragons. When Mayor Cranklepot attempts to dominate Greenpatch and become the ruler, Blinky realises that he must go in search of his father. Throughout his adventure, he befriends a girl koala named Nutsy, a lizard named Jacko, and a few other creatures who assist Blinky on his quest. He discovers that being a hero is complicated and requires teamwork.

== Voice cast ==
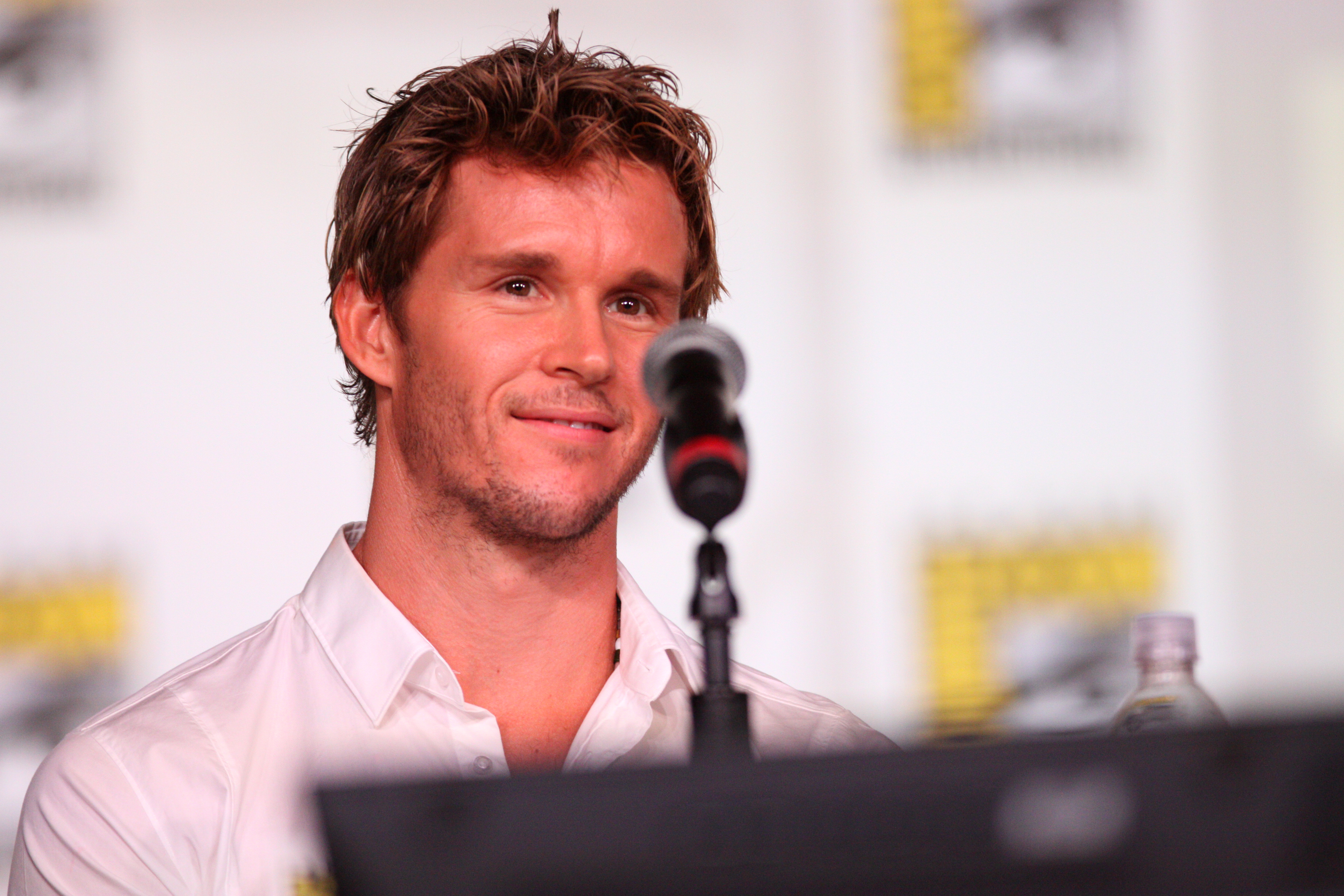
Ryan Kwanten plays the role of voicing Blinky Bill.

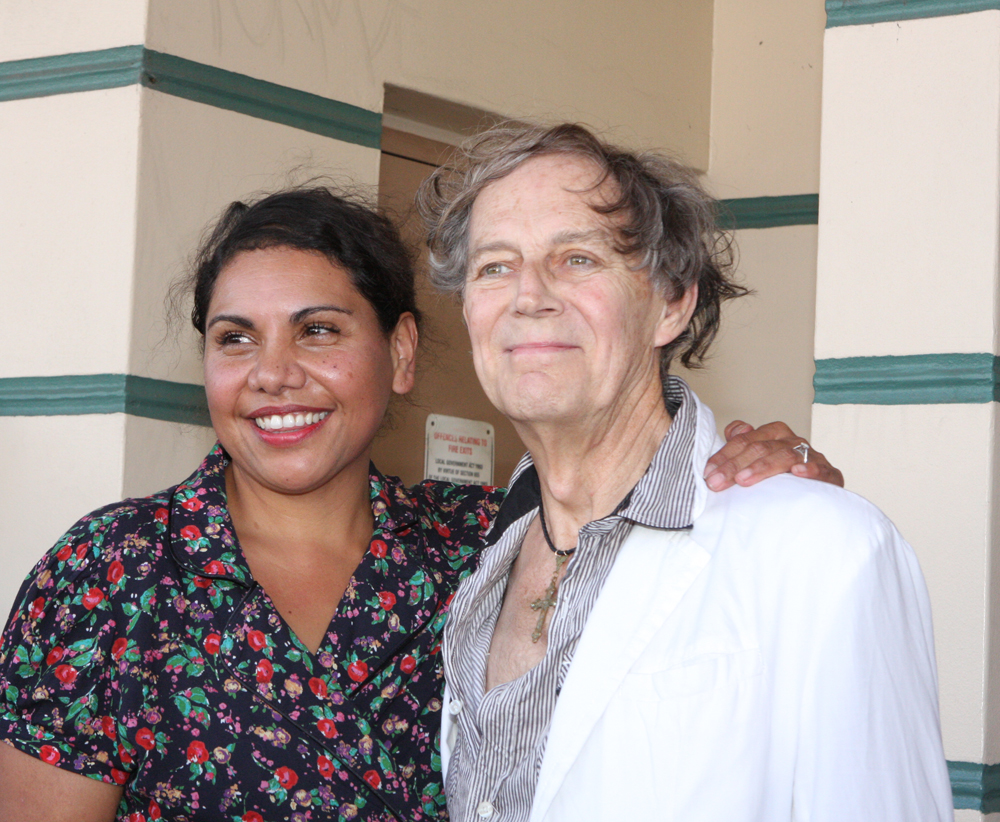
Deborah Mailman (left) voices Blinky's mother, and Barry Otto (right) voices Mayor Cranklepot.

- Ryan Kwanten as Blinky Bill, a mischievous young koala
- Rufus Sewell as Sir Claude, a villainous feral British Shorthair who wants to get revenge against Mr. Bill.
- Toni Collette as Beryl and Cheryl, two emus
- David Wenham as Jacko, a frill-necked lizard
- Deborah Mailman as Mrs. Bill, Blinky's mother
- Richard Roxburgh as Mr. Bill, Blinky's father
- Robin McLeavy as Nutsy, a koala raised in a zoo
- Barry Otto as Mayor Wilberforce Cranklepot, a goanna who rules Greenpatch
- Barry Humphries as Walter, an elderly wombat who is friends with Mr. Bill.
- Tin Pang as Jorge, a featherless sulphur crested cockatoo
- Cameron Ralph as Splodge, a kangaroo and Robert, a lyrebird
- Charlotte Rose Hamlyn as Marcia, a marsupial mouse who is one of Blinky's best friends
- Billy Birmingham as Tony and Richard, a pair of kookaburras who narrate a cricket game
- Steve Cooper as Hans, a man who owns a roadhouse in the outback.
- Tracy Lenon, Ben Wanders, Elif Acehan, and Gabrielle Joosten as the zookeepers.
- Fin Edquist as postman Platypus
- Stephanie Mountzouris as bilbies
- Byron Schepen as crocodiles (uncredited)

== Reception ==
On Rotten Tomatoes the film received generally positive reviews, earning a 73% approval rating, based on reviews from 11 critics.

The book Historical Dictionary of Australian and New Zealand Cinema interpreted the Rotten Tomatoes audience score of 43% as implying that audiences and fans of the original book and the 1990s/2000s animated series had negative reactions to the film.

=== Accolades ===
Award	Category	Subject	Result
Asia Pacific Screen Awards	Best Animated Feature Film	Jim Ballantine & Barbara Stephen	Nominated
Kids' Choice Award	Favorite Voice in an Animated Film	Ryan Kwanten; Robin McLeavy; David Wenham; Rufus Sewell; Toni Collette; Richard Roxburgh; Deborah Mailman; Barry Otto; Barry Humphries	Won
Screen Music Awards	Feature Film Score of the Year	Dale Cornelius	Nominated
Tumbleweeds Film Festival			Nominated

== Television series ==
The film was followed by a 26-episode TV series, The Wild Adventures of Blinky Bill that aired on Seven Network in 2016.
