= Blaxland, New South Wales =

Town in New South Wales, Australia

Blaxland
- Town
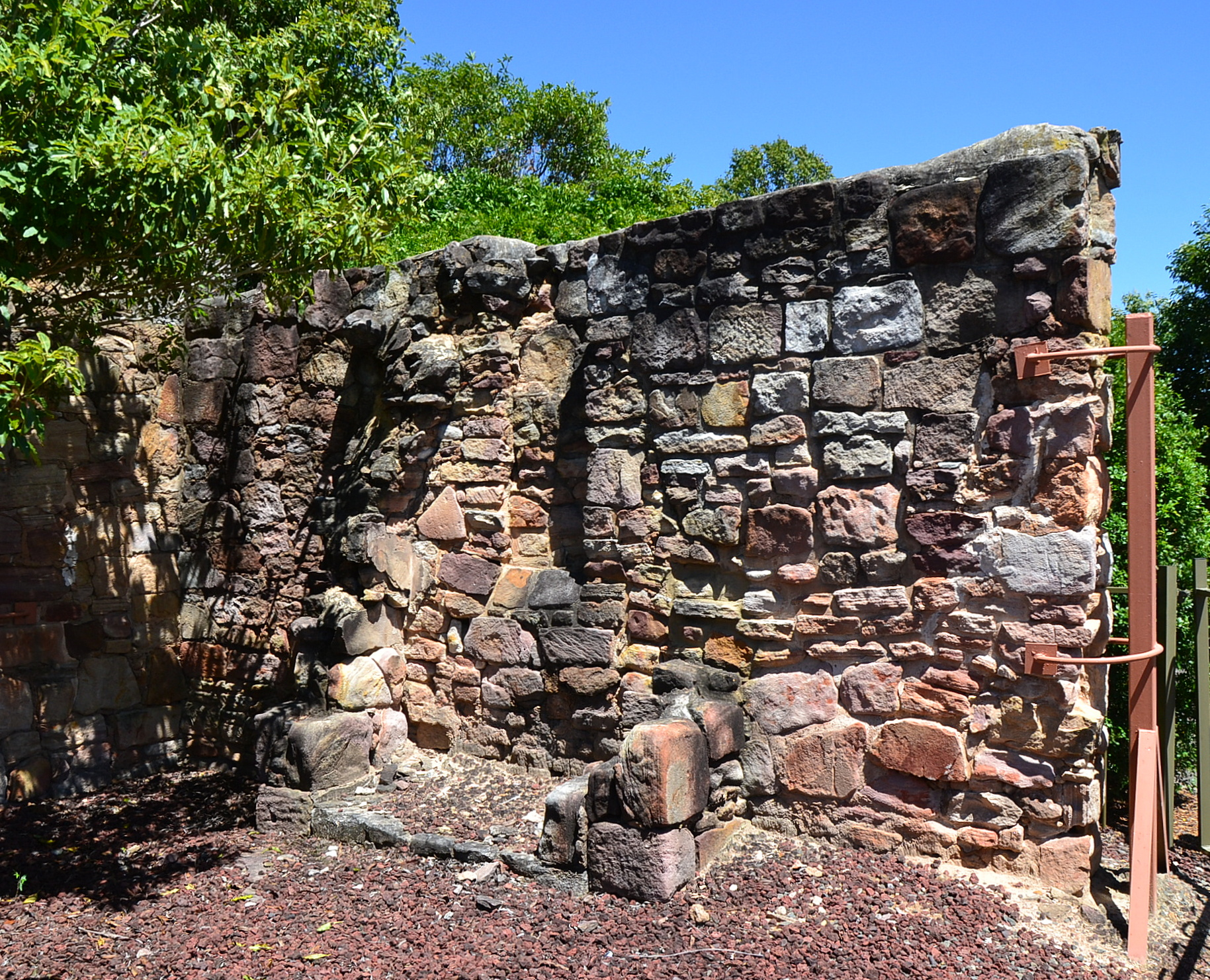
- Remains of Pilgrim Inn, c. 1825

- Interactive map of Blaxland
- Coordinates: 33°45′S 150°37′E
- Country: Australia
- State: New South Wales
- LGA: City of Blue Mountains
- Location: 65 km (40 mi) west of Sydney CBD; 38 km (24 mi) east of Katoomba
- Established: 1830

Government
  - State electorates: Blue Mountains; Penrith
  - Federal division: Macquarie
- Elevation: 234 m (768 ft)

Population
  - Total: 7,434 (2021 census)
- Postcode: 2774
Localities around Blaxland
Warrimoo	Mount Riverview	Emu Heights
	Blaxland
		Glenbrook

Blaxland is a town in the Blue Mountains of New South Wales, Australia. Blaxland is located 65 kilometres west of Sydney in the local government area of the City of Blue Mountains. It is at an altitude of 234 metres and borders the townships of Glenbrook, Mount Riverview and Warrimoo. As of the 2021 Census it has a population of 7,434.

== History ==
Blaxland is named for Gregory Blaxland who along with William Lawson and William Wentworth, led the exploration that discovered a route over the Blue Mountains in 1813. Prior to 1879 the area was known as Wascoe.

The Pilgrim Inn was built c. 1825. It was a significant element in the area for some time, but eventually decayed. The remains, which are now adjacent to McDonald's, are heritage-listed.

The Rev. Joshua Hargrave became a major presence in the area in the early 20th. century, and a significant force in the growth of Blaxland as a village, especially South Blaxland. He built the first church in the area and, with his family and the Calver family, is associated with four homes that still survive: Tanfield in Hope Street, Menahne in Hope Street, Rosedale in View Street and Nardi in View Street. The homes are all heritage-listed.

== Heritage listings ==
Blaxland has a number of heritage listed sites, including:

- Blue Mountains National Park: Blue Mountains walking tracks

== Population ==
According to the 2021 census of Population, there were 7,434 people in Blaxland.

- Aboriginal and Torres Strait Islander people made up 2.6% of the population.
- 82.6% of people were born in Australia. The next most common country of birth was England at 5.0%.
- 91.5% of people spoke only English at home.

In the 2021 Census religious affiliation was as follows:

- Christianity was the most widely professed religion accounting for 53.5% of people.
- The largest Christian denominations were Catholicism (19.5%) and Anglicanism (15.7%).
- People who did not state their religion accounted for 3.4% and 41.4% professed no religion.

== Transport ==
Blaxland railway station is on the Blue Mountains Line of the NSW TrainLink intercity network. It is a disability-accessible station.

== Commercial area ==
The village of Blaxland received a major overhaul in 2001 with the widening of the Great Western Highway. This work included the controversial planting of Canary Island Palm trees along the highway, but also created space for more shops and led to many refurbishments. These changes, combined with the upgrade of Blaxland Station, have improved business in Blaxland.

Blaxland also has a small industrial estate and the only remaining land fill waste facility in the Blue Mountains.

== Services ==
- Blue Mountains Library branch, Hope Street
- Blaxland Rural Fire Brigade falls under the jurisdiction of the statewide Rural Fire Service

== Schools ==
- Blaxland High School
- Blaxland East Public School
- Blaxland Public School

== Sport and recreation ==
=== Bushwalking tracks ===
Blaxland includes the Florabella Pass track, which leads to Glenbrook, and the Pippas Pass track, leading to a pool on Glenbrook Creek. The Lennox Bridge (Lapstone Hill) and Knapsack Viaduct are to the north and can be accessed by Mitchell's Pass.

=== Blaxland Redbacks Soccer and Netball Clubs ===
Blaxland is home to the Blaxland Redbacks soccer and netball teams.

The Soccer team was established in 1965 and resides at the home ground of St. Johns Oval, Blaxland. St. Johns Oval was named after the local St. Johns Ambulance Brigade who original donated the land for the soccer fields to the club.

=== Wascoe Siding miniature railway ===
The Wascoe Siding is a miniature railway established in 1964 by John Green. It is a conversion of a disused railway cutting from the railway line for Glenbrook Station, then named Wascoe Siding. Today it serves as spot for hobbyists and historians for miniature trains.

=== Scouts club ===
Blaxland is also the home of the 1st Blaxland Scout group.

== Gallery ==
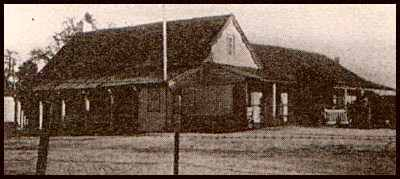
Pilgrim Inn, c. 1920s

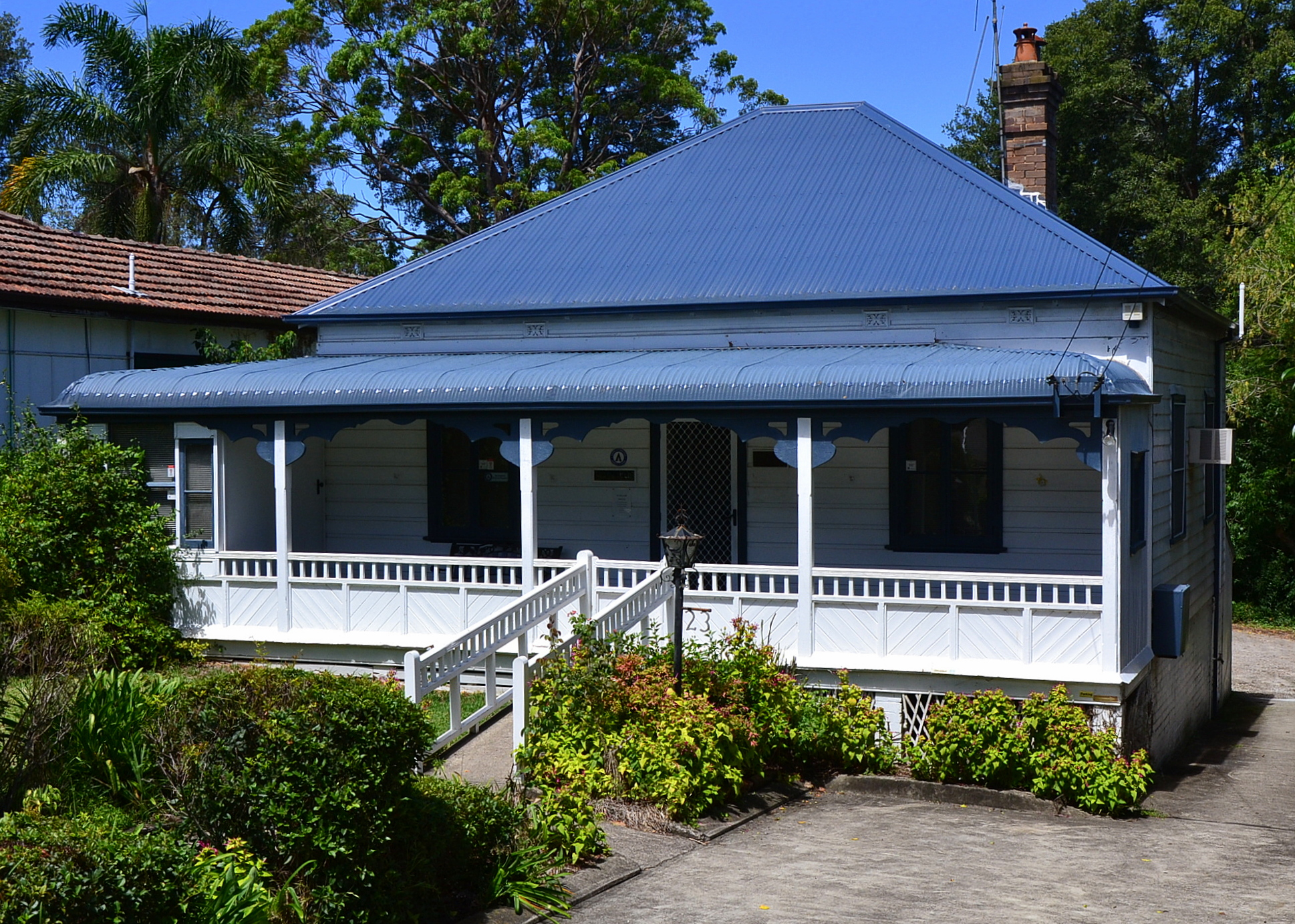
Tanfield, part of a heritage-listed group of homes in Hope and View Streets

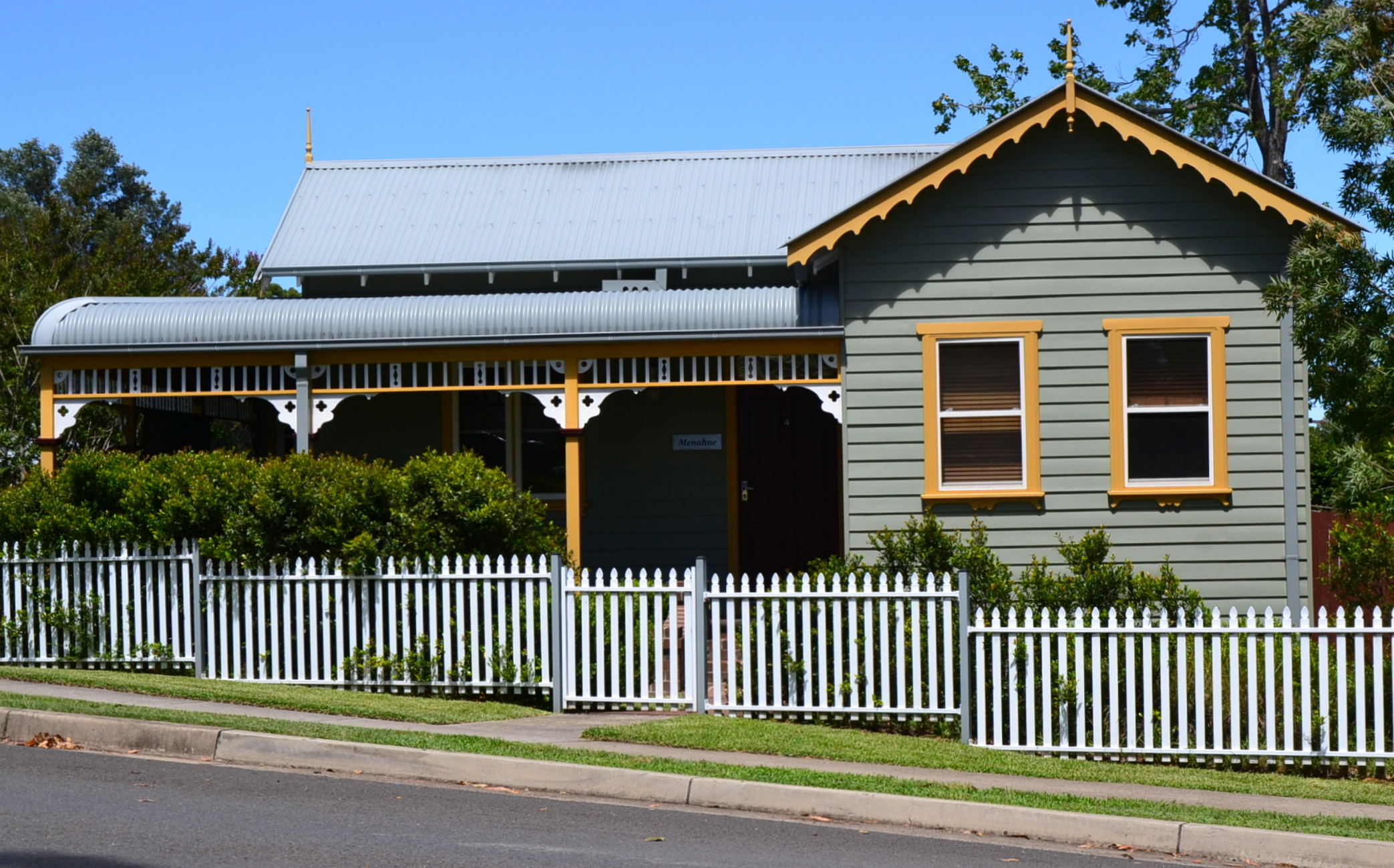
Menahne, a heritage-listed home in Hope Street

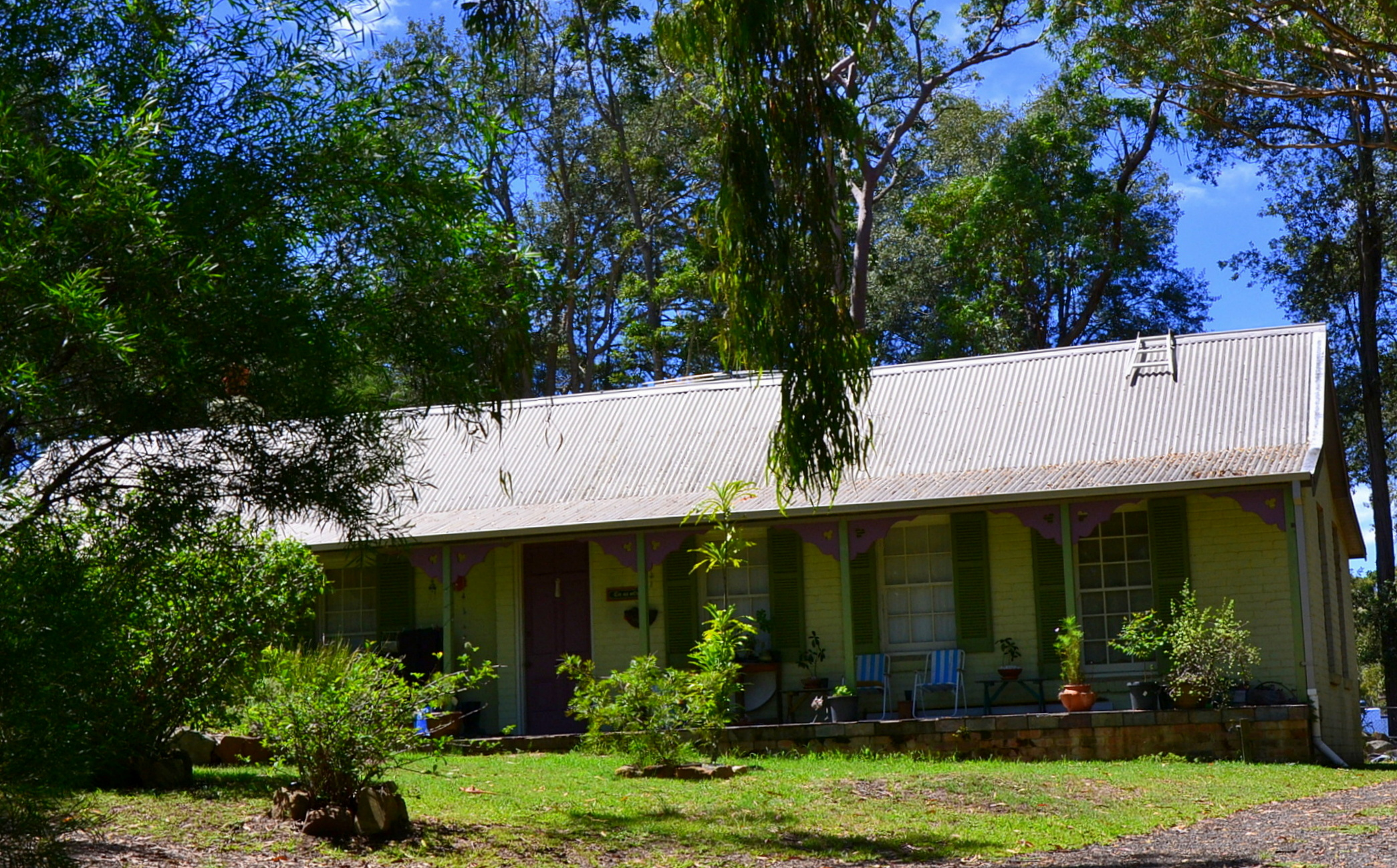
Rosedale, a heritage-listed home in View Street

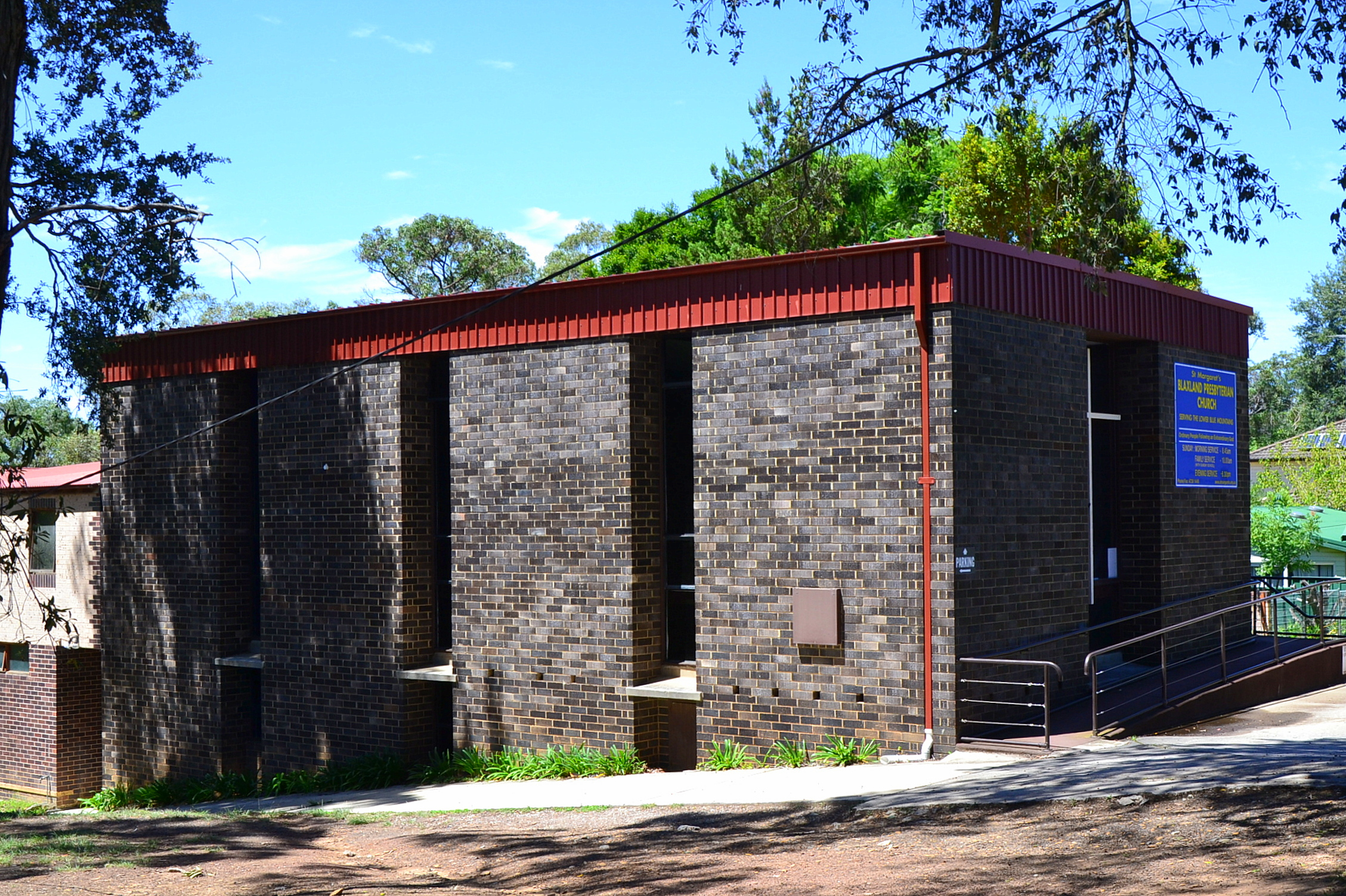
Blaxland Presbyterian Church, Wilson Way
