= Richie Conroy =

Irish scriptwriter and actor

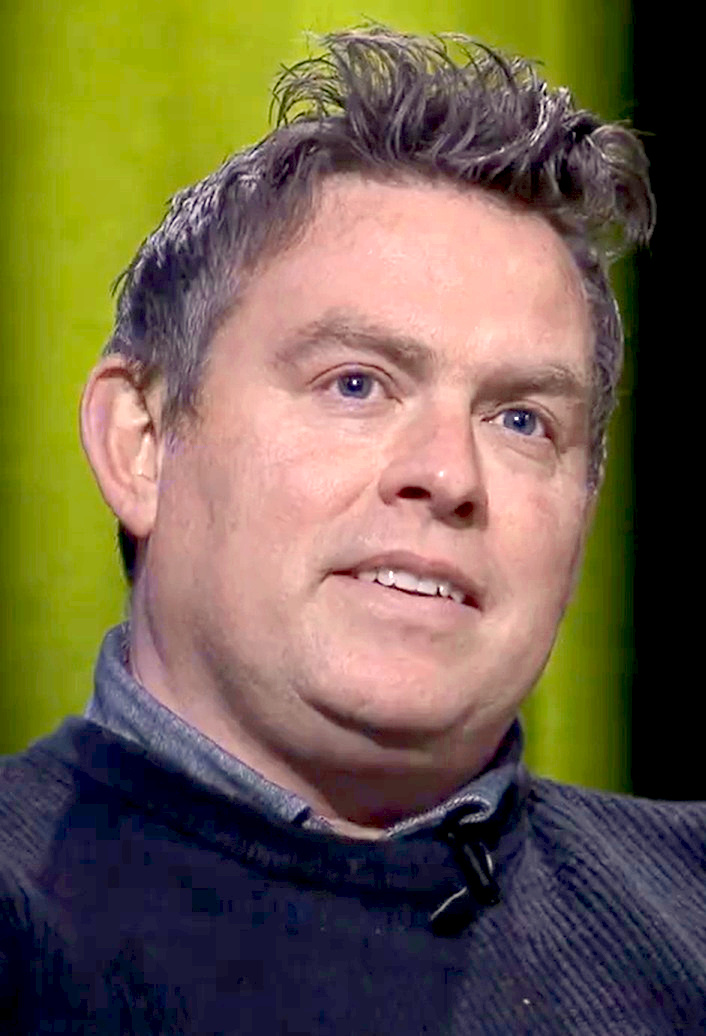
Richie Conroy in 2025

Richie Conroy is an Irish screenwriter and novelist who works on television and films for young people on Disney, RTÉ, BBC and TG4. His first novel was Dialann Emily Porter: An Jailtacht (LeabhairCOMHAR). His short stories have been published in the book Saibhreas (Mentor Press). He has received national and international recognition and awards for his work. He is from Kildare, his father is Don Conroy, he was a writer-in-residence at Dublin City University in 2021.

== Dialann Emily Porter: Thíos Seal Thuas Seal ==
This is a story about Emily, a happy girl, she is in transition year and is dating a boy and there is a new teacher at school who is encouraging, kind and very handsome. But things soon start to go wrong for her and she has problems to solve. On top of that, Emily's parents have a secret that will change her life completely.

Emily Porter's Diary: Down Above Above Above won first prize in the A3: Fiction for Young People (13–15) Competition in the Oireachtas Literary Competitions in 2020. It was published by LeabhairCOMHAR in 2021. and was shortlisted for the 2022 Réics Carló Award.

== Screenwriting work ==
- 2004 Foreign Exchange
- 2007 Zombie Hotel
- 2009 Gawayn
- 2009-2012 Roy
- 2011-2018 The Wild Adventures of Blinky Bill
- 2013-2016 Fair City
- 2015 Two by Two
- 2016 Zig and Zag
- 2017-2019 Drop Dead Weird
- 2018 Becca's Bunch
- 2020 Malory Towers
- 2022-2025 Fia's Fairies
- 2023 Lu & the Bally Bunch
- 2024 Crá
- 2024 Louise Lives Large
- 2025 Fran: Assistant Manager
