= Crá =

2024 Irish-language television series

- Genre: Murder mystery
- Screenplay by: Doireann Ní Chorragáin; Richie Conroy
- Directed by: Phillip Doherty
- Starring: Alex Murphy; Dónall Ó Héalai; Hannah Brady; Roisin Murphy; Barry McGovern
- Country of origin: Ireland
- Original languages: Irish; English
- No. of series: 1
- No. of episodes: 6

Production
- Executive producers: Darach Ó Tuairisg; Karen Kirby; Máire Ní Chonláin
- Producer: Ciarán Charles
- Running time: 46 minutes
- Production companies: Fíbín Media; Zoogon

Original release
- Network: TG4
- Release: 11 November 2024 – present

Crá (Irish for Torment, translated as “Boglands”) is an Irish murder mystery television series. It premiered on TG4 on 11 November 2024, BBC Northern Ireland on 17 November 2024 and BBC Four on 11 January 2025.

== Synopsis ==
A body discovered in an Irish bog is identified as the missing mother of a Garda (policeman) who is then forbidden to join in the investigation. Meanwhile, a local journalist begins a podcast to look into his mother’s disappearance 15 years earlier.

== Cast ==
- Alex Murphy as Garda Barry Roache
- Dónall Ó Héalai as Garda Conall Ó Súilleabháin
- Hannah Brady as Ciara-Kate
- Roisin Murphy as Annemarie
- Barry McGovern as Art Ó Súilleabháin
- Tara Breathnach as Cigire Patsy Sweeney
- Caoimhe Farren as Ceannfort Sorcha Conlon
- Alan Mahon as Bleachtaire Cathal Keogh
- Niall Mac Eachmharcaigh as Ray

== Production ==
The six-part first series was written by Doireann Ní Chorragáin and Richie Conroy and directed by Philip Doherty. It was produced by Fíbín Media and Zoogon for BBC Gaeilge and TG4. Executive producers are Darach Ó Tuairisg for Fíbín Media, Karen Kirby for BBC Northern Ireland and Máire Ní Chonláin for TG4. Ciarán Charles was a producer for TG4. Crá is an Irish-language word meaning "torment", and the writers said they were moved by the accounts of some of Ireland's unsolved cases.

The cast was led by stars Dónall Ó Héalai, Alex Murphy, Hannah Brady, Barry McGovern, Róisín Murphy, Tara Breathnach, Caoimhe Farren and Alan Mahon.

The six-part series was filmed in County Donegal. In November 2025, it was renewed for a second series, for which filming took place in Gaoth Dobhair, Co Donegal.

== Broadcast ==
The series premiered on TG4 on 11 November 2024. The series began airing on BBC Northern Ireland on 17 November 2024 and on BBC Four on 11 January 2025. The series was later sold to 68 countries under the international title Boglands.

== Soundtrack ==
The original music was composed by Krismenn.

== Reception ==
Ed Power in The Irish Times said that "Donegal is utilised wonderfully in the script" and whilst the series does "utilise cliches" it is "put together with genuine verve".

It was nominated for Best Drama at the Irish Film and Television Awards in January 2025.
