= Sun Valley, New South Wales =

Coordinates: 31°55′54″S 150°57′04″E

Sun Valley
- Suburb
- Interactive map of Sun Valley
- Country: Australia
- State: New South Wales
- LGA: City of Blue Mountains
- First Peoples: Dharug; Gundungurra

Population
  - Total: 234 (2021)
Suburbs around Sun Valley
Springwood	Springwood	Yellow Rock
Valley Heights	Sun Valley	Yellow Rock
Valley Heights	Warrimoo	Warrimoo

Sun Valley is an address locality in the state of New South Wales, Australia in the City of Blue Mountains. The area known as Sun Valley lies between Warrimoo and Valley Heights in the lower mountains and has a wealth of historical and geological significance.

Dating from the early Jurassic period, this extinct volcanic vent was inhabited by local Aboriginal Australians for thousands of years. Dharug and Gundungurra people were thought to have originally crossed and occupied the area. Stone artefacts and cave art have been found in the valley.

Sun Valley, named so in the 1960s to coincide with the residential subdivision, has also over time been known as The Valley, Fitzgerald’s Valley, Valley Flats and Deane’s Valley and was used in the 1800s as a vital stopover for explorers crossing the Great Dividing Range. The creeks, rich soil, open forest and native grassland environment was ideal for the farming, grazing and logging conducted in these times. The valley was once roamed by wild brumbies and is renowned for its magnificent stands of mountain blue gum trees, pretty setting and walking tracks in and around Long Angle Gully and the historical “Warrimoo Pool” site. European relics dating back to the early 1800s are known to exist around the mountains. In the mid 1900s the area was heavily used by bushwalking clubs and scout groups.

To this day Sun Valley remains a small, semi-rural community incorporating a pony club, a local produce store and supporting a vital fire trail system used to protect the area.
