= Barry McGovern =

Irish stage, film and television actor (born 1948)

- Education: Castleknock College
- Occupation: Actor
- Years active: 1978–present

Barry McGovern is an Irish stage, film, and television actor.

== Early life and education ==
Barry McGovern was educated at Castleknock College, Dublin.

== Career ==
McGovern is a former member of the RTÉ Players and the Abbey Theatre Company. He has worked in theatre, film, radio and television, as well as written music for many shows, and co-written two musicals and directed plays and operas.

He is known internationally for his award-winning one-man Beckett shows I'll Go On and Watt, which the Gate Theatre presented at the 1985 and 2010 Dublin Theatre Festival respectively. McGovern revived I'll Go On for a run at the Kirk Douglas Theatre in Culver City for L.A.'s Center Theatre Group in 2014.

== Filmography ==
Film
Year	Title	Role	Notes
1987	Riders to the Sea	Bartley	
1990	Joe Versus the Volcano	Luggage Salesman	
1991	Billy Bathgate	Father McInerny	
1992	Far and Away	McGuire	
1995	Braveheart	King's Advisor	
1996	The Disappearance of Finbar	Action Committee Chairman	
1997	Driftwood	McTavish	
1997	The Informant	Courtroom Judge	TV movie
1998	The General	IRA Man 1	
1999	Felicia's Journey	Gatherer	
2001	Waiting for Godot	Vladimir	
2015	My Name Is Emily	Dr. Golding	
2018	Penance	The Commandant (Old Antaine)	Irish language
2024	Blue Fiddle		Irish language
Television
Year	Title	Role	Notes
1979	Play for Today	Sean	1 episode
1984	Caught in a Free State	Éamon de Valera	4 episodes
1987	Foreign Bodies	Dermot #1	TV movie
1990	Dear Sarah	Giuseppe Conlon	TV movie
1991	The Treaty	Éamon de Valera	TV movie
1995	The Governor	Solicitor	1 episode
1995–96	Finbar's Class	Mannix Beatty	24 episodes
1998	Ballykissangel	Con Casey	1 episode
1998	Miracle at Midnight	Rabbi Ben Abrams	1 episode
2007	The Tudors	Bishop Bonnivet	2 episodes
2008	School Run	Padraig Ó Cinnéide	2 episodes
2010	Na Cloigne	Ceannfort Ó Sé	3 episodes
2010	An Crisis	Piaras De Barra	Irish language; 1 episode
2014	Game of Thrones	Dying Man	Episode: "Mockingbird"
2016	Vikings	French Archbishop	1 episode
2021	Foundation	Orlio	1 episode
2024	Crá	Art Ó Súilleabháin	Irish language; All 6 episodes

== Awards and nominations ==
- 2012: Nominated, Lead Actor in a Play in the Ovation Awards, for the role of Vladimir in the Center Theatre Group production of Waiting For Godot
