= Warrimoo railway station =

Railway station in New South Wales, Australia

Warrimoo
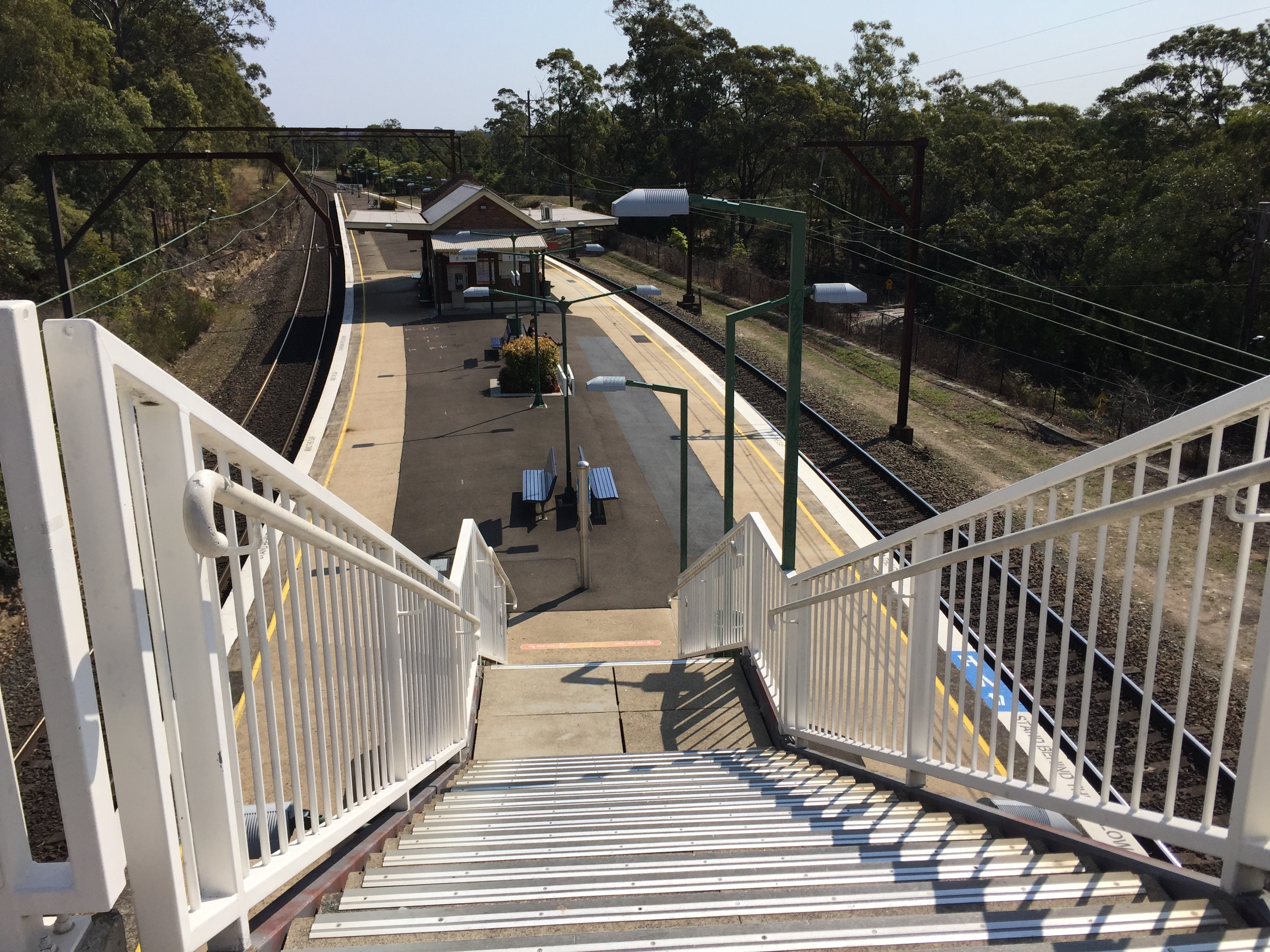
- Station platform, building and stairs viewed from footbridge, September 2018

General information
- Location: Railway Parade, Warrimoo; Australia
- Coordinates: 33°43′16″S 150°36′08″E
- Elevation: 275 metres (902 ft)
- Owner: Transport Asset Manager of New South Wales
- Operator: Sydney Trains
- Line: Main Western
- Distance: 74.30 kilometres (46.17 mi) from Central
- Platforms: 2 (1 island)
- Tracks: 2
- Connections: Bus

Construction
- Structure type: Ground
- Parking: 35 spaces
- Accessible: No

Other information
- Status: Weekdays: Staffed: 6am to 10am: Weekends and public holidays: Unstaffed
- Station code: WRM
- Website: Transport for NSW

History
- Opened: 9 March 1918

Passengers
- 2025: 53,349 (year); 146 (daily) (Sydney Trains)

Services
Preceding station	Intercity Trains	Following station
Valley Heights towards Lithgow	Blue Mountains Line	Blaxland towards Central
Location

Warrimoo railway station is a heritage-listed railway station located on the Main Western line in New South Wales, Australia. It serves the Blue Mountains suburb of Warrimoo opening on 9 March 1918.

== History ==
While the Great Western Railway was built through the Blue Mountains in 1867, it was originally established in the area as Karabar platform. After a name change a new platform was built in 1918. This platform was later destroyed as a result of bush fire in 1951 and was later rebuilt.

A pedestrian bridge was built in 1917 to provide access to the station and in 1990 alterations were made.

The station celebrated its 100th anniversary on 9 March 2018.

== Platforms and services ==
Warrimoo has one island platform with two sides. It is serviced by Sydney Trains Blue Mountains Line services travelling from Sydney Central to Lithgow.

Platform	Line	Stopping pattern	Notes
1	Blue Mountains Line	services to Sydney Central	
2	Blue Mountains Line	services to Springwood, Katoomba, Mount Victoria & Lithgow	

== Transport links ==
Blue Mountains Transit operates one bus route via Warrimoo station, under contract to Transport for NSW:

- 690P: Springwood station to Penrith station
