= Emu Heights, New South Wales =

Emu Heights
- Suburb
- Interactive map of Emu Heights
- Country: Australia
- State: New South Wales
- City: Sydney
- LGA: City of Penrith
- Location: 58 km (36 mi) W of Sydney
- Established: 1831

Government
  - State electorate: Penrith
  - Federal division: Macquarie

Area
  - Total: 3.44 km^{2} (1.33 sq mi)
- Elevation: 74 m (243 ft)

Population
  - Total: 3,205 (2021 census)
  - Density: 931.7/km^{2} (2,413/sq mi)
- Postcode: 2750
Suburbs around Emu Heights
Mount Riverview	Castlereagh	Penrith
Mount Riverview	Emu Heights	Emu Plains
Blaxland	Glenbrook	Emu Plains

Emu Heights is a suburb of Sydney, in the state of New South Wales, Australia. Emu Heights is located 58 kilometres west of the Sydney central business district, in the local government area of the City of Penrith.

Emu Heights sits on the land of the Dharug people, who are the traditional owners of the area.

Sitting on the base of the Blue Mountains escarpment and on the western side of the Nepean river, the suburb is just outside the Sydney metropolitan area.

It is bounded to the north by the Nepean River, to the east (at Russell St) and south (at Great Western Railway) by the suburb of Emu Plains and to the west by the City of Blue Mountains local government area.

== History ==
The Dharug people inhabited the land now known as Emu Heights and are the traditional owners of the land.

Emu Heights was established by George Innes, a free settler from Bathurst who obtained 400 acres (1.6 km^{2}) in 1831, near McCann's Island and named it Emu Heights. However, the name "Emu Heights" wasn't officially assigned to the neighbourhood until early 1976.

== Schools ==
Emu Heights Public School was founded in 1972. The school had only eighty seven pupils and three teachers, but now has over three hundred students enrolled. The school's teaching revolves around seven Key Learning Areas, English, Mathematics, Science, ICT, Human society and its environment, the Creative Arts and Personal Health and Social Development.

== Parks ==
Clissold Park is host to a wide variety of diversity of Australia's fauna and flora and features basketball, netball and children's playground facilities. The park does not have formal field sporting facilities but is more than large enough for such and regularly used by the close knit people of Emu Heights for community events. There is a mellow stream that flows down from the mountain escarpment, though this stream has been recorded to flood the whole park and North along Wedmore Rd in major storms. (The stream was diverted East by housing developers in the 1980s who followed a farmers drainage channel rather than the original flow North beside Wedmore Rd to the Nepean river).

A larger unnamed parkland also exists at the north end of Emu Heights, between the suburb and the Nepean River, giving wide access to the river. Sporting fields and golf facilities are being considered for this parkland. Fishing and canoeing are popular as this section of the river is not used by power boats. The section of river accessible from Emu Heights is home to a large variety of native and migratory waterbirds. In the early 1960s, the native egg laying mammal the platypus could still be found in this section of the river but has since become extinct.

== Population ==
According to the 2021 census of Population, there were 3,205 people in Emu Heights.

- Aboriginal and Torres Strait Islander people made up 3.3% of the population.
- 84.9% of people were born in Australia. The next most common country of birth was England at 4.0%.
- 92.4% of people spoke only English at home.
- The most common responses for religion were No Religion 36.6%, Catholic 28.8% and Anglican 17.1%.
- The most common ancestries were Australian 43.8%, English 39.3%, Irish 13.6%, Scottish 11.2% and German 4.4%.
- Of occupied private dwellings in Emu Heights, 97.3% were separate houses.
