= Blaxland High School =

Location
- Blaxland, New South Wales; Australia; 33°45′18″S 150°36′36″E

Information
- School type: Government-operated comprehensive secondary school
- Motto: A School of Excellence, Opportunity and Success
- Established: 1977
- School district: Regional North
- Educational authority: NSW Department of Education
- Principal: Emma Le Marquand
- Teaching staff: 73.2 FTE (2025)
- Years: 7–12
- Enrolment: 998 (2025)
- Campus type: Suburban
- Colours: Blue, white and red
- Website: blaxland-h.schools.nsw.gov.au

Blaxland High School is a government-operated comprehensive secondary school located in Blaxland, a suburb in the Blue Mountains region of New South Wales, Australia.

Established in 1977, the school enrolled approximately 1,000 students in 2018, from Year 7 to Year 12, of whom four percent identified as Indigenous Australians and eleven percent were from a language background other than English. The school is operated by the NSW Department of Education.

== Sexual assault case ==
In 2019 a Music teacher, David Leishman was found guilty of sexually touching another person. At the time, the pupil was 15 years old. Leishman was sentenced to 12 months in prison in April at Penrith District Court on the touching charges, with a nine-month non-parole period. On the kissing accusation, he was sentenced to 13 months in prison with a nine-month non-parole period.

== Chemical spill incident ==
In February 2019, the school was evacuated after a hazardous chemical spill that occurred in the Science Lab store room. Calcium Carbide powder is highly explosive if contacted with water, resulting in the school being evacuated as a precaution by the St Mary's Fire and Rescue NSW team who responded to the incident. There were no injuries to teachers or students.

== Cars for Refugees ==
In 2018, Shaun Halden's Industrial Arts class set out on a project to rebuild cars that were donated to the school that would then be donated to refugee families. Halden was introduced to the project by the Blue Mountains Refugee Support Group, which was hoping to find cars for refugees in need, and Halden set to get his students involved.

== Notable alumni ==
- Jessica Fox – Bronze Medal Winner 2016 Summer Olympics, Silver Medal Winner 2012 Summer Olympics, Gold Medal Winner 2020 Summer Olympics and 2024 Summer Olympics
- Noemie Fox – Bronze Medal Winner – Under 23 Canoe Slalom World Championships, Gold Medal Winner 2024 Summer Olympics
- Amanda Reid – NAIDOC Sportsperson of the Year, two-time Paralympian and silver medalist
- Peter Wallace – professional rugby league footballer
- Adam Giles – former Chief Minister of the Northern Territory (2013–2016)
- Jordan Silk – Cricketer who is captain of the Tasmanian Tigers Sheffield Shield team, and number 5 batsman for the Sydney Sixers T20 team.
- Melissa McIntosh – Australian Liberal Party politician
- Dominic Purcell - Australian Actor
