= Blinky Bill =

Children's book by Dorothy Wall

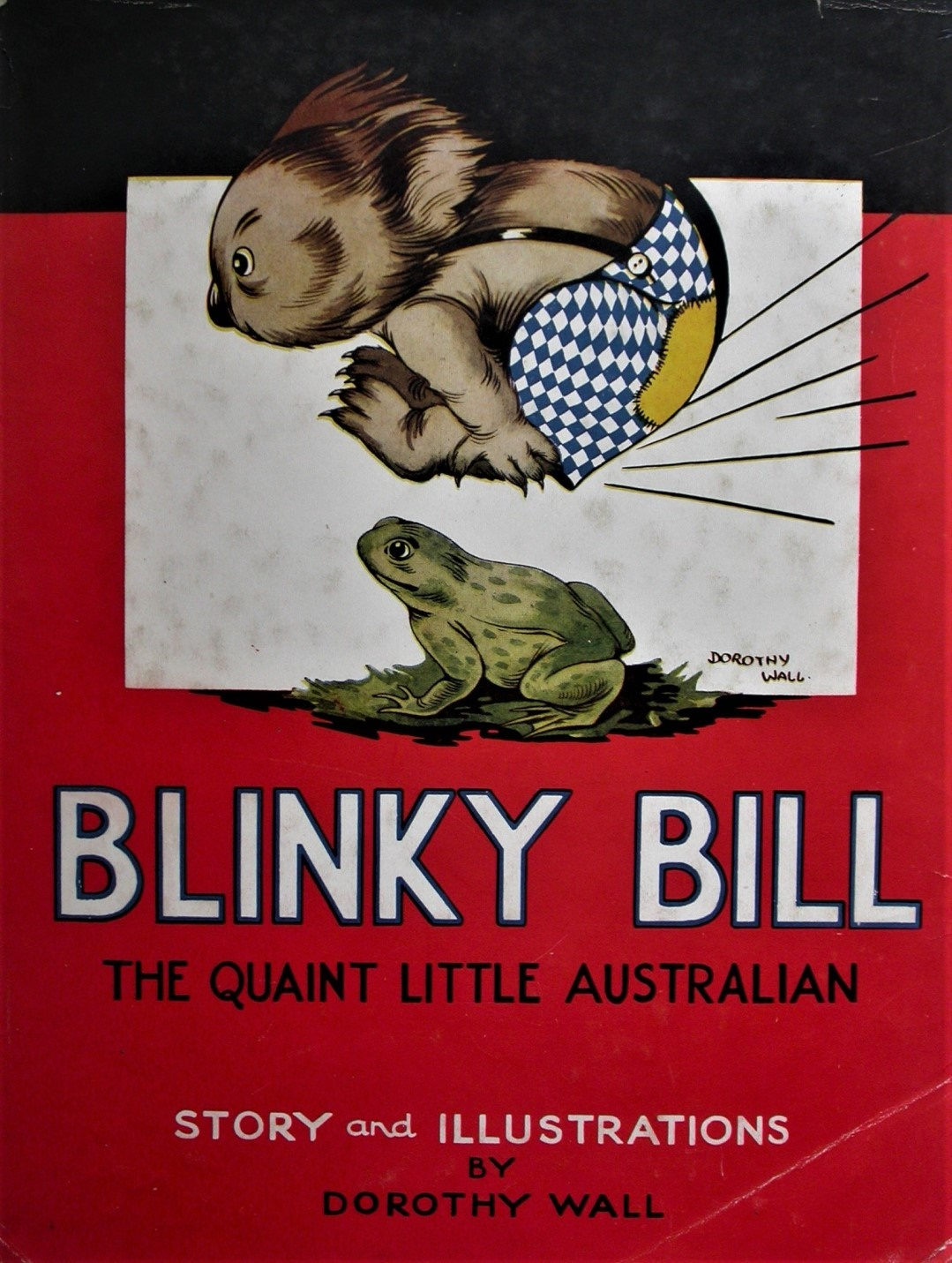
- 1937 cover of Blinky Bill: The Quaint Little Australian by Dorothy Wall
- Author: Dorothy Wall
- Language: English
- Genre: Children's literature
- Published: 1933 Angus & Robertson
- Publication place: Australia
- Media type: Illustrated audiobook

Blinky Bill is an anthropomorphic koala and children's fictional character created by author and illustrator Dorothy Wall. The character first appeared alongside a kookaburra in a picture book by naturalist Brooke Nicholl illustrated by Wall, Jacko, the Broadcasting Kookaburra — His Life and Adventures (1933). Wall then featured Blinky Bill in a series of her own books, including Blinky Bill: The Quaint Little Australian (1933), Blinky Bill Grows Up (1934), and Blinky Bill and Nutsy: Two Little Australians (1937). The books are considered quintessential Australian children's classics, and have never been out of print in Australia.

== Themes and writing style ==
While telling the adventures of Blinky Bill, a cheeky little boy in the form of a koala, the stories also present messages of conservation. Blinky Bill is known for his mischievousness and his love for his mother. His friends include his supposed girlfriend Nutsy, his kangaroo friend Splodge, and his mentor Mr. Wombat, or 'Wombo', as Blinky prefers to call him. In general, throughout the stories, he does things that are realistic for koalas as well as things that child readers would like to do. Wall tells the stories directly to the children and Blinky often interacts with the readers in an introduction. Her dedications are often to 'All the Kind Children', with her own son Peter and other common Australian names of the 1930s appearing. The books are also fully illustrated by Dorothy Wall herself.

== History ==
The first book, Blinky Bill: The Quaint Little Australian, was published in 1933 by Angus & Robertson and was based on stories told to her only child, Peter. The book is 69 pages long, with 15 pages of illustrations. The second book, Blinky Bill Grows Up, was published in 1934 and is 82 pages long with 16 pages of illustrations. The third book, Blinky Bill and Nutsy: Two Little Australians, was published in 1937 and is 115 pages long with 22 pages of illustrations. The Complete Adventures of Blinky Bill, first published in 1939, was reprinted 26 times between 1940 and 1965.

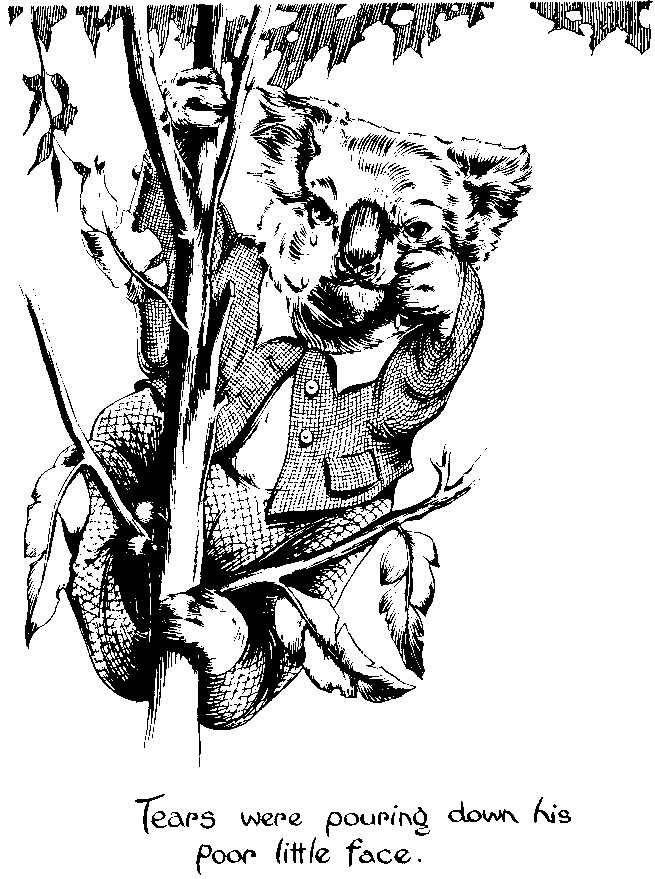
Blinky Bill's father illustration

Wall drew Blinky Bill comic strips, most notably one in 1937 called Blinky Bill's Escapades, which told of the adventures of Blinky, Nutsy and Splodge as they left Australia for the coronation of King George VI and Queen Elizabeth. Angus & Robertson made plates of four strips to entice publishers, but, after considerable procrastination, The Sydney Morning Herald turned it down. She persisted with the Herald for years along with The Sunday Telegraph. Wall also drew some full-page strips, in full colour, of Blinky Bill, Splodge and friends in the army, called Our Squad. Largely because of the cost and rarity of paper during the war, none was ever published.

In 1940, Wall decided her priority was a new Blinky Bill book with Angus & Robertson. In a letter to her publisher, she wrote: "I'll have to do my utmost to get a new Blinky book out for next Christmas. I could do a good story with Blinky on National Service, providing the war continues – but I am not that wicked to wish such a thing". In February she sent her publisher the completed text for Blinky Bill Joins the Army. The publisher was unimpressed by her story of Blinky as an enlisted soldier, calling it 'heavy going' and a too obvious exploitation of 'patriotic fervour'. Wall apparently tore up the manuscript and wrote an entirely new version where Blinky remains in his familiar bush setting until the final pages then goes off to join the army – as a mascot. The new version was finished by the end of April, less than a month after the first had been rejected; it was published for Christmas 1940.

In December 1942 the Blinky Bill's Dress-Up Book was published by Offset Printing Company, which was released after Wall's death, in January the same year. This was followed in 1947 by Blinky Bill's ABC Book and A Tiny Story of Blinky Bill, also published by Offset. In 1971, Angus & Robertson published Blinky Bill and the Rabbit's Birthday Party, based on Dorothy Wall's Complete Adventures of Blinky Bill, which was adapted by Carol Odell and illustrated by Walter Stackpool. In 1977 Angus & Robertson published the Blinky Bill Cookbook, a series of recipes for children to make for themselves by Mary Coleman, which included Wall's original illustrations redrawn by Trevor Hood.

== Adaptations and cultural references ==
Blinky Bill has been adapted for television and cinema. The first television series, titled The New Adventures of Blinky Bill, aired in the 1980s on ABC TV and combined live-action actors with puppetry for the animal characters. The franchise was also made into an animated film, Blinky Bill: The Mischievous Koala, released by Yoram Gross Films Studio in 1992. The following year, a second television series was aired, The Adventures of Blinky Bill. This was also produced by Yoram Gross, with the series acting as a sequel to their film, and ran for three seasons, with the first two airing on ABC in 1993 and 1995 respectively, and the third originally airing on Seven Network in 2004, before being rerun on ABC along with the first two seasons in the late 2000s and early 2010s. The Yoram Gross series is by far the most well-known incarnation of the franchise, both in its native Australia, and internationally.

A CGI film based on the series, Blinky Bill the Movie, was released in 2015, produced as a coproduction between Screen Australia, Flying Bark Productions (being a rebranded Yoram Gross), Assemblage Entertainment and Studio 100 Animation, and featured an all-star cast, including Ryan Kwanten, Robin McLeavy, Richard Roxburgh, Deborah Mailman, Barry Otto, Rufus Sewell, Toni Collette, David Wenham and Barry Humphries. The film was financially successful enough to gain a follow-up TV series of its own, The Wild Adventures of Blinky Bill, that began airing in 2016 on Seven Network, and ran for one season.

"Blinky Bill" is also the nickname of the light at the top of Sydney Harbour Bridge.

In 1985, a postage stamp honouring both Blinky and Dorothy Wall herself was issued by Australia Post as part of a set of five commemorating children's books.

In 1986, Australian singer John Williamson released a single titled "Goodbye Blinky Bill", in order to raise awareness of decline in koala numbers in Australia.

In 1993, the same year that the Yoram Gross series debuted, the Australian republican movement used the character as a symbol in the referendum the following year.

== Reception ==
Blinky Bill received critical acclaim, and has become a national icon for Australia. Both the books and TV series are recognised internationally and regarded as children's classics.
