= Wycliffe Christian School =

Location
- 133 Rickard Road, Warrimoo, Blue Mountains, New South Wales; Australia; 33°43′15″S 150°36′55″E

Information
- Former name: John Wycliffe Christian School
- Type: Independent co-educational early learning, primary and secondary day school
- Motto: Remember Your Creator
- Denomination: Non-denominational Christian
- Established: 1976; 50 years ago
- Educational authority: NSW Department of Education
- Principal: David Johnston
- Grades: Early learning and K–12
- Enrolment: 500
- Slogan: Encouraging learning founded on God's Word
- Website: www.wycliffe.nsw.edu.au

The Wycliffe Christian School (abbreviated as WCS) is an independent non-denominational Christian co-educational early learning, primary and secondary day school, located in Warrimoo, in the Blue Mountains region of New South Wales, Australia.

== History ==
The Wycliffe Christian School started in 1976 as a small school of 28 students based in a church hall in Warrimoo. It then also made use of a church hall in Mt Riverview until 1979 when the whole school moved into the Warrimoo campus in Rickard Road. It was originally called John Wycliffe Christian School, named after John Wycliffe, the man who translated the bible from Latin to English in 1382. Since moving to the Warrimoo location, the school has had six major renovations, the last of which being the construction of a multi million dollar Administration Office in 2013. Under the first principal, Geoff Wheaton, the school grew steadily. Robert Johnston replaced Geoff Wheaton as principal in 1978 and the school continued to grow. Geoff Bowser replaced Robert Johnston in 2005. Geoff Bowser was replaced in 2015 by Peter Jamieson. Two interim principals in 2017 were George Granville, then Kathy Pereira. The current principal, David Johnston, began in 2018. In 2008 Wycliffe opened their 'transition' class which provides Christian pre-kindergarten daycare services.

== Notable alumni ==
- Tim Dormer – winner of Big Brother (Australian season 10)

== See also ==
- List of non-government schools in New South Wales
