= Dorothy Wall =

New Zealand writer

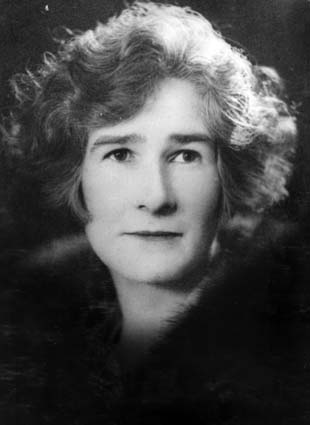
- Born: 12 January 1894; Kilbirnie, New Zealand
- Died: 21 January 1942 (aged 48); Cremorne, New South Wales, Australia
- Occupations: Author, illustrator
- Spouse(s): Andrew Delfosse Badgery (married 4 November 1921, St. Albans Anglican Church, Five Dock, New South Wales)
- Children: Peter (son)
- Writing career
- Period: 1920–1942
- Genre: Children's literature

Dorothy Wall (12 January 1894 – 21 January 1942) was a New Zealand-born writer and illustrator of children's fiction books. She is most famous for creating Blinky Bill, an anthropomorphic koala who was the central character in her books Blinky Bill: The Quaint Little Australian (1933), Blinky Bill Grows Up (1934) and Blinky Bill and Nutsy (1937). Most of her books were first published by Angus & Robertson.

== Biography ==
Wall was born in Kilbirnie, New Zealand on 12 January 1894 of English parents, Charles James William Wall and Lillian née Palethorpe. In 1904, at the age of ten, she won scholarships for her art. She migrated to Australia in 1914 and worked for The Sun newspaper in Sydney. In 1920 her first children's story "Tommy Bear and the Zookies" was published and the following year she married Andrew Delfosse Badgery. The same year Wall found some acclaim for her illustrations in J.J. Hall's book "The Crystal Bowl".

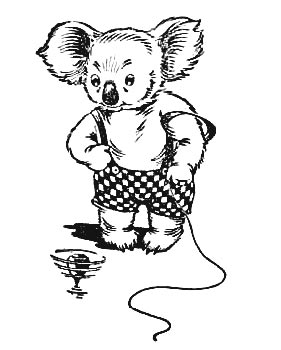
Wall's character "Blinky Bill" in The Quaint Little Australian (1933)

Throughout the 1920s and 1930s, she continued to work as an illustrator. Her best-known book Blinky Bill: The Quaint Little Australian was published in 1933. In 1934 she divorced Badgery and moved with her son to Warrimoo in the Blue Mountains where she completed two more Blinky Bill books, Blinky Bill Grows Up and Blinky Bill and Nutsy. Despite Blinky Bill's popularity Wall experienced financial difficulties and was forced to fall back on her skills as an artist. Angus & Robertson, Ltd., her publishers at the time, provided her with work illustrating book jackets.

Suffering from depression, Bipolar disorder and with failing health, Wall returned to New Zealand in 1937 where she became an illustrator for the New Zealand Herald and the Auckland Weekly News. Over the next few years, both her health and her financial situation improved, aided no doubt by the publishing of The Complete Adventures of Blinky Bill in 1939. In July 1941 Wall moved back to Sydney and the country she loved so much, but her health quickly deteriorated, and on 21 January 1942 she died of pneumonia at her home in Cremorne. She was buried in the Northern Suburbs cemetery.

== Legacy ==
In 1985 a postage stamp honouring Wall or her creation, Blinky Bill, was issued by Australia Post as part of a set of five commemorating children's books.

== Bibliography ==
- The Story of Tommy Bear and the Zookies (1920)
- The Rainy Day: Gift Book of the Commonwealth Savings Bank of Australia (1925)
- Blinky Bill: The Quaint Little Australian (1933)
- The Tale of Bridget and the Bees (1934)
- Blinky Bill Grows Up (1934)
- Brownie: The Story of a Naughty Little Rabbit (1935)
- Stout Fellows: Chum, Angelina Wallaby, Um-Pig and Flip (1936)
- Blinky Bill and Nutsy: Two Little Australians (1937)
- The Complete Adventures of Blinky Bill (1939)
- Blinky Bill Joins the Army (1940)
- Blinky Bill's Dress-Up Book (1942)
- Blinky Bill's ABC Book (1947)
- A Tiny Story of Blinky Bill (1947)
- Horrie Kiwi and the Kids (1983)
