= Electoral results for the Division of Cook (1906–1955) =

Australian division election results

This is a list of electoral results for the Division of Cook in Australian federal elections from the division's creation in 1906 until its abolition in 1955. For the later division of Cook, see Electoral results for the Division of Cook.

== Members ==
Member	Party	Term
James Catts	Labor	1906–1922
James Catts	Majority Labor	1922–1922
Edward Riley	Labor	1922–1934
Jock Garden	Labor (NSW)	1934–1936
Jock Garden	Labor	1936–1937
Tom Sheehan	Labor	1937–1940
Tom Sheehan	Labor (N-C)	1940–1941
Tom Sheehan	Labor	1941–1955
Jim Cope	Labor	1955–1955

== Election results ==
=== Elections in the 1950s ===
1955 Cook by-election
Party	Candidate	Votes	%	±%
Labor	Jim Cope	21,411	86.8	+3.4
Independent	John Somerville-Smith	3,248	13.2	+13.2
Total formal votes		24,659	96.8	
Informal votes		814	3.2	
Turnout		25,473	76.0	
Labor hold		Swing	−3.6	

==== 1954 ====
1954 Australian federal election: Cook
Party	Candidate	Votes	%	±%
Labor	Tom Sheehan	26,841	83.4	+5.3
Independent	Percy Staines	2,868	8.9	+8.9
Communist	Harry Hatfield	2,465	7.7	−0.7
Total formal votes		32,174	97.4	
Informal votes		851	2.6	
Turnout		33,025	94.9	
Two-party-preferred result
Labor	Tom Sheehan		90.4	+4.7
Independent	Percy Staines		9.6	+9.6
Labor hold		Swing	+4.7	

==== 1951 ====
1951 Australian federal election: Cook
Party	Candidate	Votes	%	±%
Labor	Tom Sheehan	27,637	78.1	+3.1
Liberal	Roy Hatfield	4,790	13.5	−2.8
Communist	Harry Hatfield	2,976	8.4	+4.9
Total formal votes		35,403	97.3	
Informal votes		965	2.7	
Turnout		36,368	94.4	
Two-party-preferred result
Labor	Tom Sheehan		85.7	+3.6
Liberal	Roy Hatfield		34.3	−3.6
Labor hold		Swing	+3.6	

=== Elections in the 1940s ===
==== 1949 ====
1949 Australian federal election: Cook
Party	Candidate	Votes	%	±%
Labor	Tom Sheehan	27,485	75.0	+2.7
Liberal	Gerald Davis	5,970	16.3	+3.9
Lang Labor	John Eldridge	1,920	5.2	−9.5
Communist	Mervyn Pidcock	1,276	3.5	−2.9
Total formal votes		36,651	96.9	
Informal votes		1,174	3.1	
Turnout		37,825	95.9	
Two-party-preferred result
Labor	Tom Sheehan		82.1	+8.7
Liberal	Gerald Davis		17.9	+17.9
Labor hold		Swing	+8.7	

==== 1946 ====
1946 Australian federal election: Cook
Party	Candidate	Votes	%	±%
Labor	Tom Sheehan	38,407	65.1	−3.8
Lang Labor	Arthur Brittain	8,423	14.3	+14.3
Liberal	Frank Preacher	7,306	12.4	+12.4
Communist	Lance Sharkey	4,341	7.4	+7.4
Independent	Frederick Fairbrother	559	0.9	+0.9
Total formal votes		59,036	96.0	
Informal votes		2,441	4.0	
Turnout		61,477	95.0	
Two-party-preferred result
Labor	Tom Sheehan		73.4	−3.0
Lang Labor	Arthur Brittain		26.6	+26.6
Labor hold		Swing	−3.0	

==== 1943 ====
1943 Australian federal election: Cook
Party	Candidate	Votes	%	±%
Labor	Tom Sheehan	39,653	68.9	+36.3
State Labor	Sid Conway	12,131	21.1	+21.1
One Parliament	Albert Jones	3,238	5.6	+5.6
Protestant Labour	Cyril Glassop	2,557	4.4	+4.4
Total formal votes		57,579	96.7	
Informal votes		1,986	3.3	
Turnout		59,565	98.0	
Two-party-preferred result
Labor	Tom Sheehan		76.4	+40.0
State Labor	Sid Conway		23.6	+23.6
Labor gain from Labor (N-C)		Swing	+40.0	

==== 1940 ====
1940 Australian federal election: Cook
Party	Candidate	Votes	%	±%
Labor (N-C)	Tom Sheehan	31,625	58.4	+58.4
Labor	Jock Garden	17,634	32.6	−37.7
Independent Labor	Cyril Glassop	4,901	9.0	+9.0
Total formal votes		54,160	96.4	
Informal votes		2,041	3.6	
Turnout		56,201	95.5	
Two-party-preferred result
Labor (N-C)	Tom Sheehan		63.6	+63.6
Labor	Jock Garden		36.4	−33.9
Labor (N-C) gain from Labor		Swing	+33.9	

=== Elections in the 1930s ===
==== 1937 ====
1937 Australian federal election: Cook
Party	Candidate	Votes	%	±%
Labor	Tom Sheehan	38,201	70.3	+45.2
Independent Labor	Cyril Glassop	16,125	29.7	+29.7
Total formal votes		56,642	95.9	
Informal votes		2,316	4.1	
Turnout		56,642	97.0	
Labor gain from Labor (NSW)		Swing	+78.6	

==== 1934 ====
1934 Australian federal election: Cook
Party	Candidate	Votes	%	±%
Labor (NSW)	Jock Garden	27,020	52.2	+3.0
Labor	Edward Riley	12,993	25.1	−1.8
United Australia	Francis Donnan	8,029	15.5	−7.7
Social Credit	Florence Cochrane	2,409	4.7	+4.7
Communist	Tom Wright	1,315	2.5	+2.5
Total formal votes		51,766	94.4	
Informal votes		3,092	5.6	
Turnout		54,858	96.1	
Two-party-preferred result
Labor (NSW)	Jock Garden		58.3	+6.3
Labor	Edward Riley		41.7	−6.3
Labor (NSW) hold		Swing	+6.3	

==== 1931 ====
1931 Australian federal election: Cook
Party	Candidate	Votes	%	±%
Labor (NSW)	Jock Garden	19,352	47.9	+47.9
Labor	Edward Riley	12,531	31.0	−53.2
United Australia	Charles Robinson	7,986	19.8	+4.0
Communist	Tom Wright	536	1.3	+1.3
Total formal votes		40,405	95.1	
Informal votes		2,063	4.9	
Turnout		42,468	96.4	
Two-party-preferred result
Labor	Edward Riley	20,560	50.9	−33.3
Labor (NSW)	Jock Garden	19,845	49.1	+49.1
Labor hold		Swing	−33.3	

=== Elections in the 1920s ===
==== 1929 ====
1929 Australian federal election: Cook
Party	Candidate	Votes	%	±%
Labor	Edward Riley	34,221	84.2	+8.7
Nationalist	William Pickup	6,409	15.8	−8.7
Total formal votes		40,630	97.0	
Informal votes		1,263	3.0	
Turnout		41,893	95.3	
Labor hold		Swing	+8.7	

==== 1928 ====
1928 Australian federal election: Cook
Party	Candidate	Votes	%	±%
Labor	Edward Riley	28,326	75.5	+7.7
Nationalist	Humphrey Earl	9,197	24.5	−7.7
Total formal votes		37,523	94.5	
Informal votes		2,202	5.5	
Turnout		39,725	95.1	
Labor hold		Swing	+7.7	

==== 1925 ====
1925 Australian federal election: Cook
Party	Candidate	Votes	%	±%
Labor	Edward Riley	25,764	67.8	+2.8
Nationalist	Arthur Philip	12,229	32.2	+11.1
Total formal votes		37,993	98.0	
Informal votes		764	2.0	
Turnout		38,757	92.2	
Labor hold		Swing	−6.9	

==== 1922 ====
1922 Australian federal election: Cook
Party	Candidate	Votes	%	±%
Labor	Edward Riley	14,644	65.0	+2.7
Nationalist	William Pritchard	4,749	21.1	−9.9
Majority Labor	James Catts	3,122	13.9	+13.9
Total formal votes		22,515	95.4	
Informal votes		1,085	4.6	
Turnout		23,600	57.6	
Two-party-preferred result
Labor	Edward Riley		74.9	+9.0
Nationalist	William Pritchard		25.1	−9.0
Labor hold		Swing	+9.0	

=== Elections in the 1910s ===
==== 1919 ====
1919 Australian federal election: Cook
Party	Candidate	Votes	%	±%
Labor	James Catts	14,559	62.3	−2.1
Nationalist	George Holt	7,248	31.0	−4.6
Ind. Socialist Labor	William McCristal	1,562	6.7	+6.7
Total formal votes		23,369	90.2	
Informal votes		2,540	9.8	
Turnout		25,909	66.1	
Two-party-preferred result
Labor	James Catts		65.7	+1.3
Nationalist	George Holt		34.3	−1.3
Labor hold		Swing	+1.3	

==== 1917 ====
1917 Australian federal election: Cook
Party	Candidate	Votes	%	±%
Labor	James Catts	18,101	64.4	+3.7
Nationalist	Richard Sleath	9,985	35.6	−1.8
Total formal votes		28,086	96.7	
Informal votes		950	3.3	
Turnout		29,036	70.7	
Labor hold		Swing	+2.7	

==== 1914 ====
1914 Australian federal election: Cook
Party	Candidate	Votes	%	±%
Labor	James Catts	16,568	60.7	+2.0
Liberal	Stanley Yarrington	10,197	37.4	−1.6
Socialist	Emily Paul	509	1.9	−0.3
Total formal votes		27,274	97.7	
Informal votes		629	2.3	
Turnout		27,903	60.6	
Labor hold		Swing	+1.8	

==== 1913 ====
1913 Australian federal election: Cook
Party	Candidate	Votes	%	±%
Labor	James Catts	17,271	58.7	−2.3
Liberal	David Doull	11,473	39.0	+0.0
Socialist	Tom Walsh	661	2.2	+2.2
Total formal votes		29,405	96.9	
Informal votes		942	3.1	
Turnout		30,347	71.2	
Labor hold		Swing	−1.1	

==== 1910 ====
1910 Australian federal election: Cook
Party	Candidate	Votes	%	±%
Labour	James Catts	14,021	64.1	+11.1
Liberal	William Clegg	7,856	35.9	−11.1
Total formal votes		21,877	98.6	
Informal votes		319	1.4	
Turnout		22,196	65.7	
Labour hold		Swing	+11.1	

=== Elections in the 1900s ===
==== 1906 ====
1906 Australian federal election: Cook
Party	Candidate	Votes	%	±%
Labour	James Catts	8,563	53.0	
Anti-Socialist	John Hindle	7,591	47.0	
Total formal votes		16,154	97.2	
Informal votes		470	2.8	
Turnout		14,725	52.5	
Labour notional hold		Swing		
