= 2YYY =

- Australia
- Broadcast area: Young, New South Wales, Australia
- Frequency: 92.3 MHz FM
- Branding: 2YYY – Position 92.3

Ownership
- Owner: Lambing Flat Community Broadcasting Inc; Young District Arts Council Inc

History
- First air date: September 2004
- Call sign meaning: 2 = NSW Young Young Young

Technical information
- Class: Community

Links
- Website: 2YYY Radio; Young FM – Position 92.3

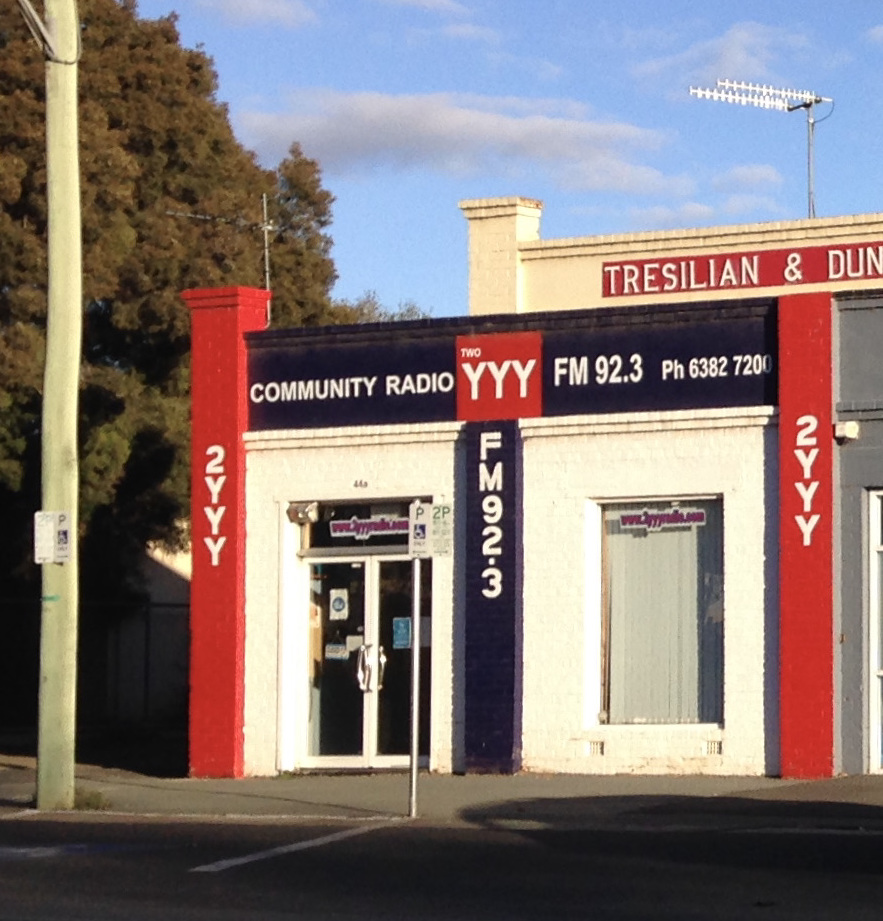
2YYY Community Radio FM92.3

2YYY is a community radio station which broadcasts on 92.3 MHz FM in Young, New South Wales. The station holds a long term community radio broadcasting licence and began broadcasting in September 2004.

== History ==
2YYY was formed by a group of local people in Young which was headed by the former General Manager of 2LF and 93.9 Star FM, Graham McDonald. The station's office and studios were originally located in the old TAB building in Cloete Street and the transmitter is located on Reservoir Hill, on the Cowra Road.

In 2007, 2YYY applied to Australian Communications and Media Authority (ACMA) for a permanent community radio licence which ACMA did not allocate to the station on grounds that 2YYY provided "insufficient evidence that the proposed service would meet the existing and perceived future needs of the community". ACMA also found that 2YYY failed to encourage community participation and exceeded ACMA limits on broadcasting sponsorship announcements.

In 2008, Young and District Arts Council applied to ACMA for a community broadcasting license, whereupon ACMA tried to find agreement for bandwidth sharing with both 2YYY and the Arts Council, as they had failed to negotiate a mutually agreed time share arrangement. A proposed sharing arrangement by ACMA would see 2YYY broadcast for six months and the Arts Council acquiring the license for six months from 4 January.

27 June 2008, ACMA announced that Young District Arts Council Inc was issued a temporary community radio broadcasting licence and also announced that Lambing Flat Community Broadcasting Inc (LFCB) and Young District Arts Council Inc (YDAC) would be time sharing the 92.3 MHz frequency. LFCB would broadcast from 1 July 2008 until 3 January 2009 and YDAC to broadcast from 4 January 2009 until 30 June 2009. In July 2008 2YYY, under the management of a fully constituted Board of Management, moved to its present location at 44a Lovell St., Young (former T & D building). The station has since gone from strength to strength, and in early 2013, the ACMA offered 2YYY a long term licence; which was allocated to LFCBInc/2YYY in late September 2013. 2YYY continues to provide news, weather, and a wide variety of music to its listeners. All activities at 2YYY are performed by volunteer presenters; guided by a 7-person Board of Management. In August 2018 2YYY was granted renewal of a long term (5 years) broadcasting licence. 2YYY is run by a competent 7-member Board of Management and has 35 volunteers.
