= Dorothy M. Catts =

Australian writer, editor and businesswoman (1896–1961)

- Born: Dorothy Marguerite Purcell; 1 March 1896 Beecroft, New South Wales, Australia
- Died: 10 March 1961 (aged 65) Young, New South Wales, Australia

Dorothy Marguerite Catts (1877–1961) was an Australian writer and businesswoman. She was co-editor of two periodicals, Australian Home Budget and Countrywoman in New South Wales.

== Life ==
Catts was the daughter of Frances Eliza (née Lepherd) and builder, Peter Purcell. She was born on 1 March 1896 at Beecroft, New South Wales.

She married James Howard Catts at St. Stephen's Presbyterian Church in Sydney on 8 September 1920. James was then Member for Cook in the Federal Parliament but lost his seat in 1922. The couple made their home at Huntleys Point.

In December 1922, she and her husband founded a printing company and published Australian Home Budget. She edited the magazine for 25 years, which included free paper patterns for dressmaking.

Catts died at Young, New South Wales on 10 March 1961. Her husband predeceased her in 1951.

Catts Place, in the Canberra suburb of Gilmore, is named in her honour.

== Works ==
=== Biographies ===
- Catts, Dorothy M. (1953). James Howard Catts, M.H.R. Ure Smith.
- ——— (1957). King O'Malley, man and statesman : with an introd. by Dame Mary Gilmore. Publicity Press.

=== Novels ===
- Catts, Dorothy M. (1946). Dawn to destiny. Consolidated Press.
- ——— (1947). Cornerstone. Shakespeare Head.
- ——— (1955). Those golden years. Hutchinson.
- ——— (1957). The Crathies of Killars. Hurst & Blackett.
