= Young, New South Wales =

Young
- Town
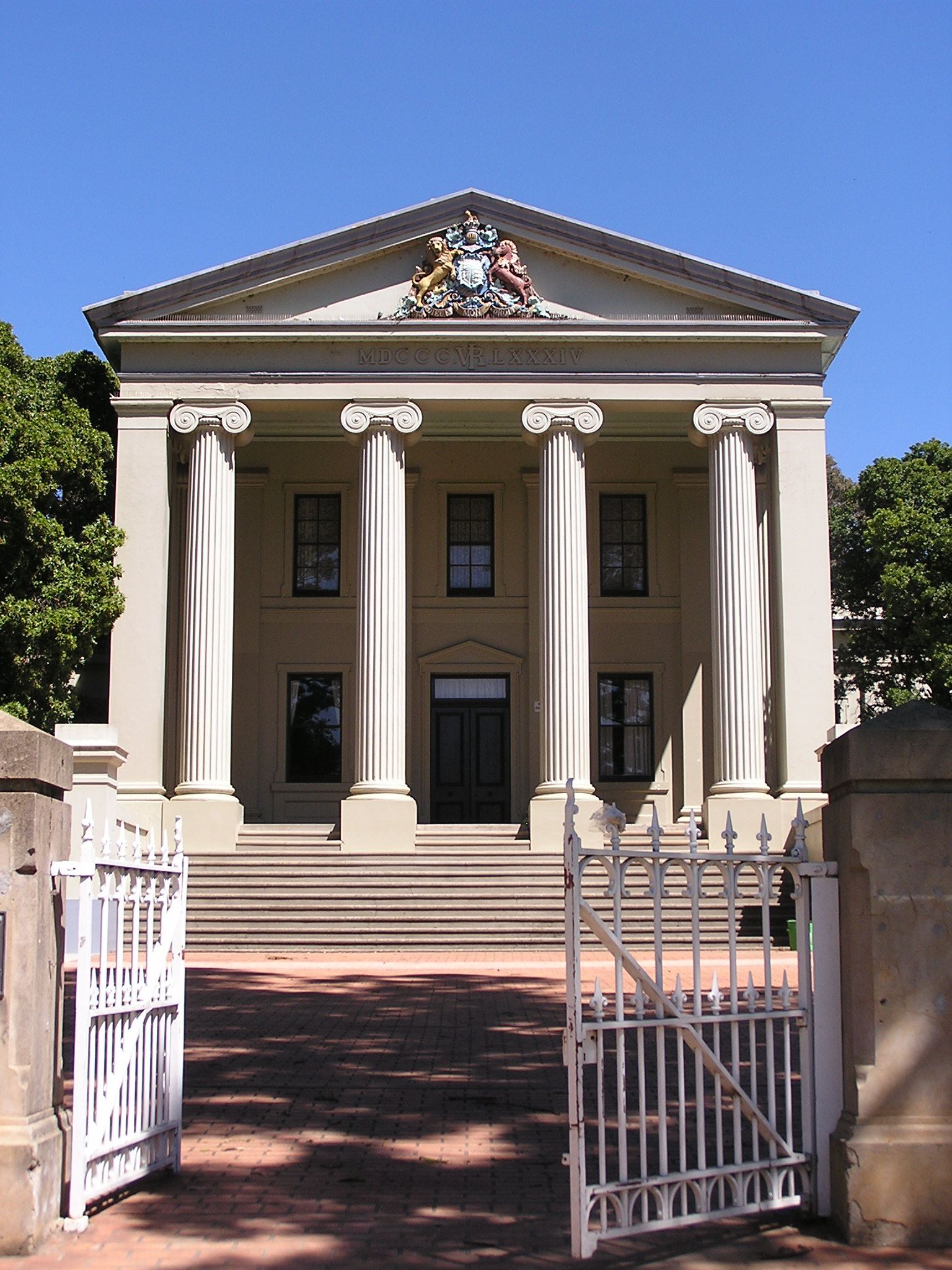
- Young courthouse built in 1884 but transferred to the Department of Education in 1925 and used as the main hall of Young High School

- Coordinates: 34°18′0″S 148°18′0″E
- Country: Australia
- State: New South Wales
- LGA: Hilltops Council
- Location: 372 km (231 mi) WSW of Sydney; 133 km (83 mi) NW of Canberra; 49 km (30 mi) NE of Cootamundra; 71 km (44 mi) SW of Cowra; 96 km (60 mi) NW of Yass
- Established: 1826

Government
  - State electorate: Cootamundra
  - Federal division: Riverina
- Elevation: 440 m (1,440 ft)

Population
  - Total: 10,610 (2021)
- Postcode: 2594
- County: Monteagle
- Mean max temp: 22.2 °C (72.0 °F)
- Mean min temp: 7.1 °C (44.8 °F)
- Annual rainfall: 626.2 mm (24.65 in)

Young is a town in the South Western Slopes region of New South Wales, Australia, and the largest town in the Hilltops Region. The "Lambing Flat" Post Office opened on 1 March 1861 and was renamed "Young" in 1863.

Young is marketed as the Cherry Capital of Australia and every year hosts the National Cherry Festival. Young is situated on the Olympic Highway and is approximately two hours' drive from the Canberra area. It is in a valley, with surrounding hills. The town is named after Sir John Young, the governor of NSW from 1861 to 1867.

== History ==
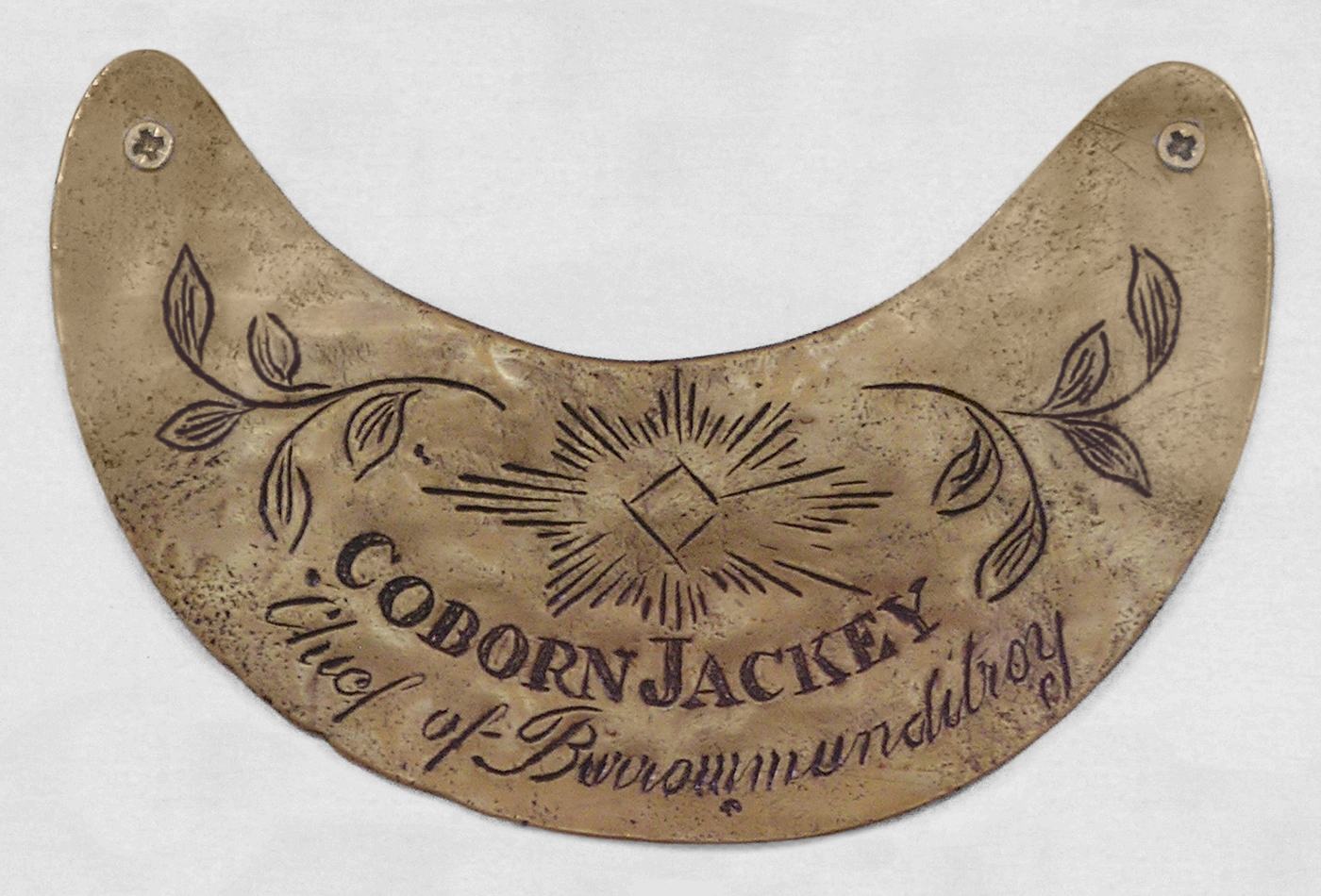
Brass breast plate presented to the Aboriginal leader Coborn Jackey of the Burrowmunditory tribe by the squatter James White. The artifact is held in the museum at Young.

Before European settlers arrived in Young, members of the Burrowmunditory tribe, a family group of the indigenous Wiradjuri Nation, lived in the region. Descendants of the Burrowmunditory clan still live in Young.

James White was the first European settler in the district and established 'Burrangong' station in 1826 with a squatting claim of 260 square kilometres (100 sq mi). His story is told in the novel Brothers in Exile.

In late June 1860 Michael Sheedy from Binalong, and a group of other stockmen, were on James White's 'Burrangong' pastoral run looking for horses. The sheltered area known as 'Lambing Flat' lay along a creek between heavily timbered hills. Stock yards had been built there and used to enclose strayed and wild horses from the surrounding country. The cook for the party, an American, "who was familiar with the appearance of many other goldfields, was struck with the appearance of the place". The cook washed several spadefuls of earth "and succeeded in getting a good prospect of gold". After procuring the horses the men returned to Binalong, 32 miles to the south-east, and after a few days Sheedy and six men returned with tools and provisions, "determined to test the auriferous quality of the place". The second dishful washed by the men produced a nugget of seven pennyweight. By late July 1860 word had spread and there were about fifty persons at Lambing Flat who had joined the search for gold.

=== Lambing Flat riots ===
From November 1860 through to June 1861, anti-Chinese miners attacked Chinese gold miners in the area, now known as the infamous Lambing Flat riots. As gold became scarce, European miners began to resent what they saw as the greater success of the more industrious Chinese, and hence many Chinese miners were attacked, robbed and killed. The anti-Chinese rebels rallied in numbers of up to 3,000. Eventually the rioters were controlled and Chinese miners had their claims restored to them, but the New South Wales Parliament passed the Chinese Immigration Bill which restricted the number of Chinese that could be brought into New South Wales on any ship and imposed a tax per head on entry.

The town of Young was gazetted in 1861. The goldfields produced 15,000 kilograms (470,000 ozt) of gold sent by escort from the fields. Up to 20,000 miners worked the fields including about 2,000 Chinese miners.

Later in the 1860s, some Chinese who remained in the district ran intensive and successful market gardens, supplying Young and other towns, even as far away as Wagga Wagga.

The town was incorporated in 1882, with miller Peter Cram the first mayor.

In 1889 Young was the first town in Australia to install electricity into the streets and homes of the township; Tamworth NSW had installed electricity to the streets only the previous year.

The former Young Shire was acknowledged as the first Local Government Area to institute a rural school bus system in New South Wales.

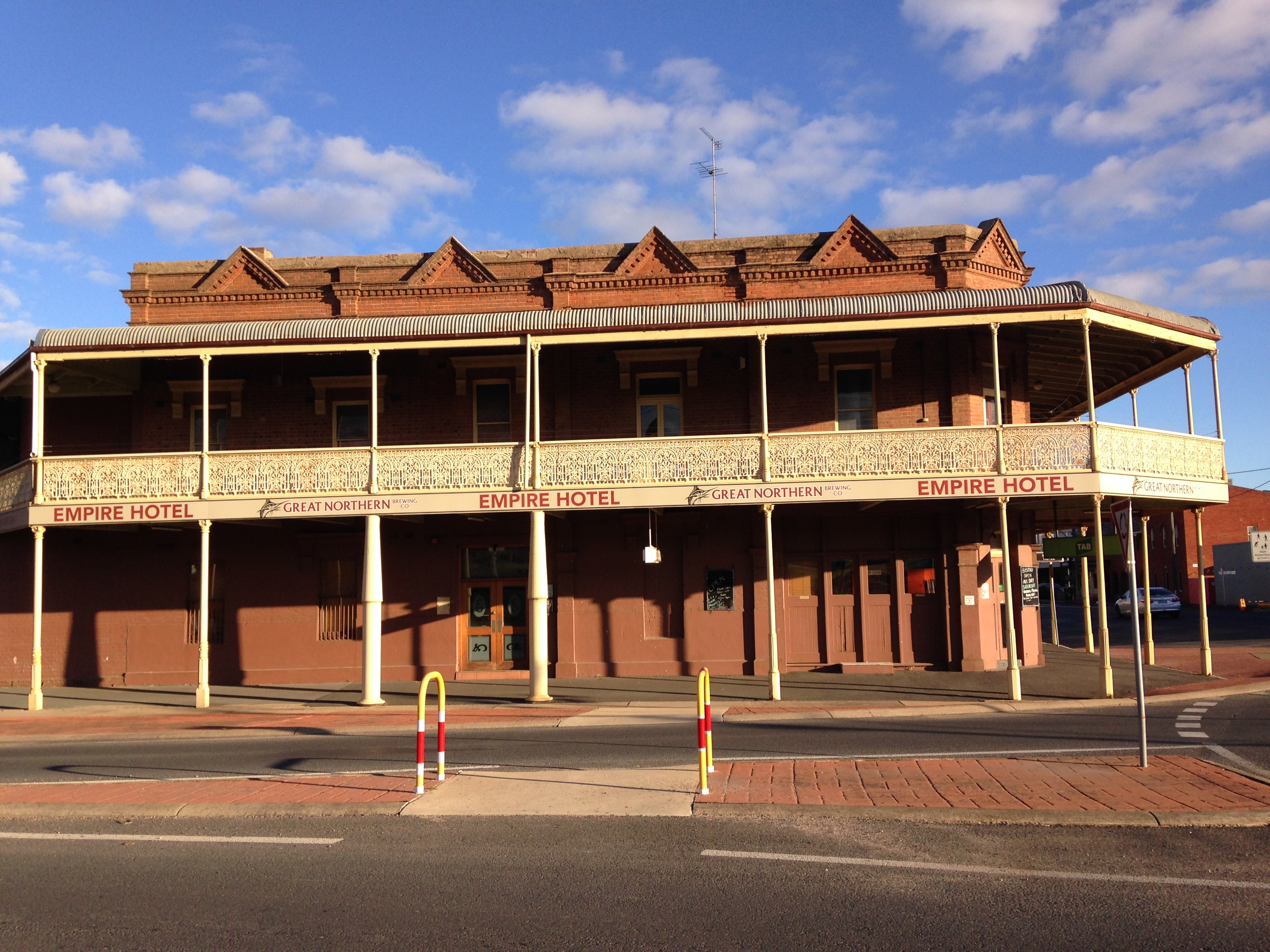
Empire Hotel (June 2021)

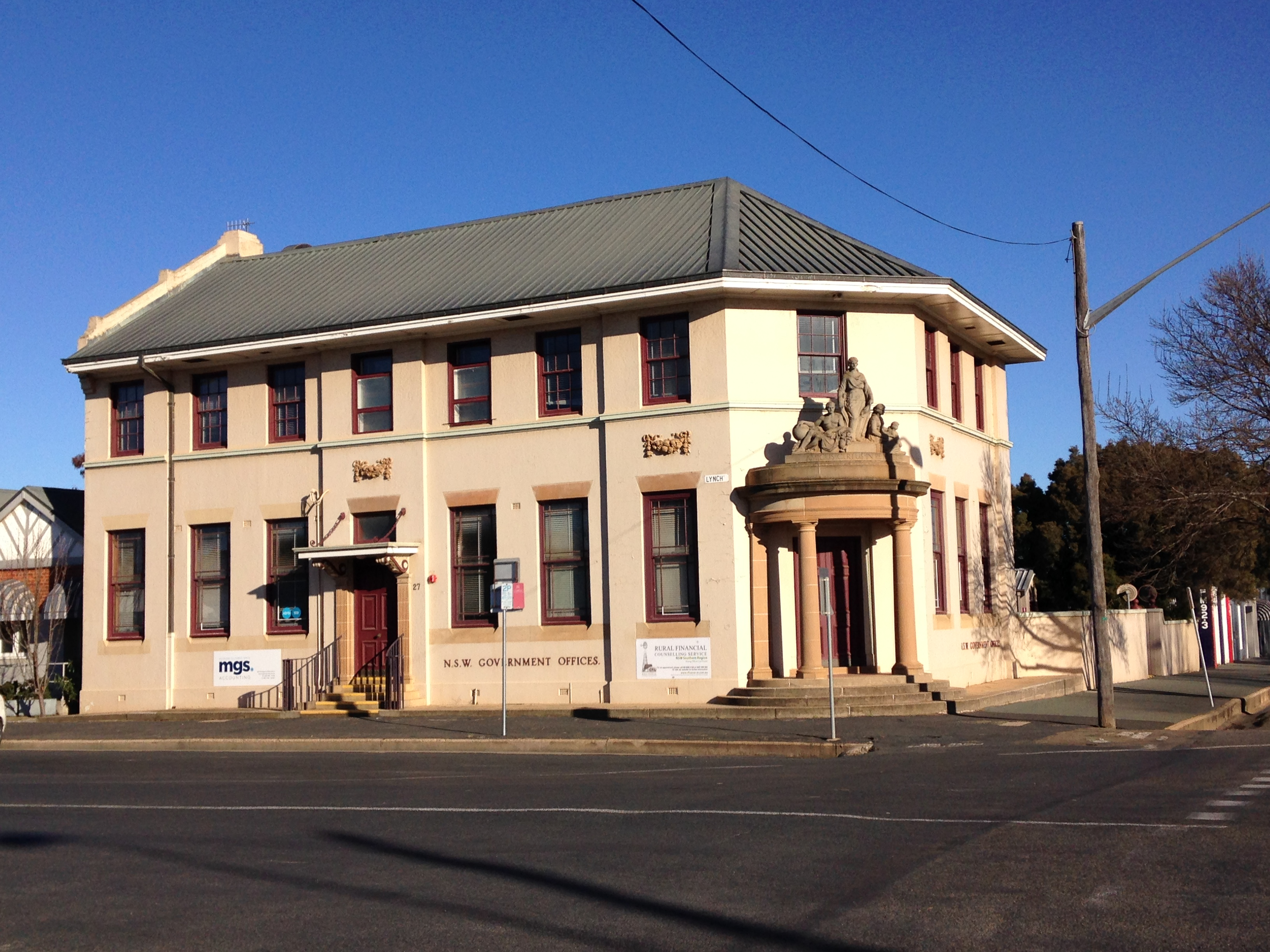
NSW Government Offices

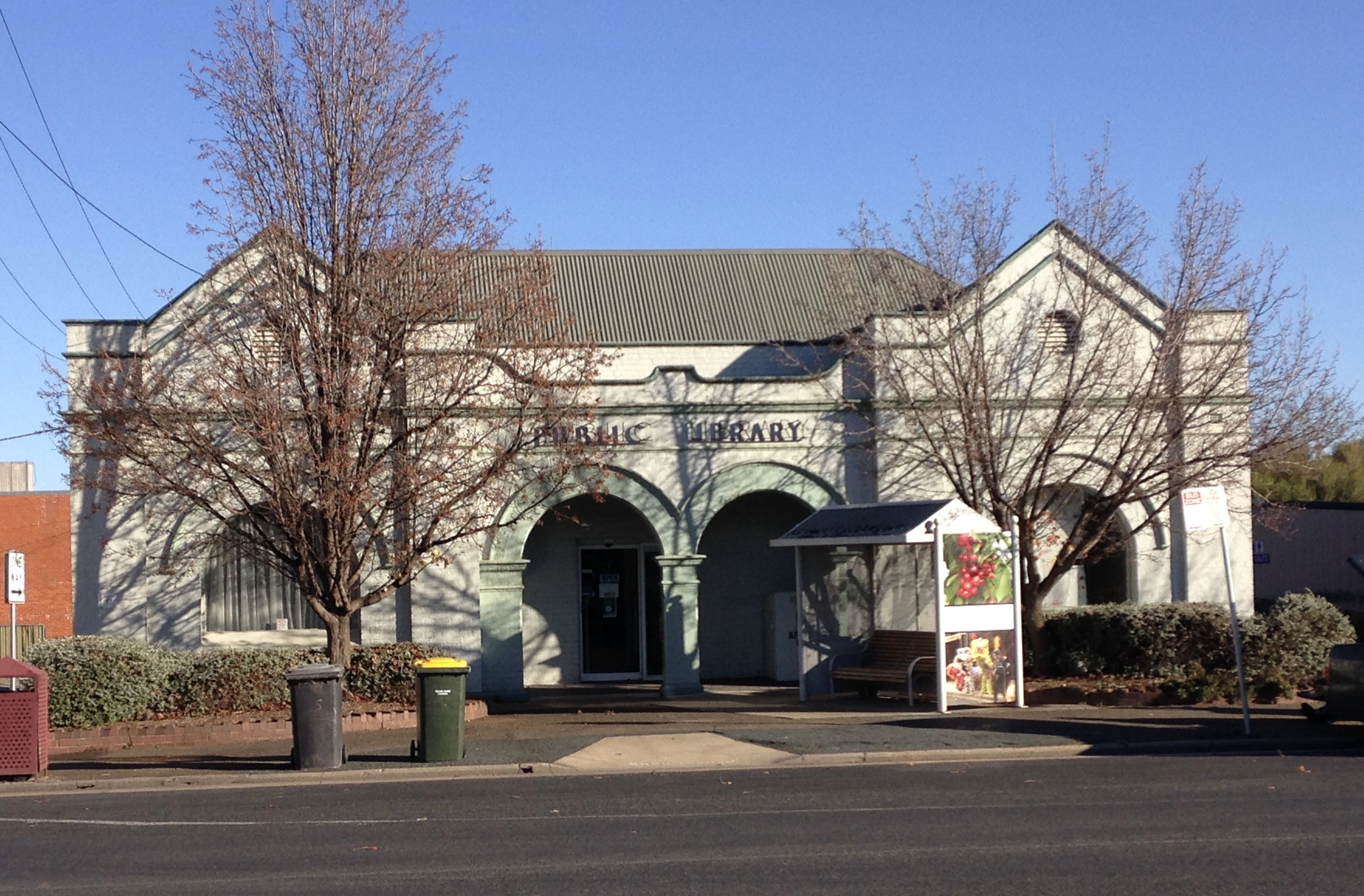
Public library (2021)

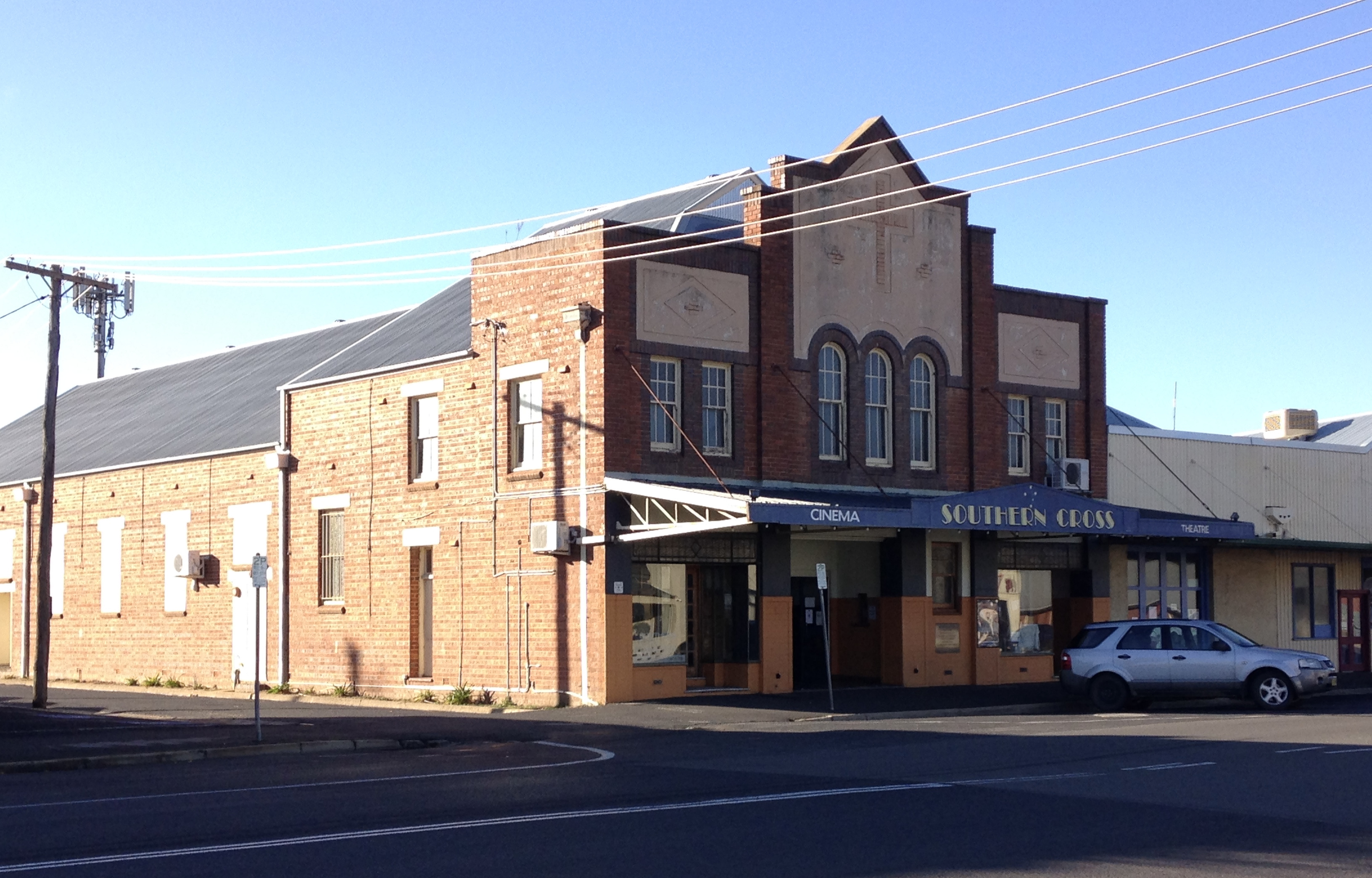
Southern Cross Cinema (community-run)

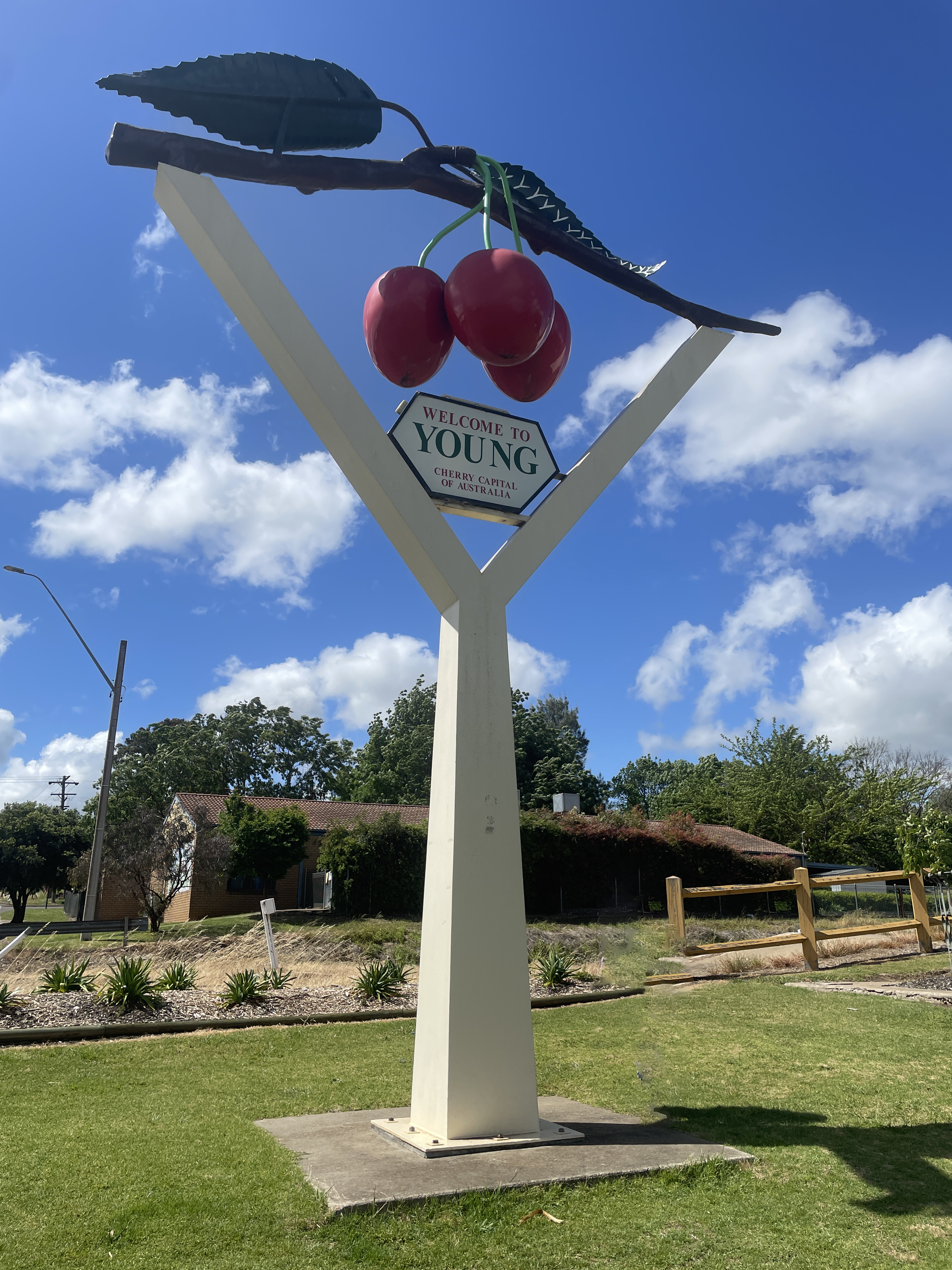
Pioneer cherry grower monument (2023)

== Heritage listings ==
Young has a number of heritage-listed sites, including:

- Blayney–Harden railway: Young railway station
- Lynch Street: City Bank building
- Whiteman Avenue: Blackguard Gully

== Climate ==
The area features hot, dry summers and cool, damp winters making for a great seasonal range characteristic of the South West Slopes region. Despite its low elevation, it lies sufficiently west for exposure to cold Southern Ocean airmasses that occasionally bring snow.

Climate data are sourced from Young Airport, at an elevation of 380 metres (1,250 ft) and operating since 1988.

Climate data for Young Airport (1988–2022); 380 m AMSL; 34.25° S, 148.25° E
Month	Jan	Feb	Mar	Apr	May	Jun	Jul	Aug	Sep	Oct	Nov	Dec	Year
Record high °C (°F)	44.9 (112.8)	43.6 (110.5)	38.6 (101.5)	33.9 (93.0)	27.1 (80.8)	21.9 (71.4)	20.1 (68.2)	23.6 (74.5)	30.8 (87.4)	35.0 (95.0)	42.1 (107.8)	44.1 (111.4)	44.9 (112.8)
Mean daily maximum °C (°F)	32.0 (89.6)	30.4 (86.7)	27.2 (81.0)	22.8 (73.0)	17.7 (63.9)	13.9 (57.0)	13.0 (55.4)	14.5 (58.1)	18.0 (64.4)	22.1 (71.8)	26.0 (78.8)	29.3 (84.7)	22.2 (72.0)
Mean daily minimum °C (°F)	14.9 (58.8)	14.5 (58.1)	11.4 (52.5)	6.8 (44.2)	3.4 (38.1)	2.3 (36.1)	1.0 (33.8)	1.3 (34.3)	3.0 (37.4)	5.6 (42.1)	9.5 (49.1)	12.0 (53.6)	7.1 (44.8)
Record low °C (°F)	1.4 (34.5)	2.3 (36.1)	0.4 (32.7)	−4.1 (24.6)	−5.8 (21.6)	−6.1 (21.0)	−7.0 (19.4)	−6.5 (20.3)	−5.5 (22.1)	−4.7 (23.5)	−2.5 (27.5)	−0.2 (31.6)	−7.0 (19.4)
Average precipitation mm (inches)	45.6 (1.80)	51.1 (2.01)	49.7 (1.96)	33.4 (1.31)	42.2 (1.66)	61.1 (2.41)	58.8 (2.31)	52.7 (2.07)	51.8 (2.04)	50.0 (1.97)	71.2 (2.80)	55.0 (2.17)	626.2 (24.65)
Average precipitation days (≥ 0.2 mm)	7.5	6.9	7.0	5.6	10.4	15.1	17.8	15.6	11.3	9.5	9.2	7.0	122.9
Average afternoon relative humidity (%)	31	34	35	40	51	63	63	55	51	44	38	31	45
Source: Australian Bureau of Meteorology

== Demographics ==
Historical population
Year	Pop.	±%
1921	3,283	—
1933	4,011	+22.2%
1947	4,656	+16.1%
1954	5,503	+18.2%
1961	5,448	−1.0%
1966	5,754	+5.6%
1971	6,064	+5.4%
1976	6,459	+6.5%
1981	6,906	+6.9%
1986	6,797	−1.6%
1991	6,666	−1.9%
1996	6,798	+2.0%
2001	6,821	+0.3%
2006	7,141	+4.7%
2011	6,960	−2.5%
2016	7,170	+3.0%
2021	7,712	+7.6%
Source: Australian Bureau of Statistics data.

At the 2021 census, the population of Young was 10,610, up from 10,295 people at the 2016 census.

The breakdown of population in 2016 in the township included 367 people (5.1%) (197 males and 172 females) who identified as being of Indigenous origin. The median age of people was 40 years.

The number of people born overseas in the 2016 census was 1023 (13.9%) compared with 650 (5.8%) in the 2001 census, 589 (5.3%) in the 1996 census and 549 (5.1%) in the 1991 census. Of those born overseas, the three main countries of birth in the 2016 census were:

- England: 95 (1.3%)
- New Zealand: 47 (0.7%) and;
- Lebanon: 37 (0.5%).

In the 2016 census, the three most common ancestries identified with were:

- Australian: 3405 people (35.8%)
- English: 2957 people (31.1%) and;
- Irish: 1045 people (11.0%).

English was stated as the only language spoken at home by 6,413 people (89.6%) in the 2016 census. The three most common languages spoken at home other than English in the 2016 census were:

- Arabic (including Lebanese): 88 (1.2%)
- Tagalog: 22 (0.3%) and;
- Mandarin: 22 (0.3%).

In the week preceding the 2016 census, 1894 households (67.8%) had accessed the internet at home. 501 (8.9%) people held a bachelor's degree or above. 212 people were unemployed, representing 7.6% of the labour force. The median weekly individual income for people aged 15 years and over in the 2016 census was $505. In the 2016 census, there were 2,324 separate houses (83.2%), 202 semi-detached, row or terrace houses and townhouses (7.2%), 257 flats, units or apartments (9.2%) and 3 other dwellings (0.1%). In the 2016 census, there were 594 couple families with children (which comprised 34.4% of all families in occupied private dwellings), 675 couple families without children (39.1%), 431 one parent families (24.9%) and 28 other families (1.6%).

At the 2011 census, Young had a population of 6,960.

== The Lambing Flat Chinese Tribute Gardens ==
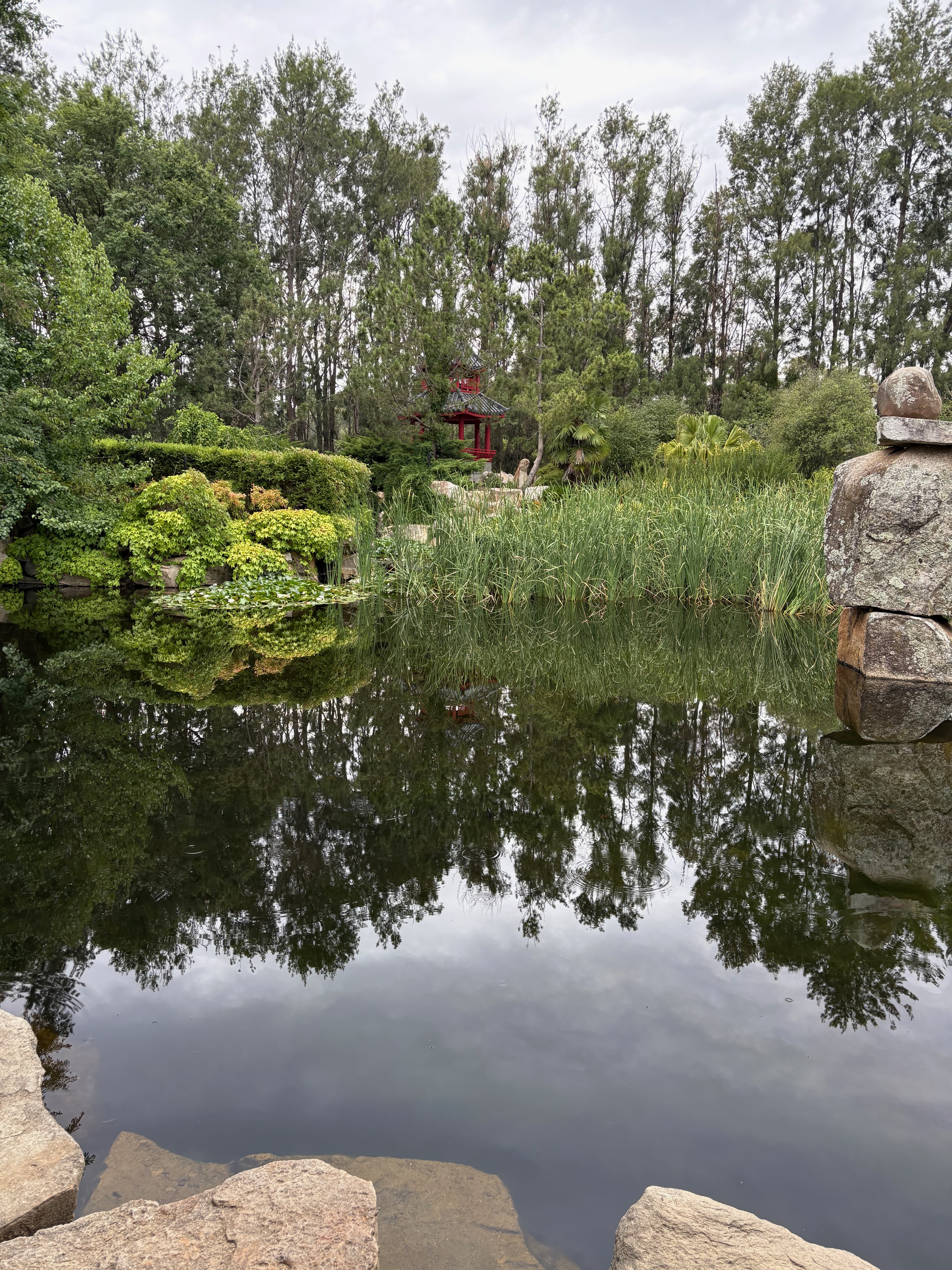
The Lambing Flat Chinese Tribute Gardens

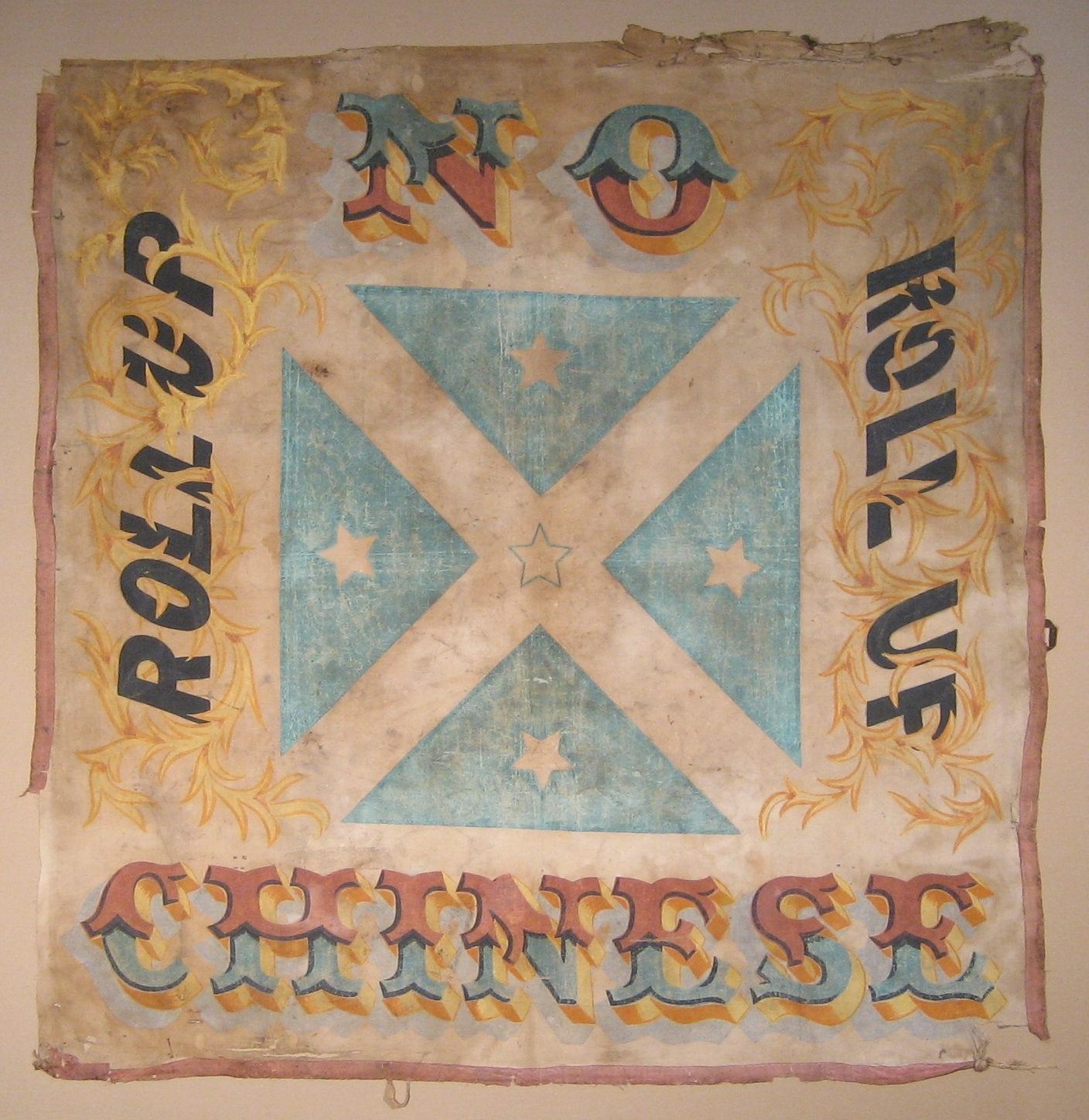
The Roll Up banner around which a mob of about 1,000 men rallied and attacked Chinese miners at Lambing Flat in June 1861. The banner is now on display in the museum at Young.

Young Shire Council established the Lambing Flat Chinese Tribute Gardens adjacent to the site of Chinamans Dam, an old railway dam approximately 4 kilometres (2.5 mi) south of Young. The gardens are intended to create an ambience similar to the Japanese Gardens at Cowra. Chinamans Dam, with an initial capacity of over 9,100 cubic metres (2×10^{6} imp gal) when it was in railway use, is situated at a hamlet called Pitstone on Sawpit Gully. The dam was built in the 1860s by German brothers (from Hannover), Herman and John Tiedemann, to provide water for the sluicing of their Victoria Hill gold claims. At some time in the 1870s, the brothers sold the area, including the dam, to a Chinese group who worked the site.

The dam was used as a railway facility from 1882 when the NSW Railway Commissioners gave notice of the intention to build the first part of the Blayney-Demondrille railway. To provide water for its steam locomotives, the Commissioners decided to provide a dam and pump water from it to a facility, known as Young Tank, at the 396-kilometre (246 mi) post. It is not known whether the railways enhanced the existing dam or built a new facility.

From 1885 to 1901, locomotives stopped at Young Tank to replenish their water. In 1901, watering facilities were built at Young Station. The supply of water was obtained from Chinamans Dam. The capacity of the dam was enlarged in 1911. The dam was a popular spot for swimming and, whilst officially frowned upon, was tolerated.

Following the connection to the South West Tablelands Water Supply Scheme, which provided water from Burrinjuck Dam, the railways ceased to draw water from Chinamans Dam after 1936. The site was returned to the Crown in 1962 and in the following year, a 15-hectare (36-acre) reserve was established and the Shire Council were appointed as trustees. The dam has since been enlarged.

== Agriculture and tourism ==
Cherry growing at Young dates to 1847, with the first commercial orchard planted in 1878. The mid season cherry variety Ron's Seedling originated at Young in about 1928 from a hand pollinated cross by S. A. Thornell.

Young hosts the National Cherry Festival, held in early December, and the surrounding Hilltops district includes pick your own orchards and orchard gate cherry sales during the summer cherry season.

== Education ==
Young has six schools:

- St Mary's Primary School
- New Madinah College
- Young North Primary School
- Young Public School
- Hennessy Catholic College
- Young High School

== Sport ==
Rugby football is traditionally popular in Young, with a strong Maher Cup rugby league team competing between 1920 and 1971.

The following sports teams operate out of Young:

- Young Cherrypickers are a rugby league team playing in the Group 9 competition
- Burrangong Bears are a rugby league team playing in the George Tooke Shield competition
- Young Yabbies is a rugby union team playing in the Southern Inland Rugby Union competition.
- Young Lions is a soccer club fielding teams that play in the Bathurst District Soccer Senior Men's and Senior Women's competition.

Australian rules football was also at times popular in Young, with the Young Saints experiencing success in the Central West AFL in the 1980s, however despite attempts to revive it as a junior club, folded in 2018.

Young Golf Club is a public golf course in the town. Golf NSW describes it as a tree-lined, fully irrigated 5,618-metre course designed by Carnegie Clark.

== Media ==
=== Newspapers ===
- Burrangong Argus 1864–1914 (incorporated in The Young Witness)
- Burrangong Chronicle 1873–1902 (became the Young Chronicle)
- Burrangong Courier 1962 (ceased publication)
- The Lambing Flat Miner 1862–1961 (ceased publication)
- Young Chronicle 1902–1947 (incorporated in The Young Witness)
- The Young Witness 1909–

=== Radio stations ===
- ABC Classic 88.3
- ABC Radio National 89.1/97.1
- ABC Riverina 89.9/96.3
- Roccy FM 93.9 (commercial)
- SBS Radio FM 98.7 (retransmission)
- triple j 90.7
- 2LF AM 1350 (commercial)
- 2YYY (community radio)
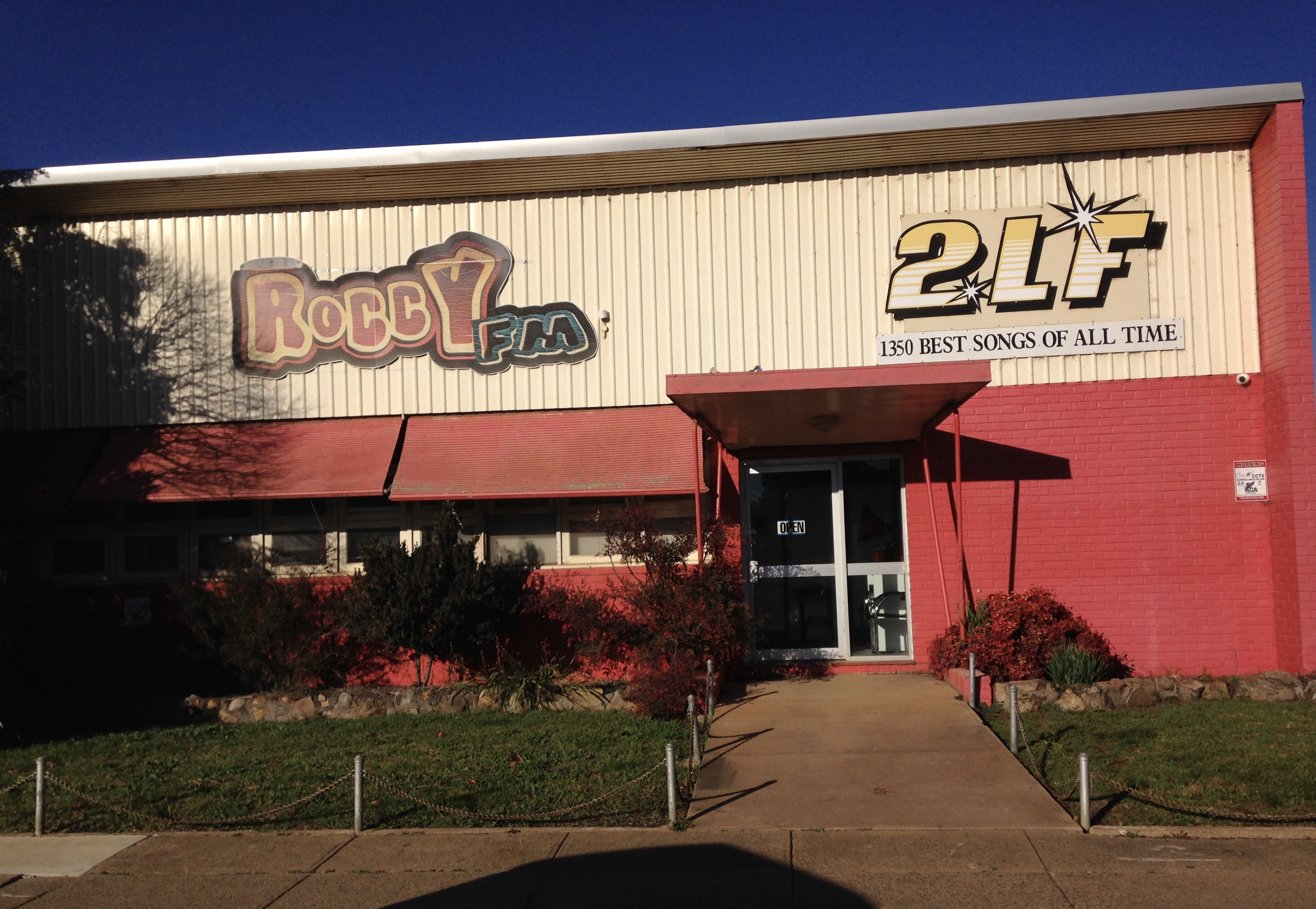
Roccy FM and 2LF

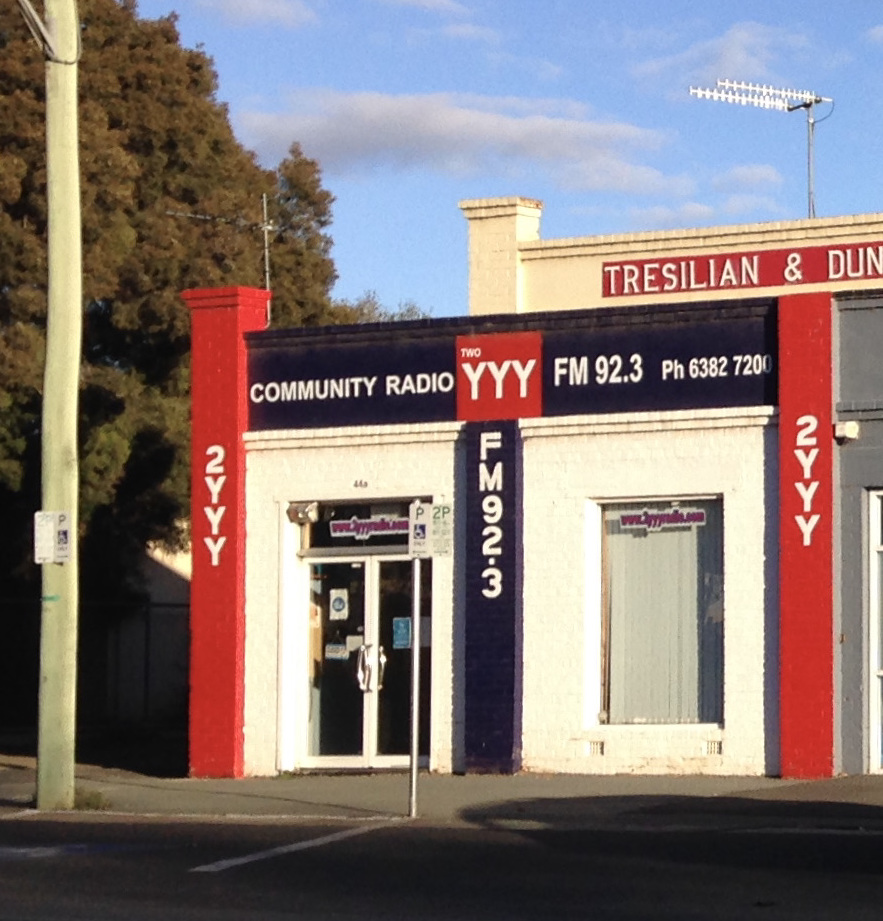
2YYY Community Radio FM92.3

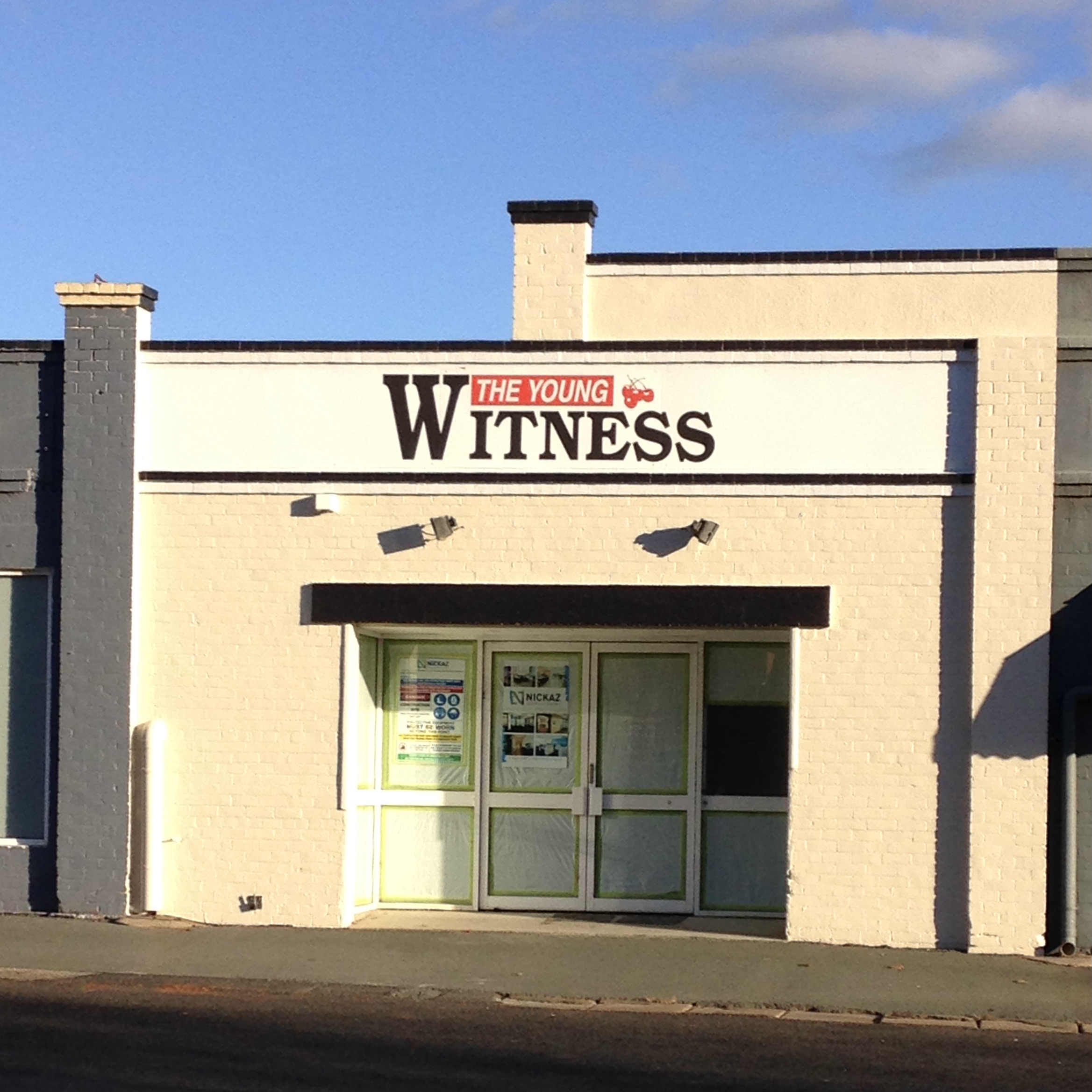
The Young Witness

== Churches ==
- Kingdom Hall of Jehovah's Witnesses, Wombat Street
- New Life Community Church – McDonnels Road
- St John's Anglican Church – cnr Cloete and Zouch Streets
- St Mary's Roman Catholic Church – Ripon Street
- St Paul's Presbyterian Church – cnr Lynch and Lovell Streets
- Young Baptist Church – Nasmyth Street
- Young Mosque (Lebanese Muslim Association) – Moppity Road
- Young Seventh-Day Adventist Church – Wombat Street
- Young Uniting Church – cnr Lynch and Cloete Streets
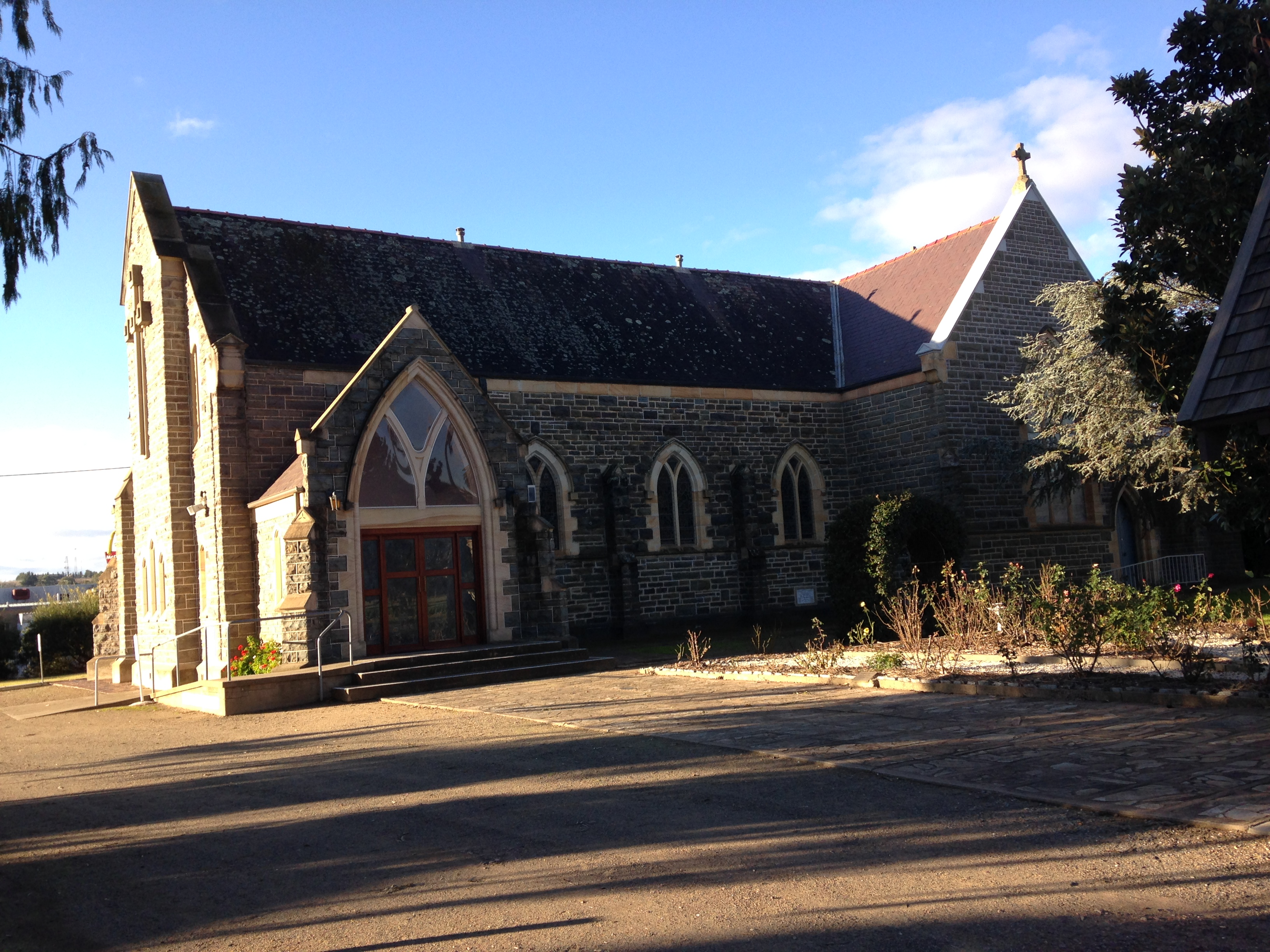
St John's

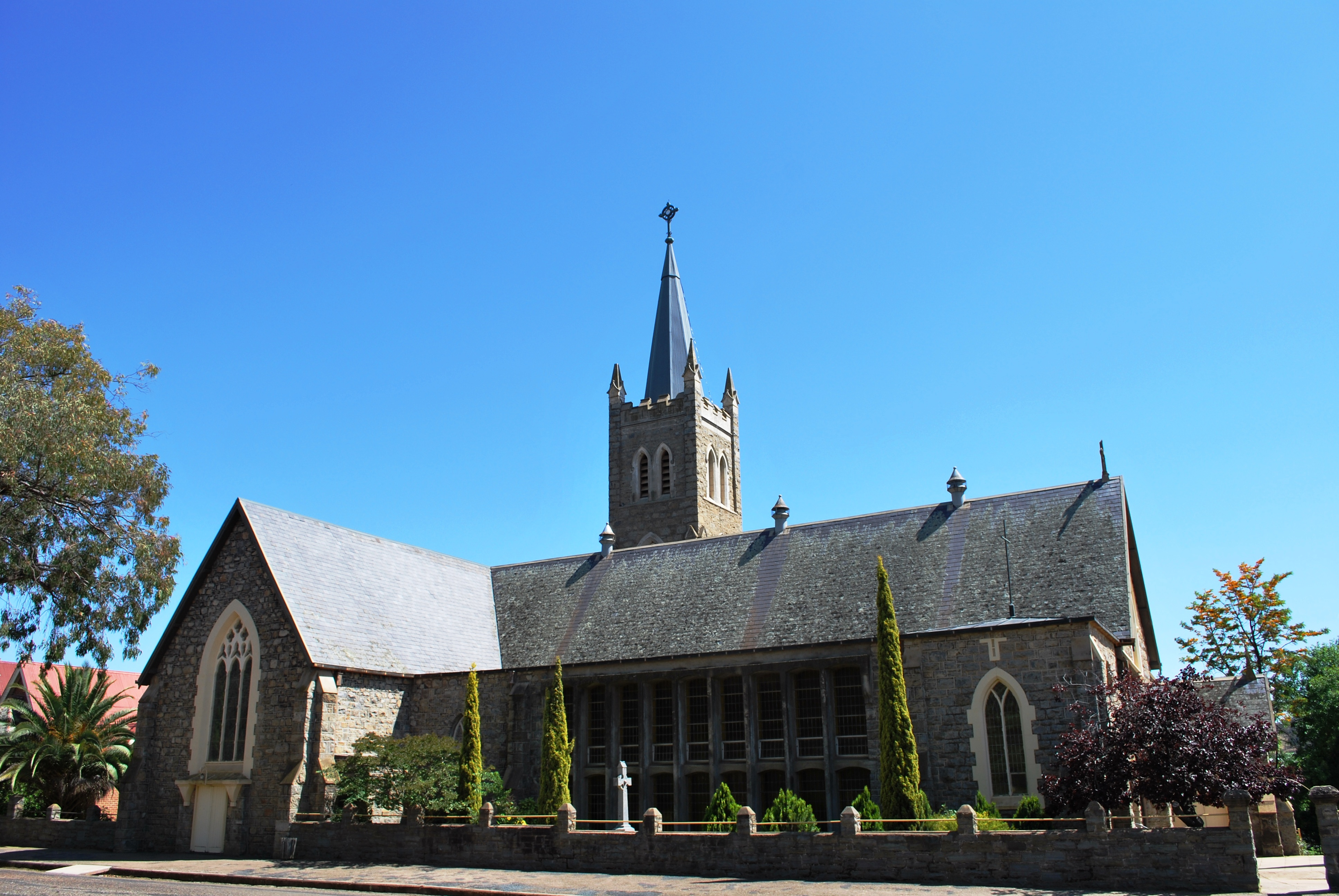
St Mary's

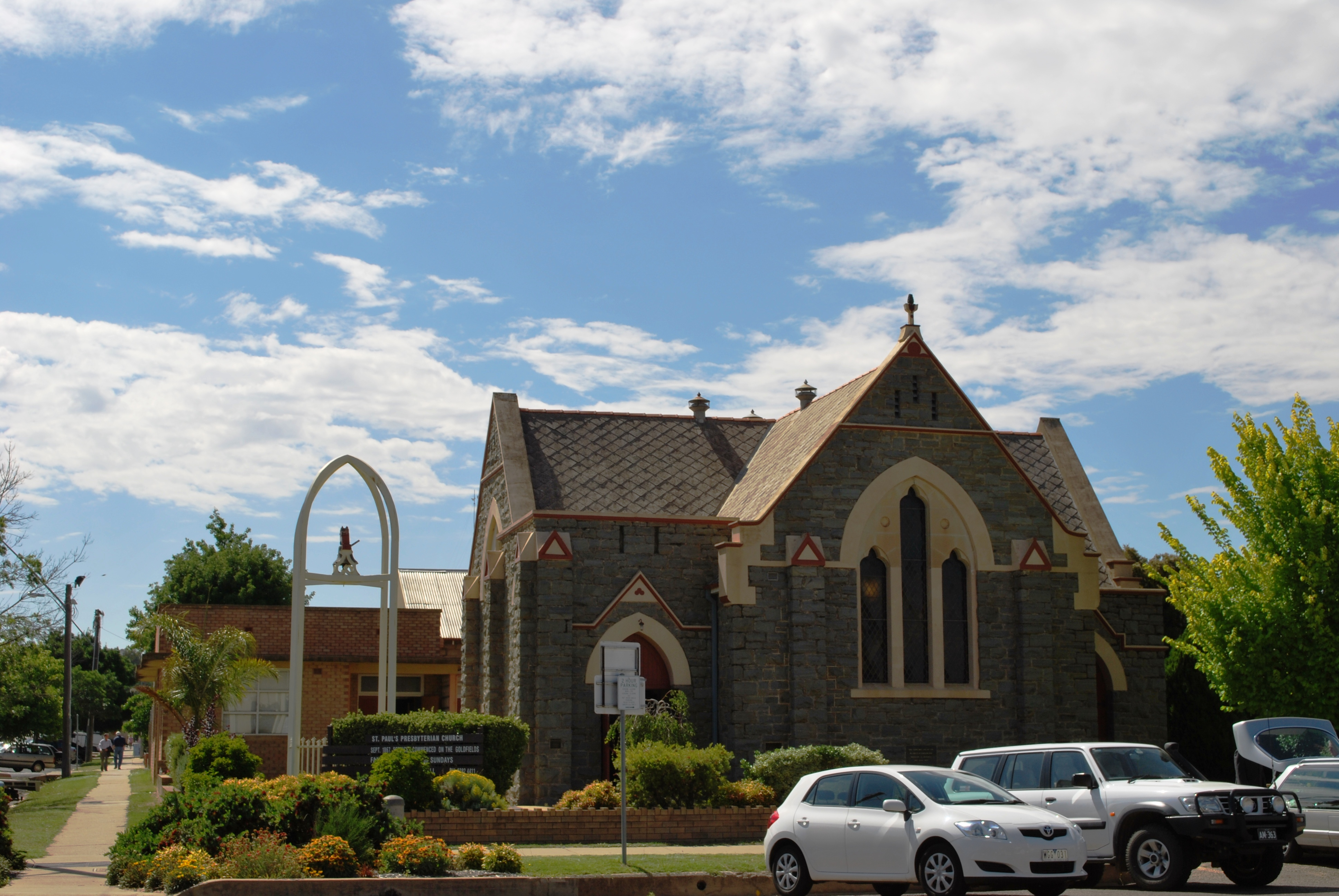
St Paul's

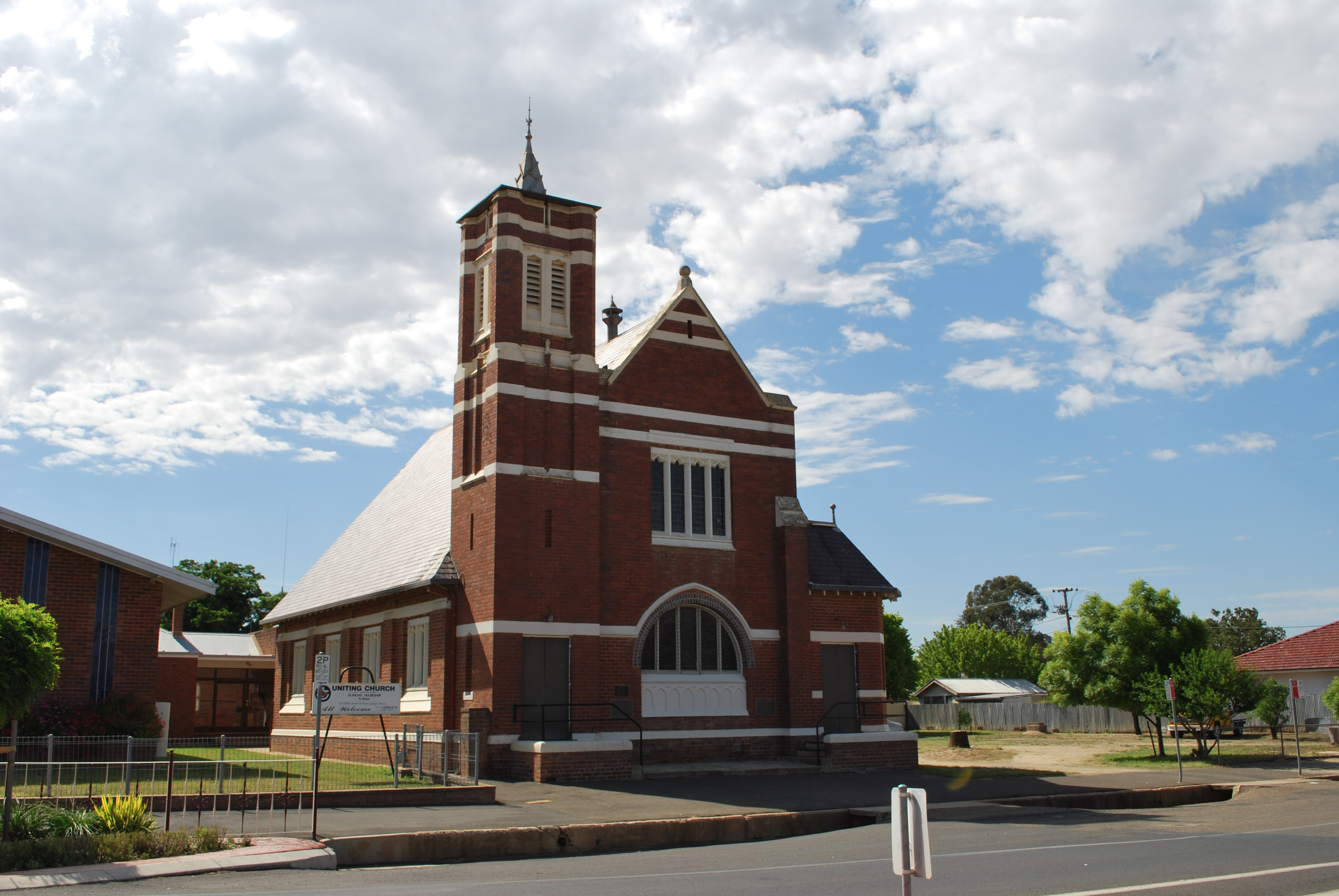
Young Uniting Church

== Notable people ==
- Charles Anderson VC, MC (1897–1988), a Member of Parliament
- Peter Carnley, former Anglican Archbishop of Perth
- Dorothy M. Catts (1877–1961), writer, editor and businesswoman
- Donald Chalmers AO, Chief of Navy from 1997 to 1999
- Thomas Collins (1884–1945), a Member of Parliament
- Rose Ann Creal, matron, recipient of the Royal Red Cross (First Class)
- Peter Cusack, a rugby league footballer
- Libby Gleeson, a children's author
- Bert Hopkins, an Australian cricketer
- Ron Lynch, a rugby league footballer and coach
- Nathan Lyon, an Australian cricketer
- Frances MacKeith, British peace advocate
- Roger McDonald, an author
- Brendon Reeves, a rugby league player
- Kerry Saxby-Junna, double Commonwealth Games gold medal racewalker
- Brett Mullins, a rugby league player
- Tom Sargent, a racing driver
- James Schiller, a rugby league player
- Isaac Smith, AFL footballer
