= City Bank building =

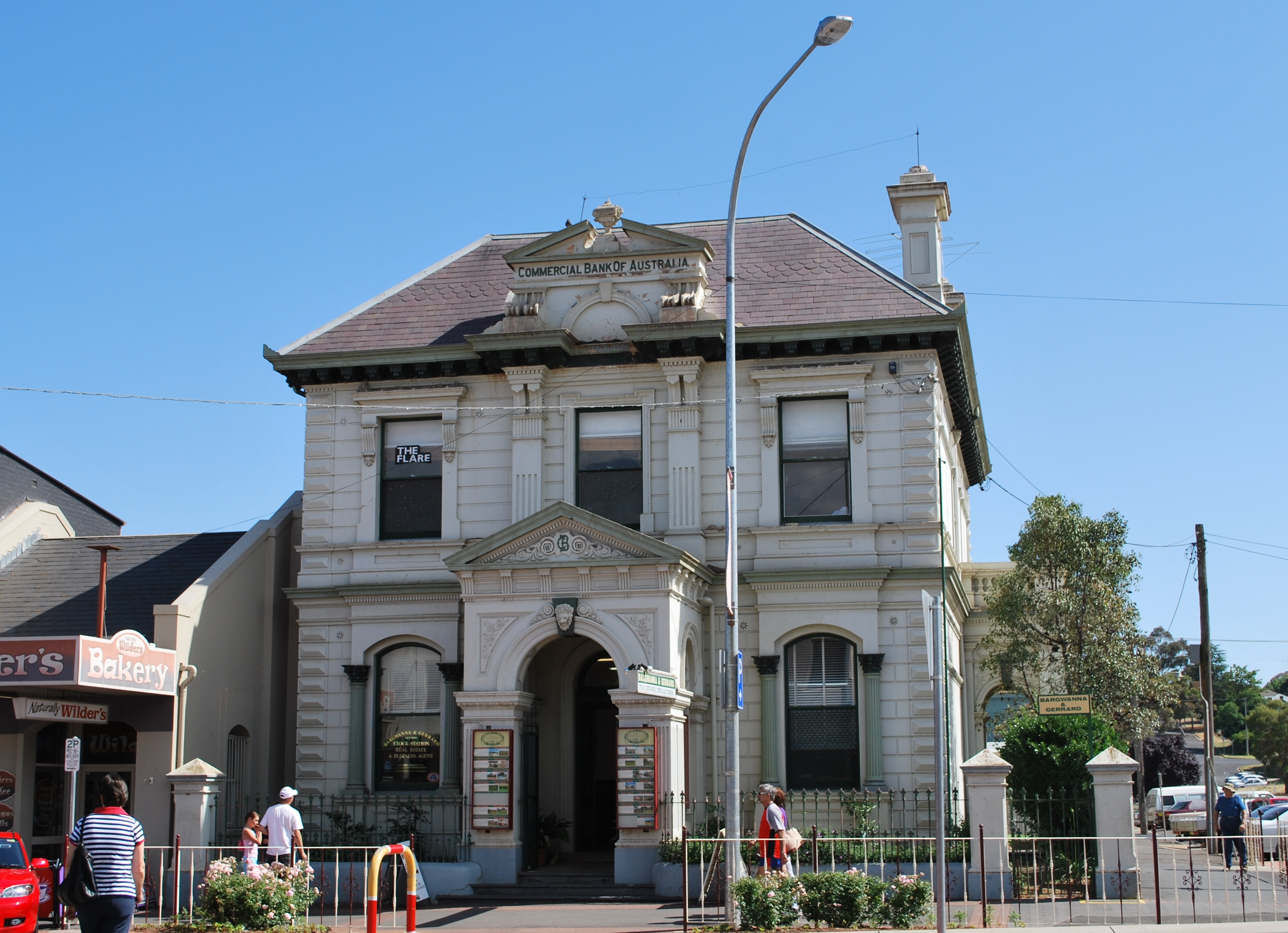
- Former City Bank and Commercial Bank of Australia building, now used by a real estate agent, pictured in 2008.

- Location of the City Bank building in New South Wales City Bank building (Australia)
- 34°18′47″S 148°17′52″E
- Location: Lynch Street, Young, Hilltops Council, New South Wales, Australia

Site notes
- Owner: Graham and Joy Bargwanna

New South Wales Heritage Register
- Official name: City Bank (former); City Bank
- Type: State heritage (built)
- Designated: 2 April 1999
- Reference no.: 710
- Type: Bank
- Category: Commercial

The City Bank building is a heritage-listed former bank building on the corner of Lynch Street and Booroowa Street, Young, in the South Western Slopes region of New South Wales, Australia. It is also known as the former City Bank. The property is privately owned by Graham and Joy Bargwanna. The building was added to the New South Wales State Heritage Register on 2 April 1999.

== History ==
The Bank, described as "handsome premises at one of the principal street corners", was constructed by Sydney contractors, Evans and Son, in 1889.

== Heritage listing ==
The City Bank building was listed on the New South Wales State Heritage Register on 2 April 1999.
