= Frances MacKeith =

British peace advocate

- Born: 28 March 1914; Young, New South Wales
- Died: 14 November 2011 (aged 97)
- Occupation: Peace advocate
- Spouse: Stephen MacKeith

Frances MacKeith, also known as Jo, (28 March 1914 – 14 December 2011) was a British peace advocate.

== Biography ==
MacKeith was born on 28 March 1914 in Young, New South Wales. Her father, Millais Culpin, and mother were both doctors, and travelled with her extensively. In 1931, they attended a Nazi rally in Berlin. MacKeith grew up in Loughton and attended school in Buckhurst Hill. In 1936, MacKeith graduated from University College London with a degree in German. In 1938, she married Stephen MacKeith; they had six children. She spent the period of the Second World War in Australia.

A German teacher for much of her life, MacKeith also advocated for peace during the Aldermaston Marches in the 1950s and demonstrations against the Vietnam War in Grosvenor Square in the 1960s. After the protests, she joined the Quakers, and continued to protest war into her nineties. At age 71, she was one of 22 people charged after a protest blocked access to a military base, and told the court, "I did not come all the way from my home in Winchester to Sandy Lane just to obstruct Sandy Lane. I am a member of the Society of Friends known as Quakers, and for 300 years that body has done what we call witnessing for peace. That was what I was doing in Sandy Lane." She was arrested for protest-related activity over five times during her life.

MacKeith worked against the Trident nuclear programme and taught prisoners in Winchester Prison. She also supported research into Black history. MacKeith died on 14 December 2011.
