= 1955 Cook by-election =

A by-election was held for the Australian House of Representatives seat of Cook on 21 May 1955. This was triggered by the death of Labor MP Tom Sheehan.

The by-election was won by Labor candidate Jim Cope. The governing Liberal Party did not nominate a candidate, which resulted in Cope receiving over 85% of the first preference vote.

== Results ==
Cook by-election, 1955
Party	Candidate	Votes	%	±%
Labor	Jim Cope	21,411	86.8	+3.4
Independent	John Somerville-Smith	3,248	13.2	+13.2
Total formal votes		24,659	96.8	
Informal votes		814	3.2	
Turnout		25,473	76.0	
Labor hold		Swing	−3.6	
