= Roccy FM =

Young, New South Wales; Australia
- Broadcast area: South West Slopes
- Frequency: 93.9 MHz FM

Programming
- Format: Hot Adult Contemporary

Ownership
- Owner: Broadcast Operations Group; (Super Young 939 FM Pty Ltd)
- Sister stations: 2LF

History
- Call sign meaning: Lambing Flats FM

Technical information
- Power: 40kW
- Transmitter coordinates: 34.34361°S 148.33556°E
- Translators: 99.5 MHz Cowra; 107.7 MHz Cootamundra; 104.1 MHz Temora

Links
- Website: http://www.roccyfm.com.au/Roccy_FM.html

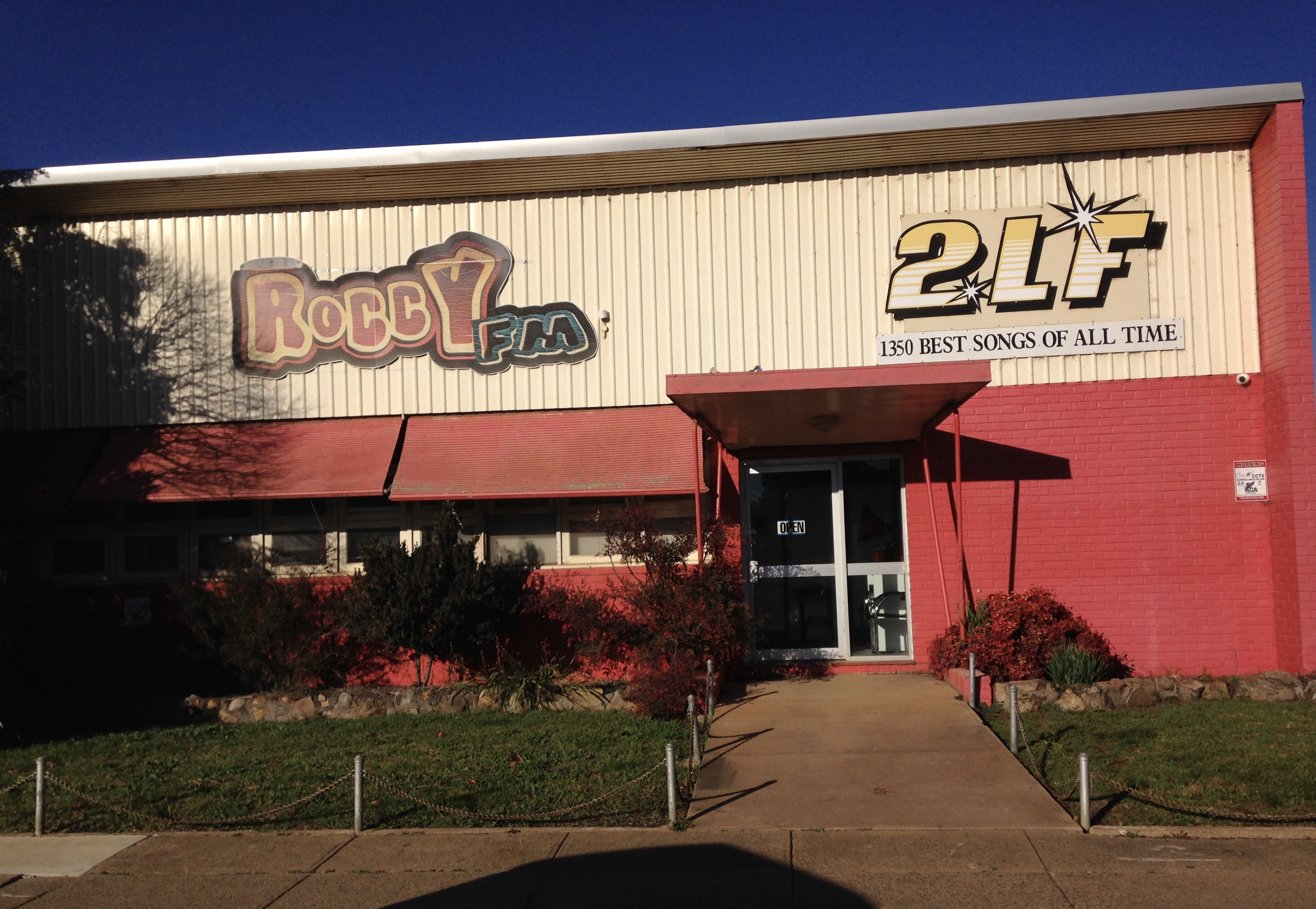
ROCCY FM and 2LF radio stations

Roccy FM (ACMA callsign: 2LFF) is an Australian radio station that transmits on 93.9 MHz FM from Young, New South Wales, Australia and serves the towns in the South West Slopes region such as Cowra and Cootamundra.

== History ==
Roccy FM was first broadcast as FM93.9 as supplementary FM radio station to sister station 2LF, before rebranding as Star FM. This lasted until mid-2008, when owners Macquarie Media Group purchased stations from Southern Cross Broadcasting, and was made to sell both Star FM and 2LF. It was purchased by Broadcast Operations Group, and was made to drop the Star FM branding.

After holding a competition to suggest new names for the station, the breakfast duo at that time, Daniel Sewart and Rick Knight, announced that Roccy FM had been selected after listeners voted on their favourite selection from a short list of entrants. Roccy is a backronym for Radio of Cowra Cootamundra and Young, the largest towns in the stations broadcast area.
