= Jock Garden =

Australian clergyman, trade unionist and politician

John Garden
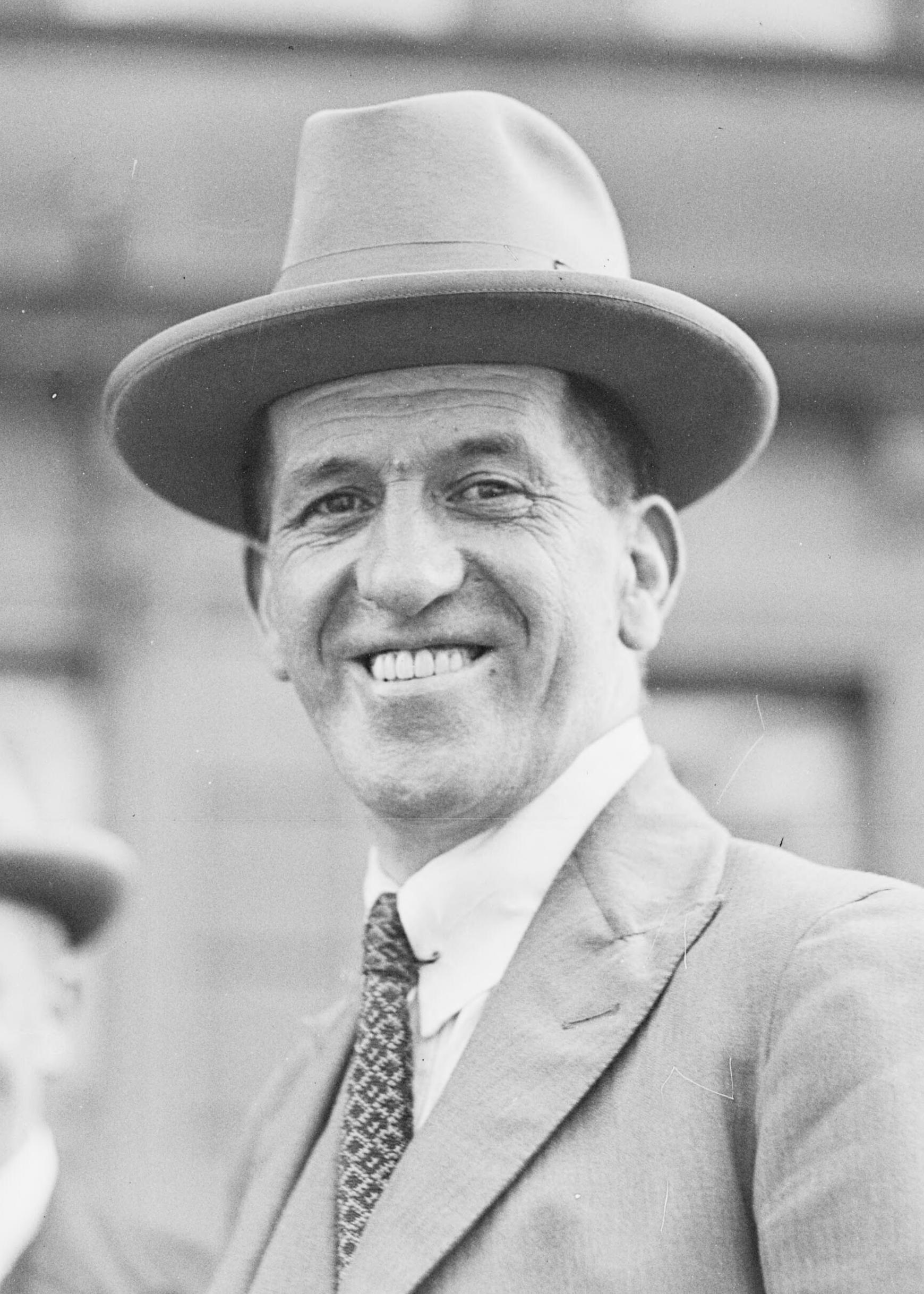

Member of the Australian Parliament for Cook
- In office 15 September 1934 – 21 September 1937
- Preceded by: Edward Riley
- Succeeded by: Tom Sheehan

Personal details
- Born: 13 August 1882 Lossiemouth, Scotland
- Died: 31 December 1968 (aged 86) Sydney, Australia
- Party: Labor (1909–1919, 1936–37)
- Other political affiliations: Industrial Socialist Labor (1919); Communist (1920–1926); Lang Labor (1934–1936)
- Spouse: Jeannie May Ritchie
- Occupation: Clergyman

John Smith "Jock" Garden (13 August 1882 – 31 December 1968) was an Australian clergyman, trade unionist and politician. He was one of the founders of the Communist Party of Australia.

== Early life ==
Garden was born on 13 August 1882 in Nigg, Aberdeen, Scotland. He was the second son of Ann (née Smith) and Alexander Garden; his parents were both employed in the fishing industry.

Garden attended a state school at Lossiemouth. He was then apprenticed as a sailmaker with his cousin. His brother immigrated to Australia in the 1890s and the rest of the family joined him in 1904.

== Labor politician ==
In 1906, Garden was a Church of Christ minister at Harcourt, Victoria. The next year on 6 May in Melbourne, with the forms of that church, he married Jeannie May Ritchie, from Leith, Scotland. By 1909 he was a member of the Labor Party and also a Baptist preacher at Maclean, New South Wales. In 1914 he was living at Paddington and working intermittently at his trade; he became the president of the Sailmakers' Union and its delegate on the Labor Council of New South Wales, which was to be his power base until 1934. In 1916 he was elected assistant secretary of the council, and in 1918 became its secretary. He failed as a Labor candidate at Parramatta in the 1917 State elections. Before that, Garden was employed from 1915 by the Department of Defence at its ordnance store at Circular Quay. In 1916 he was fined £10 for improperly accepting a gift from a supplier to the department and was dismissed on 14 March 1917 year after admitting that he had destroyed an important voucher.

Garden's oratorical style, coupled with a strong Scots' burr, ranged from captivating to ranting, adaptable to the pulpit and the Trades Hall. His speeches were quite often rambling tirades, but seldom unproductive. He read non-conformist and radical literature including Karl Marx and Vladimir Lenin enthusiastically after the 1917 Russian revolution. The times were auspicious for Garden on the Labor Council in 1916–18. World War I and conscription divided the Labor movement. In 1916 the Labor state premier, William Holman, along with other moderate politicians were expelled and formed the conservative National government.

The triumphant unionist wing, led by the Industrial Vigilance Council, became even more left wing. Some moderate unions left the Labor Council. The Industrial Vigilance Council tried to make the Labor Party the political arm of the One Big Union (OBU), a radical scheme. The Australian Workers' Union made the turmoil worse by trying to make itself a non-revolutionary O.B.U. with the support of some moderate politicians and unions. Garden was expelled in 1919 from the Labor Party for advocating revolutionary socialism. For a time he was a member of the Industrial Socialist Labor Party.

== Communist ==
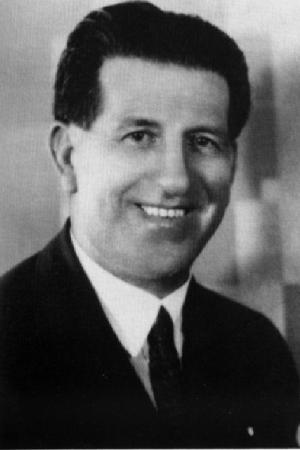
Garden c. 1925

In November 1920 Garden announced the formation of the Communist Party of Australia, which he had initiated with William Earsman. Garden was prominent in 1921 at the All-Australian Trade Union Congress in Melbourne, which wanted to impose a positive socialist policy on the Australian Labor Party. He rapidly became one of its most prominent figures, leading a group of militant trade unionists known as the "Trades Hall Reds."

Under Garden's leadership the CPA concentrated on trying to gain control of the New South Wales trade unions, and through them to re-enter the Labor Party (which was based on affiliated trade unions). This led to a split in the CPA, with more radical members rejecting the attempt to re-enter the Labor Party. In 1922, however, Garden attended the Congress of the Communist International in Moscow, which endorsed his strategy. Although the Labor Party, under its parliamentary leader Jack Lang, rejected Communism, Garden as Secretary of the Trades Hall was a powerful figure in the labour movement, and in 1923 he was readmitted to the Labor Party and elected to its state executive.

In 1924, however, Lang regained control of the New South Wales Labor Party and had Garden and other Communists once again expelled from the party, a decision which was upheld by the federal executive. This was the end of the CPA's attempts to take over the Labor Party, and by 1925 the CPA had become mainly an appendage of Garden's machine in the Sydney Trades Hall. At the 1925 state elections the CPA ran candidates, including Garden, against Labor candidates in working-class seats and was heavily defeated. This convinced Garden that the CPA had no future, and in 1926 he left the party.

== Return to Labor ==
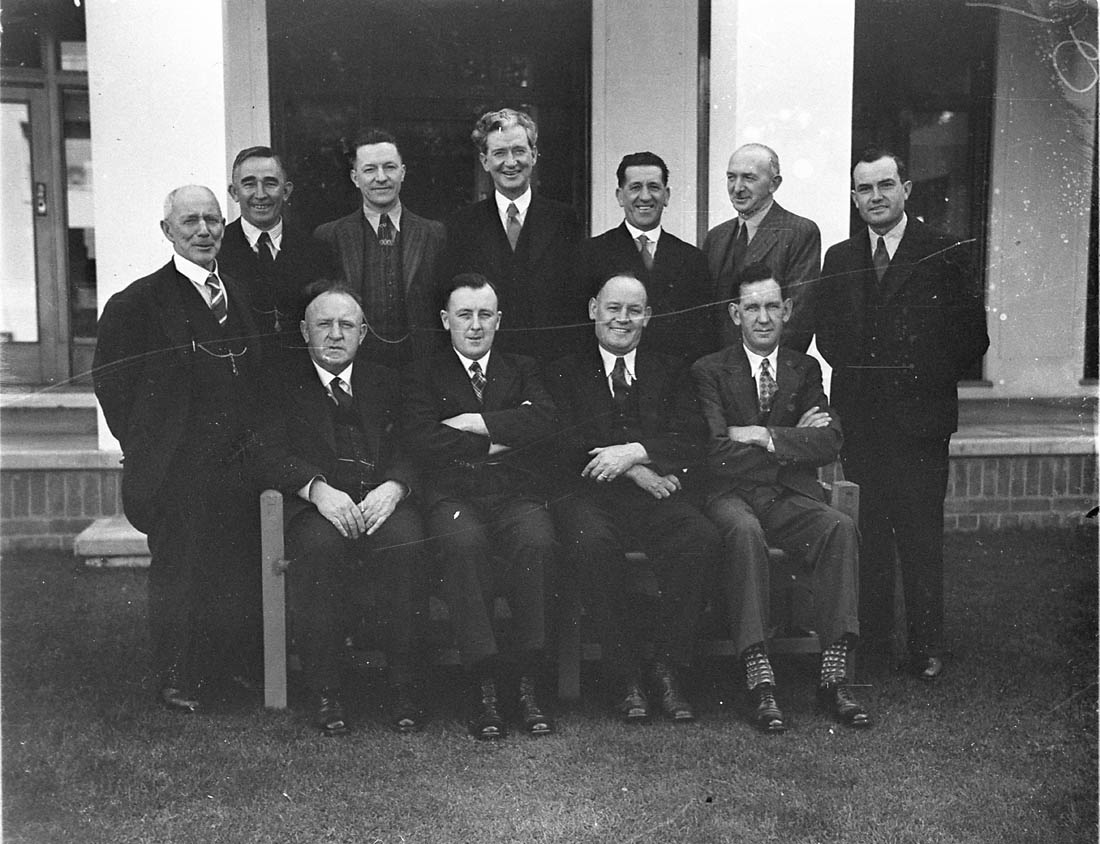
Lang Labor MPs in 1935 including Garden

In September 1926, Garden announced his resignation from the Communist Party and his intention to seek readmission to the ALP; he was not formally re-admitted to the ALP until January 1929. He remained active in the labour movement and was involved in the creation of the Australian Council of Trade Unions (ACTU) in 1927, being narrowly defeated by Charlie Crofts in the election to become its inaugural secretary. He also remained involved with Communist front organisations such as the Red International of Labor Unions and Pan-Pacific Trade Union Secretariat (PPTUS), and in 1927 was controversially denied a passport to attend a PPTUS conference in China by the Bruce–Page government.

Despite their earlier conflict, Garden soon reconciled himself to Lang's leadership and by the late 1920s had emerged as one of Lang's key allies. While retaining his power base in the Trades Hall, he was elected an Alderman of the Sydney City Council, and a member of the executive of the Australian Council of Trade Unions. He also ran the Labor Council's radio station, 2KY. In 1931, when the Labor Party split over the Scullin government's response to the Great Depression, Garden became a leading supporter of Lang's faction, which rejected Scullin's policies and favoured repudiating Australia's debt to British bondholders.

Garden stood for the House of Representatives at the 1931 election as a Lang Labor candidate in the Division of Cook in inner Sydney. He was unsuccessful, but at the 1934 election he was elected – the first of a number of ex-Communists to become Labor parliamentarians. However, when the Labor Party was re-united under John Curtin's leadership in 1936, Garden was dropped as a candidate as part of the peace settlement, and at the 1937 elections he retired from Parliament.

When Labor came to office federally in 1941, Garden was employed by Eddie Ward, a former Lang Labor man who was Minister for External Territories from 1943 to 1949. In this capacity he travelled to Papua New Guinea, then an Australian possession, and was involved in the corrupt sale of timber leases to various business friends. In 1946 a Royal Commission found that Garden had engaged in corrupt conduct, and he was subsequently convicted of fraud and sentenced to three years imprisonment.

In 1949 Malcolm Henry Ellis intent upon showing the connections between the Communist movement and the ALP of the later 1940s, and ignoring Garden's 1920s leaving the party, wrote a book The Garden Path: The Story of the saturation of the Australian Labour Movement by Communism.

== Later life ==
Garden was released from gaol in July 1950, having served two years and two months. He began his sentence at Long Bay, but was later moved to the prison farm at Tumbarumba and was granted early release for good conduct. After his release he returned to his flat at Double Bay.

Jock Garden disappeared from public life and died in hospital on 31 December 1968. He was cremated with Church of Christ forms and was survived by his wife, one of his two sons and one of his two daughters.

== Notes ==
Parliament of Australia
Preceded by Edward Riley	Member for Cook; 1934–1937	Succeeded by Tom Sheehan
