= James Catts =

Australian politician

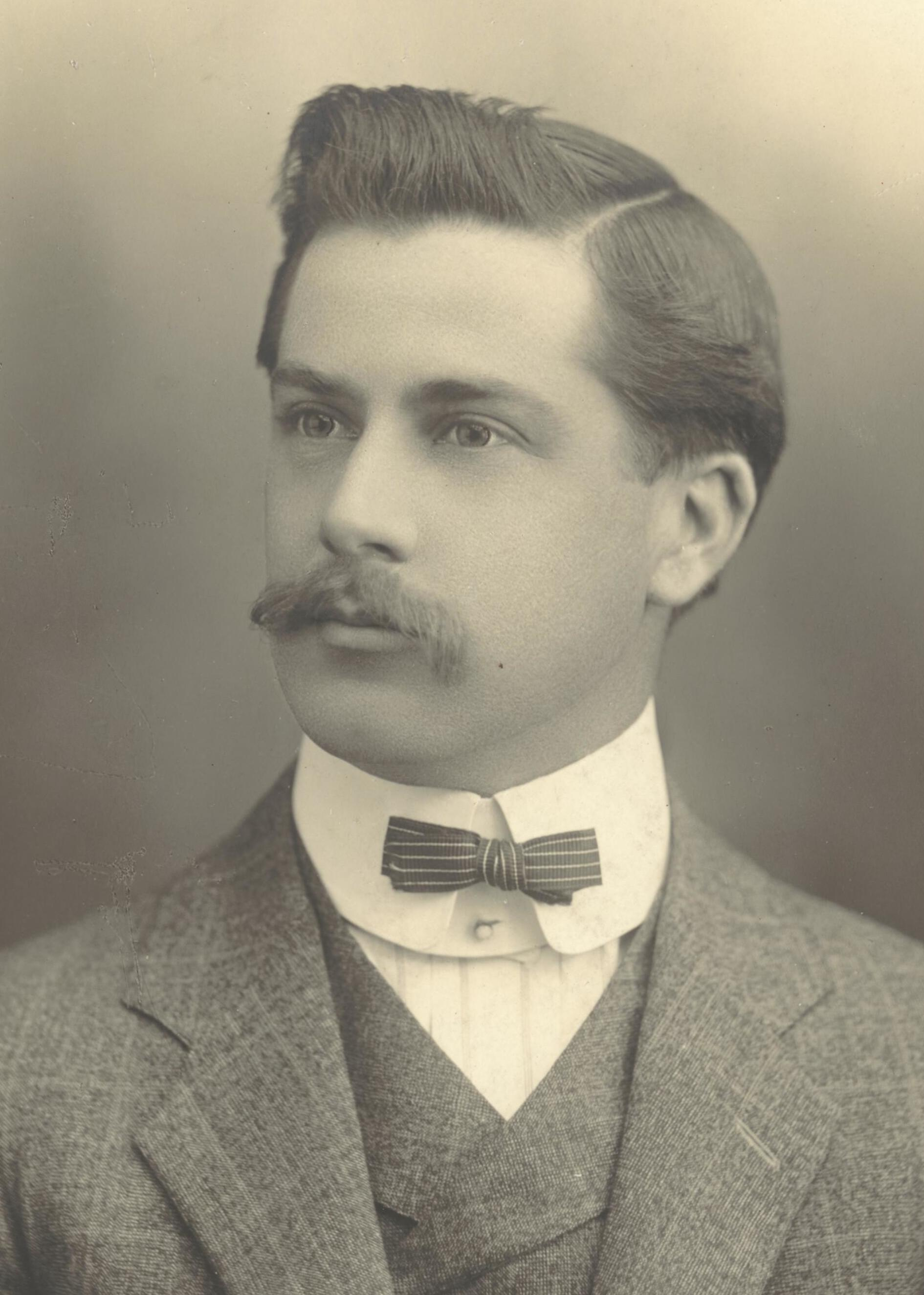

Member of the Australian Parliament for Cook
- In office 12 December 1906 – 16 December 1922
- Preceded by: New seat
- Succeeded by: Edward Riley

Personal details
- Born: 12 August 1877 Wagga Wagga, New South Wales
- Died: 26 November 1951 (aged 74) Huntleys Point, New South Wales
- Party: Labor (1906–22); MLP (1922)
- Spouses: Eva Weber (m. 1907; div. 1920) Dorothy Purcell (m. 1920)
- Occupation: Unionist

James Howard Catts (12 August 1877 – 26 November 1951) was an Australian politician, unionist and businessman.

== Early life ==
Catts was born on 12 August 1877 in Wagga Wagga, New South Wales. He was the son of Amy (née Hedger) and James Catts; his father was a joiner and grocer. He was raised by his paternal grandfather in Sydney, living in Stanmore and attending the Macdonaldtown public school. He returned to live with his parents in Orange at the age of thirteen. The family established a bakery in Forbes in 1894. Catts helped in the family business and also worked as a labourer and shearers' cook.

At the age of 17, he became the secretary of the Farmers and Settlers' and the Progress associations at Forbes, and was general secretary of the United Progress Association of New South Wales from 1900 to 1903. He was also organising secretary of the New South Wales Temperance Alliance, and held other prominent positions in railway unions. From 1913 to 1914 he became general secretary of the Australian Union Federation and president of the Australasian Labour Federation, and founded the United Secretaries' Association in 1915.

== Politics ==
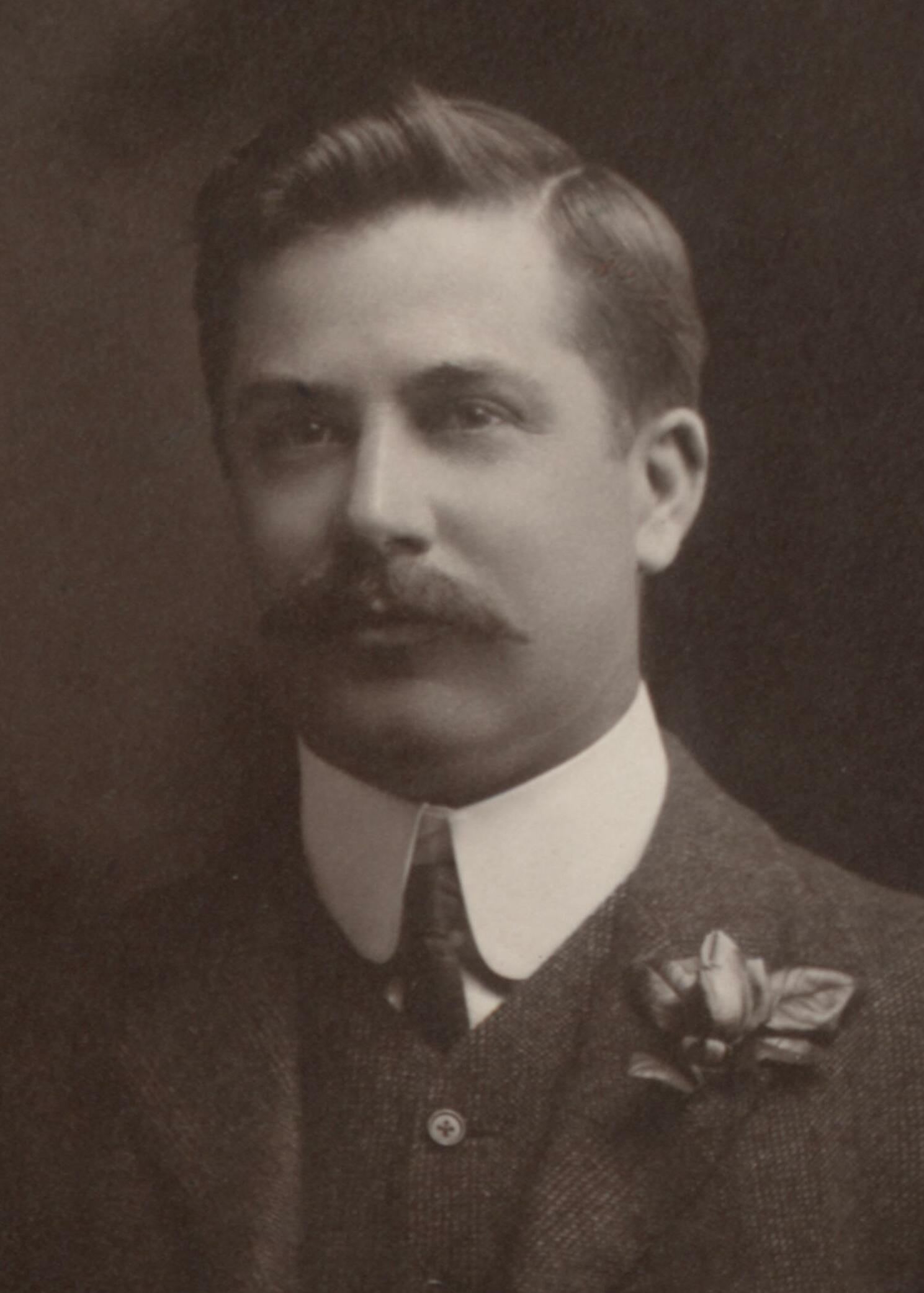
Catts in 1908

Catts's first attempt to enter politics was unsuccessful, running in the 1904 state election as the Labor candidate for Granville. He became the youngest member of the Australian House of Representatives in 1906 when he was elected to the seat of Cook at the age of 28, and became associated with King O'Malley and Billy Hughes. He became known as a protectionist and nationalist in Parliament. In Sydney on 12 August 1907, he married Eva Alice Weber; they were divorced in 1920.

On 18 August 1910, Catts was suspended from the House of Representatives for one day, the first member to be suspended. This was because he referred to a statement by Elliot Johnson as "a dirty, skunky thing to say", and also referred to members opposite as "you dirty skunks". Catts was director of the Federal and State Labor campaigns in New South Wales from 1914 to 1922. He was also the director of voluntary recruiting in New South Wales 1915–16, producing the weekly magazine Call to Arms. He was also an opponent of communism and conscription, and was prosecuted for asserting that Japan hoped to annexe Australia. He married for the second time on 8 September 1920, again at Sydney, Dorothy Marguerite Purcell.

Catts was expelled from the Labor Party in 1922 having been accused of sectarianism, and unsuccessfully ran at the elections for the Majority Labor Party.

== Later life ==
Catts continued to be active in the Labor Party, running unsuccessfully as the Federal Labor candidate for Martin in 1931. He was opposed to the Lang Labor Party, but unsuccessfully ran in East Sydney in 1940 as a United Australia Party candidate. In 1944, he failed to be elected to Sydney Municipal Council, and subsequently retired.

In his retirement, Catts became secretary and treasurer of the New South Wales branch of the British Astronomical Association, devoting more time to his hobby of astronomy. He died on 26 November 1951 at Huntleys Point, and was survived by his second wife, their son and three daughters.

== Personal life ==
Catts married Eva Alice Weber in 1907, with whom he had one son. In 1919, his first wife petitioned for divorce on the grounds of adultery, alleging her husband had engaged in an extramarital affair with Dorothy Purcell that resulted in the birth of a child. The case attracted significant media attention given his status as a federal MP. His first wife was awarded alimony, with the presiding judge finding that Catts had illegally concealed assets in order to reduce the settlement.

After the granting of the divorce, Catts married Purcell in September 1920. The couple had one son and three daughters together. He died on 26 November 1951 at Huntleys Point, New South Wales, aged 74. After his death, Dorothy Catts published biographies both of her husband and of his political ally King O'Malley.

Parliament of Australia
Preceded by new seat	Member for Cook; 1906-1922	Succeeded by Edward Riley
