= Jim Cope =

Australian politician (1907–1999)

The Honourable Jim Cope CMG
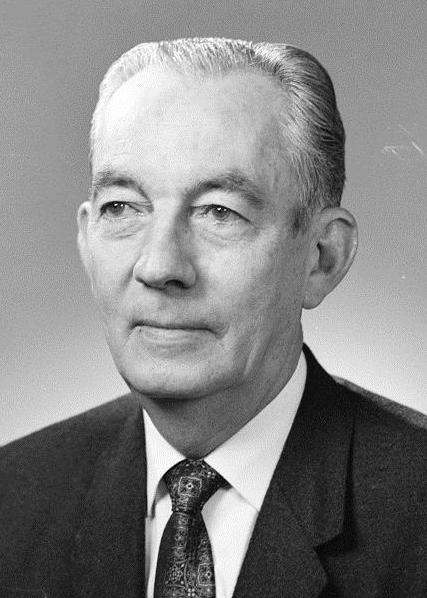
- Cope in 1970

Speaker of the Australian House of Representatives
- In office 27 February 1973 – 27 February 1975
- Preceded by: Sir William Aston
- Succeeded by: Gordon Scholes

Member of the Australian Parliament for Cook
- In office 21 May 1955 – 10 December 1955
- Preceded by: Tom Sheehan
- Succeeded by: Seat abolished

Member of the Australian Parliament for Watson
- In office 10 December 1955 – 25 October 1969
- Preceded by: Dan Curtin
- Succeeded by: Seat abolished

Member of the Australian Parliament for Sydney
- In office 25 October 1969 – 11 November 1975
- Preceded by: New seat
- Succeeded by: Les McMahon

Personal details
- Born: 26 November 1907 Surry Hills, New South Wales, Australia
- Died: 3 February 1999 (aged 91) Sydney, Australia
- Party: Labor
- Spouse: Myrtle Hurst (m. 1932)
- Occupation: Glassworker

James Francis Cope CMG (26 November 1907 – 3 February 1999) was an Australian politician. He was a member of the Australian Labor Party (ALP) and served in the House of Representatives from 1955 to 1975. He was Speaker of the House of Representatives from 1973 to 1975, resigning abruptly in dramatic circumstances, when he was in the Chair presiding over question time, when he came into conflict with Prime Minister Gough Whitlam.

== Early life ==
Cope was born 26 November 1907 in Surry Hills, New South Wales. He was the youngest of five sons born to Martha (née Ellem) and George Eugene Cope. His father worked as a compositor and was a "strong supporter of the Australian Labor Party".

Cope attended Crown Street Public School and Bourke Street Public School. He left school after two years of secondary education and began working as a messenger boy. He later worked as a machinist at the Randwick Tramway Workshops, but was retrenched during the Great Depression and relied on the dole for three years. He also worked part-time as a cricket umpire and billiard marker. During World War II, Cope worked for Amalgamated Wireless Valve making glass tubes for use in radar. After the war's end, he manufactured glass for laboratories. He served as federal treasurer of the Australian Glass Workers' Union from 1952 to 1955.

== Politics ==
Cope joined the ALP in 1930 and became president of its Redfern branch. He was elected to the Redfern Municipal Council in 1948.

Following the death of the incumbent Labor MP Tom Sheehan, Cope was elected to the House of Representatives at the 1955 Cook by-election. His seat was abolished in a redistribution, but he switched to Watson at the 1955 federal election. He held Watson until its abolition in 1969, when he transferred to the new seat of Sydney.

=== Speakership ===
On 27 February 1973, Cope was appointed the first Labor Speaker of the House since 1950. On 27 February 1975, the second anniversary of his election as speaker, he resigned after the Whitlam government refused to support him when he named Clyde Cameron, a government minister. Cope retired from parliament at the double dissolution election of 11 November 1975.

== Later life ==
In the New Year's Honours of 1978, he was appointed a Companion of the Order of St Michael and St George (CMG), for his services to the parliament.

Cope died in 1999.

Parliament of Australia
Preceded by William Aston	Speaker of the Australian House of Representatives; 1973–1975	Succeeded by Gordon Scholes
Preceded by Tom Sheehan	Member for Cook; 1955	Succeeded by Division abolished
Preceded by Dan Curtin	Member for Watson; 1955–1969	Succeeded by Division abolished
Preceded by New seat	Member for Sydney; 1969–1975	Succeeded by Les McMahon
