= 2LF =

- Young, New South Wales; Australia
- Frequency: 1350 kHz

Programming
- Format: News talk, Classic hits

Ownership
- Owner: Broadcast Operations Group; (Super Young 2LF Pty Ltd)
- Sister stations: Roccy FM

History
- First air date: 16 February 1938
- Former frequencies: 1340 kHz (1938–1978); 1359 kHz (1978–1984)
- Call sign meaning: Lambing Flats

Technical information
- ERP: 5kW
- Transmitter coordinates: 34.3444°S 148.3339°E
- Translators: 105.3 MHz Cootamundra; 100.7 MHz Cowra, Grenfell; 104.9 MHz Harden, Temora

Links
- Website: www.2lf.com.au

2LF is an Australian radio station serving the Young region and is part of the Super Radio Network with its sister station Roccy FM. It was opened in February 1938.

The LF stands for Lambing Flats and the station broadcasts on the AM dial on 1350 kilohertz and a power of 5 kilowatts – more than double the power of neighbouring radio stations 2WG Wagga Wagga, 2GN Goulburn and 2PK Parkes, all of which are rated at 2 kW. This may be due to the varying heights of the towns of Young, Cowra and Cootamundra – 2LF's core audience.

Many famous names in Australian broadcasting and television either began their career at 2LF or worked there, including Ken Sutcliffe, Ray Warren and Mike Connors. 2LF only became a 24-hour radio service in the late 1980s. Prior to this it finished broadcasting for the day after the midnight news and resumed with a test broadcast after 5am (which involved playing an album) before officially starting with the national anthem leading into the 5:30am news. When 2LF went "24 hours" it took programming from the co-owned 2WG Wagga Wagga with the on air branding of 2WG/2LF. 2WG itself took overnight satellite music programming from 2UW in Sydney which at that time provided radio network services to about 80 stations nationally.

== Programming ==
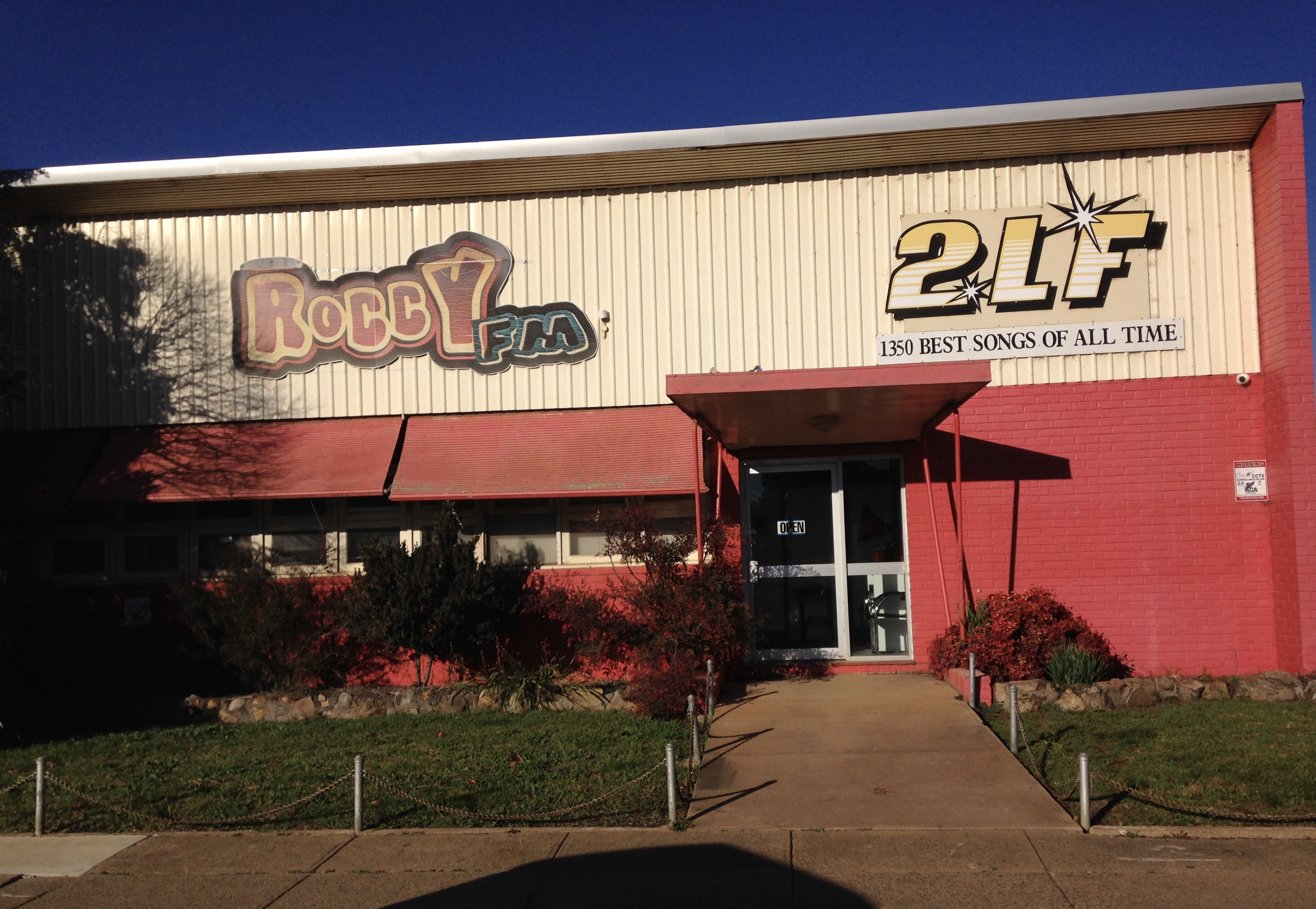
2LF and ROCCY FM radio stations

- Early Breakfast With Richard King
- The Breakfast Crunch With Richard Spence
- Mornings With Chris Smith
- Country News Hour
- Afternoons With Dave Cochrane
- Talkin' Sport
- Sportsday NSW
- The Nightline With Cheralyn Darcey
- Talk Overnight With Gary Stewart

== News ==
- Phillip Horn
