= Edward Charles Riley =

Australian politician

Edward Riley
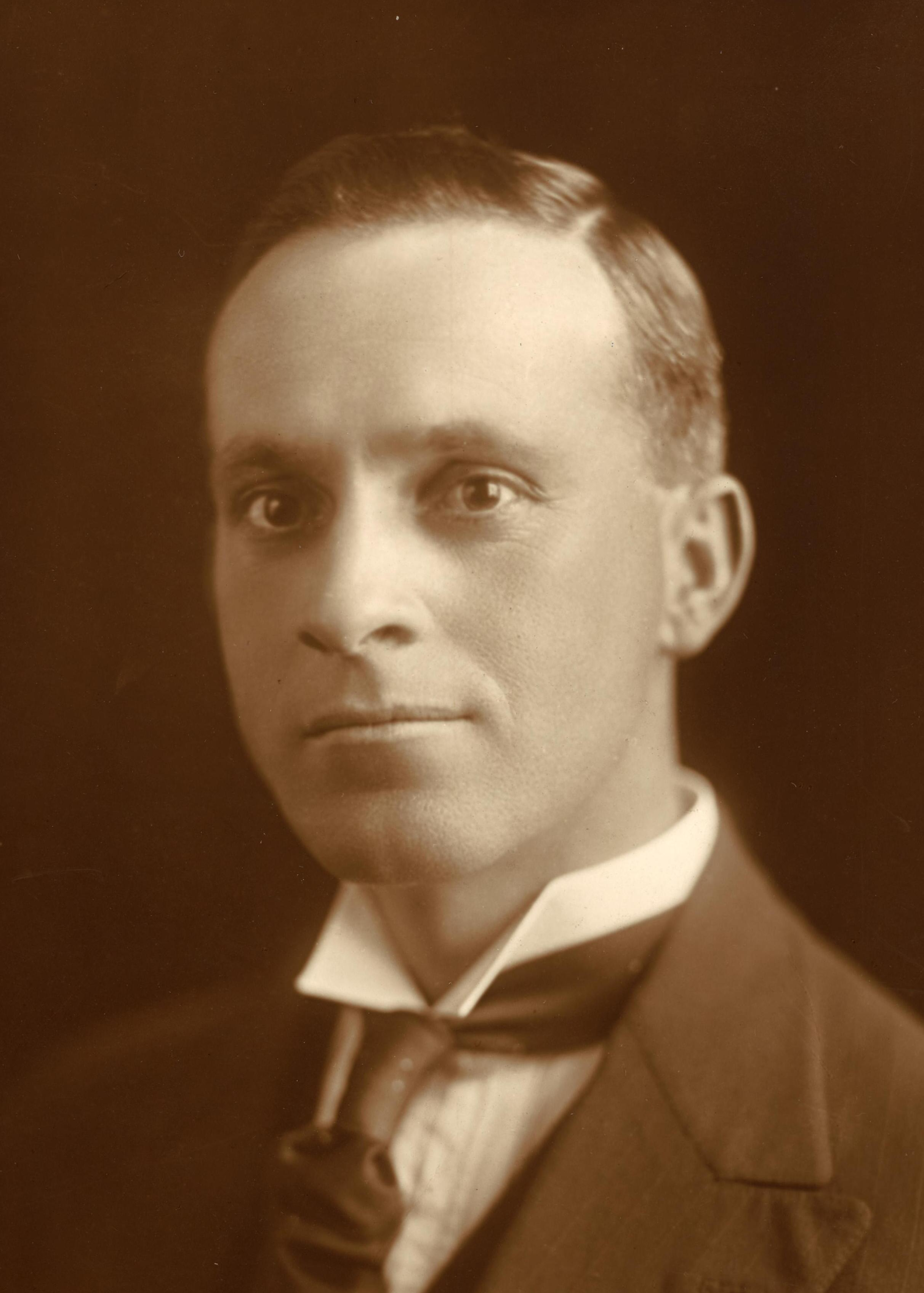

Member of the Australian Parliament for Cook
- In office 16 December 1922 – 15 September 1934
- Preceded by: James Catts
- Succeeded by: Jock Garden

Personal details
- Born: 9 August 1892
- Died: 9 June 1969 (aged 76)
- Party: Australian Labor Party

Edward Charles Riley (9 August 1892 – 9 June 1969) was an Australian politician. He was an Australian Labor Party member of the Australian House of Representatives from 1922 to 1934, representing the seat of Cook.

Riley was the son of Labor politician Edward Riley. Prior to entering politics, he worked at the Cockatoo Island Dockyard, served as secretary of the Commonwealth Public Service Clerical Officers Association and later as NSW state secretary of the Federated Clerks' Union. He enlisted to serve in World War I in September 1916, serving until April 1919.

He was elected to the House of Representatives at the 1922 election following a contentious Labor preselection that had to be re-run twice following allegations of irregularities. His victory resulted in the first time a father and son had sat together in federal parliament. He served as Government Whip from 1929. He held the seat until 1934, when he was defeated by Jock Garden, the Lang Labor candidate.

After leaving politics, Riley became a prominent advertising executive and served on the board of trustees of the Australian War Memorial from 1930 to 1966. He died in 1969.

Parliament of Australia
Preceded by James Catts	Member for Cook; 1922 – 1934	Succeeded by Jock Garden
