= Tom Sheehan (politician) =

Australian politician (1891–1955)

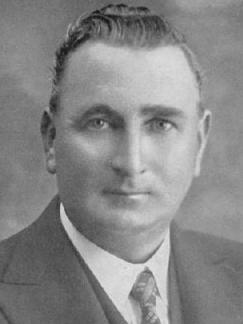

Member of the Australian Parliament for Cook
- In office 23 October 1937 – 26 March 1955
- Preceded by: Jock Garden
- Succeeded by: Jim Cope

Personal details
- Born: 14 April 1891 Sydney
- Died: 26 March 1955 (aged 63)
- Party: Labor (1937–40); Lang Labor (1940–41); Labor (1941–55)
- Occupation: Engine-driver, unionist

Thomas Sheehan (14 April 1891 – 26 March 1955) was an Australian politician. Born in Sydney, he attended Catholic schools before becoming an engine-driver and official of the Australian Federated Union of Locomotive Enginemen. He was involved in local politics as a member of Newtown City Council. In 1937, he was elected to the Australian House of Representatives as the Labor member for Cook. In 1940, when the New South Wales Caucus of the Labor Party split, Sheehan joined the Australian Labor Party (Non-Communist) under the leadership of Jack Lang. However, in 1941 John Curtin reunited the party, and Sheehan and the other Lang Labor members rejoined the federal ALP. He held the seat for the rest of his life. Thomas married Annie O'Mara and had four children, Stanley, Thomas, May and Kenneth.

On Tuesday 19 April 1955, the Prime Minister, Sir Robert Menzies, in his House of Representatives speech, paid tribute to the recently deceased Sheehan, crediting him with having "possessed the most remarkable charm and generosity." Menzies went further to illustrate that Mr Sheehan who had sat in the House for eighteen years "[had] no enemies." ALP leader H. V. Evatt described Sheehan, on the same occasion, as "kindness itself to new members." Robert Joshua, leader of the Democratic Labor Party, and Sheehan's great friend Fred Daly (Labor member for the electorate of Grayndler), also expressed their sympathies.

On the same day Mr Sheehan was spoken about warmly in the Australian Senate by Senators O' Sullivan (Queensland), McKenna (Tasmania), and Armstrong (NSW). Mr Armstrong said that "He lavished on his family an affection that I have never seen equalled, an affection that would be impossible to describe to this chamber."

Parliament of Australia
Preceded by Jock Garden	Member for Cook; 1937–1955	Succeeded by Jim Cope
