= Division of Cook (1906–1955) =

Former Australian federal electoral division

Coordinates: 34°1′53.16″S 151°9′4.26″E

Cook Australian House of Representatives Division
- Created: 1906
- Abolished: 1955
- Namesake: James Cook

The Division of Cook was an Australian Electoral Division in New South Wales. The division was created in 1906 and abolished in 1955. The division was named for James Cook, who explored the east coast of Australia in 1770. It was located in the inner suburbs of Sydney, taking in the suburbs of Alexandria, Redfern and Surry Hills.

Cook was a safe seat for the Australian Labor Party, but in the 1930s and 1940s it was fiercely contested between Federal Labor and Lang Labor factions of the party.

== Members ==
Image	Member	Party	Term	Notes
	James Catts (1877–1951)	Labor	12 December 1906 – April 1922	Lost seat
	James Catts (1877–1951)	Majority Labor	April 1922 – 16 December 1922	Lost seat
	Edward Riley (1892–1969)	Labor	16 December 1922 – 15 September 1934	Served as Chief Government Whip in the House under Scullin. Lost seat
	Jock Garden (1882–1968)	Labor (NSW)	15 September 1934 – February 1936	Lost preselection and retired
	Jock Garden (1882–1968)	Labor	February 1936 – 21 September 1937	Lost preselection and retired
	Tom Sheehan (1891–1955)	Labor	23 October 1937 – 2 May 1940	Served as Chief Government Whip in the House under Curtin, Forde and Chifley. Died in office
	Tom Sheehan (1891–1955)	Labor (Non-Communist)	2 May 1940 – February 1941	Served as Chief Government Whip in the House under Curtin, Forde and Chifley. Died in office
	Tom Sheehan (1891–1955)	Labor	February 1941 – 26 March 1955	Served as Chief Government Whip in the House under Curtin, Forde and Chifley. Died in office
	Jim Cope (1907–1999)	Labor	21 May 1955 – 10 December 1955	Transferred to the Division of Watson after Cook was abolished in 1955

== See also ==
- Division of Cook
