= Electoral results for the district of Young =

Election results for Young, New South Wales, Australia

Young, an electoral district of the Legislative Assembly in the Australian state of New South Wales, had two incarnations, from 1880 until 1904 and from 1927 until 1981.

| Election | Member | Party | Member | Party |
|---|---|---|---|---|
| 1880 | James Watson | None | William Watson | None |
| 1882 | Gerald Spring | None | James Mackinnon | None |
| 1885 | Gerald Spring | None | William Watson | None |
| 1885 re-count | Gerald Spring | None | James Mackinnon | None |
| 1887 | James Gordon | Free Trade | James Mackinnon | Protectionist |
| 1889 | John Gough | Protectionist | James Mackinnon | Protectionist |
| 1891 | John Gough | Labour | James Mackinnon | Labour |
| 1894 | Chris Watson | Labour | | |
| 1895 | Chris Watson | Labour | | |
| 1898 | Chris Watson | Labour | | |
| 1901 | George Burgess | Labour | | |
| Member | Party | Term | | |
| 1927 | Albert Reid | Country | | |
| 1930 | Clarrie Martin | Labor | | |
| 1932 | Albert Reid | Country | | |
| 1935 | Albert Reid | Country | | |
| 1938 | Albert Reid | Country | | |
| 1941 | Fred Cahill | Labor | | |
| 1944 | Fred Cahill | Labor | | |
| 1947 | Fred Cahill | Labor | | |
| 1950 | Fred Cahill | Labor | | |
| 1953 | Fred Cahill | Labor | | |
| 1956 | Fred Cahill | Labor | | |
| 1959 | George Freudenstein | Country | | |
| 1962 | George Freudenstein | Country | | |
| 1965 | George Freudenstein | Country | | |
| 1968 | George Freudenstein | Country | | |
| 1971 | George Freudenstein | Country | | |
| 1973 | George Freudenstein | Country | | |
| 1976 | George Freudenstein | Country | | |
| 1978 | George Freudenstein | Country | | |

== Election results ==
=== Elections in the 1970s ===
==== 1978 ====
1978 New South Wales state election: Young
| Party | Candidate | Votes | % | ±% |
|---|---|---|---|---|
| National Country | George Freudenstein | 11,625 | 53.0 | −5.4 |
| Labor | Timothy West | 10,287 | 47.0 | +5.4 |
| Total formal votes | | 21,912 | 98.4 | −0.2 |
| Informal votes | | 351 | 1.6 | +0.2 |
| Turnout | | 22,263 | 94.7 | −0.3 |
| National Country hold | | Swing | −5.4 | |

==== 1976 ====
1976 New South Wales state election: Young
| Party | Candidate | Votes | % | ±% |
|---|---|---|---|---|
| Country | George Freudenstein | 12,394 | 58.4 | +1.0 |
| Labor | Timothy West | 8,818 | 41.6 | +2.8 |
| Total formal votes | | 21,212 | 98.6 | −0.6 |
| Informal votes | | 304 | 1.4 | +0.6 |
| Turnout | | 21,516 | 95.0 | 0.0 |
| Country hold | | Swing | −2.0 | |

==== 1973 ====
1973 New South Wales state election: Young
| Party | Candidate | Votes | % | ±% |
|---|---|---|---|---|
| Country | George Freudenstein | 11,671 | 57.4 | +9.0 |
| Labor | Kenneth Gunn | 7,887 | 38.8 | −6.1 |
| Democratic Labor | John Hawkins | 764 | 3.8 | −2.9 |
| Total formal votes | | 20,322 | 99.2 | |
| Informal votes | | 161 | 0.8 | |
| Turnout | | 20,483 | 95.1 | |
Two-party-preferred result
| Country | George Freudenstein | 12,282 | 60.4 | +6.6 |
| Labor | Kenneth Gunn | 8,040 | 39.6 | −6.6 |
| Country hold | | Swing | +6.6 | |

==== 1971 ====
1971 New South Wales state election: Young
| Party | Candidate | Votes | % | ±% |
|---|---|---|---|---|
| Country | George Freudenstein | 9,192 | 48.4 | −10.9 |
| Labor | Jeffrey Condron | 8,527 | 44.9 | +9.6 |
| Democratic Labor | John Hogan | 1,266 | 6.7 | +1.2 |
| Total formal votes | | 18,985 | 98.9 | |
| Informal votes | | 210 | 1.1 | |
| Turnout | | 19,195 | 95.8 | |
Two-party-preferred result
| Country | George Freudenstein | 10,210 | 53.8 | −9.8 |
| Labor | Jeffrey Condron | 8,775 | 46.2 | +9.8 |
| Country hold | | Swing | −9.8 | |

=== Elections in the 1960s ===
==== 1968 ====
1968 New South Wales state election: Young
| Party | Candidate | Votes | % | ±% |
|---|---|---|---|---|
| Country | George Freudenstein | 11,374 | 59.3 | −3.2 |
| Labor | Kevin Whalan | 6,769 | 35.3 | −2.2 |
| Democratic Labor | James Manwaring | 1,045 | 5.4 | +5.4 |
| Total formal votes | | 19,188 | 98.4 | |
| Informal votes | | 305 | 1.6 | |
| Turnout | | 19,493 | 95.6 | |
Two-party-preferred result
| Country | George Freudenstein | 12,210 | 63.6 | +1.1 |
| Labor | Kevin Whalan | 6,978 | 36.4 | −1.1 |
| Country hold | | Swing | +1.1 | |

==== 1965 ====
1965 New South Wales state election: Young
| Party | Candidate | Votes | % | ±% |
|---|---|---|---|---|
| Country | George Freudenstein | 11,987 | 62.5 | +8.9 |
| Labor | Robert Rygate | 7,192 | 37.5 | −4.3 |
| Total formal votes | | 19,179 | 99.1 | −0.1 |
| Informal votes | | 167 | 0.9 | +0.1 |
| Turnout | | 19,346 | 95.8 | −0.1 |
| Country hold | | Swing | +5.2 | |

==== 1962 ====
1962 New South Wales state election: Young
| Party | Candidate | Votes | % | ±% |
|---|---|---|---|---|
| Country | George Freudenstein | 9,991 | 53.6 | +19.1 |
| Labor | Peter Kelly | 7,800 | 41.8 | +2.9 |
| Democratic Labor | Ronald Silk | 862 | 4.6 | +0.6 |
| Total formal votes | | 18,653 | 99.2 | |
| Informal votes | | 150 | 0.8 | |
| Turnout | | 18,803 | 95.9 | |
Two-party-preferred result
| Country | George Freudenstein | 10,681 | 57.3 | −1.0 |
| Labor | Peter Kelly | 7,972 | 42.7 | +1.0 |
| Country hold | | Swing | +1.0 | |

=== Elections in the 1950s ===
==== 1959 ====
1959 New South Wales state election: Young
| Party | Candidate | Votes | % | ±% |
|---|---|---|---|---|
| Labor | Ernest McDermott | 7,322 | 38.9 | |
| Country | George Freudenstein | 6,495 | 34.5 | |
| Liberal | Raymond Oliver | 4,245 | 22.6 | |
| Democratic Labor | John Hogan | 743 | 4.0 | |
| Total formal votes | | 18,805 | 99.0 | |
| Informal votes | | 195 | 1.0 | |
| Turnout | | 19,000 | 95.4 | |
Two-party-preferred result
| Country | George Freudenstein | 10,967 | 58.3 | |
| Labor | Ernest McDermott | 7,838 | 41.7 | |
| Country gain from Labor | | Swing | | |

==== 1956 ====
1956 New South Wales state election: Young
| Party | Candidate | Votes | % | ±% |
|---|---|---|---|---|
| Labor | Fred Cahill | 9,371 | 49.0 | −8.2 |
| Liberal | Raymond Oliver | 4,904 | 25.6 | +25.6 |
| Country | George Freudenstein | 4,858 | 25.4 | −17.4 |
| Total formal votes | | 19,133 | 99.2 | +0.1 |
| Informal votes | | 151 | 0.8 | −0.1 |
| Turnout | | 19,284 | 95.1 | −0.5 |
Two-party-preferred result
| Labor | Fred Cahill | 9,746 | 50.9 | −6.3 |
| Liberal | Raymond Oliver | 9,387 | 49.1 | +6.3 |
| Labor hold | | Swing | −6.3 | |

==== 1953 ====
1953 New South Wales state election: Young
| Party | Candidate | Votes | % | ±% |
|---|---|---|---|---|
| Labor | Fred Cahill | 10,802 | 57.2 | |
| Country | Reg Hailstone | 8,086 | 42.8 | |
| Total formal votes | | 18,888 | 99.1 | |
| Informal votes | | 161 | 0.9 | |
| Turnout | | 19,049 | 95.6 | |

==== 1950 ====
1950 New South Wales state election: Young
| Party | Candidate | Votes | % | ±% |
|---|---|---|---|---|
| Labor | Fred Cahill | 9,568 | 51.4 | |
| Country | Douglas Beard | 5,282 | 28.4 | |
| Liberal | Percy Richardson | 3,761 | 20.2 | |
| Total formal votes | | 18,611 | 99.3 | |
| Informal votes | | 135 | 0.7 | |
| Turnout | | 18,746 | 94.6 | |
Two-party-preferred result
| Labor | Fred Cahill | | 53.0 | |
| Country | Douglas Beard | | 47.0 | |
| Labor hold | | Swing | | |

=== Elections in the 1940s ===
==== 1947 ====
1947 New South Wales state election: Young
| Party | Candidate | Votes | % | ±% |
|---|---|---|---|---|
| Labor | Fred Cahill | 7,648 | 52.7 | −5.4 |
| Liberal | Percy Richardson | 3,936 | 27.1 | +27.1 |
| Country | John Collins | 2,937 | 20.2 | |
| Total formal votes | | 14,521 | 99.3 | +0.9 |
| Informal votes | | 103 | 0.7 | −0.9 |
| Turnout | | 14,624 | 96.1 | +5.1 |
| Labor hold | | Swing | N/A | |

==== 1944 ====
1944 New South Wales state election: Young
| Party | Candidate | Votes | % | ±% |
|---|---|---|---|---|
| Labor | Fred Cahill | 7,758 | 58.1 | +25.9 |
| Country | Valentine Bragg | 5,607 | 41.9 | −4.3 |
| Total formal votes | | 13,365 | 98.4 | −0.9 |
| Informal votes | | 210 | 1.6 | +0.9 |
| Turnout | | 13,575 | 91.0 | −3.7 |
| Labor hold | | Swing | +5.8 | |

==== 1941 ====
1941 New South Wales state election: Young
| Party | Candidate | Votes | % | ±% |
|---|---|---|---|---|
| Country | Albert Reid | 6,561 | 46.2 | |
| Labor | Fred Cahill | 4,579 | 32.2 | |
| Independent Labor | Stanley Neagle | 3,062 | 21.6 | |
| Total formal votes | | 14,202 | 99.3 | |
| Informal votes | | 97 | 0.7 | |
| Turnout | | 14,299 | 94.4 | |
Two-party-preferred result
| Labor | Fred Cahill | 7,431 | 52.3 | |
| Country | Albert Reid | 6,772 | 47.7 | |
| Labor gain from Country | | Swing | | |

=== Elections in the 1930s ===
==== 1938 ====
1938 New South Wales state election: Young
| Party | Candidate | Votes | % | ±% |
|---|---|---|---|---|
| Country | Albert Reid | 7,522 | 53.9 | +0.2 |
| Labor | Reginald Phillips | 6,435 | 46.1 | −0.2 |
| Total formal votes | | 13,957 | 99.0 | +0.3 |
| Informal votes | | 145 | 1.0 | −0.3 |
| Turnout | | 14,102 | 97.3 | +0.7 |
| Country hold | | Swing | +0.2 | |

==== 1935 ====
1935 New South Wales state election: Young
| Party | Candidate | Votes | % | ±% |
|---|---|---|---|---|
| Country | Albert Reid | 7,480 | 53.7 | +5.0 |
| Labor (NSW) | Stanley Neagle | 6,460 | 46.3 | +6.2 |
| Total formal votes | | 13,940 | 98.7 | +0.2 |
| Informal votes | | 190 | 1.3 | −0.2 |
| Turnout | | 14,130 | 96.6 | −0.2 |
| Country hold | | Swing | −5.5 | |

==== 1932 ====
1932 New South Wales state election: Young
| Party | Candidate | Votes | % | ±% |
|---|---|---|---|---|
| Country | Albert Reid | 6,391 | 48.7 | +9.7 |
| Labor (NSW) | Clarrie Martin | 5,258 | 40.1 | −6.5 |
| Country | Mark Whitby | 1,467 | 11.2 | +11.2 |
| Total formal votes | | 13,116 | 98.5 | −0.2 |
| Informal votes | | 193 | 1.5 | +0.2 |
| Turnout | | 13,309 | 96.8 | +1.2 |
Two-party-preferred result
| Country | Albert Reid | 7,762 | 59.2 | +12.4 |
| Labor (NSW) | Clarrie Martin | 5,354 | 40.8 | −12.4 |
| Country gain from Labor (NSW) | | Swing | +12.4 | |

==== 1930 ====
1930 New South Wales state election: Young
| Party | Candidate | Votes | % | ±% |
|---|---|---|---|---|
| Labor | Clarrie Martin | 6,026 | 46.6 | |
| Country | Albert Reid (defeated) | 5,040 | 39.0 | |
| Independent | Peter Loughlin | 1,858 | 14.4 | |
| Total formal votes | | 12,924 | 98.7 | |
| Informal votes | | 170 | 1.3 | |
| Turnout | | 13,094 | 95.6 | |
Two-party-preferred result
| Labor | Clarrie Martin | 6,869 | 53.2 | |
| Country | Albert Reid | 6,055 | 46.8 | |
| Labor gain from Country | | Swing | | |

=== Elections in the 1920s ===
==== 1927 ====
1927 New South Wales state election: Young
| Party | Candidate | Votes | % | ±% |
|---|---|---|---|---|
| Country | Albert Reid | 4,349 | 35.2 | |
| Independent Labor | Peter Loughlin (defeated) | 4,082 | 33.0 | |
| Labor | George McCarthy | 3,932 | 31.8 | |
| Total formal votes | | 12,363 | 99.2 | |
| Informal votes | | 104 | 0.8 | |
| Turnout | | 12,467 | 84.3 | |
Two-candidate-preferred result
| Country | Albert Reid | 4,603 | 50.3 | |
| Independent Labor | Peter Loughlin | 4,542 | 49.7 | |
| Country win | | (new seat) | | |

District recreated

==== 1920 - 1927 ====
District abolished

=== Elections in the 1900s ===
==== 1901 ====
1901 New South Wales state election: Young
| Party | Candidate | Votes | % | ±% |
|---|---|---|---|---|
| Labour | George Burgess | 833 | 39.4 | −19.3 |
| Independent | Alphonso Tewksbury | 614 | 29.1 | |
| Independent | Thomas Spring | 348 | 16.5 | |
| Independent | John Lynch | 269 | 12.7 | |
| Liberal Reform | James Rankin | 49 | 2.3 | |
| Total formal votes | | 2,113 | 100.0 | +0.8 |
| Informal votes | | 0 | 0.0 | −0.8 |
| Turnout | | 2,113 | 70.1 | −2.3 |
| Labour hold | | | | |

The sitting member was Chris Watson (Labour) who did not contest the election as he had been elected in March 1901 to the federal seat of Bland.

=== Elections in the 1890s ===
==== 1898 ====
1898 New South Wales colonial election: Young
| Party | Candidate | Votes | % | ±% |
|---|---|---|---|---|
| Labour | Chris Watson | 1,244 | 58.7 | |
| National Federal | Richard O'Connor | 876 | 41.3 | |
| Total formal votes | | 2,120 | 99.2 | |
| Informal votes | | 18 | 0.8 | |
| Turnout | | 2,138 | 72.4 | |
| Labour hold | | | | |

==== 1895 ====
1895 New South Wales colonial election: Young
| Party | Candidate | Votes | % | ±% |
|---|---|---|---|---|
| Labour | Chris Watson | 900 | 57.8 | |
| Protectionist | John Forsythe | 656 | 42.2 | |
| Total formal votes | | 1,556 | 99.2 | |
| Informal votes | | 12 | 0.8 | |
| Turnout | | 1,568 | 68.7 | |
| Labour hold | | | | |

==== 1894 ====
1894 New South Wales colonial election: Young
| Party | Candidate | Votes | % | ±% |
|---|---|---|---|---|
| Labour | Chris Watson | 703 | 44.6 | |
| Protectionist | John Gough (defeated) | 401 | 25.4 | |
| Protectionist | James Mackinnon (defeated) | 400 | 25.4 | |
| Ind. Free Trade | William Lewis | 74 | 4.7 | |
| Total formal votes | | 1,578 | 98.6 | |
| Informal votes | | 23 | 1.4 | |
| Turnout | | 1,601 | 68.8 | |
| Labour hold | | (previously 2 members) | | |

Both John Gough and James Mackinnon had been elected as Labour candidates, however they refused to sign the pledge.

==== 1891 ====
1891 New South Wales colonial election: Young Saturday 27 June
| Party | Candidate | Votes | % | ±% |
|---|---|---|---|---|
| Labour | James Mackinnon (re-elected 1) | 1,394 | 32.6 | |
| Labour | John Gough (re-elected 2) | 1,319 | 30.9 | |
| Free Trade | James Gordon | 903 | 21.1 | |
| Free Trade | William Lucas | 657 | 15.4 | |
| Total formal votes | | 4,273 | 98.9 | |
| Informal votes | | 48 | 1.1 | |
| Turnout | | 2,296 | 72.0 | |
| 2 Members changed to Labour from Protectionist | | | | |

=== Elections in the 1880s ===
==== 1889 ====
1889 New South Wales colonial election: Young Saturday 9 February
| Party | Candidate | Votes | % | ±% |
|---|---|---|---|---|
| Protectionist | John Gough (elected 1) | 931 | 24.8 | |
| Protectionist | James Mackinnon (elected 2) | 917 | 24.5 | |
| Free Trade | James Gordon | 902 | 24.1 | |
| Free Trade | William Lucas | 512 | 13.7 | |
| Protectionist | John Miller | 487 | 13.0 | |
| Total formal votes | | 3,749 | 98.9 | |
| Informal votes | | 40 | 1.1 | |
| Turnout | | 2,287 | 69.5 | |
| Protectionist win 1 and gain 1 from Free Trade | | | | |

==== 1887 ====
1887 New South Wales colonial election: Young Saturday 19 February
| Party | Candidate | Votes | % | ±% |
|---|---|---|---|---|
| Free Trade | James Gordon (elected 1) | 1,095 | 30.7 | |
| Protectionist | James Mackinnon (re-elected 2) | 1,053 | 29.5 | |
| Protectionist | Gerald Spring (defeated) | 922 | 25.8 | |
| Free Trade | William Lucas | 498 | 14.0 | |
| Total formal votes | | 3,568 | 99.3 | |
| Informal votes | | 24 | 0.7 | |
| Turnout | | 2,206 | 64.4 | |

==== 1885 re-count ====
1885 Young election re-count Tuesday 22 December
| Candidate | Votes | % |
|---|---|---|
| Gerald Spring (re-elected 1) | 1,271 | 38.6 |
| James Mackinnon (elected 2) | 1,036 | 30.7 |
| William Watson (defeated) | 988 | 30.7 |
| Total formal votes | 3,295 | |
| Informal votes | | |
| Turnout | 3,295 | 47.0 |

The Elections and Qualifications Committee overturned the 1885 general election for Young.

==== 1885 ====
1885 New South Wales colonial election: Young Thursday 22 October
| Candidate | Votes | % |
|---|---|---|
| Gerald Spring (re-elected 1) | 1,270 | 38.6 |
| William Watson (elected 2) | 1,011 | 30.7 |
| James Mackinnon (defeated) | 1,009 | 30.7 |
| Total formal votes | 3,290 | 100.0 |
| Informal votes | 0 | 0.0 |
| Turnout | 3,290 | 47.0 |

==== 1882 ====
1882 New South Wales colonial election: Young Monday 4 December
| Candidate | Votes | % |
|---|---|---|
| Gerald Spring (elected 1) | 1,097 | 40.7 |
| James Mackinnon (elected 2) | 799 | 29.7 |
| James Watson (defeated) | 797 | 29.6 |
| Total formal votes | 2,693 | 98.2 |
| Informal votes | 50 | 1.8 |
| Turnout | 2,743 | 39.7 |

James Watson was subsequently unsuccessful in contesting Illawarra.

==== 1880 ====
1880 New South Wales colonial election: Young Monday 22 November
| Candidate | Votes | % |
|---|---|---|
| James Watson (re-elected 1) | 968 | 30.3 |
| William Watson (elected 2) | 841 | 26.4 |
| John Heaton | 726 | 22.8 |
| Patrick Crowe | 656 | 20.6 |
| Total formal votes | 3,191 | 98.6 |
| Informal votes | 44 | 1.4 |
| Turnout | 1,644 | 53.9 |
| | (new seat) | |
