= 1885 Young colonial election re-count =

By-election in New South Wales, Australia

In December 1885 the Elections and Qualifications Committee overturned the 1885 general election for Young, in which Gerald Spring and William Watson had been declared elected, with William Watson having a margin of 2 votes over James Mackinnon.

The petition made 2 main complaints (1) the returning officer at Bendick Murrell had marked the ballot papers with the electoral number of the voter, allowing anyone to ascertain how each elector had voted and (2) votes for Mackinnon were improperly rejected as informal. The members of the committee were Robert Smith (Chairman), John Burns, Henry Clarke, John Purves, George Reid, Septimus Stephen and John Sutherland.

The Elections and Qualifications Committee declared that William Watson had not been elected the member for Young, however no by-election was conducted. Instead the committee declared that James Mackinnon had been elected with a margin of 48 votes. No reasons were published.

== Dates ==
Date	Event
22 October 1885	General election for Young
30 November 1885	Petition lodged by James Mackinnon.
1 December 1885	Petition referred to the Elections and Qualifications Committee.
22 December 1885	Elections and Qualifications Committee declared that James Mackinnon had been elected.

== Result ==
1885 Young election re-count Tuesday 22 December
Candidate	Votes	%
Gerald Spring (re-elected 1)	1,271	38.6
James Mackinnon (elected 2)	1,036	30.7
William Watson (defeated)	988	30.7
Total formal votes	3,295	
Informal votes		
Turnout	3,295	47.0

== See also ==
- Electoral results for the district of Young
- List of New South Wales state by-elections
