= Electoral results for the Division of Bland =

Australian division election results

This is a list of electoral results for the Division of Bland in Australian federal elections from the division's creation in 1901 until its abolition in 1906.

== Members ==
Member	Party	Term
Chris Watson	Labour	1901—1906

== Election results ==
=== Elections in the 1900s ===
==== 1903 ====
1903 Australian federal election: Bland
Party	Candidate	Votes	%	±%
Labour	Chris Watson	4,779	55.4	−2.0
Free Trade	John Longmuir	3,854	44.6	+33.6
Total formal votes		8,633	96.4	
Informal votes		327	3.6	
Turnout		8,960	43.0	
Labour hold		Swing	−7.5	

==== 1901 ====
1901 Australian federal election: Bland
Party	Candidate	Votes	%	±%
Labour	Chris Watson	4,132	57.4	+57.4
Ind. Protectionist	Patrick Heffernan	2,271	31.6	+31.6
Free Trade	William Lucas	792	11.0	+11.0
Total formal votes		7,195	97.6	
Informal votes		175	2.4	
Turnout		7,370	67.0	
Labour win		(new seat)		
