= List of Judson Dance Theater performers =

Judson Dance Theater was an informal group of dancers who performed at the Judson Memorial Church in Greenwich Village, Manhattan New York City between 1962 and 1964. It grew out of a dance composition class taught by Robert Dunn, a musician who had studied with John Cage. The artists involved were avant garde experimentalists who rejected the confines of Modern dance practice and theory, inventing as they did the precepts of Postmodern dance.

The first Judson concert took place on July 6, 1962.

This is a list of all artists (dance artists, musicians, visual arts) who were a part of the Judson Dance Theater between 1962 and 1966:

== A ==
- Carolyn Adams
- Charles Adams
- Felix Aeppli
- Seth Allen
- Susie Allen
- Toby Armour
- Becky Arnold
- Styra Avins

== B ==
- Joan Baker
- Ansel Baldonado
- Jerri Banks
- George Bartenieff
- Edward Barton
- Margaret Beals
- Judith Berkowitz
- Lori Berkowitz
- Sind Bhairavi
- Erica Bindler
- John Blair
- Carla Blank
- Joseph Bloom
- Robert Blossom
- Edward V. Boagni
- Sudie Bond
- Sally Bowden
- George Brecht
- Carolyn Brown
- Leroy Bowser
- Pearl Bowser
- Bonnie Bremer
- Edward Brewer
- Ronald Brown
- Trisha Brown
- Joseph Byrd

== C ==
- Lucy Carmalt
- Al Carmines
- Christopher Carrick
- Janet Castle
- Diana or Diane Cernovich
- Peter Chapman
- Mark Chapnick
- Remy Charlip
- Lucinda Childs
- Carolyn Chrisman
- Nancy Christofferson
- Sheila Cohen
- Hunt Cole
- Richard Colten
- Chuck Connor
- Michael Corner
- Philip Corner
- Terry Creach
- Tina Croll
- Gretel Cummings

== D ==
- Bill Davis
- Laura Dean
- Laura de Freitas
- Cecily Dell
- Walter De Maria
- Nanette Deminges
- George Dennison
- Pamela Denver
- Brian de Palma
- Ken Dewey
- Harry Diakoff
- Barbara Dilley
- Diane di Palma
- Bill Dixon
- Kathy Dobkin
- Johnny Dodd
- Pamela Dover
- John Dowd
- Rachel Drexler
- Jeff Duncan
- Judith Dunn
- Robert Dunn

== E ==
- Carol Ehrlick
- June Ekman
- Larrio Ekson
- Maurice Elanc
- Michael Elias
- Frank Emerson
- Ruth Emerson
- Beverly Emmons
- Ed Emshwiller
- Joe Evans
- Jose Evans
- Abigail Ewert

== F ==
- Joan Fairlie
- Viola Farber
- Lulu Farnsworth
- Crystal Field
- William Fields
- June Finch
- Jim Finney
- Pamela Finney
- George Flynn
- Maria Irene Fornés y Collado
- Barbara Forst
- Simone Forti
- Hollis Frampton
- Eugene Friedman
- Robert Frink
- Cynthia Full

== G ==
- Mark Gabor
- Tom Garland
- Trudy Gertler
- Rhona Ginn
- Richard Goldberg
- Malcolm Goldstein
- Grace Goodman
- Mickey Goodman
- James Goodson
- David Gordon
- Esther Gouldin
- Frank Grady
- Marty Greenbaum
- Joe Greenstein
- Red Grooms
- Gary Gross
- Mimi Gross
- Sally Gross
- Mark Guache
- Lee Guilliatt

== H ==
- Clinton Hamilton
- Suzushi Hanayagi
- Al Hansen
- Fred Harris
- Johnny Harris
- Walter Harris
- Mimi Hartshorn
- Deborah Hay
- Alex Hay
- Wendy Heckler
- Cynthia Hedstrom
- E. Hendrick
- Geoffrey Hendricks
- Jon Hendricks
- Donna Hepler
- Fred Herko
- Clyde Herlitz
- George Herms
- Geoffrey Heyworth
- Dick Higgins
- Irv Hochberg
- Tony Holder
- Dorothy Hoppe
- John Hoppe
- Jerry Howard
- Ka Kwong Hui
- Robert Huot
- Scott Hutton

== I ==
- Yasuo Ihara
- Ed Iverson

== J ==
- Mari Jackman
- Daniel Jahn
- Alex John
- Eddie Johnson
- Harold Johnson
- Karen Johnson
- Ray Johnson
- Jill Johnston
- Joe Jones
- LeRoi Jones
- Jerry Joyner
- Julie Judd

== K ==
- Michael Katz
- Susan Kaufman
- Isamu Kawai
- Masato Kawasaki
- Elizabeth Keen
- Barbara Kendall
- Elmira Kendricks
- Ustad Ali Akbar Khan
- B. King
- Kenneth King
- Teresa King
- Barbara Kleinberg
- Billy Klüver
- Olga Adorno Klüver
- Shielah Komer
- Lawrence Kornfeld
- Takehisa Kosugi
- Judith Kummerle
- Al Kurchin
- Julie Kurnitz
- Marcia Jean Kurtz

== L ==
- Toni Lacativa
- Pandit Chatur Lal
- Eliza Lamb
- Stephen Lamb
- Arthur Layser
- David Lee
- Deborah Lee
- Ro Lee
- Ellen Levene
- Suzanne Levine
- Ira Lieberman
- Frank Lilly
- Eugene Lion
- Victor Lipari
- Carol Lipis
- Katherine Litz
- Barbara Lloyd
- Benjamin Lloyd
- Clare Lorenzi

== M ==
- Martha McCauley
- John Herbert McDowell
- Gretchen MacLane
- Jackson Mac Low
- Michael Malcé
- Claire Mallardi
- Castro March
- Carol Marcy
- Norma Marder
- Allen Marlowe
- Elizabeth Martin
- Paula Mason
- Jack Matlaga
- Ira Matteson
- Richard Maxfield
- Taylor Mead
- Irene Meltzer
- Annette Mendel
- Ellen Messing
- William Meyer
- Christine Meyers
- Otto Mjaanes
- Meredith Monk
- Thelonious Monk
- Peter Moore
- Charlotte Moorman
- Robert Morris
- Roger Morris
- Dorothy Moskowitz
- Elizabeth Munro
- Bill Myers

== N ==
- Billy Name (William Linich)
- Sandra Neels
- Novella Nelson
- Max Neuhaus
- Phoebe Neville
- Peter Nevraumont
- Phil Niblock
- Sabina Nordoff

== O ==
- Alex Ogle
- Frank O'Hara
- Edward Oleksak
- Olen Orr
- Michael Orrell

== P ==
- Sandy Padilla
- William Pardue
- Aileen Passloff
- John Patton
- Steve Paxton
- Andrew Peck
- Richard Peppitone
- Nina Petrucelli
- Rudy Perez
- Katherine Pira
- Lauren Persichetti
- John Porche
- Lanny Powers
- Neville Powers

== Q ==
- John Quinn

== R ==
- Yvonne Rainer
- Ellen Rand
- Robert Ranieri
- Jerome Raphel
- Elna Rapp
- C. Rauschenberg
- Robert Rauschenberg
- Eric Regener
- Gregory Reeve
- Albert Reid
- Diana Reil
- Lucy Reisman
- Joshua Rifkin
- Dorothea Rockburn
- Richard Robbins
- Lou Rogers
- Charles Ross
- Arlene Rothlein
- Charles Rotmil
- Sheila Roy
- Arnlene Rubawsky

== S ==
- Mark Saegers
- Mark Saffron
- Barbara Salthe
- Stan Salthe
- Marian Sarach
- Kenneth Sarch
- M. Sarakhova
- Peter Saul
- David Schiller
- Joseph Schlichter
- Beverly Schmidt
- Carolee Schneemann
- Evelyn Schneider
- Carol Scothorn
- Larry Segal or Siegal
- Valda Setterfield
- Andrew Sherwood
- Linda Sidon
- Bob Sievert
- Nanette Sievert
- James Simpson
- David Skelnik
- Jack Smith
- Michael Smith
- Sue Smith
- Gil Solomon
- SNCC
- Burt Spilk
- Malcolm Spooner
- Sally Stackhouse
- Bob Stanford
- Charles Stanley
- Polly Stearns
- Ruth Sternfeld
- Regina Stroff
- Constance Sullivan
- Carol Summers
- Elaine Summers
- K. Summers
- Burton Supree

== T ==
- Linda Talbot
- Florence Tarlow
- Cecil Taylor
- James Tenney
- Jennifer Tipton
- Robin Toast
- Sheindi Tokayer
- Anne Tolbert
- Roy E. Towl

== U ==
- Per Olof Ultvedt

== V ==
- Johanna Vanderbeek
- Stan Vanderbeek
- Jack Van Osten
- Kenneth Van Sickle
- Steve Vasey
- Fred Vassi
- David Vaughan
- Jean Venable
- Charlotte Victoria
- Joanna Vischer
- Laura Vogel

== W ==
- Marlene Wallin
- James Waring
- Glen Wayne
- Theodore Weichers
- Zena Weiss
- David Whitney
- Arthur Williams
- M. Williams
- Judith Wills
- James Wilson
- Shirley Winston
- Margaret Wise
- Philip Wofford
- Marilyn Wood
- John Worden
- John Wright
- Margaret Wright
- Vincent Wright
- Michael Wylie

== Z ==
- Jamil Zakkai
- Daniel Zellman
- Paul Zimet
