= Eyton =

Eyton may refer to:

- Eyton, Herefordshire, a civil parish in Herefordshire, England
- Eyton on Severn, a village in Shropshire, England
- Eyton upon the Weald Moors, a civil parish in Shropshire, England
- Eyton (surname)
