= Ragdale Hall =

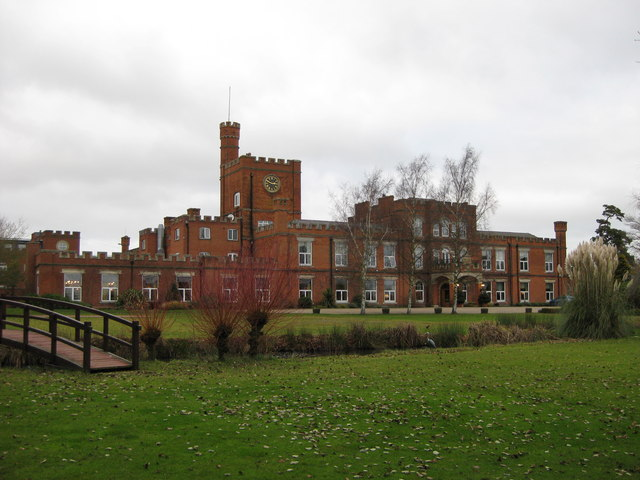

- Location within Leicestershire

General information
- Type: Historic house
- Location: Ragdale, Leicestershire, England
- Coordinates: 52°46′32″N 1°1′50″W

Ragdale Hall is a large hall in the Melton district of Leicestershire, England.

== History ==
The original hall was built in 1785 in the late Georgian period by Robert Shirley, 6th Earl Ferrers, and was made of timber. It was destroyed by fire (date unknown). At that time it was known as Rakedale Hall.

It was re-built in redbrick and became known as Ragdale New Hall. It was built for hunting, which became fox hunting. It was purchased in 1908 from the Earl Ferrers Estate by Albert Cantrell-Hubbersty. In the early 20th century, it was owned by the Cantrell-Hubbersty family. Philip Cantrell-Hubbersty was the Master of the Quorn Hunt. He had no children and his widow sold the hall in 1955.

The late 1950s represented the last private ownership when Mr Charles Keightley acted spontaneously in 1956 and moved onto the estate as the first stage of his purchase of Ragdale Hall. He established himself as a gentleman farmer at Ragdale Hall but it wasn't until February 1958 that the final conveyancing transferred full ownership from Phyllis Cantrell-Hubbersty to himself and his wife, Olga. The Keightley's moved their family of five children from Burton Hall. Some time after 1959 it was bought by a Leicester industrialist by the name of Benton, who operated it as a country club, with a sideline of illegal gambling. Undesirable characters, such as the Kray Twins, started showing up, which may have contributed to a hurried sale in 1963.

In 1968/1969 Ragdale Hall Country Club as purchased by Dimitrios Kaouklis (known locally as 'Jim'). He was a Greek Cypriot who had joined the Cyprus Regiment in the early part of WWII and had fought in Palestine and Later on in Italy, where he saw action at Monte Casino. At the end of the war he met and married an Italian girl. In 1949 he, his wife and new born son migrated to England. Dimitrios Kaouklis commenced renovating the hall; rebuilding the old wing and adding 13 bedrooms as well as a conference room and modern kitchen. After a near drowning the partial moat was filled in. He became financially over-extended and sold the hall in 1973.

It was purchased by Slimming Magazine's Audrey Eyton of the F-plan diet, who turned it into Ragdale Hall Health Hydro. It offers a destination spa. In June 1990 it was bought by two of the founders of Our Price Records (which itself was bought in 2004), who still own it today. In 2007 a thermal spa was opened.

== Geography ==
The hall is east of the Six Hills junction of the A46 dual carriageway (Fosse Way) with the B676 in the parish of Hoby with Rotherby. It is east of the Charnwood borough boundary.

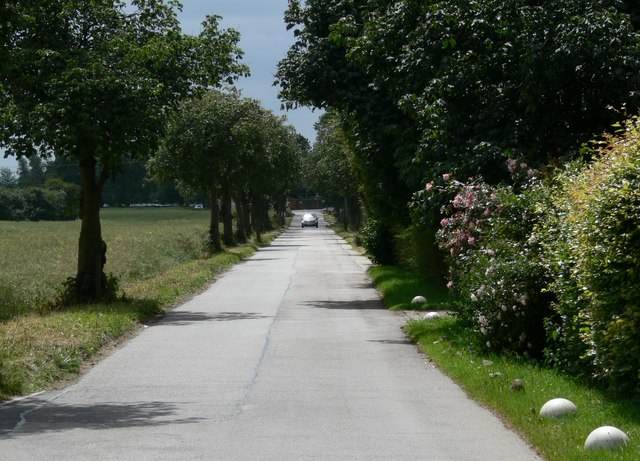
Entrance to the Hall

== See also ==
- List of country houses in the United Kingdom
