= 1907 Australian Labor Party leadership election =

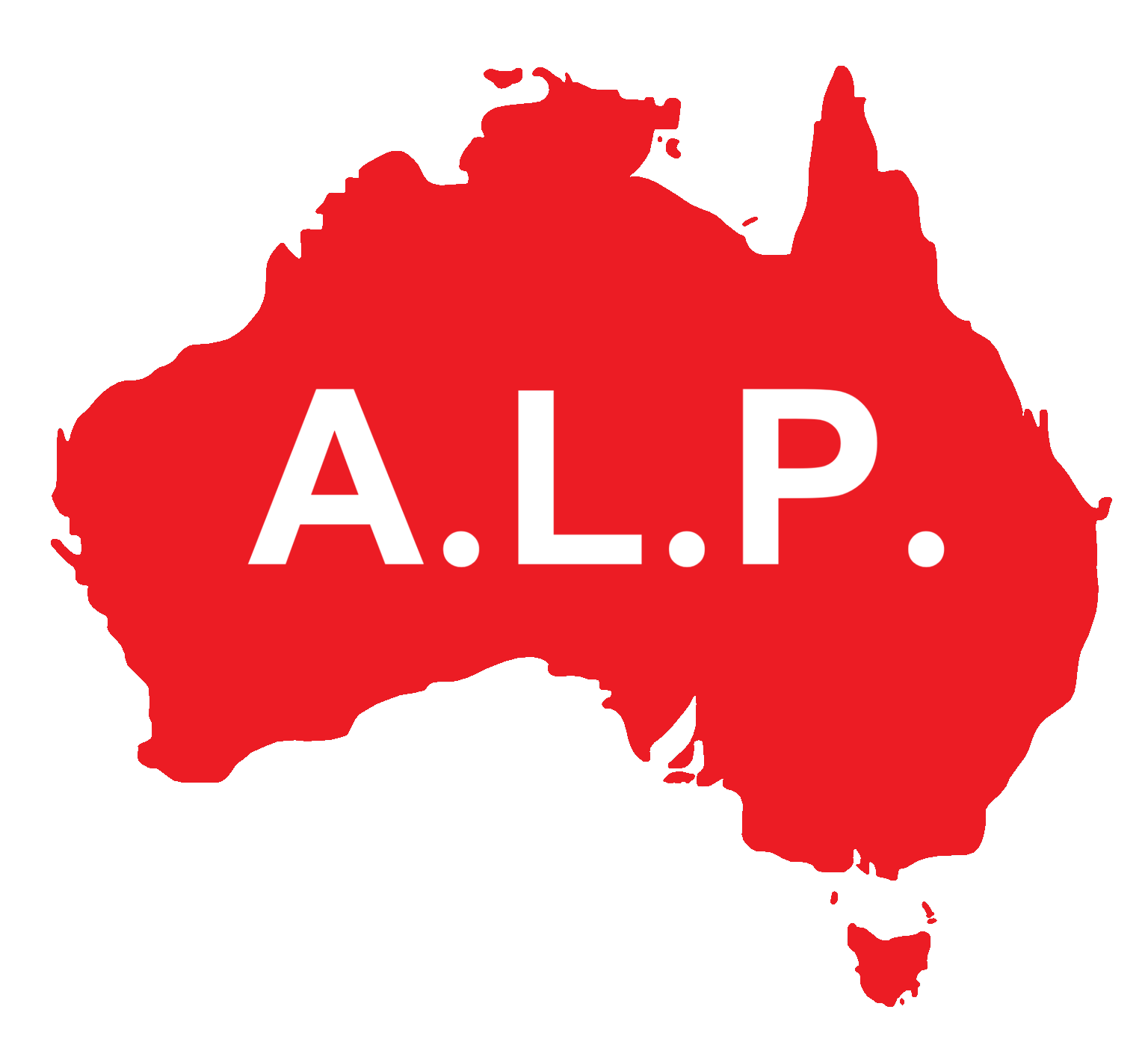
- 30 October 1907
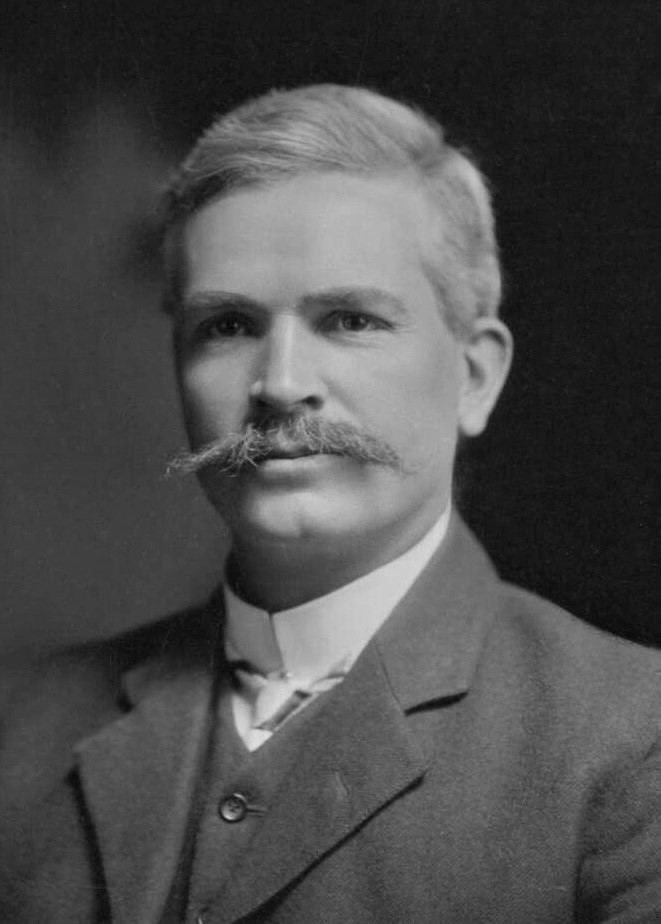

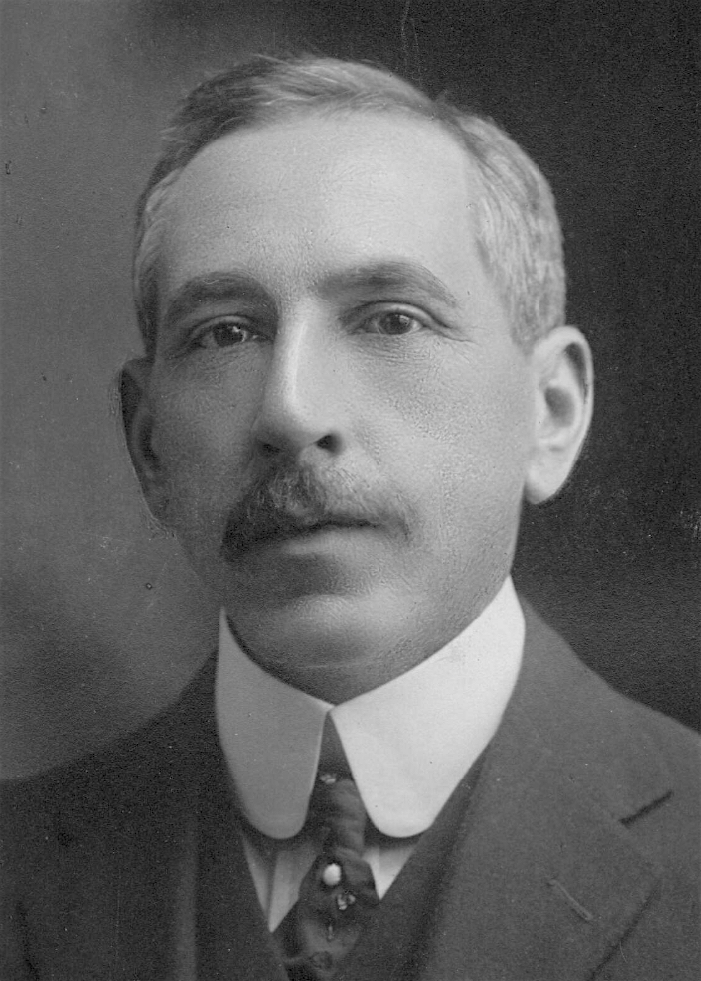

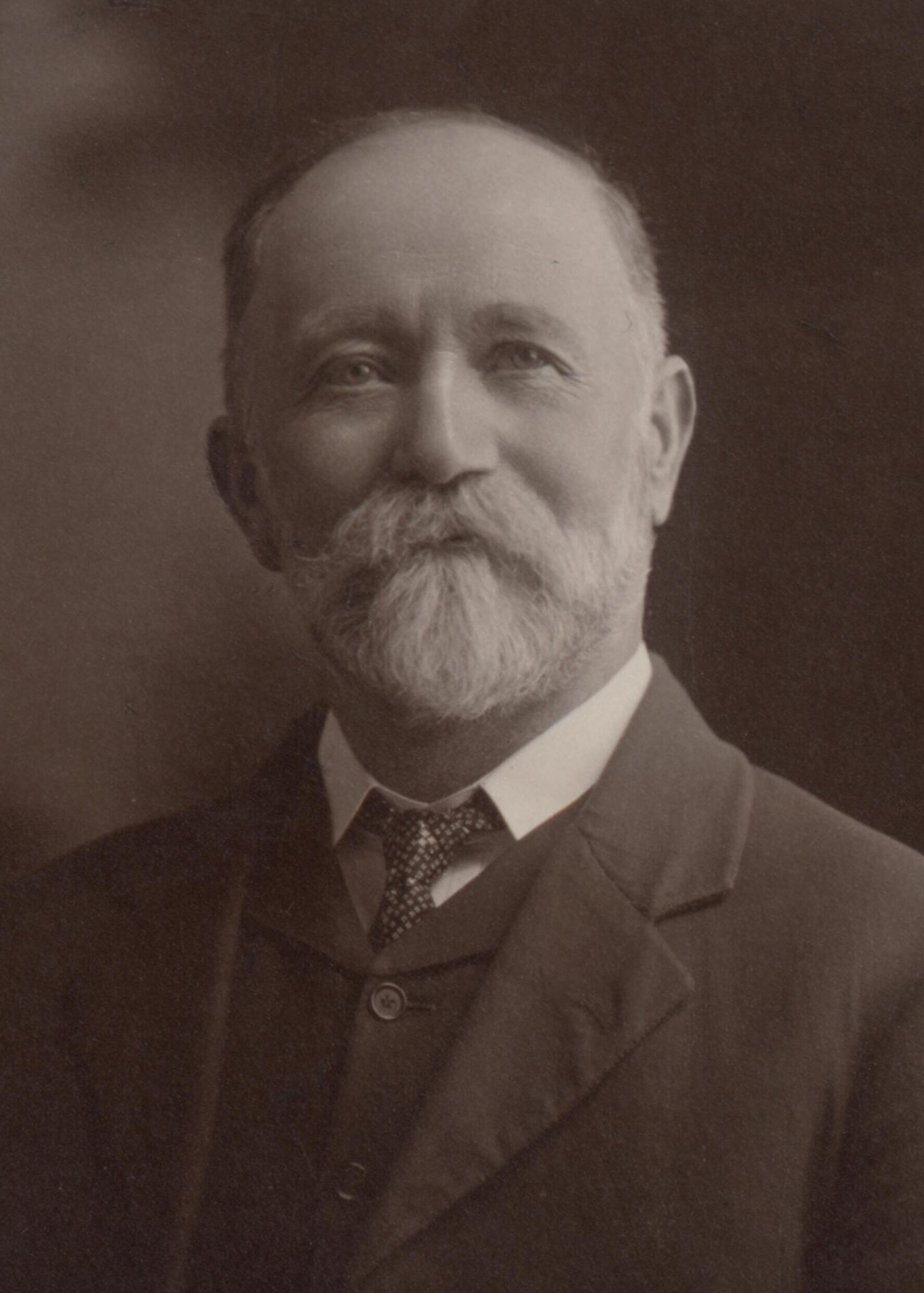
Candidate	Andrew Fisher	Billy Hughes	William Spence
First Ballot	Unknown	Unknown	Unknown
Second Ballot	Majority	Minority	Eliminated
Third Ballot	Unopposed	Withdrew	Eliminated
Leader before election
Chris Watson
Elected Leader
Andrew Fisher

The Australian Labor Party held a leadership election on 30 October 1907, following the resignation of Chris Watson. The party elected Andrew Fisher as its new leader, ahead of three other candidates.

== Background ==
Watson had been chosen as the party's inaugural leader in 1901, and led Labor to the 1903 and 1906 federal elections. He announced his intention to resign the leadership on 24 October 1907, which was attributed to his "physical and mental fatigue, together with his wife's ill health and her objections to his frequent absences from home". Financial considerations may have also played a part. There was little appetite within the party for a change in leadership, and some of his colleagues tried to convince him to stay on as leader.

The Labor caucus met at Parliament House, Melbourne, on 30 October to elect a new leader. Four candidates were nominated – Andrew Fisher, Billy Hughes, William Spence, and Lee Batchelor. All except Spence had served in cabinet during the 1904 Watson Ministry, the Labor Party's only previous federal experience in government. Batchelor withdrew before the first ballot, which saw Spence eliminated. Fisher then won a majority on the second ballot. Hughes proposed that a third ballot be held so that Fisher could be elected unopposed. This result was what was reported to the press, and the fact that there had been other candidates was not revealed until a number of years later.
