= Eyton (surname) =

Eyton is a surname. Notable people with the surname include:

- Audrey Eyton, animal welfare campaigner and author of The F-Plan Diet
- Bessie Eyton (1890–1965), American actress
- Charles Eyton (1871–1941), actor and producer
- Frank Eyton (1894–1962), English lyricist
- John Eyton, Welsh politician in the 17th century
- Kenrick Eyton (1607–1681), Welsh lawyer and politician
- Robert William Eyton (1815–1881), English antiquarian
- Stephen Eyton (14th century), English chronicler
- Thomas Eyton (politician) (c1682–1757), English landowner and politician
- Thomas Eyton (c1843–1925), New Zealand public servant and soldier
- Thomas Campbell Eyton (1809–1880), English naturalist
- Trevor Eyton (1934–2019), Canadian businessman and Senator
