= George Freudenstein =

Australian politician

George Francis Freudenstein (26 December 1921 – 22 October 2007) was an Australian politician. He was a Country Party member of the New South Wales Legislative Assembly from 1959 to 1981, representing the electorate of Young. He served variously as Minister for Cultural Activities, Minister for Conservation, and Minister for Mines and Energy in the Askin Coalition government.

Freudenstein was born in Young, and was educated at Warrunga Primary School and Grenfell High School. He worked as a bank clerk with the Rural Bank in Sydney after leaving school, but enlisted in the military during World War II, seeing active service in Papua New Guinea from 1942 to 1946. He returned to his family property, Chippendale, after the war, where he farmed and bred cattle. He was a committee member of the Pastoral and Agricultural Association, and served as the secretary of the Young branch of the Country Party.

Freudenstein first attempted to enter politics at the 1956 state election, when he was defeated by the long-time Labor MLA for Young, Fred Cahill. Freudenstein finished third on that occasion; leakage from his preferences re-elected Cahill over the Liberal candidate. Cahill retired at the 1959 election, and Freudenstein defeated Goulburn mayor Ernie McDermott to win the seat on his second attempt. Freudenstein was easily re-elected seven times thereafter; Labor would never hold the seat of Young again. Freudenstein was a well-known and popular member in the Young area; Paul Gibson, a future Labor MLA who was a child in Young at the time, later remarked: "It sounds strange but I remember, when George married Joan back in 1960 in Young, it was like Prince Charles and Diana being married. That is the sort of impression it had on us kids at the time."

After ten years as a backbencher, Freudenstein entered the ministry in 1969 under Premier Robert Askin as Assistant Minister. He was promoted to Minister for Cultural Activities and Assistant Treasurer in 1971 and Minister for Conservation in 1972. He was the responsible minister when the Sydney Opera House opened in 1973. He shifted to the roles of Minister for Mines and Minister for Energy in 1975, holding them until the defeat of the Askin government in 1976. During the final term of the Askin Government, he ran for the position of Deputy Leader of the Country Party upon Leon Punch becoming leader, but was defeated by Tim Bruxner.

The Country Party initially maintained separate portfolios in opposition after the defeat of the Askin-led Coalition. In 1977, however, the parties established a joint shadow ministry, and Freudenstein returned to his prior portfolios as Shadow Minister for Mines and Energy. He was again touted as a possible deputy leader when Bruxner announced that he would retire at the 1981 election, but was by then seen as too old. Freudenstein's seat of Young was abolished in a redistribution before the same election, and he decided that he would also retire. On his retirement, he was granted by Queen Elizabeth II, on the Governor's recommendation, retention of the title "The Honourable" for life.

Freudenstein returned to his family farm and retired from political life after his retirement from the Legislative Assembly. He had a heart attack shortly after, but survived for another twenty-five years. He died in October 2007, and his funeral in Grenfell was widely attended.

New South Wales Legislative Assembly
| Preceded by Fred Cahill | Member for Young; 1959–1981 | District abolished |
Political offices
| New title | Minister for Cultural Activities; 1971–975 | Succeeded by John Barraclough as Minister for Culture, Sport and Recreation |
| Vacant Title last held by Clive Evatt | Assistant Treasurer of New South Wales; 1971–1972 | Succeeded by Wal Fife |
| Preceded by Wal Fife | Minister for Conservation; 1972–1975 | Vacant Title next held by Lin Gordon |
| Preceded by Wal Fife | Minister for Mines; 1975–1976 | Succeeded by Pat Hills |
| New title | Minister for Energy; 1975–1976 | Succeeded by Pat Hills |
