= Audrey Eyton =

English animal welfare campaigner and writer (1936–2019)

- Born: 11 January 1936; Blackburn
- Died: 30 June 2019 (aged 83); Canterbury
- Occupations: Animal welfare campaigner, writer

Audrey Eyton (11 January 1936 – 30 June 2019) was an English animal welfare campaigner, journalist and writer. She is best known for creating the F-Plan diet, a high-fibre diet that has been criticized as a fad diet.

== Biography ==
Eyton was born in Blackburn and as a child developed a passion for animals. She co-founded the Slimming Magazine in 1969 with her husband Tom Eyton, in Caterham, Surrey. They sold the business in 1980. Her son Matthew, a dedicated vegetarian died by suicide in 1991. She set up the Matthew Eyton Animal Welfare Trust, which has raised over the years £250,000 for animal charities. In 1991, she made a plea to end factory farming in her book, The Kind Food Guide. She presented a "Slim and Shine" slot on BBC's Breakfast Time.

She took part in animal rights demonstrations and raised several rescue pigs at her home in Canterbury. She was a trustee of Compassion in World Farming.

Eyton was not a vegan in her personal life but publicly supported vegan organisations long before the movement became mainstream. In her later years, Eyton was diagnosed with Parkinson's disease but continued her support for animal welfare.

== F-Plan diet ==
In 1982, Eyton authored The F-Plan Diet that was translated into sixteen languages. The book, which promoted a high-fibre diet became a bestseller and had sold over three million copies by 1985. The book was very successful in New Zealand and sold 75,000 copies in 49 days. Jane Ogden a Professor of Health Psychology noted that the F-Plan diet was widely promoted by the media in the 1980s and because of this "sales of bran-based cereals rose by 30%, wholewheat bread rose by 10%, wholewheat pasta rose by 70% and baked beans rose by 8%."

Eyton was inspired by the research of Denis Burkitt. Eyton's F-Plan is a low-fat high-fibre diet which recommends intake of 35–50g of fibre per day. It theorises that because fibre fills the stomach it will reduce the desire to overeat. Journalist Judith Wills described the F-Plan as "the first high-fiber weight-loss diet, and is still one of the most famous". The F-Plan is low-fat, but not vegetarian. Dairy and meat are allowed in small amounts.

Eyton also developed The F2 Diet, published in 2006. It was advertised as a "faster, more effective" version of the F-Plan diet.

=== Reception ===
The F-Plan diet is in alignment with mainstream nutritional advice in regard to consumption of fruits, vegetables and whole grains and research has continued to indicate the health benefits of eating high-fibre foods. However, due to its extreme emphasis on dietary fibre the F-Plan has often been listed as an example of a fad diet. A criticism of the diet is that it can cause constipation and flatulence.

Cardiologist J. Elliot Howard dismissed the F-Plan diet, commenting that "excessive fiber can cause flatulence and deficiencies in calcium, zinc, copper and iron. Weight is lost because this is a low-calorie diet in disguise." Professor of Surgery Henry Buchwald and colleagues noted that although the diet has health benefits it can lead to constipation if not accompanied by an increased intake of water and gastrointestinal upset if the diet is introduced too rapidly.

Nutritionist Judith S. Stern criticized the F-Plan diet as the fiber consumption is too extreme but described it as "one of the more benign fad diets". Conversely, Nutritionist Jack Z. Yetiv praised the F-Plan for preaching a "sensible diet plan" and noted that it is in the direction in which national dietary recommendations are being focused.

== Selected publications ==
- The F-Plan Diet (1982)
- The F-Plan Calorie and Fibre Chart (1982)
- The Safeway F-Plan (1985)
- The F-Plus Diet (1986)
- The Complete F-Plan Diet (1987)
- Amazing High-Fibre F-Plan Diet (1989)
- The Kind Food Guide (1991)
- The F2 Diet (2006)
