= Division of Bland =

Former Australian federal electoral division

Coordinates: 33°50′44″S 146°49′38″E

Bland Australian House of Representatives Division
- Created: 1901
- Abolished: 1906
- Namesake: William Bland

The Division of Bland was an Australian electoral division in New South Wales. The division was proclaimed in 1900, and was one of the original 65 divisions to be contested at the first federal election. It was abolished in 1906. It was named for Dr William Bland, a New South Wales colonial politician. Bland was held by Chris Watson, the first Leader of the federal parliamentary Labor Party and Australia's first Labor Prime Minister. When Bland was abolished in 1906, Watson transferred to South Sydney

Based in rural southern New South Wales, it included the towns of Narrandera, Young, Wagga Wagga and West Wyalong. When it was abolished, it was replaced by:

- the Division of Hume at Wagga Wagga (in the south)
- the Division of Werriwa at Young (in the east)
- the Division of Riverina in the south-western half of the remaining areas (including Narrandera and West Wyalong)
- the new Division of Calare for the remaining north-eastern half

== Members ==
Image	Member	Party	Term	Notes
	Chris Watson (1867–1941)	Labour	30 March 1901 – 12 December 1906	Previously held the New South Wales Legislative Assembly seat of Young. Served as Prime Minister in 1904. Served as Opposition Leader from 1904 to 1905. Transferred to the Division of South Sydney after Bland was abolished in 1906
