= James Gordon (Australian politician) =

Politician and solicitor in New South Wales, Australia

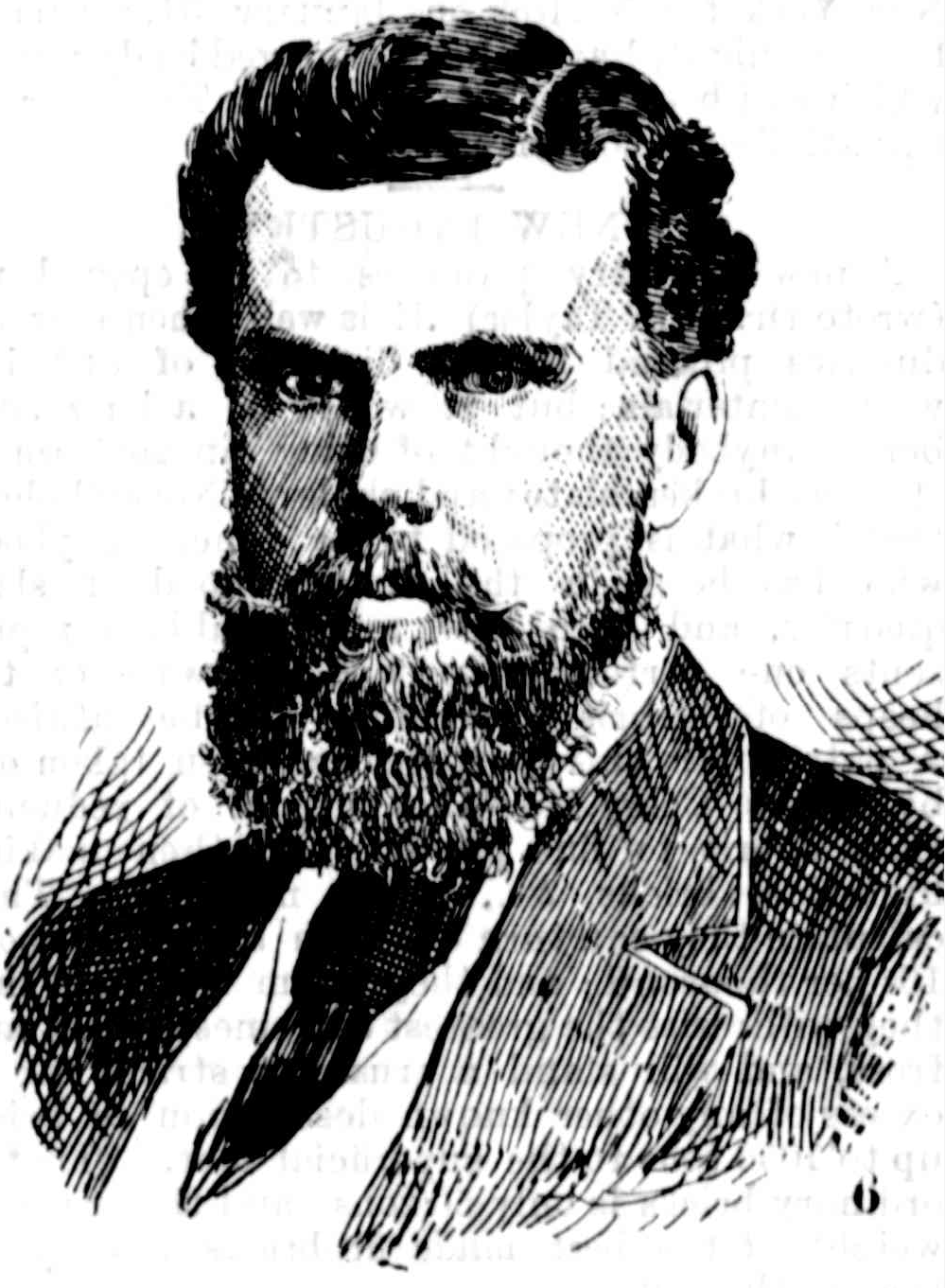
Mr James Gordon MLA for Young

James Gordon (27 June 1845 – 22 November 1914) was a politician and solicitor in New South Wales, Australia.

He was born at Braidwood to pastoralist Hugh Gordon and Mary Macarthur. His grandfather was Hannibal Hawkins Macarthur. He was educated at Macquarie Fields by his uncle, the Reverend George Fairfowl Macarthur. He became an articled clerk to solicitor John Dunsmore then an associate to John Hargrave in the District Court before being admitted as a solicitor in 1869. He settled in Young, and on 9 January 1872 married Eleanor Jamieson Grant, with whom he had seven children. In 1887 he was elected to the New South Wales Legislative Assembly as a Free Trade member for Young. He was defeated in 1889.

Gordon died at Young on 22 November 1914 (aged 69).

New South Wales Legislative Assembly
Preceded by Gerald Spring	Member for Young; 1887–1889; Served alongside: James Mackinnon	Succeeded by John Gough
