= William John Watson =

Irish-born Australian politician (1839–1886)

William John Watson (1839 – 18 August 1886) was an Irish-born Australian politician.

He was born at Stone Bridge in County Armagh to farmer James Watson and Sarah McLean. He was a wine merchant and pastoralist before entering politics. Around 1875 he married Georgina Hawkins, with whom he had a son. In 1880 he was elected to the New South Wales Legislative Assembly for Young, but he did not re-contest in 1882. His narrow victory in 1885 was overturned on appeal and James Mackinnon was installed in his place. Watson did not return to politics and died in Sydney in 1886.

New South Wales Legislative Assembly
New seat	Member for Young; 1880–1882; Served alongside: James Watson	Succeeded by James Mackinnon; Gerald Spring
Preceded by James Mackinnon	Member for Young; 1885; Served alongside: Gerald Spring	Succeeded by James Mackinnon
