= John George Gough =

Australian politician (1848–1907)

John George Gough (5 November 1848 – 15 November 1907) was one of the founders of the New South Wales Labour Party, initially the Labour Electoral League, the first political Labour movement in Australia. He was also one of Labour's five-member leadership group when the party first made its appearance in the New South Wales parliament in 1891. Representing Young, he was first elected in 1889 to the parliament's lower house as a member of the Protectionist Party, which produced Australia's first two prime ministers, Edmund Barton and Alfred Deakin. From 1891 to 1894 he represented Labour. Proud that his mother was Australian-born, he was a strong nationalist and republican. John Gough's maternal grandmother was half-aboriginal. He is the only one of Labor's founding fathers who has been found to have had aboriginal ancestry.

One of the pioneers of the Young-Grenfell district, he began his working life as a miner and also became a successful contract builder, leaving a fine legacy of public buildings across New South Wales. He was also a Methodist lay preacher – all but one of the 35 founding elected members of the New South Wales Labour Party were devout Methodists.

Descended from transported convicts on both sides, and orphaned at the age of 13, he was a self-made man.

== Background ==
John George Gough MLA with his family shortly after the birth of his son Bruce Australia Gough in 1892

Gough was of English ancestry on his father's side. His mother, Sarah Bruce, was the daughter of an Irish Presbyterian father and a half-aboriginal mother.

While according to Gough's death certificate he was born at Mount Egerton, Victoria, he referred in a parliamentary speech to having been born in Melbourne. His baptismal record describes his father, also John George Gough, as a stock-keeper of Darebin Creek, today Heidelberg in north-east Melbourne.

John George Gough senior was christened in 1807 at West Lavington, Wiltshire, England, and English census returns of his twin brother William show that he was born at the nearby hamlet of Littleton-Pannell. In 1824 he was sentenced to death for stealing a horse. But King George IV commuted the sentence to seven years' transportation, and he arrived in Sydney in 1825.

John George Gough senior married Sarah Jane Bruce at Melbourne's (Church of England) St James's Church in 1845. She was born around 1826 in New South Wales, probably in the Sydney area, the daughter of John Bruce, a transported Irish convict. John Bruce, a millwright born in Newry, County Down, in about 1792, to a Presbyterian family, was sentenced in Dublin in 1814 to seven years' transportation for stealing a watch, and arrived in Sydney the following year. In 1822, in Parramatta, he married Catherine Kelly, a Catholic born around 1798 probably in Dublin, and sentenced there in 1815 to fourteen years' transportation for attempting to pass a forged banknote.

Sarah was the only one of John Bruce's four children that we know of not to have been clearly connected to his wife Catherine either through a christening entry or through the evidence of the 1822 muster.

According to two different branches of fellow descendants, the story came down from previous generations that John Gough's mother Sarah had Aboriginal blood. According to one, traced back to his eldest son Albert, Sarah's mother was Ann, a "half-caste native".

Corroboration of Albert Gough's story is found in the details of John Bruce's family on the 1823–1825 NSW musters. Catherine Kelly, the mother of his other three children, is listed as his wife in 1823 but by 1825 Bruce's wife is Ann, 'born in the colony'. This Ann was probably the daughter of a European father and a woman of one of the Aboriginal clans in the Sydney area. Such births were rarely recorded.

According to a published biographical sketch of Gough when he entered the New South Wales parliament, his mother Sarah died when he was an infant. When his father died at Lambing Flat (later renamed Young) in September 1862, he was a butcher. He may have also been a gold-rush digger—a John Gough was one of the 3,394 signatories of the February 1861 miners' petition at Lambing Flat seeking government assistance to prevent Chinese gold-diggers competing with the Europeans.

John Gough senior died by "taking an overdose of strichnine". The coroner's report which might explain the reason has not survived. The day after his death, the local Burrangong Courier had no explanation for the event: "A man of the name of John George Gough, an old colonist, who occupied a butcher's shop adjoining Myers' cordial manufactory in Main Street, committed suicide yesterday morning by swallowing strychnine. He was in the Diggers' Theatre, apparently in excellent spirits, on the previous night, and no one now can tell what led to the sad act. Gough was a widower, and leaves a young son who is now unprotected, and for whom we now appeal to the sympathies of the generous in order that he may be enabled to earn an honest living."

== Miner, builder, preacher, politician ==
John George junior's life following his father's death was described as follows in the Town and Country Journal when he entered parliament:

The lad determined to find employment; and as a new rush, known as the 'ten mile' broke shortly afterward, he obtained his first employment there. A year later he decided to try his luck as a miner, and began work on the old 'Three Mile', known so well in the Young district. This occupation he followed with varying success for a period of twelve years. He was one of the first to try his luck at Grenfell and other gold rushes.

Five years later, finding gold-mining a precarious occupation, he abandoned it and turned his attention to the building trade, first as a journeyman and for years later as a contractor on his own account.

John Gough's courthouse at Young, NSW (today a school)

This proved highly remunerative, and Mr Gough has pursued it with the greatest success in Young and its neighbourhood. Among the large contracts carried out by him may be mentioned: the new courthouse Young (costing £13,000); railway station buildings Young (£14,000); Cowra railway station and water supply (£7,000), and new courthouse, Corowa (£10,000) Two years ago he took a partner into the building trade (a Mr Holworthy). They erected a large steam saw-mill and joinery works near the goods sheds, Young, and also run a brick factory. Mr Gough has always taken an active part in local politics, having been a member of the various progress committees of Young before it was incorporated.

Railway station at Cowra, NSW

He was also one of the prime movers in obtaining the incorporation of the borough, and was elected as one of the first aldermen. Mr Gough was one of the first to introduce steam power for sluicing purposes into the Young district.... Mr Gough came forward at the late general election at the express request of the working classes, with which he has been hitherto so largely identified: and as such and as a protectionist he defeated Mr Gordon, the popular free trade candidate.

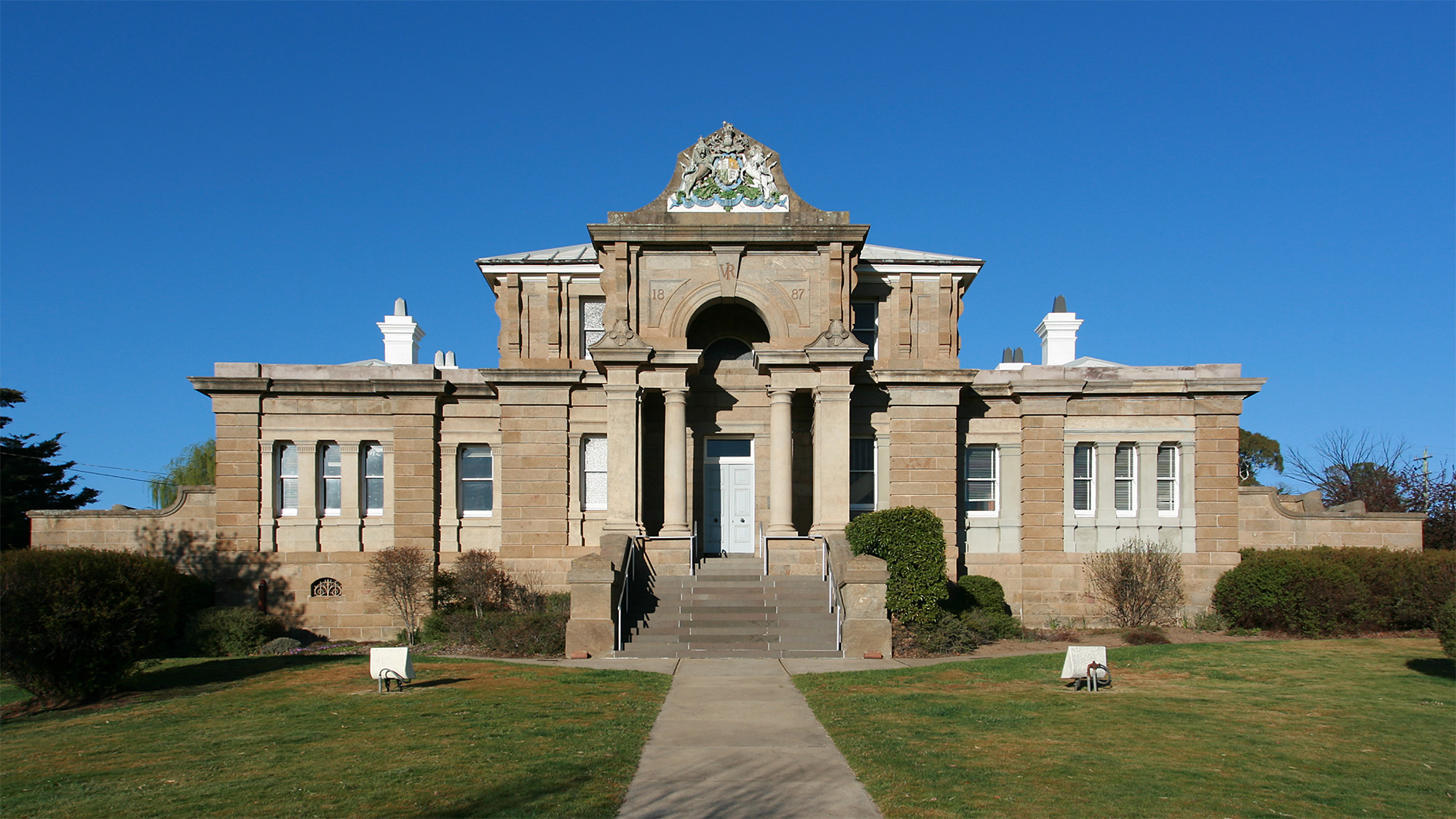
Courthouse at Cooma, NSW

According to his obituary in Young's Burrangong Argus, John Gough built a further courthouse, at Cooma. According to the same newspaper, he first entered politics while engaged in its construction. To return from Cooma to Young for the 5 February 1886 local elections there, it noted that he accomplished the 180-mile journey in two days with the same pair of horses, 'a feat which would take a great deal of beating'.

John Gough also built Grenfell's Methodist church and was said to have been 'a very prominent and able' prayer leader and lay preacher for the Primitive Methodist Church at Young. Records show him working as a Methodist preacher from 1866 - when he wasn't older than eighteen - to 1879.

John Gough married Martha Ann Clift at Grenfell in 1869. She was the daughter of free settlers who had emigrated from Suffolk in 1853 and settled in the Young district in the early 1860s. Martha's father Joshua was a farmer and, like John Gough, was a Methodist preacher in the Young district. Martha bore John eleven children between 1870 and 1892.

In the 1889 New South Wales election, Gough was elected as a Protectionist Party candidate, along with sitting protectionist member James Mackinnon, defeated the sitting Free Trade Party member James Gordon. Both Gough and Mackinnon joined the Labour Party for the 1891 election, where both retained their seats. In parliament Gough was a strong proponent of protectionist and Australian nationalist and republican views. In March 1894, however, the Labour Party split following the decision to make all members sign a "pledge" to be bound by decisions of the Parliamentary Labor Party (Caucus). 18 of the 35 members, including the leader Joseph Cook, Mackinnon, and Gough refused to sign the pledge. Gough's refusal was attributed to "conscientious reasons", "even though he favoured nearly every plank in their platform". While Cook joined the Free Trade Party, both Mackinnon and Gough returned to the Protectionist Party. The seat was reduced to a single member for the 1894 election where the Labour candidate was Chris Watson, later to become Australia's first Labor Prime Minister, while Mackinnon and Gough split the protectionist vote, with Watson winning despite receiving only 44.6% of the vote.

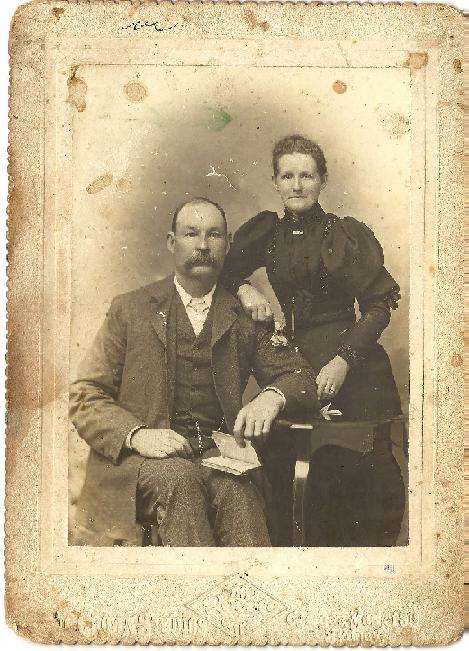
John and Martha Gough about 1900

Descendants recall that children at the school taunted the Gough children after their father lost his seat in Parliament with 'Goughs, Goughs, fallen toffs'.

Martha Gough and the children shortly after the construction of Mildon Hall, Young, around 1893

During his time as an MLA he constructed a grand residential villa, Mildon Hall, which overlooked Young and his courthouse. The house's name was probably a reference to Mildenhall, Suffolk, where John's wife, Martha Clift, was born. She bought the land in 1892, and the villa seems to have been constructed around November 1893. The property was sold in 1906. The building was again sold in 1920, and became the core of a Roman Catholic nursing home, today known as Mount St Joseph's Nursing Home. The house has been substantially and unsympathetically altered.

According to his obituary in the Burrangong Argus, after his parliamentary career, he retired from the Young community "and returned to his old love by again attaching himself to mining pursuits. Just after the Wyalong rush broke out, he became associated with a large cyanide plant on that field, and from that day until his death was associated with mining ventures, seeking reward at Yalgogrin, Cooma, Yambulla and other places, the dredging plant at Craigie being one of his last investments."

Indeed, he appears to have moved around extensively in his final years. According to the Australian Heritage Places Inventory, in the early 1890s he bought the Cullinga gold mining operation near Wallendbeen in Cootamundra shire. His name then appears as the occupier of land adjacent to the Little Bog River at Quinburra near Craigie on a 1902 map. On the 1903 electoral roll, described as a mining manager, he appears with his wife and daughter Effie at Yambulla, another remote area straddling the NSW-Victorian border between Bombala and Eden. In 1906, he appears on the electoral roll at the equally remote Cowra Creek, north-east of Cooma.

He died on 15 November 1907, according to newspaper reports at his residence 'Quinburra', Craigie NSW. According to his obituary, on 5 November (his 59th birthday) "...whilst engaged at the dredging plant at Craigie, near Bombala - of which he was part-owner and manager - (he) was struck by the nozzle of one of the pipes connected with the dredge. He was taken home, and though for some time he suffered a great deal of pain, his suffering gradually eased. No fears were entertained of any fatal result, but on Friday night Death came with an awful suddenness."

Directories from the time indicate that there were two houses in the Craigie area called 'Quinburra'. One survives—but not the house in which John Gough lived. There are ruins on John Gough's former land, probably of the other 'Quinburra'.

John Gough was buried in the Methodist section at Delegate cemetery, where his headstone survives.

Adding that he was respectfully known as 'Jack' Gough to his many friends, the Burrangong Argus obituary commented on his enthusiasm for public matters, his militancy, strong determination, courageous opinions, and skills as a platform speaker, including a 'fine ringing voice' and 'command of emphatic language which he expressed fluently'. Obituaries were also carried in the Young Chronicle, and the Grenfell Record.

A reminiscence written about John George Gough by the Young Chronicle on the occasion of the death of his widow in 1927 recalled that he was known for his jovial disposition, and was rarely seen without a cigar.

New South Wales Legislative Assembly
Preceded by James Gordon	Member for Young; 1889–1894; Served alongside: James Mackinnon	Succeeded by Chris Watson
