= James Watson (Australian politician) =

Australian politician

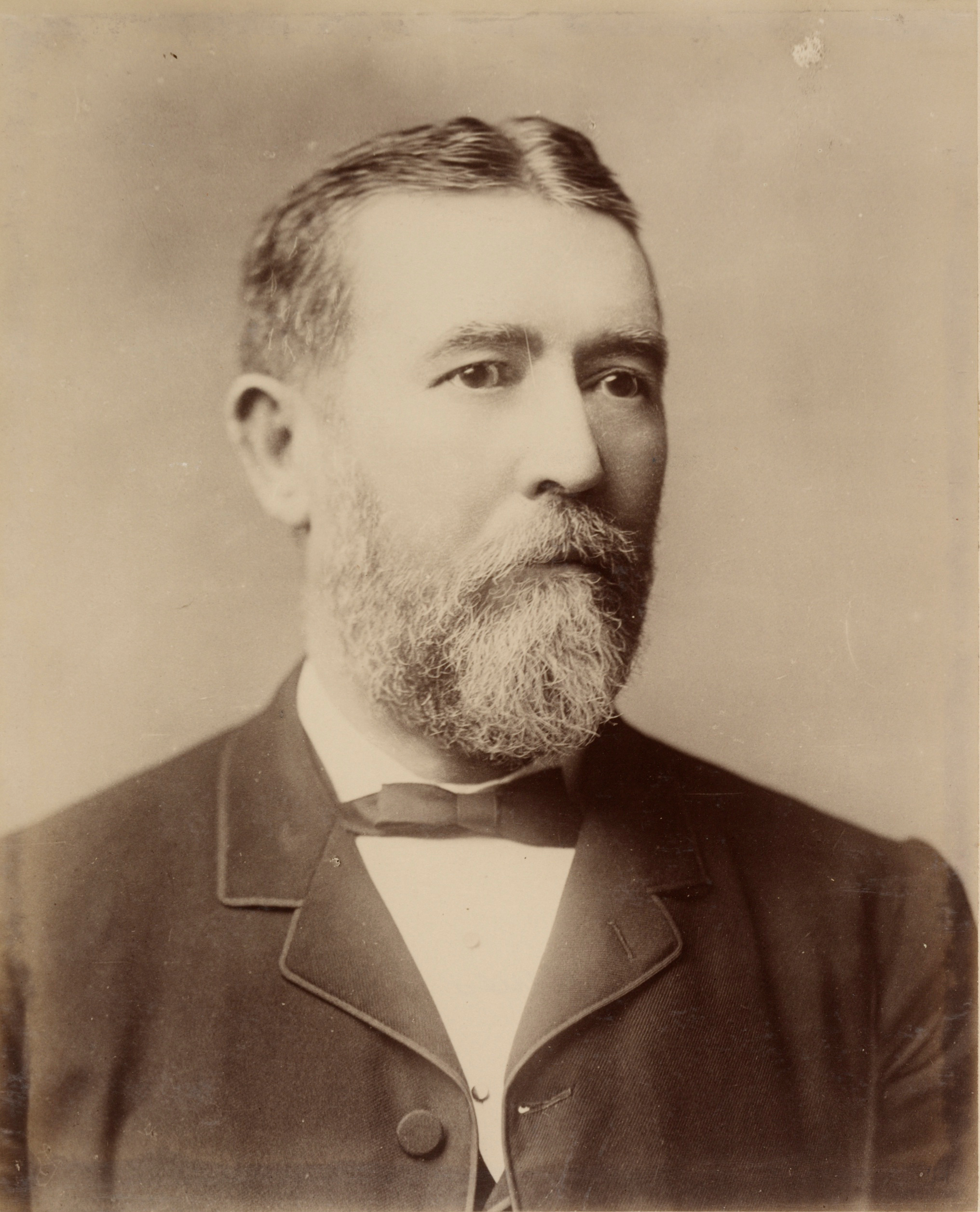

James Watson (17 December 1837 – 30 October 1907) was an Australian politician, Colonial Treasurer of New South Wales 1878 to 1883.

== Early life ==
Watson was born at Portadown, in County Armagh, Ireland, and educated at the Church of England school in his native town. He emigrated to the colony of New South Wales early in life, and engaged in mercantile pursuits, initially in partnership with his brothers at Lambing Flat (Young). Provisions for their store were obtained from John Frazer & Co., a partnership between John Frazer and his brother in law James Ewan. Frazer retired from the running of the business in 1869 and Watson joined Ewan as a partner in the firm. On 8 April 1871 Watson married Margaret Salmon Ewan, another of Ewan's sisters.

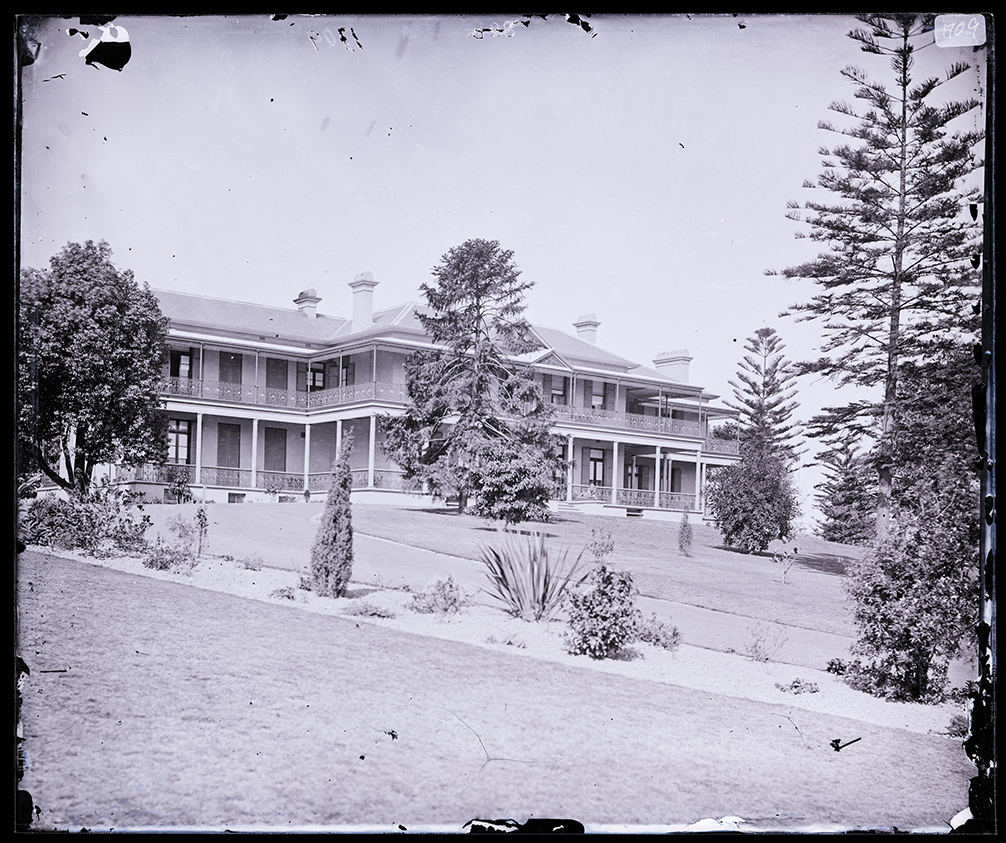
Glanworth, Darling Point 1880

== Political career ==
He was a candidate for the Legislative Assembly seat of The Lachlan, which included the town of Young, at the election in December 1869, serving until 1880 when the district was abolished. He initially supported the ministry of James Martin, before becoming a supporter of Henry Parkes in 1872. He remained independent however and vigorously pursued Parkes' Treasurer, George Lloyd, in parliament in relation to the lease of Circular Quay and voted against Parkes in relation to the release of the bushranger Frank Gardiner. The censure motion was defeated only by the casting vote of the Speaker, however it brought about the downfall of the Parkes government. He declined a position in the fourth Robertson ministry. Watson was Colonial Treasurer in the third Parkes ministry from December 1878 to January 1883.

The district of The Lachlan was abolished in the 1880 redistribution, and Watson chose to contest the new 2 member district of Young. He was successful at the election in November 1880, serving with the unrelated William Watson, but was defeated at the election for Young in December 1882, and 5 days later was unsuccessful in contesting Illawarra.

He was returned to the Legislative Assembly at the Gundagai by-election in April 1884 serving until parliament was dissolved in October 1885, but did stand at the 1885 election. In February 1887 was appointed to the New South Wales Legislative Council.

== Later life and death ==
Margaret was unwell and they visited England, however Margaret died shortly after their return in 1886. Ewan and Watson liquidated the firm of John Frazer & Co. in 1891, with "all the partners retiring on fairly ample fortunes". In 1897 Watson became a director of the Australian Joint Stock Bank.

He died at his home in Glanworth, Darling Point on October 30, 1907 (aged 69).

Parliament of New South Wales
Political offices
Preceded by Henry Cohen	Colonial Treasurer; 1878 – 1883	Succeeded by George Dibbs
New South Wales Legislative Assembly
Preceded by James Martin	Member for Lachlan; 1869 – 1880	District abolished
New district	Member for Young; 1880 – 1882; With: William Watson	Succeeded by James Mackinnon; Gerald Spring
Preceded by Bruce Smith	Member for Gundagai; 1884 – 1885	Succeeded by Jack Want
