= Gerald Spring =

Australian politician

Gerald Spring (1 July 1830 – 9 November 1888) was an Australian politician, member of the New South Wales Legislative Assembly and Secretary for Lands in the 1880s.

Spring was born in Castlemaine, County Kerry, Ireland. He was the youngest child of Francis Spring and his wife Catherine, née Fitzgerald., and a descendant of the Anglo-Irish Spring family. Gerald Spring arrived in New South Wales around 1853. Spring became chief constable at Dubbo, New South Wales in 1862 and a sheep inspector for Coonabarabran, New South Wales in 1865.

Spring was elected as member for the district of Wellington in 1869 for a three-year term. On 4 December 1882, he was elected to the seat of Young and held the seat until 26 January 1887. Spring was Secretary for Lands from December 1885 to February 1886.

On 27 August 1867 Spring married Jane née Watt; their son David Spring, also became a member of the New South Wales Legislative Assembly. On 9 November 1888 Spring died of tuberculosis at his property Moorong near Young, New South Wales, and was buried in the Church of England cemetery at Young.

His son, Thomas Spring, was a candidate for the seat of Cootamundra in the 1913 New South Wales state election.

New South Wales Legislative Assembly
Preceded by Saul Samuel	Member for Wellington; 1869–1872	Succeeded by John Samuel Smith
Preceded by William Watson; James Watson	Member for Young; 1882–1887; Served alongside: Mackinnon/Watson	Succeeded by James Gordon
