= Judith Wills =

Judith Wills (born 1949) is a British author, food and health journalist, magazine editor and columnist. She was born in Oxfordshire, the youngest child of a telephone salesman and an ex-primary schoolteacher, and was educated at the Oxford College of Technology (now Oxford Brookes University . She lives on the borders of Herefordshire and Wales.

== Career ==
In 1967, at age 17, she moved to London and became a secretary, then a writer, for the UK's pop culture magazine Fabulous at the end of the Swinging Sixties, and spent many years in the London media and show business scene.

Wills was editor of Slimmer magazine for over 10 years and then wrote a weekly food column in The Daily Express. She writes for several websites including Netmums and Saga and for magazines including Saga and Candis.

Her books have been published in 14 languages. The best known book is The Food Bible, which is held by 1400 libraries according to WorldCat

She has also written numerous related diet books, cookbooks, and an autobiography, Keith Moon Stole My Lipstick, published by UKA Press in 2008 and by The History Press in 2016, and held in 10 libraries according to WorldCat The book has been featured in Women's Weekly and Candis Magazine.

== Bibliography ==
=== Non-fiction ===
- The Food Bible First publish in 1998 by London : Quadrille, ISBN 9781899988976, and New York : Simon & Schuster Editions ISBN 9780684856926 Revised ed.. in 2007. New and completely revised edition published by White Owl in February 2019 in hardback and February 2020 in paperback.
- The Diet Bible
- Feeding Kids Headline.
- The Green Food Bible
- The Garden to Kitchen Expert with Dr D. G. Hessayon, Transworld.
- The Children’s Food Bible
- Take Off 10 Years in 10 Weeks
- Everyday Eating for Babies and Children
- Midlife, New Life London : Quadrille.
- 6 Ways to Lose a Stone in 6 Weeks
- The Omega Diet
- Judith Wills' Slimmer's Cookbook
- Judith Wills' Virtually Vegetarian

Wills' autobiographical story Keith Moon Stole My Lipstick, about her life in her late teens and early twenties working for one of the leading pop magazines of the 60s/70s was first published by UKA Press in 2008 and then in 2016 by The History Press.

Her books have been serialized in many UK national newspapers, including The Sunday Times, The Mail on Sunday and The Daily Mail.

=== Magazines and Newspapers ===
Wills has written for many national magazines and newspapers, including The Times, The Daily Mail, The Mirror, Daily Express, Good Housekeeping, Woman’s Weekly, Zest, Slimming, Marie Claire, Saga Magazine and Waitrose Food Illustrated. She has a regular blog on the Saga organisation website.

=== Radio and TV ===
Wills has starred in three Top 10 videos adapted from her books and has made many TV appearances and over 500 radio broadcasts.
