= Electoral district of Young =

Former state electoral district of New South Wales, Australia

Young was an electoral district for the Legislative Assembly in the Australian state of New South Wales, named after and including the town of Young. It elected two members between 1880 and 1894 and one member from 1894 to 1904, when it was replaced by Burrangong. The sitting member George Burgess (Labour) successfully contested Burrangong. In 1920, with the introduction of proportional representation, Burrangong was absorbed by the three member district of Cootamundra. Proportional representation was abandoned in 1927 and Young was recreated. It was abolished in 1981 and the district was split with Young being absorbed by Burrinjuck while the towns of Cowra and Forbes were absorbed by a re-created Lachlan.

== Members for Young ==
Two members (1880—1894)
Member	Party	Term	Member	Party	Term
James Watson	None	1880–1882	William Watson	None	1880–1882
Gerald Spring	None	1882–1887	James Mackinnon	None	1882–1885
Gerald Spring	None	1882–1887	William Watson	None	1885–1885
Gerald Spring	None	1882–1887	James Mackinnon	None	1885–1887
James Gordon	Free Trade	1887–1889	James Mackinnon	Protectionist	1887–1891
John Gough	Protectionist	1889–1891	James Mackinnon	Protectionist	1887–1891
John Gough	Labour	1891–1894	James Mackinnon	Labour	1891–1894
Single-member (1894—1904)
Member	Party	Term			
Chris Watson	Labour	1894–1901			
George Burgess	Labour	1901–1904			
Single-member (1927—1981)
Member	Party	Term			
Albert Reid	Country	1927–1930			
Clarrie Martin	Labor	1930–1932			
Albert Reid	Country	1932–1941			
Fred Cahill	Labor	1941–1959			
George Freudenstein	Country	1959–1981			

== Election results ==
1978 New South Wales state election: Young
Party	Candidate	Votes	%	±%
National Country	George Freudenstein	11,625	53.0	−5.4
Labor	Timothy West	10,287	47.0	+5.4
Total formal votes		21,912	98.4	−0.2
Informal votes		351	1.6	+0.2
Turnout		22,263	94.7	−0.3
National Country hold		Swing	−5.4	
