= Chris Watson =

Prime Minister of Australia in 1904

The Honourable Chris Watson
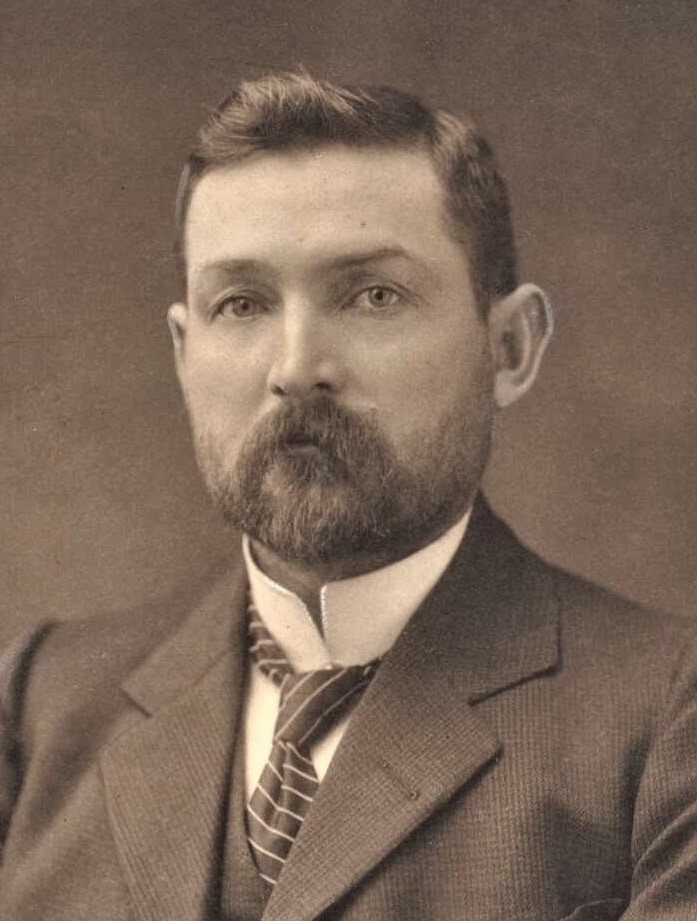
- Official portrait c. 1904

3rd Prime Minister of Australia
- In office 27 April 1904 – 18 August 1904
- Monarch: Edward VII
- Governor-General: Lord Northcote
- Preceded by: Alfred Deakin
- Succeeded by: George Reid

Treasurer of Australia
- In office 27 April 1904 – 17 August 1904
- Prime Minister: Himself
- Preceded by: Sir George Turner
- Succeeded by: Sir George Turner

Leader of the Labour Party
- In office 20 May 1901 – 30 October 1907
- Deputy: Gregor McGregor
- Preceded by: Position created
- Succeeded by: Andrew Fisher

Leader of the Opposition
- In office 18 August 1904 – 5 July 1905
- Prime Minister: George Reid
- Deputy: Gregor McGregor
- Preceded by: George Reid
- Succeeded by: George Reid

Member of the Australian Parliament for South Sydney
- In office 12 December 1906 – 19 February 1910
- Preceded by: George Edwards
- Succeeded by: Edward Riley

Member of the Australian Parliament for Bland
- In office 30 March 1901 – 12 December 1906
- Preceded by: Division created
- Succeeded by: Division abolished

Member of the New South Wales Parliament for Young
- In office 17 July 1894 – 30 March 1901
- Preceded by: John Gough and James Mackinnon
- Succeeded by: George Burgess

Personal details
- Born: Johan Cristian Tanck; 9 April 1867 Valparaíso, Chile
- Died: 18 November 1941 (aged 74) Double Bay, New South Wales, Australia
- Party: Nationalist (1917–1922); National Labor (1916–1917); Labor (1901–1916); Labour Electoral League (1891–1901)
- Spouses: Ada Low (m. 1889; died 1921) Antonia Dowlan (m. 1925)
- Children: 1
- Education: Weston School
- Occupation: Petroleum company director (Australian Motorists Petrol Co Ltd); Trade union print company director (Labor Papers Ltd); Trade union executive (Sydney Trades and Labor Council)

John Christian Watson (born Johan Cristian Tanck; 9 April 1867 – 18 November 1941) was the third prime minister of Australia, serving from April to August 1904. He held office as the inaugural federal leader of the Australian Labor Party (ALP) from 1901 to 1907 and was the first member of the party to serve as prime minister.

Watson was born in Valparaíso, Chile, the son of a German Chilean seaman. He grew up on the South Island of New Zealand, taking the surname of his step-father when his Irish-born mother remarried. He left school at a young age, working in the printing industry as a compositor. Watson moved to Sydney in 1886 and became prominent in the local labour movement. He helped establish the Labor Electoral League of New South Wales and directed the party's campaign at the 1891 general election. Watson was elected to the New South Wales Legislative Assembly at the 1894 election, aged 27, and quickly became a leading figure in the ALP. He and most party members opposed Federation on the grounds that the proposed constitution was undemocratic.

In 1901, Watson was elected to the House of Representatives at the inaugural federal election. He became a founding member of the ALP caucus in federal parliament and was elected as the party's inaugural leader. During the first term of parliament he supported the Liberal Protectionist governments of Edmund Barton and Alfred Deakin, and was a strong supporter of the White Australia policy. At the 1903 election, the ALP secured the balance of power in the House and a strong position in the Senate. Watson formed a minority government in April 1904, aged 37, after the ALP withdrew its support from Deakin. He was one of the first socialists to head a government in a parliamentary system, attracting international attention, and remains Australia's youngest prime minister.

After less than four months in office, the Watson government lost a confidence motion and Watson was succeeded as prime minister by anti-socialist George Reid. He was leader of the opposition until 1905, when he helped reinstall Deakin as prime minister. The ALP continued to offer its support to Deakin after the 1906 election, despite the opposition of some in the party. Watson resigned the party's leadership in 1907, citing family concerns, and left parliament at the 1910 election. He was expelled from the ALP during the 1916 split over conscription and became a Nationalist, although he never again stood for public office. He subsequently had a successful business career, including as president of the NRMA and chairman of Ampol.

While Watson did not succeed in passing legislation while in office, his term as prime minister is seen as significant as a demonstration that the ALP could form a competent government. His successor as party leader Andrew Fisher would lead the ALP to a majority government at the 1910 election, in which many of Watson's ministers played a key role.

== Early life ==
=== Birth and family background ===
Watson was born Johan Cristian Tanck on 9 April 1867 in Valparaíso, Chile. He was the only child of Martha (née Minchin) and Johan Cristian Tanck, senior. His father was also born in Valparaíso, a German Chilean whose ancestors had emigrated from the Kingdom of Hanover and established an import–export firm. He worked as a merchant seaman, possibly a ship's carpenter, on trade routes across the Pacific. He arrived in New Zealand aboard La Joven Julia on 24 December 1865 and married Martha Minchin in Port Chalmers less than a month later, on 19 January 1866. Their marriage was later registered at Valparaíso's Iglesia de la Matriz. Watson's mother was born in County Tipperary, Ireland, and was 16 years old at the time of her marriage to Tanck. She joined him on board the Julia, which eventually returned to Chile and docked in Valparaíso a few days before Watson's birth. In the months after his birth the ship worked a regular route carrying timber between Valparaíso and Chiloé Island.

In 1868, Watson moved to New Zealand with his mother, returning to her family on the South Island. The fate of his father is uncertain, as no records of his death have been found. On 15 February 1869, his mother married George Thomas Watson at the registry office in Waipori, describing herself as a widow. Her second husband was a 30-year-old miner born in Ballymoney, Ireland, who had come to New Zealand after several years working in Scotland. Watson came to have nine half-siblings from his mother's second marriage, born between 1869 and 1887. He was treated as the biological child of George Watson, adopting his step-father's surname; his given names were also anglicised.

As an adult, Watson gave incorrect and contradictory information about the circumstances of his birth and the identity of his parents. He allowed some biographical profiles to list him as born in New Zealand, while his second wife and daughter understood that he had been born to British parents in international waters outside Valparaíso. On legal documents he listed George Watson as his biological father and provided an incorrect maiden name for his mother. Watson's biographers have suggested he may have originally concealed his background for convenience, but later deliberately did so for political reasons, including concerns over parliamentary eligibility and possible xenophobia. Birth overseas to a non-British father would have made him an alien ineligible for election to federal parliament under section 44(i) of the constitution.

=== Childhood and move to Australia ===
Watson attended the state school in Oamaru, North Otago, New Zealand until ten years of age when he left to become a rail nipper. Then after a period of helping on the family farm, at thirteen years of age he was apprenticed as a compositor at The North Otago Times, a newspaper run by prominent reformist politician William Steward, with the public affairs exposure augmenting his minor formal schooling. Following the death of his mother and the loss of his job, he migrated to Sydney in 1886 at nineteen years of age. He worked for a month as a stablehand at Government House, then found employment as a compositor for a number of newspapers including The Daily Telegraph, Sydney Morning Herald and The Australian Star. Through this proximity to newspapers, books and writers he furthered his education and developed an interest in politics and became active in the printing union. He married Ada Jane Low, a British-born Sydney seamstress, at the Unitarian Church on Liverpool Street in Sydney on 27 November 1889.

== Colonial parliament ==
In the months prior to the 1891 New South Wales colonial election, Watson was a founding member of the Labour Electoral League of New South Wales which stemmed from the nascent Australian labour movement and would later develop into the Australian Labour (later Labor) Party. In the election, Labour won the balance of power and provided confidence and supply to the Protectionist Party minority government led by Premier George Dibbs which brought down the incumbent majority government of the Free Trade Party led by Premier Henry Parkes. Watson was an active trade unionist, and became vice-president of the Sydney Trades and Labour Council in January 1892. In June 1892, he settled a dispute between the Trades and Labour Council and the Labour Party and as a result became the president of the council and chairman of the party. In 1893 and 1894, he worked hard to resolve the debate over the solidarity pledge and established the Labour Party's basic practices, including the sovereignty of the party conference, caucus solidarity, the pledge required of parliamentarians and the powerful role of the extra-parliamentary executive. At the 1894 colonial election which saw the defeat of the Protectionist Party government, Watson was elected to the New South Wales Legislative Assembly for the country seat of Young.

At the 1895 colonial election the incumbent Free Trade Party minority government led by Premier George Reid increased their support but remained several seats short of a majority. Labour at this time had a policy of "support in return for concessions", and Watson voted with his colleagues to strategically provide such legislative support to the incumbent government. Following the 1898 colonial election, despite a significant swing against the incumbent government, Watson and Labour leader James McGowen decided to allow the incumbent government to remain so that it could complete the work of establishing the Federation of Australia.

== Federation ==
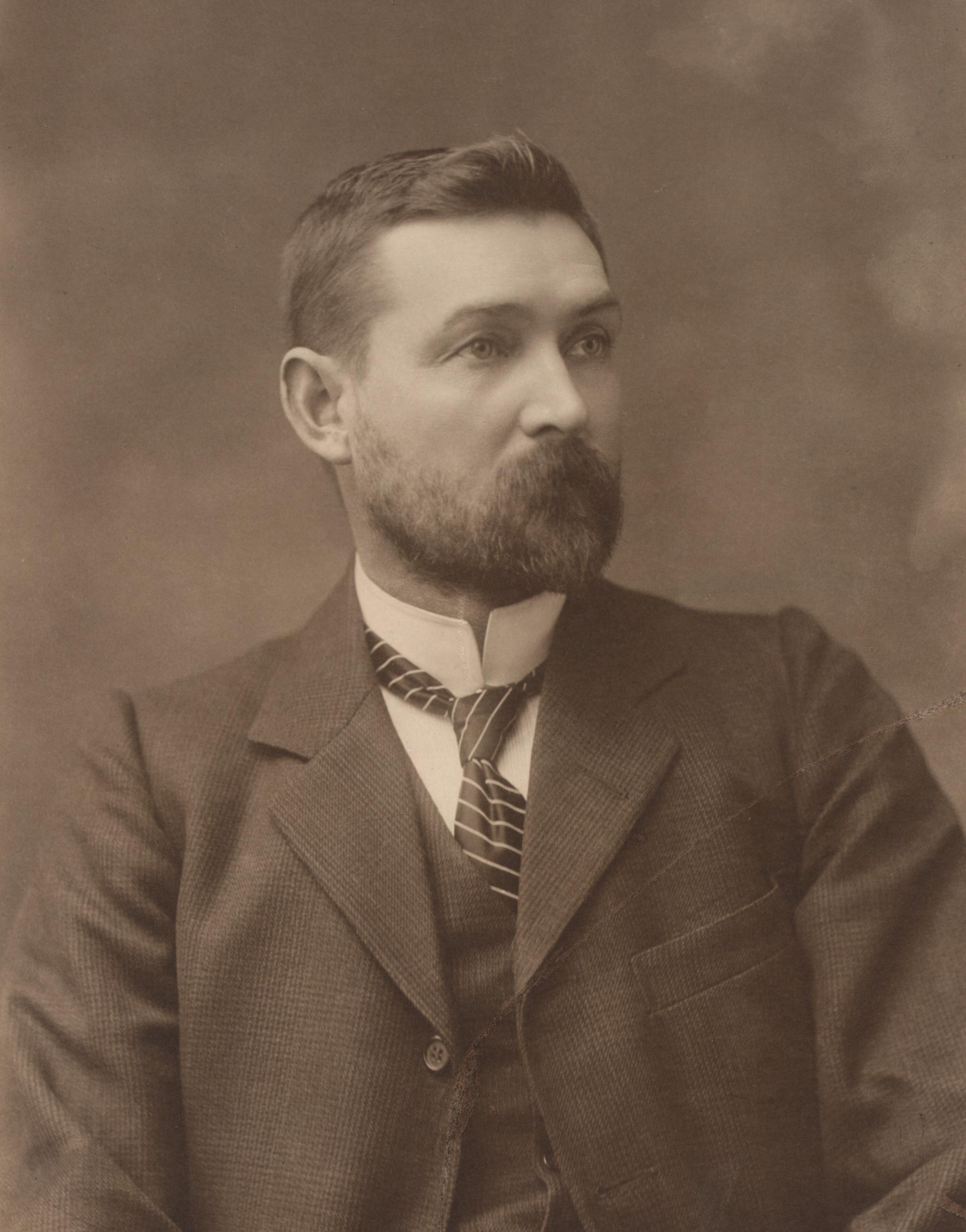
Chris Watson

Watson was involved in shaping party policy regarding the movement for Federation from 1895, and was one of ten Labour candidates nominated for the Australasian Federal Convention on 4 March 1897, but none of these candidates managed to be elected. The party endorsed Federation, but nevertheless most leading party figures viewed the draft Commonwealth Constitution as undemocratic, and believed that the Senate as proposed was much too powerful, similar to the anti-reformist Colonial state upper houses and the UK House of Lords. When the draft was submitted to a referendum on 3 June 1898, Labour opposed it, with Watson prominent in the campaign, and saw the referendum rejected.

Watson was devoted to the idea of the referendum as an ideal feature of democracy. To ensure that Reid might finally bring New South Wales into national union on an amended draft constitution, Watson helped to negotiate a deal, involving the party executive, that included the nomination of four Labour members to the New South Wales Legislative Council.

At the March 1899 annual party conference, Billy Hughes and Holman moved to have those arrangements nullified and party policy on Federation changed, thus thwarting Reid's plans. Although rarely known to resort to anger, on this occasion Watson 'jumped to his feet in a most excited manner and in heated tones ... contended ... that they should not interfere with the referendum'. The motion was lost and the four party men were nominated to the council on 4 April. The bill approving the second referendum, to be held on 20 June 1899, was passed on 20 April.

Labour leaders, including Watson opposed the final terms of the Commonwealth Constitution. Nonetheless, they could not stop it from going ahead, and Watson, unlike Holman and Hughes, believed that it should be submitted to the people. Nevertheless, Watson joined all but two of the Labour parliamentarians in campaigning against the 'Yes' vote at the referendum. When the Constitution was accepted, he agreed that 'the mandate of the majority will have to be obeyed'.

== Federal parliament ==
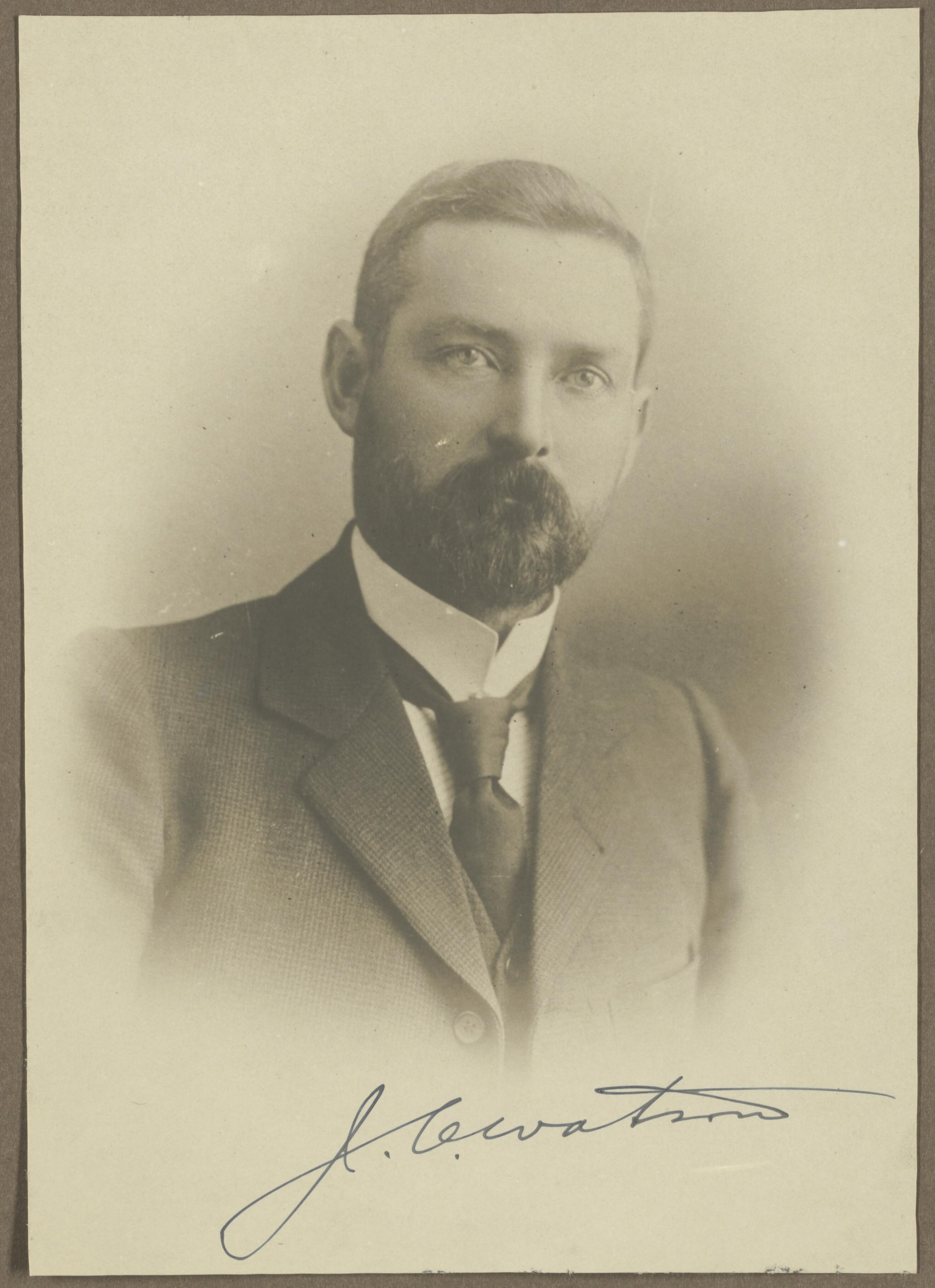
Signed photograph of Watson

Watson was elected to the new federal Parliament of Australia at the inaugural 1901 federal election, representing the rural House of Representatives rural seat of Bland.

Watson arrived in Melbourne, which at the time served as the temporary seat of government, in May 1901. Watson was elected the first leader of the Federal Parliamentary Labor Party (usually known as the Caucus) on 8 May 1901, the day before the opening of the parliament.

Watson pursued the same policy as Labor had done in New South Wales, where Labor was the smallest of the three parties but held the balance of power. Under Watson, Labor provided confidence and supply to the Protectionist Party minority governments of Edmund Barton and Alfred Deakin in exchange for legislation enacting the Labour platform, such as the immensely popular White Australia policy which left the free Trade Party led by George Reid to form the opposition.

Watson, as a Labor moderate, genuinely admired Deakin and shared his liberal views on many subjects. Deakin reciprocated this sentiment. Deakin wrote in one of his anonymous articles in a London newspaper that "The Labour section has much cause for gratitude to Mr Watson, the leader whose tact and judgement have enabled it to achieve many of its Parliamentary successes."

=== White Australia ===
Watson was a white nationalist and white supremacist who played a key role in the creation of the White Australia policy. According to Hearn (2007), the "ideal of a white Australia stood at the centre of Watson's political ideology, a touchstone of Australian identity that Watson repeatedly stressed in interviews, speeches and articles". However, some of his biographers have noted that his racial views were widespread among Australians at the time and that all three major parties supported White Australia.

During the debate over what became the Immigration Restriction Act 1901, Watson stated that the issue of racial purity was "the larger and more important one" for the passage of the bill, where some speakers had emphasised concerns over the economic impact of cheap foreign labour. He opposed the government's dictation test provision on the grounds that it could be easily circumvented, and that "education does not eliminate the objectionable qualities of the Baboo Hindoo". He instead sought to explicitly ban any Asian or African from entering Australia. During the same debate he spoke of "racial contamination" and referred to Chinese people using a racial slur, rhetorically asking "whether we would desire that our sisters or our brothers should be married into any of these races to which we object".

In 1905, Watson drafted a new plank for the ALP platform calling for "an Australian sentiment based upon the maintenance of racial purity". He successfully moved for its adoption at both state and federal conferences, stating that the party should "cleanse their own doorstep with the hope that thus the street would be cleansed".

== Prime Minister in 1904 ==
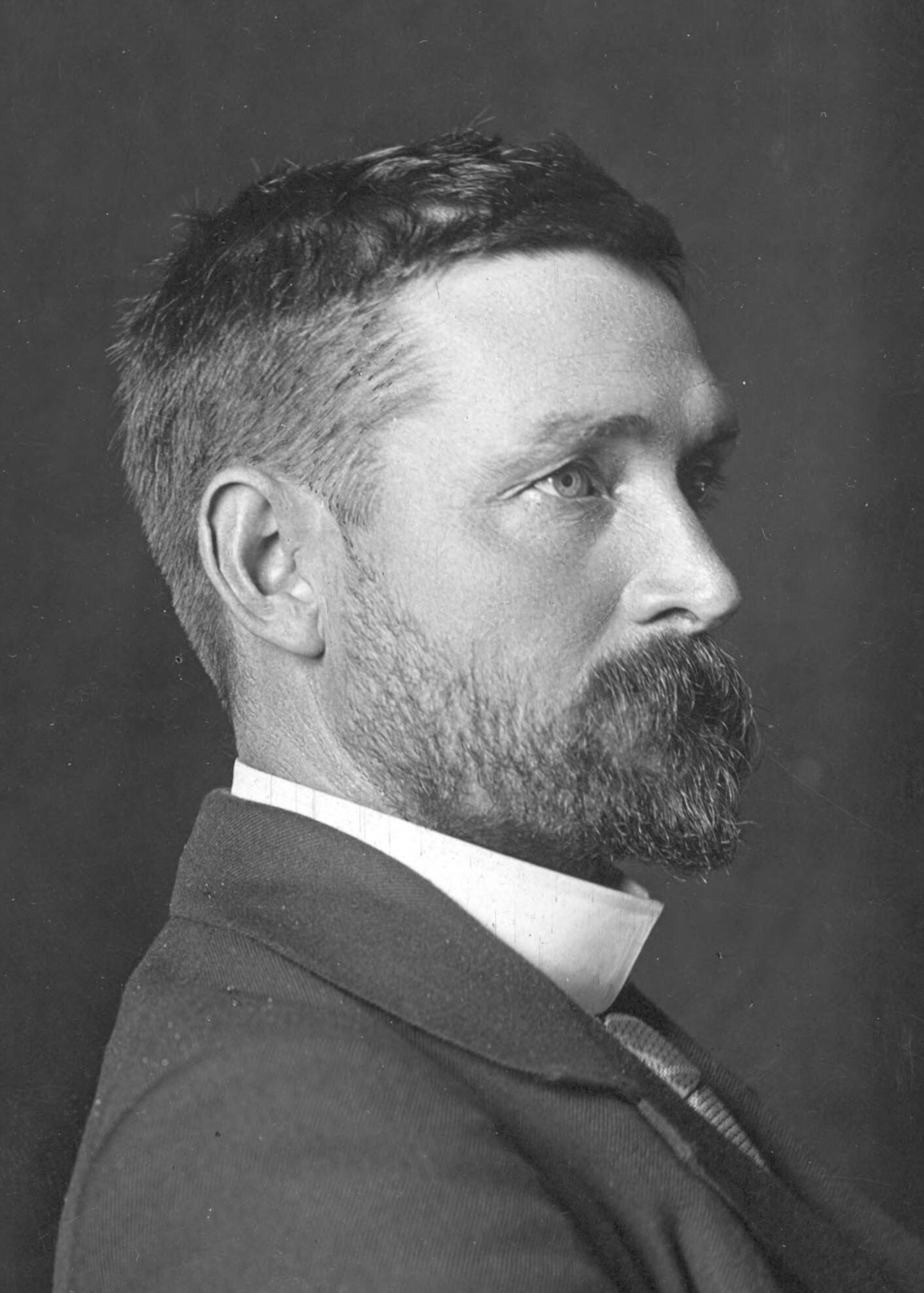
Watson c. 1904

Labour under Watson doubled their vote at the 1903 federal election and continued to hold the balance of power despite all three parties holding about the same number of seats. In April 1904, however, Watson and Deakin fell out over the issue of extending the scope of industrial relations laws concerning the Conciliation and Arbitration Bill to cover state public servants, the fallout causing Deakin to resign. Reid declined to take office, which saw Watson become the first Labour Prime Minister of Australia, the world's first Labour head of government at a national level (Anderson Dawson had led a short-lived Labour government in Queensland in December 1899), indeed the world's first socialist or social democratic government at a national level. He was aged only 37, and remains the youngest prime minister in Australia's history.

Billy Hughes later recalled the first meeting of the Labour Cabinet with characteristic sharp wit:

Mr Watson, the new Prime Minister entered the room, and seated himself at the head of the table. All eyes were riveted on him; he was worth going miles to see. He had dressed for the part; his Vandyke beard was exquisitely groomed, his abundant brown hair smoothly brushed. His morning coat and vest, set off by dark striped trousers, beautifully creased and shyly revealing the kind of socks that young men dream about; and shoes to match. He was the perfect picture of the statesman, the leader.

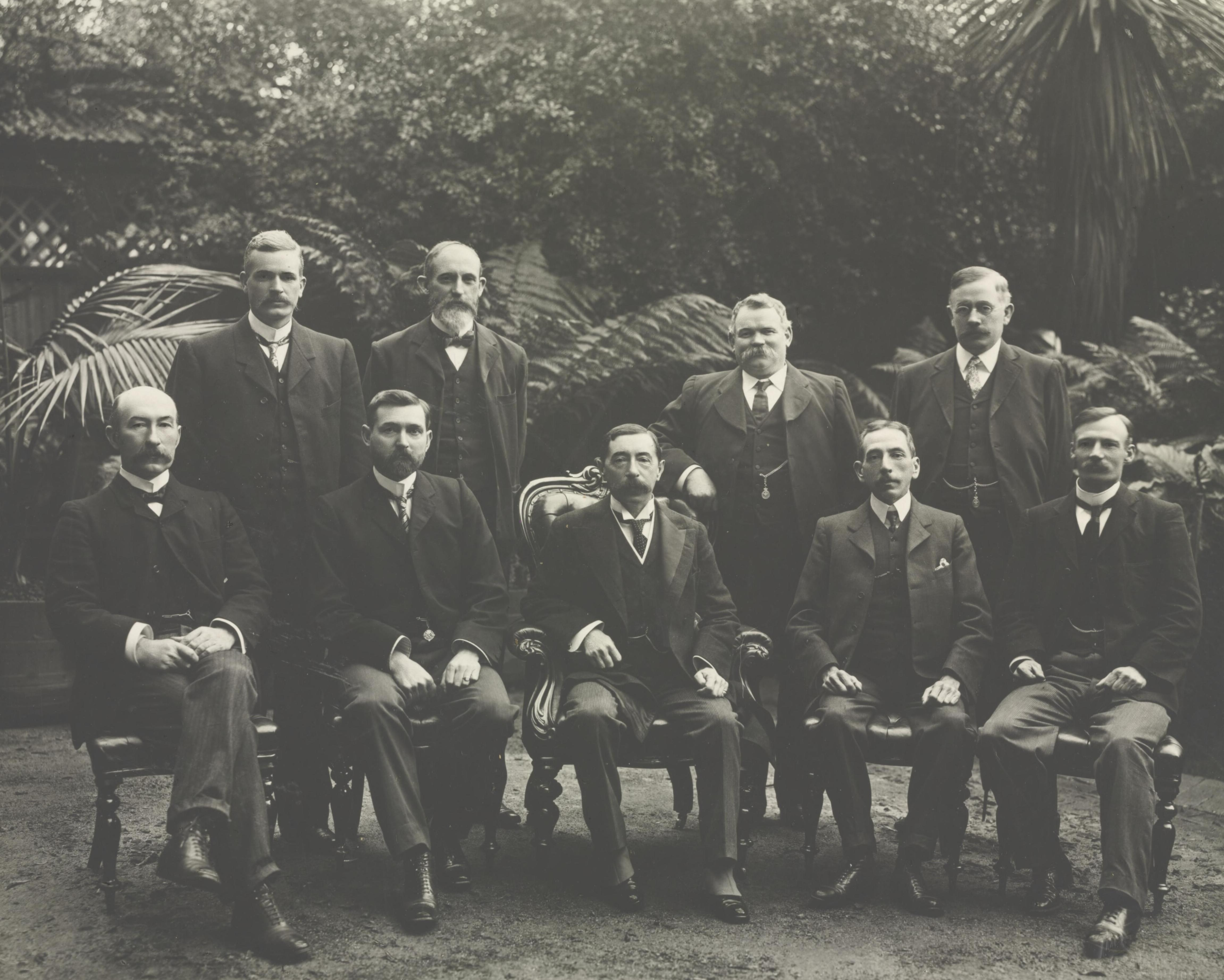
The Watson Ministry, 1904

Despite the apparent fitness of the new prime minister for his role, the government hung on the fine thread of Deakin's promise of 'fair play'. The triumph of the historic first Australian Labour government was a qualified one – Labour did not have the numbers to implement key policies. The 'three elevens' – the lack of a definite majority in the parliament after the second federal election – dogged Watson just as it had Deakin.

Six bills were enacted during Watson's brief government. All but one – an amended Acts Interpretation Act 1904 – were supply bills. The most significant legislative achievement of the Watson government was the advancement of the troublesome Conciliation and Arbitration Bill. Another accomplishment was the appointing of a Royal Commission on a Bill related to Navigation and Shipping, whose report (presented a couple of years later) led to "major redrafting of the Navigation Act" and improvements in conditions for Australian seamen. Once he became the prime minister, Watson recognised the limitations of his position in the Labour caucus and endorsed the concept of a deputy leader. Andrew Fisher won the position by one vote over the more dynamic Billy Hughes.

== Defeat and final years as leader ==
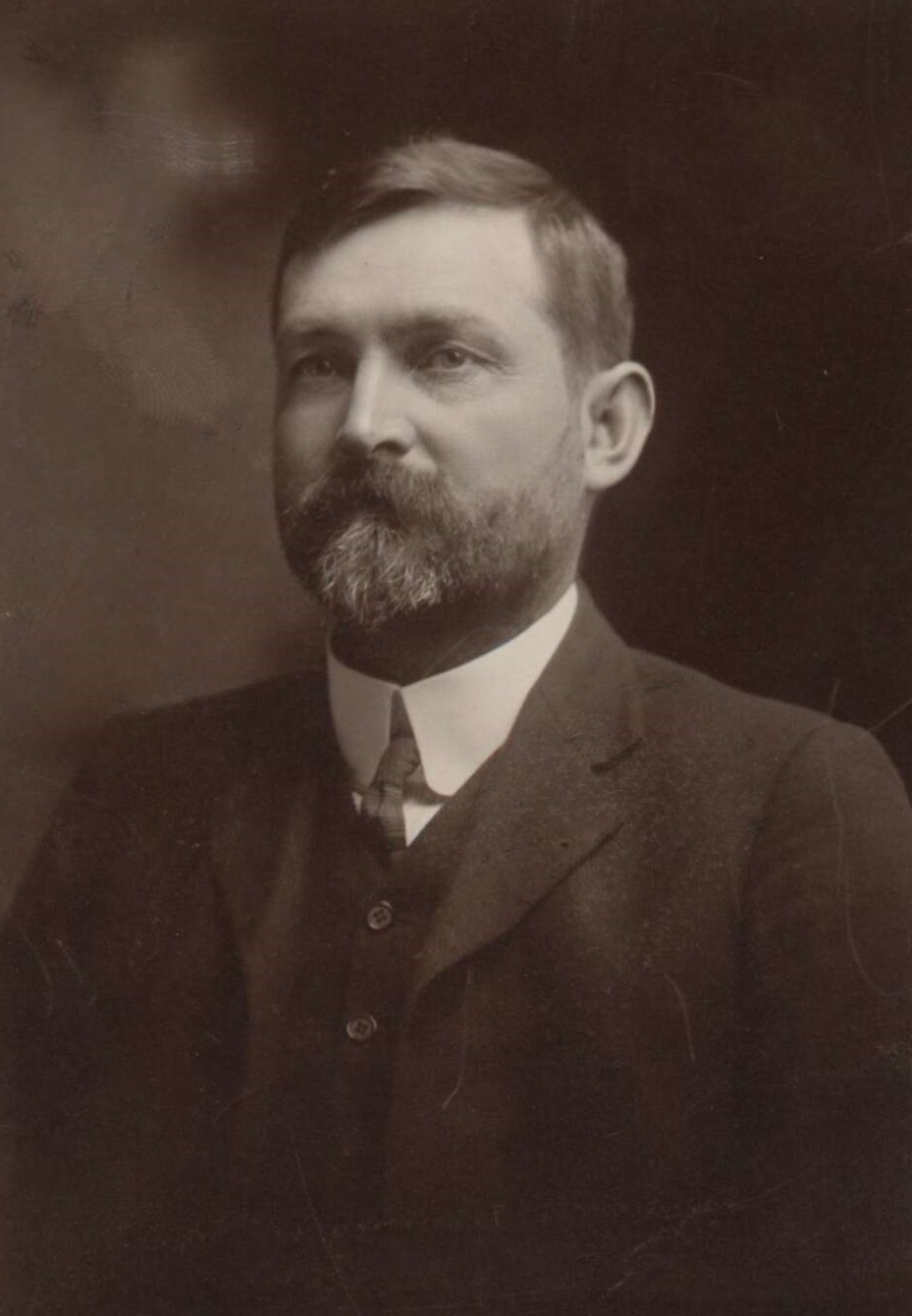
Watson in 1908

Although Watson sought a dissolution of parliament so that an election could be held, the Governor-General Lord Northcote refused. Unable to command a majority in the House of Representatives, Watson resigned the premiership less than four months after taking office, his term ending on 18 August 1904 (Deakin was later defeated on a similar bill). Reid became prime minister and four months later his government managed to pass the Conciliation and Arbitration Bill after compromising to extend the scope to state public servants as Watson had proposed.

Deakin again became prime minister after Reid lost confidence of the parliament in July 1905. Watson led Labour to the 1906 federal election and improved their position again. At this election the seat of Bland was abolished, so he shifted to the seat of South Sydney. From August 1906, Watson was an early influential supporter of Canberra, as the site of the national capital.

Watson resigned as ALP leader on 23 October 1907, aged 40, with caucus minutes attributing the decision to "the severe strain upon his health". He was succeeded as leader by Andrew Fisher following a leadership election.

Watson retired from politics, aged only 42, prior to the 1910 federal election, at which Labour won with 50 percent of the primary vote. It was the first time a party had been elected to majority government in the House of Representatives, it was also the first time a party won a Senate majority, and it was the world's first Labour Party majority government at a national level. The ALP vote had risen rapidly, going from 15 percent against two larger and more established parties in 1901, to 50 percent in 1910, after a majority of the Protectionist Party merged with the Anti-Socialist Party, creating the Commonwealth Liberal Party which received 45 percent.

== Later life ==
=== Political activities ===
In the Australian Labor Party split of 1916, numerous Labor MPs were expelled from the party for supporting World War I conscription in Australia. Watson sided with ex-Labor prime minister Billy Hughes and the conscriptionists and had his party membership terminated as a result. Watson remained active in the affairs of Hughes' Nationalist Party until 1922, but after that he drifted out of politics altogether.

In 1931 he was state president of the Australian Industries Protection League and supported the Scullin government's high-tariff policies.

=== Business activities ===
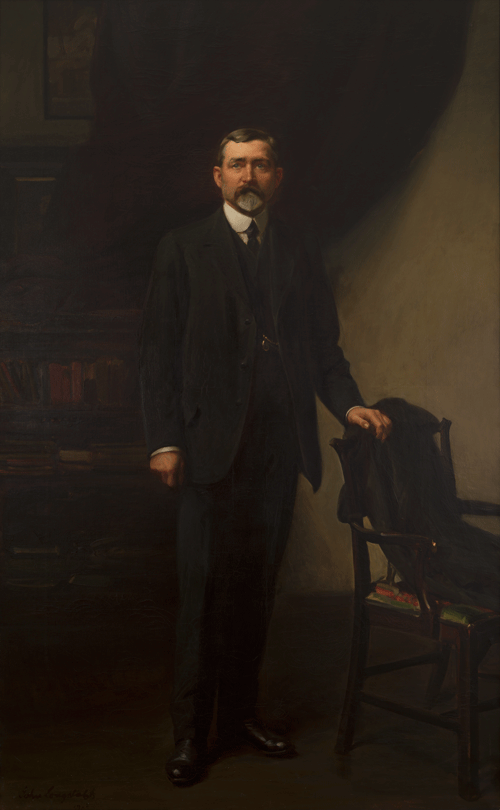
Parliament House portrait of Watson by John Longstaff, 1915

In December 1910, Watson was recruited by a syndicate of Sydney businessmen to lead a gold-seeking expedition in South Africa. He also engaged in land speculation in Sutherland, but development did not occur rapidly enough. He was appointed as a director of Labor Papers Limited, the publisher of the AWU's official newspaper The Australian Worker.

Watson joined the council of the newly established National Roads Association (NRA) in March 1920, and in August was elected as the association's inaugural president. The NRA was intended as a peak body for New South Wales motorists, lobbying the state government to create a Main Roads Board and borrow money to improve local highways. It was initially hampered by its small membership and lack of financial resources, with a budget of only £15 per week. Watson was able to attract publicity through the launch of a magazine and a successful campaign to raise speed limits. He was again chosen as president in 1923 when the NRA was reorganised into the NRMA, and would retain the position for the rest of his life. By the end of the following year the organisation had grown from 550 to 5,000 members. It subsequently expanded into vehicle insurance and motor touring, acquiring a series of properties for camping. As well as his involvement with the NRMA, Watson also was a director of a taxi company, Yellow Cabs of Australia, and as chairman of the state government's Traffic Advisory Committee. In 1936, he became the inaugural chairman of petrol retailer Ampol.

== Personal life ==
Watson's first wife Ada died in 1921. On 30 October 1925 he married Antonia Mary Gladys Dowlan in the same church as his first wedding. She was a 23-year-old waitress from Western Australia whom he had met when she served his table at a Sydney club. In 1927, they had one daughter, Jacqueline Dunn née Watson.

Watson and his second wife moved to a villa in Double Bay in 1934. In retirement he became a keen bridge player and was also a regular attendee at Randwick Racecourse and the Sydney Cricket Ground, serving on the Sydney Cricket Ground Trust. He visited the United States for business reasons and also returned to New Zealand on a number of occasions in a private capacity. After several weeks of ill health, Watson died at his home in Double Bay on 18 November 1941, aged 74. He was granted a state funeral at St Andrew's Cathedral, with Joseph Cook, Albert Gardiner, John Curtin and William McKell serving as pallbearers. His ashes were interred at the Northern Suburbs Crematorium.

== Evaluation and honours ==
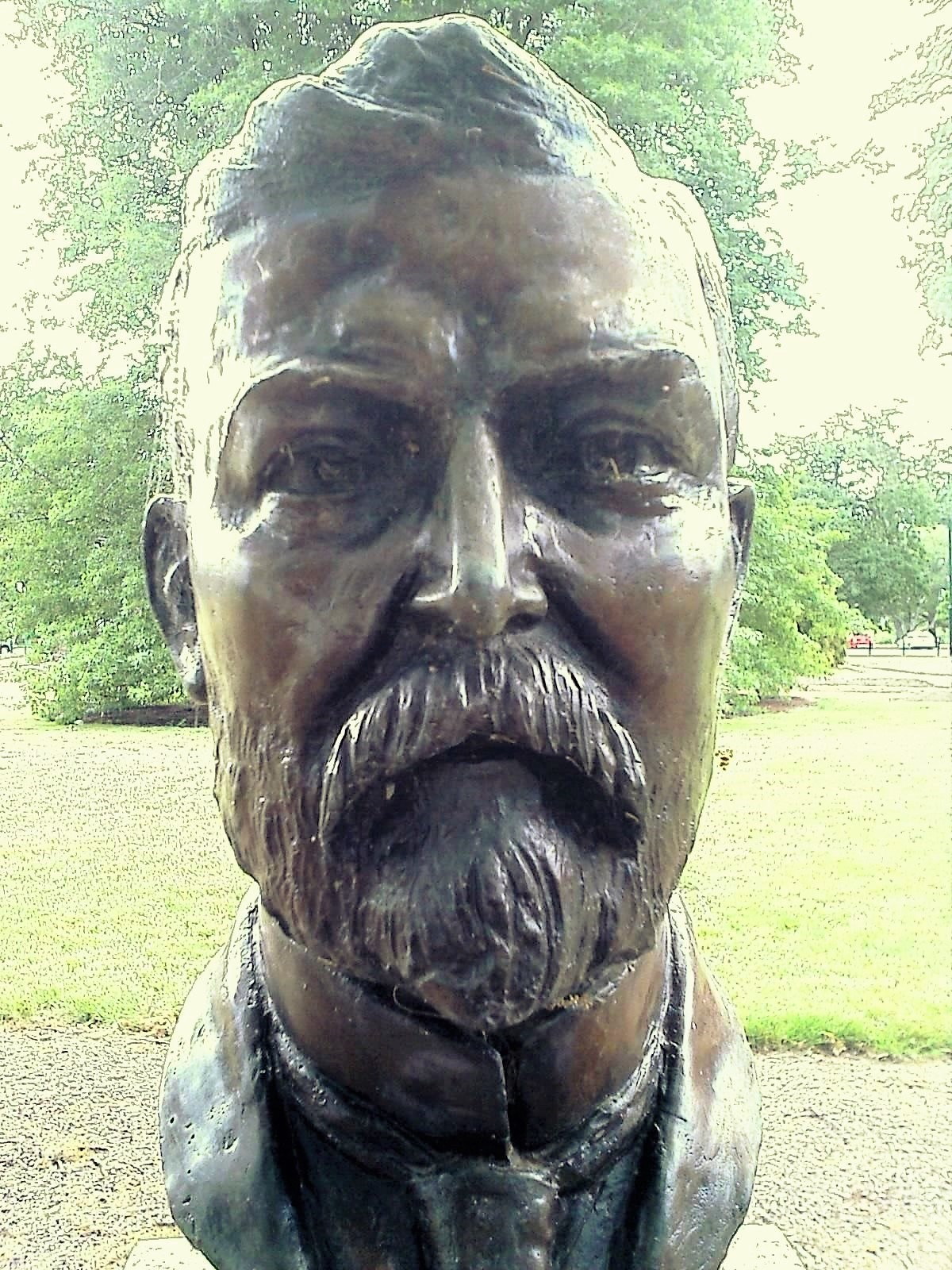
Bust of Chris Watson by sculptor Wallace Anderson located in the Prime Ministers Avenue in the Ballarat Botanical Gardens

According to Percival Serle, Watson "left a much greater impression on his time than this would suggest. He came at the right moment for his party, and nothing could have done it more good than the sincerity, courtesy and moderation which he always showed as a leader". Alfred Deakin wrote of Watson: "The Labour section has much cause for gratitude to Mr Watson, the leader whose tact and judgement have enabled it to achieve many of its Parliamentary successes".

In April 2004 the Labor Party marked the centenary of the Watson government with a series of public events in Canberra and Melbourne, attended by then party leader Mark Latham and former ALP Prime Ministers Gough Whitlam, Bob Hawke and Paul Keating. Watson's daughter, Jacqueline Dunn, 77, was guest of honour at these functions. The Canberra suburb Watson and the federal electorate of Watson are named after him. In 1969 he was honoured on a postage stamp bearing his portrait issued by Australia Post.

== See also ==
- Watson government
- Watson Ministry
- German Chileans

New South Wales Legislative Assembly
Preceded by John Gough; James Mackinnon	Member for Young; 1894–1901	Succeeded by George Burgess
Parliament of Australia
New division	Member for Bland; 1901–1906	Division abolished
Preceded by George Edwards	Member for South Sydney; 1906–1910	Succeeded by Edward Riley
Party political offices
New political party	Leader of the Australian Labor Party; 1901–1907	Succeeded by Andrew Fisher
Political offices
Preceded by Alfred Deakin	Prime Minister of Australia; 1904	Succeeded by George Reid
Preceded by Sir George Turner	Treasurer of Australia; 1904	Succeeded by Sir George Turner
Preceded by George Reid	Leader of the Opposition of Australia; 1904–1905	Succeeded by George Reid
