= Albert Reid =

Australian politician

Albert Reid MC
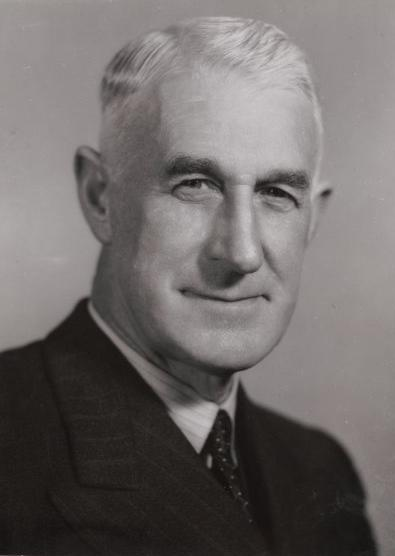

Senator for New South Wales
- In office 22 February 1950 – 22 May 1962

Personal details
- Born: 25 July 1886 Murrumburrah, New South Wales
- Died: 22 May 1962 (aged 75) Concord, New South Wales, Australia
- Party: Australian Country Party
- Occupation: Farmer, grazier

Albert David Reid, MC (25 July 1886 – 22 May 1962) was an Australian politician. Born in Murrumburrah, New South Wales, he was educated at state schools before becoming a farmer and grazier at Crowther. He sat on Murrumburrah Shire Council before serving in the military in 1914. He was awarded the Military Cross for gallantry at Beersheeba in October 1917.

In 1927, he was elected to the New South Wales Legislative Assembly as the Country Party member for Young. He was defeated in 1930 but re-elected in 1932. He was Minister for Agriculture 1938–1941. He was defeated at the 1941 state election by 660 votes. He served with the Australian forces during World War II from 1941 to 1943. In 1949, he was elected to the Australian Senate as a Country Party Senator for New South Wales. He retired in 1961, with the retirement to take effect in 1962, but died while still a Senator; no appointment was made.
