= James Mackinnon (politician) =

Australia politician (1851–1910)

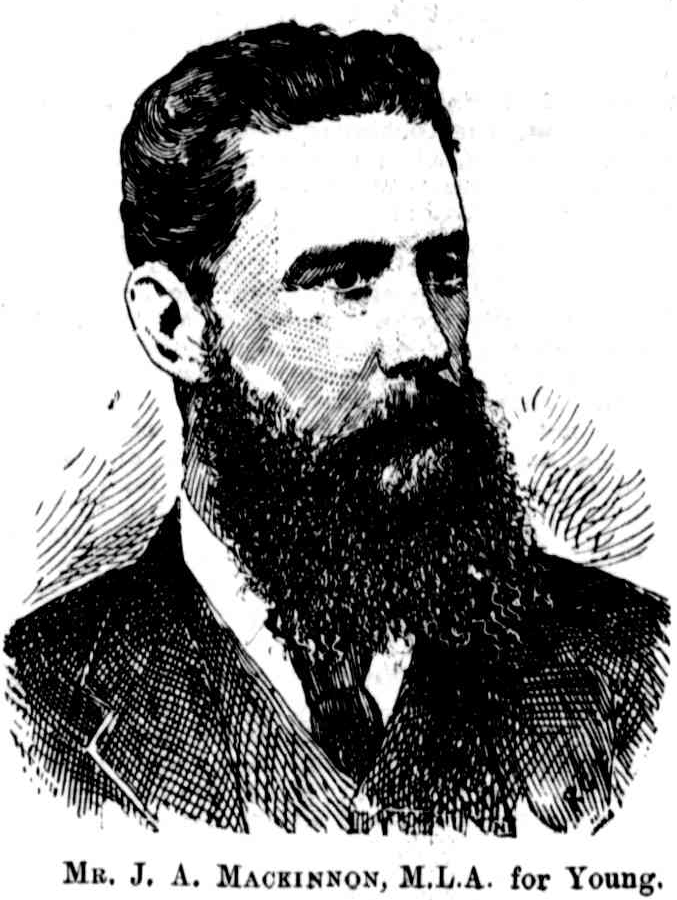

James Archibald Mackinnon (27 September 1851 – 2 September 1910) was a politician and stock and station agent in New South Wales, Australia.

He was born in Benalla and was educated at Scotch College, Melbourne. He worked as a station agent around the Murray River, and eventually owned land around Young. In 1882 he was elected to the New South Wales Legislative Assembly as the member for Young. In 1885 he was defeated by two votes, in a result that was overturned and resulted in Mackinnon resuming his seat. Initially associated with the Protectionists, he joined the Labor Party when it formed in 1891, but refused to sign the pledge and was defeated as a Protectionist in 1894. He later moved to Grenfell, where he died in 1910.

New South Wales Legislative Assembly
Preceded by James Watson; William Watson	Member for Young; 1882–1885; With: Gerald Spring	Succeeded by William Watson
Preceded by William Watson	Member for Young; 1885–1894; With: Spring / Gordon / Gough	Succeeded by Chris Watson
