= Electoral results for the district of Randwick =

Election results for Randwick, New South Wales, Australia

Randwick, an electoral district of the Legislative Assembly in the Australian state of New South Wales, has had two incarnations, the first from 1894 to 1920, the second from 1927 to 1971.

| Election | Member | Party |
|---|---|---|
| 1894 | David Storey | Free Trade |
| 1895 | David Storey | Free Trade |
| 1898 | David Storey | Free Trade |
| 1901 | David Storey | Liberal Reform |
| 1904 | David Storey | Liberal Reform |
| 1907 | David Storey | Liberal Reform |
| 1910 | David Storey | Independent Liberal |
| 1913 | David Storey | Liberal Reform |
| 1917 | David Storey | Nationalist |
| Election | Member | Party |
| 1927 | Jack Flanagan | Labor |
| 1930 | Arthur Moverly | United Australia |
| 1932 | William Gollan | Labor |
| 1935 | William Gollan | Labor |
| 1938 | William Gollan | Labor |
| 1941 | William Gollan | Labor |
| 1944 | William Gollan | Labor |
| 1947 | William Gollan | Labor |
| 1950 | William Gollan | Labor |
| 1953 | William Gollan | Labor |
| 1956 | William Gollan | Labor |
| 1959 | William Gollan | Labor |
| 1962 | Lionel Bowen | Labor |
| 1965 | Lionel Bowen | Labor |
| 1968 | Lionel Bowen | Labor |
| 1970 by | Laurie Brereton | Labor |

== Election results ==
=== Elections in the 1970s ===
==== 1970 by-election ====
1970 Randwick by-election Saturday 14 February
| Party | Candidate | Votes | % | ±% |
|---|---|---|---|---|
| Labor | Laurie Brereton | 13,201 | 61.5 | +8.9 |
| Liberal | John McLaughlin | 8,252 | 38.5 | −5.1 |
| Total formal votes | | 21,453 | 97.3 | +0.5 |
| Informal votes | | 581 | 2.6 | +0.5 |
| Turnout | | 20,034 | 79.5 | −13.3 |
| Labor hold | | Swing | +8.1 | |

Lionel Bowen (Labor) resigned to successfully contest the 1969 election for Kingsford Smith.

=== Elections in the 1960s ===
==== 1968 ====
1968 New South Wales state election: Randwick
| Party | Candidate | Votes | % | ±% |
|---|---|---|---|---|
| Labor | Lionel Bowen | 12,652 | 52.6 | −2.8 |
| Liberal | John McLaughlin | 10,471 | 43.6 | −1.1 |
| Democratic Labor | Cornelius Woodbury | 911 | 3.8 | +3.8 |
| Total formal votes | | 24,034 | 96.8 | |
| Informal votes | | 784 | 3.2 | |
| Turnout | | 24,818 | 92.8 | |
Two-party-preferred result
| Labor | Lionel Bowen | 12,834 | 53.4 | −1.9 |
| Liberal | John McLaughlin | 11,200 | 46.6 | +1.9 |
| Labor hold | | Swing | −1.9 | |

==== 1965 ====
1965 New South Wales state election: Randwick
| Party | Candidate | Votes | % | ±% |
|---|---|---|---|---|
| Labor | Lionel Bowen | 11,953 | 55.4 | +0.2 |
| Liberal | Sidney Pitkethly | 9,644 | 44.6 | +5.2 |
| Total formal votes | | 21,597 | 98.1 | −0.5 |
| Informal votes | | 422 | 1.9 | +0.5 |
| Turnout | | 22,019 | 92.0 | −1.1 |
| Labor hold | | Swing | −1.0 | |

==== 1962 ====
1962 New South Wales state election: Randwick
| Party | Candidate | Votes | % | ±% |
|---|---|---|---|---|
| Labor | Lionel Bowen | 12,300 | 55.2 | −1.4 |
| Liberal | Adrian Molloy | 8,780 | 39.4 | −1.7 |
| Democratic Labor | Charles De Monchaux | 1,215 | 5.4 | +3.0 |
| Total formal votes | | 22,295 | 98.6 | |
| Informal votes | | 326 | 1.4 | |
| Turnout | | 22,621 | 93.1 | |
Two-party-preferred result
| Labor | Lionel Bowen | 12,543 | 56.3 | −0.7 |
| Liberal | Adrian Molloy | 9,752 | 43.7 | +0.7 |
| Labor hold | | Swing | −0.7 | |

=== Elections in the 1950s ===
==== 1959 ====
1959 New South Wales state election: Randwick
| Party | Candidate | Votes | % | ±% |
|---|---|---|---|---|
| Labor | William Gollan | 11,938 | 56.6 | |
| Liberal | Graham Price | 8,667 | 41.1 | |
| Democratic Labor | Cecil Russell | 503 | 2.4 | |
| Total formal votes | | 21,108 | 98.4 | |
| Informal votes | | 340 | 1.6 | |
| Turnout | | 21,448 | 93.5 | |
Two-party-preferred result
| Labor | William Gollan | 12,039 | 57.0 | |
| Liberal | Graham Price | 9,069 | 43.0 | |
| Labor hold | | Swing | | |

==== 1956 ====
1956 New South Wales state election: Randwick
| Party | Candidate | Votes | % | ±% |
|---|---|---|---|---|
| Labor | William Gollan | 10,281 | 52.6 | −11.1 |
| Liberal | Charles De Monchaux | 8,777 | 44.9 | +8.6 |
| Communist | Kenneth O'Hara | 498 | 2.5 | +2.5 |
| Total formal votes | | 19,556 | 98.3 | +0.3 |
| Informal votes | | 411 | 2.0 | −0.3 |
| Turnout | | 19,903 | 93.2 | −0.1 |
Two-party-preferred result
| Labor | William Gollan | 10,729 | 54.9 | −8.8 |
| Liberal | Charles De Monchaux | 8,827 | 45.1 | +8.8 |
| Labor hold | | Swing | −8.8 | |

==== 1953 ====
1953 New South Wales state election: Randwick
| Party | Candidate | Votes | % | ±% |
|---|---|---|---|---|
| Labor | William Gollan | 13,003 | 63.7 | |
| Liberal | George Goodwin | 7,399 | 36.3 | |
| Total formal votes | | 20,402 | 98.0 | |
| Informal votes | | 411 | 2.0 | |
| Turnout | | 20,813 | 93.3 | |
| Labor hold | | Swing | | |

==== 1950 ====
1950 New South Wales state election: Randwick
| Party | Candidate | Votes | % | ±% |
|---|---|---|---|---|
| Labor | William Gollan | 10,847 | 52.9 | |
| Liberal | Gerald Davis | 9,650 | 47.1 | |
| Total formal votes | | 20,497 | 98.2 | |
| Informal votes | | 372 | 1.8 | |
| Turnout | | 20,869 | 92.6 | |
| Labor hold | | Swing | | |

=== Elections in the 1940s ===
==== 1947 ====
1947 New South Wales state election: Randwick
| Party | Candidate | Votes | % | ±% |
|---|---|---|---|---|
| Labor | William Gollan | 13,014 | 57.2 | −1.8 |
| Liberal | Thomas Murphy | 9,757 | 42.8 | +14.4 |
| Total formal votes | | 22,771 | 98.1 | +1.9 |
| Informal votes | | 440 | 1.9 | −1.9 |
| Turnout | | 23,211 | 93.8 | +0.7 |
| Labor hold | | Swing | N/A | |

==== 1944 ====
1944 New South Wales state election: Randwick
| Party | Candidate | Votes | % | ±% |
|---|---|---|---|---|
| Labor | William Gollan | 12,592 | 59.0 | +8.0 |
| Democratic | Bertram Butcher | 6,060 | 28.4 | −12.9 |
| Liberal Democratic | Arnold Baker | 2,693 | 12.6 | +12.6 |
| Total formal votes | | 21,345 | 96.2 | −2.2 |
| Informal votes | | 846 | 3.8 | +2.2 |
| Turnout | | 22,191 | 93.1 | +0.6 |
| Labor hold | | Swing | N/A | |

- Preferences were not distributed.

==== 1941 ====
1941 New South Wales state election: Randwick
| Party | Candidate | Votes | % | ±% |
|---|---|---|---|---|
| Labor | William Gollan | 10,537 | 51.0 | |
| United Australia | Arthur Moverly | 8,547 | 41.3 | |
| State Labor | Sam Lewis | 1,591 | 7.7 | |
| Total formal votes | | 20,675 | 98.4 | |
| Informal votes | | 331 | 1.6 | |
| Turnout | | 21,006 | 92.5 | |
| Labor gain from United Australia | | Swing | | |

- Preferences were not distributed.

=== Elections in the 1930s ===
==== 1938 ====
1938 New South Wales state election: Randwick
| Party | Candidate | Votes | % | ±% |
|---|---|---|---|---|
| United Australia | Arthur Moverly | 11,100 | 56.0 | +3.1 |
| Labor | Bob O'Halloran | 8,719 | 44.0 | +1.0 |
| Total formal votes | | 19,819 | 98.3 | −0.1 |
| Informal votes | | 332 | 1.7 | +0.1 |
| Turnout | | 20,151 | 95.8 | −0.9 |
| United Australia hold | | Swing | N/A | |

==== 1935 ====
1935 New South Wales state election: Randwick
| Party | Candidate | Votes | % | ±% |
|---|---|---|---|---|
| United Australia | Arthur Moverly | 9,892 | 52.9 | +0.5 |
| Labor (NSW) | Jack Flanagan | 8,029 | 43.0 | +1.1 |
| Federal Labor | John Taylor | 772 | 4.1 | −1.6 |
| Total formal votes | | 18,693 | 98.4 | −0.6 |
| Informal votes | | 296 | 1.6 | +0.6 |
| Turnout | | 18,989 | 96.7 | +0.7 |
| United Australia hold | | Swing | N/A | |

- Preferences were not distributed.

==== 1932 ====
1932 New South Wales state election: Randwick
| Party | Candidate | Votes | % | ±% |
|---|---|---|---|---|
| United Australia | Arthur Moverly | 9,622 | 52.4 | +16.9 |
| Labor (NSW) | Jack Flanagan | 7,696 | 41.9 | −16.0 |
| Federal Labor | Francis Pollard | 1,042 | 5.7 | +5.7 |
| Total formal votes | | 18,360 | 99.0 | +0.4 |
| Informal votes | | 183 | 1.0 | −0.4 |
| Turnout | | 18,543 | 96.0 | +4.4 |
| United Australia gain from Labor (NSW) | | Swing | N/A | |

- Preferences were not distributed.

==== 1930 ====
1930 New South Wales state election: Randwick
| Party | Candidate | Votes | % | ±% |
|---|---|---|---|---|
| Labor | Jack Flanagan | 10,243 | 57.9 | |
| Nationalist | Ernest Tresidder (defeated) | 6,283 | 35.5 | |
| Australian | Harold Smith | 1,169 | 6.6 | |
| Total formal votes | | 17,695 | 98.6 | |
| Informal votes | | 252 | 1.4 | |
| Turnout | | 17,947 | 91.6 | |
| Labor gain from Nationalist | | Swing | | |

=== Elections in the 1920s ===
==== 1927 ====
1927 New South Wales state election: Randwick
| Party | Candidate | Votes | % | ±% |
|---|---|---|---|---|
| Nationalist | Ernest Tresider | 7,957 | 54.1 | |
| Labor | Jack Flanagan | 6,739 | 45.9 | |
| Total formal votes | | 14,696 | 98.7 | |
| Informal votes | | 191 | 1.3 | |
| Turnout | | 14,887 | 82.3 | |
| Nationalist win | | (new seat) | | |

District re-created

==== 1920 - 1927 ====
District abolished District abolished

=== Elections in the 1910s ===
==== 1917 ====
1917 New South Wales state election: Randwick
| Party | Candidate | Votes | % | ±% |
|---|---|---|---|---|
| Nationalist | David Storey | 7,340 | 60.1 | +1.8 |
| Labor | Bob O'Halloran | 4,879 | 39.9 | +1.6 |
| Total formal votes | | 12,219 | 99.0 | +2.1 |
| Informal votes | | 127 | 1.0 | −2.1 |
| Turnout | | 12,346 | 59.8 | +2.8 |
| Nationalist hold | | Swing | +1.8 | |

==== 1913 ====
1913 New South Wales state election: Randwick
| Party | Candidate | Votes | % | ±% |
|---|---|---|---|---|
| Liberal Reform | David Storey | 4,689 | 58.3 | |
| Labor | William Brown | 3,078 | 38.3 | |
| Independent | William Melville | 278 | 3.5 | |
| Total formal votes | | 8,045 | 96.9 | |
| Informal votes | | 255 | 3.1 | |
| Turnout | | 8,300 | 57.0 | |
| Member changed to Liberal Reform from Independent Liberal | | | | |

==== 1910 ====
1910 New South Wales state election: Randwick
| Party | Candidate | Votes | % | ±% |
|---|---|---|---|---|
| Independent Liberal | David Storey | 4,998 | 59.4 | −16.6 |
| Labour | William Brown | 3,413 | 40.6 | +16.6 |
| Total formal votes | | 8,411 | 98.1 | +1.6 |
| Informal votes | | 162 | 1.9 | −1.6 |
| Turnout | | 8,573 | 67.4 | +16.0 |
| Member changed to Independent Liberal from Liberal Reform | | | | |

=== Elections in the 1900s ===
==== 1907 ====
1907 New South Wales state election: Randwick
| Party | Candidate | Votes | % | ±% |
|---|---|---|---|---|
| Liberal Reform | David Storey | 3,499 | 76.0 | |
| Labour | John Browne | 1,104 | 24.0 | |
| Total formal votes | | 4,603 | 96.5 | |
| Informal votes | | 168 | 3.5 | |
| Turnout | | 4,771 | 51.4 | |
| Liberal Reform hold | | | | |

==== 1904 ====
1904 New South Wales state election: Randwick
| Party | Candidate | Votes | % | ±% |
|---|---|---|---|---|
| Liberal Reform | David Storey | 2,235 | 75.7 | |
| Independent | James O'Donnell | 488 | 16.5 | |
| Progressive | Thomas Armfield | 134 | 4.5 | |
| Independent | Samuel Kennedy | 87 | 3.0 | |
| Total formal votes | | 2,954 | 99.3 | |
| Informal votes | | 22 | 0.7 | |
| Turnout | | 2,976 | 39.6 | |
| Liberal Reform hold | | | | |

Randwick lost parts of the district to Paddington, Surry Hills and Waverley and was expanded to include parts of Botany and Waverley. The member for Randwick was David Storey (Liberal Reform). The member for Botany was John Dacey (Labour) who successfully contested Alexandria. The member for Waverley was Thomas Jessep (Liberal Reform) who successfully contested that seat.

==== 1901 ====
1901 New South Wales state election: Randwick
| Party | Candidate | Votes | % | ±% |
|---|---|---|---|---|
| Liberal Reform | David Storey | 1,367 | 72.4 | +21.4 |
| Progressive | James O'Donnell | 508 | 26.9 | −22.1 |
| Independent | Thomas Armfield | 13 | 0.7 | |
| Total formal votes | | 1,888 | 98.3 | −1.4 |
| Informal votes | | 33 | 1.7 | +1.4 |
| Turnout | | 1,921 | 53.3 | −7.6 |
| Liberal Reform hold | | | | |

=== Elections in the 1890s ===
==== 1898 ====
1898 New South Wales colonial election: Randwick
| Party | Candidate | Votes | % | ±% |
|---|---|---|---|---|
| Free Trade | David Storey | 865 | 51.0 | |
| National Federal | George Raffan | 831 | 49.0 | |
| Total formal votes | | 1,696 | 99.7 | |
| Informal votes | | 5 | 0.3 | |
| Turnout | | 1,701 | 60.9 | |
| Free Trade hold | | | | |

==== 1895 ====
1895 New South Wales colonial election: Randwick
| Party | Candidate | Votes | % | ±% |
|---|---|---|---|---|
| Free Trade | David Storey | 796 | 59.2 | |
| Independent | Alexander Wilson | 430 | 32.0 | |
| Protectionist | Thomas Tuck | 119 | 8.9 | |
| Total formal votes | | 1,345 | 99.4 | |
| Informal votes | | 8 | 0.6 | |
| Turnout | | 1,353 | 57.6 | |
| Free Trade hold | | | | |

==== 1894 ====
1894 New South Wales colonial election: Randwick
| Party | Candidate | Votes | % | ±% |
|---|---|---|---|---|
| Free Trade | David Storey | 825 | 40.9 | |
| Protectionist | Edmund Barton | 486 | 24.1 | |
| Labour | George Stevenson | 333 | 16.5 | |
| Ind. Protectionist | Michael Kinnane | 302 | 15.0 | |
| Ind. Free Trade | Richard Colonna-Close | 71 | 3.5 | |
| Total formal votes | | 2,017 | 99.2 | |
| Informal votes | | 16 | 0.8 | |
| Turnout | | 2,033 | 84.2 | |
| Free Trade win | | (new seat) | | |
