= Electoral results for the Division of Watson (1934–1969) =

Australian division election results

This is a list of electoral results for the Division of Watson (1934–69) in Australian federal elections from the division's creation in 1934 until its abolition in 1969.

== Members ==
Member	Party	Term
John Jennings	United Australia	1934–1940
Max Falstein	Labor	1940–1949
Max Falstein	Independent Labor	1949–1949
Dan Curtin	Labor	1949–1955
Jim Cope	Labor	1955–1969

== Election results ==
=== Elections in the 1960s ===
==== 1966 ====
1966 Australian federal election: Watson
Party	Candidate	Votes	%	±%
Labor	Jim Cope	21,492	62.1	−6.0
Liberal	Peter Lowe	10,476	30.2	+6.9
Democratic Labor	Thomas Colman	2,664	7.7	+1.7
Total formal votes		34,632	95.6	
Informal votes		1,608	4.4	
Turnout		36,240	94.0	
Two-party-preferred result
Labor	Jim Cope		64.4	−8.1
Liberal	Peter Lowe		35.6	+8.1
Labor hold		Swing	−8.1	

==== 1963 ====
1963 Australian federal election: Watson
Party	Candidate	Votes	%	±%
Labor	Jim Cope	24,280	68.1	−12.0
Liberal	Louis Mamo	8,302	23.3	+6.4
Democratic Labor	Bernard Atkinson	2,136	6.0	+3.0
Communist	Harry Hatfield	951	2.7	+2.7
Total formal votes		35,669	96.9	
Informal votes		1,143	3.1	
Turnout		36,812	93.9	
Two-party-preferred result
Labor	Jim Cope		72.5	−8.2
Liberal	Louis Mamo		27.5	+8.2
Labor hold		Swing	−8.2	

==== 1961 ====
1961 Australian federal election: Watson
Party	Candidate	Votes	%	±%
Labor	Jim Cope	29,079	80.1	+9.1
Liberal	Sidney Pitkethly	6,134	16.9	−8.2
Democratic Labor	Mary Nappa	1,081	3.0	−0.9
Total formal votes		36,294	97.0	
Informal votes		1,141	3.0	
Turnout		37,435	94.7	
Two-party-preferred result
Labor	Jim Cope		80.7	+8.9
Liberal	Sidney Pitkethly		19.3	−8.9
Labor hold		Swing	+8.9	

=== Elections in the 1950s ===
==== 1958 ====
1958 Australian federal election: Watson
Party	Candidate	Votes	%	±%
Labor	Jim Cope	27,232	71.0	−3.4
Liberal	John Bampton	9,628	25.1	+4.6
Democratic Labor	Kenneth Collins	1,503	3.9	+3.9
Total formal votes		38,363	96.5	
Informal votes		1,397	3.5	
Turnout		39,760	95.5	
Two-party-preferred result
Labor	Jim Cope		71.8	−7.1
Liberal	John Bampton		28.2	+7.1
Labor hold		Swing	−7.1	

==== 1955 ====
1955 Australian federal election: Watson
Party	Candidate	Votes	%	±%
Labor	Jim Cope	30,129	74.4	−3.8
Liberal	Jill Huxtable	8,316	20.5	+2.1
Communist	Harry Hatfield	2,025	5.0	+2.4
Total formal votes		40,470	96.1	
Informal votes		1,649	3.9	
Turnout		42,119	95.4	
Two-party-preferred result
Labor	Jim Cope		78.9	−2.1
Liberal	Jill Huxtable		21.1	+2.1
Labor hold		Swing	−2.1	

==== 1954 ====
1954 Australian federal election: Watson
Party	Candidate	Votes	%	±%
Labor	Dan Curtin	25,507	63.2	+6.5
Liberal	Hubert O'Connell	14,846	36.8	−6.5
Total formal votes		40,353	98.2	
Informal votes		728	1.8	
Turnout		41,081	96.2	
Labor hold		Swing	+6.5	

==== 1951 ====
1951 Australian federal election: Watson
Party	Candidate	Votes	%	±%
Labor	Dan Curtin	22,510	56.7	+7.3
Liberal	Donald Clark	17,158	43.3	+5.0
Total formal votes		39,668	97.4	
Informal votes		1,051	2.6	
Turnout		40,719	95.6	
Labor hold		Swing	−2.3	

=== Elections in the 1940s ===
==== 1949 ====
1949 Australian federal election: Watson
Party	Candidate	Votes	%	±%
Labor	Dan Curtin	19,515	49.4	−5.9
Liberal	Stanley Card	15,147	38.3	+12.5
Independent Labor	Max Falstein	3,656	9.2	+9.2
Lang Labor	Harold O'Reilly	1,210	3.1	−3.1
Total formal votes		39,528	97.3	
Informal votes		1,079	2.7	
Turnout		40,607	96.5	
Two-party-preferred result
Labor	Dan Curtin		59.0	−3.5
Liberal	Stanley Card		41.0	+3.5
Labor hold		Swing	−3.5	

==== 1946 ====
1946 Australian federal election: Watson
Party	Candidate	Votes	%	±%
Labor	Max Falstein	38,025	53.7	+1.4
Liberal	Charles de Monchaux	24,246	34.2	+6.7
Protestant People	Charles Wilson	6,177	8.7	+8.7
Services	Wallace Knox	2,364	3.3	+3.3
Total formal votes		70,812	97.5	
Informal votes		1,809	2.5	
Turnout		72,621	94.8	
Two-party-preferred result
Labor	Max Falstein		56.7	−5.4
Liberal	Charles de Monchaux		45.3	+5.4
Labor hold		Swing	−5.4	

==== 1943 ====
1943 Australian federal election: Watson
Party	Candidate	Votes	%	±%
Labor	Max Falstein	35,400	52.3	+18.0
United Australia	Norman Whitfield	18,588	27.5	−17.5
State Labor	Richard Wilson	5,662	8.4	−1.2
Ind. United Australia	Les Fingleton	2,304	3.4	+3.4
Liberal Democratic	Arthur Dudley	2,218	3.3	+3.3
Independent	Harry Yates	1,942	2.9	+2.9
Ind. United Australia	Hubert O'Connell	1,579	2.3	+2.3
Total formal votes		67,693	95.9	
Informal votes		2,873	4.1	
Turnout		70,566	98.0	
Two-party-preferred result
Labor	Max Falstein		62.1	+10.1
United Australia	Norman Whitfield		37.9	−10.1
Labor hold		Swing	+10.1	

==== 1940 ====
1940 Australian federal election: Watson
Party	Candidate	Votes	%	±%
United Australia	John Jennings	27,586	45.0	−8.8
Labor	Max Falstein	21,101	34.5	−11.7
Labor (N-C)	Cecil Irwin	6,693	10.9	+10.9
State Labor	Richard Wilson	5,868	9.6	+9.6
Total formal votes		61,248	97.9	
Informal votes		1,290	2.1	
Turnout		62,538	94.7	
Two-party-preferred result
Labor	Max Falstein	31,831	52.0	+5.8
United Australia	John Jennings	29,417	48.0	−5.8
Labor gain from United Australia		Swing	+5.8	

=== Elections in the 1930s ===
==== 1937 ====
1937 Australian federal election: Watson
Party	Candidate	Votes	%	±%
United Australia	John Jennings	31,187	53.8	−1.1
Labor	William Dignam	26,788	46.2	+39.7
Total formal votes		57,975	98.0	
Informal votes		1,157	2.0	
Turnout		59,132	96.5	
United Australia hold		Swing	−4.9	

==== 1934 ====
1934 Australian federal election: Watson
Party	Candidate	Votes	%	±%
United Australia	John Jennings	28,758	54.9	−1.4
Labor (NSW)	Joe Lamaro	17,817	34.0	+13.4
Labor	William Murphy	3,398	6.5	−10.9
Social Credit	Vincent Murtagh	2,371	4.5	+4.5
Total formal votes		52,344	97.1	
Informal votes		1,537	2.9	
Turnout		53,881	95.4	
Two-party-preferred result
United Australia	John Jennings		58.7	−5.8
Labor (NSW)	Joe Lamaro		41.3	+5.8
United Australia notional hold		Swing	−5.8	
