= Electoral results for the Division of South Sydney =

Australian division election results

This is a list of electoral results for the Division of South Sydney in Australian federal elections from the division's creation in 1901 until its abolition in 1934.

== Members ==
Member	Party	Term
George Edwards	Free Trade	1901–1906
Chris Watson	Labour	1906–1910
Edward Riley	Labor	1910–1931
John Jennings	United Australia	1931–1934

== Election results ==
=== Elections in the 1930s ===
==== 1931 ====
1931 Australian federal election: South Sydney
Party	Candidate	Votes	%	±%
United Australia	John Jennings	26,711	49.2	+15.5
Labor (NSW)	John Stewart	17,071	31.4	+31.4
Labor	Edward Riley	10,512	19.4	−34.9
Total formal votes		54,294	97.5	
Informal votes		1,365	2.5	
Turnout		55,659	92.6	
Two-party-preferred result
United Australia	John Jennings	29,897	55.1	+21.4
Labor (NSW)	John Stewart	24,397	44.9	+44.9
United Australia gain from Labor		Swing	+21.4	

=== Elections in the 1920s ===
==== 1929 ====
1929 Australian federal election: South Sydney
Party	Candidate	Votes	%	±%
Labor	Edward Riley	34,978	66.3	+12.1
Nationalist	William Adkins	17,782	33.7	−12.1
Total formal votes		52,760	96.9	
Informal votes		1,696	3.1	
Turnout		54,456	92.8	
Labor hold		Swing	+12.1	

==== 1928 ====
1928 Australian federal election: South Sydney
Party	Candidate	Votes	%	±%
Labor	Edward Riley	25,915	54.2	+3.1
Nationalist	George Baker	21,874	45.8	−3.1
Total formal votes		47,789	95.4	
Informal votes		2,297	4.6	
Turnout		50,086	89.9	
Labor hold		Swing	+3.1	

==== 1925 ====
1925 Australian federal election: South Sydney
Party	Candidate	Votes	%	±%
Labor	Edward Riley	22,393	51.1	−7.8
Nationalist	George Baker	21,411	48.9	+12.4
Total formal votes		43,804	98.6	
Informal votes		622	1.4	
Turnout		44,426	86.3	
Labor hold		Swing	−10.6	

==== 1922 ====
1922 Australian federal election: South Sydney
Party	Candidate	Votes	%	±%
Labor	Edward Riley	10,902	58.9	+2.4
Nationalist	Robert Moore	6,752	36.5	−7.0
Majority Labor	Vivian Deacon	870	4.7	+4.7
Total formal votes		18,524	94.9	
Informal votes		998	5.1	
Turnout		19,522	46.2	
Two-party-preferred result
Labor	Edward Riley		61.7	+5.2
Nationalist	Robert Moore		38.3	−5.2
Labor hold		Swing	+5.2	

=== Elections in the 1910s ===
==== 1919 ====
1919 Australian federal election: South Sydney
Party	Candidate	Votes	%	±%
Labor	Edward Riley	17,521	68.3	+5.0
Nationalist	Frederick Sykes	8,123	31.7	−5.0
Total formal votes		25,644	97.9	
Informal votes		559	2.1	
Turnout		26,203	59.9	
Labor hold		Swing	+5.0	

==== 1917 ====
1917 Australian federal election: South Sydney
Party	Candidate	Votes	%	±%
Labor	Edward Riley	17,056	63.3	−5.5
Nationalist	Alick Kay	9,898	36.7	−5.5
Total formal votes		26,954	96.0	
Informal votes		1,112	4.0	
Turnout		28,066	65.8	
Labor hold		Swing	−5.5	

==== 1914 ====
1914 Australian federal election: South Sydney
Party	Candidate	Votes	%	±%
Labor	Edward Riley	15,792	68.8	+3.8
Liberal	George Pitt	7,157	31.2	−3.8
Total formal votes		22,949	97.1	
Informal votes		680	2.9	
Turnout		23,629	52.8	
Labor hold		Swing	+3.8	

==== 1913 ====
1913 Australian federal election: South Sydney
Party	Candidate	Votes	%	±%
Labor	Edward Riley	17,584	65.0	−4.3
Liberal	Douglas Cooper	9,489	35.0	+4.3
Total formal votes		27,073	97.3	
Informal votes		750	2.7	
Turnout		27,823	66.4	
Labor hold		Swing	−4.3	

==== 1910 ====
1910 Australian federal election: South Sydney
Party	Candidate	Votes	%	±%
Labour	Edward Riley	12,875	74.1	+17.7
Liberal	Eden George	4,509	25.9	−17.7
Total formal votes		17,384	98.0	
Informal votes		361	2.0	
Turnout		17,745	56.6	
Labour hold		Swing	+17.7	

=== Elections in the 1900s ===
==== 1906 ====
1906 Australian federal election: South Sydney
Party	Candidate	Votes	%	±%
Labour	Chris Watson	10,347	56.4	+12.4
Anti-Socialist	James Graham	8,006	43.6	−12.4
Total formal votes		18,353	97.5	
Informal votes		479	2.5	
Turnout		18,832	63.9	
Labour gain from Anti-Socialist		Swing	+12.4	

==== 1903 ====
1903 Australian federal election: South Sydney
Party	Candidate	Votes	%	±%
Free Trade	George Edwards	9,662	56.0	+14.6
Labour	Edward Riley	7,596	44.0	+6.0
Total formal votes		17,258	97.1	
Informal votes		511	2.9	
Turnout		17,769	55.9	
Free Trade hold		Swing	+4.3	

==== 1901 ====
1901 Australian federal election: South Sydney
Party	Candidate	Votes	%	±%
Free Trade	George Edwards	4,693	41.4	+41.4
Labour	James McGowen	4,314	38.0	+38.0
Ind. Protectionist	Henry Hoyle	2,334	20.6	+20.6
Total formal votes		11,341	98.2	
Informal votes		203	1.8	
Turnout		11,544	73.2	
Free Trade win		(new seat)		
