= 1970 Randwick state by-election =

Election result for Randwick, New South Wales, Australia

A by-election was held for the New South Wales Legislative Assembly seat of Randwick on 14 February 1970. It was triggered by the resignation of sitting member Lionel Bowen (Labor) to successfully contest the federal seat of Kingsford Smith at the 1969 election.

== Dates ==
Date	Event
18 September 1969	Resignation of Lionel Bowen.
25 October 1969	1969 Australian federal election
19 January 1970	Writ of election issued by the Speaker of the Legislative Assembly and close of electoral rolls.
23 January 1970	Day of nomination
14 February 1970	Polling day
10 March 1970	Return of writ

== Result ==
1970 Randwick by-election Saturday 14 February
Party	Candidate	Votes	%	±%
Labor	Laurie Brereton	13,201	61.5	+8.9
Liberal	John McLaughlin	8,252	38.5	−5.1
Total formal votes		21,453	97.3	+0.5
Informal votes		581	2.6	+0.5
Turnout		20,034	79.5	−13.3
Labor hold		Swing	+8.1	

== See also ==
- Electoral results for the district of Randwick
- List of New South Wales state by-elections
