= Electoral results for the Division of Kingsford Smith =

Australian division election results

This is a list of electoral results for the Division of Kingsford Smith in Australian federal elections from the division's creation in 1949 until the present.

== Members ==
Member	Party	Term
Gordon Anderson	Labor	1949–1955
Dan Curtin	Labor	1955–1969
Lionel Bowen	Labor	1969–1990
Laurie Brereton	Labor	1990–2004
Peter Garrett	Labor	2004–2013
Matt Thistlethwaite	Labor	2013–present

== Election results ==
=== Elections in the 2020s ===
==== 2025 ====
2025 Australian federal election: Kingsford Smith
Party	Candidate	Votes	%	±%
Labor	Matt Thistlethwaite	50,346	50.79	+3.45
Liberal	Brad Cole	25,924	26.15	−3.46
Greens	Keiron Brown	13,440	13.56	−2.20
One Nation	Mark Jelic	5,865	5.92	+2.44
Independent	Elsa Parker	3,557	3.59	+3.59
Total formal votes		99,132	94.18	−1.05
Informal votes		6,126	5.82	+1.05
Turnout		105,258	89.66	+0.22
Two-party-preferred result
Labor	Matt Thistlethwaite	66,604	67.19	+3.88
Liberal	Brad Cole	32,528	32.81	−3.88
Labor hold		Swing	+3.88	

==== 2022 ====
2022 Australian federal election: Kingsford Smith
Party	Candidate	Votes	%	±%
Labor	Matt Thistlethwaite	46,697	47.91	+2.74
Liberal	Grace Tan	27,929	28.66	−7.77
Greens	Stuart Davis	16,401	16.83	+4.73
United Australia	Anthony Tawaf	3,388	3.48	+1.73
One Nation	Darrin Marr	3,051	3.13	+3.13
Total formal votes		97,466	95.52	+1.31
Informal votes		4,572	4.48	−1.31
Turnout		102,038	88.50	−1.67
Two-party-preferred result
Labor	Matt Thistlethwaite	62,868	64.50	+5.69
Liberal	Grace Tan	34,598	35.50	−5.69
Labor hold		Swing	+5.69	

Alluvial diagram for preference flows in the seat of Kingsford Smith in the 2022 federal election. indicates at what stage the winning candidate had over 50% of the votes and was declared the winner.

=== Elections in the 2010s ===
==== 2019 ====
2019 Australian federal election: Kingsford Smith
Party	Candidate	Votes	%	±%
Labor	Matt Thistlethwaite	42,629	45.17	−2.20
Liberal	Amanda Wilmot	34,380	36.43	−1.11
Greens	James Cruz	11,418	12.10	+1.57
United Australia	Adam Watson	1,649	1.75	+1.75
Science	James Jansson	1,595	1.69	−0.54
Christian Democrats	Adrian Manson	1,359	1.44	−0.89
Sustainable Australia	Petra Campbell	1,346	1.43	+1.43
Total formal votes		94,376	94.21	−0.79
Informal votes		5,805	5.79	+0.79
Turnout		100,181	90.17	+0.93
Two-party-preferred result
Labor	Matt Thistlethwaite	55,501	58.81	+0.24
Liberal	Amanda Wilmot	38,875	41.19	−0.24
Labor hold		Swing	+0.24	

==== 2016 ====
2016 Australian federal election: Kingsford Smith
Party	Candidate	Votes	%	±%
Labor	Matt Thistlethwaite	43,642	47.37	+5.35
Liberal	Michael Feneley	34,591	37.54	−5.96
Greens	James Macdonald	9,698	10.53	+0.74
Christian Democrats	Andrew Weatherstone	2,144	2.33	+0.73
Science	Andrea Leong	2,059	2.23	+1.43
Total formal votes		92,134	95.00	+3.63
Informal votes		4,849	5.00	−3.63
Turnout		96,983	89.24	−2.53
Two-party-preferred result
Labor	Matt Thistlethwaite	53,962	58.57	+5.83
Liberal	Michael Feneley	38,172	41.43	−5.83
Labor hold		Swing	+5.83	

==== 2013 ====
2013 Australian federal election: Kingsford Smith
Party	Candidate	Votes	%	±%
Liberal	Michael Feneley	37,455	43.50	+2.25
Labor	Matt Thistlethwaite	36,177	42.02	−1.81
Greens	James Macdonald	8,431	9.79	−2.26
Palmer United	Diane Happ	1,611	1.87	+1.87
Christian Democrats	Jacquie Shiha	1,379	1.60	+1.60
Future	Geordie Lucas	693	0.80	+0.80
Rise Up Australia	Danielle Somerfield	357	0.41	+0.41
Total formal votes		86,103	91.37	−0.48
Informal votes		8,130	8.63	+0.48
Turnout		94,233	92.01	+0.63
Two-party-preferred result
Labor	Matt Thistlethwaite	45,411	52.74	−2.42
Liberal	Michael Feneley	40,692	47.26	+2.42
Labor hold		Swing	−2.42	

==== 2010 ====
2010 Australian federal election: Kingsford Smith
Party	Candidate	Votes	%	±%
Labor	Peter Garrett	35,957	43.83	−8.93
Liberal	Michael Feneley	33,836	41.25	+7.31
Greens	Lindsay Shurey	9,885	12.05	+1.63
Democrats	Josh Carmont	1,047	1.28	+1.28
One Nation	John Cunningham	728	0.89	+0.89
Socialist Equality	Zac Hambides	576	0.70	−0.56
Total formal votes		82,029	91.85	−2.84
Informal votes		7,280	8.15	+2.84
Turnout		89,309	91.37	−2.90
Two-party-preferred result
Labor	Peter Garrett	45,249	55.16	−8.10
Liberal	Michael Feneley	36,780	44.84	+8.10
Labor hold		Swing	−8.10	

=== Elections in the 2000s ===
==== 2007 ====
2007 Australian federal election: Kingsford Smith
Party	Candidate	Votes	%	±%
Labor	Peter Garrett	45,831	52.85	+4.24
Liberal	Caroline Beinke	29,402	33.90	−2.13
Greens	Sue Mahony	8,995	10.37	+2.53
Christian Democrats	Marcus Campbell	1,402	1.62	+1.62
Socialist Equality	Alex Safari	1,096	1.26	+1.26
Total formal votes		86,726	94.67	+2.97
Informal votes		4,884	5.33	−2.97
Turnout		91,610	94.22	−0.06
Two-party-preferred result
Labor	Peter Garrett	54,889	63.29	+4.56
Liberal	Caroline Beinke	31,837	36.71	−4.56
Labor hold		Swing	+4.56	

==== 2004 ====
2004 Australian federal election: Kingsford Smith
Party	Candidate	Votes	%	±%
Labor	Peter Garrett	36,565	49.60	+1.91
Liberal	Nicholas Prassas	26,639	36.14	+1.88
Greens	Hannah Robert	5,430	7.37	+0.10
Independent	Charles Matthews	2,505	3.40	+3.40
One Nation	Anna Winter	779	1.06	−3.80
Democrats	Nicole Tillotson	747	1.01	−4.19
No GST	Reg Gilroy	563	0.76	+0.76
Socialist Alliance	Maureen Frances	273	0.37	+0.37
	James Cogan	214	0.29	+0.29
Total formal votes		73,715	91.57	−2.29
Informal votes		6,790	8.43	+2.29
Turnout		80,505	93.74	−0.19
Two-party-preferred result
Labor	Peter Garrett	43,498	59.01	+0.11
Liberal	Nicholas Prassas	30,217	40.99	−0.11
Labor hold		Swing	+0.11	

==== 2001 ====
2001 Australian federal election: Kingsford Smith
Party	Candidate	Votes	%	±%
Labor	Laurie Brereton	36,428	47.69	−3.70
Liberal	Bruce Notley-Smith	26,169	34.26	+3.27
Greens	Arthur Hurwitz	5,551	7.27	+3.65
Democrats	Peter Zakrzewski	3,974	5.20	+1.19
One Nation	Jill Brown	3,710	4.86	−0.81
	Marina Carman	558	0.73	+0.73
Total formal votes		76,390	93.86	−0.96
Informal votes		4,996	6.14	+0.96
Turnout		81,386	94.60	
Two-party-preferred result
Labor	Laurie Brereton	44,995	58.90	−4.05
Liberal	Bruce Notley-Smith	31,395	41.10	+4.05
Labor hold		Swing	−4.05	

=== Elections in the 1990s ===
==== 1998 ====
1998 Australian federal election: Kingsford-Smith
Party	Candidate	Votes	%	±%
Labor	Laurie Brereton	37,123	51.87	+0.30
Liberal	Tio Faulkner	21,852	30.54	−4.48
One Nation	Jack McEwen	4,167	5.82	+5.82
Democrats	Allan Caswell	2,723	3.81	−3.87
Unity	Tatiana Haralambous	2,698	3.77	+3.77
Greens	Murray Matson	2,505	3.50	−0.81
Independent	Vladimir Goryachev	495	0.69	+0.69
Total formal votes		71,563	94.69	−0.26
Informal votes		4,013	5.31	+0.26
Turnout		75,576	93.79	−1.21
Two-party-preferred result
Labor	Laurie Brereton	45,373	63.40	+3.26
Liberal	Tio Faulkner	26,190	36.60	−3.26
Labor hold		Swing	+3.26	

==== 1996 ====
1996 Australian federal election: Kingsford-Smith
Party	Candidate	Votes	%	±%
Labor	Laurie Brereton	37,098	51.58	−7.58
Liberal	John Xenos	25,190	35.02	+3.25
Democrats	Christopher Brieger	5,523	7.68	+4.09
Greens	Jeremy Oxley	3,103	4.31	+0.21
Natural Law	Suzi Haynes	484	0.67	+0.10
	Ted Marshall	278	0.39	+0.39
	Yabu Bilyana	254	0.35	+0.35
Total formal votes		71,930	94.95	−0.70
Informal votes		3,825	5.05	+0.70
Turnout		75,755	95.00	+0.07
Two-party-preferred result
Labor	Laurie Brereton	43,028	60.15	−5.09
Liberal	John Xenos	28,511	39.85	+5.09
Labor hold		Swing	−5.09	

==== 1993 ====
1993 Australian federal election: Kingsford-Smith
Party	Candidate	Votes	%	±%
Labor	Laurie Brereton	41,383	59.15	+9.66
Liberal	Patricia Marsland	22,229	31.77	+0.46
Greens	Murray Matson	2,872	4.11	+2.55
Democrats	Andrew Larcos	2,509	3.59	−5.56
	Warwick Dove	566	0.81	+0.81
Natural Law	Philip Pearson	403	0.58	+0.58
Total formal votes		69,962	95.65	−0.48
Informal votes		3,180	4.35	+0.48
Turnout		73,142	94.93	
Two-party-preferred result
Labor	Laurie Brereton	45,611	65.24	+4.12
Liberal	Patricia Marsland	24,303	34.76	−4.12
Labor hold		Swing	+4.12	

==== 1990 ====
1990 Australian federal election: Kingsford-Smith
Party	Candidate	Votes	%	±%
Labor	Laurie Brereton	32,829	52.6	−7.1
Liberal	Carol Dance	17,174	27.5	−5.1
Democrats	Amelia Newman	6,147	9.8	+2.0
South Sydney Greens	Mark Berriman	5,606	9.0	+9.0
Independent	Kaye Tucke	688	1.1	+1.1
Total formal votes		62,444	95.6	
Informal votes		2,860	4.4	
Turnout		65,304	94.9	
Two-party-preferred result
Labor	Laurie Brereton	40,455	65.0	+0.7
Liberal	Carol Dance	21,794	35.0	−0.7
Labor hold		Swing	+0.7	

=== Elections in the 1980s ===
==== 1987 ====
1987 Australian federal election: Kingsford-Smith
Party	Candidate	Votes	%	±%
Labor	Lionel Bowen	36,478	59.7	−3.2
Liberal	Carolyn O'Connor	19,903	32.6	+6.9
Democrats	Philippa Leehy	4,765	7.8	+0.3
Total formal votes		61,146	92.4	
Informal votes		5,014	7.6	
Turnout		66,160	90.9	
Two-party-preferred result
Labor	Lionel Bowen	39,284	64.2	−6.6
Liberal	Carolyn O'Connor	21,862	35.8	+6.6
Labor hold		Swing	−6.6	

==== 1984 ====
1984 Australian federal election: Kingsford-Smith
Party	Candidate	Votes	%	±%
Labor	Lionel Bowen	37,979	62.9	−6.6
Liberal	Collin O'Neill	15,526	25.7	−0.3
Democrats	Peter Longfield	4,519	7.5	+4.4
Independent	Helen Boyle	2,321	3.8	+3.8
Total formal votes		60,345	90.0	
Informal votes		6,713	10.0	
Turnout		67,058	93.0	
Two-party-preferred result
Labor	Lionel Bowen	42,777	70.9	−1.7
Liberal	Collin O'Neill	17,551	29.1	+1.7
Labor hold		Swing	−1.7	

==== 1983 ====
1983 Australian federal election: Kingsford-Smith
Party	Candidate	Votes	%	±%
Labor	Lionel Bowen	45,168	70.4	+0.9
Liberal	Collin O'Neill	16,090	25.1	−1.9
Democrats	Anthony Larkings	1,987	3.1	−0.3
Socialist Workers	Geoffrey Channells	869	1.4	+1.4
Total formal votes		64,114	97.2	
Informal votes		1,845	2.8	
Turnout		65,959	93.9	
Two-party-preferred result
Labor	Lionel Bowen		73.5	+2.0
Liberal	Collin O'Neill		26.5	−2.0
Labor hold		Swing	+2.0	

==== 1980 ====
1980 Australian federal election: Kingsford-Smith
Party	Candidate	Votes	%	±%
Labor	Lionel Bowen	44,083	69.5	+5.1
Liberal	Collin O'Neill	17,148	27.0	−2.6
Democrats	Oliver Nekula	2,167	3.4	−2.7
Total formal votes		63,398	96.6	
Informal votes		2,262	3.4	
Turnout		65,660	92.6	
Two-party-preferred result
Labor	Lionel Bowen		71.5	+4.0
Liberal	Collin O'Neill		28.5	−4.0
Labor hold		Swing	+4.0	

=== Elections in the 1970s ===
==== 1977 ====
1977 Australian federal election: Kingsford-Smith
Party	Candidate	Votes	%	±%
Labor	Lionel Bowen	42,222	64.4	+0.8
Liberal	Collin O'Neill	19,377	29.6	−4.3
Democrats	Edward Ward	3,974	6.1	+6.1
Total formal votes		65,573	96.7	
Informal votes		2,213	3.3	
Turnout		67,786	94.2	
Two-party-preferred result
Labor	Lionel Bowen		67.5	+2.6
Liberal	Collin O'Neill		32.5	−2.6
Labor hold		Swing	+2.6	

==== 1975 ====
1975 Australian federal election: Kingsford-Smith
Party	Candidate	Votes	%	±%
Labor	Lionel Bowen	35,381	59.1	−8.7
Liberal	Desmond Connors	22,955	38.4	+8.8
Independent	Nicholas Confos	1,499	2.5	+2.5
Total formal votes		59,835	97.6	
Informal votes		1,466	2.4	
Turnout		61,301	95.1	
Two-party-preferred result
Labor	Lionel Bowen		60.4	−9.0
Liberal	Desmond Connors		39.6	+9.0
Labor hold		Swing	−9.0	

==== 1974 ====
1974 Australian federal election: Kingsford-Smith
Party	Candidate	Votes	%	±%
Labor	Lionel Bowen	39,432	67.8	+0.9
Liberal	Gary McCready	17,217	29.6	+2.1
Australia	Anthony Green	1,520	2.6	+2.6
Total formal votes		58,169	98.0	
Informal votes		1,191	2.0	
Turnout		59,360	94.1	
Two-party-preferred result
Labor	Lionel Bowen		69.4	+0.6
Liberal	Gary McCready		30.6	−0.6
Labor hold		Swing	+0.6	

==== 1972 ====
1972 Australian federal election: Kingsford-Smith
Party	Candidate	Votes	%	±%
Labor	Lionel Bowen	26,443	66.9	+8.1
Liberal	Ronald Scott	14,969	27.5	−3.9
Democratic Labor	Graham Bennett	3,088	5.7	+0.2
Total formal votes		54,500	97.7	
Informal votes		1,275	2.3	
Turnout		55,775	95.0	
Two-party-preferred result
Labor	Lionel Bowen		68.8	+5.9
Liberal	Ronald Scott		31.2	−5.9
Labor hold		Swing	+5.9	

=== Elections in the 1960s ===
==== 1969 ====
1969 Australian federal election: Kingsford-Smith
Party	Candidate	Votes	%	±%
Labor	Lionel Bowen	31,163	58.8	+4.2
Liberal	Barry Morrison	16,616	31.4	−9.0
Democratic Labor	Graham Bennett	2,908	5.5	+0.4
Pensioner Power	Beverly Chong	2,283	4.3	+4.3
Total formal votes		52,970	97.0	
Informal votes		1,626	3.0	
Turnout		54,596	93.5	
Two-party-preferred result
Labor	Lionel Bowen		62.9	+7.3
Liberal	Barry Morrison		37.1	−7.3
Labor hold		Swing	+7.3	

==== 1966 ====
1966 Australian federal election: Kingsford-Smith
Party	Candidate	Votes	%	±%
Labor	Dan Curtin	21,859	50.5	−4.3
Liberal	Nancy Wake	19,268	44.5	+3.3
Democratic Labor	Cornelius Woodbury	2,193	5.1	+5.1
Total formal votes		43,320	96.7	
Informal votes		1,477	3.3	
Turnout		44,797	93.7	
Two-party-preferred result
Labor	Dan Curtin		51.5	−6.9
Liberal	Nancy Wake		48.5	+6.9
Labor hold		Swing	−6.9	

==== 1963 ====
1963 Australian federal election: Kingsford-Smith
Party	Candidate	Votes	%	±%
Labor	Dan Curtin	24,083	54.8	−3.1
Liberal	Sidney Pitkethly	18,108	41.2	+6.4
Communist	Jim Baird	1,729	3.9	+3.9
Total formal votes		43,920	98.0	
Informal votes		913	2.0	
Turnout		44,833	94.6	
Two-party-preferred result
Labor	Dan Curtin		58.4	−1.0
Liberal	Sidney Pitkethly		41.6	+1.0
Labor hold		Swing	−1.0	

==== 1961 ====
1961 Australian federal election: Kingsford-Smith
Party	Candidate	Votes	%	±%
Labor	Dan Curtin	24,866	57.9	+1.7
Liberal	Jack Cunningham	14,963	34.8	−1.9
Democratic Labor	John Cunningham	3,120	7.3	+0.2
Total formal votes		42,949	97.2	
Informal votes		1,258	2.8	
Turnout		44,207	94.4	
Two-party-preferred result
Labor	Dan Curtin		59.4	+1.8
Liberal	Jack Cunningham		40.6	−1.8
Labor hold		Swing	+1.8	

=== Elections in the 1950s ===
==== 1958 ====
1958 Australian federal election: Kingsford-Smith
Party	Candidate	Votes	%	±%
Labor	Dan Curtin	23,713	56.2	+3.5
Liberal	George Dan	15,488	36.7	−6.1
Democratic Labor	Bernard McOrrie	3,001	7.1	+7.1
Total formal votes		42,202	97.4	
Informal votes		1,138	2.6	
Turnout		43,340	95.5	
Two-party-preferred result
Labor	Dan Curtin		57.6	+2.6
Liberal	George Dan		42.4	−2.6
Labor hold		Swing	+2.6	

==== 1955 ====
1955 Australian federal election: Kingsford-Smith
Party	Candidate	Votes	%	±%
Labor	Dan Curtin	21,647	52.7	−5.6
Liberal	John McGirr	17,546	42.8	+1.1
Independent	Hubert O'Connell	1,850	4.5	+4.5
Total formal votes		41,043	96.9	
Informal votes		1,304	3.1	
Turnout		42,347	95.1	
Two-party-preferred result
Labor	Dan Curtin		55.0	−3.3
Liberal	John McGirr		45.0	+3.3
Labor hold		Swing	−3.3	

==== 1954 ====
1954 Australian federal election: Kingsford-Smith
Party	Candidate	Votes	%	±%
Labor	Gordon Anderson	18,302	54.2	+3.7
Liberal	George Dan	15,435	45.8	−3.7
Total formal votes		33,737	98.7	
Informal votes		444	1.3	
Turnout		34,181	95.7	
Labor hold		Swing	+3.7	

==== 1951 ====
1951 Australian federal election: Kingsford-Smith
Party	Candidate	Votes	%	±%
Labor	Gordon Anderson	18,110	50.5	+0.8
Liberal	Arthur Butterell	17,784	49.5	+3.0
Total formal votes		35,894	98.0	
Informal votes		740	2.0	
Turnout		36,634	95.3	
Labor hold		Swing	−0.4	

=== Elections in the 1940s ===
==== 1949 ====
1949 Australian federal election: Kingsford-Smith
Party	Candidate	Votes	%	±%
Labor	Gordon Anderson	18,573	49.7	−4.3
Liberal	Charles de Monchaux	17,387	46.5	+9.5
Independent	Henry Crittenden	1,206	3.2	+3.2
Independent	Clare Peters	221	0.6	+0.6
Total formal votes		37,387	97.7	
Informal votes		883	2.3	
Turnout		38,270	96.5	
Two-party-preferred result
Labor	Gordon Anderson	19,042	50.9	−7.6
Liberal	Charles de Monchaux	18,345	49.1	+7.6
Labor notional hold		Swing	−7.6	
