= Kingsford Smith =

Kingsford Smith can refer to:

- Sydney Airport, the primary commercial airport serving Sydney, Australia
- Charles Kingsford Smith (1897–1935), an early Australian aviation pioneer, after whom Sydney Airport is named
- Division of Kingsford Smith, an Australian electoral division in the state of New South Wales
- Kingsford Smith (moonlet), a natural satellite of Saturn
