= Randwick City Library =

Public library system in New South Wales

- Location: Randwick LGA, Australia
- Type: Public library service
- Established: 1952
- Branches: 3

Collection
- Items collected: 197,668 (175,404 lending)

Access and use
- Circulation: 870,199
- Population served: 144,598
- Members: 53,595

Other information
- Director: Katie Anderson
- Manager: Barbara Todes
- Employees: 46
- Public transit access: Sydney Trains, Light rail in Sydney, Buses in Sydney
- References: Mantakoun, Samantha (2026-02-01). "Public library statistics 2024-25". State Library of New South Wales.

Randwick City Library is the public library system of Randwick City Council in Greater Sydney, New South Wales.

== Collections ==
Randwick City Library's historical collection has over 30,000 photos, many of which were catalogued by volunteers of the Randwick and District Historical Society.

Randwick City Library have published books based on collections of local stories and history. These include A Migrant's Story, (in collaboration with Randwick TAFE), Words of wisdom: celebrating the seniors of Randwick City, and Stories from the Street (based on the library's Writing For Pleasure program).

== Programs ==
In the 2024-25 year, Randwick City Library held 2042 programs, with 39,208 attendees.

Randwick City Library has participated in the Global Game Jam, in partnership with University of New South Wales, holding free game-making workshops at the library during the Jam.

Lionel Bowen Young Creatives Award (previously Lionel Bowen Young Writers Award) is a yearly competition by Randwick City Library. The award has categories for writing, audio-visual, and visual arts. It is run in collaboration with the University of New South Wales.

== Branches ==
Randwick City Library has three branches: Lionel Bowen Library and Community Centre (Maroubra), Margaret Martin Library (Randwick), and Malabar Community Library (Matraville).

The Lionel Bowen Library is named after previous Randwick mayor and parliamentary respresentative, and later deputy prime minister, Lionel Bowen. The Margaret Martin Library is located in the Randwick Shopping Centre and is named after Margaret Martin, the first female mayor of Randwick. Margaret Martin Library was shortlisted for two Interior Design Excellence Awards (IDEA) in 2010. Malabar Community Library is the smallest branch.

== Toy and Game Library ==
The Randwick Toy and Game Library is one of the largest toy libraries in the Sydney area. It has the largest toy and game collection of any public library in New South Wales, with 2,644 items. The Toy and Game Library began in 1983 with 381 toys at the Maroubra Central Library. The toy library was part of the general library system until 2000, when it merged with Eastern Suburbs Toy Library and a membership fee was introduced. The Randwick Toy Library is not contained within one location; toys are available to borrow at all library branches.

== History ==
=== Pre-library history ===
In the first decade of the 1900s, the Randwick Council had applied to Andrew Carnegie for funding to start a library in Kensington (possibly within the Kensington school of arts) or Coogee, during the time of Carnegie's prolific library funding in the United States. A reply from Carnegie's secretary said the matter was unable to be considered due to the "overwhelming number of applications received last summer". Years later, a response was received from Carnegie stating that the Randwick council would need to provide an annual sum of £100, but no Carnegie Library was ever funded.

The Randwick City Council expressed interest in adopting the Library Act 1939 before it was finalised (which, despite the act's name, was not until 1944 after being postponed due to World War II). Randwick City Council was an early adopter of the act, adopting it in 1946.

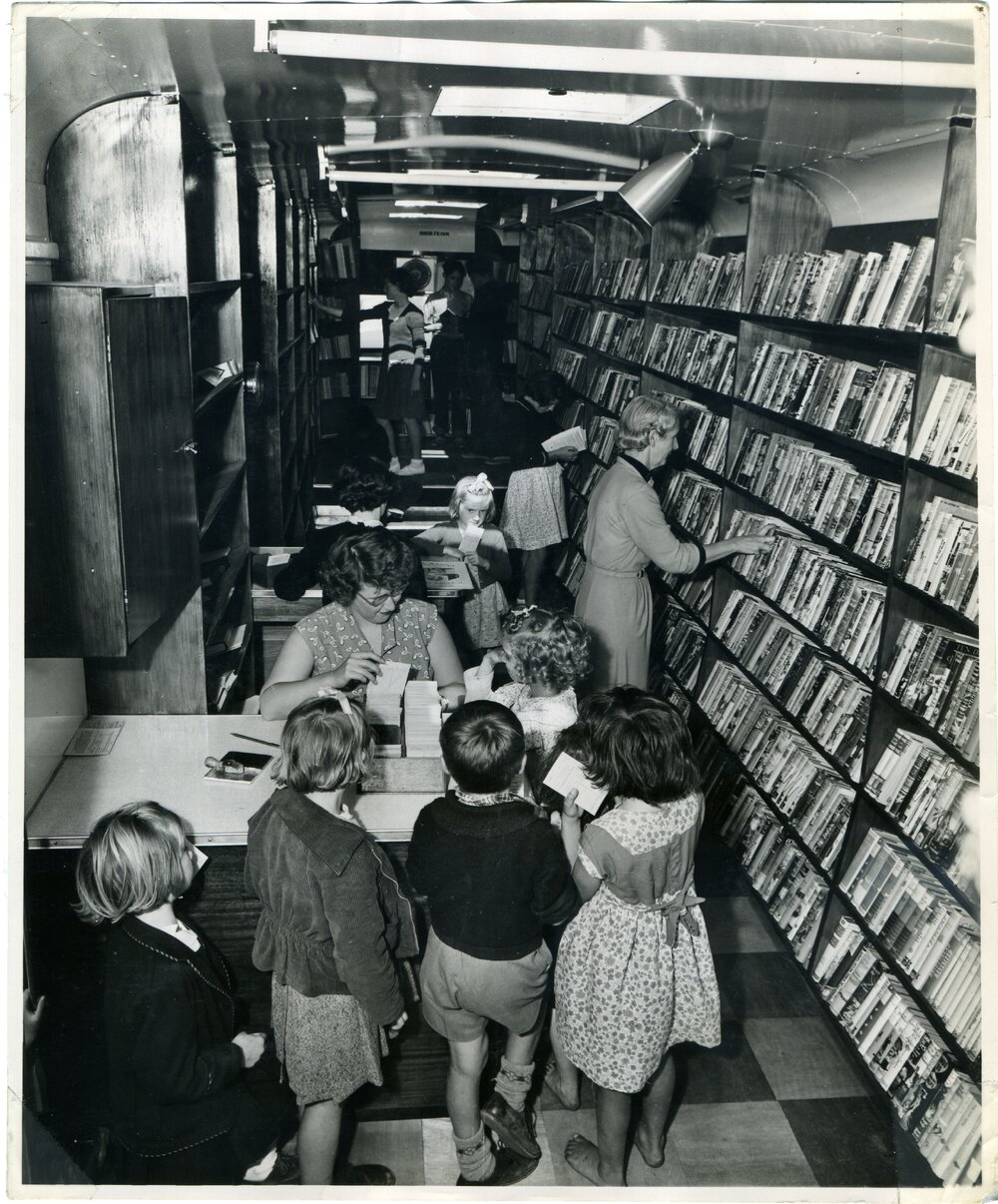
Children and staff in the Randwick City Library bookmobile in 1955

=== Beginnings ===
The Randwick Library was opened in 1952, but less than a year later the collection size was already outgrowing the existing space. The Randwick bookmobile began in 1953, staffed with one driver and two librarians. At the time it was the largest mobile library in Australia, with over 4000 books.

=== Randwick-Botany Joint Library Service ===
In 1976 Randwick City Council and City of Botany Bay joined together to create the Randwick-Botany Joint Library Service. During this time, the library's bookmobile service endedm originally to be replaced with two minivans to take people to branch libraries, but this ended before the trial time was even finished. The audio-visual auditorium at Maroubra was opened in 1981, with approximately 9816 items including cassette tapes, art prints, films, and games, making the library one of the first in Australia to have cassette tapes available for loan. 1983, the Randwick-Botany Toy Library (later the Randwick Toy and Game Library) began at the Maroubra Central Library. In 1984 Mascot Library was nominated for the Library Design Awards. Botany Council decided to deparate in 1983 and Randwick libraries became independent again in 1984.

=== Fire and funding difficulties ===
In 1987, there was a large fire at Maroubra Central Library, with the building destroyed. The damaged to stock was estimated at over $1million, with many books suffering smoke damage. A new library (to replace the old burnt-down one) was opened in Maroubra in 1991, named Bowen Library.

In 1992, there were plans to close down Matraville Library, which was significantly smaller than Bowen Library, in order to save library funding. Library funding had been struggling since the late 1980s, and the council had spent a significant amount of it on the new Bowen Library. The closure was heavily debated by the council, and protests were held by residents. It was decided to keep the library open.

=== 2000s ===
In 2003, around $7000 worth of fine-art books, which were no longer in print, were stolen or damaged (with individual pages cut out and stolen, believed to have been framed and sold) from Randwick City Library. This was part of a larger spree of thievery of rare art books in libraries around Sydney at the time. In 2009 Randwick City Library became to the first library in Sydney to offer ebooks for loan.

In 2012, the Randwick Branch Library was renamed Margaret Martin Library, after the first female mayor of Randwick. Four years later in 2016, Bowen Library was renamed Lionel Bowen Library. In 2013, Randwick Library was visited by (then princess, now Queen since 2024) Mary of Denmark for the launch of eSmart, an anti-cyberbullying and e-safety program sponsored by the Alannah and Madeline Foundation, of which the Princess was the international patron of.

Like many libraries in Sydney, Randwick City Library branches were closed during parts of the COVID-19 Pandemic. In July 2020, Randwick City Library got rid of late fines for borrowed items, waiving over $169,936 worth of fines.
