= William Gollan =

Australian politician

The Honourable William Gollan CBE

Secretary for Mines
- In office 1 July 1954 – 15 March 1956
- Premier: Joseph Cahill
- Preceded by: Frank Buckley
- Succeeded by: Roger Nott

Secretary for Lands
- In office 22 November 1957 – 1 April 1959
- Premier: Joseph Cahill
- Preceded by: Roger Nott
- Succeeded by: John McMahon

Personal details
- Born: 15 June 1885 Woodburn, Colony of New South Wales
- Died: 4 October 1968 (aged 83) Rose Bay, New South Wales, Australia
- Party: Labor

William McCulloch Gollan CBE (15 June 1885 – 4 October 1968) was an Australian politician and a member of the New South Wales Legislative Assembly from 1941 until 1962. He was a member of the Labor Party. He held numerous ministerial positions between 1953 and 1959.

== Early life ==
Gollan was born in Woodburn, New South Wales and was the son of a farmer, John Gollan. He was educated at Lismore Public School and initially worked as a bush worker in rural New South Wales. After several years abroad in South Africa, he later lived in Sydney and owned various businesses including a chain of butcher shops and hotels. Gollan was the owner of the Gollan Hotel in Lismore, where Queen Elizabeth II and Prince Philip stayed one night on 9 February 1954 during their Australian tour.

== Political career ==
Gollan was elected to the New South Wales Parliament as the Labor member for Randwick at the 1941 state election, where he defeated the sitting United Australia Party member, Arthur Moverly in the landslide victory that allowed William McKell to form a government. During the premierships of Joseph Cahill and Robert Heffron, Gollan held numerous ministerial positions including as a Minister without portfolio, Secretary for Mines and Secretary for Lands.

== Later life ==
He held his seat of Randwick at six following elections and retired at the 1962 state election. A member of the Australian Jockey Club since 1918, Gollan was a trustee of Randwick racecourse (1954–1968) and helped establish the Sydney Turf Club. He served on the board of Prince Henry Hospital, including a term as deputy chairman, and was appointed a councillor of the University of New South Wales from 1953 until 1962. He was granted retention of the "Honourable" title in 1959.

Made a Commander of the Order of the British Empire (CBE) in 1962, in retirement he became a supporter of the Liberal Party in 1966. He died aged 83 in October 1968 at Rose Bay and was buried at Northern Suburbs Crematorium, following a service at St Stephens Presbyterian church in Macquarie Street.

New South Wales Legislative Assembly
Preceded by Arthur Moverly	Member for Randwick; 1941 – 1962	Succeeded by Lionel Bowen
Political offices
Preceded by Frank Buckley	Secretary for Mines; 1954 – 1956	Succeeded by Roger Nott
Preceded by Roger Nott	Secretary for Lands; 1957 – 1959	Succeeded by John McMahon as Minister for Lands
