= Division of Watson (1934–1969) =

Former Australian federal electoral division

Watson Australian House of Representatives Division
- Created: 1934
- Abolished: 1969
- Namesake: Chris Watson

The Division of Watson was an Australian electoral division in the state of New South Wales. It was located in the inner southern suburbs of Sydney, and originally included the suburbs of Coogee, Kensington and Maroubra. By the time it was abolished in 1968, it covered the suburbs of Banksmeadow, Mascot and Redfern.

The Division was named after Hon. Chris Watson, the first Labor Prime Minister of Australia. It replaced his old seat of South Sydney, and was proclaimed at the redistribution of 1 August 1934. It was abolished at the redistribution of 21 November 1968 and merged into the neighbouring division of Kingsford Smith.

After the redistribution of 31 January 1992, the Division of St George was abolished, and a new Division of Watson was created. That Division is not connected to this one, except in name.

== Members ==
Image	Member	Party	Term	Notes
	John Jennings (1878–1968)	United Australia	15 September 1934 – 21 September 1940	Previously held the Division of South Sydney. Lost seat
	Max Falstein (1914–1967)	Labor	21 September 1940 – 22 October 1949	Lost preselection and then lost seat
	Max Falstein (1914–1967)	Independent Labor	22 October 1949 – 10 December 1949	Lost preselection and then lost seat
	Dan Curtin (1898–1980)	Labor	10 December 1949 – 10 December 1955	Transferred to the Division of Kingsford-Smith
	Jim Cope (1907–1999)	Labor	10 December 1955 – 25 October 1969	Previously held the Division of Cook. Transferred to the Division of Sydney after Watson was abolished in 1969

== See also ==
- Division of Watson
