= Jack Flanagan (Australian politician) =

Australian politician

- Born: Jack Flanagan; 11 July 1888; Queanbeyan
- Died: 3 March 1949 (aged 60); Darlinghurst
- Occupation: Politics

John Flanagan (11 July 1888 – 3 March 1949) was an Australian politician. He was a Labor Party member of the New South Wales Legislative Assembly from 1930 until 1932, representing the electorate of Randwick.

== Early years ==
Flanagan was born at Queanbeyan, and was a painter by trade. He worked at the Eveleigh Workshops from 1912 until 1917, when he was dismissed after taking part in the Australian General Strike of 1917. He was reinstated in March 1919, but resigned two months later to become state secretary of the Amalgamated Coachmakers' Association, a role he held until his election to parliament.

== Political career ==
Flanagan was the Labor candidate for Randwick at the 1927 state election, but was defeated by Nationalist Ernest Tresidder. In 1930, he won the seat on his second attempt, defeating Tresider with a massive swing as Labor won office under Jack Lang. His political career was to be short-lived, however; Labor's popularity collapsed as Lang was dismissed by the state Governor for his controversial response to the Great Depression, and Flanagan lost his seat to United Australia Party candidate Arthur Moverly, one of many Labor MLAs to lose his seat that year. He again contested Randwick in 1935, but lost to Moverly a second time.

== Later life ==
Flanagan worked in a shoe store after his parliamentary defeat, and later became a shipping clerk. He divorced his wife, Gertrude Ann Flanagan, in 1938, having been married since 1915.

He died on 3 March 1949 (aged 60) from a cerebral abscess at St Vincent's Hospital, Sydney and was buried at the Congregational Cemetery at Randwick.

New South Wales Legislative Assembly
Preceded by Ernest Tresidder	Member for Randwick; 1930–1932	Succeeded by Arthur Moverly
