= Ernest Tresidder =

Australian politician

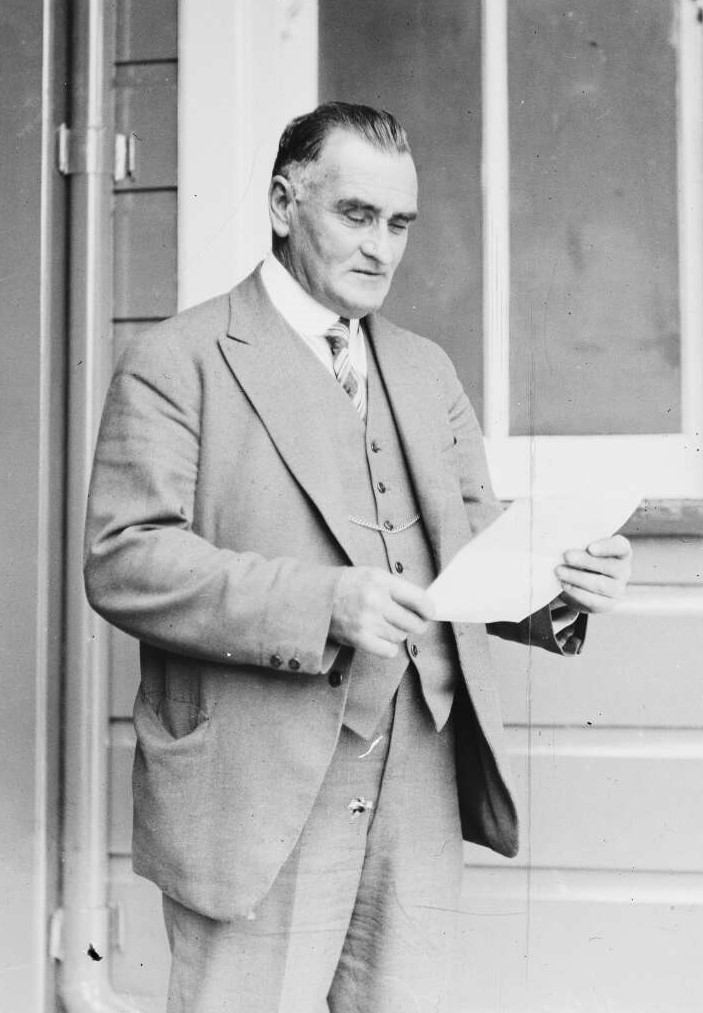

Ernest Philip Tresidder (30 April 1875 – 9 March 1951) was an Australian politician

He was born at Bendigo to William Prideaux Tresidder and Elizabeth Jane, née White. He attended Bendigo Public School before becoming a pastry cook, owning a business at Northcote in Melbourne. Around 1900 he married Celia Johnson at Clifton Hill, with whom he had three children. The family moved to Sydney around 1913 and established Kenso Cake Company; Tresidder was later director of the Sydney Cake Company. He served on Randwick Municipal Council from 1920 to 1931, with periods as mayor from 1922 to 1924 and during 1926. He also served on Sydney City Council from 1930 to 1944. From 1927 to 1930 he was a Nationalist member of the New South Wales Legislative Assembly, representing Randwick. Tresidder died in 1951 at Little Bay.

Civic offices
Preceded by George James Baker	Mayor of Randwick; 1922 – 1924	Succeeded by James Ambrose Bardon
Preceded by James Ambrose Bardon	Mayor of Randwick; 1926	Succeeded by John Dunningham
New South Wales Legislative Assembly
Preceded by New seat	Member for Randwick; 1927–1930	Succeeded by Jack Flanagan
Government offices
Preceded by Stanley Parry	Chairman of the Sydney County Council; 1940 – 1941	Succeeded by Stanley Parry
