= List of mayors of Randwick =

Mayor of Randwick
- Incumbent; Clare Willington since 29 September 2026
- Style: His/Her Worship the Mayor Councillor
- Appointer: Randwick City Council
- Term length: Two years, renewable indefinitely
- Inaugural holder: Simeon Henry Pearce
- Formation: 1 April 1859
- Deputy: Masoomeh Asgari
- Salary: $30,550–71,300 (2022)
- Website: randwick.nsw.gov.au

The mayor of Randwick is the head of Randwick City Council, which is a local government area covering part of the Eastern Suburbs of Sydney in the State of New South Wales, Australia. First incorporated on 1 April 1859 as the Municipality of Randwick, under the terms of the Municipalities Act of 1858, the first leaders of the Council were titled "Chairman" until the 1858 act was replaced by the Municipalities Act of 1867, which introduced the title of "Mayor". On 28 June 1973, the council was dismissed and placed under the control of government administrators after an inquiry into the council's handling of Development Applications, finding significant undeclared conflicts-of-interest between councillors and local developments. It remained under administration until 24 September 1977. On 1 July 1993 following the enactment of a new Local Government Act, elected representatives of the council were to be known as "Councillor", replacing the former title of "Alderman".

The mayor is internally-elected by the councillors, and nominally serves a two-year term since 2017, which replaced the previous system of annual mayoral elections. The current mayor of Randwick is Councillor Clare Willington (The Greens), first elected on 29 September 2026. The mayor is assisted in their work by a deputy mayor, who is elected on an annual basis by the elected councillors.

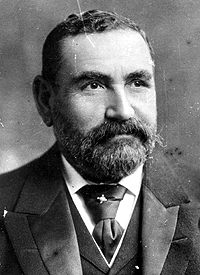
Sir John See, Mayor: 1880–1881, 1886; Premier of New South Wales: 1901–1904.

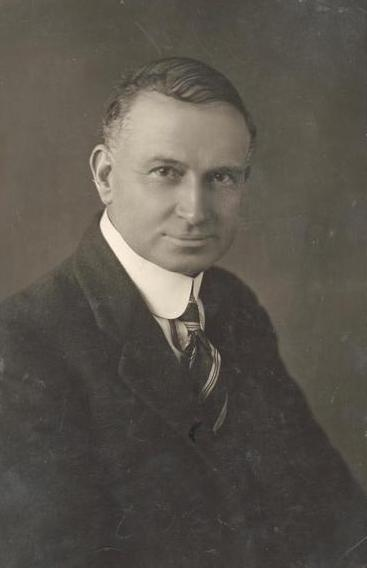
John Jennings, Mayor: 1929–1930; Member of the Australian House of Representatives: 1931–1940.

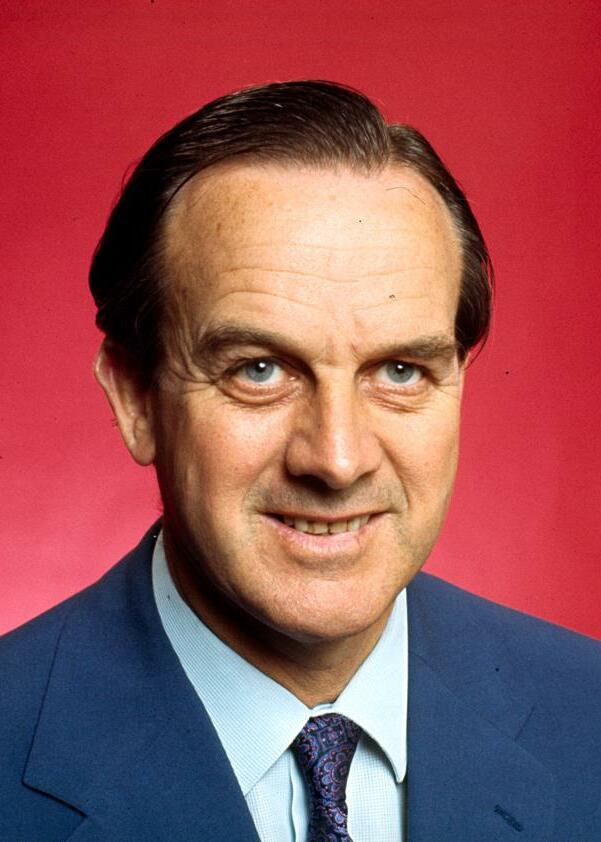
Lionel Bowen, Mayor: 1951, 1955; Deputy Prime Minister of Australia: 1983–1990.

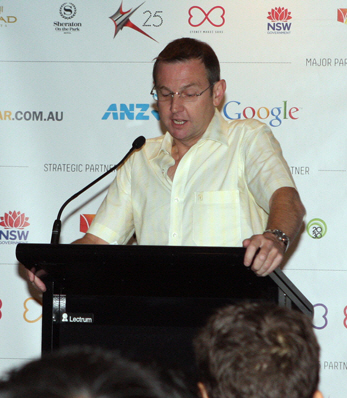
Bruce Notley-Smith, Mayor: 2007–2009; First openly Gay Member of the New South Wales Legislative Assembly: 2011–2019.

== List of incumbents ==
#	Chairman	Party	Term start	Term end	Time in office	Notes
1	Simeon Henry Pearce	No party	1 April 1859	15 February 1861	1 year, 320 days	
2	John Dawson	No party	15 February 1861	February 1863	1 year, 351 days	
3	Charles Moore	No party	February 1863	February 1864	1 year, 0 days	
–	John Dawson	No party	February 1864	15 February 1866	2 years, 14 days	
–	Simeon Henry Pearce	No party	15 February 1866	8 February 1868	1 year, 358 days	
#	Mayor	Party	Term start	Term end	Time in office	Notes
–	Simeon Henry Pearce	No party	8 February 1868	5 February 1869	363 days	
4	Magnus Peden	No party	5 February 1869	10 February 1870	1 year, 5 days	
5	Walter Bradley	No party	10 February 1870	6 February 1873	2 years, 362 days	
6	John Thompson	No party	6 February 1873	12 May 1874	1 year, 95 days	
7	Thomas Roger Yeo	No party	12 May 1874	6 February 1875	270 days	
8	James Hawkins Butchart	No party	6 February 1875	4 February 1876	363 days	
9	Thomas James Stutchbury	No party	4 February 1876	9 February 1877	1 year, 5 days	
10	William Maguire	No party	9 February 1877	1 August 1877	173 days	
11	George Kiss	No party	7 August 1877	6 February 1879	1 year, 183 days	
12	George Wall	No party	6 February 1879	5 February 1880	364 days	
13	John See	No party	5 February 1880	16 February 1882	2 years, 11 days	
–	Simeon Henry Pearce	No party	16 February 1882	6 February 1883	355 days	
14	George Denning	No party	6 February 1883	11 February 1884	1 year, 5 days	
–	Walter Bradley	No party	11 February 1884	12 February 1885	1 year, 1 day	
–	George Denning	No party	12 February 1885	9 February 1886	362 days	
–	John See	No party	9 February 1886	4 February 1887	360 days	
15	Thomas James Lowe	Independent	4 February 1887	10 February 1890	3 years, 6 days	
16	James Robertson	Independent	10 February 1890	21 February 1893	3 years, 11 days	
17	Henry Frederick Francis	Independent	21 February 1893	12 February 1894	356 days	
18	Frederick William Henry Pearce	Independent	12 February 1894	11 February 1896	1 year, 364 days	
19	John Alfred Ironside Perry	Independent	11 February 1896	11 February 1898	2 years, 0 days	
20	William Houston	Independent	11 February 1898	February 1899	1 year, 0 days	
21	Theodore Powell	Independent	13 February 1899	3 July 1900	1 year, 140 days	
22	Isaac Barker Hodgson	Independent	6 July 1900	11 February 1902	1 year, 220 days	
23	George Gale	Independent	11 February 1902	10 February 1904	1 year, 364 days	
24	James Hincks	Independent	10 February 1904	17 February 1905	1 year, 7 days	
25	James Snape	Independent	17 February 1905	16 February 1906	364 days	
26	John Campbell Macdougall	Independent	16 February 1906	February 1908	1 year, 350 days	
–	James Snape	Independent	February 1908	14 February 1910	2 years, 13 days	
27	Thomas Robert Gilderthorp	Independent	14 February 1910	13 February 1911	364 days	
28	Douglas Maxwell Cooper	Independent	13 February 1911	19 March 1912	1 year, 35 days	
–	Thomas Robert Gilderthorp	Independent	19 March 1912	10 February 1913		
29	Archibald Campbell	Independent	10 February 1913	5 February 1914		
–	Douglas Maxwell Cooper	Independent	5 February 1914	1 March 1915		
30	Frederick Henry Clarke	Independent	1 March 1915	22 May 1916		
31	John Fenton	Independent	22 May 1916	13 February 1918		
32	Hyman Goldstein	Independent	13 February 1918	February 1920		
33	George James Baker	Independent	February 1920	December 1921		
34	Ernest Tresidder	Independent	December 1921	December 1924		
35	James Ambrose Bardon	Independent	December 1924	December 1925		
–	Ernest Tresidder	Independent	December 1925	December 1926		
36	John Dunningham	Independent	December 1926	December 1928		
37	John Jennings	Independent	December 1928	December 1930		
38	Arthur Moverly	Independent	December 1930	December 1932		
39	Silas Garnet Paine	Independent	December 1932	December 1934		
40	Mark Foots	Independent	December 1934	December 1936		
41	Reginald Fitzgerald Bourke	Independent	December 1936	December 1938		
42	John Vincent Dick	Independent	December 1938	December 1940		
43	Reginald William Bieler	Independent	December 1940	December 1941		
44	James O'Sullivan	Independent	December 1941	December 1942		
45	John Quinton Henning Rubie	Independent	December 1942	1 December 1943		
46	George Ernest Rush	Independent	1 December 1943	December 1944		
–	Reginald William Bieler	Independent	December 1944	December 1945		
–	John Vincent Dick	Independent	December 1945	30 December 1946		
47	William John Heffernan	Independent	30 December 1946	December 1947		
48	Walter Padgen	Labor	December 1947	14 December 1948		
49	Andrew Thomson Bedford	Independent	14 December 1948	13 December 1949	364 days	
50	George Nicholas Elias Dan	Independent	13 December 1949	December 1950		
51	Lionel Bowen	Labor	December 1950	December 1951		
52	Lou Walsh	Labor	December 1951	December 1952		
53	Matthew Dwyer	Independent	December 1952	December 1953		
54	Harry Jensen	Labor	December 1953	14 December 1954		
–	Lionel Bowen	Labor	14 December 1954	December 1955		
55	Ranville Ashmore Popplewell	Independent	December 1955	December 1956		
56	William Henry Lucas	Independent	December 1956	9 December 1958		
57	A. Charles Molloy	Independent	9 December 1958	December 1962		
58	Bill Haigh	Labor	December 1962	December 1968		
59	Peter Saphin	Independent	December 1968	December 1969		
–	Ranville Ashmore Popplewell	Independent	December 1969	September 1971		
60	F. C. Waller	Independent	September 1971	September 1972		
61	Frank Amour	Independent	September 1972	28 June 1973		
–	Robert Henry Cornish (Administrator)		28 June 1973	1 May 1974	307 days	
–	Jack Hercules Luscombe (Administrator)		1 May 1974	September 1977	3 years, 139 days	
62	Bill Newman	Independent	27 September 1977	September 1979		
63	Ken Finn	Liberal	September 1979	September 1980		
64	John Francis Ford	Independent	September 1980	September 1983		
65	John Buchanan	Independent	September 1983	September 1984		
66	Les Frederick Bridge	Independent	September 1984	September 1985		
–	Bill Newman	Independent	September 1985	September 1986		
67	John Scullion	Labor	September 1986	27 September 1988		
68	Bill Blake	Independent	27 September 1988	September 1989		
69	Paul Bayutti	Independent	September 1989	September 1990		
70	Charles Matthews	Independent	September 1990	September 1991		
–	John Buchanan	Independent	September 1991	September 1992		
71	Margaret Martin	Independent	September 1992	September 1993		
72	Chris Bastic	Labor	September 1993	September 1996		
–	Margaret Martin	Independent	September 1996	September 1997		
–	Ken Finn	Liberal	September 1997	September 1998		
73	Dominic Sullivan	Labor	September 1998	20 April 2004		
74	Murray Matson	Greens	20 April 2004	20 September 2005	1 year, 153 days	
75	Ted Seng	Liberal	20 September 2005	19 September 2006	364 days	
76	Paul Tracey	Labor	19 September 2006	18 September 2007	364 days	
77	Bruce Notley-Smith	Liberal	18 September 2007	29 September 2009	2 years, 11 days	
78	John Procopiadis	Labor	29 September 2009	December 2009	364 days	
78	John Procopiadis	Independent	December 2009	28 September 2010	364 days	
–	Murray Matson	Greens	28 September 2010	27 September 2011	364 days	
79	Scott Nash	Liberal	27 September 2011	25 September 2012	364 days	
80	Tony Bowen	Labor	25 September 2012	24 September 2013	364 days	
–	Scott Nash	Liberal	24 September 2013	30 September 2014	1 year, 6 days	
–	Ted Seng	Liberal	30 September 2014	29 September 2015	364 days	
81	Noel D'Souza	Labor	29 September 2015	3 May 2017	1 year, 362 days	
81	Noel D'Souza	Independent	3 May 2017	26 September 2017	1 year, 362 days	
82	Lindsay Shurey	Greens	26 September 2017	26 September 2018	1 year, 0 days	
83	Kathy Neilson	Labor	26 September 2018	24 September 2019	363 days	
84	Danny Said	Labor	24 September 2019	30 September 2021	2 years, 6 days	
85	Dylan Parker	Labor	30 September 2021	26 September 2023	1 year, 361 days	
86	Philipa Veitch	Greens	26 September 2023	8 October 2024	1 year, 12 days	
87	Dylan Parker	Labor	8 October 2024	29 September 2026	2 years, 45 days	
88	Clare Willington	Greens	29 September 2026	Incumbent		

== Deputy Mayors ==
The position of Deputy Mayor was made a permanent council position under the Local Government Act 1919. The following individuals have been elected as Deputy Mayor of Randwick:

#	Deputy Mayor	Party	Term start	Term end	Time in office	Notes	Mayor
	H. D. O'Connell		December 1942	December 1943			Rubie
	Richard Ernest Wilson	Communist	December 1943	December 1944			Rush
	A. Charles Molloy	Independent	December 1957	9 December 1958			Lucas
	A. W. Cantrill	Independent	9 December 1958	December 1959			Molloy
	George Mordey	Independent	27 September 1977	September 1978			Newman
	John Procopiadis	Labor	September 1995	September 1996			Bastic
	Ken Finn	Liberal	September 1996	September 1997			Martin
	Shane Barber	Labor	September 1997	September 1998			Finn
	John Procopiadis	Labor	September 1998	September 1999			Sullivan
–	Shane Barber	Labor	September 1999	September 2000			Sullivan
	Michael Daley	Labor	September 2000	20 April 2004			Sullivan
	Bruce Notley-Smith	Liberal	20 April 2004	20 September 2005	1 year, 153 days		Matson
	Murray Matson	Greens	20 September 2005	19 September 2006	3 years, 10 days		Seng
	Murray Matson	Greens	19 September 2006	18 September 2007	3 years, 10 days		Tracey
	Murray Matson	Greens	18 September 2007	30 September 2008	3 years, 10 days		Notley-Smith
	Margaret Woodsmith	Greens	30 September 2008	29 September 2009	364 days		Notley-Smith
	Robert Belleli	Liberal	29 September 2009	28 September 2010	364 days		Procopiadis
	Kiel Smith	Liberal	28 September 2010	27 September 2011	364 days		Matson
	Bradley Hughes	Greens	27 September 2011	25 September 2012	364 days		Nash
	Noel D'Souza	Labor	25 September 2012	24 September 2013	364 days		Bowen
	Anthony Andrews	Independent	24 September 2013	30 September 2014	2 years, 5 days		Nash
	Anthony Andrews	Independent	30 September 2014	29 September 2015	2 years, 5 days		Seng
	Greg Moore	Labor	29 September 2015	27 September 2016	364 days		D'Souza
	Brendan Roberts	Liberal	27 September 2016	26 September 2017	364 days		D'Souza
	Alexandra Luxford	Labor	26 September 2017	26 September 2018	1 year, 0 days		Shurey
	Danny Said	Labor	26 September 2018	24 September 2019	363 days		Neilson
	Philipa Veitch	Greens	24 September 2019	30 September 2021	2 years, 6 days		Said
	Lindsay Shurey	Greens	30 September 2021	30 December 2021	91 days		Parker
	Kym Chapple	Greens	30 December 2021	27 September 2022	271 days		Parker
	Rafaela Pandolfini	Greens	27 September 2022	26 September 2023	364 days		Parker
	Alexandra Luxford	Labor	26 September 2023	8 October 2024	378 days		Veitch
	Marea Wilson	Labor	8 October 2024	23 September 2025	350 days		Parker
	Clare Willington	Greens	23 September 2025	29 September 2025			Parker
	Masoomeh Asgari	Greens	29 September 2025	Incumbent			Willington
