= David Storey (politician) =

Australian politician

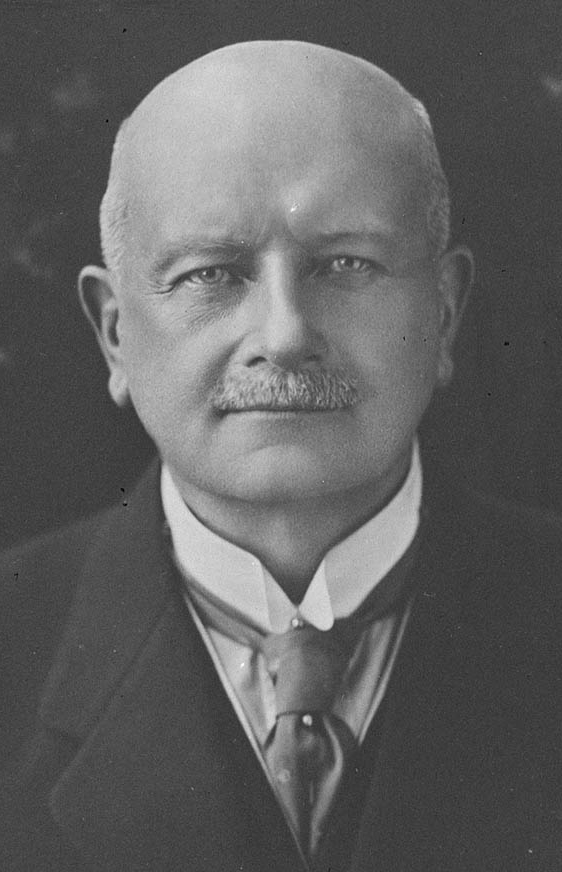
- Storey, 1920

Minister of Public Health
- In office 18 July 1919 – 29 January 1920

Member of the New South Wales Legislative Assembly for Randwick
- In office 17 July 1894 – 31 January 1920

Member of the New South Wales Legislative Council
- In office 27 April 1920 – 27 July 1924

Personal details
- Born: 18 August 1856 County Monaghan, Ireland
- Died: 27 July 1924 (aged 67) Randwick, New South Wales
- Party: Free Trade; Liberal Reform Party; Nationalist Party
- Spouse: Rachael Agnes Doig (m. 1883)
- Children: 3

Sir David Storey (18 August 1856 – 27 July 1924) was an Irish-born Australian politician and businessman. He was a member of the New South Wales Legislative Assembly from 1894 to 1920 and the New South Wales Legislative Council from 1920 until his death in 1924, representing the Free Trade Party and its successors the Liberal Reform Party and Nationalist Party. He was Minister of Public Health in the Nationalist ministry of William Holman in 1919–20.

== Early life and business career ==
Storey was born and educated in County Monaghan, Ireland, the son of farmer Robert Storey and Margaret Colvin. After completing his education, he worked for softgoods merchant James Hartley in County Cavan and then as a representative of the firm of Lindsay Brothers Ltd. in north-western Ireland.

Storey emigrated to Sydney in 1879, working as a departmental manager for the firm of Ross, Morgan and Robertson. In 1881, he formed an importing firm in partnership with James C. Lindsay, a principal of his old firm in Ireland, and continued on the business as David Storey & Co. after dissolving the partnership in 1883. He became chairman of the Commercial Travellers Association of New South Wales in 1893, was chairman of the board of the Insurance Office of Australia, president of the Ulster Association of New South Wales, was a director of the Society for the Relief of Destitute Children from 1903 and was foundation president of the Bronte Surf Bathing Association in 1907. Storey was actively involved in the free trade movement, serving as secretary of the Freetrade and Land Reformist League in the 1890s.

== Political career ==
In 1894, he was elected to the New South Wales Legislative Assembly as the Free Trade member for Randwick, defeating future Prime Minister of Australia Edmund Barton. He joined the Liberal Reform Party in 1901. He led a group of 7 rebels who objected to Premier Charles Wade's autocratic leadership and his tactics at the 1910 election. He attempted to form a new political party, the Democratic Party, however that collapsed in October 1911 when the party refused to support a candidate to contest the Maitland by-election. Storey re-joined the Liberal Reform party before the 1913 election. In November 1916 Labor split over conscription, when Premier Holman and twenty of his supporters were expelled from the party. Storey helped to establish the grand coalition with Holman and his supporters and by 1917 this had coalesced into the Nationalist Party of Australia, which Storey claimed to have named. He was a minister without portfolio in the Holman Nationalist ministry from 1916 to 1919, when he became Minister of Public Health. He had reportedly declined earlier offers of a ministry in the Carruthers ministry due to his business interests. He resigned from the ministry and from the Legislative Assembly in 1920 and was appointed to the Legislative Council four months later, serving until his death in 1924.

== Personal life ==
He married Rachel Agnes Doig in Sydney on 4 July 1883.

Storey was knighted in the 1923 New Year Honours. and died in Randwick, New South Wales from pneumonia on 27 July 1924 (aged 67) and was buried at South Head Cemetery. He was survived by his wife Rachel, daughter and 4 sons.

== Arms ==
Coat of arms of David Storey

Notes
Granted 28 March 1911 by Nevile Rodwell Wilkinson, Ulster King of Arms.
Crest
On a garb fessways Or banded Gules a stork Proper.
Torse
Of the colours.
Escutcheon
Per fess Or and Azure a pale counterchanged three storks Sable beaked and membered Gules and as many garbs of the first banded of the last.
Motto
Ciconia Fausta Avis

Parliament of New South Wales
Political offices
Preceded by Jack FitzGerald	Minister of Public Health; 1916 – 1919	Succeeded by Greg McGirr as Minister of Public Health and Motherhood
New South Wales Legislative Assembly
New district	Member for Randwick; 1894–1920	District abolished
