= Edward Riley (Australian politician) =

Australian politician

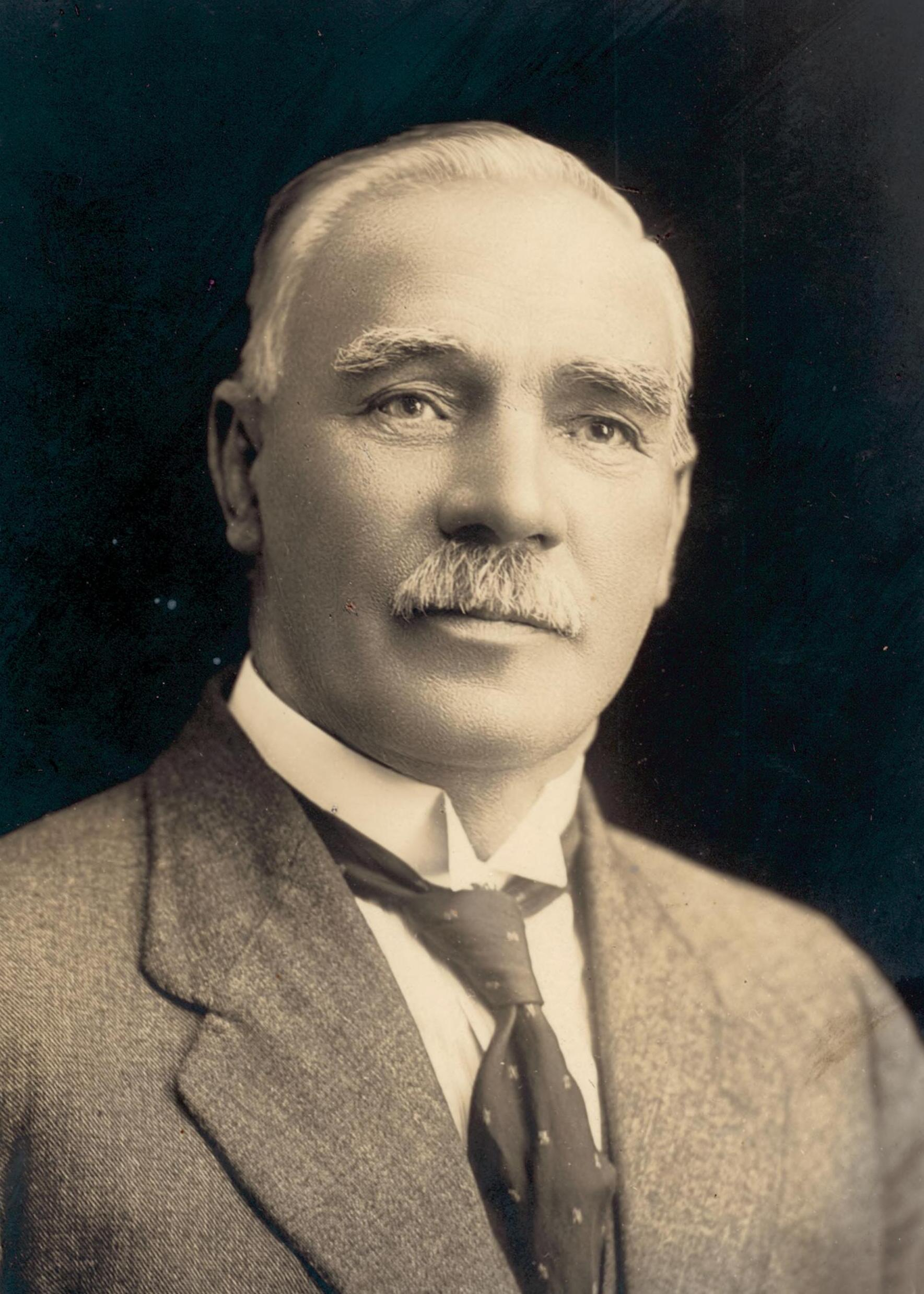

Member of the Australian Parliament for South Sydney
- In office 13 April 1910 – 19 December 1931
- Preceded by: Chris Watson
- Succeeded by: John Jennings

Personal details
- Born: 1859 Glasgow, Scotland
- Died: 21 July 1943 (aged 83–84)
- Party: Australian Labor Party
- Children: Edward Charles Riley
- Occupation: Plasterer

Edward Riley (1859 – 21 July 1943) was an Australian politician. He was an Australian Labor Party member of the Australian House of Representatives for South Sydney from 1910 to 1931.

Born in Glasgow in Scotland, he received a primary education and migrated to Australia in 1883. He was a plasterer by trade and became involved in the Plasterers' Union soon after his arrival. He was a representative of the union on the Trades and Labour Council of Sydney and twice served as the council's president. He was a founding member of the Labour Party in New South Wales, twice served as president of the Political Labour League during election campaigns and was on the board of The Worker newspaper. He was then elected by the trade unions as the employees' representative on the then Arbitration Court, serving for three years until that court's abolition. He was defeated in his first three candidacies for office: twice for the state seat of Camperdown and once for South Sydney.

In 1910 he was elected to the Australian House of Representatives for the seat of South Sydney, succeeding former Labor Prime Minister Chris Watson. He was a chairman of the Standing Committee on Public Works from 1914 to 1917 and a member of the 1923 Select Committee on Effect of the Operation of the Navigation Act on Trade and 1926 Joint Select Committee on Commonwealth Electoral Law and Procedure. He held his seat until his defeat at the 1931 federal election, where a Lang Labor candidate beat him into third in the wake of the 1931 Labor split, allowing a United Australia Party candidate to win the seat.

Riley died in Sydney in 1943 at the age of 84.

He married Annie Kirk, who predeceased him in April 1931; they had three sons and three daughters. One of their sons, Edward Charles Riley, was the member for Cook from 1922 to 1934 and served alongside his father in the House. One of their daughters, Ellen, married Nationalist Senator Walter Leslie Duncan, but predeceased them in 1922.

Parliament of Australia
Preceded by Chris Watson	Member for South Sydney; 1910–1931	Succeeded by John Jennings
