= George Edwards (Australian politician) =

Australian politician

The Honourable George Edwards
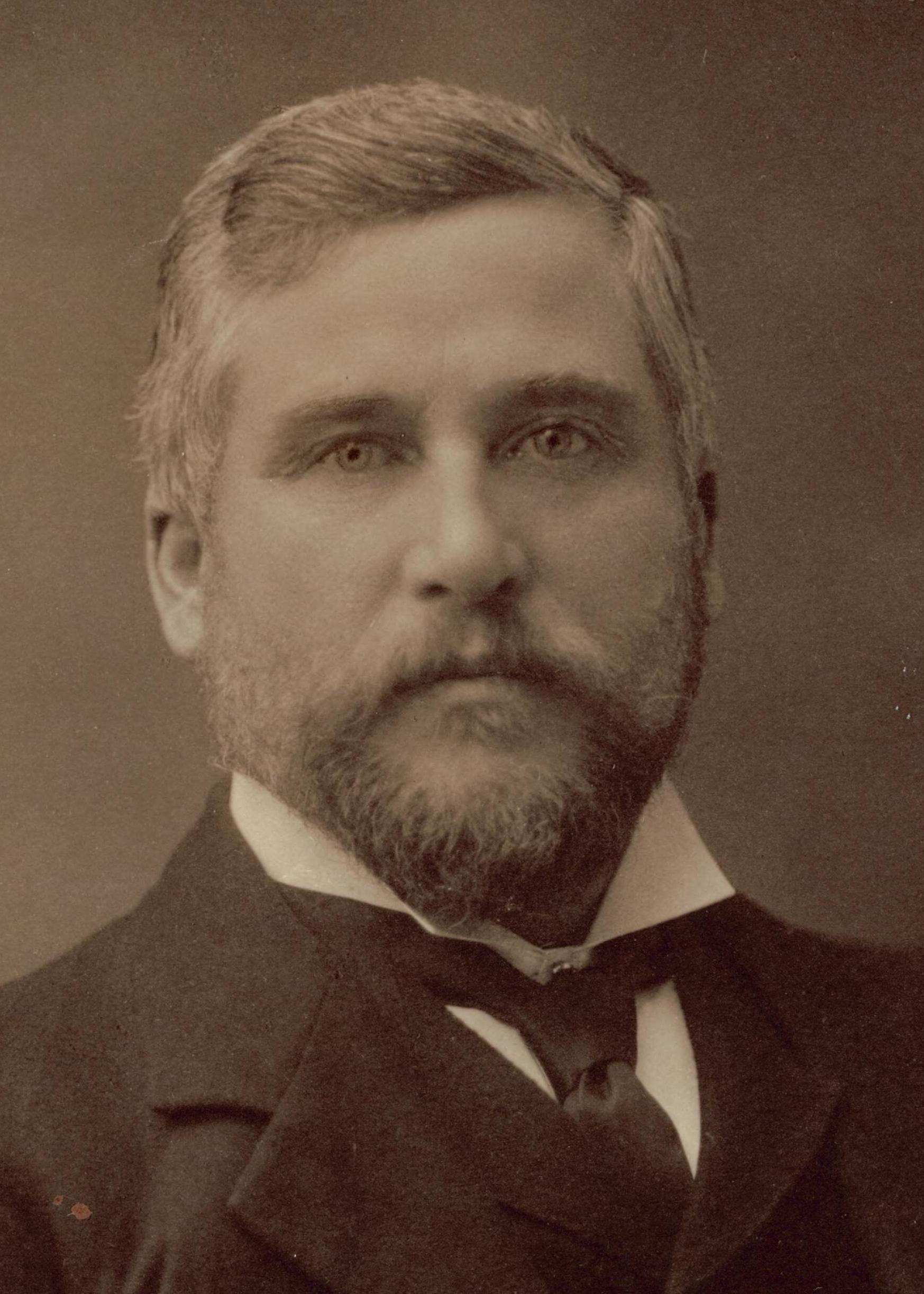

Member of the Australian Parliament for South Sydney
- In office 29 March 1901 – 8 November 1906
- Preceded by: New seat
- Succeeded by: Chris Watson

Member of the Australian Parliament for North Sydney
- In office 13 April 1910 – 4 February 1911
- Preceded by: Dugald Thomson
- Succeeded by: Granville Ryrie

Personal details
- Born: 30 January 1855 Hobart, Tasmania, Australia
- Died: 4 February 1911 (aged 56) Turramurra, New South Wales, Australia
- Party: Free Trade (1901–06); Liberal (1909–11)
- Occupation: Journalist

George Bertrand Edwards (30 January 1855 – 4 February 1911) was an Australian politician. He was a member of the Australian House of Representatives representing the Division of South Sydney for the Free Trade Party from 1901 to 1906 and the Division of North Sydney for the Liberal Party from 1910 until his death in 1911.

Edwards was born and raised in Hobart, Tasmania, the son of a tobacconist and was educated at Christ College. He became a journalist with the Tasmanian Tribune at the age of 20. He later managed the new Hobart office of Launceston newspaper The Examiner c. 1882–83, then in 1884 briefly went to Sydney to run the Peacock Jam Company branch there, but returned to Hobart the next year to run the Launceston office of Hobart newspaper The Mercury. He married the eldest daughter of jam magnate George Peacock in October 1885. He later worked on the general staff of The Mercury, was chief Hansard reporter for two sessions of the Federal Council of Australasia and was editor of the Mercury-owned Tasmanian Mail weekly magazine in 1888–89.

Edwards then managed the Peacock Jam Company's Melbourne branch until purchasing the company's Sydney operations in 1894, subsequently operating that business in partnership with Herbert Peacock. He also purchased 60 acres of land adjoining Ku-ring-gai Chase National Park for a house and fruitgrowing operation. He was a supporter of free trade policies and an unsuccessful Free Trade candidate at the 1898 election.

In 1901, he contested the first federal election as the Free Trade candidate for South Sydney, and won, defeating state Labor leader James McGowen. His platform included support for a White Australia policy and a federal old age pension. In parliament, Edwards chaired the Decimal Coinage Commission and was a member of the Royal Commission on Navigation. Edwards was an early supporter of decimalisation and metrification, and moved several motions calling on Australia to adopt the metric system and a decimal currency. He retired at the 1906 election due to a mix of health concerns and business commitments. Peacock & Co (Edwards' Sydney operation) amalgamated with two other major jam manufacturers to form Henry Jones' Co-operative, Ltd. (later Henry Jones IXL) in early 1910, and later that year he returned to the House of Representatives as the Liberal member for North Sydney.

Edwards was killed when an acetylene gasometer exploded at his property in Turramurra on 4 February 1911. A mechanic named John Graham was also killed in the explosion, which was overheard by Edwards' daughter Annie. The explosion destroyed the brick structure in which the gasometer was housed, and the victims' bodies were found some distance from the gasometer, both with severe head injuries. A coronial inquiry returned a verdict of accidental death.

Parliament of Australia
Preceded by new seat	Member for South Sydney; 1901–1906	Succeeded by Chris Watson
Preceded by Dugald Thomson	Member for North Sydney; 1910–1911	Succeeded by Granville Ryrie
