= Arthur Moverly =

Australian politician

Arthur Henry Moverly (15 March 1887 – 4 April 1956) was an Australian politician.

Born at Gulgong, the son of publican John Moverly, he attended Cleveland Public School and Sydney Technical College before being apprenticed to a builder. He went to the United States in 1907 and studied in Chicago, New York and San Francisco before returning around 1912 and settling at Randwick. On 18 March 1916 he married Elsie Beatrice Whitting, with whom he had three children. A Randwick councillor from 1922 to 1937, he was mayor from 1931 to 1932. Moverly also served on the Metropolitan Water, Sewerage and Drainage Board (1927–56, vice-president 1933) and the State Housing Improvement Board (1937). In 1932 he was elected to the New South Wales Legislative Assembly as the United Australia Party member for Randwick, serving until his defeat in 1941. Moverly died in Sydney in 1956.

Civic offices
| Preceded by John Jennings | Mayor of Randwick; 1931 – 1932 | Succeeded by Silas Garnet Paine |
New South Wales Legislative Assembly
| Preceded by Jack Flanagan | Member for Randwick; 1932–1941 | Succeeded by William Gollan |
