= Division of South Sydney =

Former Australian federal electoral division

South Sydney Australian House of Representatives Division
- Created: 1901
- Abolished: 1934
- Namesake: South Sydney

The Division of South Sydney was an Australian electoral division in the state of New South Wales. It was located in the south of the city of Sydney.

The Division was proclaimed in 1900, and was one of the original 65 divisions to be contested at the first Federal election. At the redistribution of 1 August 1934, it was abolished and replaced by the Division of Watson (1934–1969), in honour of Hon Chris Watson, the first Labor Prime Minister of Australia and South Sydney's second member.

== Members ==
Image	Member	Party	Term	Notes
	George Edwards (1855–1911)	Free Trade	29 March 1901 – 1906	Retired prior to elections in 1906. Later elected to the Division of North Sydney in 1910.
	Chris Watson (1867–1941)	Labor	12 December 1906 – 19 February 1910	Previously held the Division of Bland. Retired.
	Edward Riley (1859–1943)	Labor	13 April 1910 – 19 December 1931	Defeated in 1931 election.
	John Jennings (1878–1968)	United Australia	19 December 1931 – 15 September 1934	Transferred to the Division of Watson after South Sydney was abolished in 1934
