= Gordon Anderson (politician) =

Australian politician (1897–1958)

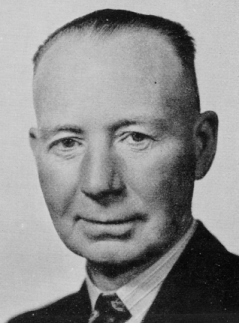

Member of the Australian Parliament for Kingsford-Smith
- In office 10 December 1949 – 4 November 1955
- Preceded by: Division
- Succeeded by: Dan Curtin

Personal details
- Born: 29 December 1897 Barkly, Victoria
- Died: 23 May 1958 (aged 60)
- Party: Australian Labor Party (NSW Branch)
- Occupation: Railway worker, unionist

Gordon Anderson (29 December 1897 – 23 May 1958) was an Australian politician. Born in Barkly, Victoria, he was educated at state schools in Sydney before becoming an employee of New South Wales Government Railways. He was an official in the Railways Salaried Officers' Union and in the Labor Party, and was elected to Waverley Municipal Council, serving four terms as the first Labor Mayor of the council. In 1949 he was elected to the Australian House of Representatives for the Labor Party, representing the new seat of Kingsford-Smith. He held the seat until his retirement in 1955; he died in 1958.

Civic offices
Preceded by Thomas Hogan	Mayor of Waverley; 1943–1945	Succeeded by Herbert Sharman
Preceded by Herbert Sharman	Mayor of Waverley; 1946–1948	Succeeded by Thomas Hogan
Parliament of Australia
New division	Member for Kingsford-Smith; 1949–1955	Succeeded by Dan Curtin
