= Max Falstein =

Australian politician

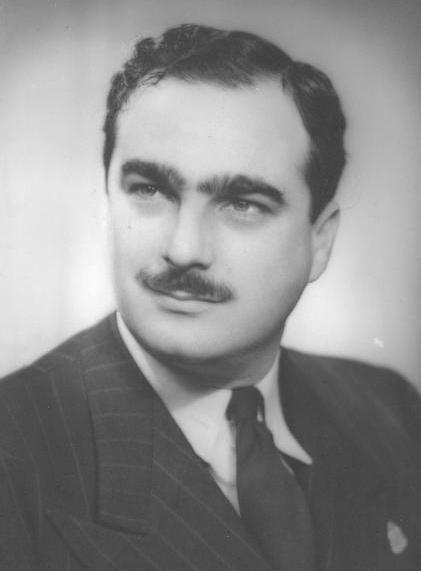

Member of the Australian Parliament for Watson
- In office 21 September 1940 – 10 December 1949
- Preceded by: John Jennings
- Succeeded by: Dan Curtin

Personal details
- Born: Sydney Max Falstein; 30 May 1914 Coffs Harbour, New South Wales
- Died: 18 May 1967 (aged 52) Concord, New South Wales
- Party: Labor (1940–49); Independent (1949)
- Spouse: Ila Brenda Greig
- Occupation: Barrister

Sydney Max Falstein (30 May 1914 – 18 May 1967) was an Australian politician. He was a member of the House of Representatives from 1940 to 1949, representing the New South Wales seat of Watson. He was a member of the Australian Labor Party (ALP) until his disendorsement prior to the 1949 federal election, which he recontested as an independent.

== Early life ==
Falstein was born on 30 May 1914 at Coffs Harbour to Russian grazier Abram Max Falstein and German-born Rosa, Née Goldman. He attended Sydney Boys' High (1926–27) and Sydney Grammar schools, and later studied for a Bachelor of Arts and a law degree at the University of Sydney. On 13 March 1937 he married nurse Ila Brenda Greig at Darlinghurst, and was thus estranged from his Jewish mother. He spent several years in New Zealand before returning to Australia; he was admitted to the New South Wales Bar in 1940.

== Federal politics ==
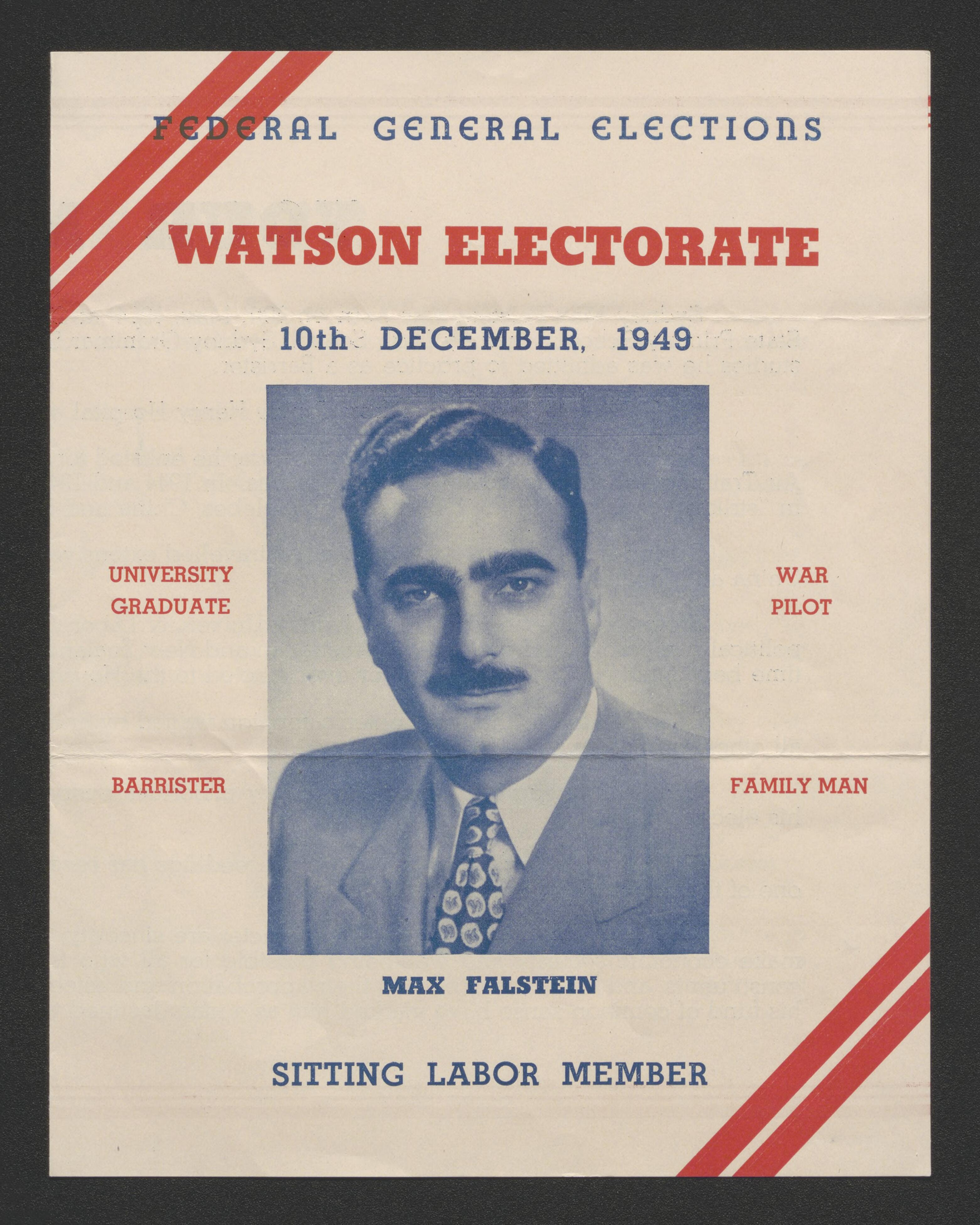
Campaign material used by Falstein at the 1949 federal election

Falstein was first involved in politics in New Zealand, where he was an organiser for the New Zealand Labour Party. In Australia, he was elected to the Australian House of Representatives in 1940 for the seat of Watson, representing the Australian Labor Party. In parliament he became associated with Arthur Calwell and others who opposed John Curtin's leadership. After John Curtin became Prime Minister, Falstein openly clashed with him over issues concerning the Royal Australian Air Force in 1944.

Falstein had enlisted in the RAAF on 18 July 1942; he was convicted of using insubordinate language to a superior in September of that year and was sentenced to twenty-eight days detention. He qualified as a pilot and completed an operational tour from 1944 to 1945 in the south-west Pacific.

After the Second World War Falstein became involved in business. He was convicted of falsifying documents to understate imported wristwatches' value in 1948 and fined. Consequently, the ALP did not endorse him for Watson in the 1949 election. On 22 October 1949, Falstein announced that he had resigned from the ALP and would re-contest Watson as an independent. He was unsuccessful. His only further political acts were to support Menzies' Communist Party dissolution attempt; a marked anti-communist, he had nevertheless supported the recognition of Communist China.

== Later life ==
Falstein was declared bankrupt on 12 August 1958; his appeals to the courts failed. He returned to the New South Wales Bar in 1961. In his final years he suffered from hypertension and diabetes, and he died on 18 May 1967 of cerebral thrombosis at Concord. He was survived by his wife, a daughter, and three of his four sons.

Parliament of Australia
Preceded by John Jennings	Member for Watson; 1940–1949	Succeeded by Dan Curtin
