= Electoral district of Randwick =

Former state electoral district of New South Wales, Australia

Randwick was an Australian electoral district of the Legislative Assembly in the Australian state of New South Wales, originally created with the abolition of multi-member constituencies in 1894 from part of Paddington, along with Waverley and Woollahra. It was named after and including the Sydney suburb of Randwick. In 1920, with the introduction of proportional representation, it was absorbed into Eastern Suburbs. Randwick was recreated in 1927 and abolished in 1971 and partly replaced by Waverley.

== Members for Randwick ==
First incarnation (1894–1920)
| Member | Party | Term |
|---|---|---|
| David Storey | Free Trade | 1894–1901 |
| David Storey | Liberal Reform | 1901–1910 |
| David Storey | Independent Liberal | 1910–1913 |
| David Storey | Liberal Reform | 1913–1917 |
| David Storey | Nationalist | 1917–1920 |
Second incarnation (1927–1971)
| Member | Party | Term |
| Ernest Tresidder | Nationalist | 1927–1930 |
| Jack Flanagan | Labor | 1930–1932 |
| Arthur Moverly | United Australia | 1932–1941 |
| William Gollan | Labor | 1941–1962 |
| Lionel Bowen | Labor | 1962–1969 |
| Laurie Brereton | Labor | 1970–1971 |

== Election results ==
1970 Randwick by-election Saturday 14 February
| Party | Candidate | Votes | % | ±% |
|---|---|---|---|---|
| Labor | Laurie Brereton | 13,201 | 61.5 | +8.9 |
| Liberal | John McLaughlin | 8,252 | 38.5 | −5.1 |
| Total formal votes | | 21,453 | 97.3 | +0.5 |
| Informal votes | | 581 | 2.6 | +0.5 |
| Turnout | | 20,034 | 79.5 | −13.3 |
| Labor hold | | Swing | +8.1 | |

Lionel Bowen (Labor) resigned to successfully contest the 1969 election for Kingsford Smith.
