= Hubert O'Connell =

Australian politician

Hubert David O'Connell (12 April 1906 – 18 December 1971) was an Australian politician.

Born in Harden to publican John O'Connell and Johanna Leahy, O'Connell was educated at Harden and Goulburn before studying pharmacy at the University of Sydney. He worked as a pharmacist in Maroubra from 1930 to 1967 and also owned property at Goulburn. He served on Randwick Council from 1941 to 1944. On 18 June 1958 he married Merle Knight, with whom he had a son. Originally a member of the Nationalist Party and its successor the United Australia Party, he stood for elections as an Independent Labor candidate in 1943, as a Liberal in 1950 and 1954 and as an Independent in 1955. When he was elected to the New South Wales Legislative Council in 1967 he joined the Independent Labor Group. He held the seat until his death at Randwick in 1971.
