= John Jennings (Australian politician) =

Australian politician

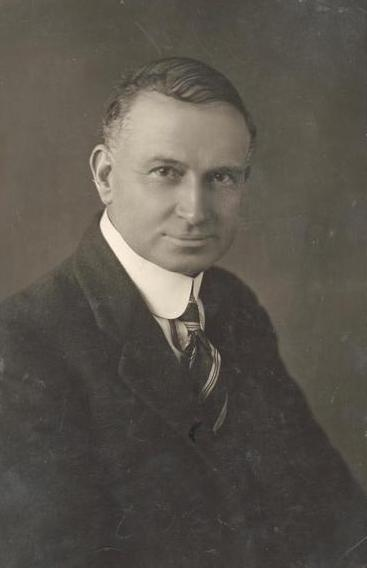

Member of the Australian Parliament for South Sydney
- In office 19 December 1931 – 15 September 1934
- Preceded by: Edward Riley
- Succeeded by: Seat abolished

Member of the Australian Parliament for Watson
- In office 15 September 1934 – 21 September 1940
- Preceded by: New seat
- Succeeded by: Max Falstein

Personal details
- Born: 19 December 1878 Melbourne, Victoria, Australia
- Died: 20 December 1968 (aged 90)
- Party: United Australia Party
- Occupation: Retailer
- Awards: Member of the Order of the British Empire

Military service
- Allegiance: Victoria
- Branch/service: Victorian Mounted Rifles
- Years of service: 1899–1901
- Rank: Private
- Battles/wars: Second Boer War

John Thomas Jennings, MBE (19 December 1878 – 20 December 1968) was an Australian politician. Born in Melbourne, he attended state schools before becoming a retailer of dental supplies. He underwent military service from 1899 to 1901 and served in South Africa during the Second Boer War with the Victorian Mounted Rifles. In 1931, he was elected to the Australian House of Representatives as the United Australia Party member for South Sydney in New South Wales. South Sydney was abolished in 1934 and replaced with Watson; Jennings contested Watson and won. He held the seat until 1940, when he was defeated by Labor candidate Max Falstein. Jennings died in 1968.

Between 1928 and 1958 Jennings served as National President of the Australian Dental Trade Association (ADTA), which now trades as the Australian Dental Industry Association (ADIA). He remains that organization's longest serving federal president.

Jennings was the brother of Albert Victor Jennings, founder of the AVJennings building company and the uncle of Doug Jennings.

Civic offices
Preceded by John Dunningham	Mayor of Randwick; 1929–1930	Succeeded by Arthur Moverly
Parliament of Australia
Preceded by Edward Riley	Member for South Sydney; 1931–1934	Succeeded by Seat abolished
Preceded by New seat	Member for Watson; 1934–1940	Succeeded by Max Falstein
