= Division of Kingsford Smith =

Australian federal electoral division

Coordinates: 33.949°S 151.231°E

Kingsford Smith Australian House of Representatives Division
- Interactive map of electorate boundaries from the 2025 federal election
- Created: 1949
- MP: Matt Thistlethwaite
- Party: Labor
- Namesake: Sir Charles Kingsford Smith
- Electors: 117,455 (2025)
- Area: 61 km^{2} (23.6 sq mi)
- Demographic: Inner metropolitan
Electorates around Kingsford Smith:
Grayndler	Sydney	Wentworth
Barton	Kingsford Smith	Tasman Sea
Cook	Cook	Tasman Sea

The Division of Kingsford Smith is an Australian electoral division in the state of New South Wales. It is located south and south-east of the Sydney CBD, comprising most of the City of Randwick and Bayside Council. It is currently represented by Labor MP Matt Thistlethwaite.

== History ==
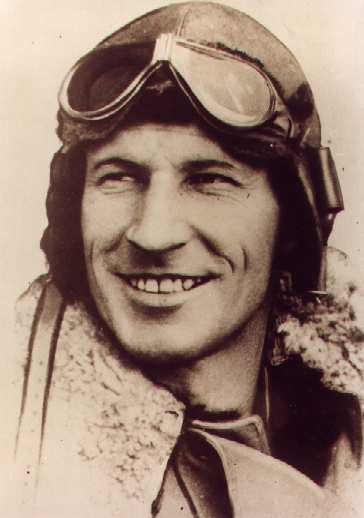
Sir Charles Kingsford Smith, the division's namesake

The division is named after Sir Charles Kingsford Smith, a pioneer aviator, who was the first pilot to fly across the Pacific Ocean. The Kingsford Smith International Airport (Sydney International), and the suburb of Kingsford, both of which are located within the division, are also named after him. The division was proclaimed at the redistribution of 11 May 1949, and was first contested at the 1949 federal election. In the 1968 redistribution, it absorbed the neighbouring division of Watson (1934–1969), which was abolished.

Kingsford Smith has been in Labor hands for its entire existence. However, demographic changes since 2010 have made the seat much less secure for Labor. It has previously been held by Lionel Bowen, a minister in the Whitlam government, Deputy Leader of the Labor Party from 1977 to 1990, and Deputy Prime Minister for most of the Hawke government, and by Laurie Brereton, a minister in the Keating government. It was then held by Peter Garrett, a former lead singer of the Australian rock band Midnight Oil, former President of the Australian Conservation Foundation, and a minister in the Rudd and Gillard governments. Garrett announced his retirement on 26 June 2013.

The Division was originally known as the Division of Kingsford-Smith (with a hyphen), based upon a misspelling of Sir Charles's surname. However, this was corrected at the redistribution in 2001.

The current Member for Kingsford Smith, since the 2013 federal election, is Matt Thistlethwaite, a member of the Australian Labor Party who resigned from the Senate prior to the election.

== Geography ==
The division is located to the south and south-east of Sydney CBD, on the north shore of Botany Bay, and the coast of the Tasman Sea. The division includes the suburbs of Banksmeadow, Botany, Brighton-Le-Sands, Chifley, Daceyville, East Botany, Eastgardens, Eastlakes, Hillsdale, Kensington, Kingsford, Kyeemagh, La Perouse, Little Bay, Malabar, Maroubra, Maroubra Junction, Mascot, Matraville, Monterey, Pagewood, Phillip Bay, Port Botany, Ramsgate Beach and South Coogee; along with parts of Coogee, Randwick and Rosebery. Bare Island, Prince Henry Hospital, Sydney Airport and the University of New South Wales are also located in the electorate.

Since 1984, federal electoral division boundaries in Australia have been determined at redistributions by a redistribution committee appointed by the Australian Electoral Commission. Redistributions occur for the boundaries of divisions in a particular state, and they occur every seven years, or sooner if a state's representation entitlement changes or when divisions of a state are malapportioned.

== Members ==
Image	Member	Party	Term	Notes
	Gordon Anderson (1897–1958)	Labor	10 December 1949 – 4 November 1955	Retired
	Dan Curtin (1898–1980)	Labor	10 December 1955 – 29 September 1969	Previously held the Division of Watson. Retired
	Lionel Bowen (1922–2012)	Labor	25 October 1969 – 19 February 1990	Previously held the New South Wales Legislative Assembly seat of Randwick. Served as minister under Whitlam and Hawke. Served as Deputy Prime Minister under Hawke. Retired
	Laurie Brereton (1946–)	Labor	24 March 1990 – 31 August 2004	Previously held the New South Wales Legislative Assembly seat of Heffron. Served as minister under Keating. Retired
	Peter Garrett (1953–)	Labor	9 October 2004 – 5 August 2013	Served as minister under Rudd and Gillard. Retired
	Matt Thistlethwaite (1972–)	Labor	7 September 2013 – present	Previously a member of the Senate. Incumbent. Currently a minister under Albanese

== Election results ==
2025 Australian federal election: Kingsford Smith
Party	Candidate	Votes	%	±%
Labor	Matt Thistlethwaite	50,346	50.79	+3.45
Liberal	Brad Cole	25,924	26.15	−3.46
Greens	Keiron Brown	13,440	13.56	−2.20
One Nation	Mark Jelic	5,865	5.92	+2.44
Independent	Elsa Parker	3,557	3.59	+3.59
Total formal votes		99,132	94.18	−1.05
Informal votes		6,126	5.82	+1.05
Turnout		105,258	89.66	+0.22
Two-party-preferred result
Labor	Matt Thistlethwaite	66,604	67.19	+3.88
Liberal	Brad Cole	32,528	32.81	−3.88
Labor hold		Swing	+3.88	
