= Dan Curtin (politician) =

Australian politician (1898–1980)

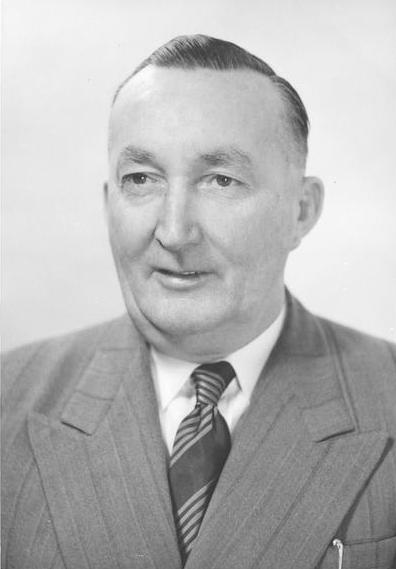

Member of the Australian Parliament for Watson
- In office 10 December 1949 – 10 December 1955
- Preceded by: Max Falstein
- Succeeded by: Jim Cope

Member of the Australian Parliament for Kingsford-Smith
- In office 10 December 1955 – 29 September 1969
- Preceded by: Gordon Anderson
- Succeeded by: Lionel Bowen

Personal details
- Born: Daniel James Curtin; 14 February 1898 Sydney
- Died: 4 December 1980 (aged 82)
- Party: Australian Labor Party
- Occupation: Boilermaker

Daniel James Curtin (14 February 1898 – 4 December 1980) was an Australian politician. Born in Sydney, he was educated at a Catholic primary school before becoming a boilermaker and organiser of the Boilermakers' Society. In 1949, he was preselected by the Australian Labor Party to contest the safe Labor seat of Watson, displacing the sitting member, Max Falstein, who contested the seat as an independent. Curtin won the seat, which he held until 1955, when he transferred to the seat of Kingsford-Smith. He held Kingsford-Smith until 1969, when he retired from politics. Curtin provided an opportunity for several Indigenous Australian women to become involved in politics.

Parliament of Australia
Preceded by Max Falstein	Member for Watson; 1949–1955	Succeeded by Jim Cope
Preceded by Gordon Anderson	Member for Kingsford-Smith; 1955–1969	Succeeded by Lionel Bowen
