= Lionel Bowen =

Australian politician (1922–2012)

The Honourable Lionel Bowen AC
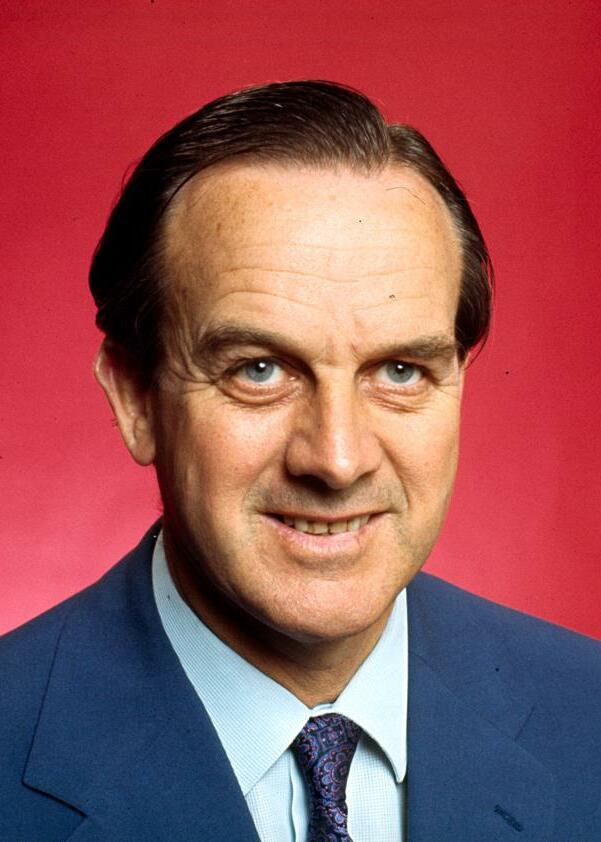
- Official portrait, 1973

Deputy Prime Minister of Australia
- In office 11 March 1983 – 4 April 1990
- Prime Minister: Bob Hawke
- Preceded by: Doug Anthony
- Succeeded by: Paul Keating

Deputy Leader of the Labor Party
- In office 22 December 1977 – 4 April 1990
- Leader: Bill Hayden; Bob Hawke
- Preceded by: Tom Uren
- Succeeded by: Paul Keating

Manager of Opposition Business
- In office 10 November 1980 – 11 March 1983
- Leader: Bill Hayden; Bob Hawke
- Preceded by: Chris Hurford
- Succeeded by: Ian Sinclair

Attorney-General of Australia
- In office 13 December 1984 – 4 April 1990
- Leader: Bob Hawke
- Preceded by: Gareth Evans
- Succeeded by: Michael Duffy

Vice-President of the Executive Council
- In office 14 July 1983 – 24 July 1987
- Leader: Bob Hawke
- Preceded by: Mick Young
- Succeeded by: Mick Young

Minister for Trade
- In office 11 March 1983 – 13 December 1984
- Leader: Bob Hawke
- Preceded by: Doug Anthony
- Succeeded by: John Dawkins

Minister for Manufacturing Industry
- In office 6 June 1975 – 11 November 1975
- Leader: Gough Whitlam
- Preceded by: Jim McClelland
- Succeeded by: Bob Cotton

Special Minister of State
- In office 30 November 1973 – 6 June 1975
- Leader: Gough Whitlam
- Preceded by: Don Willesee
- Succeeded by: Doug McClelland

Postmaster-General
- In office 19 December 1972 – 12 June 1974
- Leader: Gough Whitlam
- Preceded by: Lance Barnard
- Succeeded by: Reg Bishop

Member of the Australian Parliament for Kingsford Smith
- In office 25 October 1969 – 19 February 1990
- Preceded by: Dan Curtin
- Succeeded by: Laurie Brereton

Personal details
- Born: 28 December 1922 Ultimo, New South Wales, Australia
- Died: 1 April 2012 (aged 89) Sydney, New South Wales, Australia
- Party: Labor
- Spouse: Claire Clement
- Children: 8
- Education: University of Sydney
- Occupation: Solicitor

Military service
- Allegiance: Australia
- Branch/service: Australian Army
- Years of service: 1941–1945
- Rank: Corporal

Lionel Frost Bowen AC (28 December 1922 – 1 April 2012) was an Australian politician. He was the deputy leader of the Australian Labor Party (ALP) from 1977 to 1990 and served as the sixth deputy prime minister of Australia in the Hawke government from 1983 to 1990.

Bowen was born in Sydney to a working-class family. He served in the Australian Army during World War II and subsequently studied law at the University of Sydney. He was elected mayor of Randwick in 1948 and served in the New South Wales Legislative Assembly from 1962 to 1969. Bowen was elected to the House of Representatives at the 1969 federal election, representing the seat of Kingsford Smith. He served as Postmaster-General (1972–1974), Special Minister of State (1973–1975) and Minister for Manufacturing Industry (1975) in the Whitlam government, before being elected deputy leader to Bill Hayden in 1977. He retained the position when Bob Hawke was elected leader in 1983 and became deputy prime minister after Labor won the 1983 election. He served as Minister for Trade (1983–1984) and Attorney-General (1984–1990) until his retirement from politics in 1990, and was later chair of the National Gallery of Australia.

== Early life ==
Bowen was born in the Sydney suburb of Ultimo. His father left the family when Bowen was aged 10 years and Bowen's mother looked after her invalid brother and elderly mother, while working as a cleaner. Bowen was educated at Cleveland Street public school, Marcellin College Randwick and Sydney University where he graduated with a LLB in 1946 and became a solicitor. He served in the Second Australian Imperial Force from 1941 to 1945, reaching the rank of corporal.

== Political career ==
Bowen was elected to Randwick Council and became Mayor in 1948. He served in the New South Wales Legislative Assembly from 1962 to 1969, representing Randwick, before being elected to the Parliament of Australia in 1969, to the seat of Kingsford Smith in the House of Representatives. From 1972 to 1975, he served successively as Minister for Manufacturing Industry, Special Minister of State and Postmaster-General in the Whitlam cabinet.

Bowen played a relatively quiet role in politics, preferring to work behind the scenes. A significant achievement came when he served as acting education minister in the Whitlam government (during the illness and hospitalization of incumbent education minister Kim Beazley Senior), when he managed to split the opposition and win National Party support in the Senate for needs-based funding for non-government schools.

When Whitlam resigned as Labor leader after his defeat at the 1977 election, Bowen contested the party leadership but was defeated by Bill Hayden and became Deputy Leader. He retained this position when Bob Hawke became Leader in February 1983. When Hawke won the March 1983 election, Bowen became Deputy Prime Minister and Minister for Trade in the first Hawke Ministry. In July 1983, he was appointed Vice-President of the Executive Council and in the second Hawke ministry, he became Attorney-General, losing the Trade portfolio.

In 1988, Bowen sponsored four referendums to reform the Australian Constitution (see 1988 Australian referendum), but all were defeated. He retired from federal politics prior to the March 1990 election, and was succeeded as Deputy Prime Minister by Paul Keating.

== Post political career ==
Bowen served as Chairman of the National Gallery of Australia between 1990 and 1995 and shared a strong interest in horseracing.

In 1990, he was awarded the New Zealand 1990 Commemoration Medal, and in 1991, he was appointed a Companion of the Order of Australia "in recognition of service to the community and politics." In 2001, he received a Centenary Medal.

== Personal life ==
Bowen and his wife, Claire, married in 1953 and had three daughters and five sons. He lived in the same home in Kensington for 73 years. His son, Tony, was a mayor of the City of Randwick.

Bowen died from pneumonia on 1 April 2012. after years afflicted with Alzheimer's disease. He was given a state funeral on 11 April 2012.

== Legacy ==
The Family Court of Australia and the Federal Magistrates Court are located in the Lionel Bowen Building in Goulburn Street, Sydney. The City of Randwick main library is known as the Lionel Bowen Library. Lionel Bowen Park is situated in the suburb of Mascot.

== Gallery ==
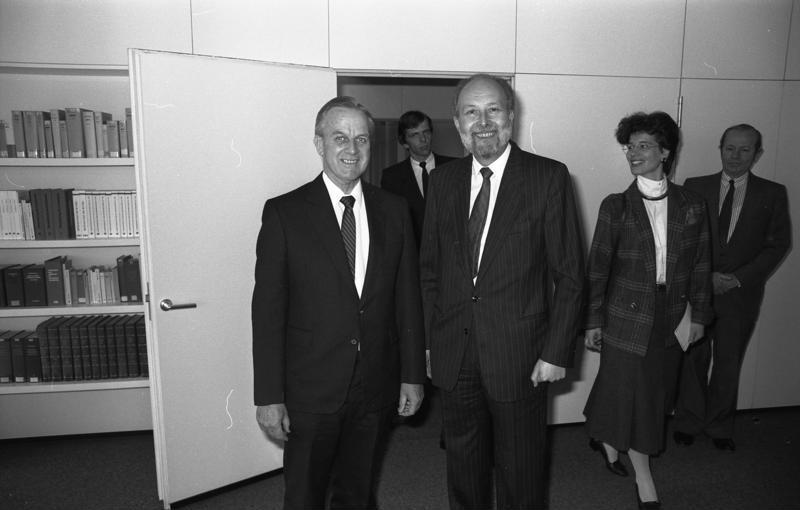
Bowen with German Federal Minister of Justice Hans A. Engelhard in April 1987

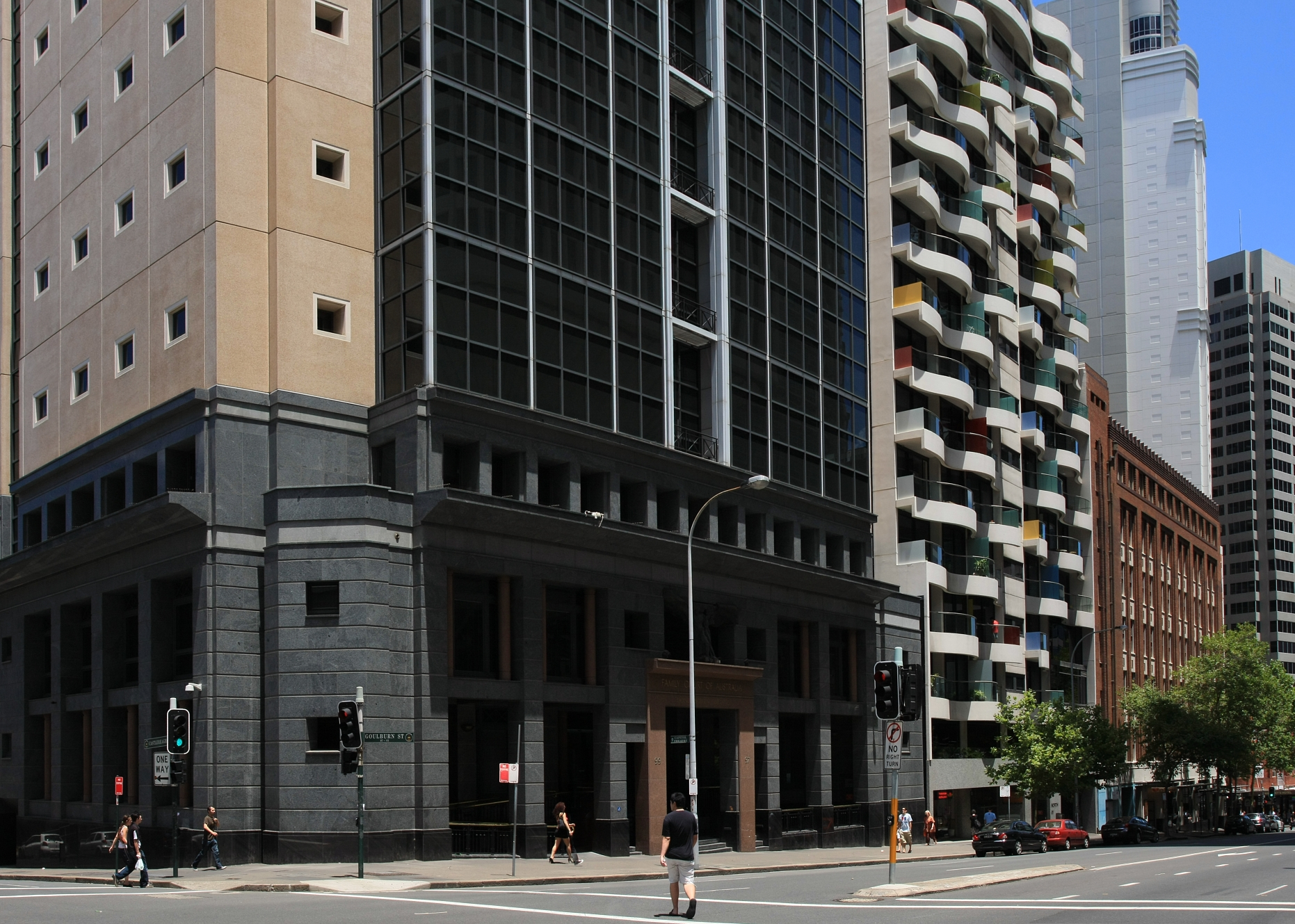
The Lionel Bowen Building in Goulburn Street, Sydney

Civic offices
Preceded by George Nicholas Elias Dan	Mayor of Randwick; 1951	Succeeded by Lou Walsh
Preceded by Harry Jensen	Mayor of Randwick; 1955	Succeeded by Ranville Ashmore Popplewell
Parliament of Australia
Preceded by Daniel Curtin	Member for Kingsford Smith; 1969–1990	Succeeded by Laurie Brereton
Political offices
Preceded by Alan Hulme	Postmaster-General; 1972–1974	Succeeded by Reg Bishop
Preceded by Doug Anthony	Deputy Prime Minister of Australia; 1983–1990	Succeeded by Paul Keating
Preceded by Doug Anthony	Minister for Trade; 1983–1984	Succeeded by John Dawkins
Preceded by Gareth Evans	Attorney-General; 1984–1990	Succeeded by Michael Duffy
Party political offices
Preceded by Tom Uren	Deputy Leader of the Labor Party; 1977–1990	Succeeded by Paul Keating
