= Electoral results for the district of Coogee =

Election results for Coogee, New South Wales, Australia

Coogee, an electoral district of the Legislative Assembly in the Australian state of New South Wales, was created in 1927.

== Members for Coogee ==
Election	Member	Party
1927	Hyman Goldstein	Nationalist
1928 by	John Dunningham	Nationalist
1930	John Dunningham	Nationalist
1932	John Dunningham	United Australia
1935	John Dunningham	United Australia
1938 by	Thomas Mutch	United Australia
1941	Lou Cunningham	Labor
1944	Lou Cunningham	Labor
1947	Lou Cunningham	Labor
1948 by	Kevin Ellis	Liberal
1953	Lou Walsh	Labor
1956	Kevin Ellis	Liberal
1962	Lou Walsh	Labor
1965	Kevin Ellis	Liberal
1968	Kevin Ellis	Liberal
1971	Kevin Ellis	Liberal
1973	Ross Freeman	Liberal
1974 by	Michael Cleary	Labor
1976	Michael Cleary	Labor
1978	Michael Cleary	Labor
1981	Michael Cleary	Labor
1984	Michael Cleary	Labor
1988	Michael Cleary	Labor
1991	Ernie Page	Labor
1995	Ernie Page	Labor
1999	Ernie Page	Labor
2003	Paul Pearce	Labor
2007	Paul Pearce	Labor
2011	Bruce Notley-Smith	Liberal
2015	Bruce Notley-Smith	Liberal
2019	Marjorie O'Neill	Labor
2023	Marjorie O'Neill	Labor

== Election results ==
=== Elections in the 2020s ===
==== 2023 ====
2023 New South Wales state election: Coogee
Party	Candidate	Votes	%	±%
Labor	Marjorie O'Neill	22,153	45.2	+10.7
Liberal	Kylie von Muenster	16,121	32.9	−7.5
Greens	Rafaela Pandolfini	7,927	16.2	+1.2
Sustainable Australia	Lluisa Murray	1,058	2.2	+0.8
Informed Medical Options	Alicia Mosquera	924	1.9	+1.9
Animal Justice	Simon Garrod	821	1.7	−0.2
Total formal votes		49,004	98.1	+0.1
Informal votes		930	1.9	−0.1
Turnout		49,934	83.9	−1.4
Two-party-preferred result
Labor	Marjorie O'Neill	28,440	62.3	+10.0
Liberal	Kylie von Muenster	17,221	37.7	−10.0
Labor hold		Swing	+10.0	

=== Elections in the 2010s ===
==== 2019 ====
2019 New South Wales state election: Coogee
Party	Candidate	Votes	%	±%
Liberal	Bruce Notley-Smith	18,937	41.14	−5.42
Labor	Marjorie O'Neill	15,819	34.36	+1.82
Greens	Lindsay Shurey	6,687	14.53	−4.06
Keep Sydney Open	Joseph O'Donoghue	2,232	4.85	+4.85
Animal Justice	Simon Garrod	804	1.75	+1.75
Sustainable Australia	Lluisa Murray	650	1.41	+1.41
Small Business	Ciaran O'Brien	473	1.03	+1.03
Shooters, Fishers, Farmers	Joshua Turnbull	433	0.94	+0.94
Total formal votes		46,035	98.13	+0.48
Informal votes		879	1.87	−0.48
Turnout		46,914	85.24	−2.09
Two-party-preferred result
Labor	Marjorie O'Neill	21,510	51.64	+4.56
Liberal	Bruce Notley-Smith	20,141	48.36	−4.56
Labor gain from Liberal		Swing	+4.56	

==== 2015 ====
2015 New South Wales state election: Coogee
Party	Candidate	Votes	%	±%
Liberal	Bruce Notley-Smith	21,564	46.6	−1.1
Labor	Paul Pearce	15,073	32.5	+6.8
Greens	Lindsay Shurey	8,609	18.6	−2.8
No Land Tax	Victoria Gervay-Ruben	612	1.3	+1.3
Christian Democrats	Linda Dinkha	464	1.0	−0.4
Total formal votes		46,322	97.6	+0.5
Informal votes		1,117	2.4	−0.5
Turnout		47,439	87.3	−1.3
Two-party-preferred result
Liberal	Bruce Notley-Smith	22,517	52.9	−5.4
Labor	Paul Pearce	20,031	47.1	+5.4
Liberal hold		Swing	−5.4	

==== 2011 ====
2011 New South Wales state election: Coogee
Party	Candidate	Votes	%	±%
Liberal	Bruce Notley-Smith	20,224	47.1	+11.4
Labor	Paul Pearce	10,828	25.2	−13.8
Greens	Sue Doran	9,449	22.0	+0.9
Independent	Nathan Jones	956	2.2	+2.2
Independent	Stuart Burney	868	2.0	+2.0
Christian Democrats	Andrew McGowan	581	1.4	+1.4
Total formal votes		42,906	97.6	+0.1
Informal votes		1,035	2.4	−0.1
Turnout		43,941	89.4	+0.5
Two-party-preferred result
Liberal	Bruce Notley-Smith	21,987	58.2	+15.5
Labor	Paul Pearce	15,762	41.8	−15.5
Liberal gain from Labor		Swing	+15.5	

=== Elections in the 2000s ===
==== 2007 ====
2007 New South Wales state election: Coogee
Party	Candidate	Votes	%	±%
Labor	Paul Pearce	15,623	39.0	−6.9
Liberal	Jonathon Flegg	14,323	35.8	+5.0
Greens	Kelly Marks	8,457	21.1	+3.2
Democrats	Nicole Tillotson	1,138	2.8	+0.5
Unity	Yuan Wu	488	1.2	+0.2
Total formal votes		40,029	97.6	−0.4
Informal votes		989	2.4	+0.4
Turnout		41,018	88.9	
Two-party-preferred result
Labor	Paul Pearce	20,775	57.2	−6.4
Liberal	Jonathon Flegg	15,521	42.8	+6.4
Labor hold		Swing	−6.4	

==== 2003 ====
2003 New South Wales state election: Coogee
Party	Candidate	Votes	%	±%
Labor	Paul Pearce	16,361	44.4	−5.0
Liberal	David McBride	11,669	31.7	−1.0
Greens	Murray Matson	6,848	18.6	+9.3
Democrats	Lindy Morrison	870	2.4	−3.3
Independent	Barry Watterson	773	2.1	+2.1
Unity	Lisa Li	300	0.8	+0.8
Total formal votes		36,821	98.1	+0.0
Informal votes		727	1.9	−0.0
Turnout		37,548	87.8	
Two-party-preferred result
Labor	Paul Pearce	20,728	62.6	+0.3
Liberal	David McBride	12,381	37.4	−0.3
Labor hold		Swing	+0.3	

=== Elections in the 1990s ===
==== 1999 ====
1999 New South Wales state election: Coogee
Party	Candidate	Votes	%	±%
Labor	Ernie Page	18,901	49.4	+5.4
Liberal	Kevin Junee	12,498	32.7	−6.6
Greens	Murray Matson	3,578	9.3	−0.1
Democrats	Harry Crow	2,180	5.7	+2.5
One Nation	Darrel Mullins	910	2.4	+2.4
AAFI	Les Black	203	0.5	−1.6
Total formal votes		38,270	98.1	+2.3
Informal votes		761	1.9	−2.3
Turnout		39,031	89.7	
Two-party-preferred result
Labor	Ernie Page	22,338	62.3	+6.8
Liberal	Kevin Junee	13,539	37.7	−6.8
Labor hold		Swing	+6.8	

==== 1995 ====
1995 New South Wales state election: Coogee
Party	Candidate	Votes	%	±%
Labor	Ernie Page	15,002	44.5	+1.0
Liberal	Margaret Martin	13,013	38.6	−2.4
Greens	Murray Matson	3,131	9.3	+9.3
Democrats	Marie Brown	1,045	3.1	−1.9
AAFI	Shane Scevity	797	2.4	+2.4
Independent	Barry Doosey	472	1.4	+1.4
Natural Law	Jacinta Lynch	240	0.7	+0.7
Total formal votes		33,700	95.9	+2.2
Informal votes		1,426	4.1	−2.2
Turnout		35,126	91.4	
Two-party-preferred result
Labor	Ernie Page	17,924	56.1	+4.5
Liberal	Margaret Martin	14,024	43.9	−4.5
Labor hold		Swing	+4.5	

==== 1991 ====
1991 New South Wales state election: Coogee
Party	Candidate	Votes	%	±%
Labor	Ernie Page	14,013	43.5	+0.1
Liberal	Allan Andrews	13,215	41.0	−1.4
Democrats	Peter Feltis	1,625	5.0	−0.3
Independent	Claude Danzey	1,335	4.1	+4.1
Independent	Charles Matthews	1,089	3.4	+3.4
Independent	Jack Dillon	957	3.0	+3.0
Total formal votes		32,234	93.8	−3.4
Informal votes		2,135	6.2	+3.4
Turnout		34,369	90.8	
Two-party-preferred result
Labor	Ernie Page	15,994	51.6	+0.7
Liberal	Allan Andrews	15,021	48.4	−0.7
Labor hold		Swing	+0.7	

=== Elections in the 1980s ===
==== 1988 ====
1988 New South Wales state election: Coogee
Party	Candidate	Votes	%	±%
Labor	Michael Cleary	11,739	42.1	−10.4
Liberal	Margaret Martin	11,416	41.0	+0.3
Independent	John Buchanan	3,568	12.8	+12.8
Democrats	Laurence Gration	877	3.1	−3.3
Independent	Stephen Muller	269	1.0	+1.0
Total formal votes		27,869	96.7	−0.7
Informal votes		948	3.3	+0.7
Turnout		28,817	91.5	
Two-party-preferred result
Labor	Michael Cleary	13,484	51.2	−5.4
Liberal	Margaret Martin	12,855	48.8	+5.4
Labor hold		Swing	−5.4	

==== 1984 ====
1984 New South Wales state election: Coogee
Party	Candidate	Votes	%	±%
Labor	Michael Cleary	13,674	52.8	−11.5
Liberal	Ken Finn	10,521	40.6	+7.5
Democrats	Gavan Schneider	1,708	6.6	+6.6
Total formal votes		25,903	97.5	+1.0
Informal votes		658	2.5	−1.0
Turnout		26,561	89.6	+2.5
Two-party-preferred result
Labor	Michael Cleary		56.8	−9.1
Liberal	Ken Finn		43.2	+9.1
Labor hold		Swing	−9.1	

==== 1981 ====
1981 New South Wales state election: Coogee
Party	Candidate	Votes	%	±%
Labor	Michael Cleary	16,668	64.3	+0.9
Liberal	Kenneth Finn	8,576	33.1	+1.0
Independent	Michael Gluyas	665	2.6	+2.6
Total formal votes		25,909	96.5	
Informal votes		933	3.5	
Turnout		26,842	87.1	
Two-party-preferred result
Labor	Michael Cleary	16,768	65.9	−0.5
Liberal	Kenneth Finn	8,676	34.1	+0.5
Labor hold		Swing	−0.5	

=== Elections in the 1970s ===
==== 1978 ====
1978 New South Wales state election: Coogee
Party	Candidate	Votes	%	±%
Labor	Michael Cleary	17,893	63.4	+9.7
Liberal	David Kinsman	9,059	32.1	−14.2
Democrats	Leslie Reiss	1,254	4.5	+4.5
Total formal votes		28,206	97.8	−0.1
Informal votes		625	2.2	+0.1
Turnout		28,831	88.6	−1.1
Two-party-preferred result
Labor	Michael Cleary	18,729	66.4	+12.7
Liberal	David Kinsman	9,477	33.6	−12.7
Labor hold		Swing	+12.7	

==== 1976 ====
1976 New South Wales state election: Coogee
Party	Candidate	Votes	%	±%
Labor	Michael Cleary	16,265	53.7	+8.2
Liberal	Phillip Billings	14,036	46.3	+1.2
Total formal votes		30,301	97.9	+0.8
Informal votes		662	2.1	−0.8
Turnout		30,963	89.7	+1.3
Labor gain from Liberal		Swing	+3.7	

==== 1974 by-election ====
1974 Coogee by-election Saturday 20 July
Party	Candidate	Votes	%	±%
Labor	Michael Cleary	12,521	46.87	+4.5
Liberal	Ross Freeman	12,823	48.00	+1.4
Australia	Ann Sutherland	1,111	4.16	
Independent	F C Keep	161	0.60	
Independent	Bernard Forshaw	89	0.33	
National Socialist	Ross May	11	0.04	
Total formal votes		29,716	97.82	
Informal votes		596	2.18	
Turnout		27,312	81.17	
Two-party-preferred result
Labor	Michael Cleary	13,385	50.10	+3.0
Liberal	Ross Freeman	12,823	49.90	−3.0
Labor gain from Liberal		Swing	+3.00'"`UNIQ−−ref−0000009B−QINU`"'	

The Court of Disputed Returns overturned the result of the 1973 Coogee election.

==== 1973 ====
1973 New South Wales state election: Coogee
Party	Candidate	Votes	%	±%
Labor	Michael Cleary	13,092	45.5	+3.1
Liberal	Ross Freeman	12,958	45.1	−1.5
Australia	Ann Sutherland	1,917	6.7	+6.7
Democratic Labor	Betty Stepkovitch	779	2.7	−1.8
Total formal votes		28,746	97.1	
Informal votes		869	2.9	
Turnout		29,615	88.4	
Two-party-preferred result
Liberal	Ross Freeman	14,377	50.01	−2.9
Labor	Michael Cleary	14,369	49.99	+2.9
Liberal hold		Swing	−2.9	

- This result was annulled by the Court of Disputed Returns and a by-election was held.

==== 1971 ====
1971 New South Wales state election: Coogee
Party	Candidate	Votes	%	±%
Liberal	Kevin Ellis	12,231	46.6	−4.0
Labor	Mary Barry	11,109	42.4	+0.5
Democratic Labor	Betty Stepkovitch	1,187	4.5	−0.7
Defence of Government Schools	Jean McCoroskin	967	3.7	+3.7
Independent	William Ash	725	2.8	+2.8
Total formal votes		26,219	97.4	
Informal votes		707	2.6	
Turnout		26,926	90.9	
Two-party-preferred result
Liberal	Kevin Ellis	13,860	52.9	−3.0
Labor	Mary Barry	12,359	47.1	+3.0
Liberal hold		Swing	−3.0	

=== Elections in the 1960s ===
==== 1968 ====
1968 New South Wales state election: Coogee
Party	Candidate	Votes	%	±%
Liberal	Kevin Ellis	11,924	50.6	+2.6
Labor	Lou Walsh	9,873	41.9	−5.7
Democratic Labor	John Cunningham	1,225	5.2	+0.8
Independent	Lincoln Oppenheimer	525	2.2	+2.2
Total formal votes		23,547	97.2	
Informal votes		687	2.8	
Turnout		24,234	92.7	
Two-party-preferred result
Liberal	Kevin Ellis	13,167	55.9	+4.2
Labor	Lou Walsh	10,380	44.1	−4.2
Liberal hold		Swing	+4.2	

==== 1965 ====
1965 New South Wales state election: Coogee
Party	Candidate	Votes	%	±%
Liberal	Kevin Ellis	10,626	48.0	+2.4
Labor	Lou Walsh	10,547	47.6	−2.1
Democratic Labor	Philip Cohen	972	4.4	−0.3
Total formal votes		22,145	98.3	−0.4
Informal votes		389	1.7	+0.4
Turnout		22,534	91.9	+0.2
Two-party-preferred result
Liberal	Kevin Ellis	11,443	51.7	+2.7
Labor	Lou Walsh	10,702	48.3	−2.7
Liberal gain from Labor		Swing	+2.7	

==== 1962 ====
1962 New South Wales state election: Coogee
Party	Candidate	Votes	%	±%
Labor	Lou Walsh	11,323	49.7	+3.4
Liberal	Kevin Ellis	10,392	45.6	−3.7
Democratic Labor	Peter Daly	1,061	4.7	+0.3
Total formal votes		22,776	98.7	
Informal votes		296	1.3	
Turnout		23,072	91.7	
Two-party-preferred result
Labor	Lou Walsh	11,615	51.0	+3.7
Liberal	Kevin Ellis	11,161	49.0	−3.7
Labor gain from Liberal		Swing	+3.7	

=== Elections in the 1950s ===
==== 1959 ====
1959 New South Wales state election: Coogee
Party	Candidate	Votes	%	±%
Liberal	Kevin Ellis	10,309	49.3	
Labor	Lou Walsh	9,690	46.3	
Democratic Labor	Allan Carter	930	4.4	
Total formal votes		20,929	98.3	
Informal votes		364	1.7	
Turnout		21,293	92.9	
Two-party-preferred result
Liberal	Kevin Ellis	11,027	52.7	
Labor	Lou Walsh	9,902	47.3	
Liberal hold		Swing		

==== 1956 ====
1956 New South Wales state election: Coogee
Party	Candidate	Votes	%	±%
Liberal	Kevin Ellis	10,072	51.1	+4.3
Labor	Lou Walsh	9,250	47.0	−6.2
Independent	Tasman Crocker	375	1.9	+1.9
Total formal votes		19,697	98.3	+0.1
Informal votes		334	1.7	−0.1
Turnout		20,031	92.6	−0.6
Two-party-preferred result
Liberal	Kevin Ellis	10,260	52.1	+5.3
Labor	Lou Walsh	9,437	47.9	−5.3
Liberal gain from Labor		Swing	+5.3	

==== 1953 ====
1953 New South Wales state election: Coogee
Party	Candidate	Votes	%	±%
Labor	Lou Walsh	11,099	53.2	
Liberal	Kevin Ellis	9,776	46.8	
Total formal votes		20,875	98.2	
Informal votes		386	1.8	
Turnout		21,261	93.2	
Labor gain from Liberal		Swing		

==== 1950 ====
1950 New South Wales state election: Coogee
Party	Candidate	Votes	%	±%
Liberal	Kevin Ellis	11,839	54.3	
Labor	Lou Walsh	9,948	45.7	
Total formal votes		21,787	98.3	
Informal votes		385	1.7	
Turnout		22,172	91.7	
Liberal gain from Labor		Swing		

The sitting member, Lou Cunningham (Labor), died in 1948. The 1948 by-election was won by Kevin Ellis (Liberal).

=== Elections in the 1940s ===
==== 1948 by-election ====
1948 Coogee by-election Saturday 8 May
Party	Candidate	Votes	%	±%
Liberal	Kevin Ellis	11,047	50.65	+2.35
Labor	Catherine Cunningham	9,896	45.37	−6.33
Communist	Wilton Brown	717	3.29	
Independent	Clare Peters	152	0.70	
Total formal votes		21,812	97.37	
Informal votes		589	2.63	
Turnout		22,401	87.52	
Liberal gain from Labor		Swing	+2.35	

Lou Cunningham (Labor) died.

==== 1947 ====
1947 New South Wales state election: Coogee
Party	Candidate	Votes	%	±%
Labor	Lou Cunningham	11,984	51.7	−9.0
Liberal	Kevin Ellis	11,191	48.3	+9.0
Total formal votes		23,175	98.1	+1.5
Informal votes		455	1.9	−1.5
Turnout		23,630	92.8	+2.6
Labor hold		Swing	−9.0	

==== 1944 ====
1944 New South Wales state election: Coogee
Party	Candidate	Votes	%	±%
Labor	Lou Cunningham	12,616	60.7	+4.7
Democratic	John Rubie	8,179	39.3	−4.7
Total formal votes		20,795	96.6	−1.7
Informal votes		726	3.4	+1.7
Turnout		21,521	90.2	−1.2
Labor hold		Swing	+4.7	

==== 1941 ====
1941 New South Wales state election: Coogee
Party	Candidate	Votes	%	±%
Labor	Lou Cunningham	11,341	56.0	
United Australia	Thomas Mutch	8,922	44.0	
Total formal votes		20,263	98.3	
Informal votes		357	1.7	
Turnout		20,620	91.4	
Labor gain from United Australia		Swing		

=== Elections in the 1930s ===
==== 1938 by-election ====
1938 Coogee by-election Saturday 25 June
Party	Candidate	Votes	%	±%
Labor	Robert Keating	6,752	32.51	
United Australia	Thomas Mutch	5,397	26.03	
United Australia	John Burrows	2,964	14.30	
United Australia	Hubert O'Connell	1,867	9.01	
United Australia	George Walters	1,594	7.69	
United Australia	Clifford Collins	1,100	5.31	
Independent	Mark Foots	1,056	5.09	
Total formal votes		20,730	95.00	
Informal votes		1,092	5.00	
Turnout		21,822	90.14	
Two-party-preferred result
United Australia	Thomas Mutch	12,034	58.05	
Labor	Robert Keating	8,696	41.95	
United Australia hold		Swing		

==== 1938 ====
This section is an excerpt from 1938 New South Wales state election § Coogee

1938 New South Wales state election: Coogee
Party	Candidate	Votes	%	±%
United Australia	John Dunningham	16,039	71.3	+4.2
Independent	Mark Foots	6,470	28.7	+28.7
Total formal votes		22,509	96.5	−1.5
Informal votes		812	3.5	+1.5
Turnout		23,321	94.2	−0.7
United Australia hold		Swing	N/A	

==== 1935 ====
This section is an excerpt from 1935 New South Wales state election § Coogee

1935 New South Wales state election: Coogee
Party	Candidate	Votes	%	±%
United Australia	John Dunningham	13,629	67.1	−0.1
Labor (NSW)	Karl Guhl	6,681	32.9	+3.0
Total formal votes		20,310	98.0	0.0
Informal votes		416	2.0	0.0
Turnout		20,726	94.9	−0.3
United Australia hold		Swing	N/A	

==== 1932 ====
This section is an excerpt from 1932 New South Wales state election § Coogee

1932 New South Wales state election: Coogee
Party	Candidate	Votes	%	±%
United Australia	John Dunningham	13,070	67.2	+13.8
Labor (NSW)	Alphonsus Ticehurst	5,811	29.9	−15.7
Independent	Mark Cochrane	406	2.1	+2.1
Communist	Jessa Burns	175	0.9	+0.9
Total formal votes		19,462	98.0	+0.9
Informal votes		394	2.0	−0.9
Turnout		19,856	95.2	+1.1
United Australia hold		Swing	N/A	

==== 1930 ====
This section is an excerpt from 1930 New South Wales state election § Coogee

1930 New South Wales state election: Coogee
Party	Candidate	Votes	%	±%
Nationalist	John Dunningham	9,881	53.4	
Labor	Mark Cochrane	8,429	45.6	
Independent	Rupert Treatt	95	0.5	
Independent	Walter Miller	86	0.5	
Total formal votes		18,491	97.1	
Informal votes		553	2.9	
Turnout		19,044	94.1	
Nationalist hold		Swing		

=== Elections in the 1920s ===
==== 1928 by-election ====
1928 Coogee by-election Saturday 22 September
Party	Candidate	Votes	%	±%
Nationalist	John Dunningham	7,854	69.23	
Labor	Morris Curotta	3,490	30.77	
Total formal votes		11,344	99.45	
Informal votes		63	0.55	
Turnout		11,407	61.92	
Nationalist hold		Swing		

==== 1927 ====
This section is an excerpt from 1927 New South Wales state election § Coogee

1927 New South Wales state election: Coogee
Party	Candidate	Votes	%	±%
Nationalist	Hyman Goldstein	9,196	67.6	
Labor	Thomas Brown	4,416	32.4	
Total formal votes		13,612	99.1	
Informal votes		123	0.9	
Turnout		13,735	78.5	
Nationalist win		(new seat)		
