= Members of the New South Wales Legislative Assembly, 1973–1976 =

Members of the New South Wales Legislative Assembly who served in the 44th parliament held their seats from 1973 to 1976. They were elected at the 1973 state election, and at by-elections. The Speaker was Jim Cameron.

Name	Party	Electorate	Term in office
David Arblaster	Liberal	Mosman	1972–1984
Sir Robert Askin (Note: Pittwater Liberal MLA and Premier Robert Askin resigned on 3 January 1975. Liberal candidate Bruce Webster won the resulting by-election on 8 February.)	Liberal	Pittwater	1950–1975
Brian Bannon	Labor	Rockdale	1959–1986
Gordon Barnier	Labor	Blacktown	1971–1981
John Barraclough	Liberal	Bligh	1968–1981
Eric Bedford	Labor	Fairfield	1968–1985
Ken Booth	Labor	Wallsend	1960–1988
Jack Boyd	National Country	Byron	1973–1984
Laurie Brereton	Labor	Heffron	1970–1971, 1973–1990
Ron Brewer (Note: Goulburn NCP MLA Ron Brewer resigned on 14 April 1974 to contest the federal seat of Eden-Monaro at the 1974 federal election. He lost the federal contest, and contested and won the by-election for his state seat on 20 July.)	National Country	Goulburn	1965–1984
Malcolm Brooks	Liberal	Gosford	1973–1976
Jim Brown	National Country	Raleigh	1959–1984
Tim Bruxner	National Country	Tenterfield	1962–1981
Tom Cahill	Labor	Marrickville	1959–1983
Jim Cameron	Liberal	Northcott	1968–1984
Michael Cleary (Note: The election of Coogee Liberal MLA Ross Freeman was voided by the Court of Disputed Returns on 23 May 1974. Labor candidate Michael Cleary won the resulting by-election on 20 July.)	Labor	Coogee	1974–1991
Jim Clough	Liberal	Eastwood	1956–1988
Harold Coates	Independent	Blue Mountains	1965–1976
Peter Coleman	Liberal	Fuller	1968–1978
Bruce Cowan	National Country	Oxley	1965–1980
Peter Cox	Labor	Auburn	1965–1988
Bill Crabtree	Labor	Kogarah	1953–1983
Geoff Crawford	National Country	Barwon	1950–1976
Sir Charles Cutler (Note: Orange NCP MLA Charles Cutler resigned on 16 December 1975. NCP candidate Garry West won the resulting by-election on 14 February 1976.)	National Country	Orange	1947–1975
Douglas Darby	Liberal	Manly	1945–1978
Don Day	Labor	Casino	1971–1984
Roger Degen	Labor	Balmain	1968–1984
John Dowd (Note: Lane Cove Liberal MLA Ken McCaw resigned on 3 January 1975. Liberal candidate John Dowd won the resulting by-election on 8 February.)	Liberal	Lane Cove	1975–1991
Keith Doyle	Liberal	Vaucluse	1965–1978
Bruce Duncan	National Country	Lismore	1965–1988
Vince Durick	Labor	Lakemba	1964–1984
Syd Einfeld	Labor	Waverley	1965–1981
Richard Face	Labor	Charlestown	1972–2003
Jack Ferguson	Labor	Merrylands	1959–1984
Wal Fife (Note: Wagga Wagga Liberal MLA Wal Fife resigned on 15 October 1975 in order to contest the seat of Farrer at the 1975 federal election. Liberal candidate Joe Schipp won the resulting by-election on 6 December.)	Liberal	Wagga Wagga	1957–1975
Tim Fischer	National Country	Sturt	1971–1980, 1980–1984
Col Fisher	National Country	Upper Hunter	1970–1988
Pat Flaherty	Labor	Granville	1962–1984
Ross Freeman	Liberal	Coogee	1973–1974
George Freudenstein	National Country	Young	1959–1981
Lin Gordon	Labor	Murrumbidgee	1970–1984
Ian Griffith	Liberal	Cronulla	1956–1978
Bill Haigh	Labor	Maroubra	1968–1983
Kevin Harrold	Democratic Labor	Gordon	1973–1976
John Hatton	Independent	South Coast	1973–1995
Dick Healey	Liberal	Davidson	1962–1981
Pat Hills	Labor	Phillip	1954–1988
David Hunter	Liberal	Ashfield	1940–1976
Merv Hunter	Labor	Lake Macquarie	1969–1991
John Jackett	Liberal	Burwood	1965–1978
Rex Jackson	Labor	Heathcote	1955–1986
Harry Jensen	Labor	Munmorah	1965–1981
Tony Johnson	Labor	Mount Druitt	1973–1983
Lew Johnstone	Labor	Broken Hill	1965–1981
Sam Jones	Labor	Waratah	1965–1984
Maurie Keane	Labor	Woronora	1973–1988
Nick Kearns	Labor	Bankstown	1962–1980
Laurie Kelly	Labor	Corrimal	1968–1988
David Leitch	National Country	Armidale	1973–1978
Tom Lewis	Liberal	Wollondilly	1957–1978
Gordon Mackie	Liberal	Albury	1965–1978
Michael Maher	Labor	Drummoyne	1973–1982
Dan Mahoney	Labor	Parramatta	1959–1976
John Maddison	Liberal	Ku-ring-gai	1962–1980
Cliff Mallam	Labor	Campbelltown	1953–1968, 1971–1981
John Mason	Liberal	Dubbo	1965–1981
Steve Mauger (Note: Monaro Liberal MLA Steve Mauger resigned on 27 January 1976. A by-election was initially called, but this was subsequently cancelled in favour of an early general election.)	Liberal	Monaro	1965–1976
Sir Ken McCaw	Liberal	Lane Cove	1947–1975
Laurie McGinty	Liberal	Willoughby	1968–1978
Tom Mead	Liberal	Hurstville	1965–1976
Mary Meillon	Liberal	Murray	1973–1980
Milton Morris	Liberal	Maitland	1956–1980
Ron Mulock	Labor	Penrith	1971–1988
Lerryn Mutton	Liberal	Yaralla	1968–1978
George Neilly	Labor	Cessnock	1959–1978
Keith O'Connell	Labor	Peats	1971–1984
Clive Osborne	National Country	Bathurst	1967–1981
George Paciullo	Labor	Liverpool	1971–1989
Noel Park	National Country	Tamworth	1973–1991
George Petersen	Labor	Illawarra	1968–1988
Neil Pickard	Liberal	Hornsby	1973–1991
Leon Punch	National Country	Gloucester	1959–1985
Ernie Quinn	Labor	Wentworthville	1962–1988
Eric Ramsay	Labor	Wollongong	1971–1984
Jack Renshaw	Labor	Castlereagh	1941–1980
Ron Rofe	Liberal	Nepean	1973–1978
Pat Rogan	Labor	East Hills	1973–1999
Kevin Rozzoli	Liberal	Hawkesbury	1973–2003
Max Ruddock	Liberal	The Hills	1962–1976
Joe Schipp	Liberal	Wagga Wagga	1975–1999
Terry Sheahan	Labor	Burrinjuck	1973–1988
Matt Singleton	National Country	Clarence	1971–1990
Kevin Stewart	Labor	Canterbury	1962–1985
Jim Taylor	National Country	Temora	1960–1981
Allan Viney	Liberal	Wakehurst	1971–1978
Arthur Wade	Labor	Newcastle	1968–1988
John Waddy	Liberal	Kirribilli	1962–1976
Frank Walker	Labor	Georges River	1970–1988
Tim Walker	Liberal	Miranda	1968–1978
Bruce Webster	Liberal	Pittwater	1975–1978
Garry West	National Country	Orange	1976–1996
Sir Eric Willis	Liberal	Earlwood	1950–1978
Roger Wotton	National Country	Burrendong	1968–1971, 1973–1991
Neville Wran	Labor	Bass Hill	1973–1986

== See also ==
- Sixth Askin ministry
- First Lewis ministry
- Second Lewis ministry
- Willis ministry
- Results of the 1973 New South Wales state election (Legislative Assembly)
- Candidates of the 1973 New South Wales state election
