= 1938 Coogee state by-election =

Election result for Coogee, New South Wales, Australia

A by-election was held for the New South Wales Legislative Assembly electorate of Coogee on 25 June 1938 because of the death of United Australia Party member John Dunningham.

== Dates ==
Date	Event
26 May 1938	John Dunningham died.
3 June 1938	Writ of election issued by the Speaker of the Legislative Assembly and close of electoral rolls.
10 June 1938	Nominations
25 June 1938	Polling day
9 July 1938	Return of writ

== Results ==
1938 Coogee by-election Saturday 25 June
Party	Candidate	Votes	%	±%
Labor	Robert Keating	6,752	32.51	
United Australia	Thomas Mutch	5,397	26.03	
United Australia	John Burrows	2,964	14.30	
United Australia	Hubert O'Connell	1,867	9.01	
United Australia	George Walters	1,594	7.69	
United Australia	Clifford Collins	1,100	5.31	
Independent	Mark Foots	1,056	5.09	
Total formal votes		20,730	95.00	
Informal votes		1,092	5.00	
Turnout		21,822	90.14	
Two-party-preferred result
United Australia	Thomas Mutch	12,034	58.05	
Labor	Robert Keating	8,696	41.95	
United Australia hold		Swing		

== See also ==
- Electoral results for the district of Coogee
- List of New South Wales state by-elections
