= 1948 Coogee state by-election =

Election result for Coogee, New South Wales, Australia

A by-election was held for the New South Wales Legislative Assembly electorate of Coogee on 8 May 1948 because of the death of Lou Cunningham (Labor). The Labor candidate was his widow Catherine.

== Dates ==
Date	Event
23 March 1948	Lou Cunningham died.
12 April 1948	Writ of election issued by the Speaker of the Legislative Assembly.
20 April 1948	Nominations
8 May 1948	Polling day
4 June 1948	Return of writ

== Results ==
1948 Coogee by-election Saturday 8 May
Party	Candidate	Votes	%	±%
Liberal	Kevin Ellis	11,047	50.65	+2.35
Labor	Catherine Cunningham	9,896	45.37	−6.33
Communist	Wilton Brown	717	3.29	
Independent	Clare Peters	152	0.70	
Total formal votes		21,812	97.37	
Informal votes		589	2.63	
Turnout		22,401	87.52	
Liberal gain from Labor		Swing	+2.35	

== See also ==
- Electoral results for the district of Coogee
- List of New South Wales state by-elections
