= 1974 Coogee state by-election =

Election result for Coogee, New South Wales, Australia

A by-election was held for the New South Wales Legislative Assembly electorate of Coogee on 20 July 1974 because the Court of Disputed Returns overturned the result of the 1973 Coogee election. Ross Freeman (Liberal) had been declared elected by 8 votes over Michael Cleary (Labor). Justice Slattery in the Court of Disputed Returns held that 25 electors had been improperly deprived of a vote and declared that the election was void.

== Dates ==
| Date | Event |
|---|---|
| 17 November 1973 | New South Wales State election |
| 24 December 1973 | Michael Cleary filed a petition against the election in the Court of Disputed returns. |
| 23 May 1974 | Court of Disputed Returns declared the 1973 election for Coogee was void. |
| 21 June 1974 | Writ of election issued by the Speaker of the Legislative Assembly and close of electoral rolls. |
| 27 June 1974 | Nominations |
| 20 July 1974 | Polling day |
| 2 August 1974 | Return of writ |

== Results ==
1974 Coogee by-election Saturday 20 July
| Party | Candidate | Votes | % | ±% |
|---|---|---|---|---|
| Labor | Michael Cleary | 12,521 | 46.87 | +4.5 |
| Liberal | Ross Freeman | 12,823 | 48.00 | +1.4 |
| Australia | Ann Sutherland | 1,111 | 4.16 | |
| Independent | F C Keep | 161 | 0.60 | |
| Independent | Bernard Forshaw | 89 | 0.33 | |
| National Socialist | Ross May | 11 | 0.04 | |
| Total formal votes | | 29,716 | 97.82 | |
| Informal votes | | 596 | 2.18 | |
| Turnout | | 27,312 | 81.17 | |
Two-party-preferred result
| Labor | Michael Cleary | 13,385 | 50.10 | +3.0 |
| Liberal | Ross Freeman | 12,823 | 49.90 | −3.0 |
| Labor gain from Liberal | | | | |

== See also ==
- Electoral results for the district of Coogee
- List of New South Wales state by-elections
