= 1928 Coogee state by-election =

Election result for Coogee, New South Wales, Australia

A by-election was held for the New South Wales Legislative Assembly electorate of Coogee on 22 September 1928 because of the death of Hyman Goldstein (Nationalist).

== Dates ==
Date	Event
7 September 1928	Writ of election issued by the Speaker of the Legislative Assembly.
14 September 1928	Nominations
22 September 1928	Polling day
5 October 1928	Return of writ

== Results ==
1928 Coogee by-election Saturday 22 September
Party	Candidate	Votes	%	±%
Nationalist	John Dunningham	7,854	69.23	
Labor	Morris Curotta	3,490	30.77	
Total formal votes		11,344	99.45	
Informal votes		63	0.55	
Turnout		11,407	61.92	
Nationalist hold		Swing		

Hyman Goldstein (Nationalist) died.

== See also ==
- Electoral results for the district of Coogee
- List of New South Wales state by-elections
