= Lewis–Punch ministry =

The Lewis–Punch ministry or Second Lewis ministry was the 69th ministry of the New South Wales Government, and was led by the 33rd Premier, Tom Lewis, of the Liberal Party in coalition with the Country Party, led by Leon Punch. It was the first of two occasions when Lewis was Premier and the first of two occasions when Punch served as Deputy Premier.

== Background ==
Lewis was elected to the New South Wales Legislative Assembly in 1957 and served continuously until 1978, representing the seat of Wollondilly. When the Askin government came to power in 1965, Lewis was given relatively junior portfolios of Lands and Mines. In 1972, Tourism was added to his ministerial responsibilities when Eric Willis moved to Education. Late in 1974, Askin announced his resignation and Lewis was chosen as leader over Willis and Justice Minister John Maddison.

Punch was elected to the NSW Legislative Assembly in 1959 and served continuously until 1985, representing variously the seats of Upper Hunter (1959-1962) and then Gloucester (1962-1985. Elected Deputy Leader of the Country Party in 1973, Punch was elected as leader of his party following the retirement and resignation of Sir Charles Cutler in December 1975.

Lewis inherited a relatively stable government that had been in power for ten years. However, the Liberal government was engaged in almost daily warfare with the Whitlam Labor federal government, most notably over the Medibank health care scheme, to which New South Wales was the last state to sign.

== Composition of ministry ==
The composition of the ministry was announced by Premier Lewis and sworn in on 17 December 1975, and covers the period until 23 January 1976, when Lewis was deposed as Liberal leader by Sir Eric Willis following a spill motion on 20 January 1976, necessitating a reconfiguration of the ministry as the Willis–Punch ministry.

| Portfolio | Minister | Party | Term commence | Term end | Term of office |
|---|---|---|---|---|---|
| Premier; Treasurer | Tom Lewis (Note: Retained portfolios from the Lewis–Cutler ministry.) | Liberal | 17 December 1975 | 23 January 1976 | 37 days |
| Deputy Premier; Minister for Public Works; Minister for Ports | Leon Punch | Country | 17 December 1975 | 23 January 1976 | 37 days |
| Attorney General; Minister of Justice | John Maddison | Liberal | 17 December 1975 | 23 January 1976 | 37 days |
| Minister for Planning and Environment; Vice-president of the Executive Council; Leader of the Government in Legislative Council | John Fuller, MLC | Country | 17 December 1975 | 23 January 1976 | 37 days |
| Minister for Decentralisation and Development; Minister for Tourism | Tim Bruxner | Country | 17 December 1975 | 23 January 1976 | 37 days |
| Minister for Education | Sir Eric Willis | Liberal | 17 December 1975 | 23 January 1976 | 37 days |
| Minister for Labour and Industry; Minister for Consumer Affairs; Minister for Federal Affairs | Frederick Hewitt, MLC | Liberal | 17 December 1975 | 23 January 1976 | 37 days |
| Minister for Police; Minister for Services | John Waddy | Liberal | 17 December 1975 | 23 January 1976 | 37 days |
| Minister for Mines; Minister for Energy | George Freudenstein | Country | 17 December 1975 | 23 January 1976 | 37 days |
| Minister for Housing; Minister for Co-operative Societies | Laurence McGinty | Liberal | 17 December 1975 | 23 January 1976 | 37 days |
| Minister for Health | Dick Healey | Liberal | 17 December 1975 | 23 January 1976 | 37 days |
| Minister for Transport; Minister for Highways | Max Ruddock | Liberal | 17 December 1975 | 23 January 1976 | 37 days |
| Minister for Youth, Ethnic and Community Affairs | Steve Mauger | Liberal | 17 December 1975 | 23 January 1976 | 37 days |
| Minister for Culture, Sport and Recreation | John Barraclough | Liberal | 17 December 1975 | 23 January 1976 | 37 days |
| Minister for Agriculture; Minister for Water Resources | Bruce Cowan | Country | 17 December 1975 | 23 January 1976 | 37 days |
| Minister for Lands; Minister for Forests | John Mason | Liberal | 17 December 1975 | 23 January 1976 | 37 days |
| Minister for Local Government | Col Fisher | Country | 17 December 1975 | 23 January 1976 | 37 days |
| Minister for Revenue; Assistant Treasurer | Peter Coleman | Liberal | 17 December 1975 | 23 January 1976 | 37 days |

Ministers are members of the Legislative Assembly unless otherwise noted.

== See also ==
- Members of the New South Wales Legislative Assembly, 1973–1976
- Members of the New South Wales Legislative Council, 1973–1976

== Notes ==
| Preceded by Lewis–Cutler ministry | Lewis–Punch ministry 1975–1976 | Succeeded by Willis–Punch ministry |
