= Minister for Federal Affairs (New South Wales) =

Former government minister in New South Wales, Australia

- Style: The Honourable
- Nominator: Premier of New South Wales
- Appointer: Governor of New South Wales
- Inaugural holder: Frederick Hewitt
- Formation: 3 January 1975

The Minister for Federal Affairs was a short lived minister of the New South Wales Government and has responsibilities for matters relating to small business policy and regulation in New South Wales. The only minister was Frederick Hewitt, MLC in the first and second Lewis ministries and Willis ministry, who was responsible for inter-governmental relations between the State and Federal governments.

The Premier's Department was responsible for relationships with the federal government, and in early 1975 the Division of Federal Affairs was established within the Premier's Department, as a result of the review of the machinery of government and economy of government operations in New South Wales. Although the Division of Federal Affairs was situated within the Premier's Department for administrative convenience, it served the new Minister for Federal Affairs. The appointment of the Minister for Federal Affairs was the first time a government in Australia created a portfolio with specific responsibility for inter-governmental relations. The Division's establishment reflected the growing concerns amongst political leaders in New South Wales over the political considerations for inter-governmental dealings and with the increasing difficulties in the implementation of joint Commonwealth-State programmes due to the complex network of departments and statutory bodies, sometimes extending over three levels of government.

== List of ministers ==
Title	Minister	Party	Ministry	Term start	Term end	Time in office	Notes
Minister for Federal Affairs	Frederick Hewitt	Liberal	Lewis (1) (2); Willis	3 January 1975	23 January 1976	1 year, 20 days	

== See also ==
- List of New South Wales government agencies
