= Willis–Punch ministry =

70th New South Wales government, led by Sir Eric Willis

- 70th Cabinet of the State of New South Wales

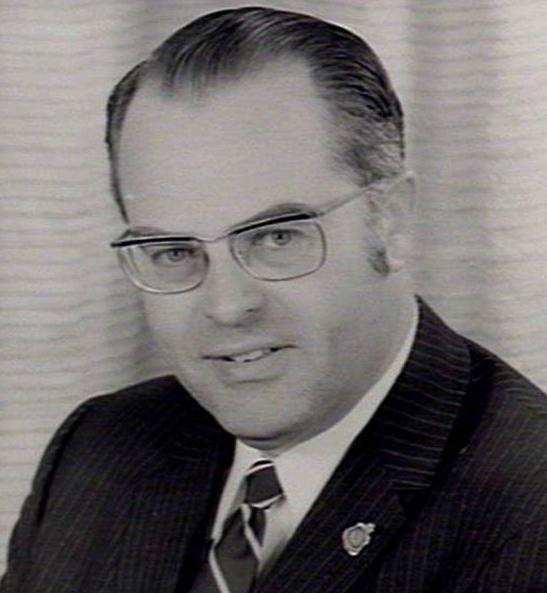
- Premier Sir Eric Willis
- Date formed: 23 January 1976
- Date dissolved: 14 May 1976

People and organisations
- Monarch: Queen Elizabeth II
- Governor: Sir Roden Cutler
- Premier: Sir Eric Willis
- Deputy Premier: Leon Punch
- No. of ministers: 18
- Member parties: Liberal National coalition
- Opposition party: Labor
- Opposition leader: Neville Wran

History
- Election: 1973 New South Wales election
- Predecessor: Lewis–Punch ministry
- Successor: First Wran ministry

The Willis–Punch ministry or Willis ministry was the 70th ministry of the New South Wales Government, and was led by the 34th Premier of New South Wales, Sir Eric Willis in a Liberal Party coalition with the Country Party of Australia, that was led by Leon Punch.

== Background ==
Willis joined the newly formed Liberal Party of Australia in 1945, after hearing a speech by Sir Robert Menzies. After unsuccessfully seeking election to the Australian House of Representatives, Willis was elected to the New South Wales Legislative Assembly in 1950 and served continuously up until 1978, representing the seat of Earlwood, in the inner southwestern suburbs of Sydney. Upon Sir Robert Askin's retirement in January 1975, Willis was seen as the favourite to take the premiership. However, despite Askin's initial support, Willis refused his help, preferring to gain the leadership on his own merits. Askin then put his support behind the Minister for Lands, Tom Lewis. Willis, sure he had support, refused to campaign, and the party put its support behind Lewis, leading to his election to Premier. Willis was then replaced as Deputy by John Maddison. For Willis' service as Deputy Leader he was appointed a Knight Commander of the Order of the British Empire on 14 June 1975. Lewis was Premier for only one year and looked increasingly likely to lead the state Liberals to defeat. At the party room meeting on 20 January 1976, parliamentary backbencher Neil Pickard called a spill motion. This was carried 22 votes to 11 and Willis was made Leader unopposed.

Punch was elected to the NSW Legislative Assembly in 1959 and served continuously up until 1985, representing variously the seats of Upper Hunter (1959-1962) and then Gloucester (1962-1985). Elected Deputy Leader of the Country Party in 1973, Punch was elected as leader of his party following the retirement and resignation of the Sir Charles Cutler in December 1975.

== Composition of ministry ==
The ministry was sworn in by the Lieutenant Governor Sir Laurence Street on 23 January 1976, a few days after Willis deposed Tom Lewis in a spill motion for the leadership of the parliamentary branch of the Liberal Party in New South Wales. It ended on 14 May 1976 when the coalition was defeated at the 1976 election by the Labor Party and the First Wran ministry was sworn in.

Portfolio	Minister	Party	Term commence	Term end	Term of office
Premier; Treasurer	Sir Eric Willis	Liberal	23 January 1976	14 May 1976	112 days
Deputy Premier; Minister for Public Works; Minister for Ports	Leon Punch (Note: Retained portfolios from the Lewis–Punch ministry.)	Country	23 January 1976	14 May 1976	112 days
Attorney General; Minister for Justice	John Maddison	Liberal	23 January 1976	14 May 1976	112 days
Minister for Planning and Environment; Vice-President of the Executive Council; Leader of the Government in Legislative Council	John Fuller, MLC	Country	23 January 1976	14 May 1976	112 days
Minister for Transport; Minister for Highways	Tim Bruxner	Country	23 January 1976	14 May 1976	112 days
Minister for Labour and Industry; Minister for Federal Affairs; Minister for Consumer Affairs	Frederick Hewitt, MLC	Liberal	23 January 1976	14 May 1976	112 days
Minister for Health	Dick Healey	Liberal	23 January 1976	14 May 1976	112 days
Minister for Local Government	Tom Lewis	Liberal	23 January 1976	14 May 1976	112 days
Minister for Decentralisation and Development	Milton Morris	Liberal	23 January 1976	14 May 1976	112 days
Minister for Mines; Minister for Energy	George Freudenstein	Country	23 January 1976	14 May 1976	112 days
Chief Secretary	Peter Coleman	Liberal	23 January 1976	14 May 1976	112 days
Minister for Education	Neil Pickard	Liberal	23 January 1976	14 May 1976	112 days
Minister for Agriculture; Minister for Water Resources	Bruce Cowan	Country	23 January 1976	14 May 1976	112 days
Assistant Treasurer; Minister for Revenue	Max Ruddock	Liberal	23 January 1976	14 May 1976	112 days
Minister for Housing; Minister for Co-operative Societies	Ian Griffith	Liberal	23 January 1976	14 May 1976	112 days
Minister for Lands; Minister for Forests	Col Fisher	Country	23 January 1976	14 May 1976	112 days
Minister for Youth, Ethnic and Community Affairs	Jim Clough	Liberal	23 January 1976	14 May 1976	112 days
Minister for Culture, Sport and Recreation; Minister for Tourism	David Arblaster	Liberal	23 January 1976	14 May 1976	112 days

Ministers are members of the Legislative Assembly unless otherwise noted.

== See also ==
- Members of the New South Wales Legislative Assembly, 1973–1976
- Members of the New South Wales Legislative Council, 1973–1976

== Notes ==
Preceded by Lewis–Punch ministry	Willis ministry 1976	Succeeded by First Wran ministry
