= Lewis–Cutler ministry =

The Lewis–Cutler ministry or First Lewis ministry was the 68th ministry of the New South Wales Government, and was led by the 33rd Premier, Tom Lewis, of the Liberal Party in coalition with the Country Party, led by Sir Charles Cutler. It was the first of two occasions when Lewis was Premier; and the seventh and final occasion when Cutler served as Deputy Premier.

== Background ==
Lewis was elected to the New South Wales Legislative Assembly in 1957 and served continuously until 1978, representing the seat of Wollondilly. When the Askin government came to power in 1965, Lewis was given relatively junior portfolios of Lands and Mines. In 1972, Tourism was added to his ministerial responsibilities when Eric Willis moved to Education. Late in 1974, Askin announced his resignation and Lewis was chosen as leader over Willis and Justice Minister John Maddison.

Cutler was elected to the NSW Legislative Assembly in 1947 and served continuously until 1975, representing the seat of Orange. Elected Deputy Leader of the Country Party in 1958, Cutler was elected as leader of his party following the 1959 state election, replacing Davis Hughes.

Lewis inherited a relatively stable government that had been in power for ten years. However, the Liberal government was engaged in almost daily warfare with the Whitlam Labor federal government, most notably over the Medibank health care scheme, to which New South Wales was the last state to sign.

== Composition of ministry ==
The composition of the ministry was announced by Premier Lewis and sworn in on 3 January 1975, and covers the period from 3 January 1975, when the former Premier, Sir Robert Askin resigned as Premier and as Member for Pittwater, until 17 December 1975, the day after Cutler resigned as Deputy Premier, the Leader of the Country Party, and as Member for Orange. There were minor rearrangements in June 1975 following the resignation of Milton Morris and in October 1975 when Wal Fife resigned in order to successfully contest the Australian House of Representatives seat of Farrer at the 1975 federal election.

| Portfolio | Minister | Party | Term commence | Term end | Term of office |
|---|---|---|---|---|---|
| Premier; Treasurer | Tom Lewis | Liberal | 3 January 1975 | 17 December 1975 | 348 days |
| Deputy Premier; Minister for Local Government; Minister for Tourism | Sir Charles Cutler (Note: Retained portfolios from the sixth Askin–Cutler ministry.) | Country | 3 January 1975 | 16 December 1975 | 347 days |
| Attorney General; Minister of Justice | John Maddison | Liberal | 3 January 1975 | 17 December 1975 | 348 days |
| Minister for Planning and Environment; Vice-president of the Executive Council; Leader of the Government in Legislative Council | John Fuller, MLC | Country | 3 January 1975 | 17 December 1975 | 348 days |
| Minister for Public Works; Minister for Ports | Leon Punch | Country | 3 January 1975 | 17 December 1975 | 348 days |
| Minister for Education | Eric Willis | Liberal | 3 January 1975 | 17 December 1975 | 348 days |
| Minister for Labour and Industry; Minister for Consumer Affairs; Minister for Federal Affairs | Frederick Hewitt, MLC | Liberal | 3 January 1975 | 17 December 1975 | 348 days |
| Minister for Lands; Minister for Forests | Milton Morris (Note: Milton Morris resigned on 30 June 1975 and John Mason was appointed to replace him.) | Liberal | 3 January 1975 | 30 June 1975 | 178 days |
| Minister for Lands; Minister for Forests | John Mason | Liberal | 30 June 1975 | 17 December 1975 | 170 days |
| Minister for Agriculture | Geoff Crawford | Country | 3 January 1975 | 16 December 1975 | 347 days |
| Minister for Transport; Minister for Highways | Wal Fife (Note: Wal Fife resigned on 10 October 1975. His ministerial responsibilities were transferred to Max Ruddock and Peter Coleman was promoted to the ministry, taking on the portfolio responsibilities previously held by Ruddock.) | Liberal | 3 January 1975 | 10 October 1975 | 280 days |
| Minister for Transport; Minister for Highways | Max Ruddock | Liberal | 10 October 1975 | 17 December 1975 | 68 days |
| Minister for Police; Minister for Services | John Waddy | Liberal | 3 January 1975 | 17 December 1975 | 348 days |
| Minister for Mines; Minister for Energy | George Freudenstein | Country | 3 January 1975 | 17 December 1975 | 348 days |
| Minister for Decentralisation and Development | Tim Bruxner | Country | 3 January 1975 | 17 December 1975 | 348 days |
| Minister for Housing; Minister for Co-operative Societies | Laurence McGinty | Liberal | 3 January 1975 | 17 December 1975 | 348 days |
| Minister for Health | Dick Healey | Liberal | 3 January 1975 | 17 December 1975 | 348 days |
| Minister for Revenue; Assistant Treasurer | Max Ruddock | Liberal | 3 January 1975 | 10 October 1975 | 280 days |
| Minister for Revenue; Assistant Treasurer | Peter Coleman | Liberal | 10 October 1975 | 17 December 1975 | 68 days |
| Minister for Youth, Ethnic and Community Affairs | Steve Mauger | Liberal | 3 January 1975 | 17 December 1975 | 348 days |
| Minister for Culture, Sport and Recreation | John Barraclough | Liberal | 3 January 1975 | 17 December 1975 | 348 days |

Ministers are members of the Legislative Assembly unless otherwise noted.

== See also ==
- Members of the New South Wales Legislative Assembly, 1973–1976
- Members of the New South Wales Legislative Council, 1973–1976

== Notes ==
| Preceded by Sixth Askin–Cutler ministry (1973–1975) | Lewis–Cutler ministry 1975 | Succeeded by Lewis–Punch ministry (1975–1976) |
