= Marjorie O'Neill =

Australian politician

Dr Marjorie O'Neill MP
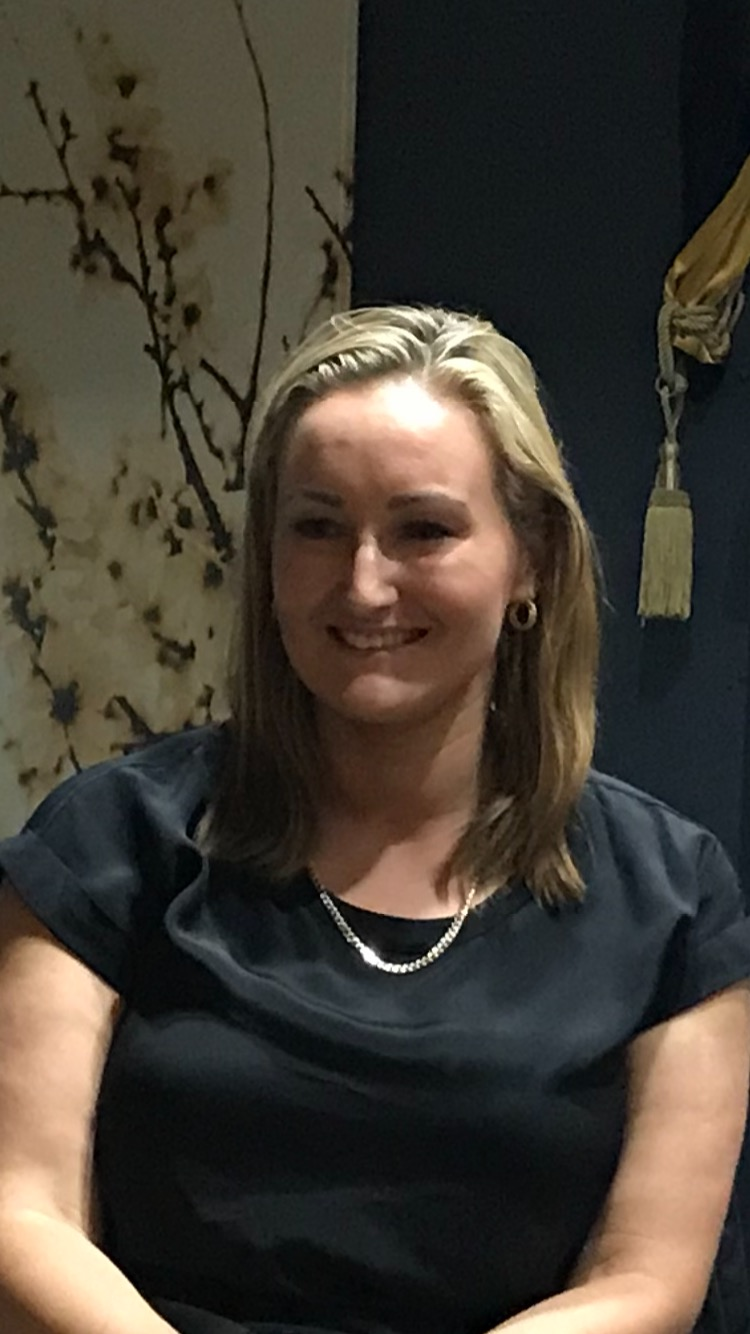
- O'Neill at a Bring Back Our Buses Rally in 2019

Member of the New South Wales Parliament for Coogee
- Incumbent
- Assumed office 23 March 2019
- Preceded by: Bruce Notley-Smith

Parliamentary Secretary for Transport
- Incumbent
- Assumed office 26 April 2023
- Minister: Jo Haylen (2023—2025); John Graham (2025—present)
- Preceded by: Mark Taylor

Councillor of Waverley Council for Waverley Ward
- In office 9 September 2017 – 16 March 2021

Personal details
- Born: Marjorie Spooner O'Neill; 6 December 1985 (age 40) Sydney, Australia
- Party: Australian Labor Party
- Education: St Vincent's College, Potts Point
- Occupation: Politician
- Website: marjorieoneill.com.au

Marjorie Spooner O'Neill is an Australian politician. O'Neill was elected as a Labor member of the New South Wales Legislative Assembly representing Coogee at the 2019 state election. O'Neill was also a Councillor of Waverley Council from 2017 to 2021.

== Background and early life ==
Born to Brian William O'Neill and Keri Spooner, O'Neill was raised in the Bronte area of Sydney. Marjorie attended St Vincent's College, Potts Point. Her father, Brian O'Neill, served as a member of the Industrial Relations Commission of New South Wales for over 20 years. She has a PhD in Management and Economics and has been an academic teaching in Australia and internationally.

O'Neill is a volunteer surf lifesaver at Clovelly Surf Life Saving Club. She also played rugby union for Sydney University Women's Rugby Club and coached at UNSW.

== Political career ==
O'Neill was first elected to Waverley Council on 9 September 2017 in Waverley Ward representing the Labor Party. She served as the Chair of the Community Safety Advisory Committee and the Waverley Surf Life Saving Club Committee. She was later preselected to run as the Labor candidate in the Division of Coogee in the 2019 state election. Dr. O'Neill defeated Bruce Notley-Smith to become the Member for Coogee, in one of two victories for the Labor Party in the 2019 state election.

O'Neill used her inaugural speech to discuss her heritage, her family, the history of the electorate of Coogee, and her priorities while she holds the seat. In her first term, she was a member of the Legislative Assembly Committee on Transport and Infrastructure and the Modern Slavery Committee. She was appointed as the Parliamentary Secretary for Transport in May 2023.

O'Neill is a regular contributor to The Beast magazine, with her own column each month.

== Publications ==
- O'Neill, M. S.; Johns, R. E. (2009). "How a welfare approach to maternity has facilitated low workforce participation rates for Australian women of child-bearing age". International Employment Relations Review. 15 (1): 53–72 – via University of Technology Sydney.
- O’Neill, M. S., & Jepsen, D. (2019). Women's desire for the kaleidoscope of authenticity, balance and challenge: A multi‐method study of female health workers’ careers. Gender, Work & Organization, 26(7), 962–982
- Spooner, K., & O’Neill, M. (2023). 170 years later can the northcote-Trevelyan report 1854 help address corruption in local government. International Journal of Employment Studies, 31(2), 67–87.
- Jepsen, D. M., & O'Neill, M. S. (2013). Australian hospital pharmacists reflect on career success. Journal of Pharmacy Practice and Research, 43(1), 29–31.
- O'Neill, M. (2014). The new late life career: a mixed methods study of health workers: understanding the workforce issues of today's older workers (Doctoral dissertation, Macquarie University).
- O'Neill, B., & O'Neill, M. (2010). Termination in Australia: the implications of changing the unfair dismissal and termination law. International Employment Relations Review, 16(1), 82–94.

New South Wales Legislative Assembly
Preceded by Bruce Notley-Smith	Member for Coogee; 2019–present	Incumbent
