= Ernie Page (politician) =

Australian politician (1935–2018)

The Honourable Ernie Page OAM

Minister for Local Government
- In office 4 April 1995 – 8 April 1999
- Premier: Bob Carr
- Preceded by: Ted Pickering
- Succeeded by: Harry Woods

Member of the New South Wales Parliament for Waverley
- In office 19 September 1981 – 3 May 1991
- Preceded by: Syd Einfeld
- Succeeded by: District abolished

Member of the New South Wales Parliament for Coogee
- In office 25 May 1991 – 28 February 2003
- Preceded by: Michael Cleary
- Succeeded by: Paul Pearce

Personal details
- Born: 18 February 1935 Parramatta, New South Wales, Australia
- Died: 20 May 2018 (aged 83)
- Spouses: Marianne Welsh (m. 1957–1994) Barbara Weston (m. 1994)
- Children: 3 daughters and 2 sons
- Profession: Engineer

Ernest Thomas (Ernie) Page OAM (18 February 1935 – 20 May 2018) was an Australian politician, who served nine terms as Mayor of Waverley and was a Labor Party member of the New South Wales Legislative Assembly from 1981 to 2003. Page was Minister for Local Government in the first government of Bob Carr from 1995 to 1999.

== Early life and career ==
Page was educated at St Joseph's College, Hunters Hill and the University of New South Wales, and served two years as a conscript in the army in 1954–55. He worked as an engineer in the electricity industry before entering state politics, and was an active member of both the Labor Party and the trade union movement. Page was a councillor for the Waverley Municipal Council from 1962 to 1987, nine of those years as mayor.

== Parliament of New South Wales ==
Page nominated for Labor preselection for the local seat of Waverley at the 1981 state election after the retirement of Wran government minister Syd Einfeld, and was successful. He easily defeated the Liberal candidate on election day, and was re-elected twice more, before switching to the seat of Coogee when Waverley was abolished in 1991. He served another three terms as the member for Coogee. Page also served as Minister for Local Government in the first Carr government from 1995 to 1999, but was not reappointed to the ministry after the 1999 state election. Page retired at the 2003 election.

== Later life ==
In the Queen's Birthday 2006 Honours List, Page was awarded the Medal of the Order of Australia for service to the New South Wales Parliament and to local government.

On 22 May 2018, the Deputy Speaker Thomas George informed the Legislative Assembly that Page had died on 20 May.

Civic offices
Preceded by Doug Morey	Mayor of Waverley; 1965–1967	Succeeded by Doug Sutherland
Preceded by Doug Morey	Mayor of Waverley; 1973–1974	Succeeded by James Markham
Preceded by David Taylor	Mayor of Waverley; 1978–1984	Succeeded by James Markham
New South Wales Legislative Assembly
Preceded by Syd Einfeld	Member for Waverley; 1981–1991	Seat abolished
Preceded by Michael Cleary	Member for Coogee; 1991–2003	Succeeded by Paul Pearce
Political offices
Preceded by Ted Pickering	Minister for Local Government; 1995–1999	Succeeded by Harry Woods
