= Kevin Ellis (politician) =

Australian politician (1908–1975)

The Honourable Sir Kevin Ellis KBE
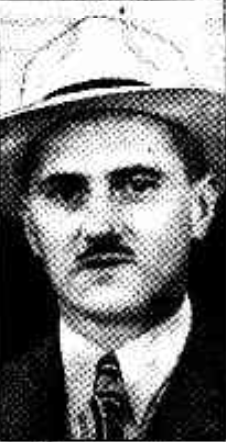
- Ellis circa 1950

23rd Speaker of the New South Wales Legislative Assembly
- In office 26 May 1965 – 3 December 1973
- Monarch: Elizabeth II
- Preceded by: Ray Maher
- Succeeded by: Jim Cameron

Personal details
- Born: Kevin William Collin Ellis; 15 May 1908 Grenfell, New South Wales, Australia
- Died: 22 November 1975 (aged 67) Point Piper, New South Wales, Australia
- Party: Liberal Party
- Spouse: Bettie Maunsell

Military service
- Allegiance: Australia
- Branch/service: Royal Australian Air Force
- Rank: Flight lieutenant
- Battles/wars: World War II

Sir Kevin William Collin Ellis KBE (15 May 1908 – 22 November 1975) was an Australian politician and solicitor, elected as a Liberal member of the New South Wales Legislative Assembly.

== Early life and education ==
Ellis was born in Grenfell, New South Wales to James Ellis, a farmer and migrant from England, and Florence Wyse. He was educated at Fort Street High School, graduated in law at the University of Sydney in 1931, and economics in 1939. He served as president of the University of Sydney Students' Representative Council in 1937 and 1938.

== Career ==
Ellis was a Liberal candidate for Coogee at ten elections, winning seven. After an initial defeat by Labor MLA Lou Cunningham at the 1947 election, Cunningham died the following year and Ellis won the by-election in 1948, defeating Cunningham's widow. The following seven elections over 18 years were contested by Ellis and Labor candidate Lou Walsh. Ellis retained the seat at the 1950 election, before losing it to Walsh in 1953. Ellis regained the seat in 1956, and retained it in 1959, before losing it to Walsh again in 1962. Ellis defeated Walsh in 1965 to regain the seat, defeating Walsh for a final time in 1968. Ellis retained the seat in 1971, before retiring in 1973. With the election of the Askin coalition government, Ellis was appointed Speaker of the Legislative Assembly, serving until 1973.

== Personal life ==
Ellis married Bettie Maunsell in July 1941 and they had one daughter and one son. He died in the Sydney suburb of Point Piper.

== Honours ==
Ellis was knighted in 1969 in recognition of service as the Speaker.

Sir Kevin Ellis Prize (for the best performance in the combined Bachelor of Commerce and Bachelor of Laws degree program) until 2008, Faculty of Law/Faculty of Commerce, UNSW.

New South Wales Legislative Assembly
Preceded by Lou Cunningham	Member for Coogee; 1948–1953	Succeeded by Lou Walsh
Preceded by Lou Walsh	Member for Coogee; 1956–1962	Succeeded by Lou Walsh
Preceded by Lou Walsh	Member for Coogee; 1965–1973	Succeeded by Ross Freeman
Preceded by Ray Maher	Speaker of the New South Wales Legislative Assembly; 1965–1973	Succeeded by Jim Cameron
