= Lou Walsh =

Australian politician (1899–1978)

Personal details
- Born: 29 March 1899 near Milton, New South Wales
- Died: 1 September 1978 (aged 79) at Randwick, New South Wales
- Party: Labor Party

Louis Andrew Walsh (29 March 1899 – 1 September 1978) was an Australian politician and a member of the New South Wales Legislative Assembly between 1953 and 1956 and again between 1962 and 1965. He was a member of the Labor Party.

== Early life ==
Walsh was born at Yatteyattah near Milton, New South Wales and was the son of a dairy farmer. He was educated at Sydney Teachers College and the University of Sydney, graduating with a Bachelor of Economics degree in 1923. Walsh was employed as a high school teacher by the New South Wales Department of Education and became an official in the New South Wales Teachers Federation. He was elected an alderman of Randwick City Council between 1950 and 1953 and between 1959 and 1962 and was mayor in 1952. In the period he was absent from parliament between 1956 and 1962, Walsh was a teacher at Sydney Technical High School and Randwick Boys High School

== State Parliament ==
Walsh was the endorsed Labor candidate for the seat of Coogee at the 1950 election, but was defeated by the incumbent Liberal Party member and future Speaker, Kevin Ellis. This was the first of seven elections over 18 years were contested by Walsh and Ellis. Walsh defeated Ellis, during a statewide swing to Labor, at the next election in 1953. However, he was again defeated by Ellis at the 1956,1956 when Labor's vote fell because of the split in the federal party caused by the formation of the DLP. Walsh was unsuccessful at the 1959 election, but defeated Ellis in 1962. Ellis regained the seat, yet again, in the general anti-Labor swing that resulted in the defeat of the Renshaw government in 1965 to regain the seat, Walsh made a final unsuccessful attempt to win the seat in 1968. He did not hold party, parliamentary or ministerial office.

Civic offices
Preceded by Lionel Bowen	Mayor of Randwick; 1952	Succeeded by Matthew Dwyer
New South Wales Legislative Assembly
Preceded by Kevin Ellis	Member for Coogee; 1953–1956	Succeeded by Kevin Ellis
Preceded by Kevin Ellis	Member for Coogee; 1962–1965	Succeeded by Kevin Ellis
