= Paul Pearce =

Australian politician

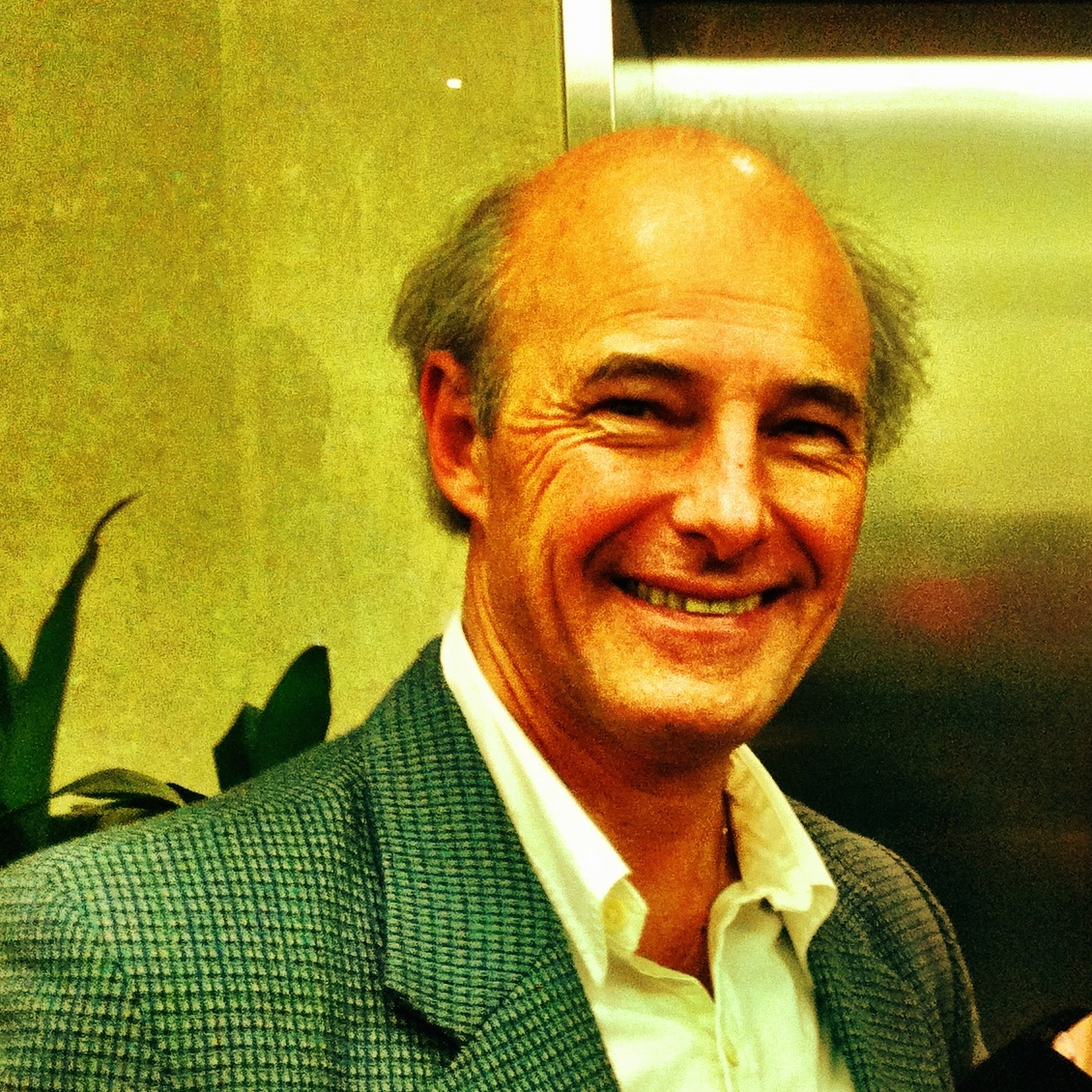

Member of the New South Wales Parliament for Coogee
- In office 22 March 2003 – 26 March 2011
- Preceded by: Ernie Page
- Succeeded by: Bruce Notley-Smith

Mayor of Waverley
- In office September 1997 – 8 April 2004
- Deputy: Peter Moscatt; Mora Main
- Preceded by: Barbara Armitage
- Succeeded by: Peter Moscatt

Deputy Mayor of Waverley
- In office September 1991 – September 1997
- Mayor: Barbara Armitage
- Preceded by: R. Griggs
- Succeeded by: Peter Moscatt

Councillor of Waverley Council for Waverley Ward
- In office September 1983 – 23 March 2004

Personal details
- Born: 7 February 1956 (age 70)
- Party: Labor Party
- Education: University of Sydney

Paul Ronald Pearce (born 7 February 1956) is an Australian former politician. He was a member of the New South Wales Legislative Assembly representing Coogee between 2003 and 2011 for the Labor Party and Mayor of Waverley from 1997 to 2004.

== Early life and education ==
Pearce was educated at Granville Public School, Bronte Public School (where he was Dux) and Sydney Boys High School. He won academic prizes for 1st Level Ancient History and 1st Level Economics. He has received a Bachelor of Arts and Master of Arts from the University of Sydney and a Bachelor of Laws (Hons) from the University of London External Programme. He obtained an International Practice Diploma in International Human Rights Law from the International Bar Association. He has received a Master of Laws from Aberystwyth University in International Human Rights and Humanitarian Law. His thesis was entitled "Anti-terrorism laws - time for a rethink?".

== Political career ==
He joined the Australian Labor Party in 1974. He was elected to the executive of NSW Young Labor in 1978, became National Secretary of Australian Young Labor in 1980 and President of Australian Young Labor in 1981. He was also Senior Vice President of NSW Young Labor in 1981. In 1976, he was employed as a legal search clerk and joined the Federated Clerks Union (now the USU). He subsequently was self-employed in the textile industry between 1978 and 1997. He contested Waverley Ward of Waverley Council in 1980 but was not elected. He recontested in 1983 and was elected. He was a councillor of Waverley Municipal Council between 1983 and 2004, serving as Mayor of Waverley between 1997 and 2004. From 1996 to 2001, he was the director of the Southern Sydney Waste Management Board. He stood unsuccessfully for the federal seat of Wentworth in 1993, 1996 and 1998. In 1998, he took the historically safe Liberal seat of Wentworth to preferences for the first time in over 50 years.

While Mayor of Waverley Council, Pearce was noted for his pony tail, but this was ruled out by Labor party organisers at the 2003 election. He was successful in being elected to the seat of Coogee in 2003 and subsequently was re-elected in 2007. At the 2011 state election, Pearce lost the seat of Coogee to Liberal Party candidate and former City of Randwick Mayor Bruce Notley-Smith. Pearce was one of several Labor MPs from comfortably safe Labor seats who were swept out in the massive Coalition landslide that year. He'd previously held Coogee with a majority of seven percent, but was toppled on a 15 percent swing. He recontested the seat for Labor at the 2015 elections but whilst obtaining a substantial swing to Labor, he was unable to retake the seat.

Civic offices
Preceded by R. Griggs	Deputy Mayor of Waverley; 1991–1997	Succeeded by Peter Moscatt
Preceded by Barbara Armitage	Mayor of Waverley; 1997–2004	Succeeded by Peter Moscatt
New South Wales Legislative Assembly
Preceded by Ernie Page	Member for Coogee; 2003–2011	Succeeded by Bruce Notley-Smith
