= Electoral district of Coogee =

Coogee New South Wales—Legislative Assembly
- Interactive map of district boundaries from the 2023 state election
- State: New South Wales
- Dates current: 1927–present
- MP: Marjorie O'Neill
- Party: Labor
- Namesake: Coogee, New South Wales
- Electors: 59,486 (2023)
- Area: 12.69 km^{2} (4.9 sq mi)
- Demographic: Inner-metropolitan
Electorates around Coogee:
Sydney	Vaucluse	Pacific Ocean
Heffron	Coogee	Pacific Ocean
Maroubra	Maroubra	Pacific Ocean

Coogee is an electoral district of the Legislative Assembly in the Australian state of New South Wales located south-east of Sydney CBD. It is represented by Marjorie O'Neill of the Australian Labor Party.

== Geography ==
On its current boundaries, Coogee includes the suburbs of Bondi, Bondi Junction, Bronte, Clovelly, Coogee, Queens Park, South Coogee, Tamarama and Waverley and parts of Kingsford, Maroubra, Randwick and the University of New South Wales.

== Members for Coogee ==
Member	Party	Period
Hyman Goldstein	Nationalist	1927–1928
John Dunningham	Nationalist	1928–1931
John Dunningham	United Australia	1931–1938
Thomas Mutch	United Australia	1938–1941
Lou Cunningham	Labor	1941–1948
Kevin Ellis	Liberal	1948–1953
Lou Walsh	Labor	1953–1956
Kevin Ellis	Liberal	1956–1962
Lou Walsh	Labor	1962–1965
Kevin Ellis	Liberal	1965–1973
Ross Freeman	Liberal	1973–1974
Michael Cleary	Labor	1974–1991
Ernie Page	Labor	1991–2003
Paul Pearce	Labor	2003–2011
Bruce Notley-Smith	Liberal	2011–2019
Marjorie O'Neill	Labor	2019–present

== Election results ==
2023 New South Wales state election: Coogee
Party	Candidate	Votes	%	±%
Labor	Marjorie O'Neill	22,153	45.2	+10.7
Liberal	Kylie von Muenster	16,121	32.9	−7.5
Greens	Rafaela Pandolfini	7,927	16.2	+1.2
Sustainable Australia	Lluisa Murray	1,058	2.2	+0.8
Informed Medical Options	Alicia Mosquera	924	1.9	+1.9
Animal Justice	Simon Garrod	821	1.7	−0.2
Total formal votes		49,004	98.1	+0.1
Informal votes		930	1.9	−0.1
Turnout		49,934	83.9	−1.4
Two-party-preferred result
Labor	Marjorie O'Neill	28,440	62.3	+10.0
Liberal	Kylie von Muenster	17,221	37.7	−10.0
Labor hold		Swing	+10.0	
