= Lou Cunningham =

Australian politician (1889–1948)

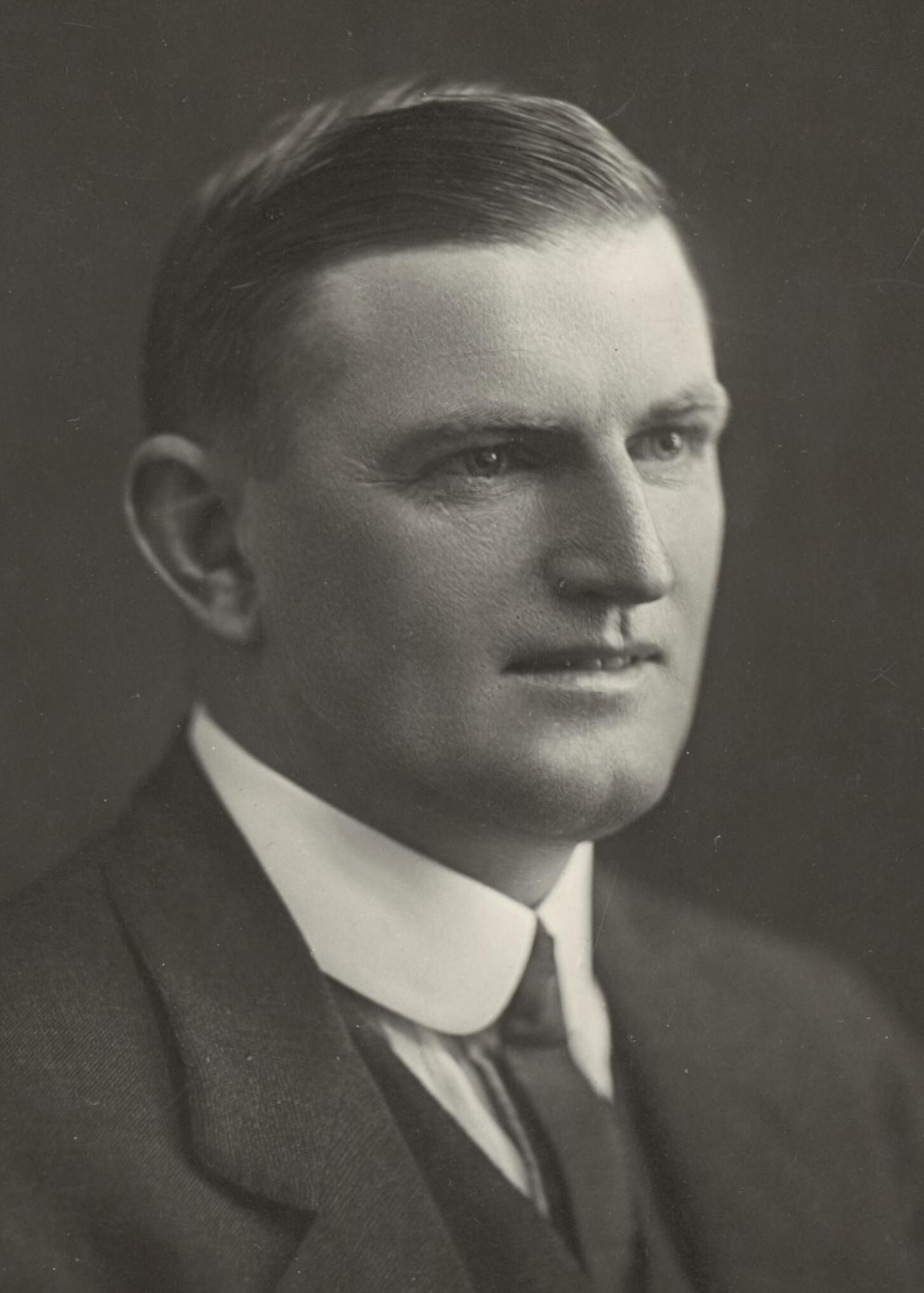

Member of the Australian Parliament for Gwydir
- In office 13 December 1919 – 14 November 1925
- Preceded by: William Webster
- Succeeded by: Aubrey Abbott
- In office 12 October 1929 – 19 December 1931
- Preceded by: Aubrey Abbott
- Succeeded by: Aubrey Abbott

Personal details
- Born: 4 June 1889 Inverell, New South Wales
- Died: 23 March 1948 (aged 58)
- Party: Australian Labor Party
- Spouse: Catherine Crosby
- Occupation: Unionist, farmer

Lucien Lawrence "Lou" Cunningham (4 June 1889 – 23 March 1948) was an Australian farmer and politician.

== Early life ==
Cunningham was born at Inverell, New South Wales, to a farmer, Eugene Cunningham, and his wife Mary, née Edgeworth, both born in Ireland. He was educated at Goonoowigall Public School and eventually ran the family farm. He became involved in the Australian Workers' Union.

== Politics ==
Cunningham was president of the local branches of the No Conscription League and the Australian Labor Party, and, having failed to enter the New South Wales Legislative Assembly in 1917 via the seat of Gough, he defeated Labor defector William Webster in 1919 to take the seat of Gwydir in the Australian House of Representatives. A Catholic, Cunningham was a staunch opponent of communism. He was promoted to the executive of the party, but lost Gwydir to Aubrey Abbott of the Country Party in 1925.

Cunningham again became a farmer and married Catherine Crosby at Coogee on 3 September 1927. He attempted to regain Gwydir in 1928 but failed, but the following year regained it, largely as a result of James Scullin's influence as Prime Minister. Cunningham was nominated as Deputy Speaker in 1931, but Charles McGrath refused to resign and the move failed. Unlike many colleagues, Cunningham remained loyal to the Labor Party through its many splits, and (being tall and around 108 kg) was nicknamed "the Goonoowigall Giant" and "Australia's biggest cabinet minister". He lost his seat at the Scullin government's landslide loss in 1931 and, although he attempted to return as a candidate for East Sydney in 1932, he was defeated by Lang Labor candidate Eddie Ward.

Cunningham was a staunch opponent of Jack Lang and his party, and stood for the Legislative Assembly seat of Coogee after Lang's removal as leader. He unexpectedly won in 1941, partly due to his own political skills and partly due to the invigorated Labor under William McKell. Cunningham retained the seat until his death on 23 March 1948 of a coronary occlusion; he was survived by his wife and two sons.

Parliament of Australia
Preceded by William Webster	Member for Gwydir; 1919–1925	Succeeded by Aubrey Abbott
Preceded by Aubrey Abbott	Member for Gwydir; 1929–1931	Succeeded by Aubrey Abbott
New South Wales Legislative Assembly
Preceded by Thomas Mutch	Member for Coogee; 1941–1948	Succeeded by Kevin Ellis
