= John Dunningham =

Australian politician

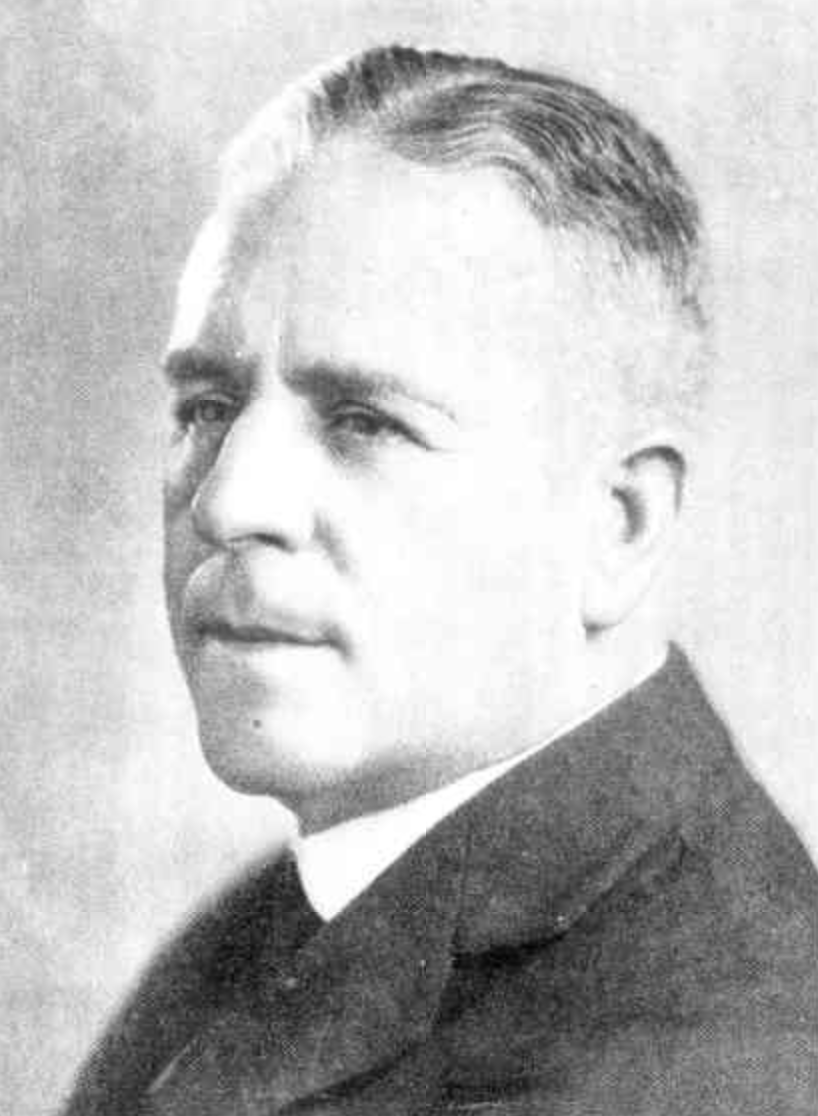
J. M. Dunningham

John Montgomery Dunningham (21 January 1884 – 26 May 1938) was an Australian politician.

He was born in Sydney to labourer John Dunningham and Annie, née Fowler. He attended Forest Lodge Public School and St. James College in Sydney before working as a clerk at the School of Arts library. On 22 February 1913, he married Mary Agnes Britnall Hossack, with whom he had a son. He continued to work as a clerk in various positions, and served on Randwick Council from 1917 to 1931 (mayor 1927–28). In 1928 he was elected to the New South Wales Legislative Assembly as the Nationalist member for Coogee; he was appointed Minister for Labour and Industry in 1932. In that year, he also served on the council of the National Roads and Motorists Association and he held many sporting positions, including chairman of the Royal Life Saving Association and vice-president of the New South Wales Rugby Union. Dunningham died in Sydney in 1938. He was knighted posthumously in recognition of his work as minister in charge of the New South Wales 150th anniversary celebrations.

Civic offices
Preceded by Ernest Tresidder	Mayor of Randwick; 1927 – 1928	Succeeded by John Jennings
New South Wales Legislative Assembly
Preceded by Hyman Goldstein	Member for Coogee; 1928–1938	Succeeded by Thomas Mutch
