= Michael Cleary (rugby) =

Australian sportsman and politician

The Honourable Michael Cleary AO
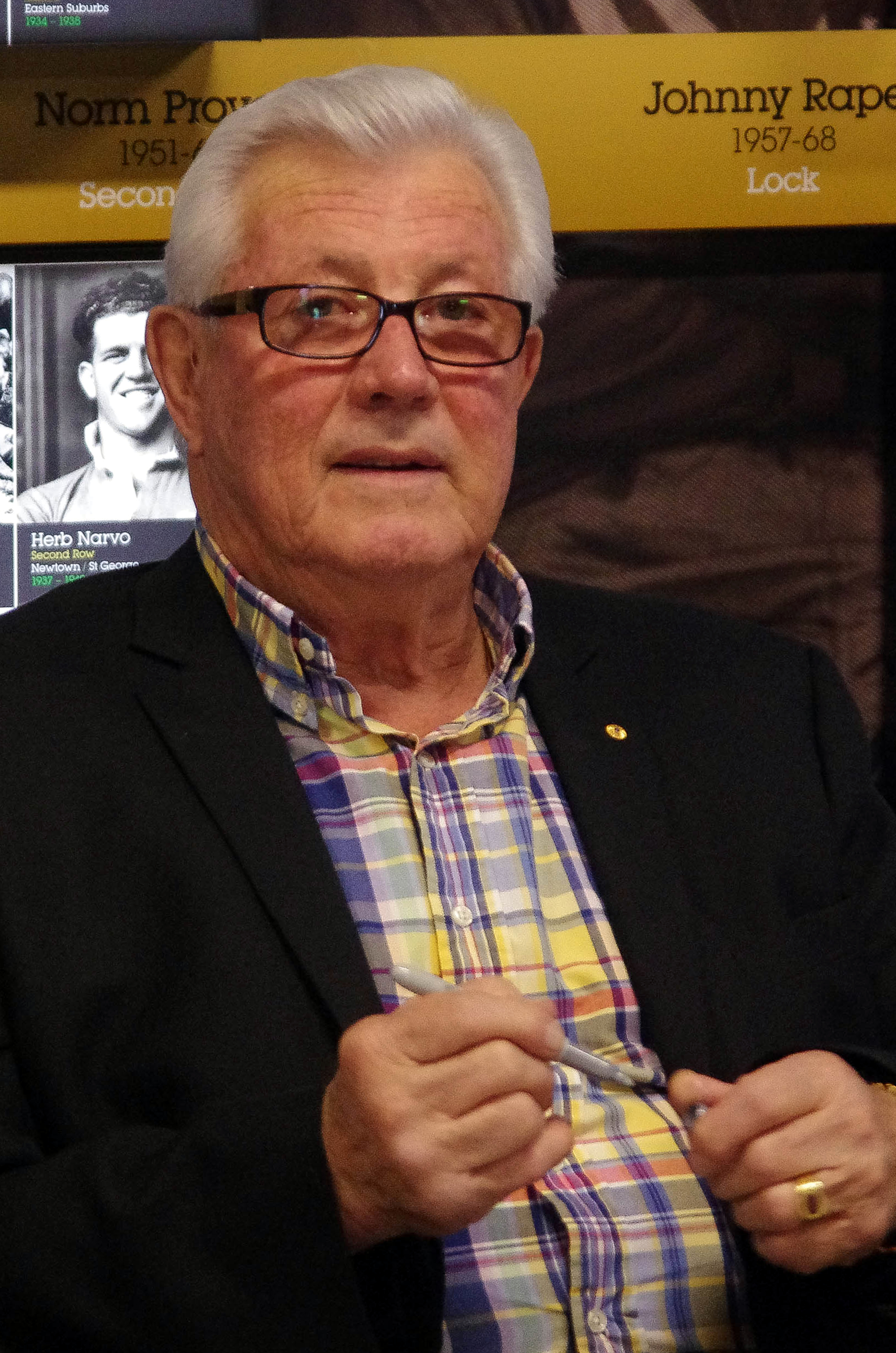

Minister for Sport and Recreation
- In office 2 October 1981 – 26 May 1982
- Premier: Neville Wran
- Preceded by: Ken Booth
- Succeeded by: Himself (Leisure, Sport and Tourism)
- In office 10 February 1984 – 25 March 1988
- Premier: Neville Wran; Barrie Unsworth
- Preceded by: Himself (Leisure, Sport and Tourism)
- Succeeded by: Bob Rowland Smith (Sport, Recreation and Racing)

Minister for Tourism
- In office 2 October 1981 – 26 May 1982
- Premier: Neville Wran
- Preceded by: Ken Booth
- Succeeded by: Himself (Leisure, Sport and Tourism)
- In office 10 February 1984 – 25 March 1988
- Premier: Neville Wran; Barrie Unsworth
- Preceded by: Himself (Leisure, Sport and Tourism)
- Succeeded by: Garry West

Minister for Leisure, Sport and Tourism
- In office 26 May 1982 – 10 February 1984
- Premier: Neville Wran
- Preceded by: Himself (Sport and Recreation); Himself (Tourism)
- Succeeded by: Himself (Sport and Recreation); Himself (Tourism)

Minister for Racing
- In office 4 July 1986 – 25 March 1988
- Premier: Barrie Unsworth
- Preceded by: Position created
- Succeeded by: Bob Rowland Smith (Sport, Recreation and Racing)

Member of the New South Wales Parliament for Coogee
- In office 20 July 1974 – 3 May 1991
- Preceded by: Ross Freeman
- Succeeded by: Ernie Page

Personal details
- Born: Michael Arthur Cleary; 30 April 1940 (age 86) Dover Heights, New South Wales
- School: Waverley College 1947–1958

Rugby union career
- Position: Wing
Amateur team(s)
Years	Team	Apps	(Points)
1959–1960	Randwick DRUFC		
–	New South Wales		
International career
Years	Team	Apps	(Points)
1961	Wallabies	6	(12)
- Rugby league career

Playing information
- Position: Wing
Club
Years	Team	Pld	T	G	FG	P
1962–70	South Sydney Rabbitohs	139	88	1	0	266
1971	Eastern Suburbs	13	5	0	0	15
	Total	152	93	1	0	281
Representative
Years	Team	Pld	T	G	FG	P
1962–69	NSW	11				39
1962–69	Australia	8	5	0	0	15
Medal record
Men's athletics
Representing Australia
Commonwealth Games
Bronze medal – third place	1962 Perth	100 yards

Michael Arthur Cleary AO (born 30 April 1940) is an Australian former rugby union and rugby league footballer of the 1950s, 1960s and 1970s, and a politician. He represented Australia in both rugby codes as well as in athletics making him one of only four Australians who have represented their country at full international level in three different sports. He represented as a Wallaby in six Tests in 1961 and as a Kangaroo in eight Tests from 1962.

== Early life ==
Cleary was born in Dover Heights, New South Wales and was educated at Waverley College. In 1943 having initially lived in Hardy street, his family moved to 17 Rodney Street, Dover Heights, where his father had built a new family home. At age 17, having set a number of schoolboy sprint records, he was offered a sporting scholarship to Stanford University, which he declined, with his sights set on representing Australia in athletics.

== Rugby union ==
In 1959 he joined the Randwick DRUFC and played in the club's 1960 winning first-grade premiership side. He was selected in the Australian national side for all three Tests of the 1961 series against Fiji and made further Wallaby appearances against France, and against the Springboks on the 1961 tour of South Africa.

== Athletics ==
After leaving rugby union, during his first year of rugby league with the South Sydney Rabbitohs, Cleary maintained his amateur status to enable his selection for the Commonwealth Games later that year. He represented Australia in athletics at the 1962 British Empire and Commonwealth Games in Perth, placing third in the 100-yard sprint. He recorded 9.3 secs for the 100 yards during his athletic career.

In 1964 he beat the rugby league speedster Ken Irvine in a A£2,000 match race at Wentworth Park, and in 1966 he won the Australian professional 130m sprint race.

== Rugby league ==
Cleary joined the South Sydney Rabbitohs in 1962 along with Jim Lisle his Wallaby three-quarter partner. Cleary was a Winger with the club throughout the 1960s playing in three premiership winning sides in 1967, 1968 and 1970. Cleary finished his first grade career with the Rabbitoh's neighbouring club, the Eastern Suburbs Roosters, in 1971. This made him ideally suited to represent his future NSW State electoral district of Coogee, which sits close to the geographic border between the two clubs.

His international rugby league debut in the 1st Test against Great Britain in Sydney on 9 June 1962 saw Cleary become Australia's 29th dual-code international, following Arthur Summons and preceding Jim Lisle. He made Test appearances against New Zealand in 1963, 1965 and 1969; against France in 1964 and was selected for the 1963–64 Kangaroo tour of Great Britain and France during which he made one Test and twenty tour match appearances.

== Triple international ==
He is one of only four Australian sportsmen to represent internationally in three different sports at the senior level (see also Dick Thornett, Snowy Baker and Wal Mackney).

== Politics and community ==
Cleary joined the Australian Labor Party in 1965 and was the State member for Coogee in the New South Wales Legislative Assembly from 1974 to 1991 and was the NSW Minister for Sport and Recreation and Tourism in the Wran Labor Government from 1981 to 1988. From 1986 to 1988 he was also the NSW Minister for Racing.

He was at one time or another the Chairman Sports House Advisory Committee, member North Bondi Surf Life Saving Club, member Coogee Surf Life Saving Club and a director South Sydney Leagues Club.

In the Queen's Birthday Honours list of 1992, Cleary was awarded an Officer of the Order of Australia for his service to the New South Wales Parliament, and in 2000 he was awarded the Australian Sports Medal for his achievements as a Kangaroo player. He was inducted into the Sport Australia Hall of Fame in 1999.

Cleary was a wrestling commentator for World Championship Wrestling.

New South Wales Legislative Assembly
Preceded by Ross Freeman	Member for Coogee; 1974–1991	Succeeded by Ernie Page
Political offices
Preceded by Ken Booth	Minister for Sport and Recreation; 1981–1982	Succeeded by Himself as Minister for Leisure, Sport and Tourism
Preceded by Ken Booth	Minister for Tourism; 1981–1982	Succeeded by Himself as Minister for Leisure, Sport and Tourism
Preceded by Himself as Minister for Sport and Recreation and Minister for Tourism	Minister for Leisure, Sport and Tourism; 1982–1984	Succeeded by Himself as Minister for Sport and Recreation and Minister for Tourism
Preceded by Himself as Minister for Leisure, Sport and Tourism	Minister for Sport and Recreation; 1984–1988	Succeeded by Bob Rowland Smith
Preceded by Himself as Minister for Leisure, Sport and Tourism	Minister for Tourism; 1984–1988	Succeeded by Garry West
New title	Minister for Racing; 1986–1988	Succeeded by Bob Rowland Smith
