= Ross Freeman (politician) =

Australian politician

Ross Buchanan Freeman (born 25 February 1947) is a former Australian politician. He was the Liberal member for Coogee in the New South Wales Legislative Assembly from 1973 to 1974.

Freeman was born in Maroubra to Arthur and Wilhelmina Freeman. He was educated at Daceyville Primary School and Maroubra Bay High School before becoming a clerk in the Supreme Court for the Attorney-General's Department. He studied law part-time, and was eventually admitted to the bar in 1971. In 1965 he became a volunteer in the Liberal Party, joining officially in 1967. He held various positions in the party in the Coogee and Randwick areas.

In 1973, following the retirement of Liberal MP Kevin Ellis, Freeman was preselected as the candidate for Ellis's seat of Coogee. In a closely fought race, Freeman emerged with an eight-vote majority over Labor candidate Michael Cleary. The result was later overturned by the Court of Disputed Returns, and a by-election was ordered. Held in 1974, the by-election resulted in a very narrow victory for Cleary. Freeman was subsequently vice-president of the Gordon State Conference of the Liberal Party (1975–1980), and has been President of the Balmoral branch since 1984.

New South Wales Legislative Assembly
Preceded by Kevin Ellis	Member for Coogee; 1973–1974	Succeeded by Michael Cleary
