= McKay shadow ministry =

2019–2021 government opposition in New South Wales, Australia

The shadow ministry of Jodi McKay was the Labor opposition from July 2019 to May 2021, opposing the Berejiklian government in the Parliament of New South Wales. It was led by Jodi McKay following her election as leader of the party and NSW Leader of the Opposition on 29 June 2019. The shadow ministry was announced on 3 July 2019.

The shadow cabinet was made up of 27 members of the NSW Labor caucus. 3 of the shadow ministers quit the shadow ministry in May 2021, culminating in the resignation of McKay as Leader of the Opposition on 28 May 2021. One of the shadow ministers who quit, Chris Minns, became the new Leader of the Opposition the following week, and the McKay shadow ministry was replaced by the Minns shadow ministry.

== Shadow cabinet ==
Officeholder	Office(s)	Faction
Jodi McKay MP	Leader of the Opposition; Shadow Minister for Multiculturalism	Centre Unity
Yasmin Catley MP	Deputy Leader of the Opposition; Shadow Minister for Rural and Regional Jobs; Shadow Minister for Building Reform and Property	NSW left
Ryan Park MP	Shadow Minister for Health; Shadow Minister for Housing and Homelessness; Shadow Minister for the Illawarra and South Coast; Manager of Opposition Business	Centre Unity
Adam Searle MLC	Leader of the Opposition in the Legislative Council; Shadow Minister for Climate Change and Energy; Shadow Minister for Industrial Relations; Shadow Minister for Planning and Better Living; Shadow Minister for the North Coast	Centre Unity
Penny Sharpe MLC	Deputy Leader of the Opposition in the Legislative Council (until 14 May 2021); Shadow Minister for Family and Community Services (until 14 May 2021); Shadow Minister for Disability Inclusion (until 14 May 2021)	NSW left
Walt Secord MLC	Shadow Treasurer (until 25 May 2021); Shadow Minister for the Arts (until 25 May 2021); Shadow Special Minister of State (until 25 May 2021)	Centre Unity
Paul Lynch MP	Shadow Attorney-General	NSW left
Prue Car MP	Shadow Minister for Education	Centre Unity
John Graham MLC	Shadow Minister for Roads; Shadow Minister for Music and the Night Time Economy	NSW left
Kate Washington MP	Shadow Minister for Environment and Heritage; Shadow Minister for Rural Health	Centre Unity
Chris Minns MP	Shadow Minister for Transport (until 25 May 2021); Shadow Minister for Corrections (until 25 May 2021)	Centre Unity
Sophie Cotsis MP	Shadow Minister for Better Public Services	Centre Unity
Mick Veitch MLC	Shadow Minister for Industry and Trade; Shadow Minister for Rural Roads; Shadow Minister for Rural Affairs; Shadow Minister for Western New South Wales	NSW left
Daniel Mookhey MLC	Shadow Minister for Finance and Small Business; Shadow Minister for the Gig Economy	Centre Unity
Lynda Voltz MP	Shadow Minister for Police and Counter-Terrorism; Shadow Minister for Sport and Recreation	NSW left
David Harris MP	Shadow Minister for Regional Transport; Shadow Minister for Aboriginal Affairs and Treaty; Shadow Minister for the Central Coast	Centre Unity
Clayton Barr MP	Shadow Minister for Water; Shadow Minister for Innovation, Science and Tertiary Education; Shadow Minister for the Hunter	Centre Unity
Jihad Dib MP	Shadow Minister for Skills and TAFE; Shadow Minister for Youth; Shadow Minister for Juvenile Justice; Shadow Minister Assisting on Multiculturalism	Centre Unity
Jenny Aitchison MP	Shadow Minister for Primary Industries; Shadow Minister for Investment and Tourism; Shadow Minister for Medical Research	Centre Unity
Greg Warren MP	Shadow Minister for Local Government; Shadow Minister for Veterans; Shadow Minister for Western Sydney	Centre Unity
Trish Doyle MP	Shadow Minister for Women and the Prevention of Domestic and Family Violence; Shadow Minister for Emergency Services; Legislative Assembly Deputy Whip	NSW left
Jo Haylen MP	Shadow Minister for Active Transport; Shadow Minister for Seniors and Volunteers; Shadow Minister for the Cost of Living	NSW left
Paul Scully MP	Shadow Minister for Natural Resources	Centre Unity
Jodie Harrison MP	Shadow Minister for Early Childhood Learning	NSW left
Julia Finn, MP	Shadow Minister for Consumer Protection; Shadow Minister for Carers	NSW left
Tara Moriarty MLC	Shadow Minister for Crown Lands; Shadow Minister for Mental Health	Centre Unity
Peter Primrose MLC	Shadow Cabinet Secretary	NSW left
Other Positions
Anna Watson MP	Legislative Assembly Whip	Centre Unity
Mark Buttigieg MLC	Legislative Council Whip	Centre Unity
Anthony D'Adam MLC	Legislative Council Deputy Whip	NSW left

== See also ==
- 2019 New South Wales state election
- Second Berejiklian ministry
- Shadow Ministry of Michael Daley
- Shadow Ministry of Chris Minns
