= 2019 New South Wales Labor Party leadership election =

Australian state political party election

- 7−29 June 2019
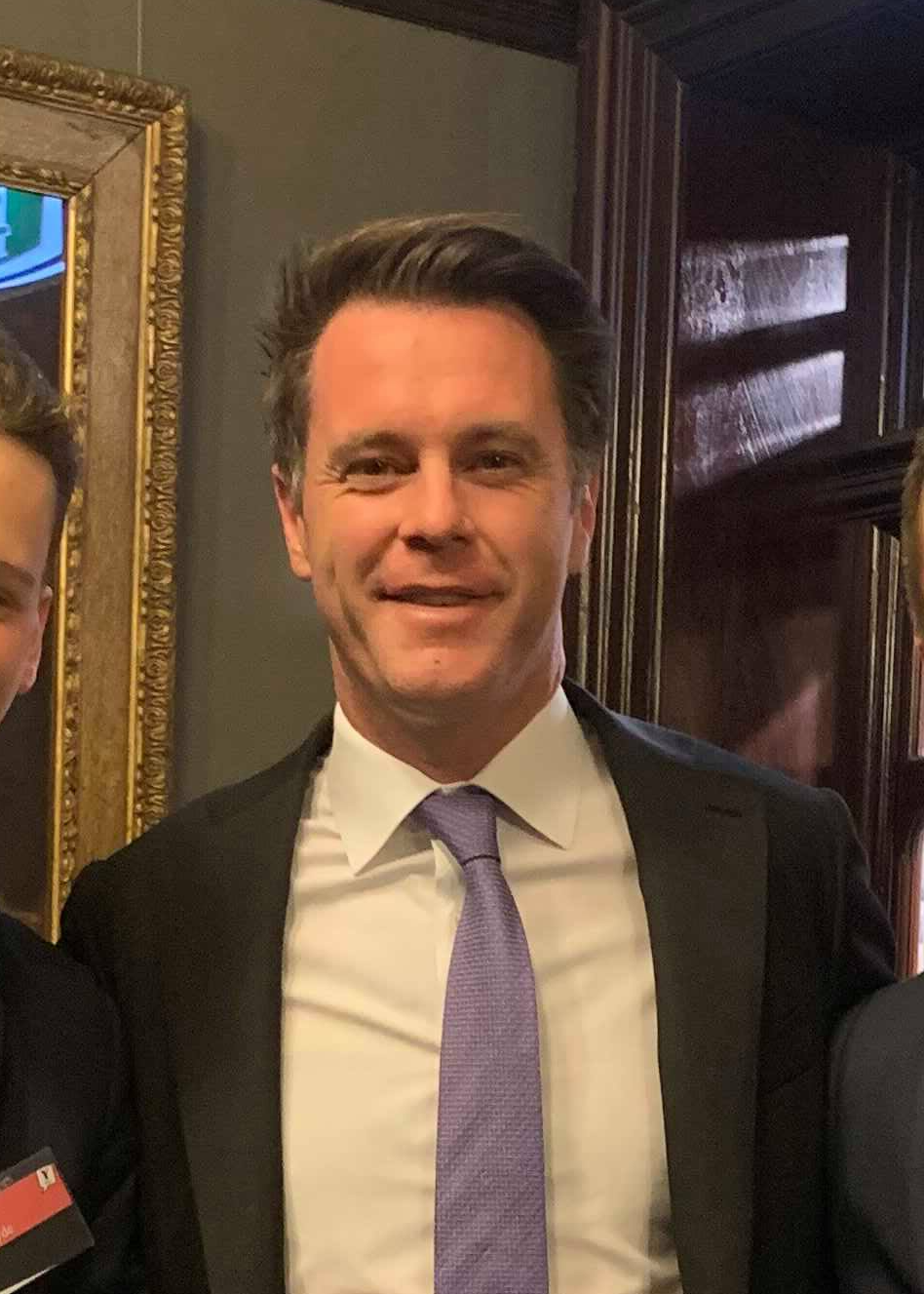
	ALP
Candidate	Jodi McKay	Chris Minns
Percentage	60.5%	39.5%
Caucus	29 (58.0%)	21 (42.0%)
Members	6,821 (63.0%)	4,001 (37.0%)
Seat	Strathfield	Kogarah
Leader before election
Michael Daley
(permanent leader)
Penny Sharpe
(interim leader)
Elected Leader
Jodi McKay

An election for the leadership of the New South Wales branch of the Australian Labor Party was held between 7 and 29 June 2019. The election was triggered by the resignation of Leader Michael Daley on 25 March 2019. The election was a combined vote by the party membership and the Labor members of the Parliament of New South Wales, with each component weighted equally. The party members were sent their ballots on 7 June and had until 21 June to return them, while the parliamentary caucus met on 29 June to cast their votes.

On 29 June, Jodi McKay was announced as the victor of the contest, winning 60.5% of the combined vote.

== Background ==
Following Labor's loss in the 2019 state election, then-leader Michael Daley resigned under pressure from the party caucus after initially declaring he would remain as head of the party and leader of the opposition. This triggered a leadership election to be held at an undetermined future date. Daley initially declared his intention to nominate for the leadership in the election, but on 26 March walked back on this statement. The contest was scheduled for after the 2019 federal election to avoid conflicting with Labor's federal campaign. Deputy leader Penny Sharpe served as interim leader after Daley's resignation.

== Campaign ==
On 23 May, Chris Minns announced he would contest the leadership. The following day, Jodi McKay announced she would also contest the leadership.

A leadership debate was held on 3 June between the two candidates.

- Minns emphasised the need for party renewal and rejuvenating Labor's image. Referring to Labor's losses in both the recent state and federal elections, he stated: "I am firmly of the belief that now is not the time for us to crawl up in a ball and for the Labor party not to believe in things. We are at our best when we believe in things. We are at our best when we stand for principles and fight for that." He said that his focus would be on liveable cities, privatisation, and climate change. He promised to better explain to voters that action on climate change was a necessary measure to protect both the state's environmental assets and its economy. He also emphasised a need to embrace immigrant communities, and make it clear that blame for the difficulties of overpopulation did not fall on immigration.
- McKay agreed that Labor's losses prompted a need for self-reflection within the party, and that new leadership presented opportunities for change. She stated that she had "[thought] about my values and the values that I bring to the Labor Party." She promised to prioritise homelessness, mental health, and education, seeking to increase teacher salaries and reduce class sizes. She said: "I want us to talk about the difficult issues; they're not popular but they're issues that demand a Labor Party response."

== Candidates ==
=== Nominated ===
- Chris Minns, Shadow Minister for Water - announced 23 May 2019
List of Chris Minns endorsements

Federal Members of the Australian Parliament

- Chris Bowen, Interim Leader of the Australian Labor Party (2013) Shadow Minister for Health (2019-2021); Former Shadow Treasurer of Australia (2013-2019); Treasurer of Australia (2013); Minister for Small Business (2013); Minister for Immigration and Citizenship (2010-2013); Minister for Financial Services and Superannuation (2009-2010); Assistant Treasurer of Australia (2007-2009); MP for McMahon (2010-present)
- Chris Hayes, MP for Fowler (2010-2022)
- Jason Clare, Shadow Minister for Regional Services, Territories and Local Government and Shadow Minister for Housing and Homelessness; Shadow Minister for Resources and Northern Australia and Shadow Minister for Trade and Investment (2016-2019); Shadow Minister for Communications (2013-2016); Former Minister for Justice (2011-2013); Former Minister for Home Affairs (2011-2013; Former Minister for Defence Materiel (2012-2013; 2010-2011; MP for Blaxland (2007-present)
- Linda Burney, Shadow Minister for Indigenous Australians (2019-2022), Shadow Minister for Families and Social Services (2016-2022); Federal Member of Parliament for Barton (2016-present); Former Deputy Leader of the Opposition of New South Wales (2011-2016); Former Deputy Leader of the New South Wales Labor Party (2011-2016); Former NSW Minister for Community Services (2008-2011); Former NSW Minister for Youth (2007-2008); Former MP for Canterbury (2003-2016)

Members of the New South Wales Parliament

- Anna Watson, MP for Shellharbour (2011-present)
- Courtney Houssos, State Labor Member of the New South Wales Legislative Council (2015-present)
- Guy Zangari, New South Wales Shadow Minister for Justice and Police (2016-present); New South Wales Shadow Minister for Corrections (2015-present); New South Wales Shadow Minister for Emergency Services (2015-2023); MP for Fairield (2011-present)
- Jihad Dib, New South Wales Shadow Minister for Education (2015-present); MP for Lakemba (2015-2019)
- Jo Haylen, MP for Summer Hill (2015-present)
- Nick Lalich, MP for Cabramatta (2008-2023); Former Mayor for the City of Fairfield (2004-2012)
- Rose Jackson, State Labor Member of the New South Wales Legislative Council (2019-present); Councillor of Waverley Council (2008-2012)
- Steve Kamper, MP for Rockdale (2015-present)
- Tania Mihailuk, MP for Bankstown (2011-present)
- Walt Secord, State Labor Member of the New South Wales Legislative Council (2011-2023)

Party Branch Officials

- Peter Sanger, Leader of the New South Wales Labor Party Orange Branch

Local Government Officials

- Stephen Lawrence, Country Labor Councilor for Dubbo Regional Council

Unions and Related Figures

- Daniel Walton, National Secretary of the Australian Workers Union
- Gerard Hayes, Secretary of the Health Services Union New South Wales, Queensland and Australian Capital Territory Branches
- Shop, Distributive and Allied Employees' Association New South Wales Branch (except for the Newcastle and Northern New South Wales branches)
- Health Services Union
- Australian Workers' Union

Other Figures

- Jack Ayoub, Labor candidate for Parkes at the 2019 Australian federal election
- Jodi McKay, Shadow Minister for Transport and Shadow Minister for Roads, Maritime and Freight - announced 24 May 2019
List of Jodi McKay endorsements

Federal Members of the Australian Parliament

- Justine Elliot, MP for Richmond (2004-present)
- Susan Templeman, MP for Macquarie (2016-present)

Premiers

- Barrie Unsworth, Former Premier of New South Wales (1986-1988)

Members of the New South Wales Parliament

- Michael Daley. Leader of the Opposition (2018-2019), MP for Maroubra (2005-present)
- Adam Searle, Leader of the Opposition in the New South Wales Legislative Council (2015-2019); Member of the New South Wales Legislative Council (2011-2023)
- Anthony D'Adam, State Labor Member of the New South Wales Legislative Council (2019-present)
- Stephen Bali, Mayor of the City of Blacktown (2014-2019); MP for Blacktown (2017-present)
- David Harris, MP for Wyong (2015-present; 2007-2011)
- Greg Warren, MP for Campbelltown (2015-present)
- Hugh McDermott, MP for Prospect (2015-present)
- Jenny Aitchison, MP for Maitland (2015-present)
- Jodie Harrison, MP for Charlestown (2014-present)
- Julia Finn, MP for Granville (2015-present)
- Kate Washington, MP for Port Stephens (2015-present)
- Lynda Voltz MP for Auburn (2019-present); Former State Labor Member of the New South Wales Legislative Council (2007-2019)
- Paul Lynch, MP for Liverpool (1995-2023)
- Peter Primrose, State Labor Member of the New South Wales Legislative Council (1996-present); Former President of the New South Wales Legislative Council (2007-2009); Former Alderman for the City of Campbelltown (1980-1991)
- Prue Car, MP for Londonderry (2015-present)
- Trish Doyle, MP for Blue Mountains (2015-present)
- Yasmin Catley, MP for Swansea (2015-present)

Local Government Officials

- Mark Greenhill OAM, Mayor and Labor Councilor for the City of Blue Mountains

Unions and Related Figures

- Construction, Forestry, Maritime, Mining and Energy Union (CFMMEU) New South Wales Branch
- Maritime Union of Australia Newcastle Branch

Other Figures

- Dr Annemarie Christie, Labor candidate for Riverstone at the 2019 New South Wales state election
- Durga Owen, Labor candidate for Seven Hills at the 2019 New South Wales state election
- Melanie Dagg, Labor candidate for Upper Hunter at the 2019 New South Wales state election

=== Withdrew ===
- Michael Daley, Leader of the Opposition (2018–2019) (endorsed Jodi McKay)

=== Declined ===
- Penny Sharpe, Interim Leader (2019−present) and Deputy Leader (2018−2019)
- Ryan Park, Shadow Treasurer
- Kate Washington, Shadow Minister for Early Childhood Education and Shadow Minister for the Hunter (endorsed Jodi McKay)

== Results ==
=== Caucus Votes ===
Votes in favour of Jodi McKay:

- Jodi McKay
- Jenny Aitchison
- Stephen Bali
- Clayton Barr
- Mark Buttigieg
- Prue Car
- Yasmin Catley
- Sophie Cotsis
- Tim Crakanthorp
- Anthony D'Adam
- Michael Daley
- Trish Doyle
- Julia Finn
- John Graham
- David Harris
- Jodi Harrison
- Paul Lynch
- Hugh McDermott
- Tara Moriarty
- Marjorie O'Neill
- Ryan Park
- Peter Primrose
- Adam Searle
- Leisl Tesch
- Mick Veitch
- Lynda Voltz
- Greg Warren
- Kate Washington
- Anna Watson

Votes in favour of Chris Minns

- Chris Minns
- Edmund Atalla
- Anoulack Chanthivong
- Jihad Dib
- Jo Haylen
- Greg Donnelly
- Ron Hoenig
- Courtney Houssos
- Sonia Hornery
- Rose Jackson
- Steve Kamper
- Nick Lalich
- David Mehan
- Tania Milhailuk
- Daniel Mookhey
- Shaoquett Moselmane
- Janelle Safin
- Paul Scully
- Penny Sharpe
- Walt Secord
- Guy Zangari

== See also ==
- 2015 New South Wales state election
- 2019 New South Wales state election
- 2015 New South Wales Labor Party leadership election
- 2018 New South Wales Labor Party leadership election
- 2018 Liberal Party of Australia leadership spills
- October 2013 Australian Labor Party leadership election
- 2019 Australian Labor Party leadership election
