= Daley shadow ministry =

The shadow ministry of Michael Daley was the Labor opposition from November 2018 to March 2019, opposing the Berejiklian coalition government in the Parliament of New South Wales.

The shadow cabinet was made up of 23 members of the NSW Labor caucus. The shadow cabinet comprised 'spokespeople' or 'shadow ministers' who aim to hold the government of the day to account.

== Members ==
Officeholder	Office(s)
Michael Daley MP	Leader of the Opposition
Penny Sharpe MLC	Deputy Leader of the Opposition; Shadow Minister for the Environment and Heritage; Shadow Minister for Trade
Ryan Park MP	Shadow Treasurer; Shadow Minister for Infrastructure; Shadow Minister for the Illawarra
Adam Searle MLC	Leader of the Opposition in the Legislative Council; Shadow Minister for Energy and Climate Change; Shadow Minister for Industrial Relations; Shadow Minister for Industry and Resources
Walt Secord MLC	Deputy Leader of the Opposition in the Legislative Council; Shadow Minister for Health; Shadow Minister for the Arts; Shadow Minister for Mental Health; Shadow Minister for Medical Research; Shadow Minister for the North Coast
Jodi McKay MP	Shadow Minister for Transport; Shadow Minister for Roads, Maritime and Freight
Paul Lynch MP	Shadow Attorney-General
Tania Mihailuk MP	Shadow Minister for Planning; Shadow Minister for Housing; Shadow Minister for Family and Community Services
Jihad Dib MP	Shadow Minister for Education
Sophie Cotsis MP	Shadow Minister for Women; Shadow Minister for Multiculturalism; Shadow Minister for Ageing; Shadow Minister for Disability Services
Peter Primrose MLC	Shadow Minister for Local Government and Communities; Shadow Minister for Regional Roads
Guy Zangari MP	Shadow Minister for Police; Shadow Minister for Corrections; Shadow Minister for Emergency Services
Kate Washington MP	Shadow Minister for Early Childhood Education; Shadow Minister for the Hunter
Prue Car MP	Shadow Minister for TAFE and Skills; Shadow Minister for Western Sydney
Mick Veitch MLC	Shadow Minister for Rural Affairs; Shadow Minister for Primary Industries; Shadow Minister for Lands; Shadow Minister for Western NSW
David Harris MP	Shadow Minister for Regional Development; Shadow Minister for Aboriginal Affairs; Shadow Assistant Minister for Education; Shadow Minister for the Central Coast
Clayton Barr MP	Shadow Minister for Finance, Services and Property
Jenny Aitchison MP	Shadow Minister for the Prevention of Domestic Violence and Sexual Assault; Shadow Minister for Small Business
Yasmin Catley MP	Shadow Minister for Innovation and Better Regulation
Chris Minns MP	Shadow Minister for Water
Lynda Voltz MLC	Shadow Minister for Sport; Shadow Minister for Veterans Affairs
John Graham MLC	Shadow Minister for Gaming and Racing; Shadow Minister for Tourism and Major Events; Shadow Minister for the Night Time Economy and Music; Shadow Minister for Forestry
Daniel Mookhey MLC	Shadow Cabinet Secretary

== See also ==
- 2019 New South Wales state election
- First Berejiklian ministry
- Shadow Ministry of Luke Foley
- Shadow Ministry of Jodi McKay
