= Daley =

Daley, originally an Irish family name derived from the Gaelic Ó Dálaigh, as a surname, may refer to:

== People ==
=== Given name ===
- Daley Blind (born 1990), Dutch footballer
- Daley Mena (born 1985), Colombian footballer
- Daley Ojuederie (born 1985), professional boxer featured on the British TV show Big Brother 14
- Hot Since 82, real name Daley Padley, British DJ
- Daley Peters (born 1984), Canadian curler
- Daley Sinkgraven (born 1995), Dutch footballer
- Daley Thompson (born 1958), British decathlete, born Francis Morgan Thompson
- Daley Williams (born 1986), rugby league footballer

=== Surname ===
- Arthur Daley (sportswriter) (1904–1974), columnist for The New York Times
- Ben Daley (born 1988), Australian Rugby League player
- Brian Daley (1947–1996), American science fiction novelist
- Brian E. Daley (born 1940), American Jesuit and theologian
- Bud Daley (born 1932), American professional Major League baseball pitcher
- Caroline Daley, New Zealand historian
- Cass Daley (1915–1975), American radio and movie actress
- Clayton Daley (born 1951), chief financial officer of The Procter & Gamble Company
- Debra Daley, New Zealand author
- Denise Daley, Jamaican politician
- Dennis Daley (born 1996), American football player
- Earl Daley (born 1958), Jamaican reggae singer better known as Earl Sixteen
- Eleanor Daley (composer) (born 1955), Canadian composer
- Eleanor "Sis" Daley (1907–2003), wife of former Chicago mayor Richard J. Daley and mother of former mayor Richard M. Daley
- Gareth Daley (born 1989), English musician and soul singer
- George W. Daley (1875–1952), American newspaper editor, sports writer, and syndicated author
- Grace Daley (born 1978), professional basketball player
- Harry Daley (1901–1971), the first openly gay British police officer
- Héctor Daley (born 1961), Panamanian sprinter
- Jane Daley (ice hockey) (born 2009), American ice hockey player
- Jim Daley (born 1953), coach in the Canadian Football League
- Jimmy Daley (born 1973), English cricketer
- John Daley (jockey) (1846–?), British jockey
- John Daley (baseball) (1887–1988), American baseball player
- John Daley (RAF officer) (1898–1918), World War I flying ace
- John Daley (cricketer) (1906–1986), English cricketer
- John Daley (boxer) (1909–1963), American boxer and Olympic silver medalist
- John J. Daley (1923–2000), American politician and lieutenant governor of Vermont
- John M. Daley (1923–2015), American politician and member of the Illinois House of Representatives
- John P. Daley (born 1946), American politician and member of the Cook County Board of Commissioners
- John Francis Daley (born 1985), American actor
- John Phillips Daley (1910–1963), U.S. Army lieutenant general
- Kevin Daley (basketball) (born 1976), Panamanian basketball player
- Kevin Daley (politician) (born 1957), American politician
- Laurie Daley (born 1969), Australian rugby league football commentator and former player
- Lloyd Daley (1939–2018), Jamaican electronic technician, sound system pioneer and reggae producer
- Louis P. Daley (1868–1930), American politician and farmer
- Michael Daley (born 1965), Australian politician
- Omar Daley (born 1981), Jamaican footballer
- Patricia Daley, Jamaican human geographer and academic
- Pete Daley (1930–2024), American catcher in Major League Baseball
- Richard J. Daley (1902–1976), American Mayor of Chicago, father of Richard M. Daley
- Richard M. Daley (born 1942), American Mayor of Chicago, son of Richard J. Daley
- Robert Daley (1930–2026), American journalist and writer
- Spencer Weir-Daley, (born 1953), English footballer
- Steve Daley (born 1953), English footballer
- Tae Daley (born 1998), American gridiron football player
- Tom Daley (diver) (born 1994), British Olympic diver
- Tony Daley (born 1967), English footballer
- Trevor Daley (born 1983), Canadian professional ice hockey player in the National Hockey League
- Troy Cassar-Daley (born 1952), Maltese-Australian and Aboriginal country musician
- Vi Daley, alderman in the Chicago City Council 1999–2011
- Victor Daley (1858–1905), Australian poet
- William M. Daley (born 1948), White House Chief of Staff to President Barack Obama, United States Secretary of Commerce, brother of Chicago mayor Richard M. Daley

=== Also ===
- Daley family, powerful political family in Illinois, U.S.

== Fictional characters ==
- Daley Marin, from the American TV series Flight 29 Down, played by Hallee Hirsh
- Daley Wong, from the OVA series Bubblegum Crisis Tokyo 2040, voiced by Chris Patton
- Arthur Daley, fictional character in the British TV series Minder
- Larry Daley, from the film franchise Night at the Museum, played by Ben Stiller

== See also ==
- Daley Plaza, alternate name for the Richard J. Daley Center in the city of Chicago, Illinois
- Daly (disambiguation)
- Dailey, surname
- Daily (disambiguation)
- Dealey (disambiguation)
- Daleyville (disambiguation)
- Ó Dálaigh
