= Penny Sharpe =

Australian politician (born 1970)

The Honourable Penny Sharpe MLC
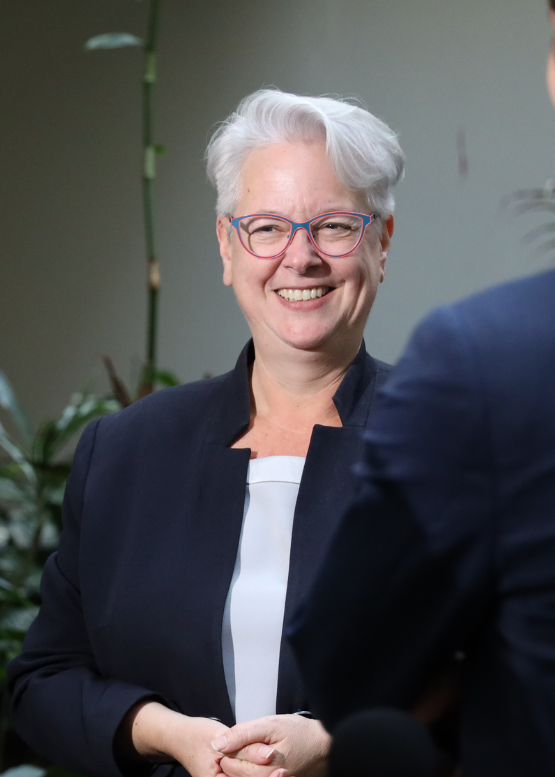
- Penny Sharpe in October 2023

Leader of the Government in the Legislative Council
- Incumbent
- Assumed office 28 March 2023
- Premier: Chris Minns
- Deputy: John Graham
- Preceded by: Damien Tudehope

Minister for the Environment Minister for Heritage Minister for Climate Change
- Incumbent
- Assumed office 28 March 2023
- Premier: Chris Minns
- Preceded by: James Griffin (as Minister for Environment and Heritage)

Minister for Energy
- Incumbent
- Assumed office 28 March 2023
- Premier: Chris Minns
- Preceded by: Matt Kean
Opposition roles
Leader of the Opposition in the Legislative Council
In office 8 June 2021 – 28 March 2023
Deputy	John Graham
Preceded by	Adam Searle
Succeeded by	Damien Tudehope
Deputy Leader of the Opposition in the Legislative Council
In office 2 July 2019 – 14 May 2021
Leader	Jodi McKay
Preceded by	Walt Secord
Succeeded by	John Graham
Leader of the Opposition in New South Wales
Acting
In office 25 March 2019 – 29 June 2019
Premier	Gladys Berejiklian
Preceded by	Michael Daley
Succeeded by	Jodi McKay
Deputy Leader of the Opposition in New South Wales
In office 10 November 2018 – 29 June 2019
Leader	Michael Daley
Preceded by	Michael Daley
Succeeded by	Yasmin Catley
Party positions
Leader of the New South Wales Labor Party
Acting
In office 25 March 2019 – 29 June 2019
Preceded by	Michael Daley
Succeeded by	Jodi McKay
Deputy Leader of the New South Wales Labor Party
In office 10 November 2018 – 25 March 2019
Leader	Michael Daley
Preceded by	Michael Daley
Succeeded by	Yasmin Catley

Member of the New South Wales Legislative Council
- Incumbent
- Assumed office 6 May 2015
- In office 11 October 2005 – 5 March 2015
- Preceded by: Carmel Tebbutt

Councillor of Marrickville Council for West Ward
- In office 23 March 2004 – 13 September 2008

Personal details
- Born: 22 October 1970 (age 56) Canberra, Australian Capital Territory
- Party: Labor
- Spouse: Jo Tilly
- Children: 3
- Education: University of New South Wales
- Website: www.pennysharpe.com

Penelope Gail Sharpe (born 22 October 1970) is an Australian politician. She has served as a member of the New South Wales Legislative Council since 2005, representing the Labor Party. Since March 2023, Sharpe is the Leader of the Government in the Legislative Council and the Vice-President of the Executive Council since Labor's election victory in March 2023, having previously served as leader of the opposition in the Legislative Council between 2021 and 2023.

In the Labor Party leadership contest in November 2018, Sharpe was elected Deputy Leader under Michael Daley. After Daley's resignation in the aftermath of the March 2019 state election, Sharpe became interim Leader, serving until the June leadership election, which she did not contest. She was succeeded as leader by Jodi McKay and as deputy leader by Yasmin Catley.

Sharpe was briefly absent from the Legislative Council in 2015 when she resigned to contest the Legislative Assembly seat of Newtown at the 2015 state election. Newtown was a new seat partially replacing Carmel Tebbutt's abolished seat of Marrickville, which had been left open by Tebbutt's retirement. Sharpe was defeated in Newtown by Greens candidate Jenny Leong, and was subsequently re-appointed to the Legislative Council to fill her own vacancy.

Sharpe, a mother of three, was the first open lesbian to serve in the New South Wales parliament. Sharpe is aligned with the Labor Left faction.

== Early life ==
Sharpe was born in Canberra. She attended Melrose High School. At the age of 19, she moved to Sydney and studied food technology at the University of New South Wales, where she became involved in student politics. She was elected president of the University of New South Wales Student Guild in 1993, the same year that she met her long-term partner, Jo Tilly. Sharpe rose to national prominence the following year when she became president of the National Union of Students. As president, she was involved in a national campaign against the Keating Labor government's higher education reforms, as well as in the partially successful Victorian battle against attempts by its Liberal government to introduce voluntary student unionism there.

Sharpe was a co-editor of Party Girls: Labor Women, a book about the role of women in politics. She was a Marrickville Council councillor from 2004 to 2008. At the March 2004 local government elections, Sharpe was elected as a Councillor for West Ward of Marrickville Council, serving a single term until September 2008.

== Political career ==
=== Member of the Legislative Council (2005–2015) ===
Sharpe's official appointment to the Legislative Council was announced in late September 2005, which immediately caused substantial media attention due to her status as a lesbian mother—particularly as she would now be sitting alongside the likes of conservative Liberal David Clarke and Christian Democratic Party firebrand Fred Nile. She largely refused to comment on her private life in the subsequent fracas, but announced her policy goals as improving access to education and eliminating discrimination against gay parents. She has also made clear her intention to confront Clarke and Nile on gay rights issues; a stance that was heavily reflected in her maiden speech to parliament.

=== 2015 state election ===
In March 2015, Sharpe resigned from the Legislative Council to contest the lower house seat of Newtown at the 2015 state election. She was unsuccessful, with Jenny Leong of the Greens winning the seat, and subsequently announced her intention to contest preselection to be re-appointed to the vacancy caused by her own resignation.

=== Member of the Legislative Council (2015–present) ===
After the resignation of NSW Labor leader Luke Foley over sexual assault allegations, and the election of Michael Daley as his successor, Sharpe was unanimously elected Deputy Leader of the party on 10 November 2018., despite being a member of the upper house and was not a candidate for the lower house in the 2019 election. As Deputy Opposition Leader, Sharpe was the alternative Deputy Premier and the Deputy Premier has conventionally been a member of the lower house. In addition to carrying out her duties as Deputy Leader, Sharpe campaigned strongly on environmental issues during the 2019 New South Wales state election. She talked of building on the environmental reforms of the Wran and Carr governments, claiming, when she launched Labor's environment policy manifesto, that "NSW doesn't have another four years to waste to take real action on climate change and to arrest the biodiversity crisis in the state".

After Labor's defeat in the election, Daley announced his resignation. Sharpe succeeded him as interim leader. The leadership vote was scheduled for after the 2019 federal election so as not to conflict with Labor's federal campaign. It was ultimately held in June, with Jodi McKay defeating Chris Minns to win the leadership. Sharpe was set to recontest the deputy leadership, challenged by McKay's ally Yasmin Catley, but agreed to step aside and was appointed deputy leader in the Legislative Council. She was given the portfolios of Shadow Minister for Family & Community Services and Shadow Minister for Disability Inclusion in the McKay shadow cabinet.

On 8 June 2021, Sharpe became the leader of the opposition in the Legislative Council.

In May 2026, Sharpe was suspended from the Legislative Council on three occasions for contempt of parliament. Each suspension was on a party-line vote, with the third suspension for a period of one week. The contempt related to Sharpe's refusal to tender documents relating to sexual harassment allegations made against Jamie Clements, a former Labor state secretary and friend of Labor leader Chris Minns. The documents reportedly contained a police statement made by Minns, with Sharpe obtaining legal advice that they could not be publicly disclosed as they related to a police investigation. Shortly after Sharpe returned to Parliament, she was suspended again for 14 days.

== Political views and positions ==
Sharpe supported the introduction of same-sex marriage in Australia and has been credited with playing a key role in the campaign. She was a leading figure in the internal Labor Party push to shift the ALP's position to one of supporting same-sex marriage. As a member of the NSW Legislative Council, she moved motions and put state-based bills to the NSW Parliament. Sharpe was active in the "Yes" campaign during the Australian Marriage Law Postal Survey and subsequent parliamentary reform process, campaigning publicly and acting as a supporter and adviser to campaign director Tim Gartrell. ALP Senate leader Penny Wong's parliamentary speech on the Marriage Amendment (Definition and Religious Freedoms) Act 2017 stated that "change happened because of champions like Penny Sharpe, who has worked to build momentum for change in our party."

In 2018, Sharpe successfully led a cross-party process to amend the Public Health Act to legislate for 'safe-access zones', making the practice of harassing women entering clinics and hospitals providing terminations illegal. Some commentary noted that this was the first time a Bill introduced by a Labor MP had successfully passed the NSW Parliament since the ALP had lost government seven years earlier.

Sharpe resigned from her portfolios on 14 May 2021 over disagreements with the party's position on the Mandatory Disease Testing Bill. The bill would require blood testing of people who might have posed a risk of bodily fluid contact with frontline workers, such as first responders who have been spat on or scratched. According to Sharpe, the bill would represent "a major departure from a scientific and medical approach to managing the communicable risk of HIV or hepatitis". Sharpe abstained from voting before her resignation, which she claimed was not related to McKay's leadership. McKay would later be forced to resign as party leader two weeks later over the party's defeat at the Upper Hunter by-election.

Political offices
Preceded by James Griffin as Minister for Environment and Heritage	Minister for Environment, Climate Change and Heritage; 2023–present	Incumbent
Preceded by Matt Kean	Minister for Energy; 2023–present	Incumbent
Preceded by Damien Tudehope	Vice-President of the Executive Council; 2023–present	Incumbent
Preceded by Damien Tudehope	Leader of the Government in the Legislative Council; 2023–present	Incumbent
Preceded by Michael Daley	Deputy Leader of the Opposition of New South Wales; 2018–2019	Succeeded by Yasmin Catley
Preceded by Walt Secord	Deputy Leader of the Opposition in the Legislative Council; 2019–2021	Succeeded by John Graham
Preceded by Adam Searle	Leader of the Opposition in the Legislative Council; 2021–2023	Succeeded by Damien Tudehope
Party political offices
Preceded by Michael Daley	Deputy Leader of the NSW Labor Party; 2018–2019	Succeeded by Yasmin Catley
