= Gayley =

Gayley is a surname. Notable people with the surname include:

- Charles Mills Gayley (1858–1932), American English professor and academic administrator
- James Gayley (1855–1920), American chemist and steel metallurgist

== See also ==
- Dayley
- Hayley
