= Minister for Climate Change (New South Wales) =

Government minister in New South Wales, Australia

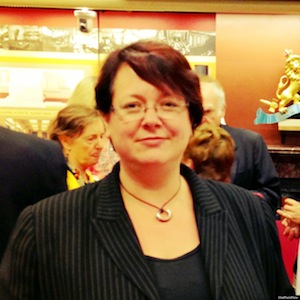
- Incumbent; Penny Sharpe since 28 March 2023
- Department of Climate Change, Energy, the Environment and Water
- Style: The Honourable
- Appointer: Governor of New South Wales
- Inaugural holder: Phil Koperberg (as Minister for Climate Change, Environment and Water)
- Formation: 2 April 2007

The Minister for Climate Change, is a minister in the Government of New South Wales who has responsibility for the management of climate change in New South Wales, Australia.

The portfolio was created following the 2007 election in the second Iemma ministry which was initially combined with the water and environment portfolios. Phil Koperberg was appointed the inaugural minister and before resigning from the cabinet in February 2008. Verity Firth was appointed as the minister for climate change and the environment, with Nathan Rees taking on the water portfolio. Carmel Tebbutt and John Robertson served as the minister in the Rees ministry, followed by Frank Sartor under Keneally. There was no climate changes ministers during the NSW Liberal Government of 2011 to 2023. With the return of Labor to power at the 2023 election, the portfolio was restored. The current minister, since 28 March 2023, is Penny Sharpe serving in Premier Minns ministry. The minister administrates the portfolio through the Department of Climate Change, Energy, the Environment and Water and a range of other government agencies.

Under Schedule 1 of the Administrative Arrangements (Minns Ministry—Administration of Acts) Order 2023, the current minister for climate change is solely responsible for the administration of the Climate Change (Net Zero Future) Act 2023 and has joint administration of all acts allocated to the minister for energy and to the minister for the environment.

Ultimately, the ministers are responsible to the Parliament of New South Wales.

== List of ministers ==
The following individuals have served as the Minister for Climate Change or any precedent titles:

Ministers for Climate Change
Ministerial title	Minister	Party	Ministry	Term start	Term end	Time in office	Notes
Minister for Climate Change, Environment and Water	Phil Koperberg	Labor	Iemma (2)	2 April 2007	27 February 2008	331 days	
Minister for Climate Change and the Environment	Verity Firth	Labor	Iemma (2)	27 February 2008	5 September 2008	191 days	
Minister for Climate Change and the Environment	Carmel Tebbutt	Labor	Rees	8 September 2008	14 September 2009	1 year, 6 days	
Minister for Climate Change and the Environment	John Robertson	Labor	Rees	14 September 2009	4 December 2009	81 days	
Minister for Climate Change and the Environment	Frank Sartor	Labor	Keneally	8 December 2009	28 March 2011	1 year, 110 days	
Minister for Climate Change	Penny Sharpe	Labor	Minns	28 March 2023	incumbent	3 years, 239 days	

== See also ==
- List of New South Wales government agencies
