= Nightly =

Nightly may refer to:

- An event which occurs once every night
- A nightly build of any software
- The Nightly Show with Larry Wilmore, a late-night panel talk show hosted by Larry Wilmore on Comedy Central
- Nightly (band), an alternative pop band from Nashville, Tennessee
- The Nightly, an Australian digital newspaper

== See also ==
- Daily (disambiguation)
