= Daisley =

Daisley is a surname. Notable people with the surname include:

- Bob Daisley (born 1950), Australian musician and songwriter
- Paul Daisley (1957–2003), British politician
- Stephen Daisley (born 1955), New Zealand novelist

== See also ==
- Dailey
- Paisley (name)
