= Frank Sartor =

Australian politician (born 1951)

The Honourable Frank Sartor AO
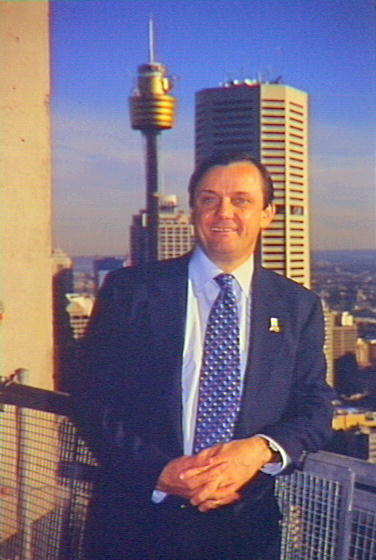
- Sartor in 2000

Minister for Climate Change and the Environment
- In office 8 December 2009 – 28 March 2011
- Premier: Kristina Keneally
- Preceded by: John Robertson
- Succeeded by: Robyn Parker (Note: As Minister for the Environment)

Minister Assisting the Minister for Health (Cancer)
- In office 8 December 2009 – 28 March 2011
- Premier: Kristina Keneally
- Preceded by: Jodi McKay
- In office 2 April 2003 – 2 April 2007
- Premier: Bob Carr; Morris Iemma
- Succeeded by: Verity Firth

Minister for Planning
- In office 3 August 2005 – 5 September 2008
- Premier: Morris Iemma
- Preceded by: Craig Knowles (Note: As Minister for Infrastructure and Planning)
- Succeeded by: Kristina Keneally

Minister for the Arts
- In office 2 April 2007 – 5 September 2008
- Premier: Morris Iemma
- Preceded by: Bob Debus
- Succeeded by: Nathan Rees

Minister for Redfern Waterloo
- In office 3 August 2005 – 5 September 2008
- Premier: Morris Iemma
- Succeeded by: Kristina Keneally

Minister for Science and Medical Research
- In office 2 April 2003 – 2 April 2007
- Premier: Bob Carr
- Preceded by: Kim Yeadon (Note: As Minister for Information Technology)
- Succeeded by: Verity Firth

Minister for Energy and Utilities
- In office 2 April 2003 – 3 August 2005
- Premier: Bob Carr
- Preceded by: Kim Yeadon (Note: As Minister for Energy)
- Succeeded by: Joe Tripodi (Note: As Minister for Energy)

Minister Assisting the Premier on the Arts
- In office 2 April 2003 – 3 August 2005
- Premier: Bob Carr
- Preceded by: Bob Debus
- Succeeded by: Virginia Judge

80th Lord Mayor of Sydney
- In office September 1991 – April 2003
- Deputy: Lucy Turnbull
- Preceded by: Jeremy Bingham
- Succeeded by: Lucy Turnbull

Member of the New South Wales Parliament for Rockdale
- In office 22 March 2003 – 26 March 2011
- Preceded by: George Thompson
- Succeeded by: John Flowers

Personal details
- Born: Francesco Ernest Sartor; 9 November 1951 (age 75) Yenda, New South Wales, Australia
- Party: Labor (since 2003)
- Other political affiliations: Living City Independents (1994–2003)
- Children: 3

Francesco Ernest Sartor AO (born 9 November 1951) is an Australian former politician who served as New South Wales Minister for Climate Change and the Environment and Minister Assisting the Minister for Health (Cancer) between 2009 and 2011. He was a Member of the New South Wales Legislative Assembly representing Rockdale for the Labor Party between 2003 and 2011. Sartor has previously been Minister for Planning, Redfern Waterloo and the Arts, and Minister for Water and Utilities in the Iemma and Carr governments. Before being elected to the New South Wales Parliament, Sartor was the second longest-serving Lord Mayor of Sydney, after Clover Moore, having held the post for nearly 12 years from September 1991 to March 2003. Sartor retired from politics at the 2011 state election.

== Early life ==
Sartor was born in Yenda near Griffith, New South Wales. His migrant parents named him Francesco Ernest Sartor, but he decided life would be easier if he called himself Frank. He attended St Therese's (Catholic) Primary School, Yenda, followed by Griffith High School. His mother died of melanoma when Sartor was 16.

He attended the University of Sydney, residing at St John's College and graduating with a degree in chemical engineering, and a later qualification in accounting. From 1976–83, he was employed as a chemical engineer and in management roles by Colgate-Palmolive and oil company Total Australia Ltd.

== Local government ==
Sartor served on the Council of the City of Sydney from 1984 to 2003, and was Lord Mayor of Sydney for almost 12 years, from September 1991 to April 2003. During his time on the council he served as vice-president of the Sydney Organising Committee for the Olympic Games, Chairman of the Sydney Festival, Chairman of the Central Sydney Planning Committee, and board member of the Sydney Harbour Foreshore Authority.

During his tenure as Lord Mayor, unfounded claims were made in an effort to discredit Sartor, in relation to alleged sexual harassment, by Liberal politician, John Hannaford. These accusations were unfounded and never supported with any evidence, and were never raised in a court of law nor raised by Hannaford outside the protection of parliamentary privilege. Hannaford subsequently failed to provide any evidence to support his allegations, and was in turn investigated by the NSW Parliament for abuse of parliamentary privilege.

Upon the departure of Sartor as Mayor, he was succeeded by Deputy Mayor, Lucy Turnbull, who served the remainder of the term between 2003 and 2004. Turnbull did not seek election by popular vote.

== New South Wales politics ==
Sartor first sought to enter state politics in 1988, when he contested the inner-city Electoral district of McKell as an Independent, running against the endorsed Labor candidate, Sandra Nori. Sartor came second, winning 23.5% of the primary vote and 43.4% of the two-candidate preferred vote In 2003, Sartor joined the NSW Labor Party and entered parliament after successfully contesting the safe Labor seat of Rockdale at the 2003 state election and was subsequently sworn in as Minister for Energy and Water Utilities, Minister Assisting the Minister for Health (Cancer) and Minister for Science and Medical Research.

=== Anti-cancer reforms ===
As Assistant Health Minister, Sartor was responsible for the formation of the Cancer Institute NSW in 2003 and the introduction of smoking bans in NSW pubs and clubs in 2004, reforms he would later describe as among his proudest achievements. Many of these achievements were driven by personal tragedy and loss of his former partner, Hephzibah Tintner, and his mother, to cancer. In his final speech to parliament, Sartor broke down when talking about their loss, and how it influenced his political career. In his time as a Minister in all of his various portfolios, Sartor became known for his blunt and often crude language, but also his drive to improve cancer survival rates. However his smoking bans drew vehement criticism from publicans who argued they would harm profitability, and from anti-cancer groups which said they did not go far enough. In announcing his resignation, NSW Premier Kristina Keneally paid tribute to Sartor's work as Australia's first cancer minister. As Minister Assisting the Minister for Health (Cancer) he oversaw restrictions on the retailing of cigarettes in NSW, including forcing them to be kept under the counter.

=== Redfern Waterloo ===
In 2005 Premier Bob Carr appointed Sartor as the first Minister for Redfern Waterloo overseeing the Redfern-Waterloo Authority and exercising planning powers over an area of inner Sydney. In this role he invoked the ire of the Redfern indigenous population with his rejection of a plan by the Aboriginal Housing Company to redevelop "The Block" and for suggesting on Koori Radio that the company's chairman, Mick Mundine should "Get off your backside ... and bring your black arse in here to talk about it." Sartor later apologised for this remark. The creation of the Redfern Waterloo portfolio was greeted with some cynicism given the long history of similar attempts to rejuvenate the area. Despite this, the Authority was able to deliver urban renewal projects for a number of derelict sites including the former Redfern Public School and a substantial redevelopment of the Australian Technology Park to incorporate headquarters for the Sydney television station Channel Seven. As part of Sartor's broader reforms in the area, the Australian Technology Park was established, and due to the reforms established by Sartor, the NSW Government is able to continue active investigations into better use of disused land in the inner-west, such as the former Eveleigh railway workshops and disused industrial land.

=== Minister for Planning ===
Upon the appointment of Morris Iemma as Premier in late 2005, Sartor relinquished the Energy and Water portfolios and was sworn in as Minister for Planning. His administration was marked by a series of planning reforms to reduce the concurrence and consultation processes required for major developments in NSW. In a column in The Sydney Morning Herald, journalist and former City of Sydney Councillor Elizabeth Farrelly was scathing of Sartor for his support for advertising billboards along NSW roadways, his approval of the Anvil Hill Coal Mine, and for his moves to reduce the planning powers of local government.

Sartor was re-elected as Member for Rockdale at the 2007 state election with a slightly reduced majority, and was sworn in as Minister for Planning, Minister for Redfern Waterloo and Minister for the Arts.

In 2008, the NSW Greens demanded a Royal Commission into alleged links between Sartor's planning approvals and Labor Party donations by major developers. Sartor denied his planning decisions had been influenced by developer donations and threatened legal action against media outlets which repeated the claims. In 2009, Sartor was damaged by a Land and Environment Court judgment that described a decision he made to allow development at Catherine Hill Bay by a political donor, Rose Group, in exchange for conservation land as being influenced by a "land bribe". On announcing his resignation, Sartor described his time as planning minister as the most difficult of his career.

On 7 September 2008, Sartor was defeated in a ballot for ministerial positions and returned to the backbench with reports of internal polling by Labor revealing that Sartor was one of the government's most unpopular ministers.

=== Minister for Climate Change and the Environment ===
In December 2009, a no confidence motion was passed; and Nathan Rees stood down as Leader of NSW Labor. Sartor contested a Labor right faction ballot and narrowly lost the ballot to Kristina Keneally, who was then made Premier. Keneally returned Sartor to the NSW Cabinet; appointed to the role of Minister for Climate Change and the Environment. He was also returned to his old role of Minister Assisting the Minister for Health (Cancer), an area of personal interest and commitment.

== Adoption of children legislation ==
In September 2010, Sartor introduced an amendment to the adoption legislation that would exempt both religious organisations and institutions from the legislation and that the Anti-Discrimination Act 1977 would not apply to the legislation — and would allow same-sex couples to adopt children.

== Personal life ==
The dancer Hephzibah Tintner was his partner until her death from cancer in 2001. She was the daughter of the Austrian-born orchestral conductor Georg Tintner.

He is now married to Monique Sartor, an interior decorator and lives in Glebe a suburb of Sydney.

== Notes ==
Civic offices
Preceded by Jeremy Bingham	Lord Mayor of Sydney; 1991 – 2003	Succeeded by Lucy Turnbull
Political offices
Preceded by John Robertson	Minister for Climate Change and the Environment; 2009-2011	Succeeded by Robyn Parker
New South Wales Legislative Assembly
Preceded by George Thompson	Member for Rockdale; 2003–2011	Succeeded by John Flowers
