= John Hatzistergos =

Australian politician (born 1960)

His Honour the Honourable Judge John Hatzistergos AM

Judge of the District Court of New South Wales
- Incumbent
- Assumed office 16 October 2014

Chief Commissioner of the Independent Commission Against Corruption
- Incumbent
- Assumed office 7 August 2022
- Preceded by: Peter Hall QC

Member of the New South Wales Legislative Council
- In office 27 March 1999 – 19 May 2011
- Preceded by: Jim Kaldis
- Succeeded by: Adam Searle
Previous ministerial offices
Minister for Justice
In office 2 April 2003 – 10 August 2005
Preceded by	Bob Debus as Minister for Corrective Services
Succeeded by	Tony Kelly
In office 2 April 2007 – 4 December 2009
Preceded by	Tony Kelly
Succeeded by	Phil Costa as Minister for Corrective Services; Graham West as Minister for Juvenile Justice
Minister for Fair Trading
In office 1 February 2005 – 10 August 2005
Preceded by	Reba Meagher
Succeeded by	Diane Beamer
Minister for Health
In office 10 August 2005 – 2 April 2007
Preceded by	Morris Iemma
Succeeded by	Reba Meagher
Attorney General
In office 2 April 2007 – 28 March 2011
Preceded by	Bob Debus
Succeeded by	Greg Smith
Minister for Industrial Relations
In office 11 September 2008 – 4 December 2009
Preceded by	John Della Bosca
Succeeded by	John Robertson
Minister for Regulatory Reform
In office 8 December 2009 – 28 March 2011
Preceded by	Joe Tripodi
Succeeded by	Greg Pearce
Minister for Citizenship
In office 8 December 2009 – 28 March 2011
Preceded by	Virginia Judge
Succeeded by	Victor Dominello as Minister for Citizenship and Communities
Vice President of the Executive Council
In office 1 September 2009 – 28 March 2011
Preceded by	Tony Kelly
Succeeded by	Michael Gallacher

Personal details
- Born: 20 August 1960 (age 66) Redfern, New South Wales, Australia
- Party: Labor Party
- Spouse: Maria
- Children: 3
- Occupation: Judge

John Hatzistergos AM (born 20 August 1960) is an Australian jurist and former politician who has served as a judge of the District Court of New South Wales since 16 October 2014 and Chief Commissioner of the New South Wales Independent Commission Against Corruption (ICAC) since 7 August 2022. He was previously a member of the New South Wales Legislative Council representing the Labor Party between 1999 and 2011, and a minister in various Labor governments.

== Early life and education ==
Born in Redfern, Sydney, the son of two Greek immigrants, Hatzistergos was educated at Bourke Street Primary School in Surry Hills and Cleveland Street Boys' High School.

Hatzistergos studied economics and law at the University of Sydney, where he was later appointed to the Senate of the university.

== Career ==
=== Legal career ===
Hatzistergos was a solicitor in private practice between 1983 and 1987. He spent the next two years as a Senior Legal Officer with the Commonwealth Director of Public Prosecutions and a barrister in private practice since 1989.

=== Political career ===
Hatzistergos joined the East Redfern branch of the ALP in 1976, was secretary of the Campsie branch from 1983 to 1990 and later the Belmore branch from 1993 to 2000. First elected to the New South Wales Legislative Council in 1999 while serving as Deputy Mayor of Canterbury City Council. Hatzistergos served as the NSW Minister for Health, between 2005 and 2007 and again briefly for 14 days in 2009, Minister for Fair Trading (2005) and Minister for Justice, between 2003 and 2005 and again between 2007 and 2009. Hatzistergos served as Attorney General from 2007 until 2011, and Minister for Industrial Relations between 2008 and 2009. He was Minister for Citizenship, Minister for Regulatory Reform, Vice President of the Executive Council and Government Leader in the Legislative Council.

He implemented major reforms to freedom of information and privacy through new legislation and the establishment of the Information and Privacy Commission. Other achievements include the establishment of the Australian International Disputes Centre in Sydney and Uniform Domestic Arbitration Laws, Intensive Correction Orders and Forum Sentencing. He also implemented major reforms to the NSW Children's Court following the Wood Special Commission of Inquiry.

During his tenure, Hatzistergos was a nationally recognised opponent of a Bill of Rights. In late 2010 it was reported that he was being considered a possible candidate for appointment to the Supreme Court of New South Wales, and a potential successor to Chief Justice Reg Blanch of the District Court of New South Wales.

On 31 March 2011, Hatzistergos announced that he intended to retire from the Legislative Council despite having four years of his term to run. His announcement followed that of Eddie Obeid with Walt Secord and Adam Searle nominated by Labor to fill the casual vacancies.

=== Post-political career ===
In late 2011 Hatzistergos became an adjunct professor at the University of Technology Sydney, teaching constitutional law. In July 2014 Hatzistergos was asked by the NSW Government to assist in the review the NSW Bail laws in response to controversy over a number of decisions made by magistrates. Hatzistergos recommended a number of changes to recalibrate the manner in which NSW courts would assess the risk posed by people charged with serious offenses. His recommendations were accepted by the NSW Government. On 10 October 2014 NSW Attorney General Brad Hazzard announced Hatzistergos's appointment as a judge of the District Court of New South Wales. He was appointed Chief Commissioner of the New South Wales Independent Commission Against Corruption (ICAC) on 7 August 2022.

Political offices
Preceded by Bob Debus as Minister for Corrective Services	Minister for Justice; 2003–2005	Succeeded by Tony Kelly
Preceded by Reba Meagher	Minister for Fair Trading; 2005	Succeeded by Diane Beamer
Preceded by Morris Iemma	Minister for Health; 2005–2007	Succeeded by Reba Meagher
Preceded by Tony Kelly	Minister for Justice; 2007–2009	Succeeded by Phil Costa as Minister for Corrective Services; Graham West as Minister for Juvenile Justice
Preceded by Bob Debus	Attorney General of New South Wales; 2007–2011	Succeeded by Greg Smith
Preceded by John Della Bosca	Minister for Industrial Relations; 2008–2009	Succeeded by John Robertson
Preceded by Joe Tripodi	Minister for Regulatory Reform; 2009–2011	Succeeded by Greg Pearce as Minister for Finance and Services
Preceded by Virginia Judge	Minister for Citizenship; 2009–2011	Succeeded by Victor Dominello as Minister for Citizenship and Communities
Preceded by Tony Kelly	Vice President of the Executive Council; 2009–2011	Succeeded by Michael Gallacher
