= Daleyville =

Daleyville may refer to:

- Daleyville, Ohio, United States
- Daleyville, Wisconsin, United States

== See also ==
- Daley (disambiguation)
