= Dayley =

Dayley is a surname. Notable people with the surname include:

- Ken Dayley (born 1959), American baseball player
- K. Newell Dayley (born 1939), American composer, hymnwriter, and musician
- Thomas Dayley (born 1944), American politician

== See also ==
- Dailey, surname
- Daley, given name and surname
