= Dailey =

Dailey is a surname of Irish origin. Notable people with the surname include:

== Entertainment ==
- Dan Dailey (1915–1978), American actor and dancer
- Irene Dailey (1920–2008), American actress
- Peter F. Dailey (1868–1908), American burlesque comedian
- Will Dailey (born c.1976), American recording and performing artist

== Sports ==
- Bill Dailey (1935–2025), American professional baseball player
- Bob Dailey (1953–2016), Canadian ice hockey player
- Casey Dailey (born 1975), American football player
- Corey Dailey (born 2007), American football player
- Doug Dailey (born 1944), English cyclist
- Eric Dailey Jr. (born 2004), American basketball player
- Mary Dailey (1928–1965), All-American League Professional Baseball League player
- Quintin Dailey (1961–2010), American professional basketball player
- Ted Dailey (1908–1992), American football player

== Others ==
- Charlotte F. Dailey (1842–1914), American editor and exposition official
- Dan Dailey (glass artist) (born 1947), American glass artist
- Dell L. Dailey, United States Department of State counterterrorism officer
- Don Dailey (1956–2013), American computer chess researcher and game programmer
- Fred Dailey (born 1946), American farmer
- Janet Dailey (1944–2013), American author
- John R. Dailey (born 1934), United States Marine Corps general
- Joseph S. Dailey (1844–1905), Justice of the Indiana Supreme Court
- Mark Dailey (1953–2010), American-born Canadian television journalist
- Olive Dailey Pierson (died 1969), American politician from Connecticut
- Peter H. Dailey (1930–2018), American advertising executive and U.S. Ambassador to Ireland (1982–1984)
- Phyllis Mae Dailey (1919–1976), American nurse and Navy officer
- Ulysses Grant Dailey (1885–1961), American surgeon, writer and teacher

== See also ==
- Daily (disambiguation)
- Daley, given name and surname
- Daly (disambiguation)
- Dayley, surname
