= George W. Daley =

American newspaper editor

George William Daley
- Born: September 14, 1875; Clinton Heights, Rensselaer County, New York, U.S.
- Died: August 12, 1952 (aged 76); Rensselaer, New York, U.S.
- Other name: "Monitor" (pseudonym)
- Occupations: Journalist, sports columnist, editor, writer

George William Daley (September 14, 1875 – August 12, 1952) was an American newspaper editor, sports writer, and syndicated author of fictional baseball stories and poetry. He often used the pseudonym "Monitor". He was a copy editor in the sports department at The New York Times from 1931 to 1952.

== Early life and education ==
Daley was born in Clinton Heights, Rensselaer County, New York and married Marion Rhines while a student at Union College in Schenectady, New York. They had a daughter, Marjorie May, and settled in West Brighton, New York. His cousin George Herbert Daley was also a newspaper sports writer and editor.

== Career ==
Daley launched his newspaper career on Staten Island, initially at the Staten Islander and as the Staten Island correspondent for the New York World, 1895–1899, and later, at the Brooklyn Eagle and the New York Sun. From 1900 to 1905 created the popular Home Run Haggerty and Strike Out Sawyer fictional characters and launched his syndicated baseball stories.

Daley joined the New York Herald as a telegraph editor in 1905 and rose through the ranks as night city editor, night editor, news editor and, ultimately, managing editor. His failing health required a career change, so he rejoined the staff of the New York World as a sports writer. He chronicled the play-by-play and results of sporting contests in golf, cycling, collegiate football, yachting, tennis, boxing, horse-racing, baseball.

While at the World, his "Monitor" by-line headed regular weekly columns including Over the Plate and Sport Talk and he became a recognized authority on baseball, heading the New York chapter of the Baseball Writers' Association of America.

When the World closed its doors in 1931, Mr. Daley went to work for The New York Times as a copy editor in the sports department until his death in 1952, at the age of 76, at his sister's house in Rensselaer.
