= 2018 New South Wales Labor Party leadership election =

Australian state political party election

2018 Australian Labor Party (New South Wales Branch) leadership election
- 10 November 2018
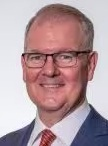

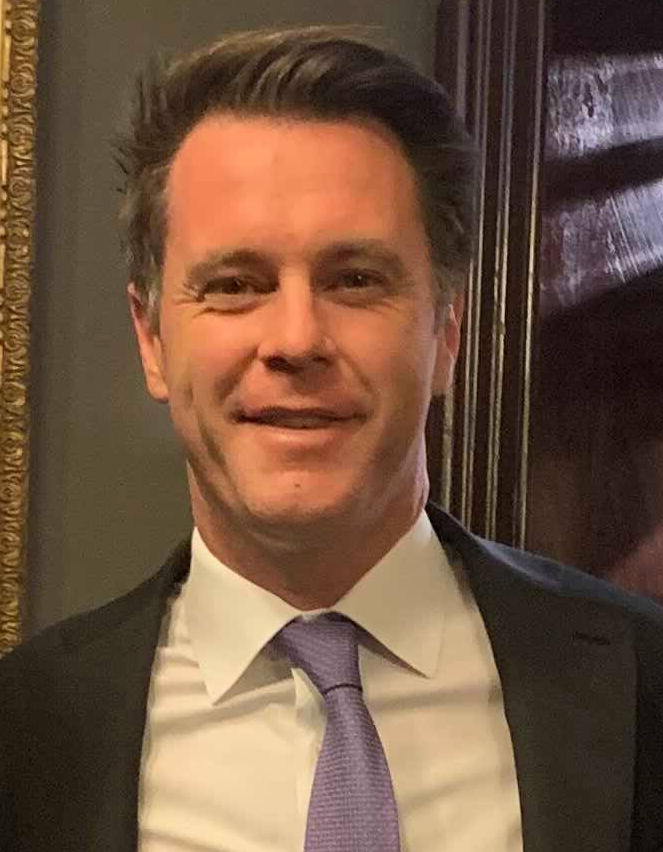
Candidate	Michael Daley	Chris Minns
Votes	33	12
%	73.33%	26.66%
Seat	Maroubra	Kogarah
Leader before election
Luke Foley
Elected Leader
Michael Daley

An election for the leadership of the New South Wales branch of the Australian Labor Party, the party of opposition in the New South Wales, was held on 10 November 2018. The election was triggered following the resignation of Opposition Leader Luke Foley on 8 November 2018.

Foley's deputy Michael Daley who became acting leader upon Foley's resignation was formalised into the leadership when he won the caucus vote beating Shadow Water Minister Chris Minns, 33 votes to 12.

== Background ==
Following the defeat of Labor in the 2015 election, then leader Luke Foley remained as head of the party and opposition despite being in the position for a little more than three months. In October 2018, allegations were raised by NSW Corrections Minister David Elliott about an incident Foley had "a little bit too much to drink at a party and harassed an ABC journalist." Later that month, ABC journalist Ashleigh Raper released a statement, alleging that at an event in November 2016, Foley "placed his hand down the back of her dress and inside her underpants." Hours later, Foley read a statement in which he resigned as leader of the Labor Party, but denied the allegation and said he would commence defamation proceedings in the Federal Court. As a result, the position of Labor leader and head of the opposition was vacated, three years after the election of Foley as leader.

On 9 November, acting leader Michael Daley announced that he will contest the position and was widely tipped to succeed Foley and become New South Wales' 38th Leader of the Opposition. Later in the afternoon, Shadow Minister for Water Chris Minns announced that he intended to contest Daley for the leadership role.

The leadship election came four months before the March 2019 election. It marked the second time in a row that the party had to elect a new leader just months out from an election. On the previous occasion, John Robertson resigned in December 2014, three months before the March 2015 election and Foley was elected as his permanent replacement.

== Candidates ==
- Michael Daley, Acting Leader of the Opposition, Shadow Minister for Planning and Infrastructure and Shadow Minister for Gaming and Racing
- Chris Minns, Shadow Minister for Water

=== Declined ===
- Ryan Park, Shadow Treasurer
- Jodi McKay, Shadow Minister for Transport and Shadow Minister for Roads, Maritime and Freight

== See also ==
- 2015 New South Wales state election
- 2019 New South Wales state election
- Australian Labor Party leadership spill, September 2013
- 2015 Australian Labor Party (New South Wales Branch) leadership election
- 2018 Liberal Party of Australia leadership spills
