= Clayton Daley =

Clayton C. Daley, Jr. (born November 6, 1951, in Canton, Ohio) retired as the vice chairman and chief financial officer of The Procter & Gamble Company effective September 16, 2009, after 35 years of service. He stepped down as CFO on January 1, 2009. He started with the company in 1974. He was named CFO in 1998. He attended Davidson College where he graduated with a bachelor's degree in economics in 1973, and he received a Master of Business Administration degree from Ohio State University in 1974.
