= Chris Minns =

Premier of New South Wales since 2023

The Honourable Chris Minns MP
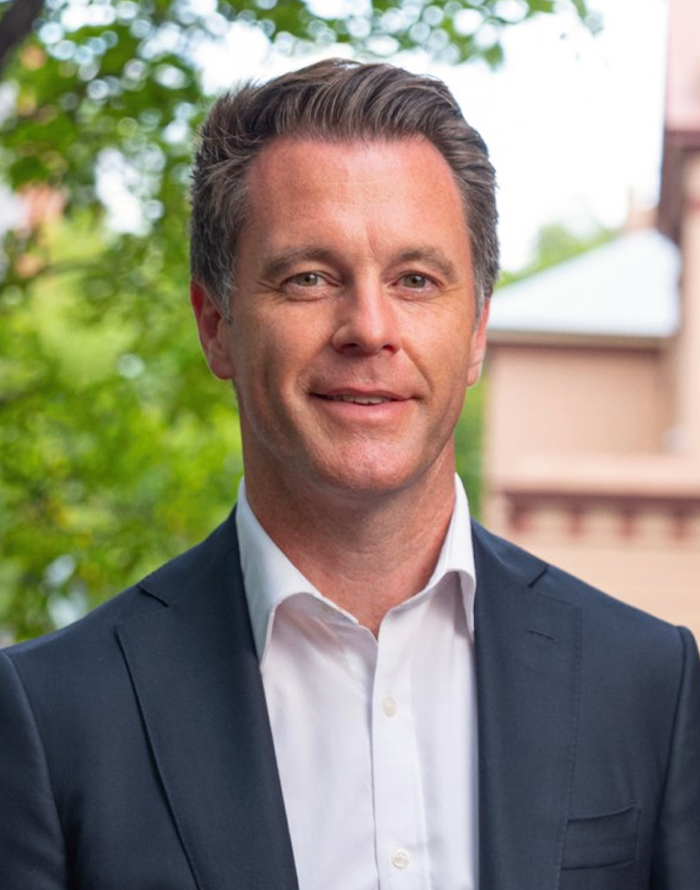
- Official portrait, c. 2023

47th Premier of New South Wales
- Incumbent
- Assumed office 28 March 2023
- Monarch: Charles III
- Governor: Margaret Beazley
- Deputy: Prue Car
- Preceded by: Dominic Perrottet

Leader of the Opposition in New South Wales
- In office 4 June 2021 – 28 March 2023
- Premier: Gladys Berejiklian; Dominic Perrottet
- Deputy: Prue Car
- Preceded by: Jodi McKay
- Succeeded by: Mark Speakman

Leader of the New South Wales Labor Party
- Incumbent
- Assumed office 4 June 2021
- Deputy: Prue Car
- Preceded by: Jodi McKay
Shadow ministerial offices
Shadow Minister for Corrections
In office 3 July 2019 – 26 May 2021
Leader	Jodi McKay
Preceded by	Guy Zangari
Succeeded by	Tara Moriarty
Shadow Minister for Transport
In office 3 July 2019 – 26 May 2021
Leader	Jodi McKay
Preceded by	Jodi McKay
Succeeded by	Jo Haylen
Shadow Minister for Water
In office 10 March 2016 – 3 July 2019
Leader	Luke Foley; Michael Daley; Penny Sharpe (interim)
Preceded by	Mick Veitch
Succeeded by	Clayton Barr

Member of the New South Wales Parliament for Kogarah
- Incumbent
- Assumed office 28 March 2015
- Preceded by: Cherie Burton
Local offices
Deputy Mayor of Hurstville
In office 12 September 2007 – 13 September 2008
Mayor	Vince Badalati
Preceded by	Sandy Grekas
Succeeded by	Philip Sansom
Councillor of the Hurstville City Council
In office 24 March 2004 – 13 September 2008
Ward	Penshurst

Personal details
- Born: Christopher John Minns; 17 September 1979 (age 47) St George, New South Wales, Australia
- Party: Labor
- Spouse: Anna Minns (m. 2005)
- Children: 3
- Education: Marist College Kogarah
- Alma mater: University of New England; Princeton University
- Cabinet: Minns ministry Minns shadow ministry
- Website: Government website Personal website Party website

Christopher John Minns (born 17 September 1979) is an Australian politician who has served as the 47th premier of New South Wales since 2023 and the leader of the New South Wales Labor Party since 2021. He has been the member of parliament (MP) for Kogarah since 2015.

Prior to state politics, Minns served as the deputy mayor of Hurstville from 2007 to 2008. He was first elected to the Legislative Assembly at the 2015 election, and was elected unopposed as leader of the Labor Party in the leadership election of June 2021, following the resignation of Jodi McKay. He led the party to victory at the 2023 election.

Since becoming leader of the New South Wales Labor Party, Minns has come under scrutiny from political opponents and members of his own party for claims of increased authoritarianism. Under Minns' leadership, his Labor party supported anti-protest laws introduced by the Perrottet Liberal government and continued to seek anti-protest laws as Premier. Courts have found statutes passed by his government to be unconstitutional and elsewhere overturned executive actions. During his Premiership, Minns reversed privatisation in New South Wales, implemented environmental policies such as the Great Koala National Park, increased wages for teachers, nurses and essential workers and improved rental laws for tenants.

== Early and personal life ==
Christopher John Minns was born on 17 September 1979 in St George, Sydney, the second of three children born to John Gerard Minns (1952–2024) and Cara Minns. He was raised in Penshurst, and attended Marist College Kogarah, an independent Catholic secondary school in Bexley, a suburb of St George.

Minns attended the University of New England in Armidale, where he graduated with a Bachelor of Arts. In 2012, he enrolled at Princeton University in New Jersey, United States, where he graduated with a Master of Public Policy in 2013.

Minns is married and has three sons with his wife Anna. Upon his return from Princeton, while his wife pursued her own business opportunities Minns became the carer of his sons before nominating for parliament.

Minns is a supporter of NRL club the Canterbury-Bankstown Bulldogs.

Minns' father, John, died on 1 May 2024 after suffering a heart attack. In Minns' inaugural speech, he spoke about his love for his father, and thanked him for bringing Minns into the "Labor tribe".

Minns has a brother named Jim who is a lawyer for the PSA.

== Political career ==
Minns was first elected to office in 2004 as a Penshurst Ward councillor of the Hurstville City Council, and was elected for a term as deputy mayor in 2007–2008; he left council at the 2008 election after serving a single term. He also worked on the staff of Carl Scully and John Robertson.

Following Luke Foley's resignation as NSW Labor leader and leader of the NSW opposition, Minns nominated for the roles. On 10 November 2018, Minns lost the leadership spill to Michael Daley, 33 votes to 12. After the 2019 state election Minns lost the leadership election to Jodi McKay on a combined caucus and party membership vote of 60.5% to 39.5%. He was appointed to the portfolios of transport and corrections in the shadow cabinet.

=== 2021 leadership challenge ===
Following Labor's defeat at the Upper Hunter by-election in May 2021 and a possible leadership challenge to McKay, a file titled Why Chris Minns and Jamie Clements can never run the NSW Labor Party was circulated from the office of deputy Labor leader Yasmin Catley. Minns was disappointed with the lack of explanation or communication from McKay and Catley over the file circulation, and resigned from shadow cabinet on 26 May. He was the second MP to resign from shadow cabinet in two days after shadow treasurer Walt Secord, a close supporter of Minns. On 31 May 2021, after McKay resigned as party leader, Minns announced he would run for party leadership. If Michael Daley and Minns had contested for party leadership, it would have been Minns's third leadership contest and his second one versus Daley. Minns’s leadership bid was publicly supported by more than a dozen senior Labor MPs including Penny Sharpe, Ryan Park, Jihad Dib, and Prue Car. On 4 June 2021, Daley pulled out of the leadership contest, allowing Minns to be elected to the position of leader unopposed.

=== Opposition leader ===
In the 2023 NSW election campaign, Minns made election promises to invest further into public services. He had been criticised for being reluctant to promise reform on money laundering in gambling, however on 16 January Minns released a plan to reform gambling, which would ban donations from clubs (gambling organisations) to political parties and promises a cashless gaming card trial, which would last for 12 months and cover 500 of the approximately 86,480 (0.58%) pokies machines (slots).

==== 2023 election ====
Minns led the Labor Party to victory at the 2023 New South Wales state election on 25 March, defeating the incumbent Liberal–National Coalition, returning Labor to power at the state level for the first time since 2011. Despite winning the election, Labor came up two seats short of a majority. However, three of the nine independents—Alex Greenwich, Greg Piper and Joe McGirr—agreed to support a Labor minority government.

=== Premier of New South Wales (2023–present) ===
In 2024, Minns supported the federal Labor government's age verification system that would bar users under the age of 16 from using certain forms of social media.

Between May and July 2025, Minns's government amended tenancy legislation, first increasing protections for renters then partially rolling the changes back. In May, amendments to the Residential Tenancies Act 2010 came into force. Described by the government as "ending no grounds evictions", the most publicised of the changes was a provision requiring landlords to provide a compliant reason for evictions, along with a piece of supporting evidence. The Tenants' Union of NSW described the changes as "a significant improvement for NSW renters". Other changes included restricting the authority of landlords to restrict pets, prohibiting rent increases within one year of the previous increase, and prohibiting fees for background checks.

After five weeks, the evidence requirement was abolished by an amendment to the Residential Tenancies Regulation 2019, rendering it sufficient for landlords to merely submit a written statement. According to the Tenants' Union, the government "quietly removed key safeguards". Dr Chris Martin of the UNSW City Futures Research Centre characterised this as the introduction of a "renovictions" loophole.

In 2024, the government announced a 3% per annum pay rise for teachers in public schools over three years. The Minister for Industrial Relations said that it "reaffirms the Minns Labor Government’s new industrial relations framework is working".

The culling of brumbies (wild, introduced horses) in Kosciuszko National Park was implemented to reduce their numbers and protect native flora and fauna. A bill passed parliament on 27 November 2025 to repeal the Kosciuszko Wild Horse Heritage Act 2018.

In August 2025, Minns's government announced that they will complete Woollahra station in order to enable rezoning for additional housing development in the area. Opposition Leader and Liberal Party member Kellie Sloane opposed the upgrade of the station.

In September 2025, Minns's government signalled its intention to significantly amend the Environmental Planning and Assessment Act 1979, with the legislation now including the government's existing Housing Delivery Authority and a new Development Coordination Authority.

In October 2025, Minns announced that the government would take back control of Northern Beaches Hospital from Healthscope, its private operator, at a cost of $190 million. Controversy had arisen surrounding the hospital following the death of a two-year-old child at the hospital. Legislation has banned future public-private partnerships in the hospital system.

On 15 February 2026, the Minns government introduced a new public holiday to NSW, by granting a long-weekend when ANZAC Day falls on a Saturday or Sunday.

Minns has hinted that he intends to retire from politics, prior to the 2031 election. However, he has stated his plan to contest the 2027 state election as party leader.

In September 2026, the Minns government passed legislation to allow users of medical cannabis to drive, provided the amount of THC in their system is below a specified threshold. A separate piece of legislation, passed in the same month, improved privacy protections and consumer rights for renters.

=== Concerns over civil liberties ===
During Minns' role as Opposition Leader in 2022, his Labor party supported anti-protest laws introduced by the Perrottet Liberal government. Sections of these anti-protest measures were struck down in December 2023 by the NSW Supreme Court as unconstitutional, due to their impermissible burden on the implied freedom of political communication in the Commonwealth Constitution.

Once in government, Minns reportedly proposed in October 2024 that the NSW Police should be able to deny approvals for pro-Palestine protests, based on the cost of policing such events. This led to condemnation from fellow Labor MPs, such as Anthony D'Adam and Stephen Lawrence, with the former describing the idea as "a profound threat to our civil liberties to empower the police to be able to prohibit peaceful protest". D'Adam was also quoted to say that "my experience has been that the party is increasingly centralised and authoritarian in its disposition".

In early 2025, Minns passed a law which restricted protests near places of worship. The NSW Council for Civil Liberties and legal scholars criticised this action as authoritarian and undermining freedom of assembly. Opposition legislators, such as Sue Higginson of the Greens, raised concerns over democratic backsliding. On 19 June 2025, a legal challenge was brought before the Supreme Court of New South Wales against the legislation. The judge overseeing the case, Justice Anna Mitchelmore, ruled on 16 October 2025 that the law was unconstitutional, due to its impermissible burden on the implied freedom of political communication in the Commonwealth Constitution.

Concerns from opposition legislators about the circumstances surrounding the passage of the places of worship law (and other legislation from the same time-frame), have led to the establishment of a parliamentary inquiry. The criminalisation of inciting racial hatred was criticised by former Chief Justice Tom Bathurst, due to the offence introducing "imprecision and subjectivity" into the criminal law.

In the aftermath of the Bondi Beach shooting, Minns announced that the New South Wales Parliament would reconvene on 22 December to introduce new firearms laws and a ban on protests following a "terror designation". On 24 December, the NSW Parliament passed an omnibus bill, which tightened access to firearms and restricted mass protests following terrorism incidents. The bill passed despite some controversies, with the Shooters, Fishers and Farmers Party and the Nationals opposing the gun-law reforms. The Greens and some Labor members voiced concerns about alleged authoritarianism in the restrictions on freedom of assembly.

On 16 April 2026, the New South Wales Court of Appeal unanimously struck down the anti-protest laws, passed on 24 December 2025 as a response to the Bondi mass-shooting. The laws were ruled to be unconstitutional, as they were found to impermissibly burden the implied freedom of political communication.

In mid November 2026, Minns, Police Minister Yasmin Catley, Tourism Minister Steve Kamper and senior police officials, were served subpoenas to shed light on planning of the police operation.

== Political views ==
Minns is a member of Labor Right, and was assistant secretary of the NSW Labor Party. He has been described as a centrist.

In 2003, while adviser to minister for roads and housing Carl Scully, Minns attended the Australia Israel Jewish Affairs Council (AIJAC) inaugural Rambam trip to Israel. Attending alongside Minns were Scott Morrison, Bill Shorten and foreign policy adviser to federal opposition leader Simon Crean Carl Ungerer.

In his inaugural speech in the Legislative Assembly, Minns criticised the state government's sale of NSW's electricity assets and called for mandatory Mandarin Chinese lessons in New South Wales schools.

In 2019, Minns argued in favour for legalising cannabis during a party meeting but has since walked back this position since becoming premier.

Minns opposed legislation that would enable voluntary euthanasia.

=== Views on union influence in the Labor Party ===
Additionally, Minns called for a reduction in union influence in the Labor Party in favour of "increasing representation of ordinary members of our party who have more diverse voices", stating that while trade unions were integral to the success and heritage of the Labor Party, the party also needs to represent those who are not in a trade union, and that will mean taking steps to reduce union control on Labor's conference floor.

Bob Nanva, national secretary of the Rail, Tram and Bus Union, while acknowledging that Minns had been "an extraordinarily effective Assistant General Secretary of the ALP", rebuked him for being "seriously mistaken" on his views about unions. Additionally, both Mark Buttigieg and NSW Labor Party secretary Jamie Clements disagreed with Minns's contention regarding unions. By 2019, Minns reportedly no longer held those views, according to HSU NSW state secretary Gerard Hayes.

== See also ==
- Minns shadow ministry

Civic offices
Preceded by Sandy Grekas	Deputy Mayor of Hurstville; 2007–2008	Succeeded by Philip Sansom
New South Wales Legislative Assembly
Preceded by Cherie Burton	Member for Kogarah; 2015–present	Incumbent
Political offices
Preceded by Jodi McKay	Leader of the Opposition of New South Wales; 2021–2023	Succeeded by Mark Speakman
Preceded by Dominic Perrottet	Premier of New South Wales; 2023–present	Incumbent
Party political offices
Preceded by Jodi McKay	Leader of the Australian Labor Party (NSW Branch); 2021–present	Incumbent
