= Daily =

Daily or The Daily may refer to:

== Journalism ==
- Daily newspaper, newspaper issued on five to seven day of most weeks
- The Daily (podcast), a podcast by The New York Times
- The Daily (News Corporation), a defunct US-based iPad newspaper from News Corporation
- The Daily of the University of Washington, a student newspaper using The Daily as its standardhead

== Places ==
- Daily Township, Dixon County, Nebraska, United States

== People ==
- Bill Daily (1927–2018), American actor
- Bryson Daily (born c. 2003), American football player
- Elizabeth Daily (born 1961), American voice actress
- Gretchen Daily (born 1964), American environmental scientist
- Joseph E. Daily (1888–1965), American jurist
- Thomas Vose Daily (1927–2017), American Roman Catholic bishop

== Other usages ==
- Iveco Daily, a large van produced by Iveco
- Dailies, unedited footage in film

== See also ==
- Dailey, surname
- Daley (disambiguation)
- Daly (disambiguation)
- Epiousion, a Greek word used in the Lord's Prayer traditionally translated as 'daily'
