= Michael Daley =

Australian politician

The Honourable Michael Daley MP
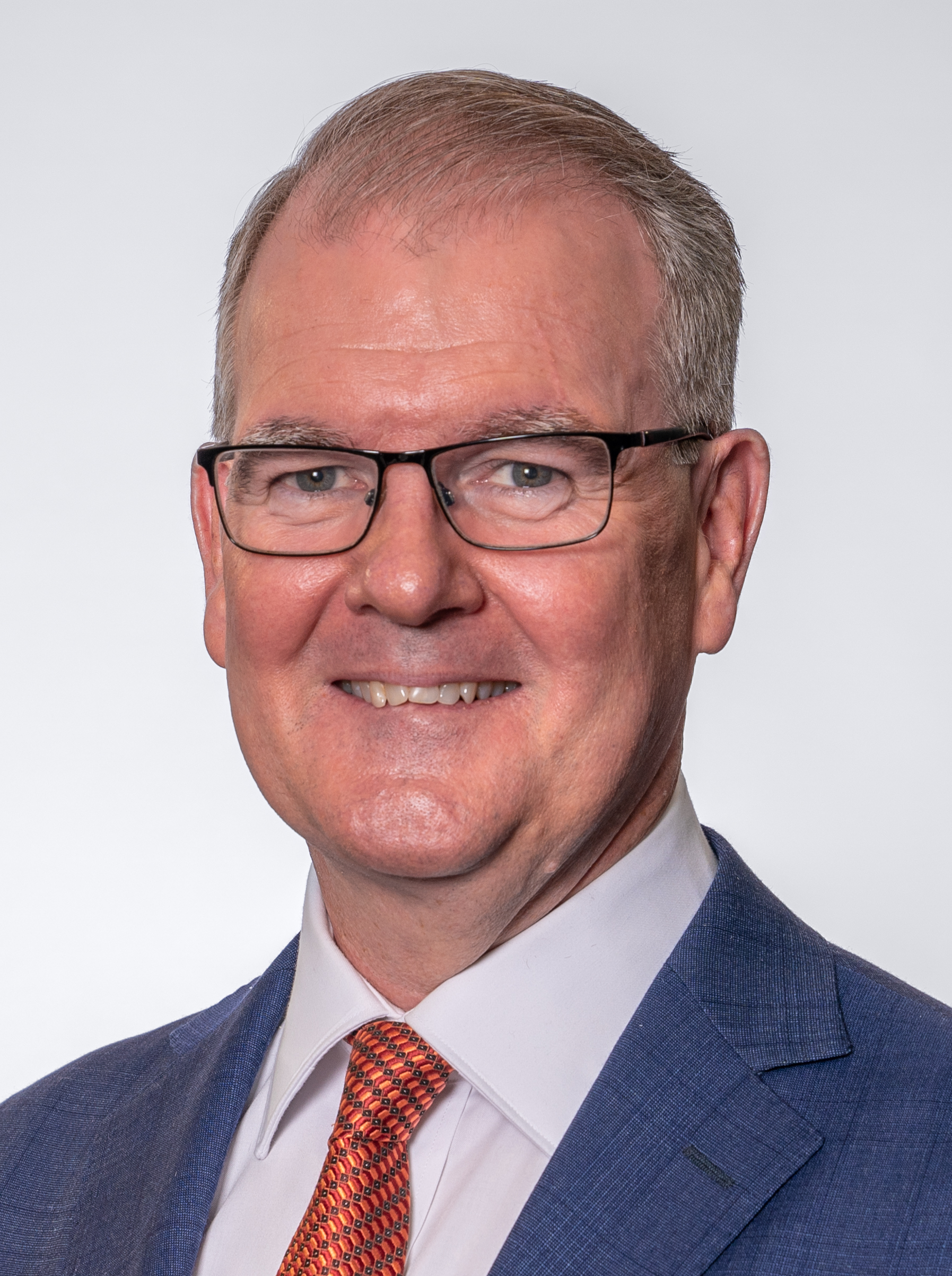
- Official portrait, 2024

Attorney General of New South Wales
- Incumbent
- Assumed office 28 March 2023
- Premier: Chris Minns
- Preceded by: Mark Speakman

Leader of the Opposition in New South Wales
- In office 10 November 2018 – 25 March 2019
- Premier: Gladys Berejiklian
- Deputy: Penny Sharpe
- Preceded by: Luke Foley
- Succeeded by: Jodi McKay

Leader of the New South Wales Labor Party
- In office 10 November 2018 – 25 March 2019
- Deputy: Penny Sharpe
- Preceded by: Luke Foley
- Succeeded by: Penny Sharpe (acting); Jodi McKay
Previous ministerial positions
Minister for Police and Finance
In office 17 November 2009 – 28 March 2011
Premier	Nathan Rees; Kristina Keneally
Preceded by	Himself
Succeeded by	Mike Gallacher (Police); Greg Pearce (Finance)
Minister for Police
In office 14 September 2009 – 17 November 2009
Premier	Nathan Rees
Preceded by	Tony Kelly
Succeeded by	Himself
Minister for Roads
In office 8 September 2008 – 14 September 2009
Premier	Nathan Rees
Preceded by	Eric Roozendaal
Succeeded by	David Borger

Member of the New South Wales Parliament for Maroubra
- Incumbent
- Assumed office 17 September 2005
- Preceded by: Bob Carr

Deputy Mayor of Randwick
- In office September 2000 – 20 April 2004
- Mayor: Dominic Sullivan
- Preceded by: Shane Barber
- Succeeded by: Bruce Notley-Smith

Councillor of the Randwick City Council for South Ward
- In office 9 September 1995 – 13 September 2008

Personal details
- Born: 1 November 1965 (age 61) Maroubra, New South Wales, Australia
- Party: Labor
- Education: Marcellin College Randwick
- Alma mater: Barristers and Solicitors Admission Board
- Profession: Lawyer
- Website: michaeldaley.com.au

Michael John Daley (born 1 November 1965) is an Australian politician who has served as the attorney general of New South Wales since 2023. He previously served as the leader of the opposition and leader of the New South Wales Labor Party from 2018 to 2019. He has been a member of the New South Wales Legislative Assembly for Maroubra since 2005.

== Early career ==
In 1998, having completed his legal studies he was admitted to the Supreme Court of New South Wales as a legal practitioner and began to pursue a career as a lawyer, and worked for a year in a law firm in central Sydney before spending five years as a senior in-house lawyer with NRMA Motoring and Services.

Daley was elected as a councillor to Randwick City Council in 1995 and served as deputy mayor from 2000 to 2004.

== Political career ==
Daley is aligned with the Labor Right faction. He was elected to represent Maroubra for the Australian Labor Party on 17 September 2005, replacing previous Labor member Bob Carr, who announced his retirement from politics. Daley served on the backbench until the elevation of Nathan Rees as premier of New South Wales in September 2008 when Daley became the Minister for Roads on 8 September 2008. Daley held this position until a cabinet reshuffle on 14 September 2009, when he was subsequently appointed Minister for Police and Minister for Finance, positions he held until 4 December 2009.

When Kristina Keneally became Premier in December 2009 he remained as Minister for Police and Minister for Finance until the 2011 election, where he was one of just 20 Labor MPs elected. Daley was believed to be a potential candidate for the Labor leadership, however, he did not contest it. As a result, John Robertson was elected unopposed as Keneally's replacement, and Daley was appointed as Shadow Treasurer and Shadow Minister for Finance and Services in the Robertson shadow ministry and the subsequent Foley shadow ministry from 11 April 2011 to 10 March 2016 and 28 March 2014, respectively.

In March 2016 he was appointed Shadow Minister for Gaming and Racing, Shadow Minister for Planning and Infrastructure which he held on to until 27 November 2018. He also served as Deputy Leader of the Opposition from 7 March 2016 before being elected as the Leader of the Opposition on 10 November 2018.

=== Leader of the Opposition ===
Following Luke Foley's resignation of the role, Daley nominated for the role of New South Wales Labor leader and Leader of the New South Wales Opposition. On 10 November 2018, Daley won the leadership election against Chris Minns 33 votes to 12, and was elected as the Leader of the Labor Party in New South Wales and became the 38th NSW Leader of the Opposition.

On 19 March 2019, a few days before the state election, a video from September 2018 surfaced in which Daley made comments about Asian immigration in Sydney. Daley said "Our young children will flee and who are they being replaced with? They are being replaced by young people from typically Asia with PhDs," and "So there's a transformation happening in Sydney now where our kids are moving out and foreigners are moving in and taking their jobs". Daley apologised from his comments, stating "What I was referring to was housing affordability in Sydney ... I could've expressed myself better, no offence was meant." The party was unsuccessful in the election a few days later, and Daley subsequently stood aside as leader and withdrew his candidacy for the subsequent leadership ballot after initially stating that he would contest it. Jodi McKay became the new permanent as party leader and opposition leader in June 2019 after Daley's resignation.

On 30 May 2021, following the resignation of McKay as party leader, Daley announced he would run again for party leadership. On 4 June 2021, he dropped out of the leadership contest, allowing Chris Minns to be elected leader unopposed.

== Personal life ==
Daley is of Irish Catholic background. He was educated at Marcellin College, Randwick, finishing in 1983. He spent 13 years as a customs officer with the Australian Customs Service, during which time he studied law at night.

Daley married Christina Ithier in 2005 whom he met "at a photocopier" at his legal firm in 1997. She had two children from a previous marriage whom Daley counts as his own. He and Christina have since had two other children.

== See also ==
- Shadow Ministry of Michael Daley
- Minns ministry

Civic offices
Preceded by Shane Barber	Deputy Mayor of Randwick; 2000–2004	Succeeded by Bruce Notley-Smith
New South Wales Legislative Assembly
Preceded by Bob Carr	Member for Maroubra; 2005–present	Incumbent
Political offices
Preceded by Eric Roozendaal	Minister for Roads; 2008–2009	Succeeded by David Campbell
Preceded by Tony Kelly	Minister for Police; 2009–2011	Succeeded by Mike Gallacher as Minister for Police and Emergency Services
Preceded by Joe Tripodi	Minister for Finance; 2009–2011	Succeeded by Greg Pearce as Minister for Finance and Services
Preceded by Linda Burney	Deputy Leader of the Opposition (NSW); 2016–2018	Succeeded by Penny Sharpe
Preceded by Luke Foley	Leader of the Opposition (NSW); 2018–2019	Succeeded by Penny Sharpe (Interim)
Preceded by Mark Speakman	Attorney General; 2023–present	Incumbent
Party political offices
Preceded by Linda Burney	Deputy Leader of the NSW Labor Party; 2016–2018	Succeeded by Penny Sharpe
Preceded by Luke Foley	Leader of the NSW Labor Party; 2018–2019	Succeeded by Penny Sharpe (Interim)
