= Adam Searle =

Australian politician

The Honourable Adam Searle
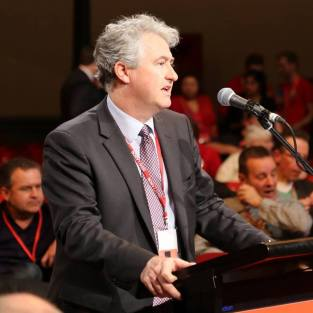
- Adam Searle MLC addresses NSW Labor conference 2015

Leader of the Opposition in the Legislative Council
- In office 5 May 2015 – 8 June 2021
- Preceded by: Luke Foley
- Succeeded by: Penny Sharpe

Deputy Leader of the Opposition in the Legislative Council
- In office 14 Jun 2011 – 6 Mar 2015
- Preceded by: Luke Foley
- Succeeded by: Walt Secord

Member of the New South Wales Legislative Council
- In office 24 May 2011 – 3 March 2023
- Preceded by: John Hatzistergos

20th Mayor of the City of Blue Mountains
- In office 30 September 2008 – 21 September 2010
- Deputy: Janet Mays
- Preceded by: Jim Angel
- Succeeded by: Daniel Myles

Councillor of the City of Blue Mountains for Second Ward
- In office 11 September 1999 – 8 September 2012

Personal details
- Born: 29 April 1969 (age 57) Sydney, Australia
- Party: Labor Party
- Profession: Barrister
- Website: adamsearle.org

Adam Searle (born 29 April 1969) is an Australian barrister and Labor Party politician. He was a member of the New South Wales Legislative Council from May 2011 until March 2023. He was the Leader of the Opposition in the Legislative Council of New South Wales between April 2015 and June 2021. He was the opposition spokesman and Shadow Minister for Industry, Resources & Energy and Shadow Minister for Industrial Relations.

== Early life ==
Searle was born in Sydney and raised on the far north coast of NSW. He returned to Sydney to complete school and attended Sydney University.

== Career ==
Searle joined the Australian Labor Party in 1985 and has been an active member since, holding various positions at branch and electorate council levels. He has frequently been a delegate to the NSW Annual Conference and in 2004 was a delegate to the National Conference.

He served on Blue Mountains City Council from September 1999 and was Mayor from September 2008 until September 2010. In the 2001 federal election, Searle unsuccessfully contested the federal electorate of Macquarie.

Searle worked for NSW Labor in opposition from 1994 to 1995 and as Chief of Staff to NSW Attorney General and Minister for Industrial Relations, Jeff Shaw, from 1995 to 2000. Adam worked on the Industrial Relations Act 1996, which was used as a model by other State Labor governments. He was also involved in significant law reform across a range of areas such as anti-discrimination, occupational health and safety and special laws for those suffering asbestos and related illnesses to ensure they receive quick and fair trials.

In 2000, Searle commenced practicing law as a barrister in the areas of employment and industrial law and has been involved in a number of leading cases, including the pay equity case for childcare workers. He is still a member of the NSW Bar Association.

He was one of the expert panel of lawyers appointed by the NSW Government to examine the law relating to workplace deaths, which led to the enactment of legislation dealing specifically with workplace fatalities in 2005.

=== State parliament ===
In May 2011, Searle was elected to the NSW Legislative Council to fill a casual vacancy caused by the resignation of former NSW Attorney General, John Hatzistergos. He was soon after elected Deputy Leader of the Labor Party in the Legislative Council and took on the role of Shadow Minister for Small Business and Industrial Relations prior to his current leadership and portfolio responsibilities. In 2015, Searle became the Leader of the Opposition in the Legislative Council.

For a week in May and June 2021, Searle was interim party leader between Jodi McKay's resignation as leader and the subsequent leadership vote. On 8 June 2021, Searle was replaced as Leader of the Opposition in the Legislative Council by Penny Sharpe.

== Personal life ==
Searle resides in the Blue Mountains and takes an active interest in local affairs. He enjoys reading and bush walking.

Civic offices
Preceded by Jim Angel	Mayor of the City of Blue Mountains; 2008–2010	Succeeded by Daniel Myles
