= Nathan Rees =

Premier of New South Wales from 2008 to 2009

The Honourable Nathan Rees
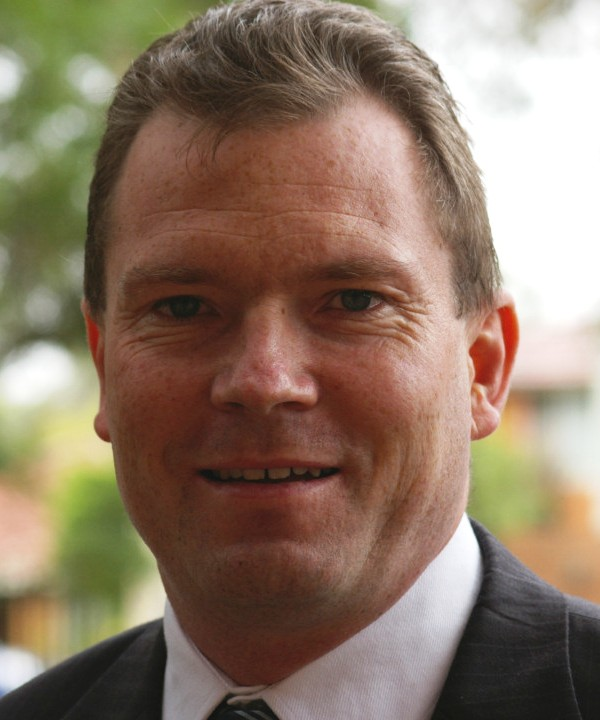

41st Premier of New South Wales
- In office 5 September 2008 – 4 December 2009
- Monarch: Elizabeth II
- Governor: Marie Bashir
- Deputy: Carmel Tebbutt
- Preceded by: Morris Iemma
- Succeeded by: Kristina Keneally

Member of the New South Wales Legislative Assembly for Toongabbie
- In office 24 March 2007 – 6 March 2015
- Preceded by: District established
- Succeeded by: District abolished
Ministerial offices 2007–2009
Minister for the Arts
In office 8 September 2008 – 4 December 2009
Premier	Himself
Preceded by	Frank Sartor
Succeeded by	Virginia Judge
Minister for the Central Coast
In office 14 September 2009 – 4 December 2009
Premier	Himself
Preceded by	John Hatzistergos
Succeeded by	Ian Macdonald
Minister for Emergency Services
In office 2 April 2007 – 5 September 2008
Premier	Morris Iemma
Preceded by	Tony Kelly
Succeeded by	Tony Kelly
Minister for Water
In office 27 February 2008 – 5 September 2008
Premier	Morris Iemma
Preceded by	Himself (as Minister for Water Utilities); Phil Koperberg (as Minister for Climate Change, Environment and Water)
Succeeded by	Phil Costa
Minister for Water Utilities
In office 2 April 2007 – 27 February 2008
Premier	Morris Iemma
Preceded by	David Campbell
Succeeded by	Himself (as Minister for Water)

Personal details
- Born: 12 February 1968 (age 58) Sydney, New South Wales, Australia
- Party: Labor Party
- Spouse: Stacey Haines
- Education: Northmead Creative and Performing Arts High School; University of Sydney

Nathan Rees (/riːz/; born 12 February 1968) is an Australian former politician who served as the 41st Premier of New South Wales and leader of the New South Wales Labor Party from September 2008 to December 2009. Rees was a Member of the New South Wales Legislative Assembly, representing Toongabbie for Labor from 2007 to 2015.

Rees replaced Morris Iemma as Premier and party leader on 5 September 2008. At 40 years and 206 days of age, Rees became the youngest person to assume the office, a record that has since been surpassed by Dominic Perrottet. On 3 December 2009, Rees was deposed as leader of the Labor Party by Kristina Keneally after he resoundingly lost a secret ballot in the Labor Party caucus after fifteen months as Premier. He is the shortest-serving member of the New South Wales Parliament to become Premier since Federation, and the only Labor Premier of New South Wales not to lead the party into an election.

== Early life ==
Rees was born in 1968 in Western Sydney to parents Daryl and Frances, his mother being a longtime member of the Labor Party, reportedly from Penrith, New South Wales. He attended Northmead Creative and Performing Arts High School where he served as school captain. On leaving school he initially took up a horticultural apprenticeship and worked as a greenskeeper for Parramatta Council. Subsequently, he went on to study English literature at the University of Sydney, attaining an honours degree in 1994, supporting himself by working as a garbage collector at the same council. During his time at the Council he became Secretary of the then Municipal and Shire Employees Union.

Rees was a long-distance runner, and a member of the Parramatta Cycling Club, where he won many events. When training for races, Rees would cycle up to 1,000 km per week. He once attained third place in a state triathlon.

== Politics ==
Rees's first job in politics was in 1995, when he became an adviser to the then deputy premier Andrew Refshauge, for whom his mother, Frances, worked. During this period, Rees cycled between Bullaburra in the Blue Mountains, where he lived at the time, and central Sydney, a distance of more than 90 km (56 mi).

He subsequently worked for Ministers Craig Knowles and Morris Iemma, and as chief of staff for Minister Milton Orkopoulos. Rees transferred to the Premier's office in 2006, three months before Orkopoulos was charged with child sexual abuse. Rees has stated that he had no knowledge of the crimes committed by Orkopoulos, and would have reported him to the police had he been aware of them.

=== Minister for Water Utilities and Minister for Emergency Services ===
Rees was elected to the New South Wales Legislative Assembly on 24 March 2007. He was almost immediately promoted to cabinet, becoming Minister for Emergency Services and Minister for Water Utilities on 2 April 2007.

As Minister for Water Utilities, Rees was responsible for implementing the $1.9 billion Sydney Desalination Plant at Kurnell, and the proposed Tillegra Dam in the Hunter Region.

At the time Rees was appointed Minister for Water Utilities, Sydney was experiencing extreme drought conditions requiring transfer of water from the Shoalhaven River to Sydney and the imposition of water restrictions.

The construction of the controversial Sydney Desalination Plant to prepare Sydney for future droughts was completed whilst Rees was Minister. The project came in $60 million under budget and doubled the initial capacity. Contracts were also entered into to provide for the powering of the desalination plant through renewable sources.

In July 2008, he was touted by the Sydney media as being a contender for Premier. Rees denied that he was a contender for the role, saying that "Premier Iemma has my rock-solid, unequivocal support and he knows that". Two months after this interview, Morris Iemma was deposed as Premier in favour of Rees.

=== Premier ===
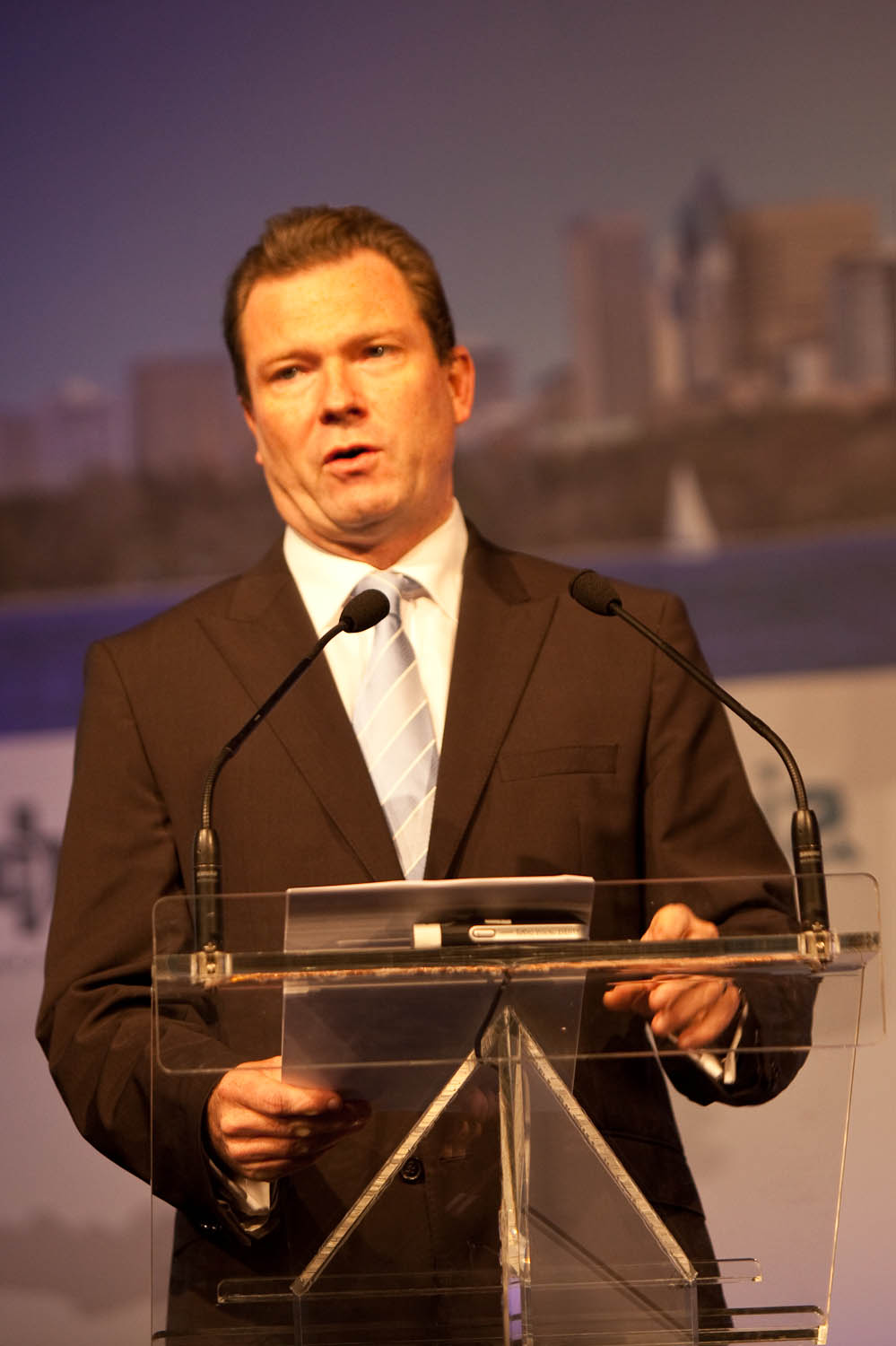
Rees in 2009

Iemma resigned on 5 September 2008 after his own Right faction rebuffed his plans to reshuffle the Cabinet. However, the Right had no credible replacement candidate. It thus agreed to support Rees, a member of the Socialist Left faction. Thus, later in the day, Rees was unanimously elected Labor leader, and hence Premier. He was sworn in by the Lieutenant Governor of New South Wales, Chief Justice of New South Wales James Spigelman after only nineteen months as a member of parliament. Carmel Tebbutt was elected unanimously as Deputy Leader, and thus Deputy Premier. The following Monday, 8 September, Rees was also sworn in as Minister for the Arts.

A slump in revenues during the 2008 financial crisis compelled Rees and the State Treasurer Eric Roozendaal to implement a mini-budget which was handed down on 11 November 2008. The mini-budget increased taxes and charges such as land tax, mineral royalties, parking space levies and also announced the privatisation of state assets. A universal scheme providing free travel on public transport for all students going to and from school was curtailed—a decision since reversed—and the previously announced North West Metro and South West rail projects were indefinitely postponed. A series of by-elections to replace former Premier Morris Iemma, Deputy Premier John Watkins and Health Minister Reba Meagher resulted in massive swings against the government and saw John Watkins' former seat of Ryde resoundingly lost to the Liberals.

Soon after returning from his wedding in New York, Rees dismissed rumours of a leadership challenge within the Labor party. After the resignation of John Della Bosca as Minister for Health and the Central Coast, and after a subsequent cabinet reshuffle, Rees appointed himself as Minister for the Central Coast.

On 14 November 2009, Rees was granted extraordinary powers by the New South Wales Labor State Conference to pick his own cabinet (usually the Labor caucus and Head Office chooses the ministry, and the leader only assigns portfolios). The next day Rees sacked Finance Minister (and Labor powerbroker) Joe Tripodi, Primary Industries Minister Ian Macdonald, and Parliamentary Secretaries Henry Tsang and Sonia Hornery for blocking key reforms aimed at distancing the government from corruption and improving the provision of services to constituents and for plotting to remove him from the premiership. This was the fourth cabinet reshuffle since Rees took over the premiership.

==== Economy ====
Rees took over as Premier on 5 September 2008. Eleven days later, Lehman Brothers collapsed during the 2008 financial crisis.

The Rees government responded to the crisis with a three-point plan. Firstly, Rees reaffirmed his government's commitment to the retention of a Triple A credit rating. Rees emphasised that as finance and credit became harder to get around the world, retaining a Triple A credit rating was essential to being able to borrow money at the lowest rates available. Secondly, as chair of the government's Budget sub-committee, Rees announced there would be a mini-budget which was delivered in November 2008. The mini-budget delayed a number of large-scale capital works projects with long lead times and instead emphasised capital expenditure on smaller projects which could generate employment more quickly. Third, Rees drew industry and business leaders together to conduct a job summit. This summit was co-chaired by Roger Corbett, Steve Harkins and David Gonski. In addition to the Work Plan developed by the summit, Rees also announced the establishment of 4,000 government apprenticeships across the state and 2,000 cadetships.

After the delivery of the 2009/10 Budget, the AAA credit rating in NSW was reaffirmed by the major credit ratings agencies and the agency's outlook for NSW was upgraded from negative to stable. Rees has since claimed that NSW is the only jurisdiction in the world to have improved its credit rating during the 2008 financial crisis.

The 2009/10 Rees Budget had the largest capital works expenditure to date in the State's history, more than $18 billion.

==== Education ====
In his short period as Premier, Rees and his Education Minister, Verity Firth, made substantial changes to the NSW Education system. From 1998 to 2008, there had only been a slight increase in the retention rate for students remaining to complete Year 12, with significant inequality as measured by socio-economic status. In response, in January 2009, Rees announced that he would be increasing the minimum leaving age from 15 to 17 years.

Together with the Federal government, Rees also established 175,000 new training places in the vocational training sector, and provided a training guarantee for apprentices who had had their apprenticeships interrupted.

Controversially, Rees also introduced non-religious Ethics classes into primary schools against fierce opposition from church groups.

==== Law and order ====
Shortly after coming to office, the death of an outlaw motorcycle gang member at Sydney airport required Rees to introduce controversial laws aimed at banning criminal gangs. Fierce opposition from civil libertarians followed, and in June 2011, the High Court ruled against the government.

In the 09/10 Budget, the NSW police force was provided with $10 million to equip frontline police with Taser stun guns.

Rees also introduced measures aimed at reducing alcohol-related violence. These included mandatory lockouts, plastic cups and the naming and shaming of the most violent venues. In the comparison period, 'glassings' went from 17 incidents in the previous year to one incident after these measures were introduced.

Despite ongoing disputes between criminal gangs, the Bureau of Crime Statistics and Research reported that in the 24 months to December 2010, ten of the 17 major offence categories were stable and seven were falling.

==== Environment ====
Building on the environmental legacy of Bob Carr, Rees announced the preservation of the last remaining large tract of River Red Gums in the state's south. This completed the forest preservation program commenced by Carr, who had preserved the North Coast and Brigalow natural heritage areas.

Rees also announced the establishment of Yengo National Park in the Upper Hunter region; 120,000 hectares of pristine bushland, in June 2009. Furthermore, the Rees government announced an additional 65,000 hectares of land in Yanga National Park in the Riverina.

==== Transport ====
Successive Labor administrations had been criticised for inadequate spending on public transport. Financially restrained from large-scale projects due to the 2008 financial crisis, Rees and his Transport Minister David Campbell determined that massive expansion of the bus network would improve transport options more quickly than large heavy rail expansions. Accordingly, 450 new buses were ordered.

Rees also opened the Epping to Chatswood rail line, the first piece of significant rail infrastructure in a decade, and projected usage was quickly outstripped.

In November 2009, Rees announced approval for Stage 2 of the South West Rail Link, a $1.3 billion project to improve public rail services to south western Sydney.

Rees and Campbell enjoyed a close working relationship, and on their watch train service reliability rose to a ten-year high of 95% on-time running. They also announced the restoration of ferry services from the city to Parramatta to ease rail and road congestion. To ease congestion in city centres, free shuttle buses were also introduced into Sydney city and Wollongong. To encourage public transport use on weekends, the Rees Government introduced $2.50 Family Fun Day fares for Sundays, with discount entry to museums and other tourist locations. Rees and Campbell also delivered a simplified fare structure for the rail network and 300 new buses.

==== Health ====
Rees established the Bureau of Health Information in July 2009 to produce regular and timely reports on the performance of the NSW health system, including waiting lists, and developing and distributing tools to allow users to interrogate data.

While often criticised for the performance of hospitals, Rees was able to point to an Australian Government report titled The State of Our Public Hospitals which in June 2009 reported that NSW had the best elective surgery and emergency department performances in Australia.

Rees also introduced eyesight screening for preschoolers to complement universal hearing tests previously introduced by Craig Knowles.

==== Aboriginal affairs ====
In November 2009, Rees announced the single largest handback of Aboriginal land in the state's history. The Yuin people of the South Coast of NSW had lodged a claim under the Aboriginal Land Rights Act for 20,000 hectares bordering the Morton National Park, including Yarramumum and Boolijong Creeks and parts of the Yerriyong State Forest. Rees granted the claim in full.

==== Arts ====
As Arts Minister, one of Rees early tasks was to announce the establishment of an annual festival, Vivid Sydney. Described as a 'festival of lights and ideas', the inaugural curator was Brian Eno, an influential music and album producer. Despite being an international superstar in his own field, the choice of Eno was the subject of derision by sections of the media. Many argued they would have preferred to have Tiger Woods (who was to play golf in Victoria). Rees famously said "I'd rather have Brian Eno for two weeks than Tiger Woods for 3 days".

While Minister for the Arts, Rees also granted independence to the National Art School, and commenced master planning for a new visual arts centre at the Old King's School site in Parramatta. This latter commitment was retained by Kristina Keneally when she took over as Premier, and it formed the central element of the Arts policy announcement in the 2011 election.

Rees also established the sub-continental festival 'Parramasala' based in Parramatta, and he was instrumental in bringing A.R. Rahman, of Slumdog Millionaire fame, to Sydney for a free open-air concert which attracted more than 50,000 people to Parramatta Park.

==== Labor links with unions ====
Acknowledging Labor history, Rees and the Lord Mayor of Sydney officially renamed parts of Hickson Road, The Rocks, as 'The Hungry Mile'. In years past, unemployed men would line up for work each day, thus giving the strip its name. A ceremony recognising the change was held on 29 July 2009.

NSW Labor had also been instrumental in holding the asbestos firm James Hardie to account. Under Premier Bob Carr, the Jackson Inquiry precipitated an ongoing fund to be established and maintained by James Hardie to provide for future payouts to sufferers of asbestosis. James Hardie made inadequate provision, and Rees intervened in 2009 to ensure that affected individuals would be able to claim into the future. A number of directors of James Hardie were ruled ineligible to be directors arising from their role in James Hardie restructures.

==== Government reform ====
After 15 years in government, there had been a number of scandals involving Labor ministers which were reported negatively in the press. Rees distanced himself from these with a range of reforms. Rees overhauled the Freedom of Information Act and replaced it with the Government Information (Public Access) Act which had an explicit bias towards public disclosure of documentation and Government information. Rees also appointed an independent commissioner to oversee the operation of this Act.

In November 2009, Rees announced that he wanted to move towards public funding of election campaigns instead of a reliance on large corporate donations. To further this, he established a Parliamentary Joint Select Committee which recommended sweeping changes to donation laws. Rees also banned donations from property developers to the NSW Labor Party.

Rees also introduced the requirement for lobbyists to be registered and to abide by a Lobbyist Code of Conduct.

=== Resignation ===
On 3 December 2009, Rees was forced to face a spill motion at a caucus meeting. The motion passed 43 to 25. In the subsequent leadership vote, the dominant right faction threw its support to Planning Minister Kristina Keneally, who defeated Rees by 47 votes to 21. Earlier that day, Rees said at a press conference, "Should I not be premier by the end of this day, let there be no doubt in the community’s mind. No doubt, that any challenger will be a puppet of Eddie Obeid and Joe Tripodi." On 22 October 2010, Rees was granted by the Governor retention of the title "The Honourable". Rees is the first New South Wales Labor Party Premier not to take the party into an election. He was also the first NSW Labor leader since Pat Hills who did not lead the party into a general election.

Following his removal as Premier, Rees declined to serve in the Keneally Cabinet, and went to the backbench until the March 2011 election.

The Keneally government was heavily defeated at the 2011 state election. Rees nearly lost his own seat, suffering a massive 14.2 percent swing and surviving by only 205 votes. By comparison, he'd won election in 2007 with 64.5 percent of the two-party vote; he was one of several MPs from Labor's traditional stronghold of west Sydney who saw their majorities more than halved. Following the election, new Opposition leader John Robertson appointed Rees as Shadow Minister for Police and Emergency Services and Shadow Minister for the Arts in his Shadow Cabinet.

=== Independent Commission Against Corruption ===
In 2013, the Independent Commission Against Corruption (ICAC) commenced public hearings into the allegations of corrupt conduct by Ian Macdonald and Eddie Obeid. Both men had been instrumental in the removal of Rees as Premier. The ICAC findings released after the hearings were scathing of both men. Both Macdonald and Obeid were found to have acted corruptly by the ICAC, who recommended the Director of Public Prosecutions give consideration to criminal charges being laid against both men. Rees repeatedly stressed he did not feel vindicated, but rather was distressed that the Party and its members had been subject to the smear of association with those who had been investigated.

=== Retirement ===
On 28 March 2014, after resigning from the Shadow Cabinet, Rees announced that he would be retiring from politics and would not contest the next state election in 2015. This was likely prompted by a redistribution that seemingly made his seat impossible to hold. The bulk of his old seat of Toongabbie had been transferred into a recreated Seven Hills, notionally a fairly safe Liberal seat.

== Post-political career ==
In October 2014, following his announcement to retire from politics, Rees took up a position as the chief executive of the Public Education Foundation (PEF), a non-profit organisation that provides scholarships to disadvantaged students to support them to stay at school: "The public education system in NSW is very strong but this foundation will allow those kids who may not have the resources to buy the extra book or the bit of software they need."

After leaving the PEF, Rees was subsequently appointed as the National Assistant Secretary of the Finance Sector Union (FSU) in May 2017 where he worked until early 2021. Rees then joined MetLife Australia as Head of External Affairs & Public Policy.

In August 2022, the NSW Government appointed Rees as chair of Transport Heritage NSW until 31 May 2025.

== Personal life ==
Rees is a non-practising Roman Catholic and proudly describes himself as "a westie". He met his wife, Stacey Haines, at Northmead High School when they were both aged 14. Rees and Haines married in a ceremony at the Manhattan Marriage Bureau in New York City on 7 January 2009.

Rees is a supporter of NRL club Parramatta Eels.

New South Wales Legislative Assembly
New district	Member for Toongabbie; 2007 – 2015	Seat abolished
Political offices
Preceded by Tony Kelly	Minister for Emergency Services; 2007 – 2008	Succeeded by Tony Kelly
Preceded by David Campbell	Minister for Water Utilities; 2007 – 2008	Succeeded by Himself
Preceded by Himself as Minister for Water Utilities	Minister for Water; 2008	Succeeded by Phil Costa
Preceded by Phil Koperberg as Minister for Climate Change, Environment and Water	Minister for Water; 2008	Succeeded by Phil Costa
Preceded by Morris Iemma	Premier of New South Wales; 2008 – 2009	Succeeded by Kristina Keneally
Preceded by Frank Sartor	Minister for the Arts; 2008 – 2009	Succeeded by Virginia Judge
Preceded by John Hatzistergos	Minister for the Central Coast; 2009	Succeeded by Ian Macdonald
Party political offices
Preceded by Morris Iemma	Leader of the Australian Labor Party in New South Wales; 2008 – 2009	Succeeded by Kristina Keneally
