= Walt Secord =

Canadian-born Australian politician

The Honourable Walt Secord

Member of the New South Wales Legislative Council
- In office 24 May 2011 – 3 March 2023
- Preceded by: Eddie Obeid
Shadow Ministerial offices 2012–2022
Shadow Minister for Arts
In office 10 March 2016 – 15 August 2022
Leader	Luke Foley; Michael Daley; Jodi McKay; Chris Minns
Preceded by	Luke Foley
Succeeded by	John Graham
Shadow Minister for Police and Counter-terrorism
In office 12 June 2021 – 15 August 2022
Leader	Chris Minns
Preceded by	Lynda Voltz
Succeeded by	Paul Scully
Shadow Minister for Heritage
In office 12 June 2021 – 15 August 2022
Leader	Chris Minns
Preceded by	Kate Washington
Succeeded by	Penny Sharpe
Shadow Minister for the North Coast
In office 12 June 2021 – 15 August 2022
Leader	Chris Minns
Preceded by	Adam Searle
Succeeded by	John Graham
In office 11 December 2013 – 3 July 2019
Leader	John Robertson; Luke Foley; Michael Daley
Succeeded by	Adam Searle
Shadow Treasurer
In office 3 July 2019 – 25 May 2021
Leader	Jodi McKay
Preceded by	Ryan Park
Succeeded by	Daniel Mookhey
Shadow Special Minister of State
In office 3 July 2019 – 25 May 2021
Leader	Jodi McKay
Succeeded by	John Graham
In office 17 October 2012 – 11 December 2013
Leader	John Robertson
Preceded by	Steve Whan
Shadow Minister for Health
In office 19 September 2014 – 3 July 2019
Leader	John Robertson; Luke Foley; Michael Daley
Preceded by	Andrew McDonald
Succeeded by	Ryan Park
Shadow Minister for Medical Research
In office 27 November 2018 – 3 July 2019
Leader	Michael Daley
Preceded by	Tania Mihailuk
Succeeded by	Jenny Aitchison
Shadow Minister for Mental Health
In office 27 November 2018 – 3 July 2019
Leader	Michael Daley
Preceded by	Tania Mihailuk
Succeeded by	Tara Moriarty
Shadow Minister for Liquor Regulation
In office 19 September 2014 – 7 April 2015
Leader	John Robertson; Luke Foley
Shadow Minister for Roads
In office 11 December 2013 – 19 September 2014
Leader	John Robertson
Preceded by	Ryan Park
Succeeded by	Michael Daley
Shadow Minister for Water
In office 17 October 2012 – 11 December 2013
Leader	John Robertson
Preceded by	Luke Foley
Succeeded by	Barry Collier

Personal details
- Born: 25 December 1964 (age 61) Mississaugas of the New Credit First Nation, Ontario, Canada
- Party: Labor Party
- Education: York University
- Occupation: Journalist

Walter Secord (born 25 December 1964) is a Canadian-born former Australian politician. He was a Labor Party member of the New South Wales Legislative Council from May 2011 to March 2023.

Secord was previously chief of staff to former NSW Premier, Kristina Keneally. He is the NSW patron of the Labor Israel Action Committee.

== Early life and education ==
Secord was born in Hamilton, Ontario, and grew up on the Mississaugas of the Credit (Indian reserve) First Nation in Southern Ontario, Canada. He is a Mohawk-Ojibwe man whose father is a status Indian. He spent the first 17 years of his life on an Indian reserve. He states he is "fiercely proud of [his] aboriginal ancestry" and "that it shapes [his] social justice."

He has two siblings. His brother, Dan, is a budding native rights leader in Canada and conducts annual Ojibway language camp ceremonies for native prisoners in Canada's toughest prisons. He was the first member of his father's family to complete high school and the first to fly in an aeroplane.

== Early career and higher education ==
He studied arts at York University in Toronto, and worked as a journalist for the Toronto Star before emigrating to Australia in September 1988. He became an Australian citizen in June 1992.

From 1988 to 1991, he worked at the Australian Jewish News. In November 1991, he won an Australian Human Rights Award in 1991 for a series of articles in the Australian Jewish News.

Secord attained a master's degree in Strategic Public Relations from Sydney University in 2013. In May 2012, Secord won the Australian Press Council Prize (Postgraduate) in Media and Communications at the University of Sydney.

== Political career ==
Before entering parliament, Walt Secord served in senior roles at the local, NSW and federal levels including chief of staff to the NSW Premier (2009–2011); chief of staff to the NSW Treasurer (2009); director of communications to the longest-serving NSW Premier (1995–2005); director of communications to the Federal Opposition leader, who became Prime Minister (2007); and chief of staff to the national Minister for (Aged Care) Ageing (2007–2009).

Secord was Bob Carr’s communications director at the time of the 1999 state election. During this campaign, after speaking with Kristina Keneally, a member of John Watkins's campaign office team, he demanded that Watkins's campaign team "get that woman with an American accent off the telephones"; Keneally, who went on to serve as Premier of New South Wales, referenced this incident in her maiden speech; quipping "Well, I got off the phones that day, but today I have the floor." Secord went on to become Kevin Rudd's director of communications.

=== Legislative Council ===
Secord was appointed to a vacancy in the Legislative Council in 2011. In his almost twelve years in NSW Parliament, Secord served in more than a dozen Shadow Ministerial roles including four years as Deputy Opposition Leader in the Legislative Council.

Secord also served as Shadow Minister for Health, Shadow Minister for Roads, Shadow Minister for Police, Shadow Minister for Counter Terrorism, Shadow Special Minister of State, Shadow Minister for Mental Health, Shadow Minister for Medical Research, Shadow Minister for Water, Shadow Minister for the Arts and Heritage; Shadow Minister for Liquor Regulation and Shadow Minister for the North Coast.

Secord appointed as Shadow Treasurer, Shadow Minister for the Arts and Shadow Special Minister of State in the shadow cabinet of Jodi McKay in July 2019. Following Labor's defeat at the Upper Hunter by-election in May 2021, there was speculation that McKay would resign as party leader. After McKay announced she was not stepping down as party leader, Secord resigned from the shadow cabinet on 25 May 2021. He said it was "well-known that Jodi McKay and [he] have disagreed on key policy, parliamentary and strategic decisions and directions", and that he could no longer serve under her.

Secord served as Shadow Minister for the Arts and Heritage, Shadow Minister for Police and Counter Terrorism and Shadow Minister for the North Coast in the NSW Shadow Cabinet until his resignation in August 2022.

In 2022, Secord chaired the official parliamentary inquiry into the historic 2022 floods. In addition, he served as deputy chair of the NSW Parliamentary Friends of Israel; deputy chair of the NSW Parliamentary Friends of Armenia; and secretary of the NSW Parliamentary Friends of an Australian Head of State.

=== Resignation ===
Published on 12 August 2022, the Independent Review of Bullying, Sexual Harassment and Sexual Misconduct in NSW Parliamentary Workplaces 2022 headed by Elizabeth Broderick outlined a range of inappropriate behaviour that had taken place in NSW Parliament workplaces. The allegations in the report were made anonymously, as were the identities of the alleged offenders, but a submission obtained by the ABC identified Secord as the MP in the report described as "a vicious manipulative bully who particularly targeted junior staff and young women".

Secord apologised for his behaviour and resigned from the Shadow Ministry on 15 August 2022 in response to the bullying allegations.

In the Australian Jewish News, Secord later described the allegations against him as a “political assassination” and an “orchestrated plan.”

Secord addressed the allegations against him in his final speech to the NSW Parliament on 16 November 2022, claiming the allegations against him were the result of a conspiracy between “disgruntled supporters of the former Labor leader and a pocket of vicious anti-Israel actors”:

It would be remiss of me if I did not address the elephant in the room. I admit I was a tough operator in the New South Wales Labor Party and in the Parliament, but I assure you there are tougher ones. I was brought down when two forces conspired around a goal—getting me out of Parliament. Those cliques comprise mainly disgruntled supporters of the former Labor leader and a pocket of vicious anti-Israel actors. Addressing the first group, I do not at all regret starting the May 2021 process as shadow Treasurer that eventually saw the removal of the former Opposition leader. To the contrary, I am proud of my role in those events and in shaping Labor history. NSW Labor is in a much stronger position today than we were then. Anyone who denies that really needs to get out and talk to the community more often. As to the latter group, again I regret nothing. I believe it is imperative that there is always a strong Labor voice in support of the Jewish community and the State of Israel. This is akin to one person standing up to a mob and on that issue I proudly stand on my record.

Secord retired at the 2023 New South Wales state election.

== Personal life ==
Secord married his partner in October 2021. Secord is the deputy chair of NSW Parliamentary Friends of Israel. In 2020 he announced that he was converting to Judaism. He has visited Israel multiple times and previously worked for the Australian Jewish News. He described his conversion as "the logical step of a lifelong journey that was inevitable".
