= John Robertson (politician, born 1962) =

Australian politician

The Honourable John Robertson
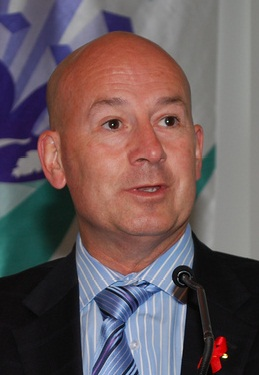

36th Leader of the Opposition in New South Wales
- In office 31 March 2011 – 23 December 2014
- Premier: Barry O'Farrell; Mike Baird
- Deputy: Linda Burney
- Preceded by: Barry O'Farrell
- Succeeded by: Luke Foley
Ministerial offices 2009–2011
Minister for Transport
In office 21 May 2010 – 28 March 2011
Premier	Kristina Keneally
Preceded by	David Campbell (as Minister for Transport and Roads)
Succeeded by	Gladys Berejiklian
Minister for the Central Coast
In office 5 June 2010 – 28 March 2011
Premier	Kristina Keneally
Preceded by	Ian Macdonald
Succeeded by	Chris Hartcher
Minister for Public Sector Reform
In office 30 January 2009 – 21 May 2010
Premier	Nathan Rees; Kristina Keneally
Preceded by	Position established
Succeeded by	Paul Lynch
Minister for Energy
In office 14 September 2009 – 21 May 2010
Premier	Nathan Rees; Kristina Keneally
Preceded by	Ian Macdonald
Succeeded by	Paul Lynch
Minister for Commerce
In office 8 December 2009 – 21 May 2010
Premier	Kristina Keneally
Preceded by	Jodi McKay
Succeeded by	Paul Lynch
Minister for Industrial Relations
In office 8 December 2009 – 21 May 2010
Premier	Kristina Keneally
Preceded by	John Hatzistergos
Succeeded by	Paul Lynch
Minister for Corrective Services
In office 30 January 2009 – 4 December 2009
Premier	Nathan Rees
Succeeded by	Phil Costa
Special Minister of State
In office 30 January 2009 – 4 December 2009
Premier	Nathan Rees
Minister for Climate Change and the Environment
In office 14 September 2009 – 4 December 2009
Premier	Nathan Rees
Preceded by	Carmel Tebbutt
Succeeded by	Frank Sartor

Member of the New South Wales Parliament for Blacktown
- In office 26 March 2011 – 25 August 2017
- Preceded by: Paul Gibson
- Succeeded by: Stephen Bali

Member of the New South Wales Legislative Council
- In office 18 October 2008 – 26 March 2011
- Preceded by: Michael Costa

Personal details
- Born: John Cameron Robertson; 16 November 1962 (age 64) Ryde, New South Wales
- Party: Labor
- Spouse: Julie McLeod
- Children: 3
- Education: University of Technology, Sydney
- Profession: Electrician; Union organiser

John Cameron "Robbo" Robertson (born 16 November 1962) is a former Australian politician who served as the leader of the Labor Party in New South Wales from 2011 to 2014. Before entering politics he was prominent in the union movement.

Robertson was born in Sydney, and worked as an electrician before becoming an organiser for the Electrical Trades Union. He became an industrial officer with the Labor Council of New South Wales in 1991, and was elected assistant secretary in 1998 and secretary in 2001. He also served as a vice-president of the Australian Council of Trade Unions. Robertson entered the New South Wales Legislative Council in 2008, and was appointed to cabinet in 2009. He switched to the Legislative Assembly at the 2011 state election, where the Labor Party suffered a heavy defeat. Robertson was elected party leader following Kristina Keneally's resignation, becoming leader of the opposition. He resigned the leadership in the aftermath of the 2014 Sydney hostage crisis, after the disclosure of a minor link with its perpetrator. Robertson left politics in August 2017 to work in the non-profit sector. On 9 September 2017, it was announced that Robertson would chair the board for public insurer, icare.

== Early life and personal background ==
Robertson was born at Ryde Hospital in New South Wales to parents Don and Rowena Robertson, the elder of their two boys. Don Robertson conscripted his son into handing out how to vote cards in the 1972 Australian elections.

Robertson was educated at Denistone East Primary School and Ryde High School. His first job was working for Woolworths packing shopping bags at the age of 15. He left school at 16 and began working as an apprentice electrical fitter. He worked as an electrician from 1979 until 1987 and worked on the New South Wales Parliament building. He claims to be the only person to have worked on the construction of the building and to have been voted into office to serve there.

Robertson is married to Julie McLeod and they have three children.

== Union career ==
During his time as an electrician, Robertson became an organiser for the Electrical Trades Union. In 1991, he became an industrial officer with the Labor Council of New South Wales, and then its executive officer in 1998. Later in life, he took up tertiary studies, and studied at the University of Technology, Sydney, graduating with a Graduate Diploma of Human Resources.

In 1998, Robertson became the assistant secretary of the Labor Council, with responsibility for the building and construction industry, breweries, local government, public sector policy, the oil industry and Sydney Water. In 2000, he ran the state wage case for the Labor Council before the Industrial Relations Commission of New South Wales. The case was historic in that it was the first one heard in Wollongong, New South Wales rather than Sydney. The Commission granted workers a $15 per week pay rise.

In 2001, Robertson was elected unopposed as the secretary of Unions NSW (formerly the Labor Council of New South Wales), replacing Michael Costa. One of his first acts as secretary was to organise a blockade of the New South Parliament to protest the introduction of workers compensation law reforms. The blockade did not change the government's plans. During his term as secretary, Robertson headed the organisation as it sold its holiday property "Currawong" to finance a campaign to stop the implementation of WorkChoices by the Federal Howard government. The deal was said to have benefited the developers as the purchase was at "about half the price" of other bids for the property. Currawong had been established in 1949 to allow the union movement to provide poor children with holidays. Robertson denied the deal was at less than value, as it was an unconditional sale compared to other bids which were conditional on building approval.

Robertson has been on the Administrative Committee of the Australian Labor Party since 2005 and became the vice-president of the Australian Council of Trade Unions (ACTU) in 2006. As member of the group Labor for Refugees, Robertson fought in 2002 to overturn the Labor Party's policy on asylum seekers, which mimicked the policy of the Howard government at the time. Robertson was a pivotal player in the campaign to replace Federal Opposition Leader Kim Beazley with Kevin Rudd in 2006.

Robertson has held numerous other roles including member of the Building and Construction Industry Long Service Payments Corporation in 1993 and director of WorkCover NSW between 2001 and 2007. In 2002, he was appointed as a director of the Parramatta Stadium Trust. In 2006, he became a member of the New South Wales Heritage Council. He was a director of Energy Australia between 1998 and 2003, as well as a director of 2KY radio between 1998 and 2001.

Robertson co-authored the book Your Rights at Work, which was published in 1993.

== Political career ==
On 18 October 2008, Robertson was endorsed to be the Labor Party candidate to fill the vacancy caused by the resignation of former state treasurer Michael Costa. He was subsequently appointed to the New South Wales Legislative Council (the state's upper house) to fill that casual vacancy. Costa was Robertson's predecessor at Unions NSW, and ironically, his role in blocking the privatisation of the NSW power industry was one of the causes that led to Costa's resignation.

Shortly after Robertson's swearing in, former Australian prime minister Paul Keating sent a scathing letter to Robertson stating that Keating was "ashamed to share membership of the same party" as him. Keating's view of Robertson was that his opposition to the privatisation bid would cost Labor dearly at the next State election.

Robertson won the seat of Blacktown in the New South Wales Legislative Assembly at the March 2011 election, despite the Labor government suffering the worst defeat of a sitting government in New South Wales since Federation. Robertson himself barely squeaked into office in what has historically been one of Labor's safest seats. He went into the election with a majority of 22.4 percent, on paper a comfortably safe margin. However, he suffered a swing of 18.7 percent, cutting the Labor majority down to a very marginal 3.7 percent. After Kristina Keneally announced she was standing down as state Labor leader and returning to the backbench, Robertson was heavily tipped to succeed her. On 31 March, Robertson was elected unopposed as leader of the Labor Party and Leader of the Opposition. His immediate task was rebuilding a party that had seen its caucus more than halved in the election held a week earlier—a result that Robertson said the party deserved, calling it "a devastating result, a message that was sent to us."

In the aftermath of the 2014 Sydney hostage crisis, it was revealed that Robertson had previously sent a letter on behalf of the gunman, Man Haron Monis, a constituent in his Blacktown electorate, to the Department of Family and Community Services. The letter was, according to Robertson, routine procedure on behalf of a constituent and written in support of Monis' request for a supervised visit with his children on Father's Day in 2011 despite an apprehended violence order against him. The Department declined Monis' request. Pressure mounted on Robertson to resign as Leader of the Labor Party, with the 2015 state election three months away. ABC News reported that several members of the Labor caucus were gathering support to have Robertson voted out if he didn't resign. Robertson stood aside on 23 December 2014, saying that "the next election is so important that Labor must be united behind the leader. Robertson was initially replaced by Linda Burney on an interim basis, and then by Luke Foley. He was the first NSW Labor leader since Pat Hills not to go on to become premier, and only the third in almost a century not to take the party into an election.

On 3 August 2017, Robertson announced he would be resigning from parliament, which became effective on 25 August, to take up a position as executive general manager at Foodbank, a not-for-profit organisation which distributes excess food from retailers to the needy.

== See also ==
- Shadow Ministry of John Robertson

Trade union offices
Preceded by Michael Costa	Secretary of the Labor Council of New South Wales; 2001–2008	Succeeded by Mark Lennon
Political offices
Vacant Title last held by John Della Bosca	Special Minister of State; 2009	Succeeded by Eric Roozendaal
Vacant Title last held by John Della Bosca as Minister Assisting the Premier on Public Sector Management	Minister for Public Sector Reform; 2009–2010	Succeeded by Paul Lynch
Vacant Title last held by Richard Amery	Minister for Corrective Services; 2009	Succeeded by Phil Costa
Preceded by Carmel Tebbutt	Minister for Climate Change and the Environment; 2009	Succeeded by Frank Sartor
Preceded by Ian Macdonald	Minister for Energy; 2009–2010	Succeeded by Paul Lynch
Preceded by Jodi McKay	Minister for Commerce; 2009–2010	Succeeded by Paul Lynch
Preceded by John Hatzistergos	Minister for Industrial Relations; 2009–2010	Succeeded by Paul Lynch
Preceded by Ian Macdonald	Minister for the Central Coast; 2010–2011	Succeeded by Chris Hartcher
Preceded by David Campbell	Minister for Transport; 2010–2011	Succeeded by Gladys Berejiklian
Preceded by Barry O'Farrell	Leader of the Opposition of New South Wales; 2011–2014	Succeeded by Luke Foley
New South Wales Legislative Assembly
Preceded by Paul Gibson	Member for Blacktown; 2011–2017	Succeeded by Stephen Bali
Party political offices
Preceded by Kristina Keneally	Leader of the New South Wales Labor Party; 2011–2014	Succeeded by Luke Foley
