= Jodi McKay =

Australian politician (born 1969)

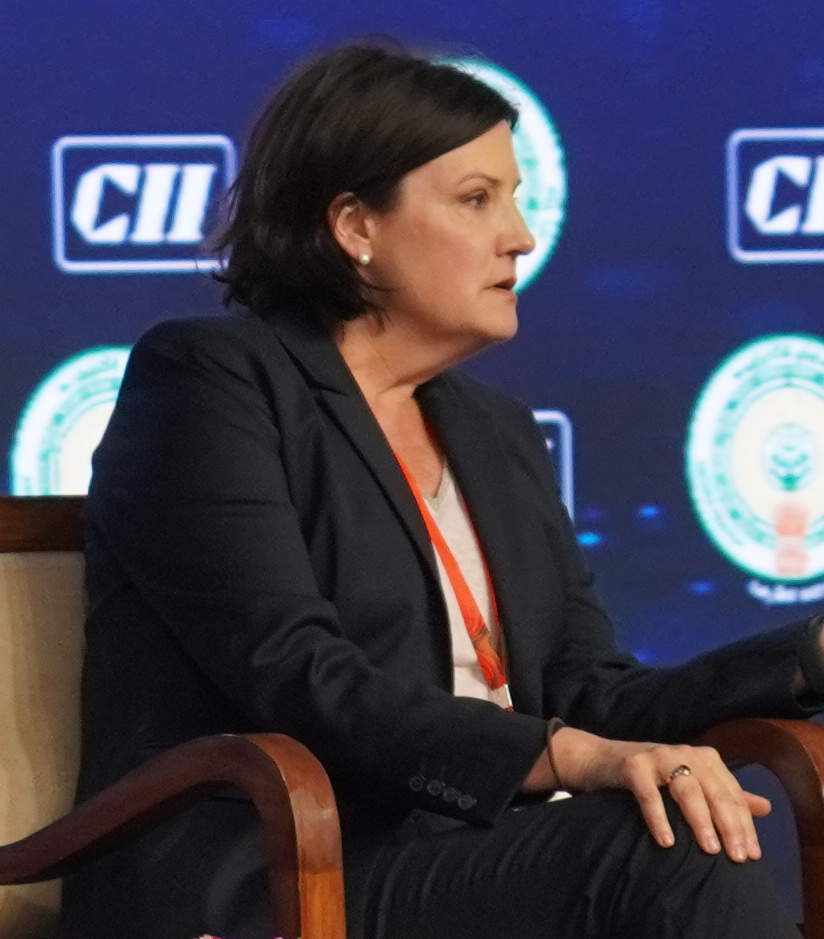

39th Leader of the Opposition in New South Wales
- In office 29 June 2019 – 28 May 2021
- Premier: Gladys Berejiklian
- Deputy: Yasmin Catley
- Preceded by: Michael Daley
- Succeeded by: Chris Minns

Leader of the New South Wales Labor Party
- In office 29 June 2019 – 28 May 2021
- Deputy: Yasmin Catley
- Preceded by: Michael Daley
- Succeeded by: Chris Minns
Ministerial positions
Minister for Tourism
In office 8 September 2008 – 28 March 2011
Premier	Nathan Rees; Kristina Keneally
Preceded by	Matt Brown
Succeeded by	George Souris
Minister for the Hunter
In office 8 September 2008 – 28 March 2011
Premier	Nathan Rees; Kristina Keneally
Preceded by	Michael Costa
Succeeded by	Mike Gallacher
Minister for Science and Medical Research
In office 11 November 2008 – 28 March 2011
Premier	Nathan Rees; Kristina Keneally
Preceded by	Tony Stewart
Succeeded by	Jillian Skinner
Minister for Women
In office 8 December 2008 – 28 March 2011
Premier	Nathan Rees; Kristina Keneally
Preceded by	Verity Firth
Succeeded by	Pru Goward

Member of the New South Wales Parliament for Strathfield
- In office 22 March 2015 – 31 December 2021
- Preceded by: Charles Casuscelli
- Succeeded by: Jason Li
- Majority: 4,274 (5.0%)

Member of the New South Wales Parliament for Newcastle
- In office 24 March 2007 – 26 March 2011
- Preceded by: Bryce Gaudry
- Succeeded by: Tim Owen

Personal details
- Born: 16 August 1969 (age 57) Gloucester, New South Wales
- Party: Labor
- Spouse: Stephen Fenn (m. 2009)
- Profession: Politician; Television journalist
- Website: www.jodimckay.com.au

Jodi Leyanne McKay (born 16 August 1969) is an Australian former politician who was the Leader of the Opposition in the Parliament of New South Wales from June 2019 until May 2021. She previously served as a member of the New South Wales Legislative Assembly, representing Strathfield for the Labor Party from 2015 to 2021. McKay also previously represented Newcastle for one term from 2007 until her defeat at the 2011 election. Between 2008 and 2011, McKay held a number of junior ministerial responsibilities in the Rees and Keneally governments, including serving as the Minister for the Hunter, Tourism, Small Business, Science and Medical Research, Commerce, and Women, and Minister Assisting the Minister for Health (Cancer). On 17 October 2021, McKay announced she would resign from the parliament, which triggered a by-election in her seat of Strathfield. McKay subsequently became National Chair of the Australia India Business Council.

== Early years and background ==
McKay began her career as a journalist, eventually becoming a news anchor for NBN Television. She was among the first Australian news presenters to cover the September 11 attacks in the United States. She later entered the private sector in corporate communications and marketing. McKay also served on the Board of Hunter Medical Research Institute, the University of Newcastle Research Associates and Hunter Manufacturers' Association, prior to entering politics.

== Political career ==
A member of Labor Right, McKay was installed as Labor's candidate for Newcastle over the sitting member Bryce Gaudry, after Premier Morris Iemma intervened to ensure her selection. The controversy around the selection led to around 130 members of the Newcastle ALP branches, then the largest in the state, leaving or being expelled.

The subsequent election became a tight three-way contest between McKay, Gaudry, running as an independent, and the independent Newcastle lord mayor John Tate, with McKay winning on Gaudry's preferences.

In April 2008, the NSW Greens were critical of McKay for failing to declare a political donation from a property developer group, Buildev, owned by Nathan Tinkler, to help pay for printing costs during her campaign. Buildev declared $50,000 in electoral donations to McKay, but McKay only declared a $1,000 donation from Buildev. At the time, Buildev was seeking support from the Minister for Planning, Frank Sartor, for a development at Medowie, near Newcastle Airport. McKay denied knowledge of the donation. The donation was made to Labor's New South Wales head office. In 2011, following a controversial proposal by another Tinkler company, Newcastle Ports, to build a coal loader at the port, McKay declined to meet company representatives, citing her need to remain uninvolved in the process.

In September 2008, McKay was appointed to cabinet as the Minister for Tourism and Minister for the Hunter. She immediately distanced herself from the style of her predecessor Michael Costa, and committed to greater engagement with local government and community groups. Her appointment was welcomed by local tourism and business groups, including the Hunter Chamber of Commerce. McKay was also appointed as the Minister for Science and Medical Research, Minister assisting on Health, Minister for Commerce, Minister for Small Business, and Minister for Women.

In 2011, McKay was reaffirmed as the Labor candidate for Newcastle by the party's national executive. At the 2011 election, McKay recorded a 31.0% share of the primary vote, her Liberal opponent received 36.4%, Tate had 11.5% and the Greens 14.6%. On a two-party preferred basis that translated into 52.4% for the Liberals' Tim Owen and 47.6% for McKay.

In 2014, McKay gave evidence before the Independent Commission Against Corruption (ICAC) that she was asked to accept an alleged bribe and reported the matter to the NSW Police, the ICAC and the Election Funding Authority. McKay told the Independent Commission Against Corruption that Tinkler had offered to bankroll her 2011 election campaign, in exchange for her support of his $1 billion coal loader project. Ms McKay gave evidence that she reported Mr Tinkler's alleged bribe offer to police, ICAC, the Electoral Commission and the Electoral Funding Authority. McKay told him she could not accept his money because he was a banned donor. The ICAC inquiry revealed that after McKay knocked back the alleged bribe, Tinkler's Buildev company, her colleague and senior Labor MP Joe Tripodi, and former Labor staffer Ann Wills, were involved in a pamphlet smear campaign that she believed contributed to her election loss. McKay was in tears in the ICAC witness box as confirmation of what she had long suspected came to light—"they could not control me and they did not want me in the seat."

== Career during political hiatus ==
After her election defeat, McKay held an executive role with Family Planning NSW and was a non-executive director of both Australian Science Innovations and Epilepsy Action Australia.

After the first ICAC hearing, McKay said she would never return to politics. However, in October 2014, McKay was installed as the Labor candidate for the seat of Strathfield for the next state election and, following her endorsement, was quoted as saying that she realised "if you want change, it has to come from within".

In January 2015, although she was not a member of Parliament, leader of the opposition Luke Foley appointed McKay to the shadow ministry as opposition planning spokeswoman.

== Return to politics ==
At the 2015 state election, McKay was elected as the member for Strathfield with an 8.2-point swing to Labor. In April 2015, she was appointed as Shadow Minister for Police and Roads, Maritime and Freight. In 2016, she was promoted to Shadow Minister for Transport and Shadow Minister for Roads, Maritime and Freight. In 2017, she was preselected again as the Labor candidate for Strathfield for the 2019 state election, winning the seat with 55.1% on a two-party-preferred basis.

=== Leader of the Opposition ===
Following Labor's defeat in the 2019 election, the party leader, Michael Daley, resigned, and McKay expressed interest in running for the leadership. A leadership vote was held in June 2019, and McKay was elected as the leader of the NSW Labor Party, defeating Kogarah MP Chris Minns, winning 58.0% of the Labor caucus vote, and 63.0% of rank and file party membership vote. She thereby became the 39th NSW Leader of the Opposition, marking the first time that the premier and opposition leader in New South Wales were both women. McKay revealed her shadow ministry on 3 July 2019.

Following Labor's defeat at the Upper Hunter by-election in May 2021, McKay faced a possible leadership challenge. On 25 May 2021, Shadow Treasurer Walt Secord resigned from her shadow cabinet, saying that it was "well-known that Jodi McKay and [he] have disagreed on key policy, parliamentary and strategic decisions and directions" and that he can no longer serve under her. The following day, a file titled 'Why Chris Minns and Jamie Clements can never run the NSW Labor Party' was circulated from the office of the party deputy leader, Yasmin Catley. Minns, who was the Shadow Minister for Transport, was disappointed with the lack of explanation or communication from McKay and Catley over the file circulation and also resigned from the shadow cabinet. Facing pressure to unite the party, McKay resigned as party leader on 28 May 2021. Minns then became party leader a week later. McKay was offered a frontbench position by Minns in his shadow ministry but she declined.

On 17 October 2021, McKay announced that she had advised the Speaker of the New South Wales Legislative Assembly of her intention to resign as member for Strathfield, which would trigger a by-election to fill the vacancy. She officially resigned on 31 December 2021.

== See also ==
- Shadow Ministry of Jodi McKay

New South Wales Legislative Assembly
Preceded by Bryce Gaudry	Member for Newcastle; 2007–2011	Succeeded by Tim Owen
Preceded by Charles Casuscelli	Member for Strathfield; 2015–2021	Succeeded by Jason Li
Political offices
Preceded by Matt Brown	Minister for Tourism; 2008–2011	Succeeded by George Souris as Minister for Tourism, Major Events, Hospitality and Racing
Preceded by Michael Costa	Minister for the Hunter; 2008–2011	Succeeded by Mike Gallacher
Preceded by Tony Stewart	Minister for Science and Medical Research; 2008–2011	Succeeded by Jillian Skinner as Minister for Medical Research
Preceded by Tony Stewart	Minister Assisting the Minister for Health (Cancer); 2008–2009	Succeeded by Frank Sartor
Preceded by Ian Macdonald	Minister for Small Business; 2008–2009	Succeeded by Steve Whan
Preceded by Verity Firth	Minister for Women; 2008–2011	Succeeded by Pru Goward
Preceded by Carmel Tebbutt	Minister for Commerce; 2009	Succeeded by John Robertson
Preceded by Michael Daley	Leader of the Opposition (New South Wales); 2019–2021	Succeeded by Chris Minns
Party political offices
Preceded by Michael Daley	Leader of the Australian Labor Party (NSW Branch); 2019–2021	Succeeded by Chris Minns
