= Candidates of the 2011 New South Wales state election =

This article provides details on candidates for the 2011 New South Wales state election, which was held on 26 March 2011.

== Retiring Members ==
=== Labor ===
- Marie Andrews MLA (Gosford)
- John Aquilina MLA (Riverstone)
- Diane Beamer MLA (Mulgoa)
- David Campbell MLA (Keira)
- Barry Collier MLA (Miranda)
- Angela D'Amore MLA (Drummoyne)
- Tanya Gadiel MLA (Parramatta)
- Paul Gibson MLA (Blacktown)
- Kerry Hickey MLA (Cessnock)
- Phil Koperberg MLA (Blue Mountains)
- Gerard Martin MLA (Bathurst)
- Grant McBride MLA (The Entrance)
- Lylea McMahon MLA (Shellharbour)
- Alison Megarrity MLA (Menai)
- Frank Sartor MLA (Rockdale)
- Tony Stewart MLA (Bankstown)
- Joe Tripodi MLA (Fairfield)
- Graham West MLA (Campbelltown)
- Tony Catanzariti MLC
- Kayee Griffin MLC
- Christine Robertson MLC
- Ian West MLC

=== Liberal ===
- Peter Debnam MLA (Vaucluse)
- Judy Hopwood MLA (Hornsby)
- Malcolm Kerr MLA (Cronulla)
- Wayne Merton MLA (Baulkham Hills)
- Michael Richardson MLA (Castle Hill)

=== Nationals ===
- John Turner MLA (Myall Lakes)
- Russell Turner MLA (Orange)

=== Greens ===
- Ian Cohen MLC

== Legislative Assembly ==
Sitting members are shown in bold text. Successful candidates are highlighted in the relevant colour. Where there is possible confusion, an asterisk (*) is also used.

Electorate	Held by	Labor candidate	Coalition candidate	Greens candidate	CDP candidate	Other candidates
Albury	Liberal	Darren Cameron	**Greg Aplin** (Lib)	Colin Hesse	Rhonda Avasalu	Stephen Bingle (Dem); Paul Wareham (Ind)
Auburn	Labor	**Barbara Perry**	Ned Attie (Lib)	Michael Kiddle	Raema Walker	Jamal Daoud (Ind); Carolyn Kennett (-); Salim Mehajer (Ind)
Ballina	National	Toby Warnes	**Don Page** (Nat)	Simon Richardson	Bruce Kemp	Karin Kolbe (Ind); Nathan Willis (FFP)
Balmain	Labor	**Verity Firth**	James Falk (Lib)	Jamie Parker	Leeanne Gesling	Nicholas Folkes (Ind); Jon Shapiro (Ind); Maire Sheehan (Ind); Jane Ward (Ind)
Bankstown	Labor	Tania Mihailuk	Bill Chahine (Lib)	Malikeh Michels	Zarif Abdulla	Rebecca Kay (Ind); Richard Phillips (-); Edmond Taouk (Ind)
Barwon	National	Patrick Massarani	**Kevin Humphries** (Nat)	Ian George		
Bathurst	Labor	Dale Turner	Paul Toole (Nat)	Diane Westerhuis		Richard Trounson (Ind)
Baulkham Hills	Liberal	Tony Hay	David Elliott (Lib)	Mick Hollins	Kaia Thorpe	
Bega	Liberal	Leanne Atkinson	**Andrew Constance** (Lib)	Harriett Swift	Ursula Bennett	Ivan McKay (Ind)
Blacktown	Labor	John Robertson	Karlo Siljeg (Lib)	Paul Taylor	Bernie Gesling	Greg Coulter (Ind); Louise Kedwell (Ind); Wayne Olling (SOS)
Blue Mountains	Labor	Trish Doyle	Roza Sage (Lib)	Kerrin O'Grady	Merv Cox	Janet Mays (Ind)
Burrinjuck	National	Luna Zivadinovic	**Katrina Hodgkinson** (Nat)	Iain Fyfe	Ann Woods	
Cabramatta	Labor	**Nick Lalich**	Dai Le (Lib)	Daniel Griffiths	Peter Tadros	
Camden	Labor	**Geoff Corrigan**	Chris Patterson (Lib)	Danica Sajn	Colin Broadbridge	Domenic Zappia (FFP)
Campbelltown	Labor	Nick Bleasdale	Bryan Doyle (Lib)	Victoria Waldron Hahn	David Wright	Chimezie Kingsley (Ind)
Canterbury	Labor	**Linda Burney**	Ken Nam (Lib)	Marc Rerceretnam	Albert Fam	
Castle Hill	Liberal	Ryan Tracey	Dominic Perrottet (Lib)	Alex Wallbank	Aileen Mountifield	Ari Katsoulas (FFP); Aaron Mendham (Ind)
Cessnock	Labor	Clayton Barr	Alison Davey (Nat)	James Ryan	Wayne Riley	Allan McCudden (Ind); Allan Stapleford (Ind); Dale Troy (Ind)
Charlestown	Labor	**Matthew Morris**	Andrew Cornwell (Lib)	Paula Morrow	Steven Camilleri	Bruce Foley (FFP); Barry Johnston (Ind); Arjay Martin (Ind); Ben McMullen (Ind); Craig Oaten (FP); Adrian Schofield (Ind)
Clarence	National	Colin Clague	**Steve Cansdell** (Nat)	Janet Cavanaugh	Bethany Camac	Kristen Bromell (FFP); Richie Williamson (Ind)
Coffs Harbour	National	David Quinn	**Andrew Fraser** (Nat)	Rodney Degens	Deborah Lions	Paul Templeton (Ind)
Coogee	Labor	**Paul Pearce**	Bruce Notley-Smith (Lib)	Sue Doran	Andrew McGowan	Stuart Burney (Ind); Nathan Jones (Ind)
Cronulla	Liberal	Stefanie Jones	Mark Speakman (Lib)	Josh Peacock	Beth Smith	Patricia Poulos (Ind)
Davidson	Liberal	Mathew Gilliland	**Jonathan O'Dea** (Lib)	John Davis	Peter Chapman	Helen Owen (Ind)
Drummoyne	Labor	Angelo Tsirekas	John Sidoti (Lib)	Adam Butler	Marc Gesling	Alex Elliott (Ind)
Dubbo	Independent	Andrew Brooks	Troy Grant (Nat)	Matt Parmeter		**Dawn Fardell** (Ind)
East Hills	Labor	**Alan Ashton**	Glenn Brookes (Lib)	Susan Roberts	Mark Falanga	Tony Batch (Ind); Stan Hurley (FFP); Boutros Zalloua (Ind)
Epping	Liberal	Amy Smith	**Greg Smith** (Lib)	Emma Heyde	John Kingsmill	John Thomas (FFP); Victor Waterson (Ind)
Fairfield	Labor	Guy Zangari	Charbel Saliba (Lib)	Annie Nielsen	Eileen Nasr	Ahmad Al-Yasiry (Ind); David Ball (Ind); Linda Harris (-); Daicy Olaya (SA)
Gosford	Labor	Katie Smith	Chris Holstein (Lib)	Peter Freewater	Ann-Marie Kitchener	Patrick Aiken (Ind); Jake Cassar (Ind)
Goulburn	Liberal	Crystal Validakis	**Pru Goward** (Lib)	Maree Byrne	Adrian van der Byl	Robert Parker (Ind)
Granville	Labor	**David Borger**	Tony Issa (Lib)	Richard Kennedy	Alex Sharah	Paul Garrard (Ind)
Hawkesbury	Liberal	Peter Wicks	**Ray Williams** (Lib)	Leigh Williams	Muriel Sultana	
Heathcote	Labor	**Paul McLeay**	Lee Evans (Lib)	Phil Smith	Chris Atlee	Peter Bussa (Ind); Greg Petty (Ind)
Heffron	Labor	**Kristina Keneally**	Patrice Pandeleos (Lib)	Mehreen Faruqi	Katalin Ferrier	John Forster (Ind); Trevor Rowe (-)
Hornsby	Liberal	Nicholas Car	Matt Kean (Lib)	Toni Wright-Turner	Leighton Thew	Nick Berman (Ind); Mick Gallagher (Ind)
Keira	Labor	Ryan Park	John Dorahy (Lib)	George Takacs	Steven Avasalu	Paola Harvey (SA); Ray Jaeger (Ind)
Kiama	Labor	**Matt Brown**	Gareth Ward (Lib)	Ben van der Wijngaart	Steve Ryan	Adrian Daly (Ind); Sandra McCarthy (Ind)
Kogarah	Labor	**Cherie Burton**	Miray Hindi (Lib)	Simone Francis	Joseph Abdel Massih	
Ku-ring-gai	Liberal	David Armstrong	**Barry O'Farrell** (Lib)	Susie Gemmell	Witold Wiszniewski	William Bourke (SOS); Alexander Gutman (ORP)
Lake Macquarie	Independent	Marcus Mariani	John McDonald (Lib)	Charmian Eckersley	Kim Gritten	**Greg Piper** (Ind)
Lakemba	Labor	**Robert Furolo**	Michael Hawatt (Lib)	Linda Eisler	Sungjae Kam	Omar Quiader (Ind)
Lane Cove	Liberal	Mario Tsang	**Anthony Roberts** (Lib)	Keith McIlroy	Esther Heng	
Lismore	National	Andrew Moy	**Thomas George** (Nat)	Susan Stock	Margaret Kay	Russell Kilarney (Ind)
Liverpool	Labor	**Paul Lynch**	Mazhar Hadid (Lib)	Signe Westerberg	Matt Attia	Michael Byrne (Ind)
Londonderry	Labor	**Allan Shearan**	Bart Bassett (Lib)	Peta Holmes	Caroline Fraser	Steven Said (FFP)
Macquarie Fields	Labor	**Andrew McDonald**	Sam Eskaros (Lib)	Bill Cashman	Joshua Green	Mick Allen (Ind); Nola Fraser (Ind); Simon McCaffrey (-)
Maitland	Labor	**Frank Terenzini**	Robyn Parker (Lib)	John Brown	Anna Balfour	Kellie Tranter (Ind)
Manly	Liberal	Jennifer Jary	**Mike Baird** (Lib)	Ian Hehir	Timothy Wainwright	
Maroubra	Labor	**Michael Daley**	Michael Feneley (Lib)	Murray Matson	Jacquie Shiha	
Marrickville	Labor	**Carmel Tebbutt**	Rosana Tyler (Lib)	Fiona Byrne	Kylie Laurence	James Cogan (-); Pip Hinman (SA); Jimmy Liem (FFP); Paul Quealy (Ind)
Menai	Labor	Peter Scaysbrook	Melanie Gibbons (Lib)	Simone Morrissey	Lindsay Johnson	Jim McGoldrick (Ind)
Miranda	Labor	Therese Cook	Graham Annesley (Lib)	Naomi Waizer	Ern Hemmings	John Brett (Ind)
Monaro	Labor	**Steve Whan**	John Barilaro (Nat)	Paul Cockram	Deanne Graf	Kingsley Warburton (Ind)
Mount Druitt	Labor	**Richard Amery**	Venus Priest (Lib)	Debbie Robertson	Dave Vincent	
Mulgoa	Labor	Prue Guillaume	Tanya Davies (Lib)	Patrick Darley-Jones	Luke Portelli	Emily Dunn (-); Tony Robinson (Ind)
Murray-Darling	National	Neville Gasmier	**John Williams** (Nat)	Heidi Hendry		
Murrumbidgee	National	William Wood	**Adrian Piccoli** (Nat)	George Benedyka	Fiona Bushby	
Myall Lakes	National	David Petroulakis	Stephen Bromhead (Nat)	Greg Smith		Steve Attkins (Ind); Barry Wright (Ind)
Newcastle	Labor	**Jodi McKay**	Tim Owen (Lib)	John Sutton	Milton Caine	Zane Alcorn (SA); Noel Holt (-); Rod Noble (Ind); John Tate (Ind)
North Shore	Liberal	Tabitha Winton	**Jillian Skinner** (Lib)	Andrew Robjohns	David Kelly	
Northern Tablelands	Independent	Sarah Frazier	Charlie McCowen (Nat)	Pat Schultz	Isabel Strutt	**Richard Torbay** (Ind)
Oatley	Labor	**Kevin Greene**	Mark Coure (Lib)	Anne Wagstaff	Steven Marcos	
Orange	National	Kevin Duffy	Andrew Gee (Nat)	Stephen Nugent		John Davis (Ind); Fiona Rossiter (FFP)
Oxley	National	Joe Blackshield	**Andrew Stoner** (Nat)	Jeremy Bradley	John Klose	Marcus Aussie-Stone (Ind); Richard McGovern (Ind)
Parramatta	Labor	Pierre Esber	Geoff Lee (Lib)	Phil Bradley	Peter Magee	Robert Aiken (-); Thomas Katsoulas (FFP); Michael McDermott (Ind); Kon Paraskevopoulos (Ind); Duncan Roden (SA)
Penrith	Liberal	John Thain	**Stuart Ayres** (Lib)	Suzie Wright	Andrew Green	Joaquim de Lima (ORP)
Pittwater	Liberal	Pat Boydell	**Rob Stokes** (Lib)	Jonathan King	Mark McFarlane	
Port Macquarie	Independent	Peter Alley	Leslie Williams (Nat)	Drusi Megget	Robert Waldron	**Peter Besseling** (Ind)
Port Stephens	Liberal	Kate Washington	**Craig Baumann** (Lib)	Liz Stephens	Julian Grayson	Paul Hennelly (FP); Christopher Stokes (FFP)
Riverstone	Labor	Michael Vassili	Kevin Conolly (Lib)	Jess Harwood	Allan Green	Geno Belcastro (Ind); Rosarie Bonham (Ind); Jason Cornelius (FFP); Tony Pettitt (-)
Rockdale	Labor	Steve Kamper	John Flowers (Lib)	Lauren Moore	Anita Strezova	Michael Nagi (Ind)
Ryde	Liberal	Jerome Laxale	**Victor Dominello** (Lib)	Jimmy Shaw	Julie Worsley	Vic Tagg (Ind)
Shellharbour	Labor	Anna Watson	Larissa Mallinson (Lib)	Peter Moran	Jeff Dakers	
Smithfield	Labor	**Ninos Khoshaba**	Andrew Rohan (Lib)	Astrid O'Neill	Manny Poularas	
South Coast	Liberal	Glenn Sims	**Shelley Hancock** (Lib)	Amanda Findley	Bohdan Brumerskyj	
Strathfield	Labor	**Virginia Judge**	Charles Casuscelli (Lib)	Lance Dale	Bill Shailer	Mark Sharma (Ind)
Swansea	Labor	**Robert Coombs**	Garry Edwards (Lib)	Phillipa Parsons	Noreen Tibbey	Gillian Sneddon (Ind)
Sydney	Independent	Sacha Blumen	Adrian Bartels (Lib)	De Brierley Newton	Peter Madden	**Clover Moore*** (Ind); Andrew Patterson (-); Victor Shen (FP)
Tamworth	Independent	Paul Hobbs	Kevin Anderson (Nat)	Dheera Smith		**Peter Draper** (Ind); Tony Gibson (Ind)
Terrigal	Liberal	Trevor Drake	**Chris Hartcher** (Lib)	Dougal Anderson	Carmen Darley-Bentley	Michelle Meares (Ind); Ian Sutton (Ind)
The Entrance	Labor	David Mehan	Chris Spence (Lib)	Deidrie Jinks	Bob Mirovic	James Bond (FFP)
Toongabbie	Labor	**Nathan Rees**	Kirsty Lloyd (Lib)	Len Hobbs	Brendon Prentice	Peter Johnson (SFP); Ashok Kumar (Ind); Michele Read (Ind)
Tweed	National	Reece Byrnes	**Geoff Provest** (Nat)	Andrea Vickers	Corinne Pennay	
Upper Hunter	National	Michael Gibbons	**George Souris** (Nat)	Chris Parker	Fred Cowley	Tim Duddy (Ind)
Vaucluse	Liberal	Pauline Neill	Gabrielle Upton (Lib)	Susan Jarnason	Beresford Thomas	
Wagga Wagga	Liberal	Glenn Elliott-Rudder	**Daryl Maguire** (Lib)	Ros Prangnell	Sylvia Mulholland	Joe McGirr (Ind)
Wakehurst	Liberal	Linda Beattie	**Brad Hazzard** (Lib)	Conny Harris	Peter Colsell	
Wallsend	Labor	**Sonia Hornery**	Chris Dolan (Lib)	Keith Parsons	Andrew Weatherstone	Ray Broderick (FFP); Shayne Connell (Ind); Michael Jackson (Ind)
Willoughby	Liberal	Chris Simpson	**Gladys Berejiklian** (Lib)	Robert McDougall	Philip Brown	
Wollondilly	Labor	**Phil Costa**	Jai Rowell (Lib)	Jess di Blasio	Chris Dalton	Judy Hannan (Ind); Clinton Mead (ORP)
Wollongong	Labor	**Noreen Hay**	Michelle Blicavs (Lib)	Brendan Cook	Clarrie Pratt	Gordon Bradbery (Ind); Jim Clabour (Ind)
Wyong	Labor	**David Harris**	Darren Webber (Lib)	Sue Wynn	Roger Fernandez	

== Legislative Council ==
Sitting members are shown in bold text. Tickets that elected at least one MLC are highlighted in the relevant colour. Successful candidates are identified by an asterisk (*).

Labor candidates	Coalition candidates	Greens candidates	CDP candidates	SFP candidates
1. **Eric Roozendaal***; 2. **Greg Donnelly***; 3. **Penny Sharpe***; 4. **Peter Primrose***; 5. **Tony Kelly***; 6. Andrew Ferguson; 7. Natalie Bradbury; 8. Ernest Wong; 9. Nizza Siano; 10. Sue Fletcher; 11. Alexandra Cowan; 12. Richard Smolenski; 13. Glenn Kolomeitz; 14. Michelle Miran; 15. Anna Minns; 16. John Knight; 17. John Rumble; 18. Kien Ly	1. **Mike Gallacher*** (Lib); 2. **Duncan Gay*** (Nat); 3. **Greg Pearce*** (Lib); 4. **David Clarke*** (Lib); 5. **Rick Colless*** (Nat); 6. Scot MacDonald* (Lib); 7. **Catherine Cusack*** (Lib); 8. Natasha Maclaren-Jones* (Lib); 9. Peter Phelps* (Lib); 10. Niall Blair* (Nat); 11. Sarah Johnston* (Nat); 12. Henson Liang (Lib); 13. Andy Heath (Lib); 14. Lili Gestakovska (Lib); 15. Ben Tyson (Nat)	1. **David Shoebridge***; 2. Jan Barham*; 3. Jeremy Buckingham*; 4. Lesa de Leau; 5. Chris Harris; 6. Brami Jegatheeswaran; 7. Terri Latella; 8. Brian Mason; 9. Lynne Saville; 10. Leonard Chin; 11. Catherine Moore; 12. Bronislava Lee; 13. Alex Surace; 14. Anne Marett; 15. Anthony Petrolo; 16. Jan Davis; 17. Melissa Brooks; 18. Jason Koh; 19. Pauline Tyrrell; 20. Joel Macrae; 21. Sandra Heilpern	1. Paul Green*; 2. Robyn Peebles; 3. Graham Freemantle; 4. Max Cracknell; 5. Elaine Nile; 6. Magdi Hanna; 7. Ian Smith; 8. Elwyn Sheppard; 9. David Fraser; 10. Anita Bird; 11. Eddie Cropper; 12. Michelle Green; 13. Trisha Ellis; 14. Devon Chapman; 15. Graeme Young; 16. Bruce Watson; 17. Diana Thew; 18. Gamil Helmy-Kostandy; 19. Soon-Hyung Kwon; 20. Ula Falanga	1. **Robert Brown***; 2. Jim Muirhead; 3. Max Castle; 4. Pauline Smith; 5. Tony McManus; 6. Al McGlashan; 7. Col Allison; 8. John Featherstone; 9. Steve Lee; 10. Alain Noujaim; 11. Kath Clapham; 12. Arthur Baker; 13. Darren Higgins; 14. Karl Houseman; 15. Peter Saunders; 16. Ron Wakem; 17. David Cook; 18. Bob Shaw
Family First candidates	Democrats candidates	ORP candidates	Socialist candidates	Fishing candidates
1. **Gordon Moyes**; 2. Phil Lamb; 3. Gregory Swane; 4. Joseph Mack; 5. Ken Duncan; 6. John Millard; 7. Sam Habashy; 8. Graham Guy; 9. Richard Menteith; 10. Nett Knox; 11. Grace Sham; 12. Nancy Piggott; 13. Patricia Giles; 14. Arnold Gorrell; 15. Wayne Koivu; 16. Ken Scott; 17. Gavin Brett; 18. Johnny Teong; 19. Rejieli Flexman	1. Arthur Chesterfield-Evans; 2. Ronaldo Villaver; 3. Dean Winter; 4. Glenn Luxford; 5. Brett Paterson; 6. Casey Balk; 7. Pamela Clifford; 8. Robert McFarlane; 9. Perry Garofani; 10. Carolyn Hastie; 11. John Haydon; 12. Georgina Johanson; 13. Mayo Materazzo; 14. Julia Melland; 15. David Robinson; 16. Carol Prendergast; 17. Jaime Serpanchy; 18. Samantha Elliott-Halls	1. David Leyonhjelm; 2. Peter Whelan; 3. Martin Walsh; 4. Fay Destry; 5. Ian Best; 6. James Whelan; 7. Jennifer Rose; 8. John Phibbs; 9. Bob Hennessy; 10. Angelique Pettett; 11. Virginia Kruse; 12. Lucy Gabb; 13. Jason Kent; 14. Graham Nickols; 15. Robert Dolphin; 16. Janos Beregszaszi	1. Peter Boyle; 2. Jess Moore; 3. Luis Almario; 4. Susan Price; 5. Ibrahim Barssi; 6. Bea Bleile; 7. Raul Bassi; 8. Simon Cunich; 9. Rachel Evans; 10. Ross Geary; 11. John Coleman; 12. Steve O'Brien; 13. Kate Ausburn; 14. Patrick Harrison; 15. Federico Fuentes; 16. Luis Olaya; 17. Jill Hickson; 18. Duroyan Fertl; 19. Stefan Skibicki; 20. Terry Townsend; 21. Simon Butler	1. Bob Smith; 2. Elizabeth Stocker; 3. Chris Goodbar; 4. Deanne Shepherd; 5. Russell Bond; 6. Bob Sieber; 7. Ted Mackay; 8. Vicki Johns; 9. Stewart Paterson; 10. Kevin Johnson; 11. Brian Sutton; 12. Alison Johnstone; 13. Paul Derrick; 14. Adrian Callaghan; 15. Michael O'Connor; 16. Frank Bills; 17. Craig McCartney; 18. Margaret Hare; 19. Rowan Phelps; 20. David Hitchcock; 21. Matthew Small
Save Our State candidates	BAP candidates	NPMP candidates	RWRP candidates	Hanson candidates
1. Tony Recsei; 2. Monica Wangmann; 3. Gordon Hocking; 4. Ted Webber; 5. Jean Posen; 6. John Ward; 7. Barry Hadaway; 8. Colin Freeman; 9. Rosemary Hadaway; 10. Tony Meaney; 11. Tanya Wood; 12. Margaretha van Gennip; 13. Jennifer Bennett; 14. Pat Cameron; 15. Mary Minns; 16. Allan Butt; 17. Hugh Knox; 18. Robert Hochmann	1. Ray Brown; 2. Michael O'Donnell; 3. Liz Tomlinson; 4. John Fransen; 5. Maureen Riordan; 6. Alan Smith; 7. Louise Williams; 8. Ross Trovato; 9. Shiyun Chen; 10. John Zhang; 11. Kieron Farrell; 12. John Baiada; 13. Domenic Cammareri; 14. John White; 15. Robert Pickett; 16. John Vellenga; 17. Brett Walter; 18. Ron Gattone	1. Charles Matthews; 2. Robert Morris; 3. David Johnson; 4. Sirena Beveridge; 5. Troy Seelin; 6. Caroline Schlee; 7. Dale Ayshford; 8. Helen Patterson; 9. Robert Braid; 10. Joyce McDonnell; 11. Kevin Barron; 12. John Fleming; 13. Michael Morrisey; 14. Susan Bisaro; 15. John Shaw; 16. Louise Morrisey; 17. Carol Matthews; 18. Carolyn Beveridge	1. Barry Gissell; 2. Clifford Walford; 3. Amanda Goodwin; 4. Jody Gissell; 5. Toni Griffis; 6. Peter Squires; 7. Anthony Adams; 8. Donna Adams; 9. Irene Wilson; 10. Maureen Cross; 11. Amanda Radburn; 12. Yvonne King; 13. David McCabe; 14. Kelly Slater; 15. Rodney Slater	1. Pauline Hanson; 2. Brian Burston; 3. Graham Abel; 4. Kate McCulloch; 5. David Taylor; 6. Alan Cronin; 7. Michael Parsons; 8. Rosalyn Wright; 9. John Cantwell; 10. Ed Farnsworth; 11. Sharon Elwell; 12. Andy Frew; 13. David Seccombe; 14. Stephen Mulcahy; 15. Kenneth Dibsdale; 16. Bev Wallis
Hatton candidates	Ungrouped candidates			
1. John Hatton; 2. Ian Scandrett; 3. John McInerney; 4. Tony Brown; 5. David Swan; 6. Mike King; 7. Debra Wales; 8. Sandra Wilson; 9. Peter Cipollone; 10. Joe Nagy; 11. Dianne Allen; 12. Edgar Azzopardi; 13. Julie Head; 14. Darren Boehm; 15. Deborah Richards; 16. Chris Gibson; 17. John Stephens; 18. Alan Hunt; 19. Lindsay Fuller; 20. Mark Corrigan; 21. Meg Bishop	Stuart Baanstra; Lindsay Bignell; Huw Campbell; Phil Douglas; June Esposito; Alan Francis; Danny Lim; James Liu; Kyrsty Macdonald; Bruce Manefield; Darren Marton; Frank Monte; Ramsay Nuthall; Robert Peake; Ben Smith; Richard Stanton; Jennifer Stefanac; John Tullis			

== Unregistered parties and groups ==
Some parties and groups that did not qualify for registration with the New South Wales Electoral Commission nevertheless endorsed candidates, who appeared on the ballot papers as independent or unaffiliated candidates.

- The Socialist Equality Party endorsed Carolyn Kennett in Auburn, Richard Phillips in Bankstown, James Cogan in Marrickville and Noel Holt in Newcastle.
- The Democratic Labor Party endorsed Boutros Zalloua in East Hills, Simon McCaffrey in Macquarie Fields and Emily Dunn in Mulgoa.
- The Australian Sex Party endorsed Andrew Patterson in Sydney and Huw Campbell in the Legislative Council.
- The Australia First Party endorsed Tony Robinson in Mulgoa and Tony Pettitt in Riverstone.
- The Australian Protectionist Party endorsed Nicholas Folkes in Balmain.
- The Social Justice Network endorsed co-founder Jamal Daoud in Auburn, Ahmad Al-Yasiry in Fairfield, and Omar Quiader in Lakemba.
- The Communist League endorsed Linda Harris in Fairfield and Robert Aiken in Parramatta.
- Rod Noble in Newcastle was the national president of the Progressive Labour Party.
- The Australian Progress Party, which advocates abolition of the states, endorsed Bruce Manefield in the Legislative Council.
- "Help Fix NSW" endorsed Robert Peake in the Legislative Council.
- "United We Stand" endorsed Michelle Meares in Terrigal and Ben Smith in the Legislative Council.
- Independent Legislative Council candidate John Hatton endorsed independent candidates for the Legislative Assembly under the name "John Hatton's Independent Team". These candidates were Alex Elliott in Drummoyne, Robert Parker in Goulburn, Greg Petty in Heathcote, Kellie Tranter in Maitland, Michael McDermott in Parramatta, Richard McGovern in Oxley, Joe McGirr in Wagga Wagga and Judy Hannan in Wollondilly.
- Independent federal MP Rob Oakeshott endorsed Steve Attkins in Myall Lakes, Richard McGovern in Oxley and Tim Duddy in Upper Hunter.
