= O'Farrell shadow ministry =

The shadow ministry of Barry O'Farrell was the opposition led by Barry O'Farrell MLA, opposing the Iemma, Rees and Keneally governments of the Labor Party in the Parliament of New South Wales. The shadow cabinet was made up of members of the Liberal Party and the National Party of Australia in a Coalition agreement.

O'Farrell led from the majority Coalition partner, the Liberal Party and served as leader of the opposition from 4 April 2007 until the 2011 state election. The deputy leader of the shadow ministry during this period was Andrew Stoner MLA from the minority Coalition partner, the National Party. The leader of the opposition in the Legislative Council was Mike Gallacher MLC from the Liberal Party and the deputy leader of the Legislative Council was Duncan Gay MLC from the National Party.

== Final arrangement ==
=== Shadow ministers from the Legislative Assembly ===
Shadow Ministerial Portfolio	Shadow Minister
Leader of the Opposition; Leader of the Liberal Party; Shadow Minister for Western Sydney	Barry O'Farrell
Leader of the National Party; Shadow Minister for Roads, Ports and State Development	Andrew Stoner
Deputy Leader of the Liberal Party; Deputy Leader of the Opposition; Shadow Minister for Health	Jillian Skinner
Deputy Leader of the Nationals; Shadow Minister for Education and Youth Affairs	Adrian Piccoli
Shadow Treasurer	Mike Baird
Shadow Minister for Planning and Infrastructure	Brad Hazzard
Shadow Minister for Inter-Government Relations, Special Minister for State and the Central Coast	Chris Hartcher
Shadow Minister for Hospitality, Tourism, Racing and Major Events	George Souris
Shadow Minister for Transport	Gladys Berejiklian
Shadow Minister for Small Business and Regulatory Reform and Shadow Minister for the North Coast	Don Page
Shadow Minister for Aging and Disability Services	Andrew Constance
Shadow Minister for Natural Resource Management	Katrina Hodgkinson
Shadow Minister for Fair Trading	Greg Aplin
Shadow Attorney General and for Justice	Greg Smith
Shadow Minister for Women and Community Services	Pru Goward
Shadow Minister for Citizenship, Voluenteering and the Arts	Anthony Roberts
Shadow Minister for Aboriginal Affairs, Healthy Lifestyles and for Western New South Wales	Kevin Humphries

=== Shadow ministers from the Legislative Council ===
Shadow Ministerial Portfolio	Shadow Minister
Leader of the Opposition in the Upper Legislative Council, Shadow Minister for Police and the Hunter	Mike Gallacher
Deputy Leader of the Opposition in the Legislative Council; Shadow Minister for Industry	Duncan Gay
Shadow Minister for Finance, Housing Strategy, Industrial Relations and Shadow Minister for the Illawarra	Greg Pearce
Shadow Minister for Climate Change and Environmental Sustainability	Catherine Cusack
Shadow Minister for Emergency Services	Melinda Pavey

== See also ==
- 2011 New South Wales state election
- O'Farrell ministry
- Iemma ministry (2007–08)
- Keneally ministry
- Rees ministry
