= Rob Stokes =

Australian politician (born 1974)

The Honourable Rob Stokes
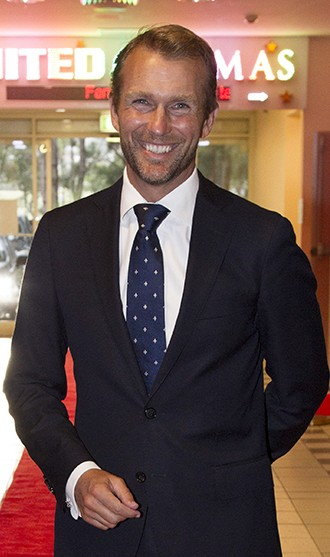
- Stokes in 2014

Minister for Infrastructure
- In office 21 December 2021 – 25 March 2023
- Premier: Dominic Perrottet
- Preceded by: himself (as Minister for Planning and Public Spaces)
- Succeeded by: Anoulack Chanthivong (Note: As Minister for Building)

Minister for Cities
- In office 21 December 2021 – 25 March 2023
- Premier: Dominic Perrottet
- Preceded by: himself (as Minister for Planning and Public Spaces)
- Succeeded by: Anthony Roberts (Note: As Minister for Planning)

Minister for Active Transport
- In office 21 December 2021 – 25 March 2023
- Premier: Dominic Perrottet
- Preceded by: himself (as Minister for Transport and Roads)
- Succeeded by: David Elliott (Note: As Minister for Transport)

Minister for Planning and Public Spaces
- In office 2 April 2019 – 21 December 2021
- Premier: Gladys Berejiklian; Dominic Perrottet
- Preceded by: Anthony Roberts (as Minister for Planning)
- Succeeded by: Anthony Roberts (as Minister for Planning); himself (as Minister for Infrastructure and as Minister for Cities)

Minister for Transport and Roads
- In office 6 October 2021 – 21 December 2021
- Premier: Dominic Perrottet
- Preceded by: Andrew Constance
- Succeeded by: David Elliott (as Minister for Transport); Natalie Ward (as Minister for Metropolitan Roads); himself (as Minister for Active Transport)

Minister for Education
- In office 30 January 2017 – 23 March 2019
- Premier: Gladys Berejiklian
- Preceded by: Adrian Piccoli
- Succeeded by: Sarah Mitchell (as Minister for Education and Early Childhood Learning)

Minister for Planning
- In office 2 April 2015 – 30 January 2017
- Premier: Mike Baird
- Preceded by: Pru Goward
- Succeeded by: Anthony Roberts

Minister for the Environment
- In office 23 April 2014 – 2 April 2015
- Premier: Mike Baird
- Preceded by: Robyn Parker
- Succeeded by: Mark Speakman

Minister for Heritage
- In office 23 April 2014 – 2 April 2015
- Premier: Mike Baird
- Preceded by: Robyn Parker
- Succeeded by: Mark Speakman

Assistant Minister for Planning
- In office 23 April 2014 – 2 April 2015
- Premier: Mike Baird
- Preceded by: new title
- Succeeded by: Mark Speakman

Minister for the Central Coast
- In office 6 May 2014 – 2 April 2015
- Premier: Mike Baird
- Preceded by: Mike Gallacher
- Succeeded by: Scot MacDonald (Note: As Parliamentary Secretary for Planning and the Central Coast)

Member of the New South Wales Parliament for Pittwater
- In office 24 March 2007 – 25 March 2023
- Preceded by: Alex McTaggart
- Succeeded by: Rory Amon

Personal details
- Born: Robert Gordon Stokes; 17 January 1975 (age 51)
- Party: Liberal Party
- Education: Macquarie University
- Occupation: Planner

Robert Gordon Stokes (born 17 January 1975) is an Australian former politician. Stokes served as the New South Wales Minister for Infrastructure, the Minister for Cities, and the Minister for Active Transport in the Perrottet ministry between 21 December 2021 and 25 March 2023. He was a member of the New South Wales Legislative Assembly representing Pittwater for the Liberal Party between 2007 and 2023.

Stokes has previously served as the Minister for Infrastructure in the second Berejiklian ministry between April 2019 and December 2021; and temporarily served as the Minister for Transport and Roads in the Perrottet ministry between October and December 2021. He has also previously served as the Minister for Education from January 2017 until March 2019 in the First Berejiklian ministry; the Minister for the Environment, the Minister for Heritage, the Assistant Minister for Planning, and the Minister for the Central Coast during 2014 and 2015 in the first Baird government; and the Minister for Planning from April 2015 until January 2017 in the second Baird government.

== Background and early career ==
Stokes grew up in Mona Vale. He attended fee-paying Sydney Church of England Grammar School (Shore) and obtained his Higher School Certificate in 1991. He obtained a Bachelor of Arts, a Bachelor of Laws, a Master of Laws and a PhD at Macquarie University; a Diploma of Biblical Studies, and a Graduate Diploma in Legal Practice.

Stokes was an associate with the law firm David Begg & Associates in Martin Place, Sydney. He also worked in a number of other legal firms including one at Mona Vale. He subsequently became a lecturer in the Division of Law at Macquarie University. He became a member of the Young Lawyers Association of New South Wales and was a member of both the Environmental Law and CLE Committees. He became a presidential nominee in 2004 and was elected to Executive Council at the 2004 Annual Assembly.

== Political career ==
Stokes was a policy adviser to Liberal Opposition Leader John Brogden, the Member for Pittwater. When Brogden resigned in controversial circumstances, the 2005 by-election was won by independent candidate Alex McTaggart in what many described as a shock result. Pittwater had long been reckoned as a classic "blue ribbon" Liberal seat. Less than two years later, Stokes regained the seat for the Liberals at the 2007 general election. He won the seat with 50.3 per cent of the primary vote, just over the 50 per cent threshold required to win the seat outright, and 59.4 per cent of the vote on a two-party preferred basis.

After the election, Stokes established his electorate office in Mona Vale. Stokes paid tribute to Brogden in his inaugural speech to the NSW Parliament on 31 May 2007.

At the 2011 general election, Stokes was re-elected with a swing of 21.7 points, gaining 84.5 per cent of the two-party vote. Stokes' main competitor was the Greens Jonathan King. Following the election, Stokes was appointed as NSW Parliamentary Secretary for Renewable Energy in the O'Farrell government.

Owing to the resignation of Barry O'Farrell as Premier, and the subsequent ministerial reshuffle by Mike Baird, the new Liberal Leader, Stokes was appointed as Minister for the Environment, Minister for Heritage, and Assistant Minister for Planning and appointed as a member of cabinet. Two weeks later, following the resignation of Mike Gallacher, Stokes was appointed as Minister for the Central Coast. Following the 2015 state election, Stokes was sworn in as the Minister for Planning on 2 April 2015 in the second Baird government. Following the resignation of Mike Baird as Premier, Gladys Berejiklian was elected as Liberal leader and sworn in as Premier. The first Berejiklian ministry was subsequently formed with Stokes sworn in as the Minister for Education with effect from 30 January 2017. Following the 2019 state election Stokes was appointed as the Minister for Planning and Public Spaces in the second Berejiklian ministry, with effect from 2 April 2019. Following the October 2021 resignation of Andrew Constance from the ministry, Stokes was sworn in as Minister for Transport and Roads, a position that he held, together with Planning and Public Spaces until December 2021. In the second rearrangement of the Perrottet ministry, Stokes was sworn in as Minister for Infrastructure, Minister for Cities, and Minister for Active Transport, with effect from December 2021.

== After politics ==
In May 2023, Stokes was appointed to the federal government's Urban Policy Forum.

In August 2023, Stokes assumed the role of Chair at Faith Housing Alliance.

In March 2024, Stokes was made an industry professor of environment and sustainability at Macquarie University.

In May 2024, Stokes received an honorary doctorate from the University of Technology Sydney.

In December 2024, Stokes was appointed to the board of Museums of History NSW.

In June 2025, Stokes assumed the position of Group Executive – Housing at Anglicare.

== See also ==
- First Baird ministry
- Second Baird ministry
- First Berejiklian ministry
- Second Berejiklian ministry
- Perrottet ministry

== Notes ==
New South Wales Legislative Assembly
Preceded by Alex McTaggart	Member for Pittwater; 2007–2023	Succeeded by Rory Amon
Political offices
Preceded by Robyn Parker	Minister for the Environment; 2014–2015	Succeeded by Mark Speakman
Preceded by Robyn Parker	Minister for Heritage; 2014–2015	Succeeded by Mark Speakman
New title	Assistant Minister for Planning; 2014–2015	Succeeded by Mark Speakman
Preceded by Mike Gallacher	Minister for the Central Coast; 2014–2015	Succeeded by portfolio abolished
Preceded by Pru Goward	Minister for Planning; 2015–2017	Succeeded by Anthony Roberts
Preceded by Adrian Piccoli	Minister for Education; 2017–2019	Succeeded by Sarah Mitchell as Minister for Education and Early Childhood Learning
Preceded by Anthony Roberts as Minister for Planning	Minister for Planning and Public Spaces; 2019–2021	Succeeded by Anthony Roberts as Minister for Planning
Preceded by Anthony Roberts as Minister for Planning	Minister for Planning and Public Spaces; 2019–2021	Succeeded by himself as Minister for Infrastructure and as Minister for Cities
Preceded by himself as Minister for Planning and Public Spaces	Minister for Infrastructure; 2021–2023	Succeeded by portfolio abolished
Preceded by himself as Minister for Planning and Public Spaces	Minister for Cities; 2021–2023	Succeeded by portfolio abolished
Preceded by himself as Minister for Transport and Roads	Minister for Active Transport; 2021–2023	Succeeded by portfolio abolished
