= John Ajaka =

Australian former politician

The Honourable John Ajaka

21st President of the New South Wales Legislative Council
- In office 21 February 2017 – 24 March 2021
- Deputy: Trevor Khan
- Preceded by: Don Harwin
- Succeeded by: Matthew Mason-Cox

Minister for Ageing
- In office 2 August 2013 – 27 January 2017
- Premier: Mike Baird
- Preceded by: Andrew Constance
- Succeeded by: Tanya Davies

Minister for Disability Services
- In office 2 August 2013 – 27 January 2017
- Premier: Barry O'Farrell; Mike Baird
- Preceded by: Andrew Constance
- Succeeded by: Ray Williams

Minister for Multiculturalism
- In office 2 April 2015 – 27 January 2017
- Premier: Mike Baird
- Preceded by: Victor Dominello (as Minister for Citizenship and Communities)
- Succeeded by: Ray Williams

Minister for the Illawarra
- In office 2 August 2013 – 2 April 2015
- Premier: Barry O'Farrell; Mike Baird
- Preceded by: Greg Pearce
- Succeeded by: portfolio abolished

Member of the New South Wales Legislative Council
- In office 24 March 2007 – 31 March 2021
- Succeeded by: Peter Poulos

Personal details
- Born: 13 January 1956 (age 70) Bulli, New South Wales, Australia
- Party: Liberal Party

John George Ajaka (born 13 January 1956), is a former Australian politician who served as a New South Wales Minister in the O'Farrell and Baird governments. He was a member of the New South Wales Legislative Council from 2007 to 2021, representing the Liberal Party. He was the first Liberal Party Lebanese Australian member of an Australian parliament.

Ajaka served as the Minister for Ageing and Minister for Disability Services from August 2013 to January 2017. He was also appointed as Minister for the Illawarra from 2013 to 2015 in the O'Farrell and first Baird ministries.

Following the 2015 election, Ajaka was appointed Minister for Multiculturalism in the second Baird government. He was not appointed to the Berejikilian Ministry in 2017, instead being appointed as President of the New South Wales Legislative Council until March 2021.

== Background and early years ==
Ajaka was born in Bulli, New South Wales, to migrant parents from Lebanon. He was schooled at St Joseph's Primary School and Marist College Kogarah where he served in the Army Cadets, graduating as the second-highest-ranking officer in his group, and served briefly in the Australian Army Reserve. He subsequently studied law and opened his own practice in Rockdale. He was later elected as a City of Rockdale councillor, serving in that role until his election to parliament.

== State political career ==
Ajaka was elected to the Legislative Council at the 2007 state election. He made his inaugural speech to the Legislative Council on 9 May 2007, in which he called for greater acceptance of migrants within Australian society and declared his intention to oppose racial prejudice and injustice in his role as an MP. He also strongly criticised the police practice of referring to the ethnic backgrounds of criminals, contravening his own party's policy on the matter.

Ajaka was appointed as the Minister for the Illawarra and the Minister for Disability Services on 2 August 2013; and became of member of the O'Farrell cabinet. Due to the resignation of Barry O'Farrell as Premier, and the subsequent ministerial reshuffle by Mike Baird, the new Liberal Leader, in April 2014 in addition to his existing responsibilities as a minister, Ajaka was appointed as the Minister for Ageing.

Following the 2015 state election, Ajaka was appointed as the Minister for Ageing, the Minister for Disability Services and the Minister for Multiculturalism, and the Leader of the Liberal Party in the Legislative Council in the new second Baird government.

In February 2017, he was elected by the Legislative Council to be the President of the New South Wales Legislative Council. He was re-elected during the opening of the 57th Parliament on 7 May 2019. In February 2021, he announced his intention to retire from the NSW Parliament which took effect on 31 March 2021. He resigned as President of the Legislative Council on 24 March 2021.

== Liverpool City Council ==
Ajaka was appointed as the CEO of Liverpool City Council in December 2022. The council voted to terminate Ajaka's employment at the Council meeting on the 29 May 2024. An investigation from the Office of Local Government identified "areas of concern" and concluded that Ajaka had been "denied procedural fairness".

New South Wales Legislative Council
Preceded by Don Harwin	President of the New South Wales Legislative Council; 2017–2021	Succeeded by Matthew Mason-Cox
Political offices
Preceded by Greg Pearce	Minister for the Illawarra; 2013–2015	Portfolio abolished
Preceded by Andrew Constance	Minister for Ageing; 2013–2017	Succeeded by Tanya Davies
Preceded by Andrew Constance	Minister for Disability Services; 2013–2017	Succeeded by Ray Williams
Preceded by Victor Dominello as Minister for Citizenship and Communities	Minister for Multiculturalism; 2015–2017	Succeeded by Ray Williams
Party political offices
Preceded by Duncan Gay	Deputy Leader of the Government in the Legislative Council; 2014–2017	Succeeded by Niall Blair
