= Matthew Mason-Cox =

Australian politician

The Honourable Matthew Mason-Cox

President of the New South Wales Legislative Council
- In office 4 May 2021 – 9 May 2023
- Preceded by: John Ajaka
- Succeeded by: Ben Franklin

Member of New South Wales Legislative Council
- In office 28 September 2006 – 3 March 2023
- Preceded by: Patricia Forsythe

Minister for Fair Trading
- In office 6 May 2014 – 2 April 2015
- Preceded by: Stuart Ayres
- Succeeded by: John Barilaro (as Minister for Small Business)

Personal details
- Born: Matthew Ryan Mason-Cox
- Party: Liberal (2006–2021, 2021–present); Independent (2021)
- Spouse: Wendy Mason-Cox
- Children: 2 sons, 2 daughters
- Education: University of New South Wales
- Website: www.matthewmason-cox.com.au

Matthew Ryan Mason-Cox is an Australian politician who served as President of the New South Wales Legislative Council from 4 May 2021 until 9 May 2023. He was a member of the New South Wales Legislative Council for the Liberal Party from 28 September 2006 until 3 March 2023, with a short two-week stint as an Independent in May 2021. Mason-Cox was the Minister for Fair Trading between May 2014 and April 2015 in the first Baird ministry (one of the shortest ministerial careers in NSW) and served as Leader of the Liberal Party of Australia in the Legislative Council during 2014 and 2015.

== Personal life ==
Mason-Cox operated an optometry business in the city of Queanbeyan, New South Wales. He later served at senior levels in the Australian Public Service and served as secretary and senior adviser to a number of Federal Parliamentary committees including the Defence Sub-Committee and the Family Law Committee inquiry into the Child Support Scheme.

Mason-Cox was also Corporate Counsel to Elders IXL Ltd in Adelaide and trained as a solicitor at Freehills in Sydney. Mason-Cox holds a Bachelor of Laws degree and a Bachelor of Commerce (Finance) degree from the University of New South Wales, where he was awarded the University Prize for Banking Law.

Mason-Cox is married to Wendy Mason-Cox and has four children.

== Political career ==
In 2006, Mason-Cox stood for Liberal Party preselection for a Southern New South Wales regional ballot position for election the New South Wales Legislative Council prior to the 2007 election, challenging incumbent Patricia Forsythe. Mason-Cox would ordinarily have been formally elected to the Legislative Council at the 2007 election, but Forsythe resigned on 13 September 2006. and Mason-Cox was appointed to the resulting casual vacancy and was sworn in as a Member of the Legislative Council on 28 September 2006. Because Mason-Cox took his seat prior to the 2007 election, he was eligible for the Parliamentary Contributory Superannuation Scheme which guarantees him a taxpayer funded pension for life based on his final parliamentary salary.

Mason-Cox raised the state of infrastructure in the Monaro region and the ongoing battle between New South Wales and the Australian Capital Territory over water rights in the Queanbeyan region as early legislative priorities.

Mason-Cox was appointed as the Minister for Fair Trading, in May 2014, but was not appointed to the second Baird ministry following the 2015 state election and following reports he attempted to sack a well-respected senior career bureaucrat for not involving him in a media blitz over faulty USB chargers. He was briefly the leader of the Liberal Party in the Legislative Council during 2014 and 2015 but was not the Government leader in the Council.

Mason-Cox was elected President of the Legislative Council on 4 May 2021 after a dispute over the election of President after the resignation of John Ajaka. Government nominee and fellow Liberal MLC Natasha Maclaren-Jones received 20 votes against the 14 votes of Peter Primrose, the nominee of the Labor opposition, in addition to eight informal votes. The clerk ruled that a majority of the 42 available votes was required for election, although the Liberal Party presented advice from the Crown Solicitor that a plurality of the votes was sufficient and congratulated Maclaren-Jones on her election. As the dispute over the presidency continued, Maclaren-Jones assumed the chair without being declared elected by the clerk on the night of 4 May 2021, before losing a vote of no confidence less than 90 minutes later. On the subsequent ballot to elect a new president, Mason-Cox nominated for the role and won the election with 23 votes to Maclaren-Jones's 18 with the support of the opposition and the crossbench. On assuming the chair, he pledged to be an independent and impartial president, and announced he would no longer attend party room meetings. On 5 May 2021, Mason-Cox was expelled from the Liberal Party after he nominated himself for the position against the Premier's pick. His membership was re-instated two weeks later.

Transport Minister Andrew Constance believes Mason-Cox standing and winning the Legislative Council presidency was in retaliation for being dumped as a minister in 2015 by then-premier Mike Baird.

=== Views ===
Mason-Cox has been described as "hardline anti-abortion". In 2019, he and two other Liberal MPs attempted to move a leadership spill against Gladys Berejiklian after she supported the decriminalisation of abortion.

New South Wales Legislative Council
Preceded by John Ajaka	President of the New South Wales Legislative Council; 2021–2023	Succeeded by Ben Franklin
Political offices
Preceded by Stuart Ayres	Minister for Fair Trading; 2014–2015	Succeeded by John Barilaro as Minister for Small Business
Party political offices
Preceded by Mike Gallacher	Leader of the Liberal Party in the Legislative Council; 2014–2015	Succeeded by John Ajaka
