= Regional minister (New South Wales) =

Australian politician

In New South Wales, regional ministers have been appointed since 1995 on a part-time basis as part of the Government of New South Wales. Each minister has other departmental responsibilities, as well as specific responsibilities for one of the regions of New South Wales. The ministries with regional responsibilities first appeared in 2000 during the Carr Labor Government with a position looking after the Central Coast, this would later be expanded by the Iemma Labor Government from 2005 and O'Farrell Coalition Government in 2011 to five different positions including Western Sydney.

In 2015, the number of ministers was reduced to just three ministers: the Minister for Regional Development, the Minister for Western New South Wales and the Minister for Western Sydney. In the first Berejiklian ministry the portfolio of regional development changed to Regional New South Wales and a fourth regional portfolio created, Regional Water. Following the 2019 state election the ministries were rearranged, with the portfolio of Regional Water abolished and two new regional portfolios, Regional Transport and Roads and Regional Youth, bringing the total to five with effect from 2 April 2019. A sixth portfolio, Regional Health, was created in the second Perrottet ministry.

== Current ministers ==
=== Central Coast ===
Title	Minister	Party	Ministry	Term start	Term end	Time in office	Notes
Minister Assisting the Premier for the Central Coast	John Della Bosca	Labor	Carr (3)	31 March 2000	2 April 2003	4 years, 296 days	
Minister for the Central Coast	John Della Bosca	Labor	Carr (4)	2 April 2003	21 January 2005	4 years, 296 days	
Minister for the Central Coast	Grant McBride	Labor	Iemma (1)	21 January 2005	2 April 2007	2 years, 71 days	
Minister for the Central Coast	John Della Bosca	Labor	Iemma (2)	2 April 2007	1 September 2009	2 years, 152 days	
Minister for the Central Coast	John Hatzistergos	Labor	Rees	1 September 2009	14 September 2009	13 days	
Minister for the Central Coast	Nathan Rees	Labor	Keneally	14 September 2009	8 December 2009	85 days	
Minister for the Central Coast	Ian Macdonald	Labor	Keneally	8 December 2009	5 June 2010	179 days	
Minister for the Central Coast	John Robertson	Labor	Keneally	5 June 2010	28 March 2011	296 days	
Minister for the Central Coast	Chris Hartcher	Liberal	O'Farrell	3 April 2011	4 December 2013	2 years, 245 days	
Minister for the Central Coast	Mike Gallacher	Liberal	O'Farrell; Baird (1)	9 December 2013	2 May 2014	144 days	
Minister for the Central Coast	Rob Stokes	Liberal	Baird (1)	6 May 2014	2 April 2015	331 days	
Parliamentary Secretary for the Hunter and Central Coast	Scot MacDonald	Liberal	Baird (2)	24 April 2015	23 January 2017	1 year, 274 days	
Parliamentary Secretary for Planning and the Central Coast	Scot MacDonald	Liberal	Berejiklian (1)	1 February 2017	5 April 2017	63 days	
Parliamentary Secretary for Planning, the Central Coast and the Hunter	Scot MacDonald	Liberal	Berejiklian (1)	5 April 2017	1 March 2019	1 year, 330 days	
Parliamentary Secretary for the Central Coast	Adam Crouch	Liberal	Berejiklian (2); Perrottet (1)	20 December 2019	21 December 2021	3 years, 98 days	
Parliamentary Secretary for the Central Coast	Adam Crouch	Liberal	Perrottet (2)	21 December 2021	28 March 2023	3 years, 98 days	
Minister for the Central Coast	David Harris	Labor	Minns	5 April 2023	incumbent	3 years, 225 days	

=== Hunter ===
Title	Minister	Party	Ministry	Term start	Term end	Time in office	Notes
Minister Assisting the Premier on Hunter Development	Richard Face	Labor	Carr (1) (2) (3)	4 April 1995	13 February 2003	7 years, 315 days	
Minister Assisting the Premier on Hunter Development	Michael Egan	Labor	Carr (4)	13 February 2003	2 April 2003	48 days	
Minister for the Hunter	Michael Costa	Labor	Carr (4); Iemma (1) (2)	2 April 2003	8 September 2008	5 years, 159 days	
Minister for the Hunter	Jodi McKay	Labor	Rees; Keneally	8 September 2008	28 March 2011	2 years, 201 days	
Minister for the Hunter	Mike Gallacher	Liberal	O'Farrell	3 April 2011	18 December 2013	2 years, 259 days	
Minister for the Hunter	George Souris	National	O'Farrell	18 December 2013	17 April 2014	120 days	
Minister for the Hunter	Gladys Berejiklian	Liberal	Baird (1)	23 April 2014	2 April 2015	344 days	
Parliamentary Secretary for the Hunter and Central Coast	Scot MacDonald	Liberal	Baird (2)	24 April 2015	23 January 2017	1 year, 274 days	
Parliamentary Secretary for Planning, the Central Coast and the Hunter	Scot MacDonald	Liberal	Berejiklian (1)	5 April 2017	1 March 2019	1 year, 330 days	
Minister for the Hunter	Tim Crakanthorp	Labor	Minns	5 April 2023	3 August 2023	120 days	
Minister for the Hunter	Yasmin Catley	Labor	Minns	3 August 2023	incumbent	3 years, 105 days	

=== Illawarra and South Coast ===
Creation of the role of 'Minister for the Illawarra' was a Labor election commitment in 2003. When the portfolio was abolished in 2015, the region's main newspaper, the Illawarra Mercury, noted that all but one of the men to hold the title later departed politics under a cloud: "The now-defunct ministry has been something of a poisoned chalice over the past 12 years, with five of the six ministers who have held the position being disgraced, sacked or forced to resign over their behaviour."

Labor's David Campbell, the first Minister for the Illawarra, quit politics after being filmed leaving a gay bath-house in Sydney. His successor Matt Brown quit following allegations (denied by Brown) that he'd simulated a sex act and danced in his underpants at a function in Parliament House. Paul McLeay quit cabinet after admitting to using a parliamentary computer to visit gambling and porn websites. Eric Roozendaal was a target of the Independent Commission Against Corruption's Operation Indus due to his dealings with disgraced former minister Eddie Obeid, but was cleared in 2013. Greg Pearce, the first Liberal to hold the post, was dumped from the O'Farrell ministry in 2013 amid claims (denied by Pearce) that he had attended parliament drunk – officially, for failing to declare a conflict of interest in relation to a board appointment. The last Minister for the Illawarra, the Liberal party's John Ajaka, "managed to break the portfolio’s curse," however. Following the 2023 New South Wales state election, the ministry was reestablished under Premier of New South Wales Chris Minns who appointed Ryan Park who is also the Minister for Health.

Title	Minister	Party	Ministry	Term start	Term end	Time in office	Notes
Minister for the Illawarra	David Campbell	Labor	Carr (4); Iemma (1) (2)	2 April 2003	5 September 2008	5 years, 156 days	
Minister for the Illawarra	Matt Brown	Labor	Rees	8 September 2008	11 September 2008	3 days	
Minister for the Illawarra	David Campbell	Labor	Rees	11 September 2008	4 December 2009	1 year, 84 days	
Minister for the Illawarra	Paul McLeay	Labor	Keneally	8 December 2009	1 September 2010	267 days	
Minister for the Illawarra	Eric Roozendaal	Labor	Keneally	6 September 2010	28 March 2011	203 days	
Minister for the Illawarra	Greg Pearce	Liberal	O'Farrell	3 April 2011	2 August 2013	2 years, 121 days	
Minister for the Illawarra	John Ajaka	Liberal	O'Farrell	2 August 2013	23 April 2014	264 days	
Minister for the Illawarra	John Ajaka	Liberal	Baird (1)	23 April 2014	2 April 2015	344 days	
Minister for the Illawarra and South Coast	Ryan Park	Labor	Minns	28 March 2023	incumbent	3 years, 233 days	

=== North Coast ===
Title	Minister	Party	Ministry	Term start	Term end	Time in office	Notes
Minister for the North Coast	Don Page	National	O'Farrell	3 April 2011	23 April 2014	3 years, 20 days	
Minister for the North Coast	Andrew Stoner	National	Baird (1)	23 April 2014	17 October 2014	177 days	
Minister for the North Coast	Duncan Gay	National	Baird (1)	17 October 2014	2 April 2015	167 days	
Minister for the North Coast	Rose Jackson	Labor	Minns	5 April 2023	17 March 2025	3 years, 225 days	
Minister for the North Coast	Janelle Saffin	Labor	Minns	17 March 2025	Incumbent	1 year, 244 days	

=== Regional New South Wales ===
The following individuals have served as Minister for Regional New South Wales or any precedent titles:

Title	Minister	Party	Ministry	Term start	Term end	Time in office	Notes
Minister for Regional Development	Ray Chappell	National	Fahey (3)	26 May 1993	4 April 1995	1 year, 313 days	
Minister for Small Business and Regional Development	Carl Scully	Labor	Carr (1)	4 April 1995	15 December 1995	255 days	
Minister for State and Regional Development	Michael Egan	Labor	Carr (1)	15 December 1995	1 December 1997	1 year, 351 days	
Minister for Regional Development	Harry Woods	Labor	Carr (2) (3)	1 December 1997	2 April 2003	5 years, 122 days	
Minister for Regional Development	David Campbell	Labor	Carr (4); Iemma (1)	2 April 2003	2 April 2007	4 years, 0 days	
Minister for Regional Development	Tony Kelly	Labor	Iemma (2)	2 April 2007	5 September 2008	1 year, 156 days	
Minister for Regional Development	Phil Costa	Labor	Rees	8 September 2008	4 December 2009	1 year, 87 days	
Minister for State and Regional Development	Ian Macdonald	Labor	Keneally	8 December 2009	5 June 2010	179 days	
Minister for State and Regional Development	Eric Roozendaal	Labor	Keneally	5 June 2010	28 March 2011	296 days	
Minister for Regional Infrastructure and Services	Andrew Stoner	National	O'Farrell; Baird (1)	28 March 2011	17 October 2014	3 years, 203 days	
Minister for Regional Infrastructure and Services	Troy Grant	National	Baird (1)	17 October 2014	2 April 2015	167 days	
Minister for Regional Development	John Barilaro	National	Baird (2)	2 April 2015	30 January 2017	6 years, 187 days	
Minister for Regional New South Wales	John Barilaro	National	Berejiklian (1)	30 January 2017	2 April 2019	6 years, 187 days	
Minister for Regional New South Wales, Industry and Trade	John Barilaro	National	Berejiklian (2)	2 April 2019	6 October 2021	6 years, 187 days	
Minister for Regional New South Wales	Paul Toole	National	Perrottet (1) (2)	6 October 2021	28 March 2023	1 year, 173 days	
Minister for Regional New South Wales	Tara Moriarty	Labor	Minns	5 April 2023	incumbent	3 years, 225 days	

=== Regional Health ===
The following individuals have served as Minister for regional health, or any precedent titles:

Title	Minister	Party	Ministry	Term start	Term end	Time in office	Notes
Minister for Regional Health	Bronnie Taylor	National	Perrottet (2)	21 December 2021	28 March 2023	1 year, 97 days	
Minister for Health and Regional Health	Ryan Park	Labor	Minns	28 March 2023	5 April 2023	3 years, 233 days	
Minister for Regional Health	Ryan Park	Labor	Minns	5 April 2023	incumbent	3 years, 233 days	

=== Regional Transport and Roads ===
The following individuals have been appointed as Ministers for Regional Transport, or any precedent title.

Ministerial title	Minister	Party	Ministry	Term start	Term end	Time in office	Notes
Minister for Regional Transport and Roads	Paul Toole	National	Berejiklian (2); Perrottet (1)	2 April 2019	21 December 2021	2 years, 263 days	
Minister for Regional Transport and Roads	Sam Farraway	National	Perrottet (2)	21 December 2021	28 March 2023	1 year, 97 days	
Minister for Regional Transport and Roads	Jenny Aitchison	Labor	Minns	5 April 2023	17 March 2025	3 years, 225 days	
Minister for Regional Transport	Jenny Aitchison	Labor	Minns	17 March 2025	incumbent	3 years, 225 days	

=== Western New South Wales ===
The following individuals have served as Minister for Western New South Wales, or any precedent titles:

Title	Minister	Party	Ministry	Term start	Term end	Time in office	Notes
Minister for Western New South Wales	Kevin Humphries	National	O'Farrell; Baird (1)	3 April 2011	2 April 2015	3 years, 364 days	
Minister for Agriculture and Western New South Wales	Adam Marshall	National	Berejiklian (2); Perrottet (1)	2 April 2019	21 December 2021	2 years, 263 days	
Minister for Western New South Wales	Dugald Saunders	National	Perrottet (2)	21 December 2021	28 March 2023	1 year, 97 days	
Minister for Western New South Wales	Tara Moriarty	Labor	Minns	5 April 2023	Incumbent	3 years, 225 days	

=== Western Sydney ===
The following individuals have served as Minister for Western Sydney, or any precedent titles:

Title	Minister	Party	Ministry	Term start	Term end	Time in office	Notes
Minister for Western Sydney	Kim Yeadon	Labor	Carr (3)	8 April 1999	2 April 2003	3 years, 359 days	
Minister for Western Sydney	Diane Beamer	Labor	Carr (4); Iemma (1)	2 April 2003	2 April 2007	4 years, 0 days	
Minister for Western Sydney	Graham West	Labor	Iemma (2)	2 April 2007	11 April 2007	9 days	
Minister for Western Sydney	Barbara Perry	Labor	Iemma (2)	11 April 2007	8 September 2008	1 year, 150 days	
Minister for Western Sydney	David Borger	Labor	Rees; Keneally	8 September 2008	28 March 2011	2 years, 201 days	
Minister for Western Sydney	Barry O'Farrell	Liberal	O'Farrell	3 April 2011	23 April 2014	3 years, 364 days	
Minister for Western Sydney	Mike Baird	Liberal	Baird (1) (2)	23 April 2014	23 January 2017	1 year, 296 days	
Minister for Western Sydney	Stuart Ayres	Liberal	Berejiklian (1)	30 January 2017	23 March 2019	5 years, 185 days	
Minister for Jobs, Investment, Tourism and Western Sydney	Stuart Ayres	Liberal	Berejiklian (2); Perrottet (1)	2 April 2019	21 December 2021	5 years, 185 days	
Minister for Western Sydney	Stuart Ayres	Liberal	Perrottet (2)	21 December 2021	3 August 2022	5 years, 185 days	
Minister for Western Sydney	David Elliott	Liberal	Perrottet (2)	5 August 2022	28 March 2023	235 days	
Minister for Western Sydney	Prue Car	Labor	Minns	5 April 2023	incumbent	3 years, 225 days	

==== Assistant ministers ====
Title	Minister	Party	Ministry	Term start	Term end	Time in office	Notes
Minister Assisting the Premier on Western Sydney	Kim Yeadon	Labor	Carr (1) (2)	1 December 1997	8 April 1999	1 year, 128 days	
Minister Assisting the Premier on Western Sydney	Stuart Ayres	Liberal	O'Farrell; Baird (1)	9 December 2013	2 April 2015	1 year, 114 days	

== Former ministerial titles ==
=== Redfern-Waterloo ===
Title	Minister	Party	Ministry	Term start	Term end	Time in office	Notes
Minister for Redfern-Waterloo	Frank Sartor	Labor	Iemma (1) (2)	3 August 2005	8 September 2008	3 years, 36 days	
Minister for Redfern-Waterloo	Kristina Keneally	Labor	Rees; Keneally	8 September 2008	28 March 2011	2 years, 201 days	

=== Regional Youth ===
The following individuals have been appointed Minister for Youth or any precedent titles:

Title	Minister	Party	Ministry	Term start	Term end	Time in office	Notes
Minister for Child Welfare; Minister for Social Welfare	Frank Hawkins	Labor	Cahill (3) (4); Heffron (1) (2); Renshaw	15 March 1956	13 May 1965	9 years, 59 days	
Minister for Child Welfare; Minister for Social Welfare	Arthur Bridges	Liberal	Askin (1)	13 May 1965	22 May 1968	3 years, 9 days	
Minister for Child Welfare; Minister for Social Welfare	Harry Jago	Liberal	Askin (2)	23 May 1968	3 September 1968	103 days	
Minister for Child Welfare; Minister for Social Welfare	Frederick Hewitt	Liberal	Askin (2) (3)	3 September 1968	11 March 1971	2 years, 189 days	
Minister for Child Welfare; Minister for Social Welfare	John Lloyd Waddy	Liberal	Askin (4)	11 March 1971	17 January 1973	1 year, 312 days	
Minister for Youth and Community Services	John Lloyd Waddy	Liberal	Askin (5)	17 January 1973	3 December 1973	320 days	
Minister for Youth and Community Services	Dick Healey	Liberal	Askin (6)	3 December 1973	3 January 1975	1 year, 31 days	
Minister for Youth, Ethnic and Community Affairs	Steve Mauger	Liberal	Lewis (1) (2)	3 January 1975	23 January 1976	1 year, 20 days	
Minister for Youth, Ethnic and Community Affairs	Jim Clough	Liberal	Willis	23 January 1976	14 May 1976	112 days	
Minister for Youth and Community Services	Rex Jackson	Labor	Wran (1) (2) (3)	14 May 1976	2 October 1981	5 years, 141 days	
Minister for Youth and Community Services	Kevin Stewart	Labor	Wran (4)	2 October 1981	1 February 1983	1 year, 122 days	
Minister for Youth and Community Services	Frank Walker	Labor	Wran (5) (6) (7)	1 February 1983	6 February 1986	3 years, 5 days	
Minister for Youth and Community Services	Peter Anderson	Labor	Wran (8)	6 February 1986	4 July 1986	148 days	
Minister for Youth and Community Services	John Aquilina	Labor	Unsworth	4 July 1986	25 March 1988	1 year, 265 days	
Minister for Education and Youth Affairs	Terry Metherell	Liberal	Greiner (1)	25 March 1988	20 July 1990	2 years, 117 days	
Minister for School Education and Youth Affairs	Virginia Chadwick	Liberal	Greiner (1) (2); Fahey (1) (2)	24 July 1990	26 May 1993	2 years, 306 days	
Minister for Education, Training and Youth Affairs	Virginia Chadwick	Liberal	Fahey (3)	26 May 1993	4 April 1995	1 year, 313 days	
Minister Assisting the Premier on Youth Affairs	John Aquilina	Labor	Carr (1) (2)	26 July 1995	8 April 1999	3 years, 256 days	
Minister Assisting the Premier on Youth Affairs	Carmel Tebbutt	Labor	Carr (3)	8 April 1999	2 April 2003	3 years, 359 days	
Minister for Youth	Carmel Tebbutt	Labor	Carr (4)	2 April 2003	21 January 2005	1 year, 294 days	
Minister for Youth	Reba Meagher	Labor	Iemma (1)	21 January 2005	2 April 2007	2 years, 71 days	
Minister for Youth	Linda Burney	Labor	Iemma (2)	2 April 2007	8 September 2008	1 year, 159 days	
Minister for Youth	Graham West	Labor	Rees	8 September 2008	8 December 2009	1 year, 91 days	
Minister for Youth	Peter Primrose	Labor	Keneally	8 December 2009	28 March 2011	1 year, 110 days	
Minister for Mental Health, Regional Youth and Women	Bronnie Taylor	National	Berejiklian (2); Perrottet (1)	2 April 2019	21 December 2021	2 years, 263 days	
Minister for Regional Youth	Ben Franklin	National	Perrottet (2)	21 December 2021	28 March 2023	1 year, 97 days	
Minister for Education and Early Learning	Prue Car	Labor	Minns	28 March 2023	5 April 2023	8 days	
Minister for Youth	Rose Jackson	Labor	Minns	5 April 2023	incumbent	3 years, 225 days	

== See also ==
- List of New South Wales government agencies
