= George Souris =

Australian politician (born 1949)

The Honourable George Souris AM
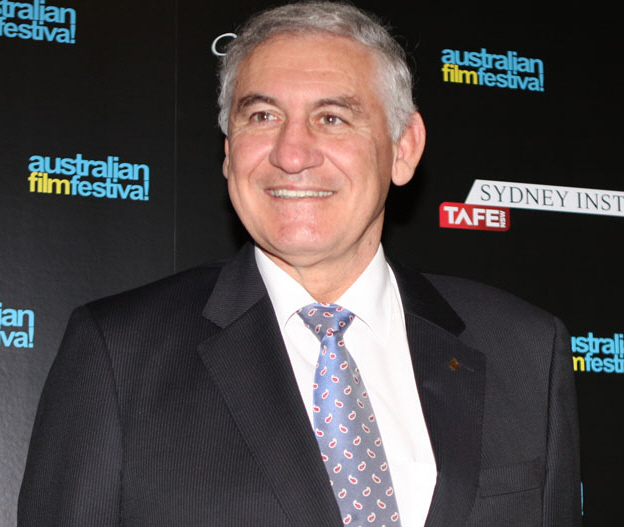

Leader of the National Party in New South Wales
- In office 14 January 1999 – 31 March 2003
- Deputy: John Turner
- Preceded by: Ian Armstrong
- Succeeded by: Andrew Stoner

Minister for Finance
- In office 14 July 1992 – 26 May 1993
- Premier: John Fahey
- Preceded by: Bob Debus
- Succeeded by: Michael Costa

Minister for Land and Water Conservation
- In office 26 May 1993 – 4 April 1995
- Premier: John Fahey
- Preceded by: Bruce Baird
- Succeeded by: John Hannaford

Minister for Ethnic Affairs
- In office 3 July 1992 – 26 May 1993
- Premier: John Fahey
- Preceded by: John Fahey
- Succeeded by: Michael Photios

Minister for Tourism, Major Events, Hospitality and Racing
- In office 3 April 2011 – 23 April 2014
- Premier: Barry O'Farrell; Mike Baird
- Preceded by: Jodi McKay, Kevin Greene
- Succeeded by: Andrew Stoner (as Minister for Tourism and Major Events); Troy Grant (as Minister for Hospitality, Gaming and Racing)
- In office 6 June 1991 – 3 July 1992
- Premier: Nick Greiner; John Fahey
- Preceded by: Bob Rowland Smith
- Succeeded by: Joe Schipp

Minister for the Arts
- In office 3 April 2011 – 23 April 2014
- Premier: Barry O'Farrell; Mike Baird
- Preceded by: Virginia Judge
- Succeeded by: Troy Grant

Member of the New South Wales Parliament for Upper Hunter
- In office 19 March 1988 – 6 March 2015
- Preceded by: Col Fisher
- Succeeded by: Michael Johnsen

Personal details
- Born: 12 July 1949 (age 77) Gunnedah, New South Wales
- Party: National
- Spouse: Vassy
- Education: University of New England
- Profession: Accountant

George Souris AM (born 12 July 1949) is an Australian politician and former member of the New South Wales Legislative Assembly, representing Upper Hunter for the Nationals from 1988 to 2015. Souris is a former leader of the National Party in NSW.

== Early years and background ==
He was born at Gunnedah and was educated at The Armidale School and the University of New England. He represented NSW Country in Rugby Union and played against the touring South African Springboks at Orange 13 July 1971. He has practised as a qualified public accountant, company auditor and taxation consultant. He is married and has two sons.

== Political career ==
Souris represented the electorate of the Upper Hunter for the Country and later re-named National Party of Australia from 1988 until his retirement at the 2015 NSW state election. He was Minister for Finance and Minister for Ethnic Affairs from July 1992 to May 1993 and Minister for Land and Water Conservation from May 1993 to the defeat of the Fahey government in March 1995. He was the leader of the Parliamentary National Party from January 1999 to March 2003.

Souris was deputy leader of the Nationals from 1993 to 1999 when he ousted Ian Armstrong as leader. When he stood down as National Party leader he became the first person to leave the National Party leadership without becoming deputy premier since Sir Davis Hughes (served 1958 to 1959 when the party was then called the Country Party).

Souris was a member of the Shadow Ministry of Barry O'Farrell.

Souris was the Minister for Tourism, Major Events, Hospitality and Racing, and Minister for the Arts in the O'Farrell government, between 2011 and 2014. He was also Minister for the Hunter between December 2013 and April 2014. When O'Farrell was succeeded as Premier by Mike Baird, Souris was dumped from Cabinet, a decision that disappointed Souris. On 27 September he announced that he will retire and not recontest Upper Hunter at the 2015 election. On his retirement announcement he revealed that it was the decision of Deputy Premier and his successor as Nationals leader Andrew Stoner for him to be removed from Cabinet, not Premier Baird's.

New South Wales Legislative Assembly
Preceded by Col Fisher	Member for Upper Hunter; 1988–2015	Succeeded by Michael Johnsen
Political offices
Preceded by Bob Rowland Smith	Minister for Sport, Recreation and Racing; 1991–1992	Succeeded by Joe Schipp
Preceded by Phillip Smiles	Assistant Treasurer of New South Wales; 1992–1993	Vacant Title next held by John Della Bosca
Vacant Title last held by Bob Debus	Minister for Finance; 1992–1993	Vacant Title next held by Michael Costa
Preceded by John Fahey	Minister for Ethnic Affairs; 1992–1993	Succeeded by Michael Photios
Preceded by Garry West as Minister for Conservation and Land Management	Minister for Land and Water Conservation; 1993–1995	Succeeded by Kim Yeadon
Preceded by Virginia Judge	Minister for the Arts; 2011–2014	Succeeded by Troy Grant
Preceded by Jodi McKay as Minister for Tourism	Minister for Tourism, Major Events, Hospitality and Racing; 2011–2014	Succeeded by Andrew Stoner as Minister for Tourism and Major Events
Preceded by Kevin Greene as Minister for Gaming and Racing and Minister for Major Events	Minister for Tourism, Major Events, Hospitality and Racing; 2011–2014	Succeeded by Troy Grant as Minister for Hospitality, Gaming and Racing
Preceded by Mike Gallacher	Minister for the Hunter; 2013–2014	Succeeded by Gladys Berejiklian
Party political offices
Preceded by Ian Armstrong	Deputy Leader of the New South Wales National Party; 1993–1999	Succeeded by John Turner
Preceded by Ian Armstrong	Leader of the New South Wales National Party; 1999–2003	Succeeded by Andrew Stoner
