= Baird ministry =

Baird ministry may refer to:

- First Baird ministry (2014–2015), the 94th Cabinet of New South Wales
- Second Baird ministry (2015–2017), the 95th Cabinet of New South Wales
