= Andrew Stoner =

Australian politician

The Honourable Andrew Stoner AM
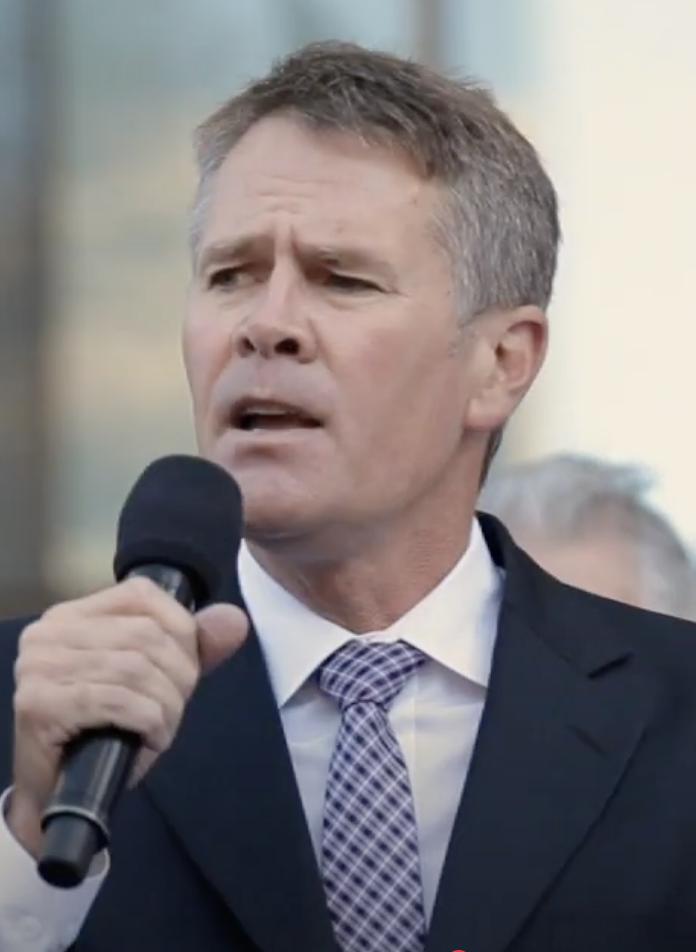

16th Deputy Premier of New South Wales
- In office 28 March 2011 – 17 October 2014
- Premier: Barry O'Farrell; Mike Baird
- Preceded by: Carmel Tebbutt
- Succeeded by: Troy Grant
- Constituency: Oxley

Leader of the New South Wales National Party
- In office 31 March 2003 – 17 October 2014
- Deputy: Don Page (2003–07); Andrew Fraser (2007–08); Adrian Piccoli (2008–14)
- Preceded by: George Souris
- Succeeded by: Troy Grant

Minister for Trade and Investment
- In office 3 April 2011 – 17 October 2014
- Premier: Barry O'Farrell; Mike Baird
- Succeeded by: Troy Grant

Minister for Regional Infrastructure and Services
- In office 3 April 2011 – 17 October 2014
- Premier: Barry O'Farrell; Mike Baird
- Preceded by: Eric Roozendaal (as Minister for State and Regional Development)
- Succeeded by: Troy Grant

Minister for the North Coast
- In office 23 April 2014 – 17 October 2014
- Premier: Mike Baird
- Preceded by: Don Page
- Succeeded by: Duncan Gay

Member of the New South Wales Legislative Assembly for Oxley
- In office 27 March 1999 – 6 March 2015
- Preceded by: Bruce Jeffery
- Succeeded by: Melinda Pavey

Personal details
- Born: Andrew John Stoner; 14 January 1960 (age 66) Brisbane, Queensland
- Party: National Party
- Occupation: Politician
- Website: www.andrewstoner.com.au

Andrew John Stoner AM (born 14 January 1960) is an Australian former politician who served as a member of the New South Wales Legislative Assembly representing Oxley from 1999 until 2015.

Stoner was the Leader of the New South Wales National Party from 2003 to 2014, and Deputy Premier of New South Wales from 2011 to 2014. He was the Minister for Trade and Investment, and Minister for Regional Infrastructure and Services, between 2011 and 2014; and the Minister for Tourism and Major Events, the Minister for Small Business, and the Minister for the North Coast, between April and October 2014 in the Baird government.

== Biography ==
Stoner was born in 1960 in Brisbane, Queensland, before his family moved to Wauchope, New South Wales. He attended the Queensland Institute of Technology from 1979 to 1985, receiving a Bachelor of Business, and later James Cook University of North Queensland in 1993, receiving a Master of Business Administration with first class honours. He became an employment agency manager and a regional manager in the Australian Public Service before entering parliament.

Stoner joined the National Party of Australia and was elected to the New South Wales Legislative Assembly on 27 March 1999 for Oxley. He was appointed the National Party Deputy Whip in his first term in office and rose to become Shadow Minister for Emergency Services and Shadow Minister for Sport and Recreation from 2002 to 2003. However, after the Liberal-National Coalition lost the 2003 election, the then Nationals leader George Souris stood aside and Stoner was elected in his place.

Stoner helped lead the Coalition to a landslide victory in the 2011 state election. The Liberals won a majority in their own right (51 seats)--the first time that the main non-Labor party in New South Wales had won an outright majority under the Liberal banner. Although O'Farrell could have theoretically governed alone, he chose to retain the coalition with the Nationals. In a departure from normal practice, O'Farrell and Stoner were sworn in as an interim two-man government on 28 March even though counting was still underway.

In a 2013 interview marking his ten–year anniversary as leader of the Nationals, Stoner reflected that:

(Mr O'Farrell) could see that The Nationals supported him, that we weren't a disunifying force within the Coalition and as a result we had a strong Coalition.... A student of political history, he knows the 2011 election result was probably a high water mark for the Liberal party (and) that The Nationals tend to be a little more stable in terms of their own numbers between elections. When the tide goes back out for the Liberal party, he will need The Nationals. It will happen and he will need, at some stage, the National party.

— Andrew Stoner, interviewed by The Land, April 2013.

Owing to the resignation of Barry O'Farrell as Premier, and the subsequent ministerial reshuffle by Mike Baird, in April 2014 in addition to his existing responsibilities as a minister, Stoner was appointed as the Minister for Tourism and Major Events, as the Minister for Small Business, and as the Minister for the North Coast.

In the same reshuffle Premier Baird acceded to Stoner's request to dump his predecessor as Nationals leader George Souris from Cabinet, a request that was revealed when Souris announced his retirement from politics later in 2014 on 27 September.

On 15 October, Stoner stood down as National Party leader and as deputy premier, citing family reasons. He also announced he would retire from politics at the next election. Troy Grant was elected unopposed as his successor.

Stoner is now a company director, consultant and adviser to several companies.

== Personal life ==
A keen surfer and father of six, Stoner now resides in Port Macquarie on the Mid North Coast. He separated from his former wife in 2016, divorced in 2019 and was remarried in 2020, to Dr Caroline Hong, a dentist. Stoner and his wife are now part of a Multi Level Marketing Company called "Three International".

== See also ==
- O'Farrell ministry
- Baird ministry
- Shadow Ministry of Barry O'Farrell

New South Wales Legislative Assembly
Preceded by Bruce Jeffery	Member for Oxley; 1999–2015	Succeeded by Melinda Pavey
Party political offices
Preceded by George Souris	Leader of the New South Wales National Party; 2003–2014	Succeeded by Troy Grant
Political offices
Preceded by Carmel Tebbutt	Deputy Premier of New South Wales; 2011–2014	Succeeded by Troy Grant
New title	Minister for Trade and Investment; 2011–2014	Succeeded by Troy Grant
Preceded by Eric Roozendaal as Minister for State and Regional Development	Minister for Regional Infrastructure and Services; 2011–2014	Succeeded by Troy Grant
Preceded by George Souris	Minister for Tourism and Major Events; 2014	Succeeded by Troy Grant
Preceded by Katrina Hodgkinson	Minister for Small Business; 2014	Succeeded by John Barilaro
Preceded by Don Page	Minister for the North Coast; 2014	Succeeded by Duncan Gay
