= O'Farrell ministry =

New South Wales government (2011-2014)

- 93rd Cabinet of New South Wales

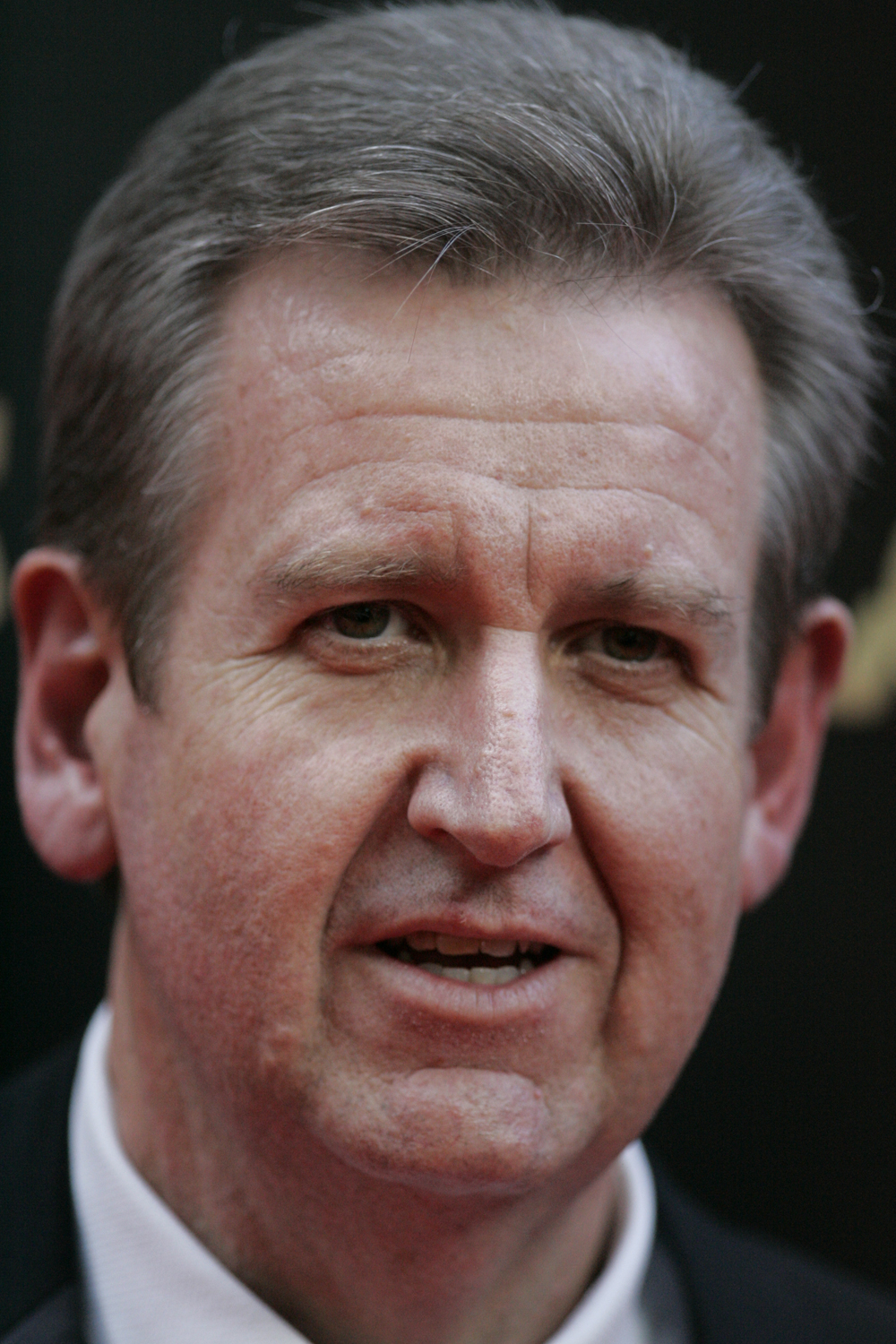
- Premier Barry O'Farrell, pictured in 2012
- Date formed: 3 April 2011
- Date dissolved: 23 April 2014

People and organisations
- Monarch: Queen Elizabeth II
- Governor: Marie Bashir
- Premier: Barry O'Farrell
- Deputy Premier: Andrew Stoner
- No. of ministers: 22
- Member party: Liberal–National Coalition
- Status in legislature: Coalition Majority Government
- Opposition party: Labor
- Opposition leader: John Robertson

History
- Election: 2011 New South Wales state election
- Predecessor: Keneally ministry
- Successor: First Baird ministry

The O'Farrell ministry was the 93rd ministry of the Government of New South Wales, and was led by Barry O'Farrell, the state's 43rd Premier.

The Liberal–National coalition ministry was formed following the defeat of the Keneally-led Labor government at the 2011 election. It was the first coalition ministry since the Greiner-Fahey-led coalition ministries of the late 1980s and early 1990s.

On 28 March 2011, O'Farrell and Nationals leader Andrew Stoner were sworn in by Governor Marie Bashir, as Premier and Deputy Premier respectively at a ceremony held in the office of the Chief Secretary of New South Wales. Although the Coalition's landslide victory was beyond doubt, counting was still underway in a few seats. With this in mind, O'Farrell had himself and Stoner sworn in as an interim two-man government until a full ministry could be sworn in. The balance of the ministry was sworn in on 3 April 2011 at Government House by the Lieutenant Governor, James Spigelman.

On 16 April 2014, O'Farrell announced his intention to resign as Premier and as Leader of the Liberal Party, leading to the end of his government. The following day, Mike Baird was elected as Leader of the Liberal Party and he formed the Baird ministry which was sworn in on 23 April 2014.

== Composition of ministry ==
The first re-arrangement occurred in August 2013, when Greg Pearce was dismissed from the ministry. (Note: On 1 August 2013 Greg Pearce was dismissed from the ministry after an investigation revealed that he failed to disclose a conflict of interest when making an appointment to the board of Sydney Water. His portfolio of Finance and Services was assigned to Andrew Constance and the Illawarra was assigned to John Ajaka who was also assigned assumed Constance's former portfolio of Disability Services.) The same month Graham Annesley resigned from the ministry and from parliament. (Note: Graham Annesley resigned from the ministry and from parliament on 28 August 2013 to become CEO of the Gold Coast Titans. Gabrielle Upton was promoted to the ministry in Annersley's portfolio of Sport and Recreation.) The ministry was re-arranged when Chris Hartcher resigned from cabinet in December 2013. (Note: Chris Hartcher resigned from cabinet on 4 December 2013 after the Independent Commission Against Corruption (ICAC) raided his office in relation to allegations of electoral funding irregularities. His portfolios of Resources and Energy and Special Minister of State were assigned to Anthony Roberts and Central Coast was assigned to the Leader of the Government in the Legislative Council Mike Gallacher. Stuart Ayres was promoted to the ministry, replacing Roberts as Minister for Fair Trading and to assist the Premier on Western Sydney.) The ministry was dissolved on 23 April 2014 and succeeded by the Baird ministry.

Portfolio	Minister	Party	Term commence	Term end	Term of office
Premier	Barry O'Farrell	Liberal	28 March 2011	17 April 2014	3 years, 20 days
Minister for Western Sydney	Barry O'Farrell	Liberal	28 March 2011	17 April 2014	3 years, 20 days
Deputy Premier	Andrew Stoner	National	28 March 2011	17 April 2014	3 years, 20 days
Minister for Trade and Investment	Andrew Stoner	National	28 March 2011	17 April 2014	3 years, 20 days
Minister for Regional Infrastructure and Services	Andrew Stoner	National	28 March 2011	17 April 2014	3 years, 20 days
Minister for Health	Jillian Skinner	Liberal	3 April 2011	17 April 2014	3 years, 14 days
Minister for Medical Research	Jillian Skinner	Liberal	3 April 2011	17 April 2014	3 years, 14 days
Minister for Education	Adrian Piccoli	National	3 April 2011	17 April 2014	3 years, 14 days
Minister for Police and Emergency Services	Mike Gallacher MLC	Liberal	3 April 2011	17 April 2014	3 years, 14 days
Minister for the Hunter	Mike Gallacher MLC	Liberal	3 April 2011	17 April 2014	3 years, 14 days
Vice-President of the Executive Council; Leader of the Government in Legislative Council	Mike Gallacher MLC	Liberal	3 April 2011	17 April 2014	3 years, 14 days
Minister for Roads and Ports	Duncan Gay MLC	National	3 April 2011	17 April 2014	3 years, 14 days
Minister for Planning and Infrastructure	Brad Hazzard	Liberal	3 April 2011	17 April 2014	3 years, 14 days
Minister Assisting the Premier on Infrastructure NSW	Brad Hazzard	Liberal	3 April 2011	17 April 2014	3 years, 14 days
Minister for Resources and Energy	Chris Hartcher	Liberal	3 April 2011	4 December 2013	2 years, 245 days
Minister for Resources and Energy	Anthony Roberts	Liberal	9 December 2013	17 April 2014	129 days
Special Minister of State	Chris Hartcher	Liberal	3 April 2011	4 December 2013	2 years, 245 days
Special Minister of State	Anthony Roberts	Liberal	9 December 2013	17 April 2014	129 days
Minister for the Central Coast	Chris Hartcher	Liberal	3 April 2011	4 December 2013	2 years, 245 days
Minister for the Central Coast	Mike Gallacher MLC	Liberal	9 December 2013	17 April 2014	129 days
Minister for Transport	Gladys Berejiklian	Liberal	3 April 2011	17 April 2014	3 years, 20 days
Minister for Tourism, Major Events, Hospitality and Racing	George Souris	National	3 April 2011	17 April 2014	3 years, 20 days
Minister for the Arts	George Souris	National	3 April 2011	17 April 2014	3 years, 20 days
Treasurer	Mike Baird	Liberal	3 April 2011	17 April 2014	3 years, 20 days
Minister for Industrial Relations	Mike Baird	Liberal	12 September 2012	17 April 2014	1 year, 217 days
Minister for Finance and Services	Greg Pearce	Liberal	3 April 2011	1 August 2013	2 years, 120 days
Minister for Finance and Services	Andrew Constance	Liberal	1 August 2013	17 April 2014	259 days
Minister for the Illawarra	Greg Pearce	Liberal	3 April 2011	1 August 2013	2 years, 120 days
Minister for the Illawarra	John Ajaka MLC	Liberal	1 August 2013	17 April 2014	259 days
Minister for Primary Industries	Katrina Hodgkinson	National	3 April 2011	17 April 2014	3 years, 20 days
Minister for Small Business	Katrina Hodgkinson	National	3 April 2011	17 April 2014	3 years, 20 days
Minister for Ageing	Andrew Constance	Liberal	3 April 2011	17 April 2014	3 years, 20 days
Minister for Disability Services	Andrew Constance	Liberal	3 April 2011	1 August 2013	2 years, 120 days
Minister for Disability Services	John Ajaka MLC	Liberal	1 August 2013	17 April 2014	259 days
Attorney General	Greg Smith SC	Liberal	3 April 2011	17 April 2014	3 years, 20 days
Minister for Justice	Greg Smith SC	Liberal	3 April 2011	17 April 2014	3 years, 20 days
Minister for Local Government	Don Page	National	3 April 2011	17 April 2014	3 years, 20 days
Minister for the North Coast	Don Page	National	3 April 2011	17 April 2014	3 years, 20 days
Minister for Family and Community Services	Pru Goward	Liberal	3 April 2011	17 April 2014	3 years, 20 days
Minister for Women	Pru Goward	Liberal	3 April 2011	17 April 2014	3 years, 20 days
Minister for Fair Trading	Anthony Roberts	Liberal	3 April 2011	9 December 2013	2 years, 250 days
Minister for Fair Trading	Stuart Ayres	Liberal	9 December 2013	17 April 2014	129 days
Minister Assisting the Premier on Western Sydney	Stuart Ayres	Liberal	9 December 2013	17 April 2014	129 days
Minister for Mental Health	Kevin Humphries	National	3 April 2011	17 April 2014	3 years, 20 days
Minister for Healthy Lifestyles	Kevin Humphries	National	3 April 2011	17 April 2014	3 years, 20 days
Minister for Western New South Wales	Kevin Humphries	National	3 April 2011	17 April 2014	3 years, 20 days
Minister for the Environment	Robyn Parker	Liberal	3 April 2011	17 April 2014	3 years, 20 days
Minister for Heritage	Robyn Parker	Liberal	3 April 2011	17 April 2014	3 years, 20 days
Minister for Citizenship and Communities	Victor Dominello	Liberal	3 April 2011	17 April 2014	3 years, 20 days
Minister for Aboriginal Affairs	Victor Dominello	Liberal	3 April 2011	17 April 2014	3 years, 20 days
Minister for Sport and Recreation	Graham Annesley	Liberal	3 April 2011	28 August 2013	2 years, 149 days
Minister for Sport and Recreation	Gabrielle Upton	Liberal	30 August 2013	17 April 2014	230 days

Ministers are members of the Legislative Assembly unless otherwise noted.

== See also ==
- Members of the New South Wales Legislative Assembly, 2011–2015
- Members of the New South Wales Legislative Council, 2011–2015

== Notes ==
New South Wales government ministries
Preceded by Keneally ministry	O'Farrell ministry 2011–2014	Succeeded by first Baird ministry
