= Duncan Gay =

Australian politician (born 1950)

The Honourable Duncan Gay AM
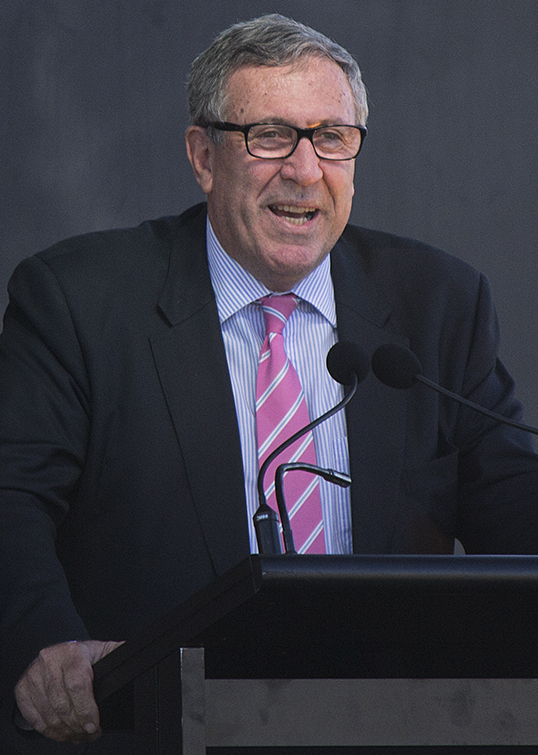
- Duncan Gay in 2013

Vice-President of the Executive Council
- In office 6 May 2014 – 30 January 2017
- Premier: Mike Baird
- Preceded by: Mike Gallacher
- Succeeded by: Don Harwin

Leader of the Government in the Legislative Council
- In office 6 May 2014 – 30 January 2017
- Leader: Mike Baird
- Preceded by: Mike Gallacher
- Succeeded by: Don Harwin

Minister for Roads, Maritime and Freight
- In office 2 April 2015 – 30 January 2017
- Premier: Mike Baird
- Preceded by: himself (Roads and Freight)
- Succeeded by: Melinda Pavey

Minister for Roads and Freight
- In office 23 April 2014 – 2 April 2015
- Premier: Mike Baird
- Preceded by: himself (Roads and Ports)
- Succeeded by: himself (Roads, Maritime and Freight)

Minister for the North Coast
- In office 17 October 2014 – 2 April 2015
- Premier: Mike Baird
- Preceded by: Andrew Stoner
- Succeeded by: portfolio abolished

Minister for Roads and Ports
- In office 3 April 2011 – 23 April 2014
- Premier: Barry O'Farrell
- Preceded by: David Borger (Roads); Eric Roozendaal (Ports and Waterways)
- Succeeded by: himself (Roads and Freight)

Deputy Leader of the Government in the Legislative Council
- In office 3 May 2011 – 6 May 2014
- Leader: Barry O'Farrell; Mike Baird
- Preceded by: Eric Roozendaal
- Succeeded by: John Ajaka

Member of the New South Wales Legislative Council
- In office 19 March 1988 – 31 July 2017
- Succeeded by: Wes Fang

Personal details
- Born: Duncan John Gay; 2 May 1950 (age 76) Crookwell, New South Wales, Australia
- Party: The Nationals
- Spouse: Katie Gay
- Relations: Grandchildren, Autumn Starbird, Xanthe Starbird, Mhairi Wyllie, Emmeline Wyllie, Eleanor Wyllie
- Children: Anna Gay, James Gay
- Education: Newington College

Duncan John Gay AM (born 2 May 1950) is a former Australian politician who served as the Vice-President of the Executive Council of New South Wales and the Leader of the Government in the Legislative Council from May 2014 to January 2017; and the Minister for Roads, Maritime and Freight from April 2015 to January 2017. Gay served as the Leader of the Nationals in the Legislative Council until January 2017 and was a member of the Council from 1988 to 2017, representing the Nationals.

He served as the Minister for Roads and Freight, and as the Minister for the North Coast between 2014 and 2015 in the first Baird government; and the Minister for Roads and Ports in the O'Farrell ministry between 2011 and 2014.

== Early life ==
Gay was born and raised in Crookwell, New South Wales near Goulburn and educated at Crookwell District Rural School. He attended Newington College from 1962 until 1967 in Sydney as a boarding student before studying accountancy and wool classing. He is married to Katie and they have two children, Anna and James.

Prior to his political career, Gay owned a small trucking company and managed his family's grazing property at Crookwell. His father, Harry, served on Crookwell Shire Council for many years, and community service was an enduring influence on Gay's own career.

== Political career ==
Gay was elected as a member of the New South Wales Legislative Council in March 1988 and has been a member of the National Party since 1974; and served in various portfolios and positions while in opposition.

Following the election of the O'Farrell government at the 2011 election, Gay was appointed as the Minister for Roads and Ports in the New South Wales government. Following the resignation of Barry O'Farrell as Premier, and the subsequent ministerial reshuffle by Mike Baird, the new Liberal Leader, in April 2014 the name of Gay's portfolio changed to Minister for Roads and Freight; the responsibilities as Vice-President of the Executive Council and Leader of the Government in the Legislative Council were added in May 2014; and as Minister for the North Coast added in October 2014. Following the 2015 state election, Gay's portfolio responsibilities were amended slightly and renamed as Minister for Roads, Maritime and Freight.

Major activities in Gay's term as Minister for Roads included Bridges for the Bush, Fixing Country Roads and Fixing Country Rail as well as commencement of planning for the introduction of the WestConnex; a road project that has had its costs reported to be overrun by A$1.4 billion. Gay announced the preferred construction contractor for the NorthConnex; and the continued duplication of the Pacific Highway.

As Roads Minister, he described himself as “the biggest bike lane sceptic in the government”. He cut funding to protected cycleway projects and quadrupled fines for cyclists.

In January 2017 Gay was replaced in the reshuffle of the Berejiklian ministry. He retired from politics at the end of July 2017, having served almost 30 years in the NSW Upper House. Upon retirement, he took up a paid executive advisory role with private transport and infrastructure consultancy MU Group.

== Post-political career ==
=== Board and advisory roles ===
He was appointed as a Director of the ARC Asia-Pacific RPAS Consortium, and in September 2018 was appointed chairman of the National Heavy Vehicle Regulator (NHVR). He served as NHVR chair for seven years.

In September 2020, Gay was appointed as a Director of Essential Energy, bringing parliamentary and government sector expertise to the board of the state-owned electricity network business, which serves more than 870,000 homes and businesses across regional, rural, and remote New South Wales.

In May 2022, Gay was appointed inaugural Chairman of the NSW Freight Transport Advisory Council (FTAC), a new body that replaced the Freight and Logistics Advisory Council and the Road Freight Industry Council to represent the entire freight chain across different transport modes. He continued to chair the FTAC into 2025.

Gay also serves as Chair of the Advisory Board at MU Group, and is a Director of the Bush Children's Education Foundation of NSW, and a Director of the Sir Earle Page Memorial Trust, which awards education scholarships to regional students.

=== National Heavy Vehicle Regulator chairmanship ===
Gay served as NHVR Chairman from September 2018. In November 2024, Gay announced the appointment of Nicole Rosie as the new NHVR Chief Executive Officer, following the resignation of long-serving CEO Sal Petroccitto OAM, who departed in January 2025 after more than a decade leading the regulator.

In April 2026, Gay stepped down from the NHVR chairmanship after seven years at the helm. He was succeeded as chair by former South Australian Transport Minister Patrick Conlon, who was appointed for a term through to 2028.

== Honours ==
Gay was appointed as a Member of the Order of Australia in the 2023 King's Birthday Honours for "significant service to the people and Parliament of New South Wales, and to the community". In September 2025, Gay was honoured with the Personality of the Year Award at the 35th Australian Freight Industry Awards (AFIAs), held at Crown Palladium, Melbourne.

Parliament of New South Wales
Political offices
Preceded by David Borger as Minister for Roads	Minister for Roads and Ports; 2011–2014	Succeeded by Himself as Minister for Roads and Freight
Preceded by Eric Roozendaal as Minister for Ports and Waterways	Minister for Roads and Ports; 2011–2014	Succeeded by Himself as Minister for Roads and Freight
Preceded by Himself as Minister for Roads and Ports	Minister for Roads and Freight; 2014–2015	Succeeded by Himself as Minister for Roads, Maritime and Freight
Preceded by Andrew Stoner	Minister for the North Coast; 2014–2015	Succeeded by portfolio abolished
Preceded by Himself as Minister for Roads and Freight	Minister for Roads, Maritime and Freight; 2015–2017	Succeeded by Melinda Pavey
Preceded by Mike Gallacher	Vice-President of the Executive Council; Leader of the Government in the Legislative Council; 2014–2017	Succeeded by Don Harwin
New South Wales Legislative Council
Preceded by Sir Adrian Solomons	Chairman of Committees; 1991–1999	Succeeded by Tony Kelly
Preceded by Eric Roozendaal	Deputy Leader of the Government in the Legislative Council; 2011–2014	Succeeded by John Ajaka
