= Scot MacDonald =

Australian politician (born 1961)

NSW Parliamentary Secretary for the Central Coast
- In office 24 April 2015 – 1 March 2019
- Minister: John Barilaro
- Preceded by: Rob Stokes (as Minister for the Central Coast)

NSW Parliamentary Secretary for Planning
- In office 1 February 2017 – 1 March 2019
- Minister: Anthony Roberts

NSW Parliamentary Secretary for the Hunter
- In office 5 April 2017 – 1 March 2019
- Minister: John Barilaro
- In office 24 April 2015 – 23 January 2017
- Minister: John Barilaro

Member of the New South Wales Legislative Council
- In office 26 March 2011 – 23 March 2019

Personal details
- Born: 15 February 1961 (age 65)
- Party: Liberal
- Website: scotmacdonald.com.au

Scot MacDonald (born 15 February 1961) is an Australian politician. He was a Liberal Party member of the New South Wales Legislative Council from 2011 to 2019. He served as a Parliamentary Secretary from 2015 to 2019.

MacDonald holds a Bachelor of Financial Administration and a Masters of Environmental Management from the University of New England.

Prior to NSW Parliament, MacDonald was an executive officer at Riverina Citrus. From 1989 to 2008 he owned and managed with his wife, Guyra Rural Services for 20 years. The business was based in the Northern Tablelands of NSW and serviced farmers across northern NSW.

MacDonald ran for the Australian Senate at the fifth spot on the Coalition ticket at the 2001 election. He was the Liberal candidate for New England at the 2004 election. He finished third. MacDonald was also an unsuccessful candidate for the New South Wales Legislative Council in 2007 before being elected in 2011.

He was a member of numerous Parliamentary committees including GPSC5 which is notable for its Inquiry into Coal Seam Gas. He has also served on a wide range of inquries, such as the management of public lands, corrective services, racial vilification, and Valuer General.

== Political views ==
MacDonald is a strong advocate of free trade. He believes the free market provides the greatest opportunities for individuals and enterprise.

== Personal life ==
He is married to Aileen MacDonald, a member of the NSW Legislative Council. They have three children (Alex, James and Nicola) and one granddaughter.
