= Andrew Constance =

Australian politician (born 1973)

The Honourable Andrew Constance
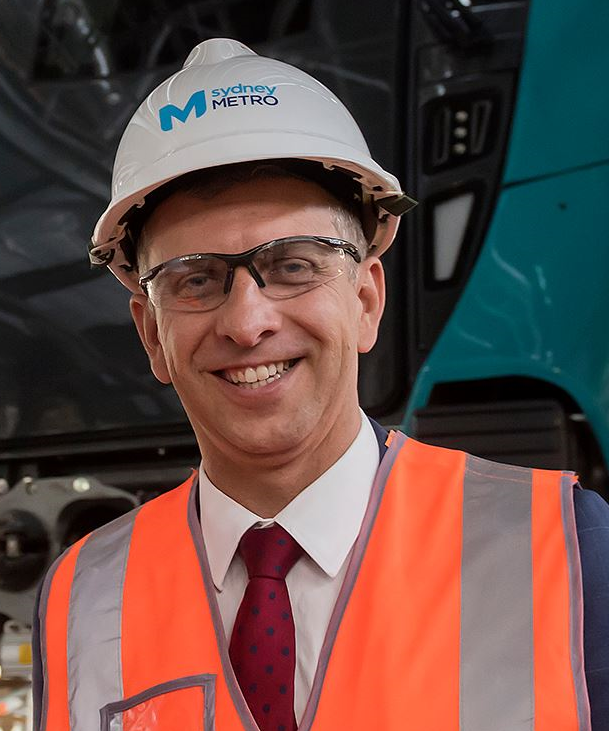
- Constance at the Tallawong train yard in September 2017

Member of the New South Wales Parliament for Bega
- In office 22 March 2003 – 30 December 2021
- Preceded by: Russell Smith
- Succeeded by: Michael Holland
Ministerial positions
Minister for Transport and Roads
In office 2 April 2019 – 6 October 2021
| Premier | Gladys Berejiklian; Dominic Perrottet |
| Preceded by | himself (as Minister for Transport and Infrastructure) |
| Succeeded by | Rob Stokes |
Leader of the House
In office 2 April 2019 – 8 May 2020
| Premier | Gladys Berejiklian |
| Succeeded by | Mark Speakman |
Minister for Transport and Infrastructure
In office 2 April 2015 – 23 March 2019
| Premier | Mike Baird; Gladys Berejiklian |
| Preceded by | Gladys Berejiklian (as Minister for Transport) |
| Succeeded by | himself (as Minister for Transport and Roads) |
Treasurer of New South Wales
In office 23 April 2014 – 2 April 2015
| Premier | Mike Baird |
| Preceded by | Mike Baird |
| Succeeded by | Gladys Berejiklian |
Minister for Industrial Relations
In office 6 May 2014 – 2 April 2015
| Premier | Mike Baird |
| Preceded by | Mike Gallacher |
| Succeeded by | Gladys Berejiklian |
Minister for Finance and Services
In office 2 August 2013 – 17 April 2014
| Premier | Barry O'Farrell |
| Preceded by | Greg Pearce |
| Succeeded by | Dominic Perrottet |
Minister for Ageing Minister for Disability Services
In office 4 April 2011 – 2 August 2013
| Premier | Barry O'Farrell |
| Preceded by | Peter Primrose |
| Succeeded by | John Ajaka |

Personal details
- Born: Andrew James Constance; 31 October 1973 (age 53)
- Party: Liberal Party

Andrew James Constance (born 31 October 1973) is an Australian politician who represented Bega for the Liberal Party in the New South Wales Legislative Assembly between 2003 and December 2021. In September 2025, he was appointed chief executive officer of Shoalhaven City Council.

Constance served as the New South Wales Minister for Transport and Roads in the second Berejiklian ministry from April 2019 until October 2021. Previously, he served as the Minister for Transport and Infrastructure from 2 April 2015 until 23 March 2019 in the second Baird and first Berejiklian governments; as the Treasurer of New South Wales and the Minister for Industrial Relations between 2014 and 2015 in the first Baird government; as the Minister for Ageing and Disability Services between 2011 and 2013; and as the Minister for Finance and Services, between 2013 and 2014, in the O'Farrell government.

== Political career ==
=== State politics ===
At the time Constance was elected in 2003, he was aged 29 years, and he became the youngest member of the Parliament. Constance previously worked as a corporate affairs consultant representing large industry associations and multinationals in the Asia-Pacific region. A former president of the Young Liberals, his family connections in the Bega area stem back to the 1860s when his great-great-grandfather, James Constance, drove a team of bullocks through the Bega Valley.

Constance was promoted to Minister for Finance and Services in 2013 after the sacking of Greg Pearce, with the portfolio of Ageing and Disability Services transferred to John Ajaka.

Due to the resignation of Barry O'Farrell as premier, and the subsequent ministerial reshuffle by Mike Baird, the former Treasurer and new Liberal Leader, in April 2014 Constance was appointed as Treasurer; and his responsibilities expanded to include Industrial Relations less than one month later. Constance handed down his first Budget on 17 June 2014.

Following the 2015 state election, Constance was appointed Minister for Transport and Infrastructure. During Constance's tenure as minister, NSW was the first Australian state to legalise ridesharing companies including Uber. Constance was also responsible for the Sydney Metro. He continued to be the Minister for Transport after Gladys Berejiklian became premier in 2017. Following the 2019 state election, Constance was sworn in as the Minister for Transport and Roads in the second Berejiklian ministry, with effect from 2 April 2019. In this role Constance brought in mobile phone detection cameras which have generated a large amount of fine revenue for the state government.

On 10 March 2020, Constance announced his resignation from politics and will not contest the next state election, citing that recovery from the bushfires will take priority before announcing an effective date.

Constance supported the legalisation of voluntary assisted dying in New South Wales.

Constance also supported the amendment to the NSW Crimes Act 1900 to decriminalise abortion.

During the debate regarding the decriminalisation of abortion in 2019 Constance banned an advertisement on a Newcastle bus. Constance believes that abortion rights must be protected since being legalised, writing in an opinion piece for The Sydney Morning Herald about why he thinks the right to an abortion should be held in high regard.

=== Attempts to enter federal politics ===
On 5 May 2020, he announced that he would resign from the NSW Cabinet and seek Liberal Party preselection for the 2020 Eden-Monaro by-election. However, within 24 hours he reversed what he called "a hasty decision". A contributing factor behind Constance's reconsideration was an abusive text message which he received from then-Deputy Premier of New South Wales, John Barilaro, while Constance was deliberating running for the by-election; Barilaro's message convinced Constance that "politics was stuffed", and he decided not to run. On 8 May, Constance was removed from his role as Leader of the House of the New South Wales Legislative Assembly "as punishment for his spectacular change of heart over quitting state politics".

On 3 October 2021, he announced his intention to quit his state seat to seek Liberal Party preselection for the federal seat of Gilmore at the 2022 federal election He announced he would resign on 26 November 2021, triggering a by-election for the seat of Bega. However, he did not officially resign until 30 December 2021. Constance was preselected as the Liberal candidate for Gilmore on 17 January 2022. At the subsequent election, Constance was narrowly defeated by incumbent MP Fiona Phillips of the Australian Labor Party.

After the death of Senator Jim Molan in January 2023, Constance intended to run for the preselection to fill the Senate casual vacancy caused by Molan's death. Constance made a deal with sections of the Right faction whereby he, if elected, would resign after 18 months to run as the party's candidate for the seat of Gilmore at the next federal election for a second time. However, senior party sources found that many were unhappy with the idea of another resignation. He was endorsed by Berejiklian, Senator Marise Payne and her partner, former state Cabinet minister Stuart Ayres (who was the state member for Penrith until 2023 and a former state deputy leader). He was ultimately defeated in the final vote to Maria Kovacic, with 243 votes compared to Kovacic's 287

On 2 March 2024, it was announced that Constance had won preselection for the seat of Gilmore to recontest the seat. He won the preselection 80–69 beating Paul Ell, a member of the Shoalhaven Council.

On 24 February 2025, Constance stated that the Liberal Party would seek to move away from the Paris climate agreement if elected. During the 2019–2020 Black Summer bushfires Constance believed climate change was a factor in causing the "fire tsunami". Shadow Minister for Climate Change and Energy Ted O'Brien stated that the Coalition has no plans to wind back Australia's international climate commitments and is committed to reaching net-zero emissions.

Constance was defeated by Phillips for a second time at the 2025 Australian federal election, with a 7.56% primary vote decline, and a two-party preferred swing against him of 4.96%. Constance conceded defeat, and confirmed that he would not seek to contest Gilmore for a third time as he would be looking for a job in the corporate sector. In the same press conference, he announced that he had received a coronary artery bypass graft in August 2024. He also opined that the Liberal Party had made mistakes during its election campaign.

== Electoral history ==
=== Preselection results ===
2024 Liberal Party preselections: Gilmore
| Faction | Candidate | Votes | % | ±% |
|---|---|---|---|---|
| Moderate | Andrew Constance | 80 | 53.69 | |
| Liberal (unaligned) | Paul Ell | 69 | 46.30 | |
| Total votes | | 149 | 100.00 | |

2023 Liberal Party preselections: Senate (NSW)
| Faction | Candidate | Votes | % | ±% |
|---|---|---|---|---|
| Moderate | Maria Kovacic | 266 | 52.26 | |
| Moderate | Andrew Constance | 243 | 47.74 | |
| Total votes | | 509 | 100.00 | |

2021 Liberal Party preselections: Gilmore
| Faction | Candidate | Votes | % | ±% |
|---|---|---|---|---|
| Moderate | Andrew Constance | Unopposed | | |

== Post-political career ==
In September 2025, Constance was appointed chief executive officer of the City of Shoalhaven council.

== See also ==
- O'Farrell ministry
- First Baird ministry
- Second Baird ministry
- First Berejiklian ministry
- Second Berejiklian ministry

New South Wales Legislative Assembly
| Preceded by Russell Smith | Member for Bega; 2003–2021 | Succeeded by Michael Holland |
Political offices
| Preceded by Peter Primrose | Minister for Disability Services; 2011–2013 | Succeeded by John Ajaka |
| Preceded by Peter Primrose | Minister for Ageing; 2011–2013 | Succeeded by John Ajaka |
| Preceded by Greg Pearce | Minister for Finance and Services; 2013–2014 | Succeeded by Dominic Perrottet |
| Preceded by Mike Gallacher | Minister for Industrial Relations; 2014–2015 | Succeeded by Gladys Berejiklian |
| Preceded by Mike Baird | Treasurer of New South Wales; 2014–2015 | Succeeded by Gladys Berejiklian |
| Preceded by Mike Baird | Minister for Infrastructure; 2015–2019 | Portfolio abolished |
| Preceded by Gladys Berejiklian | Minister for Transport; 2015–2021 | Succeeded by Rob Stokes |
| Preceded by Melinda Pavey as Minister for Roads, Maritime and Freight | Minister for Roads; 2019–2021 | Succeeded by Rob Stokes |
