= Greg Pearce (politician) =

Australian politician

The Honourable Greg Pearce

Minister for Finance and Services
- In office 3 April 2011 – 1 August 2013
- Succeeded by: Andrew Constance

Minister for the Illawarra
- In office 3 April 2011 – 1 August 2013
- Preceded by: Eric Roozendaal
- Succeeded by: John Ajaka

Member of the Legislative Council of New South Wales
- In office 1 November 2000 – 15 November 2017
- Preceded by: John Hannaford
- Succeeded by: Natalie Ward

Personal details
- Born: 22 January 1955 (age 71) Camperdown, New South Wales
- Party: Liberal Party

Gregory Stephen Pearce (born 22 January 1955), an Australian politician, is a former member of the Legislative Council of New South Wales, representing the Liberal Party from 1 November 2000 to 15 November 2017. He also served as Minister for Finance and Services and Minister for the Illawarra in the O'Farrell ministry from 2011 to 2013.

== Early life and education ==
Pearce was born to parents George Alfred and Margaret Anne Pearce on 22 January 1955 at Camperdown, New South Wales, one of three siblings.

Pearce attended public primary schools at Bundanoon and Wentworth Falls, but later went on to be educated in the Catholic school system at De La Salle Brothers and Benilde High School at Bankstown. He then attended the University of Sydney and obtained a Bachelor of Arts and Bachelor of Laws.

== Career ==
Pearce was admitted as a solicitor on 14 July 1978 and practiced at Freehill, Hollingdale and Page, Solicitors (now known as Freehills) from 1978. He became a partner at the age of 28, and was part of the first international environment law practice in Australia. This led to him attending as a delegate at the Earth Summit in Brazil in 1992. until 2000. He became a Director with Clean Up Australia and then Clean Up the World.

He became the President of the Double Bay Branch of Liberal Party in 1993 and continued in that role until 2000. He was a Member of the CARE Sydney Fundraising Committee between 1999 and 2000, a Councillor on the Law Society of New South Wales between 1999 and 2001.

== Political career ==
He was appointed to the casual vacancy in the Legislative Council of New South Wales on 1 November 2000 following the resignation of John Hannaford. The balance of Hannaford's term was until the start of 2003. He defeated Kerry Jones in the pre-selection battle for the nomination to the vacancy.

He first stood for election in 2003. He was pre-selected as the third on the joint Liberal/National ticket for the Upper House. He was declared elected after obtaining the seventh highest quota in the election.

In Parliament, he has been on the Standing Committee on Law and Justice, Joint Select Committee on the Cross City Tunnel, and the Standing Committee on Social Issues. In 2003 he was Chair of the Opposition Waste Watch Committee until 2005.

He was the Shadow Minister for Finance in 2005 and 2006, the Shadow Minister for Infrastructure in 2005, 2006 and 2007. The Assistant Shadow Minister for Planning in 2006, the Shadow Minister for Commerce in 2006 and 2007, the Shadow Minister for Housing in 2006 and 2007, Shadow Treasurer from 11 April 2007 until 29 December 2008 when Leader of the Opposition Barry O'Farrell conducted a reshuffle of the Shadow Cabinet.

On 3 April 2011, Pearce was appointed Minister for Finance and Services and the Minister for the Illawarra in the O'Farrell ministry.

Despite his removal as Shadow Treasurer, Pearce as Finance Minister was given some of the responsibilities that formerly belonged to Treasurer Mike Baird. In 2013, Pearce was allegedly drunk in parliament and the Premier at the time stated, ''I have spoken with Mr Pearce from Hong Kong this afternoon and conveyed to him this sort of behaviour won't be tolerated.'' The Premiere also stated, ''"I've made it clear to Mr Pearce if this behaviour is repeated, he won't part of my team."

Pearce was dismissed from the cabinet and the ministry on 1 August 2013.

In October 2017, Pearce announced he would resign from the Legislative Council in mid-November. He resigned on 15 November and was replaced by Natalie Ward.

Political offices
Preceded by New portfolio	Minister for Finance and Services; 2011–2013	Succeeded by Andrew Constance
Preceded by Eric Roozendaal	Minister for the Illawarra; 2011–2013	Succeeded by John Ajaka
