= Mike Gallacher =

Australian politician

The Honourable Mike Gallacher

Minister for Police and Emergency Services
- In office 3 April 2011 – 2 May 2014
- Premier: Barry O'Farrell; Mike Baird
- Preceded by: Michael Daley (as Minister for Police); Steve Whan (as Minister for Emergency Services)
- Succeeded by: Stuart Ayres

Minister for the Central Coast
- In office 9 December 2013 – 2 May 2014
- Premier: Barry O'Farrell; Mike Baird
- Preceded by: Chris Hartcher
- Succeeded by: Rob Stokes

Minister for Industrial Relations
- In office 23 April 2014 – 2 May 2014
- Premier: Mike Baird
- Preceded by: Mike Baird
- Succeeded by: Andrew Constance

Minister for the Hunter
- In office 3 April 2011 – 18 December 2013
- Premier: Barry O'Farrell
- Preceded by: Chris Hartcher
- Succeeded by: Rob Stokes

Member of the New South Wales Legislative Council
- In office 17 April 1996 – 6 April 2017
- Preceded by: Stephen Mutch

Personal details
- Born: 27 September 1961 (age 65) Paisley, Scotland, United Kingdom
- Party: Independent (from 2014); Liberal (to 2014)
- Spouse: Judy Gallacher
- Education: University of New England

Michael Joseph Gallacher (born 27 September 1961) is an Australian former politician. He was the Minister for Police and Emergency Services and Vice-president of the Executive Council in the O'Farrell government and Baird government from 2011 to 2014; the Minister for the Central Coast from December 2013 to May 2014; and the Minister for Industrial Relations in the Baird government from April to May 2014. Gallacher has been a member of the New South Wales Legislative Council since 1996. He was the Minister for the Hunter between 2011 and 2014.

In May 2014, Gallacher resigned as Minister after being named in the Independent Commission Against Corruption for alleged involvement in a corrupt scheme to receive illegal political donations. He resigned from parliament in April 2017.

== Early life and background ==
Gallacher was born in Paisley, Scotland, and migrated with his parents to Australia as a young child. He attended school at Lethbridge Park and Shalvey before completing his studies at Randwick Boys High School.

He joined the NSW Police Force in 1980 and served as an officer in general duties, highway patrol, internal police investigations, criminal investigations and special operations. He completed a Bachelor of Professional Studies through the University of New England in 1998. From 1991 to 1994, Gallacher was a delegate to the New South Wales Police Association. He was a senior lecturer in the Police Service's Professional Responsibility Command and qualified for the Police Service Medal.

Gallacher has lived and worked on the Central Coast for over 25 years. He is actively involved in local surf life saving and is also a keen horseman.

Although most members of Gallacher's family had always supported the ALP, Gallacher himself joined the Liberal Party. He credited Labor Attorney-General Frank Walker with having accidentally achieved this political conversion:

"I always say it was Frank Walker, when he was Labor Attorney-General in the Wran government, who turned me into a Liberal. He had an approach to the criminal justice system which favoured the rights of offenders and I want to support the victims of crime and the police who uphold the law."

However, despite this criticism of Walker and different policy positions from him, Gallacher and Walker did eventually associate on friendly terms.

== Political career ==
In 1996, Gallacher was appointed to the New South Wales Legislative Council, filling a casual vacancy caused by the resignation of Stephen Mutch.

Gallacher had won preselection for the vacancy in a field of ten candidates. The other candidates included former Liberal minister Anne Cohen who had lost her lower house seat at the 1995 election and Catherine Cusack who would eventually be elected to the Legislative Council in 2003.

He first faced election at the 2003 state election and was re-elected. In 2005, he was appointed Shadow Minister for Police in the New South Wales Shadow Cabinet and was appointed the portfolio of Shadow Minister for the Hunter in April 2007.

Following the 2011 state election which saw the O'Farrell government come to power, on 3 April 2011 Gallacher was appointed Minister for Police and Emergency Services, Minister for the Hunter, and vice-president of the Executive Council, Leader of the Government in the Legislative Council. In December 2013 Gallacher took on the additional responsibilities as Minister for the Central Coast following the resignation of the incumbent minister, Chris Hartcher. Due to the resignation of Barry O'Farrell as Premier, and the subsequent ministerial reshuffle by Mike Baird, the new Liberal Leader, in April 2014 in addition to his existing responsibilities as a minister, Gallacher was appointed as the Minister for Industrial Relations. The Hunter regional portfolio was assigned to Gladys Berejiklian.

On 2 May 2014, the Independent Commission Against Corruption heard allegations that Gallacher was involved with Chris Hartcher in the establishment of a business called Eightbyfive which sought to conceal prohibited donations to the Liberal Party from a development company owned by Nathan Tinkler. Later that day, Premier Mike Baird announced that Gallacher had resigned from Cabinet. He sat on the crossbench. Prior to his ministerial resignation, it had been reported that Gallacher was interested in moving to the Legislative Assembly with the intent of becoming Liberal Leader one day. Gallacher resigned as an MP in April 2017 to become to CEO of Ports Australia. In October 2019, the Inspector of the Independent Commission Against Corruption appeared at the NSW Parliament's ICAC Oversight Committee and stated that there had been no finding of corrupt conduct against Gallacher, while calling his treatment "wrong and unfair."

Party political offices
Preceded by John Hannaford	Leader of the Opposition of New South Wales in the Legislative Council; 1999–2011	Succeeded by Tony Kelly
Preceded by John Hatzistergos	Leader of the Government in the Legislative Council; 2011–2014	Succeeded by Duncan Gay
Political offices
Preceded by John Hatzistergos	Vice-President of the Executive Council; 2011–2014	Succeeded by Duncan Gay
Preceded by Michael Daley as Minister for Police	Minister for Police and Emergency Services; 2011–2014	Succeeded by Stuart Ayres
Preceded by Steve Whan as Minister for Emergency Services	Minister for Police and Emergency Services; 2011–2014	Succeeded by Stuart Ayres
Preceded by Jodi McKay	Minister for the Hunter; 2011–2013	Succeeded by Gladys Berejiklian
Preceded by Chris Hartcher	Minister for the Central Coast; 2013–2014	Succeeded by Rob Stokes
Preceded by Mike Baird	Minister for Industrial Relations; 2014	Succeeded by Andrew Constance
