= Mike Baird =

Premier of New South Wales from 2014 to 2017

The Honourable Mike Baird AO
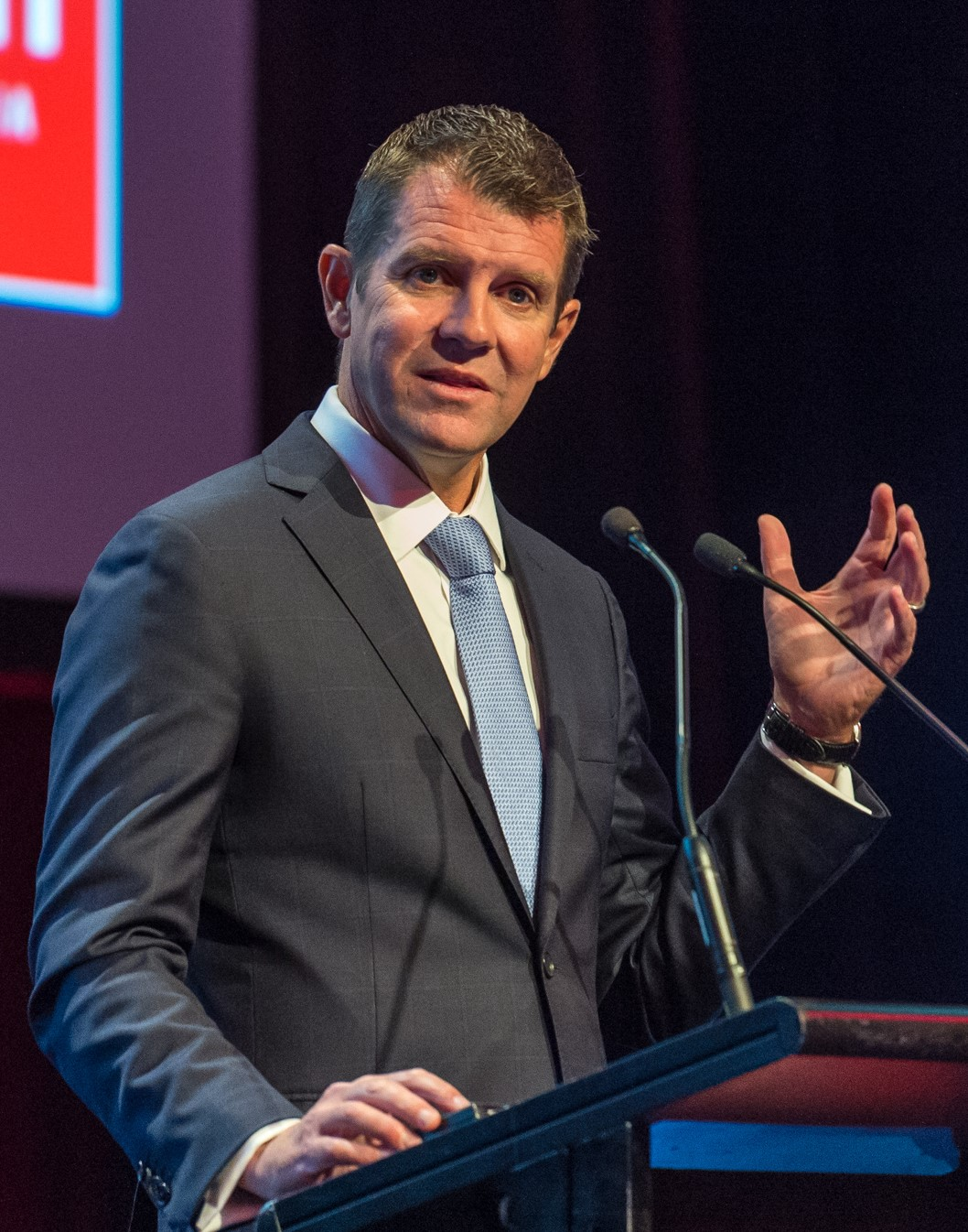
- Baird in 2016

44th Premier of New South Wales
- In office 17 April 2014 – 23 January 2017
- Monarch: Elizabeth II
- Governor: Marie Bashir; David Hurley
- Deputy: Andrew Stoner; Troy Grant; John Barilaro
- Preceded by: Barry O'Farrell
- Succeeded by: Gladys Berejiklian

20th Leader of the New South Wales Liberal Party
- In office 17 April 2014 – 23 January 2017
- Deputy: Gladys Berejiklian
- Preceded by: Barry O'Farrell
- Succeeded by: Gladys Berejiklian

Minister for Infrastructure
- In office 23 April 2014 – 2 April 2015
- Preceded by: Brad Hazzard
- Succeeded by: Andrew Constance

Minister for Western Sydney
- In office 23 April 2014 – 23 January 2017
- Preceded by: Barry O'Farrell
- Succeeded by: Stuart Ayres

Treasurer of New South Wales
- In office 3 April 2011 – 23 April 2014
- Premier: Barry O'Farrell
- Preceded by: Eric Roozendaal
- Succeeded by: Andrew Constance

Member of the New South Wales Parliament for Manly
- In office 24 March 2007 – 23 January 2017
- Preceded by: David Barr
- Succeeded by: James Griffin

Personal details
- Born: Michael Bruce Baird; 1 April 1968 (age 58) Melbourne, Victoria, Australia
- Party: Liberal
- Spouse: Kerryn Baird
- Relations: Bruce Baird (father); Julia Baird (sister)
- Children: 3
- Education: The King's School, Parramatta; University of Sydney; Regent College
- Occupation: Chief Executive Officer of McKinnon Institute; Politician

Michael Bruce Baird (born 1 April 1968) is an Australian investment banker and former politician who was the 44th Premier of New South Wales, the Minister for Infrastructure, the Minister for Western Sydney, and the Leader of the New South Wales Liberal Party from April 2014 to January 2017.

Baird represented the electoral district of Manly in the New South Wales Legislative Assembly for the Liberal Party from 2007 to 2017. Before becoming Premier, he was the Treasurer of New South Wales in the O'Farrell government between 2011 and 2014. On 19 January 2017, Baird announced his intention to step down and on 23 January he resigned as Premier and member for Manly.

== Early life ==
Born in Melbourne, Baird is the son of Judy and Bruce Baird. His father was Deputy Leader of the New South Wales Liberal Party and Member of Parliament representing the electoral district of Northcott, and later a Member of the Australian House of Representatives, representing the Division of Cook, for the Liberal Party. He attended The King's School, Parramatta, and spent time living in the U.S. while his father served as head of the Australian trade commission in New York City. Baird graduated with a Bachelor of Arts with majors in Economics and Government from the University of Sydney in 1989. Baird also studied at Regent College in Vancouver, British Columbia, Canada, initially intending to enter the Anglican ministry, but while there decided to pursue a career in investment banking and later politics.

== Political career ==
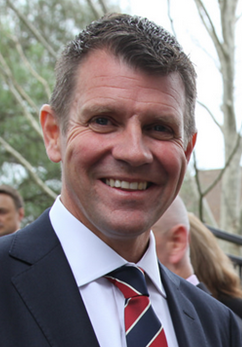
Baird in 2014

In 1999, Baird unsuccessfully sought preselection for the seat of Manly. Baird then returned to investment banking, working for the National Australia Bank for a time in London, before returning to Sydney to work for HSBC Australia. He again sought, this time successfully, Liberal Party preselection for the seat of Manly and went on to defeat the sitting independent member David Barr by 3.4% at the 2007 state election. After initially serving in a range of junior shadow ministries, Baird was promoted to the position of Shadow Treasurer in 2008 and touted as a future Liberal leader.

Following the election of the O'Farrell government in 2011, Baird was appointed Treasurer, although O'Farrell removed some of Baird's ministerial responsibilities, transferring the authority for land tax, gaming tax, payroll tax, public service superannuation and the Office of State Revenue to Greg Pearce, the Minister for Finance and Services. Baird has campaigned against dangerous drinking, voted against embryonic stem research and euthanasia, does not support same-sex marriage or same-sex adoption and has stated that his strongest preference is not to support abortion in most circumstances. He is strongly in favour of Australia becoming a republic. In 2015, he supported calls for increasing the GST to 15%.

== Premier of New South Wales ==
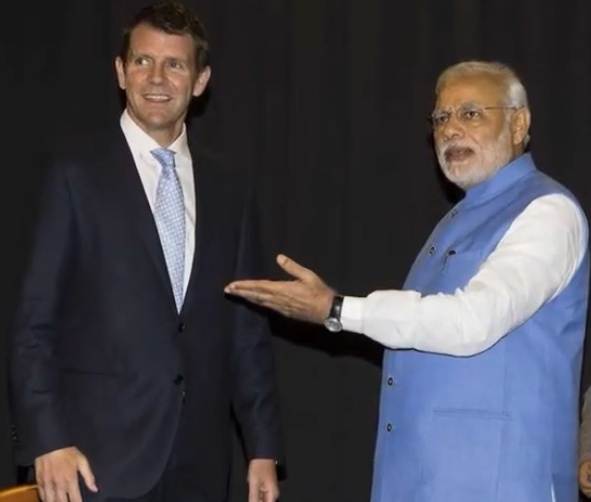
Prime Minister Narendra Modi of India meeting with Mike Baird in Sydney 16 Nov 2014

Following Barry O'Farrell's resignation, Baird was elected unopposed as parliamentary leader of the NSW division of the Liberal Party on 17 April 2014, and subsequently sworn in as the 44th Premier of New South Wales on 23 April by the Governor of New South Wales, Dame Marie Bashir. Just six days later, on April 29, Baird presided over the sale of the Port of Newcastle, with 50% ownership going to the China state owned China Merchants Group. According to the Port Authority, the Port is "Australia’s deepwater global gateway" which " enables Australian businesses to successfully compete in international markets".

He also immediately reshuffled the ministry elevating Andrew Constance into the Treasury portfolio and increasing Andrew Stoner's ministries to five in preparation for the 2015 state election. In October, Stoner resigned as Leader of the NSW Nationals and Deputy Premier of New South Wales and was replaced by Troy Grant. The Sydney Morning Herald described Baird's government as "the most devout in living memory," with a concentration of powerful religious figures in its upper echelons. Baird's chief of staff, Bay Warburton, once said that in his role as chief of staff he is serving Jesus, "and Mike (Baird), who's the Treasurer—he believes he's serving Jesus as the Treasurer of the state. He believes that he has a great opportunity to help people by making responsible decisions about the money from this state."

On the morning of 15 December 2014, a lone gunman, Man Haron Monis, held hostage ten customers and eight employees of a Lindt chocolate café located at Martin Place, Sydney. Baird addressed the media during the stand-off, and stated "we are being tested today... in Sydney. The police are being tested, the public is being tested, but whatever the test we will face it head on and we will remain a strong democratic, civil society. I have full confidence in the Police Commissioner and the incredible work of the NSW police force." On 20 March 2015, Baird met with staff at the re-opened café, stating the staff and company: "...Are saying that they want to be strong for their friends, they want to be strong for this city and state". Baird suffered from post-traumatic stress following the attack.

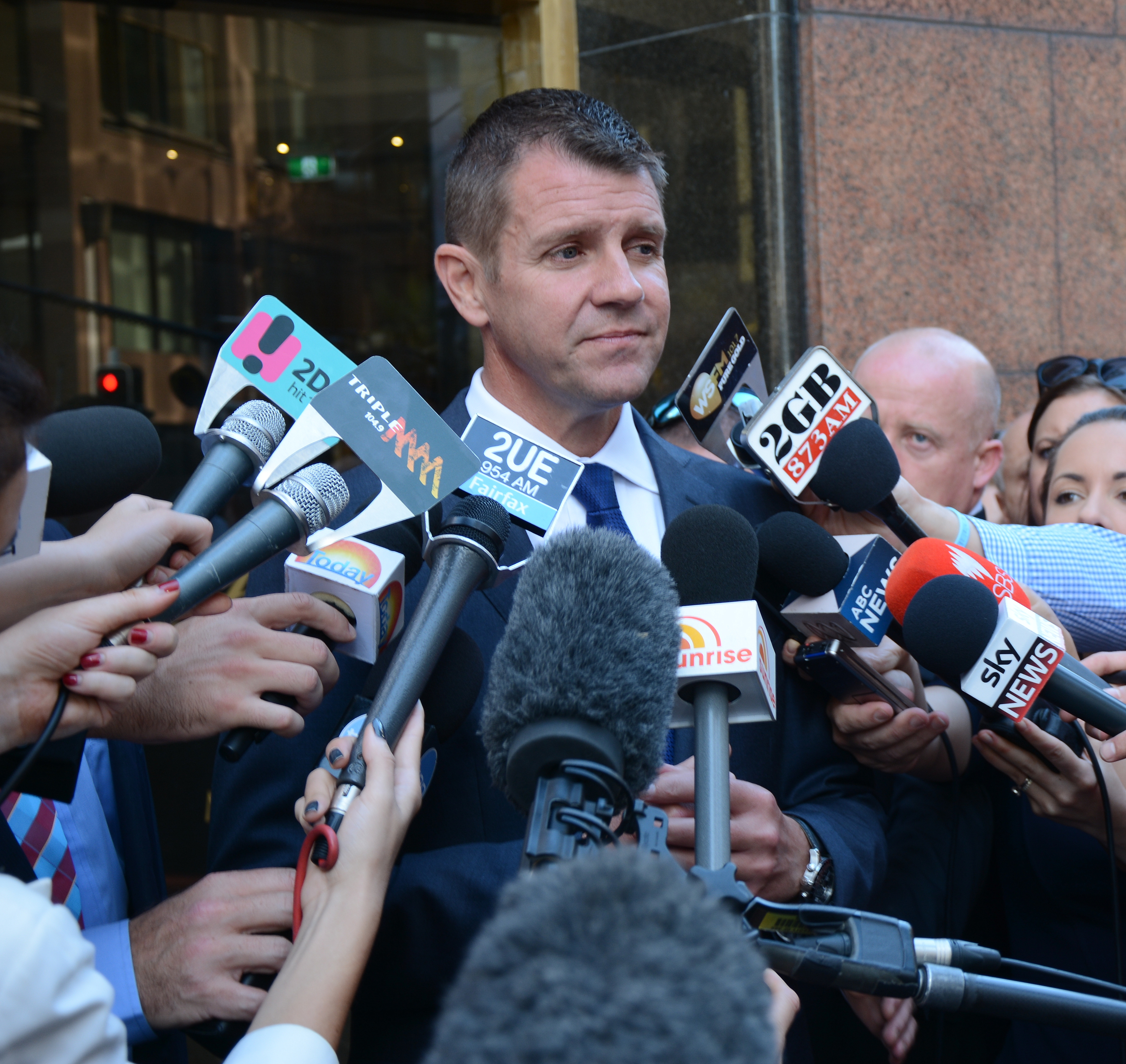
Baird at the official reopening of the Lindt Café, Martin Place, Sydney, March 2015.

=== 2015 New South Wales election ===
At the 2015 election, Baird led the Liberal-National Coalition to a second term. The main policy that dominated the election was Baird's unpopular policy to lease 49% of the state's electricity distribution network, known as the "poles and wires" in the form of a 99-year lease to the private sector and use the proceeds to invest in new road, public transport, water, health and education infrastructure. Other regional policies centred around the Baird Government's truncation of the Central Coast & Newcastle Railway Line at Wickham and its replacement with the $130 million light rail system and associated transport interchange as part of a broader revitalisation of the Newcastle city centre. Coal Seam Gas was a likewise major regional issue in northern New South Wales.

Ultimately, Baird won a full term, though he lost 15 seats from the massive majority he'd inherited from O'Farrell. Baird is only the fourth state Liberal leader, after Sir Robert Askin, Nick Greiner and O'Farrell, to win an election in New South Wales since the main non-Labor party adopted the Liberal banner in 1945. It also marked the first time since 1973 that a non-Labor government had retained its majority at an election and Baird became the first non-elected Liberal Premier to be elected in his own right.

=== Approval rating ===
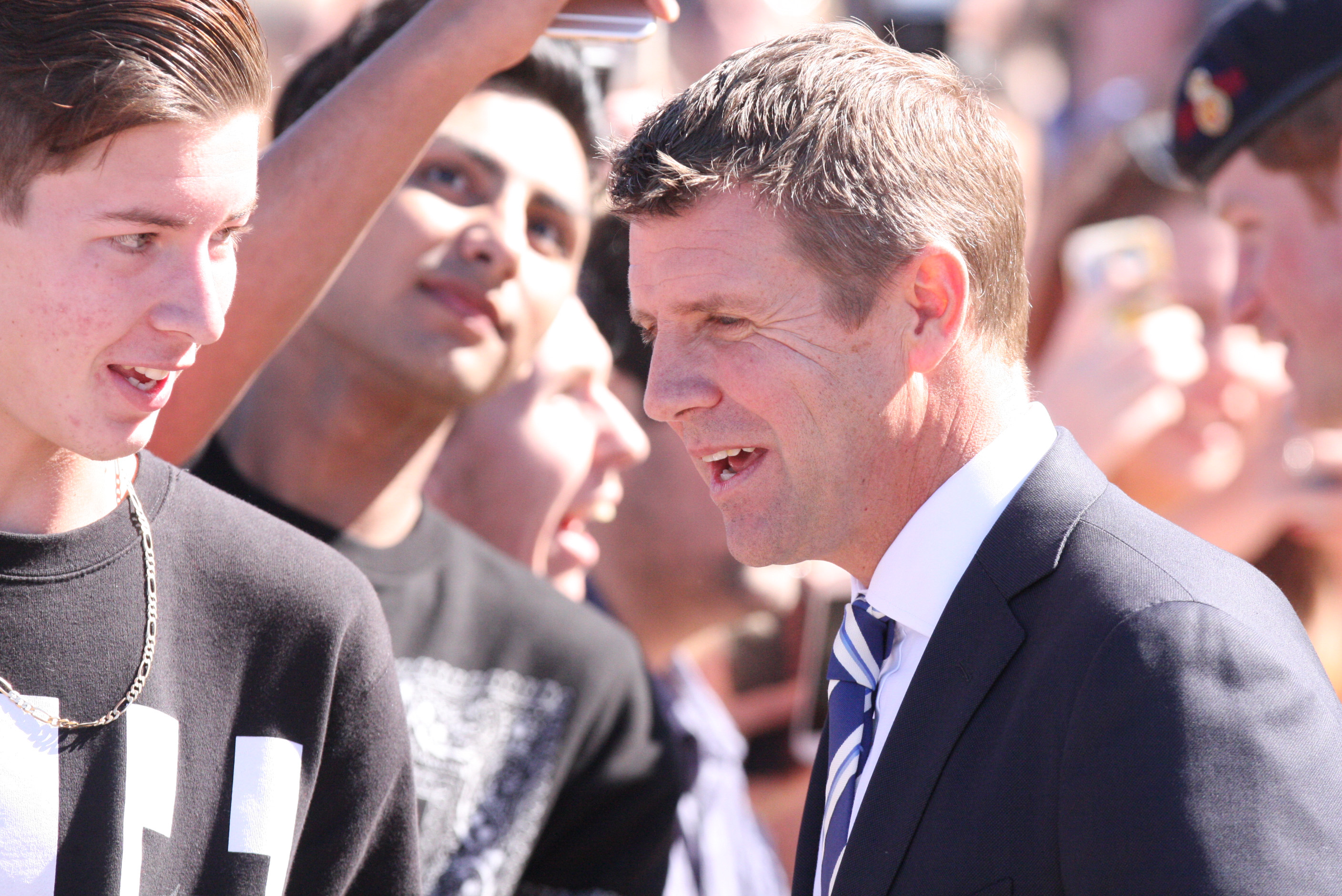
Baird greeting the public, May 2015

After replacing Barry O'Farrell as Premier in April 2014, Baird initially fared well in statewide opinion polls but his approval rating collapsed in the 2nd half of 2016. From December 2015 to September 2016, Baird's satisfaction rating fell by 46 points—"the biggest fall in net satisfaction of any mainland state premier in the history of Newspoll".

Newspoll Satisfaction Rating of Mike Baird
	Satisfied	Dissatisfied
September 2016	39%	46%
September 2015	63%	23%
March 2015	57%	29%
February 2015	59%	26%
December 2014	60%	22%
October 2014	56%	20%
August 2014	49%	23%
June 2014	49%	19%

=== Lockout laws ===
Baird had publicly advocated for the tough Sydney lockout laws and on 9 February 2016 posted a Facebook response to an article published by Matt Barrie condemning the Premier's actions. Baird's response gained international attention after the post received over 10,000 likes - along with more than 10,000 comments that were mostly critical of the Premier's stance on the laws. Baird's reputation as a "darling of social media" was tarnished as the hashtag #casinomike became the number one trending topic nationwide on Twitter in reference to lockout laws not applying to Star City Casino, as it is located outside the entertainment and CBD precincts where the laws apply. A protest was organised in response to Baird's comments by community group Keep Sydney Open on 21 February 2016, with over 15,000 people marching in Sydney's CBD and calling on the Baird government to abolish the lockout laws.

=== Council mergers ===
In December 2015, the Baird government announced a plan to cut the number of councils in New South Wales from 152 to 112, including the number of Sydney councils from 43 to 25 and the number of regional councils from 109 to 87. This resulted in a delay of local government elections from September 2016 to March 2017. On 12 May 2016, 19 council mergers took place.

=== Greyhound ban ===
In May 2015, in response to a Four Corners exposé on the industry, Baird announced an inquiry into the greyhound racing industry. In July 2016, he announced the government's intention to ban the use of greyhound dogs for racing purposes. This decision was reversed in October 2016.

=== Resignation ===
On 19 January 2017, Baird announced he was retiring from politics, with his resignation to be effective after a leadership spill the following week. He said, "I have made clear from the beginning that I was in politics to make a difference, and then move on. After 10 years in public life, this moment for me has arrived." Following his decision to resign, he was criticised for his failure to listen on key issues such as protests against the WestConnex, lockout laws and local government amalgamations. Baird also reversed an earlier decision to ban greyhound racing in the face of significant community pressure, especially from the Nationals. On 23 January 2017, he formally resigned as both premier and member for Manly, and Gladys Berejiklian was sworn in as New South Wales' 45th premier.

== After politics ==
In February 2017, Baird was appointed Chief Customer Officer at National Australia Bank. He was paid a total of A$2.29 million in 2018. In 2019, NAB executives forfeited their short-term bonuses, resulting in Baird earning the lesser total of A$1.7 million for that year. At the end of the 2018/2019 financial year, Baird held A$500,000 of NAB stock as well as 67,888 NAB performance rights, worth A$1.59 million as of March 2020. In March 2020, it was reported that he would leave the company on 15 April 2020. In April 2020, Baird was appointed Chief Executive Officer of HammondCare, a Christian aged care provider of palliative and dementia care.

In October 2021, Baird gave evidence to the Independent Commission Against Corruption regarding Gladys Berejiklian's relationship with disgraced Liberal MP Daryl Maguire. After leaving the ICAC, Baird stated he was "devastated" to have to give evidence about Berejiklian, who he described as a "close personal friend".

In December 2024, Baird announced that he would be moving to Melbourne for work commitments, having joined the McKinnon Institute as its CEO and Chair in August that year.

In 2020, Baird joined the board of Cricket Australia. He was elevated to Cricket Australia chair in February 2023.

In January 2024, Baird was appointed to the board of KPMG. He resigned from the board in September 2025.

Baird was appointed as the Group CEO of the NRMA in April 2026.

== Personal life ==
Baird lives in Fairlight in Sydney’s northern beaches and is married to wife Kerryn. Together they have three children; Laura, Cate and Luke. His mother, Judy, who died in 2021 was in full-time care at the time of his appointment as CEO of Hammond Care. His sister is journalist Julia Baird, former presenter of ABC's The Drum TV program and a bestselling author. His younger brother, Steve Baird, is the CEO of International Justice Mission Australia. Baird is a long time friend of former Australian prime minister Tony Abbott and they regularly surf together off the Northern Beaches. Baird is a supporter of NRL club the Manly Warringah Sea Eagles.

== In popular culture ==
In 2016, Sydney DJ Tom Budin released a song named "Mike Baird", which mocked and protested against the Sydney lockout laws, which were introduced in February 2014, two months before Baird became the Premier of New South Wales.

== See also ==
- Baird ministry
- O'Farrell ministry
- Shadow Ministry of Barry O'Farrell

New South Wales Legislative Assembly
Preceded by David Barr	Member for Manly; 2007–2017	Succeeded by James Griffin
Political offices
Preceded by Eric Roozendaal	Treasurer of New South Wales; 2011–2014	Succeeded by Andrew Constance
Preceded by Brad Hazzard as Minister for Planning and Infrastructure	Minister for Infrastructure; 2014–2015	Succeeded by Andrew Constance as Minister for Transport and Infrastructure
Preceded by Barry O'Farrell	Premier of New South Wales; 2014–2017	Succeeded by Gladys Berejiklian
Preceded by Barry O'Farrell	Minister for Western Sydney; 2014–2017	Succeeded by Stuart Ayres
Party political offices
Preceded by Barry O'Farrell	Leader of the New South Wales Liberal Party; 2014–2017	Succeeded by Gladys Berejiklian
