= Electoral results for the district of Auburn =

Election results for Auburn, New South Wales, Australia

Auburn, an electoral district of the Legislative Assembly in the Australian state of New South Wales, was established in 1927.

== Members ==
Election	Member	Party
1927	Jack Lang	Labor
1930	Jack Lang	Labor
1932	Jack Lang	Labor (NSW)
1935	Jack Lang	Labor (NSW)
1938	Jack Lang	Labor / Labor (N-C)
1941	Jack Lang	Labor
1943 by	Jack Lang	Lang Labor
1944	Jack Lang	Lang Labor
1946 by	Chris Lang	Lang Labor
1947	Chris Lang	Lang Labor
1950	Edgar Dring	Labor
1953	Edgar Dring	Labor
1956	Thomas Ryan	Labor
1959	Thomas Ryan	Labor
1962	Thomas Ryan	Labor
1965	Peter Cox	Labor
1968	Peter Cox	Labor
1971	Peter Cox	Labor
1973	Peter Cox	Labor
1976	Peter Cox	Labor
1978	Peter Cox	Labor
1981	Peter Cox	Labor
1984	Peter Cox	Labor
1988	Peter Nagle	Labor
1991	Peter Nagle	Labor
1995	Peter Nagle	Labor
1999	Peter Nagle	Labor
2001 by	Barbara Perry	Labor
2003	Barbara Perry	Labor
2007	Barbara Perry	Labor
2011	Barbara Perry	Labor
2015	Luke Foley	Labor
2019	Lynda Voltz	Labor
2023	Lynda Voltz	Labor

== Election results ==
=== 2023 ===
2023 New South Wales state election: Auburn
Party	Candidate	Votes	%	±%
Labor	Lynda Voltz	28,167	60.1	+6.0
Liberal	Haseen Zaman	9,327	19.9	−11.3
Greens	Masoomeh Asgari	3,237	6.9	+0.0
Liberal Democrats	Julie Morkos Douaihy	3,162	6.7	+6.7
	Jamal Daoud	1,733	3.7	+3.7
Sustainable Australia	Shelley Goed	1,227	2.6	+2.6
Total formal votes		46,853	93.4	−0.4
Informal votes		3,286	6.6	+0.4
Turnout		50,139	84.8	+0.5
Two-party-preferred result
Labor	Lynda Voltz	30,701	74.0	+10.3
Liberal	Haseen Zaman	10,793	26.0	−10.3
Labor hold		Swing	+10.3	

=== Elections in the 2010s ===
==== 2019 ====
2019 New South Wales state election: Auburn
Party	Candidate	Votes	%	±%
Labor	Lynda Voltz	22,396	49.94	+5.40
Liberal	Kyoung Hee (Christina) Kang	16,094	35.89	+0.55
Greens	Janet Castle	3,357	7.49	+1.42
Independent	Luke Ahern	1,635	3.65	+3.65
Keep Sydney Open	Kieron Lee	1,360	3.03	+3.03
Total formal votes		44,842	93.97	−0.50
Informal votes		2,875	6.03	+0.50
Turnout		47,717	86.23	−0.78
Two-party-preferred result
Labor	Lynda Voltz	24,419	59.13	+3.20
Liberal	Kyoung Hee (Christina) Kang	16,876	40.87	−3.20
Labor hold		Swing	+3.20	

==== 2015 ====
2015 New South Wales state election: Auburn
Party	Candidate	Votes	%	±%
Labor	Luke Foley	19,504	44.5	−1.0
Liberal	Ronney Oueik	15,471	35.3	+1.9
Greens	Malikeh Michels	2,658	6.1	−0.4
Independent	Paul Garrard	2,457	5.6	+5.6
No Land Tax	Kays Ahmed	1,857	4.2	+4.2
Christian Democrats	Raema Walker	1,836	4.2	−0.5
Total formal votes		43,783	94.5	+0.1
Informal votes		2,560	5.5	−0.1
Turnout		46,343	87.0	+0.6
Two-party-preferred result
Labor	Luke Foley	21,343	55.9	−1.3
Liberal	Ronney Oueik	16,816	44.1	+1.3
Labor hold		Swing	−1.3	

==== 2011 ====
2011 New South Wales state election: Auburn
Party	Candidate	Votes	%	±%
Labor	Barbara Perry	20,377	46.3	−14.0
Liberal	Ned Attie	14,159	32.2	+17.8
Greens	Michael Kiddle	2,969	6.7	+2.7
Independent	Salim Mehajer	2,964	6.7	+6.7
Christian Democrats	Raema Walker	2,323	5.3	+1.4
Social Justice Network	Jamal Daoud	759	1.7	+1.7
Socialist Equality	Carolyn Kennett	477	1.1	+1.1
Total formal votes		44,028	95.0	−0.8
Informal votes		2,318	5.0	+0.8
Turnout		46,346	90.9	−1.0
Two-party-preferred result
Labor	Barbara Perry	22,199	58.5	−20.3
Liberal	Ned Attie	15,758	41.5	+20.3
Labor hold		Swing	−20.3	

=== Elections in the 2000s ===
==== 2007 ====
2007 New South Wales state election: Auburn
Party	Candidate	Votes	%	±%
Labor	Barbara Perry	24,314	60.3	+0.7
Liberal	George Pierides	5,771	14.3	−2.4
Unity	Jack Au	3,866	9.6	+2.4
Greens	Malikeh Michaels	1,621	4.0	−4.3
Christian Democrats	Allan Lotfizadeh	1,582	3.9	+1.1
Independent	Mamdouh Habib	1,554	3.9	+3.9
Democrats	Silma Ihram	1,087	2.7	+1.3
Independent	Bob Vinnicombe	536	1.3	+1.3
Total formal votes		42,331	95.8	+0.2
Informal votes		1,775	4.2	−0.2
Turnout		42,106	91.9	
Two-party-preferred result
Labor	Barbara Perry	27,095	78.7	+2.2
Liberal	George Pierides	7,312	21.3	−2.2
Labor hold		Swing	+2.2	

==== 2003 ====
2003 New South Wales state election: Auburn
Party	Candidate	Votes	%	±%
Labor	Barbara Perry	24,764	60.8	+1.3
Liberal	Levent Emirali	6,619	16.2	−3.5
Greens	Steve Maxwell	3,349	8.2	+6.4
Unity	Shui Au	2,697	6.6	−0.8
Christian Democrats	Greg Kaitanovich	1,122	2.8	+2.8
One Nation	Kane O'Connor	811	2.0	−4.2
Democrats	Keith Darley	593	1.4	−1.4
AAFI	Dale Francis	435	1.1	−0.5
Legal System Reform	Thoria Yagoub	201	0.5	+0.5
Socialist Alliance	Roberto Jorquera	172	0.4	−0.5
Total formal votes		40,763	95.6	−0.7
Informal votes		1,895	4.4	+0.7
Turnout		42,658	92.1	
Two-party-preferred result
Labor	Barbara Perry	26,873	77.3	+3.0
Liberal	Levent Emirali	7,911	22.7	−3.0
Labor hold		Swing	+3.0	

==== 2001 by-election ====
2001 Auburn by-election Saturday 8 September
Party	Candidate	Votes	%	±%
Labor	Barbara Perry	17,690	46.57	−12.92
Liberal	Judy Irvine	8,499	22.38	−3.35
Unity	Le Lam	3,792	9.98	+2.56
Independent	Mohamed Saddick	2,581	6.79	
Unaffiliated	Bob Vinnicombe	1,741	4.58	
Democrats	Colin McDermott	903	2.38	−0.44
Greens	Steve Maxwell	845	2.22	+0.38
Independent	Kim Appleby	744	1.96	
Unaffiliated	Bala Balendra	616	1.62	
Christian Democrats	David Barker	501	1.32	
Independent	Caleb Barker	72	0.19	
Total formal votes		37,984	96.93	+0.67
Informal votes		1,204	3.07	−0.67
Turnout		39,188	85.51	−8.11
Two-party-preferred result
Labor	Barbara Perry	19,600	63.14	−11.13
Liberal	Judy Irvine	11,443	36.86	+11.13
Labor hold		Swing	−11.13	

Peter Nagle (Labor) resigned.

=== Elections in the 1990s ===
==== 1999 ====
1999 New South Wales state election: Auburn
Party	Candidate	Votes	%	±%
Labor	Peter Nagle	24,207	59.5	−4.4
Liberal	Bulent Borluk	8,031	19.7	−10.6
Unity	Fatia Yakup	3,021	7.4	+7.4
One Nation	Kane O'Connor	2,536	6.2	+6.2
Democrats	Colin McDermott	1,148	2.8	+2.6
Greens	Geoff Ash	749	1.8	+1.8
AAFI	Chris Johnson	620	1.5	+1.5
Democratic Socialist	Shane Bentley	378	0.9	+0.9
Total formal votes		40,690	96.3	+3.9
Informal votes		1,581	3.7	−3.9
Turnout		42,271	93.6	
Two-party-preferred result
Labor	Peter Nagle	27,158	74.3	+7.1
Liberal	Bulent Borluk	9,409	25.7	−7.1
Labor hold		Swing	+7.1	

==== 1995 ====
1995 New South Wales state election: Auburn
Party	Candidate	Votes	%	±%
Labor	Peter Nagle	21,171	64.0	+2.2
Liberal	Camille Harb	9,945	30.1	+2.1
Call to Australia	Douglas Morrison	1,150	3.5	+3.5
Natural Law	Peter Catts	805	2.4	+2.4
Total formal votes		33,071	92.3	+6.8
Informal votes		2,765	7.7	−6.8
Turnout		35,836	93.8	−0.6
Two-party-preferred result
Labor	Peter Nagle	21,887	67.4	−0.7
Liberal	Camille Harb	10,587	32.6	+0.7
Labor hold		Swing	−0.7	

==== 1991 ====
1991 New South Wales state election: Auburn
Party	Candidate	Votes	%	±%
Labor	Peter Nagle	18,528	61.8	+13.0
Liberal	Fahmi Hussain	8,391	28.0	+0.7
Democrats	Marcus Weyland	1,720	5.7	+5.7
Independent	Ed Dogramaci	1,357	4.5	+4.5
Total formal votes		29,996	85.5	−9.9
Informal votes		5,076	14.5	+9.9
Turnout		35,072	94.4	
Two-party-preferred result
Labor	Peter Nagle	19,793	68.1	+9.2
Liberal	Fahmi Hussain	9,290	31.9	−9.2
Labor hold		Swing	+9.2	

=== Elections in the 1980s ===
==== 1988 ====
1988 New South Wales state election: Auburn
Party	Candidate	Votes	%	±%
Labor	Peter Nagle	14,186	48.3	−21.7
Liberal	Virginia Schrader	6,618	22.5	−7.5
Independent EFF	Terrence Keegan	5,661	19.3	+19.3
Independent EFF	John Hadchiti	2,908	9.9	+9.9
Total formal votes		29,373	94.7	−1.2
Informal votes		1,645	5.3	+1.2
Turnout		31,018	94.0	
Two-party-preferred result
Labor	Peter Nagle	16,359	60.7	−9.3
Liberal	Virginia Schrader	10,589	39.3	+9.3
Labor hold		Swing	−9.3	

==== 1984 ====
1984 New South Wales state election: Auburn
Party	Candidate	Votes	%	±%
Labor	Peter Cox	17,831	66.8	−3.5
Liberal	Rudolph Ognibene	8,856	33.2	+3.5
Total formal votes		26,687	95.9	+0.5
Informal votes		1,142	4.1	−0.5
Turnout		27,829	92.7	+1.3
Labor hold		Swing	−3.5	

==== 1981 ====
1981 New South Wales state election: Auburn
Party	Candidate	Votes	%	±%
Labor	Peter Cox	18,537	70.3	−3.2
Liberal	David Lynam	7,840	29.7	+5.4
Total formal votes		26,377	95.4	
Informal votes		1,262	4.6	
Turnout		27,639	91.4	
Labor hold		Swing	−4.8	

=== Elections in the 1970s ===
==== 1978 ====
1978 New South Wales state election: Auburn
Party	Candidate	Votes	%	±%
Labor	Peter Cox	23,636	76.5	+11.2
Liberal	Maree Lloyd	6,596	21.3	−13.4
Communist	Aileen Beaver	661	2.1	+2.1
Total formal votes		30,893	97.0	−0.4
Informal votes		941	3.0	+0.4
Turnout		31,834	93.6	−1.0
Two-party-preferred result
Labor	Peter Cox	24,204	78.4	+13.1
Liberal	Maree Lloyd	6,686	21.6	−13.1
Labor hold		Swing	+13.1	

==== 1976 ====
1976 New South Wales state election: Auburn
Party	Candidate	Votes	%	±%
Labor	Peter Cox	20,955	65.3	+2.5
Liberal	Stephen Sim	11,132	34.7	+3.9
Total formal votes		32,087	97.4	+0.4
Informal votes		856	2.6	−0.4
Turnout		32,943	94.6	+0.9
Labor hold		Swing	+1.2	

==== 1973 ====
1973 New South Wales state election: Auburn
Party	Candidate	Votes	%	±%
Labor	Peter Cox	19,371	62.8	−4.9
Liberal	Arthur Deane	9,480	30.8	−1.5
Democratic Labor	Christopher Carroll	1,979	6.4	+6.4
Total formal votes		30,830	97.0	
Informal votes		960	3.0	
Turnout		31,790	93.7	
Two-party-preferred result
Labor	Peter Cox	19,767	64.1	−3.6
Liberal	Arthur Deane	11,063	35.9	+3.6
Labor hold		Swing	−3.6	

==== 1971 ====
1971 New South Wales state election: Auburn
Party	Candidate	Votes	%	±%
Labor	Peter Cox	17,074	67.7	+3.2
Liberal	William McIntyre	8,150	32.3	−3.2
Total formal votes		25,224	97.6	
Informal votes		609	2.4	
Turnout		25,833	94.2	
Labor hold		Swing	+3.2	

=== Elections in the 1960s ===
==== 1968 ====
1968 New South Wales state election: Auburn
Party	Candidate	Votes	%	±%
Labor	Peter Cox	16,784	64.5	+5.6
Liberal	Gregory Ricardo	9,230	35.5	−5.6
Total formal votes		26,014	97.1	
Informal votes		783	2.9	
Turnout		26,797	94.7	
Labor hold		Swing	+5.6	

==== 1965 ====
1965 New South Wales state election: Auburn
Party	Candidate	Votes	%	±%
Labor	Peter Cox	14,804	59.0	−5.9
Liberal	Neil Davis	10,310	41.0	+5.9
Total formal votes		25,114	98.0	−0.7
Informal votes		507	2.0	+0.7
Turnout		25,621	94.6	−0.7
Labor hold		Swing	−5.9	

==== 1962 ====
1962 New South Wales state election: Auburn
Party	Candidate	Votes	%	±%
Labor	Thomas Ryan	16,430	64.9	+0.3
Liberal	Robert Leech	8,877	35.1	−0.3
Total formal votes		25,307	98.7	
Informal votes		333	1.3	
Turnout		25,640	95.3	
Labor hold		Swing	+0.3	

=== Elections in the 1950s ===
==== 1959 ====
1959 New South Wales state election: Auburn
Party	Candidate	Votes	%	±%
Labor	Thomas Ryan	15,321	64.6	
Liberal	John Steel	8,396	35.4	
Total formal votes		23,717	98.1	
Informal votes		460	1.9	
Turnout		24,177	94.9	
Labor hold		Swing		

==== 1956 ====
1956 New South Wales state election: Auburn
Party	Candidate	Votes	%	±%
Labor	Thomas Ryan	8,430	42.0	−20.0
Liberal	John Steel	5,904	29.4	+29.4
Lang Labor	Chris Lang	5,263	26.2	−11.8
Independent	Edward Spensley	461	2.3	+2.3
Total formal votes		20,058	98.2	+2.1
Informal votes		365	1.8	−2.1
Turnout		20,423	94.3	−0.1
Two-party-preferred result
Labor	Thomas Ryan	13,177	65.7	+3.7
Liberal	John Steel	6,881	34.3	+34.3
Labor hold		Swing	N/A	

==== 1953 ====
1953 New South Wales state election: Auburn
Party	Candidate	Votes	%	±%
Labor	Edgar Dring	12,095	62.0	
Lang Labor	Chris Lang	7,406	38.0	
Total formal votes		19,501	96.1	
Informal votes		786	3.9	
Turnout		20,287	94.4	
Labor hold		Swing		

==== 1950 ====
1950 New South Wales state election: Auburn
Party	Candidate	Votes	%	±%
Labor	Edgar Dring	10,151	42.3	
Lang Labor	Chris Lang	5,815	24.2	
Liberal	James Dennison	5,683	23.7	
Independent	Alexander Kerr	1,808	7.5	
Communist	Roy Kirby	536	2.2	
Total formal votes		23,993	96.2	
Informal votes		953	3.8	
Turnout		24,946	93.4	
Two-candidate-preferred result
Labor	Edgar Dring	13,556	56.5	
Lang Labor	Chris Lang	10,437	43.5	
Labor gain from Lang Labor		Swing		

=== Elections in the 1940s ===
==== 1947 ====
1947 New South Wales state election: Auburn
Party	Candidate	Votes	%	±%
Lang Labor	Chris Lang	10,263	46.2	−19.6
Labor	Frank Peffer	6,160	27.8	−6.4
Independent	Alexander Kerr	4,929	22.2	+22.2
Communist	Stanley Roy	849	3.8	+3.8
Total formal votes		22,201	97.2	+1.1
Informal votes		648	2.8	−1.1
Turnout		22,849	95.4	+2.3
Two-candidate-preferred result
Lang Labor	Chris Lang	12,357	55.7	−10.1
Labor	Frank Peffer	9,844	44.3	+10.1
Lang Labor hold		Swing	−10.1	

==== 1946 by-election ====
1946 Auburn state by-election
Party	Candidate	Votes	%	±%
Lang Labor	Chris Lang	11,064	52.32	−13.45
Labor	Frank Peffer	7,965	37.67	+3.44
Independent Liberal	Edward Felsch	2,117	10.01	+10.01
Total formal votes		21,146	98.62	+2.52
Informal votes		295	1.38	−2.52
Turnout		21,441	87.61	−5.52
Lang Labor hold		Swing	−13.45	

==== 1944 ====
1944 New South Wales state election: Auburn
Party	Candidate	Votes	%	±%
Lang Labor	Jack Lang	12,871	65.8	+65.8
Labor	Patrick Mooney	6,699	34.2	−35.5
Total formal votes		19,570	96.1	+2.0
Informal votes		794	3.9	−2.0
Turnout		20,364	93.1	−0.5
Member changed to Lang Labor from Labor		Swing	N/A	

- Jack Lang was the sitting MP for Auburn, who won the previous election as a Labor candidate.

==== 1943 by-election ====
1943 Auburn state by-election
Party	Candidate	Votes	%	±%
Lang Labor	Jack Lang	10,779	57.89	−11.77 (Note: Compared to Labor at the 1941 state election.)
Labor	Gordon Byrne	5,346	28.71	−40.95
Independent	Edward Spensley	2,495	13.40	+13.40
Total formal votes		18,620	98.37	+4.30
Informal votes		308	1.63	−4.30
Turnout		18,928	83.98	−9.58
Member changed to Lang Labor from Labor				

==== 1941 ====
1941 New South Wales state election: Auburn
Party	Candidate	Votes	%	±%
Labor	Jack Lang	12,960	69.7	
State Labor	Clarence Campbell	5,645	30.3	
Total formal votes		18,605	94.1	
Informal votes		1,173	5.9	
Turnout		19,778	93.6	
Labor hold		Swing		

=== Elections in the 1930s ===
==== 1938 ====
1938 New South Wales state election: Auburn
Party	Candidate	Votes	%	±%
Labor	Jack Lang	10,771	59.2	+2.6
Industrial Labor	Jack Hooke	7,416	40.8	+40.8
Total formal votes		18,187	95.2	−3.1
Informal votes		906	4.8	+3.1
Turnout		19,093	95.9	−0.4
Labor hold		Swing	N/A	

==== 1935 ====
1935 New South Wales state election: Auburn
Party	Candidate	Votes	%	±%
Labor (NSW)	Jack Lang	10,316	56.6	+4.6
Federal Labor	Ben Chifley	7,916	43.4	+3.5
Total formal votes		18,232	98.3	+0.7
Informal votes		321	1.7	−0.7
Turnout		18,553	96.3	+0.3
Labor (NSW) hold		Swing	N/A	

==== 1932 ====
1932 New South Wales state election: Auburn
Party	Candidate	Votes	%	±%
Labor (NSW)	Jack Lang	9,233	52.0	−23.8
Federal Labor	Percy Coleman	7,075	39.9	+39.9
United Australia	Phillip Wilkins	1,316	7.4	−14.9
Communist	Lawrence Sharkey	112	0.6	−0.5
Independent	Theodore McLennan	19	0.1	+0.1
Total formal votes		17,755	97.6	+0.3
Informal votes		431	2.4	−0.3
Turnout		18,186	96.0	+0.3
Labor (NSW) hold		Swing	N/A	

==== 1930 ====
1930 New South Wales state election: Auburn
Party	Candidate	Votes	%	±%
Labor	Jack Lang	13,174	75.8	
Nationalist	Sidney Massey	3,885	22.3	
Communist	Herbert Moxon	198	1.1	
Independent	Harry Meatheringham	126	0.7	
Total formal votes		17,383	97.3	
Informal votes		489	2.7	
Turnout		17,872	95.7	
Labor hold		Swing		

=== Elections in the 1920s ===
==== 1927 ====
1927 New South Wales state election: Auburn
Party	Candidate	Votes	%	±%
Labor	Jack Lang	9,429	61.2	
Independent Labor	Patrick Minahan (defeated)	3,153	20.5	
Independent	Tom Cheetham	2,821	18.3	
Total formal votes		15,403	98.8	
Informal votes		190	1.2	
Turnout		15,593	84.6	
Labor win		(new seat)		
