= Salim Mehajer =

Australian convicted criminal and property developer (born 1986)

Deputy Mayor of Auburn
- In office 8 September 2012 – 29 January 2016
- Mayor: Ned Attie; Hicham Zraika; Ronney Oueik; Le Lam
- Preceded by: Jack Au
- Succeeded by: Council suspended

Member of the Auburn City Council
- In office 8 September 2012 – 29 January 2016
- Constituency: First Ward

Personal details
- Born: Salim Mehajer Sydney, Australia
- Party: Independent
- Education: Trinity Catholic College; Arthur Phillip High School
- Alma mater: Western Sydney University
- Occupation: Property developer (Self–employed); Politician

Salim Mehajer (born 12 June 1986) is a Lebanese Australian convicted criminal, property developer and former deputy mayor of Auburn City Council. In March 2018, Mehajer was declared bankrupt and in April 2018 was found guilty of electoral fraud, and sentenced to 21 months in prison with a non-parole period of 11 months. In April 2021, he was sentenced to 2 years and 3 months for lying to court. In May 2023, he was sentenced to seven years and nine months for domestic violence and fraud offences, with a non-parole period of three-and-a-half years. He was released on parole on 18 July 2025.

== Early life and education ==
Mehajer was born in Sydney, and is the third-eldest of eight children of Lebanese immigrants Amal and Mohamed Mehajer. He grew up in the Auburn area and was educated at the local primary school before attending Trinity Catholic College, Auburn for the majority of his high school years. Mehajer finished his final years at Arthur Phillip High School in Parramatta and subsequently studied at Western Sydney University, graduating with a Bachelor of Housing degree in April 2010.

Mehajer was featured in an advertisement in the Auburn Review, paid for by the not-for-profit Australian Community Association of which Mehajer was president at the time, which states he also attained a Masters of Environmental Systems, Markets and Climate Change. However, although he enrolled in an environmental engineering course at the University of New England (UNE), a spokesperson from UNE stated that he never completed it. Mehajer has also claimed to have intended to commence pursuing medical studies and to become a doctor specializing in mental health.

Mehajer's parents, Mohamad and Amal, have come to the attention of Australian authorities in relation to unpaid taxes worth almost $10 million. Mohamad has previously been sentenced to 3.5 years prison for bribery and fraud in an attempt to defraud the National Australia Bank.

== Political career ==
Mehajer ran as an independent member of the Legislative Assembly for Auburn at the 2011 New South Wales state election. He was subsequently investigated by the Election Funding Authority of New South Wales for failing to declare electoral spending and political donations but, as he was not elected, no action was taken against him.

He was elected as an independent councillor for the City of Auburn in 2011, and was subsequently elected as deputy mayor. In 2014, the Division of Local Government conducted an investigation into Mehajer's pecuniary interests and suspended him from civic office for a month for failing to disclose his business and property interests.

=== Suspension of job as deputy mayor ===
In September 2015, Mehajer faced accusations of conflict of interest in decisions made by the local council. The New South Wales Civil and Administrative Tribunal ordered Mehajer to be suspended for four months for his failure to disclose financial interests.

Mehajer appeared on Nine News in October 2015 with his wife, and from a lectern gave an interview with a reporter. In the interview, he said "I would like to start off by being in state, federal and I'd like to make my way up to the very top spot. That would [be] my dream come true" and denied claims that he was part of a group of six councillors who were accused of banding together to push through development applications. Reaction to the interview ranged from it being called a "bizarre stage-managed spectacle" by The Huffington Post, to criticism from radio host Ray Hadley in an interview with the Today show's host Karl Stefanovic. A month after the interview, Mehajer claimed to have lost interest in politics altogether and now intended to pursue the study of medicine and to qualify as a medical doctor specializing in mental health.

The suspension of the deputy mayor was overturned on appeal in February 2016, however the entire council had been suspended by this time.

=== Suspension of Auburn City Council, and public enquiry ===
The NSW Government later suspended the entire Auburn City Council in February 2016 and appointed an administrator while a public inquiry examined the allegations of councillors misusing their positions. The appointed administrator scrapped two major developments which could benefit Mehajer.

Auburn City Council was abolished on 12 May 2016 by the NSW Government. Parts of Auburn City Council (south of the M4 Western Motorway) and Parramatta City Council (Woodville Ward), and Holroyd City Council merged to form the Cumberland Council as a new local government area. The remainder of the Auburn City Council area north of the M4 Western Motorway (including Sydney Olympic Park) was merged into the City of Parramatta Council.

A later public enquiry, held in November 2016, found no adverse findings against Mehajer or Sydney's Auburn City Council in regard to his development applications. The minister believed that this was due to the limited powers of the inquiry and referred the matter to the Independent Commission Against Corruption.

=== Failing to declare political donations ===
On 14 November 2017, Mehajer pleaded guilty of failing to declare political donations and was fined $3,300 and ordered to pay costs of $3,487.

=== Conviction of electoral fraud ===
After an ongoing investigation by the Australian Electoral Commission, on 15 June 2017, Mehajer was charged with over 100 electoral fraud offences along with his sister, Fatima, while he was the deputy Mayor of Auburn. Fatima pleaded guilty to 77 counts of giving false or misleading information to the Australian Electoral Commission. In April 2018, he was found guilty of electoral fraud and was sentenced on 22 June 2018 to 21 months in prison with a non-parole period of 11 months. Mehajer began to appeal the length of the non-parole period, but abandoned the appeal in February 2019 when the judge said she would consider an application from the Crown for a higher sentence.

== Marriage and divorce ==
Mehajer came to public prominence in Australia and overseas after his 2015 marriage to his fiancé Aysha (formerly April Amelia Learmonth) was widely publicised in the media. The media focused on Mehajer's manner of arrival, which involved flying in one of four helicopters then proceeding to the wedding in a fleet of luxury sports cars, and for his wedding video which was widely shown on media sites in Australia. During the event, he was accused of closing Frances Street in Lidcombe without authorisation, and for distributing fake notices warning residents that their cars would be towed if they were not cleared from the street, and later fined $220. Aysha later separated from Mehajer in April 2016. Following this, in July 2016, Aysha applied for and received an apprehended violence order (AVO) against Mehajer on the grounds she felt intimidated.

In November 2017, police alleged that Mehajer had breached the AVO taken out by his ex-wife. The breaches related to him driving to the laneway behind her home and posting a picture on Instagram of the couple when they were still together. On 24 April 2018 the judge found that Mehajer did not contravene the AVO on the grounds the prosecution had not proven he knew the conditions of the AVO, however he was found guilty of intimidatory conduct after he allegedly sent over 400 messages to her after the pair had separated. He was placed on an 18-month good behaviour bond. He has reportedly "moved on" and has a new partner. However it was later reported that Mejaher also was fighting with his wife and that he had assaulted her.

== Criminal charges and convictions ==
=== Fraud charges and convictions ===
Salim Mehajer
- Status: On parole
- Motive: Election to local government
- Conviction: Electoral fraud (2018)
- Criminal charges: Electoral fraud; 5 counts breach apprehended violence order; 4 counts common assault; stalk/intimidate; intentionally choke etc person with recklessness
- Penalty: 21 months; non-parole period of 11 months
- Accomplice: Fatima Mehajer (sister)

Details
- Imprisoned at: Silverwater Correctional Complex

=== Apprehended violence orders and conviction for intimidation ===
Mehajer was accused of threatening personal trainer Bruce Herat in October 2015 after a disagreement at a gymnasium. Mehajer was subsequently charged with intimidation by police and had an apprehended violence order (AVO) taken out against him. The AVO prohibited Mehajer from entering Herat's workplace, Anytime Fitness Gym in Burwood. According to Herat, Mehajer used offensive and threatening language towards him. However, the magistrate later dismissed the charges because the security camera had been broken in the council car park, where the alleged confrontation occurred, and he had no way of knowing for certain that Mehajer had threatened Herat, however, the AVO was extended by a further 12 months. A later appeal against the extension was dismissed.

=== Assault convictions ===
On 2 April 2017, Mehajer allegedly assaulted a taxi driver outside the Star Casino in Sydney, by throwing an EFTPOS machine at the taxi driver's face. He also allegedly took the driver's mobile phone and threw it out of the car. Mehajer took a plea deal and pleaded guilty to assault occasioning actual bodily harm, and destroying or damaging property. Mehajer was ordered to pay compensation of just over $600 and enter into a three-year good behaviour bond.

On the same day, Mehajer was also accused of deliberately shutting a car door on a Seven News reporter's hand, and was subsequently charged with assault occasioning actual bodily harm. On 23 February 2018, he was found guilty due to the reckless nature of closing the door without looking, however the judge recorded a conviction without imposing any other penalty due to the "appalling and predatory behaviour" of the media pack who pursued him.

=== Electoral fraud conviction ===
On 15 June 2017, Mehajer was charged with over 100 electoral fraud offences and was found guilty in April 2018. On 22 June 2018, he was sentenced to 21 months in prison with a non-parole period of 11 months. He was released on 21 May 2019.

=== Staged car crash charges ===
On 23 January 2018, Mehajer was arrested and charged with conspiracy to commit fraud and with perverting the course of justice about a car crash that occurred on 16 October 2017. He was refused bail, with the magistrate stating that the case "strikes at the very core of the justice system". Mehajer was released on 4 April 2018 after $200,000 bail was posted, his conditions of bail include reporting to the police twice a day, but he attended court each day as his electoral fraud trial was underway.

=== Drug charges ===
On 28 March 2018, Mehajer was charged with two counts of possessing and one count of supplying a controlled drug, police allegedly found more than 200 anxiety and painkiller pills – 50 alprazolam (Xanax) tablets, and 174 Endone (Oxycodone) and Targin (Oxycodone and Naloxone) tablets – at the property developer's Lidcombe mansion during a raid on 8 November 2017. The Australian reported that he was convicted on 19 August 2020 of one count of possessing 63 Endone pills which had been found in six locations in his house, and his manbag. Despite requesting leniency, the magistrate stated that, as "there has been somewhat of a history of offending over the last years", she could only conclude that the "potent drugs and the sheer numbers of them alert the court to the misuse, and to a degree of criminality that must be attached to that offending." He was sentenced to a 12-month conditional release order.

=== AVO breach while imprisoned ===
In January 2021, Mehajer was charged with breaching an apprehended violence order while imprisoned at Silverwater Correctional Complex in December 2020. Mehajer allegedly breached the AVO by contacting his former partner, Missy Tysoe, in an attempt to have the order removed.

=== 2023 document forgery charges ===
Mehajer faced additional fraud charges in mid-2023 in the NSW District Court, after he was accused of forging the signatures of his then-legal representative, Zali Burrows, and his sister. He denied doing this. Burrows stated in court that it wasn't her signature, as she was in court at the time it was allegedly signed.

== Disqualified from managing corporations, companies placed in administration ==
In August 2016, the Australian Securities and Investments Commission banned Mehajer from managing any corporation for three years "as a means of protecting others from his incompetence". His failed companies owed more than one million dollars to the Australian Taxation Office. The Administrative Appeals Tribunal upheld a previous ban that was appealed by Mehajer, who also sought a suppression of the proceedings to remain out of the public eye.

== Civil suits, and bankruptcy ==
=== Pursued for unpaid bill for staircase ===
Mehajer had a marble staircase installed in his home. The company that installed it states they were not paid for their work. "The Greenacre company sued him and won, with NSW District Court Judge Judith Gibson in October ordering Mehajer to pay up to almost $1 million – the cost of the staircase and about $400,000 to cover Prime Marble's court costs."

=== Pursued by Administrator ===
The liquidator, Anthony Elkerton of Dean-Willcocks Advisory, is pursuing Mehajer and his business partner for $672,297 plus interest and costs. Tim Orlizki of law firm Kent Attorneys appeared in the Supreme Court seeking leave to withdraw from acting for Mr Mehajer in the liquidator's proceedings before a three-day hearing started, as he had not been paid.

=== Bankruptcy ===
On 14 August 2017, he had put his million-dollar house up for lease due to ongoing legal battles.

On 20 March 2018, a federal court judge declared Mehajer bankrupt, and appointed a trustee to manage his property and financial affairs.

=== Vexatious litigant order ===
On 27 May 2022, a Justice of the NSW Supreme Court declared Mehajer a vexatious litigant, preventing him from commencing legal proceedings in NSW

== Driving offences ==
=== Car crash (2012) ===
Mehajer was involved in a serious car crash, on 17 January 2012, when he lost control of his Ferrari 612 Scaglietti at the crest of The Boulevarde in Lidcombe and ran over two women before colliding with a wall. The two women were rushed to Westmead Hospital where they underwent surgery for serious leg and pelvic injuries. They were released from hospital after spending a month in recovery.

Mehajer was convicted of negligent driving on 23 October 2012 at Burwood Local Court where he had his licence disqualified and was sentenced to 150 hours of community service by magistrate Brian Maloney. Mehajer appealed and in September 2013 the conviction was overturned.

The two injured women later sued him in 2014 and Mehajer reached a settlement with them in early October 2015, agreeing to pay AUD$1.72 million which was paid by his insurers, NRMA.

=== Demerit points and stamp duty ===
Mehajer is under investigation for undervaluing his luxury cars to avoid higher stamp duty and demerit point shifting to other parties for driving offences. Mehajer is still under investigation.

=== Car crashes October and November (2017) ===
On 16 October 2017, while on his way to court to face charges, the vehicle in which he was travelling was involved in a crash and he was taken to hospital. Mehajer claimed that he was not the driver.

In the early hours of 20 November 2017, Mehajer was arrested following a car crash in Kingsgrove in Sydney's south. He was charged with one count of dangerous driving.

On 23 January 2018, Mehajer was arrested and charged with conspiracy to commit fraud and with perverting the course of justice with regard to the 16 October crash.

On 24 January 2018, a magistrate refused Mehajer bail stating that the case "strikes at the very core of the justice system". Mehajer was released on 4 April 2018 after $200,000 bail was posted. His conditions include reporting to police twice a day.

== Custodial sentences ==
On 23 January 2018, Mehajer was placed in custody of Silverwater Correctional Complex on remand for 10 weeks. Mehajer was released on 4 April 2018 after $200,000 bail was posted.

On 22 June 2018, Mehajer was sentenced to 21 months prison relating to 77 charges of electoral fraud. The sister of Mehajer, Fatima Mehajer was given a two-month suspended prison sentence for her role in the scam. Mehajer will be eligible for parole after 11 months.

In August 2018, it was reported Mehajer is incarcerated in Cooma Correctional Centre, during this sentence it has been reported that Mehajer allegedly assaulted a prison officer and had been placed on a 14-day segregation order.

On 19 December 2018, during a court appearance in Sydney Federal Court Mehajer stated he would be released from prison by 21 March 2019 at the latest. This would mean Mehajer would only serve nine months of his 21-month sentence, despite reports of assaulting a prison officer and stockpiling medication during his time in Cooma Correctional Centre. Mehajer was released on 21 May 2019, having served an 11-month sentence.

In April 2021, Mehajer was sentenced to 2 years and 3 months for lying to a court in 2017 in order to secure relaxed bail conditions. In his judgement, NSW District Court Judge Peter Zahra found that Mehajer showed “a total disregard for the courts and believes they can be manipulated for his own purposes at any time”.

In May 2023, a jury found Mehajer guilty of intimidation, intentionally suffocating a person with recklessness, assault occasioning actual bodily harm, and three counts of common assault against an ex-girlfriend. He also faced sentencing for making and using false documents to obtain an advantage. He was sentenced to seven years and nine months, with a non-parole period of three-and-a-half years.
