= Trinity Catholic College, Auburn =

Trinity Catholic College Auburn/Regents Park
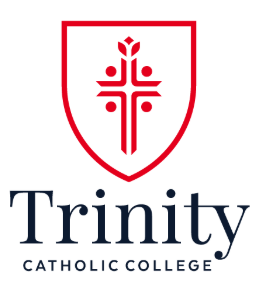

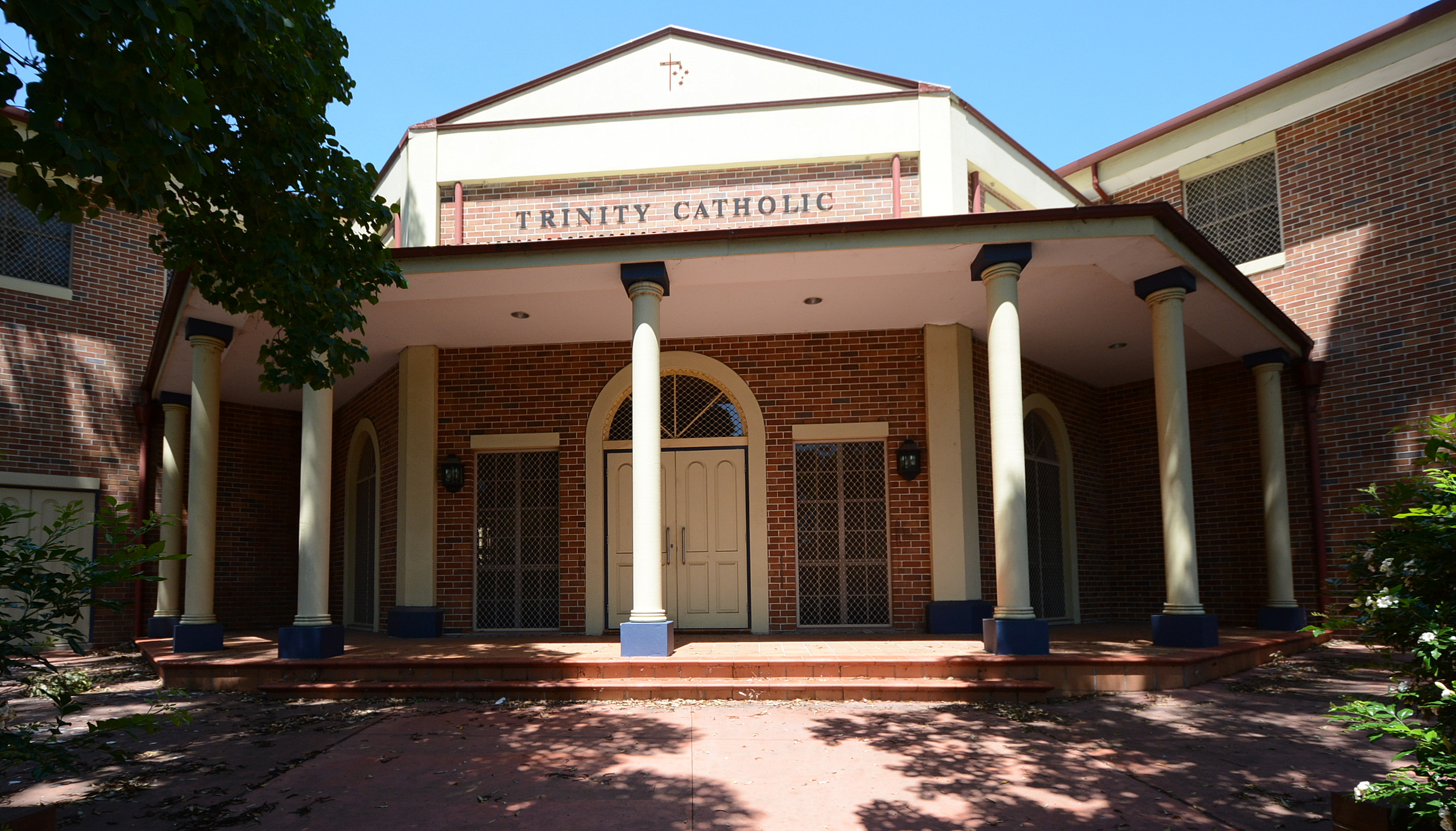
- Entrance to Trinity Catholic College, Auburn, pictured in 2016.

Location
- Auburn and Regents Park, Sydney, New South Wales; Australia; 33°51′01″S 151°01′49″E; 33°52′42″S 151°01′38″E

Information
- Former names: Benedict College, Auburn; St John's Regional College for Girls, Auburn; St Peter Chanel Girls’ High, Regents Park
- Type: Independent co-educational secondary day school
- Motto: Truth, Courage, Community
- Religious affiliation: Association of Marist Schools of Australia
- Denomination: Roman Catholicism
- Established: 1995; 31 years ago
- Educational authority: New South Wales Education Standards Authority
- Oversight: Roman Catholic Archdiocese of Sydney
- Principal: Eseoghene Johnson-Ifoni
- Years: 7–12
- Enrolment: c. 1,230
- Campus: Auburn: Years 9–12; Regents Park: Years 7–8
- Campus type: Suburban
- Colours: Navy, white, red
- Website: trinity.syd.catholic.edu.au

Trinity Catholic College Auburn is a dual-campus independent Roman Catholic co-educational secondary day school, located in the suburbs of Auburn and Regents Park, in Sydney, New South Wales, Australia. Students in Years 7 and 8 are located at the Regents Park campus, and students from Years 9 to 12 are located at the Auburn campus. The college follows the religious tradition of the Marist Brothers, founded in 1817 by French priest and saint Marcellin Champagnat.

== History ==
Trinity Catholic College was founded in 1995 from an amalgamation of three schools: Benedict College, Auburn, St John's Regional College for Girls, Auburn and St Peter Chanel Girls’ High, Regents Park. The Sydney Archdiocesan Catholic Schools Board decided to constitute a single new co-educational College to operate on two campuses in 1992.

The tradition of the Marist Brothers was established in 1942 with the foundation of a boys’ school at Auburn, which eventually became the senior Secondary school of the district, Benedict College. The Sisters of Charity, the first religious sisters to work in Australia, began a school at Auburn in 1893, which became St John's Regional College for Girls. The inspiration of St Mary of the Cross as one of the college's saints was handed down in St Peter Chanel Girls’ High at Regents Park, founded in 1953 by the Sisters of St Joseph.

== Principals ==
The following individuals have served as Principal of Trinity Catholic College:

Ordinal	Officeholder	Start of term	End of term	Time in office	Notes
1	John Thompson	1995	1999	3–4 years	
2	Paul Fensom	2000	2011	10–11 years	
3	John Robinson	2012	2016	3–4 years	
4	Daniel Delmage	2017	2022	8–9 years	
5	Rick Grech	2023	Incumbent		

== HSC results ==
In 2013, 1% of the HSC courses provided were above state average. In 2014, 83% of the HSC courses provided were above state average, and in 2015, 81% of the HSC courses were above state average. These results place Trinity Catholic College among the highest performing schools in the Roman Catholic Archdiocese of Sydney. The school ranked 206th in NSW in 2018, in terms of HSC results. In 2019, the school was ranked 223rd in NSW for their HSC results.

== Sports and extracurricular activities ==
Sports is a part of the curriculum at Trinity Catholic College. All students participate in a sport program each Thursday afternoon as well as having the opportunity to participate in a number of whole-school sporting carnivals.

The college is a member of both the (MCSA) and the Metropolitan Combined Catholic Schools' Association (MCCS), which hold competitions for a variety of sports for both boys and girls. The MCS provides inter-school competition sports such as athletics, basketball, cricket, cross country, golf, rugby league, soccer, softball, squash, swimming, tennis, touch football, and volleyball. The MCCS provides inter-school competition in athletics, volleyball, swimming, softball, soccer, tennis, netball, touch football, basketball, hockey, and chess.

Trinity Catholic College also participates in REMAR, and various other external initiatives, for the purpose of creating a spiritual bond with their Catholic faith. Students have the opportunity to engage in World Youth Day, Youth Camps and reflection days.

== Notable alumni ==
- Jacob Kiraz – currently playing for the Canterbury-Bankstown Bulldogs in the National Rugby League
- Junior Langi – former New Zealand rugby league player for the St George Illawarra Dragons, Melbourne Storm, Parramatta Eels and Salford City Reds
- Salim Mehajer – property developer, convicted criminal and former deputy mayor of Auburn City Council
- Mark Milligan – football player who plays for Melbourne Victory in the A-League
- Daniel Tupou – currently playing for the Sydney Roosters in the National Rugby League

== See also ==
- List of Catholic schools in New South Wales
- Catholic education in Australia
