= Mamdouh Habib =

Former Guantanamo Bay detainee

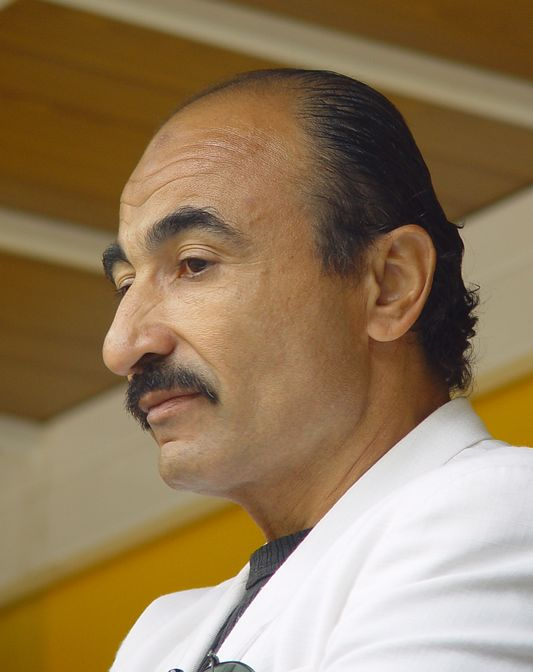
- Habib in 2006
- Born: 3 June 1955 (age 71); Alexandria, Egypt
- Arrested: 5 October 2001
- Released: 11 January 2005
- Detained at: Guantanamo Bay detainment camps
- ISN: 661
- Status: Released
- Spouse: Maha Habib
- Children: Islam Hassam, Ahmed Mandouh Habib, Mustafa Habib, Hajer Habib

Mamdouh Habib (born 3 June 1955) is an Egyptian and Australian citizen with dual nationality, best known for having been held for more than three years by the United States as an enemy combatant, by both the Central Intelligence Agency (CIA) and military authorities. He was sent by extraordinary rendition from Pakistan to Egypt after his arrest. He was held the longest at the Guantanamo Bay detention camp as an enemy combatant. Finally released without charges in January 2005, Habib struggled to have his account of his experiences believed, as he alleged he had been tortured by the CIA, Egyptians, and US military, at times with Australian intelligence officers present. For some time, each of the governments denied his allegations, but they have gradually been confirmed.

Arrested after the 9/11 attacks in 2001 during a trip to Pakistan and Afghanistan, Habib was interrogated there by Pakistani and United States CIA agents before being shipped to Egypt, where he was held for six months and interrogated under torture. The CIA transferred him back to a black site in Afghanistan for more torture and interrogation, then to US military custody. In 2002, Habib was transferred to the Guantanamo Bay detention camp. He continued to be held without charges and suffered coercive interrogation.

The United States accused Habib of having had knowledge of the 11 September 2001 attacks, training the hijackers, staying at an al-Qaeda safe house in Afghanistan, conducting surveillance, helping to transfer chemical weapons, and planning to hijack the aircraft used in the 11 September attacks. He confessed to many acts under torture, but there was no evidence to support these claims.

With legal support, Habib filed for a writ of habeas corpus to challenge his detention. His case of Habib v. Bush was one of two consolidated under Rasul v. Bush (2004). The United States Supreme Court ruled in it that US courts had jurisdiction over Guantanamo and that detainees had the right to challenge their detentions in US courts. Following an article in The Washington Post about Habib's being taken by extraordinary rendition and held secretly in Egypt, the United States decided to release him without charges in January 2005. After Habib returned to Australia in January 2005, officials eventually acknowledged that he "knew nothing about terrorism".

Habib filed suit against the Australian government for cooperating with the United States in his detention and coercive interrogations. In November 2008, Habib published a memoir co-written with Julia Collingwood, My Story: The Tale of a Terrorist Who Wasn't, detailing his experiences. In December 2010, an Egyptian official confirmed Habib's account of his torture in Egypt having been witnessed by an Australian officer, whom he named. The Australian government made an out-of-court settlement in the suit by Habib.

== Life ==
Mamdouh Habib was born on 3 June 1955 in Alexandria, Egypt, where he grew up in a Muslim family. He moved at the age of 24 to Australia in 1980, to join his older brother and sister, who had settled there and urged him to come. He lived and worked in Sydney and became a citizen.

Through his brother's wife, he met her sister, Maha. They married and have had four children, including twin sons.

He worked running a coffee shop and also taught classes and students in Islam. He is a dual citizen of Egypt and Australia. He also worked as a taxi driver.

In the fall of 2001, Habib was arrested in Pakistan. He was held for what was a total of more than three years. After being released in January 2005 without charge by the United States and returned to Australia, Habib encountered difficulties: his passport was revoked and even in 2006, he could not obtain one. The government advised him he would be under surveillance and was still considered a risk.

Habib told his account numerous times to media: he said that he had been interrogated about supposed terrorist activities while under torture in Pakistan, taken to Egypt and interrogated under torture there, transferred to United States military custody in Afghanistan, and transported to Guantanamo Bay detention camp, where he suffered extended solitary confinement, more interrogation and torture. He said that Australian officers had been present at some of these occasions. After the Australian government was notified of his detention in Guantanamo, he was interrogated there by an ASIO agent, who he says threatened him and his family. The torture and Australian witness were denied by the respective governments, and Egypt denied he had been held in the country.

He filed suit against the Australian government for cooperating in his detention and treatment. In December 2010, an Egyptian officer confirmed his story of coercive interrogation in Egypt, with an Australian witness, and said the sessions had been videotaped. Soon after that, the Australian government settled with Habib in a confidential settlement out-of-court, as reported by the Sydney Morning Herald in February 2011.

Later, in 2007, Habib entered politics. He ran as an independent political candidate in the 2007 New South Wales state election. Receiving less than 5% in his electorate in a secure Labor district, he did not gain a seat.

== 1990s ==
When Habib's case was being heard by the US Supreme Court, in 2004 the ABC current affairs program, Four Corners, featured him as the subject of a program. It said that in the 1990s, the Australian Defence Housing Authority took out an "apprehended violence" order against him. DHA claimed that Habib had made a threatening phone call following the cancellation of a contract with the organisation. Habib says this was nothing more than an argument over a contract. In court his psychiatrist had testified that Habib was suffering from major depression at the time and was being treated with Prozac, but that he was not prone to violence. A witness described his irritability and sadness but said he was not aggressive or violent.

According to Four Corners, in early 2001, at a meeting with police, Habib was described by them as showing "signs of hostility towards government organisations and the community generally". Asked to do "a detailed threat assessment," the Protective Services Group concluded there was no evidence to support concerns that Habib might commit an act of violence. The police decided Habib was "a repetitious and vexatious complainant" with "little credibility."

== 2001 to 2005 imprisonment: Pakistan, Egypt, Afghanistan, Cuba ==
Habib claims he became disaffected with Australia, and traveled to Pakistan and Afghanistan in 2001 to find an Islamic school to educate his children. He was arrested in Pakistan in October 2001 while traveling by bus to Karachi, Pakistan. The bus was stopped by local police who arrested Habib and two Germans. The two German citizens were released shortly thereafter. The Four Corners program stated that the two Germans were asked whether they had seen Habib, and whether he had told them that he had been in Afghanistan. They said nothing that incriminated Habib; one replied; "No. I didn't see him in the camps I was in. Nor did he tell us that he had been in a training camp."

After questioning by Pakistani and CIA officers, Habib was transported in custody by extraordinary rendition to Egypt, his country of origin. There he was held for 5 months and questioned before being transferred to US military custody and imprisoned in Afghanistan. A Pentagon spokesman said at the time that Habib was a terrorist who had spent his time across the border in Afghanistan, "either supporting hostile forces, or on the battlefield fighting illegally against the U.S." following its entry in the fall of 2001.

Australian government authorities alleged that while Habib had been in Afghanistan, he took an advanced al-Qaeda training course in a camp near Kabul. It claimed that the course included surveillance and photographing facilities, the establishment and use of safe houses, covert travel and writing secret reports. Australian authorities say that several other men who took part in the course identified Habib as having been there. Evidence to support these claims was not made public.

The CIA sent Habib back to Egypt by extraordinary rendition, where he claims he was held and interrogated under torture for five months. He claims his Egyptian captors allegedly shocked him with high-voltage wires, hung him from metal hooks on walls, and beat him. In 2005 an Egyptian official said that he could not comment on these specific allegations, but added that accusations that the Egyptian government was torturing people "tend to be mythology". The claims have been substantiated by other witnesses and Moazzam Begg, a British citizen and former detainee at Guantanamo who founded Cageprisoners, an organization representing detainees.

"They outsource torture," said Stephen Hopper, Habib's Australian lawyer, referring to the practices of the United States. "You get your friends and allies to do your dirty work for you." Habib has said that some of his interrogators in Pakistan had recognizable American accents, and that one had a tattoo of an American flag on his arm.

In 2002, the US transported Habib from Egypt to Guantanamo Bay, where he was detained for two years. During detention, Habib confessed to a litany of terrorism-related crimes, including teaching martial arts to several of the September 11 hijackers and planning a hijacking. After release, in 2005 Habib insisted that his confessions were false and given under "duress and torture."

== Mamdouh Ibrahim Ahmed Habib v. George Bush ==
A writ of habeas corpus, Mamdouh Ibrahim Ahmed Habib v. George Bush, was submitted on Mamdouh Ibrahim Ahmed Habib's behalf. In response, on 1 October 2004, the Department of Defense released 63 pages of unclassified documents related to his Combatant Status Review Tribunal. On 20 September 2004, his "enemy combatant" status was confirmed by Tribunal panel 6.

== 2005 on: release and post-release ==
On 11 January 2005, the day before his charges were scheduled to be laid by the military commission, Dana Priest at The Washington Post published a front-page article of Habib's account of his experiences, including his extraordinary rendition to Egypt and torture there and at Guantanamo Bay detention camp. Later that day, the United States government announced that it would not be charging Habib, and would release him to Australia. The Australian Attorney-General Phillip Ruddock announced that Habib would be repatriated within days.

The Australian government chartered a special plane (for approximately $500,000) to fly Habib home because the US would not allow him to travel on a regular commercial flight. US officials insisted he be shackled during the flight. Habib returned to Australia on 28 January 2005.

== Return to Australia ==
After his return, in January 2005, Habib filed suit against the Australian government for its cooperation with the United States, alleging that he was beaten and humiliated in Pakistan after his arrest. He also alleged that an Australian official was present at some of these interrogations, but the Australian Government denied this. Habib claims to have been suspended to a ceiling by his arms, standing atop a barrel drum, and that when he gave an answer his Pakistani interrogators didn't believe, they would jolt him with electricity until he fainted.

Habib also alleged that at Guantanamo, he suffered both mental and physical abuse: for instance, interrogators told him that his family had been killed, and he was tied to the ground while a prostitute threw menstrual blood on him.

(Note: It is now known that in August 2002, the Office of Legal Counsel, United States Department of Justice, issued three documents of legal opinion to the CIA, which have come to be called the Torture Memos, narrowly defining torture and authorizing certain enhanced interrogation techniques, and another in March 2003 to DOD. Such techniques, commonly classified as torture, were adopted by the CIA and DOD.)

At the time, the Australian Foreign Minister, Alexander Downer, publicly challenged Habib's claims, saying "no evidence has been found to prove that torture has been used at the camp." Since that time, there have been numerous allegations and documentation of torture by former detainees at Guantanamo. In addition, in the spring of 2004, the Abu Ghraib prisoner torture and abuse scandal in Iraq had captured media attention, showing that excesses had been committed against prisoners under US military supervision. In spring 2004, one of the "Torture Memos" was leaked to the press, which gave insight into the legal opinions being promulgated in the George W. Bush administration.

In February 2005, the Australian Broadcasting Corporation interviewed Christopher Tennant, the director of Sydney University's Psychological medicine unit. Having examined Habib after his return, Tennant said:

- "He [Habib] showed me marks on his back, he showed me cigarette burns on his body, and the subsequent examination by another professor of medicine, more expert in physical examination than me, confirmed that he's got skin discolouration on his right loin which would be consistent with old bruising, which in turn would be consistent with beating..."
- "Well, the main feature of the medical report from Guantanamo was that he had had repeatedly blood in his urine, which is a very significant symptom and a worrying symptom, and that was consistent with his reports both to me and to the specialist physician who also examined him, and was consistent with the fact that, on examination, he had evidence of discolouration to his skin on his right loin, just over his kidney, which in turn was consistent with old bruising and possibly due to being beaten."

Australian officials revoked Habib's passport, saying he remained under suspicion. They warned him that his activities would be constantly monitored to ensure he does not become a security threat. He was not charged and remained relatively free. His records from Guantanamo Bay, released in a WikiLeaks dump in April 2011, indicated that US officials considered him a relatively high risk.

The Australian government said it wanted to prevent Habib from being paid by the media for interviews or "making profits from committing a crime," but he had not been charged or convicted of a crime in any country. (Current anti-terrorism laws in Australia make it illegal to be involved in terrorist organisations, but Habib was already in custody when these laws were introduced and he cannot be convicted under them. There is no evidence that he was involved in such organisations.) John Howard, then Australian Prime Minister, ruled out any apology to Habib.

Habib told his family everything that had happened after he left Sydney in July 2001. Just in case something bad happens to him, he said, "I want them to know fully everything".

Habib has struggled to get back to his normal life. On 22 August 2005 he complained of having been attacked by three men with a knife while walking with his wife near his home in Guildford. He told police that he was followed by a car that cut its headlights as he and his wife, Maha, went for a walk just after midnight, and that as the men ran away, the person holding the knife had yelled "something like 'this should keep you quiet"'.

On 29 March 2006, Habib and his son Moustafa said that they witnessed the aftermath of a double murder in the Sydney suburb of Granville. When they reported the murder to police, Habib alleges they were abused, assaulted and interrogated by police officers. On 3 April, he announced his intention to sue New South Wales Police for false imprisonment and assault.

On 11 June 2007, the Australian Broadcasting Commission's (ABC) investigative journalism program, Four Corners, aired a documentary on extraordinary renditions and the ghost prisoners who were being held by US civilian intelligence agencies abroad. Because of Habib's arrest in Pakistan and rendition to Egypt, the program featured his case.

On 7 March 2008, Habib lost his defamation case against Nationwide News, publisher of The Daily Telegraph. Justice Peter McClellan found Habib was "prone to exaggerate", "evasive" and had made claims about mistreatment in Pakistan and Egypt which could not be sustained. He found that "Habib's claims that he was seriously mistreated in the place of detention in Islamabad cannot be accepted" and "that this evidence was given in order to enhance his forensic position in the present litigation." In November 2008, Habib published his memoir, My Story: The Tale of a Terrorist Who Wasn't, written with Julia Collingwood. In it he recounted events of torture at the places he was detained.

On 1 May 2009, Habib lost an appeal in the Full Federal Court against a 2007 Administrative Appeals Tribunal (AAT) decision that affirmed the former Foreign Affairs minister's decision in 2006 to refuse him an Australian passport. The government had revoked his passport when he was first returned to Australia and refused to issue him one in 2006. The AAT had concluded that Habib and his wife had given false evidence in the proceedings. They said that Habib still held the extremist sentiments that the government had understood he had held before 2001.

In February 2010, Habib was scheduled to appear in his ten-minute play, Waiting For Mamdouh, a monologue about his time in detention, at the Short+Sweet theatrical festival in Sydney.

In December 2010, Habib reached an out-of-court, confidential settlement with the Australian government. He received a secret sum in exchange for absolving the government of liability in his treatment during his detention by the United States. At the time, Habib has said that he plans to use the money to begin an international lawsuit against the Egyptian and United States governments over his treatment. He said that he had fresh evidence, including film footage.

On 13 February 2011, the Sydney Morning Herald published an article confirming Habib's accounts of torture in Egypt with at least one Australian officer as a witness, as an Egyptian officer had affirmed his account and named the officer. The Australian government initiated an investigation. The newspaper said the officer's account was the reason that the government had settled with Habib in December 2010. The officer said there were videotapes of the interrogations of Habib.

In April 2011, Habib's case file was among many documents from the Guantanamo Bay detention camp in the WikiLeaks. His records from Guantanamo Bay included American comments that he was "deceptive." In May 2011, Habib was granted an Australian passport. The Australian Security Intelligence Organisation (ASIO) said that it no longer considered him a security risk.

== Entrance into Australian politics ==
In the March 2007 New South Wales state election, Habib stood as an independent candidate in the safe Labor seat of Auburn in Sydney. He received less than 5% of the vote and the seat was comfortably retained by the Australian Labor Party.

He campaigned for the removal of the Federal Government's anti-terror laws, stating "The terror laws are if you have terrorists, but we don't have terrorists".

== See also ==
- List of Australians in international prisons
- David Hicks
- Guantánamo: My Story
- Torture
