= Thomas Ryan (New South Wales politician) =

Australian politician (1895–1972)

Thomas Vernon Ryan (26 July 1895 – 14 October 1972) was an Australian politician. He was a Labor Party member of the New South Wales Legislative Assembly from 1956 to 1965, representing the electorate of Auburn.

Ryan was born in Mossgiel, and was educated at Wilcannia. He worked variously in farming and mining before entering the Railways Department as a storeman. While stationed at Dubbo in the 1930s, he became actively involved in both trade unionism and the Labor Party, serving as both the secretary of the local branch of the party and in various roles for the Australian Railways Union. He also served a brief stint on the City of Dubbo council from 1936. He relocated to Sydney in 1938, and was elected to the Auburn Council in 1939. He served five years on the Auburn council, including one year as mayor in 1942.

Ryan, a supporter of Jack Lang, resigned from the Labor Party in 1943 along with the final Lang Labor split, subsequently becoming president of the reformed splinter party. He was a prominent figure in the Lang movement for the next three years, and contested the 1946 federal election as the Lang Labor candidate for West Sydney. However, he resigned from Lang Labor in 1946 in protest at the preselection of Lang's son, Chris Lang, to contest Lang's state seat following his entry into federal politics. He rejoined the Labor Party thereafter, and attempted to win Labor preselection to challenge Chris Lang at the 1950 election, losing to MLA Edgar Dring, whose seat had been abolished in a redistribution.

Dring died in December 1955, and Ryan won Labor preselection to contest the still-vacant Auburn seat at the 1956 state election. He was easily re-elected in 1959 and 1962, but was defeated for preselection in 1965 by Peter Cox. He did not hold party parliamentary or ministerial office.

Ryan retired to Davidstown NSW before returning to Sydney Guildford where he died in 1972.

Civic offices
| Preceded by Norman Keile | Mayor of Auburn; 1941–1942 | Succeeded by Bernard John Kelly |
New South Wales Legislative Assembly
| Preceded by Edgar Dring | Member for Auburn; 1956–1965 | Succeeded by Peter Cox |
