= 2001 Auburn state by-election =

Election result for Auburn, New South Wales, Australia

A by-election was held for the New South Wales Legislative Assembly electorate of Auburn on 8 September 8 2001 because of the resignation of Peter Nagle (Labor).

== Results ==
2001 Auburn by-election Saturday 8 September
Party	Candidate	Votes	%	±%
Labor	Barbara Perry	17,690	46.57	−12.92
Liberal	Judy Irvine	8,499	22.38	−3.35
Unity	Le Lam	3,792	9.98	+2.56
Independent	Mohamed Saddick	2,581	6.79	
Unaffiliated	Bob Vinnicombe	1,741	4.58	
Democrats	Colin McDermott	903	2.38	−0.44
Greens	Steve Maxwell	845	2.22	+0.38
Independent	Kim Appleby	744	1.96	
Unaffiliated	Bala Balendra	616	1.62	
Christian Democrats	David Barker	501	1.32	
Independent	Caleb Barker	72	0.19	
Total formal votes		37,984	96.93	+0.67
Informal votes		1,204	3.07	−0.67
Turnout		39,188	85.51	−8.11
Two-party-preferred result
Labor	Barbara Perry	19,600	63.14	−11.13
Liberal	Judy Irvine	11,443	36.86	+11.13
Labor hold		Swing	−11.13	

== See also ==
- Electoral results for the district of Auburn
- List of New South Wales state by-elections
