= Guardianship Tribunal of New South Wales =

Legal tribunal overview
- Formed: 1 August 1989
- Dissolved: 31 December 2013
- Superseding Legal tribunal: New South Wales Civil and Administrative Tribunal
- Jurisdiction: New South Wales
- Headquarters: Level 3, 2a Rowntree Street, Balmain
- Parent Legal tribunal: Supreme Court of New South Wales
- Key document: Guardianship Act, 1987 (NSW)
- Website: ncat.nsw.gov.au

The Guardianship Tribunal of New South Wales, a former specialist disability tribunal of the Government of New South Wales for people with cognitive incapacity, or disability operated between 1989 and 2013. The Tribunal was superseded by the New South Wales Civil and Administrative Tribunal (NCAT) which came into effect from 1 January 2014. Its functions now operate within a divisional context in the NCAT.

The former tribunal was able to appoint guardians and financial managers as substitute decision makers, give to consents to medical treatment for people over 16 years of age and was able to review private arrangements about enduring guardianship and enduring powers of attorney.

The former tribunal was established pursuant to Guardianship Act, 1987 (NSW) and commenced operations on 1 August 1989.

Led by its former President, Malcolm Schyvens, who served for a fixed five-year term, the former tribunal was an independent body. However any decisions made by the tribunal were subject to legal appeal, with the Supreme Court of New South Wales being the ultimate body to make rulings on matters of law before the former tribunal.

Where the former tribunal made an order to appoint the NSW Public Guardian as guardian of last resort, the Public Guardian would then act as a substitute decision-maker for people under his guardianship. The NSW Public Guardian is an independent statutory official, presently Graeme Smith. The Public Guardian is part of the Department of Justice and is supported administratively by the NSW Trustee and Guardian.

== Constitution of the former tribunal ==
The former tribunal was established under the Guardianship Act 1987 (NSW) (which was formerly called the Disability Services and Guardianship Act 1987 (NSW)). The former tribunal comprised a president, a deputy president and at least ten tribunal members appointed by the Governor of New South Wales. Prior to its dissolution on 31 December 2013, there were more than ten members appointed.

The former tribunal normally sat as a three-member panel. One member was a member with legal expertise, normally a lawyer with more than seven years legal experience. The other two panel members were a professional member, who had experience in the assessment or treatment of adults with disabilities. The other member was a community member, who had experience with people with disabilities.

== Jurisdiction ==
If a person was found to be unable to manage their own "lifestyle decisions", the former tribunal may appoint a guardian and would decide who that was. The former tribunal could appoint a financial manager if the person was incapable of managing their own affairs. The former tribunal could decide who that should have been. The former tribunal could also make orders in respect of powers of attorney and may previously have made orders to vary the power of attorney or to replace an attorney.

A person unhappy with the decision of the former tribunal may, in certain circumstances, lodge an appeal to either the former Administrative Decisions Tribunal of New South Wales or the Supreme Court of New South Wales. The former Administrative Decisions Tribunal, now replaced by the New South Wales Civil and Administrative Tribunal (in particular: The Administrative and Equal Opportunity Division) could have requested the former Guardianship Tribunal to supply documents subject to the Guardianship Tribunal's discretion and Section 101 of the Guardianship Act, and the Supreme Court could have instructed the former tribunal to supply records relevant to any matter before the Court.

Tribunals and courts are exempt from the NSW Ombudsman Act. Although citizens are expected to comply with laws of the State, the Guardianship Act did not specifically instruct the former Guardianship Tribunal to do so and interpretation of Sections of the Guardianship Act by the former Tribunal were not subject to review. Evidence and matters previously considered by the former tribunal were excluded from internal consideration from any request for an internal review.

== The hearing ==
Prior to its dissolution, all parties to a matter could have attended a hearing. When this was not possible, evidence would be taken by telephone and witnessed were called and gave evidence.

Legal representation was only permitted with the former tribunal's leave. The former tribunal was not subject to judicial protocols or rules of evidence, and legal representation was usually not beneficial. The former tribunal assigned a case manager as "investigator" who received any reports sent to the tribunal; the managers did not initiate investigation of any matters but during the week before the hearing they prepared a report for the tribunal members who sat to consider the case.

Reports by doctors and social workers were considered by the former tribunal to be more reliable than community testimony.

The former tribunal sat in Sydney, but also sat elsewhere in the State, including a range of locations in regional New South Wales.

== Caseload ==
In the former tribunal's Annual Report for 2004–2005, the former tribunal reported that it had received 4,968 application in that year and about 2,000 matters under continuing management by the former tribunal.
