= 1946 Auburn state by-election =

- 9 November 1946

Electoral district of Auburn in the New South Wales Legislative Assembly
- Registered: 24,472
- Turnout: 87.61% (▼5.52)
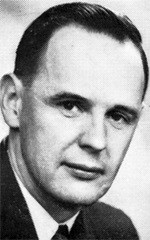

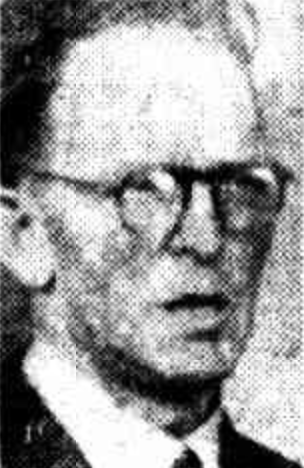

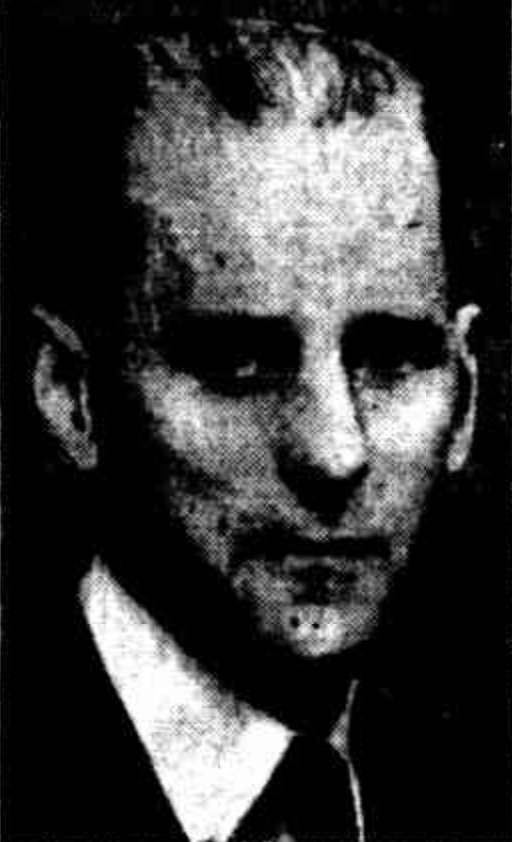
	First party	Second party	Third party
Candidate	Chris Lang	Frank Peffer	Edward Felsch
Party	Lang Labor	Labor	Ind. Liberal
Primary vote	11,064	7,965	2,117
Percentage	52.32%	37.67%	10.01%
Swing	▼13.45	▲3.44	▲10.01
MP before election
Jack Lang
Lang Labor
Elected MP
Chris Lang
Lang Labor

The 1946 Auburn state by-election was held on 9 November 1946 to elect the member for Auburn in the New South Wales Legislative Assembly, following the resignation of Jack Lang, who won the seat of Reid at the 1946 federal election. It was held on the same day as by-elections in Albury, Ashfield, and Corowa.

Lang's son, Chris Lang, won the by-election with 52.32% of the vote.

== Results ==
1946 Auburn state by-election
Party	Candidate	Votes	%	±%
Lang Labor	Chris Lang	11,064	52.32	−13.45
Labor	Frank Peffer	7,965	37.67	+3.44
Independent Liberal	Edward Felsch	2,117	10.01	+10.01
Total formal votes		21,146	98.62	+2.52
Informal votes		295	1.38	−2.52
Turnout		21,441	87.61	−5.52
Lang Labor hold		Swing	−13.45	

== See also ==
- Electoral results for the district of Auburn
- List of New South Wales state by-elections
