= Community Services Appeals Tribunal =

Group in New South Wales

The Community Services Appeal Tribunal was an independent tribunal established in the State of New South Wales to deal with breaches of community welfare legislation, as well as handling appeals against licensing decisions in respect of child care services, boarding houses, and foster carers. The tribunal provided the first forum in New South Wales for alternative dispute resolution in New South Wales for resolving disputes. The tribunal replaced the Community Welfare Appeals Tribunal which was known as CWAT.

The tribunal would hear matters in an informal manner in an attempt to do justice in the matter.

The tribunal was abolished on 1 January 1999 and was replaced by the Community Services Division of the Administrative Decisions Tribunal of New South Wales.

== Establishment ==
The tribunal was established under section 92 of the Community Services (Complaints, Appeals and Monitoring) Act 1993 (NSW). The Governor of New South Wales could appoint a person to be the President of the tribunal. This appointment is on the recommendation of the Minister after consultation with the Community Services Review Council The appointment could be for up to five years, and the President could be re-appointed and the position was a paid appointment.

The Minister could also appoint part-time members to the tribunal after consultation with the Council. One of those part-time members could be appointed as the Deputy President of the tribunal by the Minister. At least one of the members was to be a barrister or a solicitor. A part-time member could be appointed for up to five years and could be re-appointed again. Part-time members were paid a daily remuneration.

In appointing the members, the following persons could be considered:

(a) people with knowledge of and experience in administration, child care, community services, education, law, medicine, psychology and social work; (b) other people who the Minister considered had suitable qualifications or experience warranting their appointment. The appointment can be for up to seven years and the person can be re-appointed again for up to another seven years.

In practice, the tribunal would advertise for expressions of interests in member positions, and would select applicants based on merit. The tribunal took the view that this ensured that members were drawn from a wide pool of qualified applicants.

The President could only be removed from office for misbehaviour or incompetence, or if they obtained other full-time employment. Part-time members could be removed for any reason.

== Jurisdiction ==
The tribunal performed merit reviews of government administrative decisions. In other words, the tribunal would review a decision based on how a government official should have made the decision. This is in contrast to a judicial review where a judge or a court would decide whether the decision was made lawfully. There was also no fees for filing an application in the tribunal. As a result, the tribunal had an important function in making government more “open and accountable” by providing an opportunity for affected people to challenge decisions.

The tribunal had jurisdiction to hear appeals concerning Community Welfare matters., the Adoption Information Act 1990., the Adoption of Children Act 1965, and the Children (Care and Protection) Act 1987, Disability Services and Guardianship Act 1987 and Home Care Service, Act 1988.

Applications could be made by persons with a “genuine concern”. The tribunal took the view that any person directly affected by a decision, or a third party who wished to bring proceedings in the public interest, could bring a case in the tribunal. The concern had to be a concern greater than an ordinary member of the public. The tribunal would also exclude people if it considered that they were “unjustifiably interfering” with a decision.

The jurisdiction of the Tribunal is protective and its purpose is to protect the public. The object is not punitive and the Tribunal is not there to punish the physiotherapist but is there to maintain proper standards in the profession.

== At the hearing ==
The tribunal was required to have between three and five members present when hearing a case. At least one of the members had to be a barrister or a solicitor. As far as possible, at least one of the members had to have some expertise in the area of the case before the tribunal. The presiding member on the case was the President, or if the President was not present, the Deputy President, or a member nominated by the President.

The tribunal could make rules about the procedure to be followed in the tribunal. Additionally, the tribunal could determine any additional points of tribunal as necessary. When the tribunal was first established, the intention was to make it accessible to the general public who might be intimidated by the normal legal processes of a court. The tribunal as a result strived to be informal in its procedures. However, there was still some legalistic aspects of its procedures, and parties would engage lawyers and expert witnesses to appear in the tribunal.

Decisions of the tribunal were to be determined by a majority of the votes of the members. However, any point of law was to be determined by the member who was either a barrister or a solicitor. Where the votes were tied, the presiding member had the casting vote.

Selected decisions are available on the internet at Austlii.

== Sources ==
- Report 90. New South Wales Law Reform Commission. http://www.lawlink.nsw.gov.au/lrc.nsf/pages/r90chp5
- Parliamentary Debate. New South Wales Legislative Council. https://web.archive.org/web/20080908070841/http://parliament.nsw.gov.au/prod/parlment/hansart.nsf/V3Key/LC19970616017
- Parliamentary Debate. New South Wales Legislative Council. https://web.archive.org/web/20110524170603/http://www.parliament.nsw.gov.au/prod/PARLMENT/hansArt.nsf/V3Key/LC19930331034
- ”Contracting out in Community Services. Setting the pace of being left behind”. Anita Tang. April 1996. New South Wales Ombudsman Office. https://web.archive.org/web/20080723071235/http://www.ombo.nsw.gov.au/publication/PDF/other%20reports/Contracting%20Outin%20comm%20services.pdf.pdf
