= Physiotherapists Tribunal =

Former tribunal in New South Wales, Australia

The Physiotherapists Tribunal is a former tribunal established in the Australian state of New South Wales which dealt with appeals and complaints of professional misconduct by physiotherapists.

On 1 January 2014 the tribunal's functions were assumed by the newly established New South Wales Civil and Administrative Tribunal.

The tribunal generally heard matters after the Physiotherapists Board of New South Wales had made a decision, such as hearing an appeal against the cancellation of a physiotherapist's registration. The tribunal heard matters in an informal manner in an attempt to do justice in the matter. The tribunal also conducted inquiries into complaints referred by the New South Wales Health Care Complaints Commission.

In common with other health professionals in New South Wales, physiotherapists are required to be registered. Boards, such as the Physiotherapists Board, are established to register those health professionals, as well as provide other support services to the public. Tribunals are established to deal with allegations of misconduct and to determine whether a health professional should be suspended or de-registered. In New South Wales, the tribunal is unique, as it is a separate tribunal specially set up for this health speciality. This is in contrast to other Australian States, such as Victoria, which have one super tribunal that deals with all health professionals.

== Establishment ==
The tribunal is established under section 100 of the Physiotherapists Act 2001 (NSW). The Governor of New South Wales may appoint an Australian lawyer to be the chairperson of the tribunal. The governor may also appoint any number of Australian lawyers to be deputy chairpersons of the tribunal. The appointment can be for up to seven years and the person can be re-appointed again for up to another seven years.

The tribunal has jurisdiction to hear:

- a complaint about a physiotherapist referred by the Board;
- an appeal against a decision of the Board; or
- the prosecution of a complaint by the Board.

When either of these situations arises, the Physiotherapists Registration Board will inform the chairperson of the tribunal of the matter. The Board will also appoint three persons to sit on the tribunal. Two of the persons selected must be registered physiotherapists. Generally the board will select persons who are peers of the relevant person. The other person on the tribunal must be a lay person (i.e. a person who is not a physiotherapist). This latter person is selected from a panel established by the Minister for Health. The chairperson may personally hear the matter or may instead delegate the hearing to a deputy chairperson. The four persons together constitute the tribunal.

The jurisdiction of the Tribunal is protective and its purpose is to protect the public. The object is not punitive and the Tribunal is not there to punish the physiotherapist but is there to maintain proper standards in the profession.

== At the hearing ==
The members of the tribunal are required to conduct an inquiry to any complaint, matter, application or appeal referred to the tribunal. The chairperson or deputy chairperson must decide when the inquiry is to be heard and must give at least fourteen days' notice to the physiotherapist the subject of the inquiry. The chairperson must also give notice to any person who made the complaint, the Department of Health, the Health Care Complaints Commission, and the Physiotherapists Board. Both the person who made the complaint, and the physiotherapist concerned, are entitled to be legally represented if they so wish. Any inquiry is open to the public, so members of the public or the press are able to observe the proceedings. The tribunal may conduct the inquiry in private if necessary. The tribunal has a range of powers to suppress the publication of information given at the inquiry. For example, the tribunal may prohibit the publication of the names of the witnesses, the complainant or the physiotherapist concerned. Where a person or organisation breaches this requirement, the person or organisation may be prosecuted for a criminal offence. The chairperson or deputy chairman decides all questions of law or matters of legal principle. Their decision is final on the point. In matters of fact or evidence, three of the four members must agree. If the decision is split two-two, then the chairperson or deputy chairperson has the casting vote. Generally the rules of evidence (which the limit the type of evidence which a court can recognise) do not need to be observed in the tribunal. However, because of the serious nature of the proceedings, they are generally heard with a high degree of formality. Witnesses are called, and their testimony is given on oath in the same way that evidence is given in a court of law. The tribunal is empowered to issue summons to compel people to attend the tribunal to give evidence. The tribunal may also direct a written notice for a person or organisation to produce documentation.

== Outcomes ==
If the tribunal after an inquiry determines the matters proved against the physiotherapist, the tribunal has a number of options available to it. The tribunal may caution or only reprimand the person concerned. It may direct the person to seek medical or psychiatric treatment or counselling. It may order that the person complete an educational course. The tribunal may impose conditions on the continuing practice of the physiotherapist. In extreme cases, the tribunal may order the suspension or removal of the physiotherapist from practising. The tribunal is required to given written reasons of its decision within 30 days of the finalisation of the case. There is a right of appeal in certain circumstances to the Supreme Court of New South Wales against the decision of the tribunal. The tribunal heard one appeal in 2006.

== Typical cases in the tribunal ==
The decisions of the tribunal are available on the internet beginning with decisions made in 2007. One of the tribunal's first decisions concerning a complaint against a physiotherapist who found to be guilty of “unsatisfactory professional conduct”. The physiotherapist concerned had been convicted of making false claims for services under Workers Compensation laws in the Local Court of New South Wales. The physiotherapist was reprimanded and suspended for six months and ordered to have ongoing counselling.

== Sources ==
- Physiotherapists Act 2001 (NSW)
- Second Reading Speech in New South Wales Legislative Assembly
- Second Reading Speech in New South Wales Legislative Council
- Annual Report 2005, Department of Health.
- Annual Report 2005, Department of Health.
