= 1943 Auburn state by-election =

1946 Auburn state by-election
- 2 October 1943

Electoral district of Auburn in the New South Wales Legislative Assembly
- Registered: 22,540
- Turnout: 83.98% (▼9.58)
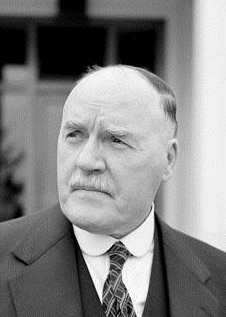

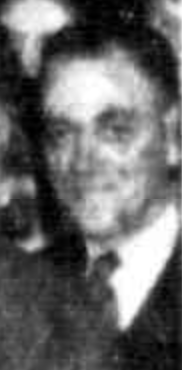

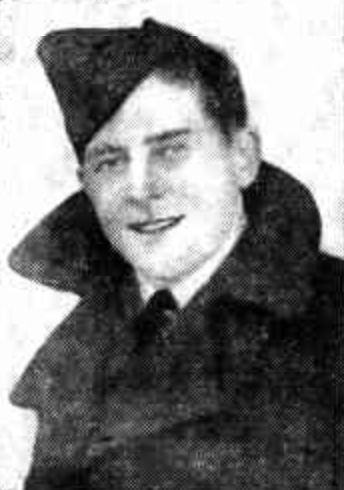
	First party	Second party	Third party
Candidate	Jack Lang	Gordon Byrne	Edward Spensley
Party	Lang Labor	Labor	Independent
Primary vote	10,779	5,346	2,495
Percentage	57.89%	28.71%	13.40%
Swing	▼11.77 (Note: Compared to Labor at the 1941 state election.)	▼40.95	▲13.40
MP before election
Jack Lang
Lang Labor
Elected MP
Jack Lang
Lang Labor

The 1943 Auburn state by-election was held on 2 October 1943 to elect the member for Auburn in the New South Wales Legislative Assembly, following the resignation of Jack Lang, who contested the seat of Reid at the 1946 federal election.

Having been unsuccessful in his federal election campaign, Lang recontested Auburn at the by-election and was re-elected with 57.89% of the primary vote.

== Results ==
1943 Auburn state by-election
Party	Candidate	Votes	%	±%
Lang Labor	Jack Lang	10,779	57.89	−11.77
Labor	Gordon Byrne	5,346	28.71	−40.95
Independent	Edward Spensley	2,495	13.40	+13.40
Total formal votes		18,620	98.37	+4.30
Informal votes		308	1.63	−4.30
Turnout		18,928	83.98	−9.58
Member changed to Lang Labor from Labor				

== See also ==
- Electoral results for the district of Auburn
- List of New South Wales state by-elections
