= Peter Nagle =

Australian politician

Member of the New South Wales Legislative Assembly for Auburn
- In office 1988–2001
- Preceded by: Peter Cox
- Succeeded by: Barbara Perry

Peter Richard Nagle (23 March 1946 – 21 June 2025) is an Australian politician. He was a Labor Party member of the New South Wales Legislative Assembly from 1988 to 2001, representing the electorate of Auburn.

Nagle was born in Sydney, and studied at Benedict Boys High School, Macquarie University and the University of Sydney. He worked variously as a lawyer, union official and TAFE teacher before entering politics. He also served a stint in the Army Reserve from 1962 to 1967, and was elected to the Auburn Council from 1970 to 1976.

Nagle won election to the safe Labor seat of Auburn at the 1988 election on the retirement of Wran government minister Peter Cox. He was re-elected in 1991, 1995 and 1999, before retiring mid-term in 2001, resulting in a by-election that was won by Labor candidate Barbara Perry.

New South Wales Legislative Assembly
| Preceded by Peter Cox | Member for Auburn; 1988 – 2001 | Succeeded by Barbara Perry |
