= Nurses and Midwives Tribunal =

Former Australian judicial entity

The Nurses and Midwives Tribunal is a former tribunal that was established in the Australian state of New South Wales which dealt with appeals and complaints of professional misconduct by nurses and midwives. The tribunal generally heard matters after the Nurses and Midwives Board has made a decision or a professional association had referred an issue to the tribunal. The tribunal heard matters in an informal manner in an attempt to do justice in the matter. The tribunal also conducted inquiries into complaints referred by the New South Wales Health Care Complaints Commission.

On 1 January 2014 the tribunal's functions were assumed by the New South Wales Civil and Administrative Tribunal.

== History ==
The tribunal replaced the earlier Nurses Tribunal previously established under the Nurses Act 1991 (NSW). The old tribunal was superseded following the reforms made to the registration of regulation of nurses in 2003 by the New South Wales government. This arose out of a report prepared by the Department of Health in which that department undertook a review of the Nurses Act then in operation. One of the major thrusts of the report was that the occupation of "midwife" needed to be recognised as a distinct occupation from that of "nurse". Prior to 2003, a person wishing to practice as a midwife needed to be registered as a nurse and obtained a separate authorisation to act as a midwife. The changes since 2003 now allow a person to practice solely as either as a nurse or as a midwife, or as both, provided that they meet the requirements of registration.

== Establishment ==
The present tribunal is established under section 59 of the Nurses and Midwives Act 1991 (NSW). The Governor of New South Wales may appoint a person to be the chairperson of the tribunal. The governor may also appoint any number of persons to be deputy chairpersons of the tribunal. A person may only be appointed a chairperson or deputy chairman if they are a judge of the District Court of New South Wales or an Australian lawyer. The appointment is for up to seven years, but the person can be re-appointed again for up to another seven years. When a matter arises for determination, the Nurses and Midwives Board of New South Wales informs the chairperson of the tribunal of the matter. The chairperson may personally hear the matter or may instead delegate the hearing to a deputy chairperson. The Board then appoints three persons to sit on the tribunal with the chairperson. Two of the persons must either be a nurse or a midwife. Generally the board will select persons who are peers of the relevant person. The other person on the tribunal must be a lay person (i.e. a person who is not a nurse or midwife). This latter person is selected from a panel established by the Minister for Health. The four persons together constitute the tribunal.

== Current members ==
The inaugural chairperson was Irving Wallach (1992–2005). The immediate past chairperson was Nick O'Neill. The deputy chairpersons were Tom Kelly and Joanne Muller.

== At the hearing ==
The members of the tribunal are required to conduct an inquiry to any complaint, matter, application or appeal referred to the tribunal. The chairperson or deputy chairperson must decide when the inquiry is to be heard and must give at least seven days notice to the nurse or midwife the subject of the inquiry. The chairperson must also give notice to any person who made the complaint, and the heads of the Department of Health, the Health Care Complaints Commission, and the Nurses and Midwives Board. Both the person who made the complaint, and the nurse or midwife concerned, are entitled to be legally represented if they wish so. Any inquiry is open to the public, so members of the public or the press are able to observe the proceedings. The tribunal may conduct the inquiry in private if necessary. The tribunal has a range of powers to suppress the publication of information given at the inquiry. For example, the tribunal may prohibit the publication of the names of the witnesses, the complainant or the nurse or midwife concerned. Where a person or organisation breaches this requirement, the person or organisation may be prosecuted for a criminal offence. The chairperson or deputy chairman decides all questions of law or matters of legal principle. Their decision is final on the point. In matters of fact or evidence, three of the four members must agree. If the decision is split two-two, then the chairperson or deputy chairperson has the casting vote. Generally the rules of evidence (which the limit the type of evidence which a court can recognise) do not need to be observed in the tribunal. Witnesses are called, and their testimony is given on oath in the same way that evidence is given in a court of law. The tribunal is empowered to issue summons to compel people to attend the tribunal to give evidence. The tribunal may also direct a written notice for a person or organisation to produce documentation.

== Outcomes ==
If the tribunal after an inquiry determines the matters proved against the nurse or midwife, the tribunal has a number of options available to it. The tribunal may caution or only reprimand the person concerned. It may direct the person to seek medical or psychiatric treatment or counselling. It may order that the person complete an educational course. The tribunal may impose conditions on the continuing practice of the nurse or midwife. In extreme cases, the tribunal may order the suspension or removal of the nurse or midwife from practising. The tribunal is required to given written reasons of its decision within 30 days of the finalisation of the case. There is a right of appeal in certain circumstances to the Supreme Court of New South Wales against the decision of the tribunal.

== Typical cases in the tribunal ==
The decisions of the tribunal are available on the internet beginning with decisions made in 2007. From time to time, decisions of the tribunal attract media attention. In 2006, the tribunal deregistered a nurse employed to look after dementia patients at a retirement village. The tribunal found that the nurse had engaged in professional misconduct as her nursing care was unskilled. The tribunal found that the nurse had fallen asleep whilst caring for her patients, mocked or demeaned patients, and had used excessive force in dealing with patients. In another case the tribunal ordered the suspension of a nurse for professional misconduct. The nurse was an addict of pethidine and was found to be administering pethidine to herself whilst on duty. On a one occasion, her use of the drug caused her after helping a patient shower, swung the patient's underpant above her head whilst laughing. The nurse concerned was also found to have administered pethidine to patients without prescription and also to have destroyed out-of-date pethidine without supervision.

== Sources ==
- “Review of the Nurses Act 1991 Report “ NSW Department of Health http://www.health.nsw.gov.au/legal/pdf/nursesreport.pdf
- Annual Report of Nurses and Midwives Board 2006. http://www.nmb.nsw.gov.au/ArticleDocuments/report2006.pdf.aspx
- Nurses and Midwives Act 1991 (NSW)
- Second Reading Speech in New South Wales Legislative Assembly 30 May 2003. http://www.parliament.nsw.gov.au/prod/parlment/nswbills.nsf/0/a2250d88feebdb05ca256d33001d68a0/$FILE/A4503.pdf
