= Administrative Decisions Tribunal of New South Wales =

The Administrative Decisions Tribunal of New South Wales (ADT) was established in 1997 and was replaced in 2014 by the NSW Civil and Administrative Tribunal (NCAT). It did not have general jurisdiction, but had various jurisdictions conferred by particular statutes. It was responsible for reviewing decisions of some New South Wales government departments, for hearing discrimination complaints referred by the President of the New South Wales Anti-Discrimination Board, for hearing complaints about professional misconduct and for hearing disputes over commercial leases.

It consisted of an Appeal Panel, a General Division and five specialist Divisions: Community Services Division (previously the Community Services Appeals Tribunal), Revenue Division, Equal Opportunity Division, Retail Leases Division and Legal Services Division. The Internal Appeal Panel heard appeals from the Divisions and an External Appeal Panel heard appeals from other bodies. The Tribunal was conducted in a less formal manner than a court and was presided over by either a single member or a panel of three members (depending on the Division). Access was cheaper than to a court and in some cases free of charge.

As with other tribunals in New South Wales, the ADT encouraged parties to negotiate their own resolution through mediation prior to any hearing. The resolution devised by the parties could then be made official at the hearing by a member of the Tribunal. If this failed, the Tribunal could make a decision which would be legally binding upon the parties.
