= Peter Cox (politician) =

Australian politician (1925-2008)

Peter Francis Cox AO (4 December 1925 – 6 October 2008) was a politician in New South Wales, Australia.

== Early life ==
Cox was born in Bathurst, New South Wales, and educated at Marist Brothers College in the Sydney suburb of Lidcombe. His father, Edwin, was a plumber with the NSW railways. Ben Chifley, the future prime minister, helped the Cox family. After leaving school, Peter became a public servant, working for the Department of Motor Transport in 1942. From 1943 until 1945 he was a member of the Second Australian Imperial Force and served in the Borneo campaign.

== Political career ==
In 1949 Cox joined the Labor Party. He won preselection for the New South Wales state seat of Auburn at 39 and entered the Legislative Assembly at the 1965 election, when Labor, then led by Jack Renshaw, lost power. He retained the seat until his retirement in 1988.

Cox became the opposition transport spokesman in 1968 and was noted for his catchphrases such as the "rustbucket railway" and "Calga deathway", referring to the Calga expressway. He unsuccessfully stood for the Deputy Leadership of Labor. Once Labor was returned to office in May 1976, the new Premier Neville Wran appointed Cox Minister for Transport and Minister for Highways, with Cox ranking fourth in terms of cabinet seniority. He retained the transport portfolio, topping the caucus vote for ministerial positions saw him rise to third in seniority in 1980. In a cabinet reshuffle in 1984, Cox heard from the media that he had been demoted to 13th in the cabinet, as Minister for Mineral Resources and Energy. He went on to serve as Minister for Industry and Small Business and Minister for Public Works. He did not contest the 1988 election.

== Personal life and death ==
Cox married Olive May Murphy on 16 September 1961 and they would have five children. After his retirement he worked with the Maryfield Recovery Centre in Campbelltown and was a Director of St Joseph's Hospital, Auburn.

Cox died in Mona Vale on October 6, 2008 (aged 82), survived by Olive and their five children.

== Honours ==
He was made an Officer of the Order of Australia (AO) in 1988 "in recognition of service to the NSW parliament". He was also made a Knight of St. Gregory.

== Notes ==
New South Wales Legislative Assembly
Preceded by Thomas Ryan	Member for Auburn; 1965–1988	Succeeded by Peter Nagle
Political offices
Preceded by Tim Bruxner	Minister for Transport; 1976–1984	Succeeded by Barrie Unsworth
Preceded by Tim Bruxner	Minister for Highways; 1976–1978	Succeeded by Harry Jensen
Preceded by Rodney Cavalier as Minister for Energy	Minister for Mineral Resources and Energy; 1984–1986	Portfolio abolished
New portfolio	Minister for Energy and Technology; 1986–1987	Succeeded by Ken Gabb as Minister for Minerals and Energy
Preceded by Neville Wran	Minister for Industry and Small Business; 1986–1987	portfolio abolished
Preceded by Laurie Brereton as Minister for Public Works and Ports	Minister for Public Works; 1987–1988	Succeeded by Wal Murray
