= Barbara Perry (politician) =

Australian politician

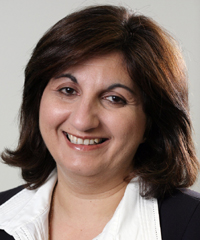

Appointed member of Central Darling Shire Council
- Incumbent
- Assumed office 27 October 2025 Serving with Bob Stewart and Fiona Kelly
- Minister: Ron Hoenig
- Preceded by: Office established

Minister for Local Government
- In office 8 September 2008 – 28 March 2011
- Premier: Nathan Rees; Kristina Keneally
- Preceded by: Paul Lynch
- Succeeded by: Don Page

Member of the New South Wales Legislative Assembly for Auburn
- In office 8 September 2001 – 6 March 2015
- Preceded by: Peter Nagle
- Succeeded by: Luke Foley

Councillor on Auburn City Council
- In office 1995–2002

Personal details
- Born: Barbara Mazzel Anne Abood; 6 April 1964 (age 62) Auburn, New South Wales, Australia
- Party: Australian Labor Party
- Spouse: Michael Perry
- Children: 5
- Education: University of Sydney
- Occupation: Lawyer

Barbara Mazzel Anne Perry (born 6 April 1964) is an Australian former politician, representing Auburn for the Labor Party in the New South Wales Legislative Assembly from 2001 to 2015. Perry was the first woman of Lebanese origin to be elected to the New South Wales Legislative Assembly.

== Early years and background ==
One of five children, Perry is the daughter of Lebanese immigrants, Ralph and Susan Abood, and is married to Michael Perry with five sons. She was educated by the Sisters of Charity and the Marist Brothers before graduating in law from the University of Sydney, commencing work with the Legal Aid Commission of New South Wales in 1990.

== Political career ==
Prior to entering state politics, Perry was a member of Auburn City Council from 1995 to 2002.

Perry was elected in a by-election on 8 September 2001 following the resignation of Labor Member Peter Nagle and re-elected at the 2003, 2007 and 2011 state elections.

Following the 2007 state election, Perry was appointed Minister for Juvenile Justice, Minister for Western Sydney and Minister Assisting the Premier on Citizenship in the second Iemma ministry, serving until December 2008. In December 2009, Perry was appointed to the Keneally ministry as Minister for Local Government and Minister Assisting the Minister for Mental Health, taking on the additional responsibilities of Minister for Juvenile Justice in June 2010. Perry retained these portfolios until the 2011 state election when Labor was defeated at the polls. Subsequently, Perry was appointed Shadow Minister for Family and Community Services, Shadow Minister for Aboriginal Affairs and Shadow Minister for Ageing and Disability Services.

On 7 January 2015, after a bitter pre-selection contest, Perry announced that she would not seek Labor endorsement for the 2015 state election. She stood down in order to make way for newly elected leader Luke Foley to have a clear run for her seat. Foley needed to contest a Legislative Assembly seat as he was a member of the Legislative Council.

On 27 October 2025, Perry was appointed by Ron Hoenig, Minister for Local Government, as one of the three inaugural appointed members of Central Darling Shire Council under its new Regional and Remote Council structure.

New South Wales Legislative Assembly
| Preceded by Peter Nagle | Member for Auburn; 2001–2015 | Succeeded by Luke Foley |
Political offices
| Preceded by Paul Lynch | Minister for Local Government; 2008–2011 | Succeeded by Don Page |
