= New South Wales Civil and Administrative Tribunal =

Tribunal in New South Wales, Australia

Legal tribunal overview
- Formed: 1 January 2014
- Preceding Legal tribunal: Administrative Decisions Tribunal, Consumer, Trader and Tenancy Tribunal, Guardianship Tribunal, Nurses and Midwives Tribunal, Physiotherapists Tribunal and 17 other tribunals
- Jurisdiction: New South Wales
- Headquarters: Level 9, John Maddison Tower, 86–90 Goulburn Street, Sydney
- Legal tribunal executive: The Hon Justice Lea Armstrong, President
- Parent Legal tribunal: Supreme Court of New South Wales
- Key document: Civil and Administrative Tribunal Act 2013 (NSW)
- Website: www.ncat.nsw.gov.au

The New South Wales Civil and Administrative Tribunal (NCAT) is a civil law and administrative law tribunal in New South Wales established by statute on 1 January 2014.

It replaced and aggregated the matters of a number of disparate tribunals.

The NCAT specifically replaced the Administrative Decisions Tribunal of New South Wales and the work of a former 21 other tribunals into a single point of access for specialist tribunal services in NSW.

== Organisational structure ==
The NCAT has four operational divisions:

- Administrative and Equal Opportunity Division
- Consumer and Commercial Division
- Guardianship Division
- Occupational Division

Given certain circumstances parties may appeal decisions to NCAT's Internal Appeal Panel. Internal appeals are made on questions of law. Applications can only be made about the merits of a decision if the Appeal Panel gives permission. Some Division decisions are not subject to an internal appeal and may be appealed directly to the Supreme Court or Court of Appeal.

== Current jurisdictional error issues for NCAT ==
On Friday, 3 February 2017, the New South Wales Court of Appeal issued a declaration that the NSW Administrative and Civil Tribunal (NCAT) (which handles a range of small civil disputes), has no jurisdiction if one party lives in another state. The Court held, inter alia, that a State tribunal which is not a “court of a State” is unable to exercise judicial power to determine matters between residents of two States because the State law which purports to authorise the tribunal to do so is inconsistent with the conditional investment by s 39(2) of the Judiciary Act of all such jurisdiction in State courts, and therefore rendered inoperative by virtue of the inconsistency of laws provision under s 109 of the Commonwealth of Australia Constitution Act 1900 (Cth).

On Thursday, 22 June 2017, Justices Gordon and Edelman of the High Court of Australia granted special leave to appeal the decision of the New South Wales Court of Appeal to the High Court.

It was believed that the practical effect of this decision is that tenants in New South Wales could discover their tenancy agreements are unenforceable if their landlord lives interstate.

== Alternatives to appeal ==
The Tribunal, in its Guideline on Appeals, indicates that an appeal may not always be the most appropriate course when there is a difficulty or problem with a decision of the Tribunal. The Tribunal points out that, as an alternative to appealing, a party can:

- ask the Tribunal to set aside the decision (where all parties consent, or where the Tribunal is satisfied that a decision made in a party's absence has resulted in the party's case not being adequately put to the tribunal)
- ask the Tribunal to set aside proceedings or a decision (where there has been a failure to comply with certain procedural rules)
- ask the Tribunal to correct an obvious error in a decision or reasons for a decision (for example, clerical errors, accidental omissions, defects in forms or inconsistencies between the orders and the reasons for a decision)

== See also ==
- List of New South Wales courts and tribunals
