= Edgar Dring =

Australian politician

Personal details
- Born: 18 March 1896 Gol Gol, New South Wales
- Died: 17 December 1955 (aged 59) Mildura, Victoria
- Party: Labor Party

Edgar Percy Dring (18 March 1896 – 17 December 1955) was an Australian politician. He was a member of the New South Wales Legislative Assembly from 1941 until his death in 1955. He was a member of the Labor Party (ALP).

Dring was born in Gol Gol, New South Wales. He was the son of a farmer and was educated at Gol Gol Public School and Hereford House teacher training school in Sydney. He taught in several high schools in Sydney and rural New South Wales and was elected as a councillor on Parkes Shire Council from 1947 to 1953. After losing at the 1938 election, Dring was elected to the New South Wales Parliament at the subsequent election as the Labor Party member for Ashburnham. He defeated the incumbent Country Party member Hilton Elliott. He retained the seat at the next 2 elections but the electorate was abolished by a re-distribution prior to the 1950 election. He stood for the urban seat of Auburn and defeated the Lang Labor incumbent Chris Lang, the son of party founder Jack Lang. He retained the seat until his death in 1955. Following his death, the seat became vacant for 4 months prior to the following 1956 election. He did not hold ministerial or parliamentary office but was the secretary of the parliamentary Labor Party caucus from 1947 until 1953.

New South Wales Legislative Assembly
Preceded by Hilton Elliott	Member for Ashburnham; 1941 – 1950	Succeeded by seat abolished
Preceded by Chris Lang	Member for Auburn; 1950 – 1955	Succeeded by Thomas Ryan
