= Luke Foley =

Australian Labor Party politician

The Honourable Luke Foley MP
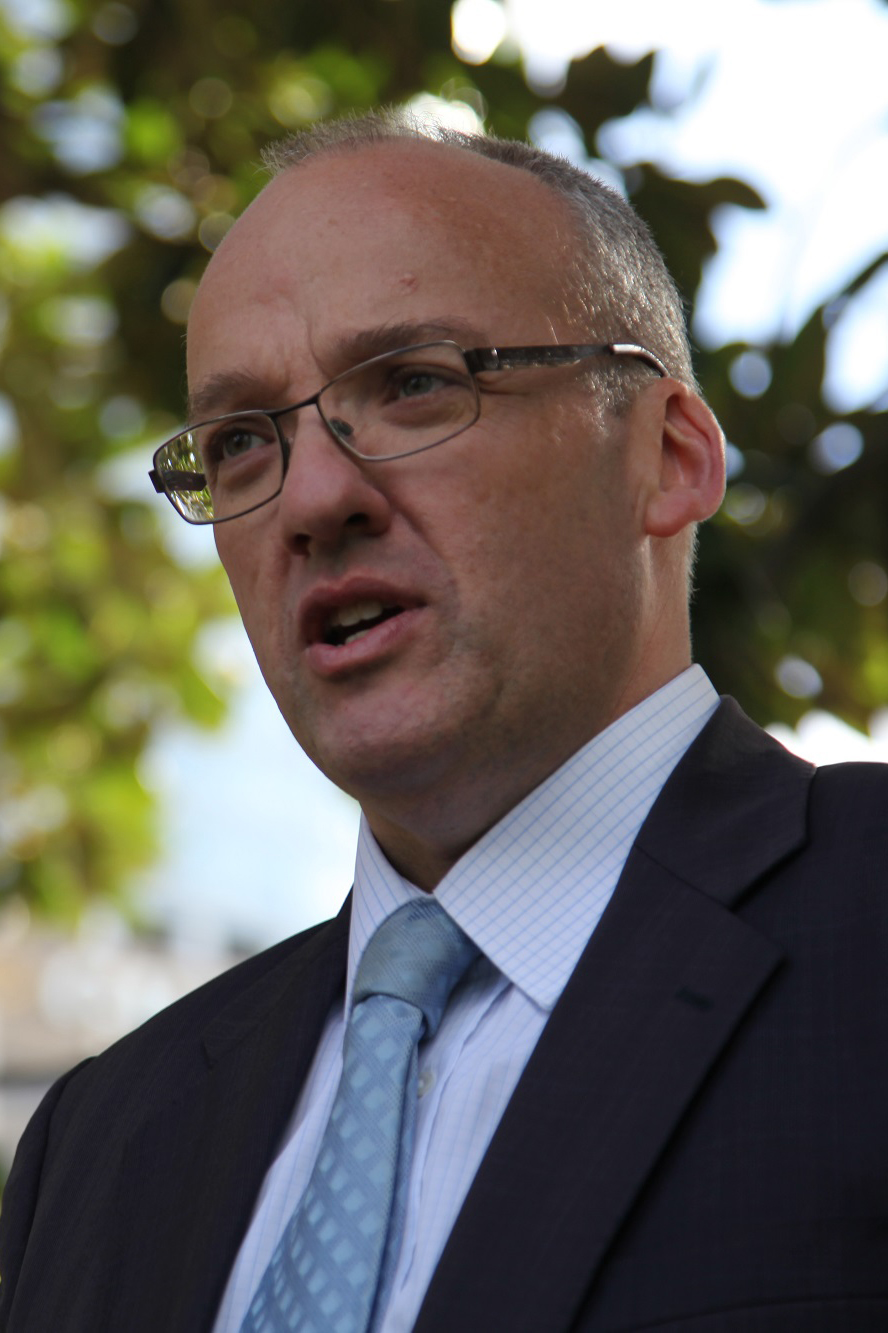

37th Leader of the Opposition in New South Wales Elections: 2015
- In office 5 January 2015 – 8 November 2018
- Premier: Mike Baird; Gladys Berejiklian
- Deputy: Linda Burney; Michael Daley
- Preceded by: John Robertson
- Succeeded by: Michael Daley

Leader of the Labor Party in New South Wales
- In office 5 January 2015 – 8 November 2018
- Deputy: Linda Burney; Michael Daley
- Preceded by: John Robertson
- Succeeded by: Michael Daley

Member of the New South Wales Legislative Assembly for Auburn
- In office 28 March 2015 – 23 March 2019
- Preceded by: Barbara Perry
- Succeeded by: Lynda Voltz
Legislative Council
16th Leader of the Opposition in the Legislative Council
In office 14 June 2011 – 6 March 2015
Leader	John Robertson; Himself
Preceded by	Tony Kelly
Succeeded by	Adam Searle
Deputy Leader of the Opposition in the Legislative Council
In office 8 April 2011 – 14 June 2011
Leader	Tony Kelly
Succeeded by	Adam Searle
Member of the New South Wales Legislative Council
In office 19 June 2010 – 6 March 2015
Preceded by	Ian Macdonald

Personal details
- Born: Luke Aquinas Foley; 27 June 1970 (age 56) Sydney, New South Wales, Australia
- Party: Labor
- Spouse: Edel McKenna
- Children: 3
- Education: University of New South Wales (BA)

Luke Aquinas Foley (born 27 June 1970) is a former Australian Labor Party politician who served as the Leader of the Opposition in the Parliament of New South Wales from 2015 to 2018. Foley was a member of the New South Wales Legislative Council since 19 June 2010 until his resignation to contest the Legislative Assembly seat of Auburn at the 2015 New South Wales election. Foley resigned after it was alleged that he had indecently assaulted an ABC journalist. Foley denies the allegations.

== Early years and education ==
Foley was born in Sydney and from the age of seven was raised solely by his mother. In an interview conducted when he became NSW Opposition Leader, Foley stated his mother instilled in him a triple faith of "the Labor Party, the Catholic Church and the Eastern Suburbs Rugby League Club".

Foley was active in student representative politics at university and graduated with a Bachelor of Arts from the University of New South Wales, the first in his family to attend university.

Foley is a keen cricketer. In 1999, he worked as an accredited Triple J cricket correspondent reporting from the Australian/West Indies series in the Caribbean.

== Career ==
Starting his working life while a student as a telemarketer for the Guide Dog Association of NSW 1988–90, Foley became NSW President of the National Union of Students 1991, and then worked in the office of Labor Senator Bruce Childs 1992–96.

Between 1996 and 2000, he was a union organiser with the NSW branch of the Australian Services Union and became Secretary of that branch between 2000 and 2003. This involved representing the interests of charity and drug and alcohol rehabilitation workers. Referring to that period in his first speech in the NSW Parliament, Foley stated:

For seven years I organised and represented workers predominantly working in the social and community services sector. These men and women work with the downtrodden, the excluded and the marginalised. They are ordinary workers who do extraordinary things. They are passionate and dedicated and they are underpaid and undervalued. What does it say about our values as a society when these men and women are among our lowest paid workers? Community workers make a difference every day. It is time we properly recognised them for the work they do.

— Luke Foley, inaugural speech in the NSW Legislative Council, 1 September 2010.

A member of Labor's left faction, before his appointment to the Legislative Council, Foley was the assistant general secretary of the New South Wales Labor Party from 2003 to 2010.

Foley was a sportswriter for The Punch from 2009.

== Political career ==
Foley was appointed to the Legislative Council to fill the vacancy caused by the resignation of Ian Macdonald. He describes himself as a "practising Catholic on the Left of politics"

Foley voted in favour of same sex adoption bill in 2010 and in 2015 announced his support behind federal legislation for same-sex marriage. Foley said: "I have an open mind. I continue to talk to many people, including gay and lesbian friends of mine about this issue".

Following the resignation of John Robertson as leader of the parliamentary Labor Party, Foley contested the leadership in the vote held on 5 January 2015. After the withdrawal of Michael Daley and Steve Whan as leadership contenders, Foley was elected unopposed. He was endorsed as the Labor candidate for the safe Labor seat of Auburn at the 2015 state election, after the incumbent member Barbara Perry stood aside to allow him to transfer to the lower house from the Legislative Council. He went on to win the seat, however, with a small swing against his party in the electorate. Foley did manage to pick up a 11-seat swing, and recovered much of what Labor had lost four years earlier. Notably, Labor regained many seats in its longstanding heartlands of west Sydney, the Central Coast, and the Hunter that had been swept up by the Coalition. It reduced the Coalition majority from 14 seats to seven.

In October 2018, NSW Corrections Minister David Elliott raised an allegation in the Legislative Assembly about an incident where Foley had "a little bit too much to drink at a party and harassed an ABC journalist." Later that month, ABC journalist Ashleigh Raper released a statement, alleging that at an event in November 2016, Foley "placed his hand down the back of her dress and inside her underpants." Hours later, Foley read a statement in which he resigned as leader of the Labor Party, but denied the allegation and said he would commence defamation proceedings against Raper in the Federal Court. Later in November, he dropped the case against Raper.

=== Views ===
Foley has stated his values are "social democratic values":

I believe that governments should direct resources to overcome disadvantage. The sum of our individual decisions does not add up to the kind of society that we want to live in. I believe in a strong society where we owe obligations to each other. What gives us in the Labor Party moral purpose is our conviction that the fortunate have a responsibility to the unfortunate, that the strong should help the weak.

— Foley, delivering his inaugural speech to the Legislative Council of New South Wales, in 2010.

In 2018, Foley talked about White flight. He was condemned by Premier Gladys Berejiklian for his view that an influx of people of non-European descent had driven many Anglo Australians to leave parts of Sydney.

== Personal life ==
Foley is married to Edel McKenna and they have three children.

Foley is a member of the Summer Hill Seniors Cricket Club, a member of the Sydney Cricket Ground since 1992, and an executive member of the Victor Trumper Society. He is also a supporter of the Eastern Suburbs Rugby League Club.

== See also ==
- Shadow Ministry of Luke Foley

Political offices
Preceded by John Robertson	Leader of the Opposition in New South Wales; 2015–2018	Succeeded by Michael Daley
Party political offices
Preceded by John Robertson	Leader of the Labor Party in New South Wales; 2015–2018	Succeeded by Michael Daley
New South Wales Legislative Assembly
Preceded by Barbara Perry	Member for Auburn; 2015–2019	Succeeded by Lynda Voltz
