= Chris Lang (politician) =

Australian politician (1910–2002)

James Christian Lang (25 March 1910 – 14 December 2002), usually known as Chris Lang, was an Australian politician. The son of Jack Lang, Premier of New South Wales 1925–27 and 1930–32, he succeeded his father as the member for Auburn in the New South Wales Legislative Assembly, serving from 1946 to 1950.

Born in Homebush, Lang was educated at North Auburn Public School and Burwood Intermediate High School before entering his father's real estate business, Lang and Daes, in 1925. In 1930, he became the manager, remaining so until 1958, when he became the manager of his own real estate company until 1962. On 22 February 1933, he married Mary Dowling, with whom he had three children. He also served as secretary of the Auburn Starr-Bowkett Co-operative Building Societies.

In 1946, Jack Lang resigned from state parliament to run for the federal seat of Reid, resulting in a by-election for the state seat of Auburn. By that time, both the federal and state branches of the Australian Labor Party had repudiated the former Premier, who endorsed his son to run under the Lang Labor banner. Chris Lang was successful, achieving 52.32% of the primary vote and easily defeating the official Labor candidate, helped by the absence of a Liberal candidate. Lang thus joined Lilian Fowler as one of two Lang Labor MPs.

Lang was forced to rely on preferences at the 1947 state election, when independent Alexander Kerr won 22.2% of the vote. Despite the fact that the majority of those preferences flowed to the official Labor candidate, Lang's primary vote lead was enough to retain the seat. In 1950, however, there was a redistribution, and Edgar Dring, the sitting Labor MP for the abolished rural seat of Ashburnham, contested the new seat. By that time, Lang Labor was in decline (Jack Lang had lost his federal seat the previous year), and Chris Lang was effectively an independent Labor candidate. The Liberal Party contested the seat, with the result that Dring easily defeated Lang. Lang contested Auburn again in 1953 and 1956, but never came close to winning.

During the 1960s, he was a gardener at St Joseph's Hospital at Auburn. He died on 14 December 2002 at Auburn.

New South Wales Legislative Assembly
Preceded by Jack Lang	Member for Auburn; 1946–1950	Succeeded by Edgar Dring
