= City of Auburn =

Former local government area in New South Wales, Australia

Auburn City Council
- Local government area
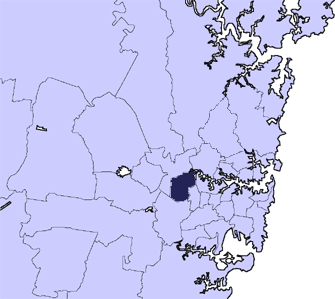
- Location in Metropolitan Sydney, 1949–2016

- Coordinates: 33°51′S 151°02′E
- Country: Australia
- State: New South Wales
- Region: Western Sydney
- Established: 19 February 1892
- Abolished: 12 May 2016
- Council seat: Auburn Civic Centre, Auburn

Government
  - Administrator: Viv May PSM

Area
  - Total: 32 km^{2} (12 sq mi)

Population
  - Total: 80,892 (2011)
  - Density: 2,527.88/km^{2} (6,547.2/sq mi)
- Parish: St John; Liberty Plains
- Website: Auburn City Council
LGAs around Auburn City Council
Parramatta	Parramatta	Ryde
Parramatta	Auburn City Council	Canada Bay
Bankstown	Bankstown	Strathfield

Auburn City Council (officially known as the City of Auburn) was a local government area in the Greater Western Sydney region of New South Wales, Australia. Prior to its 2016 merger, the council area was located about 15 kilometres (9.3 mi) west of the Sydney central business district and had a culturally diverse population. Notable features in the area included the Gallipoli Mosque, located in the suburb of Auburn. The suburb of Sydney Olympic Park, the site of the main venues of the 2000 Summer Olympics, was located in the council area.

On 10 February 2016 the Auburn City Council was suspended by the Minister for Local Government, and an administrator appointed. A public enquiry was held into allegations of "councillors misusing their positions." Prior to the suspension, the Mayor of Auburn City Council was Councillor Le Lam. On 12 May 2016, as part of a NSW State Government program of local government reform, Auburn City Council was abolished. Parts of Auburn City Council, Parramatta City Council, and Holroyd City Council merged to form the Cumberland Council as a new local government area. The remainder of the Auburn City Council area was merged into the City of Parramatta Council.

== History ==
Prior to European settlement, the Wangal Aboriginal people lived around the Auburn area. European settlement began in the 1790s. The Auburn area was a farming area, known as "Liberty Plains", which became the name of the local parish.

The Borough of Auburn was proclaimed on 19 February 1892 and became the Municipality of Auburn in 1906. On 20 June 1906, the hitherto unincorporated area around Silverwater and Newington was combined into the Municipality of Auburn, becoming the "Newington Ward" returning three aldermen. The secretary of the Newington Progress Association who led local efforts to join Auburn, future NSW premier Jack Lang, was elected to first position in the new ward in 1907, and served as Mayor of Auburn in 1909–1911.

To the east, the Borough of Rookwood was proclaimed on 8 December 1891. In 1913 Rookwood was renamed "Lidcombe", a portmanteau of the names of the two previous mayors, in an attempt to distance the municipality from the necropolis. On 1 January 1949, with the passing of the Local Government (Areas) Act 1948, the Municipalities of Auburn and Lidcombe were amalgamated to form the new "Municipality of Auburn". In 1993, a change in the law meant that "municipality" ceased to be a legal category of local government area and Auburn Municipal Council became "Auburn Council".

=== Auburn council seats ===
The opening of the second Auburn Town Hall, Auburn Road, 12 July 1927.

The first meeting of the council was held in Lee's Temperance Hotel at the corner of Mary Street and Park Road, Auburn, in 1892, and the foundation stone of the first Auburn Town Hall, incorporating a post office, on Auburn Road was laid in 1896 by the Postmaster-General, Joseph Cook. Designed by E. A. Henry and built by Wilkins & Fewster of Granville, the town hall was also officially opened by Cook on 29 June 1898.

This building was short-lived however, and was replaced in 1926–1927 on the same site by the second Town Hall which was designed by the mayor, Albert Thomas "Benny" Briggs, and built by H. M. Crouch. The former Auburn mayor and then state Premier, Jack Lang, laid the foundation stone on 6 November 1926 and officially opened the building on 12 July 1927. On the official opening, Lang declared: "When the old Town Hall in Auburn, which is being demolished, was opened in 1898, the population did not exceed 2000; while to-day the town has grown so rapidly that, to say the population exceeds 20,000, is a conservative estimate, and Auburn has outgrown its Town Hall."

Following amalgamation in 1949, council meetings were initially divided between the Lidcombe Town Hall and the Auburn Town Hall on Auburn Road, but eventually all functions were moved to the Auburn Town Hall. This continued until the completion of the Auburn Administrative Building, which was officially opened by the mayor, Stanley Hedges, on 10 July 1965. It was situated at the rear of the existing Town Hall on a block fronting Susan and Queen Street, Auburn and was completed at a final cost of AU£198,000.

This remained the council seat until council commissioned in 2000 Michael Davies Architecture to create a new Civic Centre on the same site, incorporating council offices, chambers, city library and police station. Council first met in the new Civic Centre on 26 September 2000. The Civic Centre project won the Local Government Property Award at the 2001 Australian Property Institute Excellence in Property Awards.

=== Auburn Botanic Gardens ===
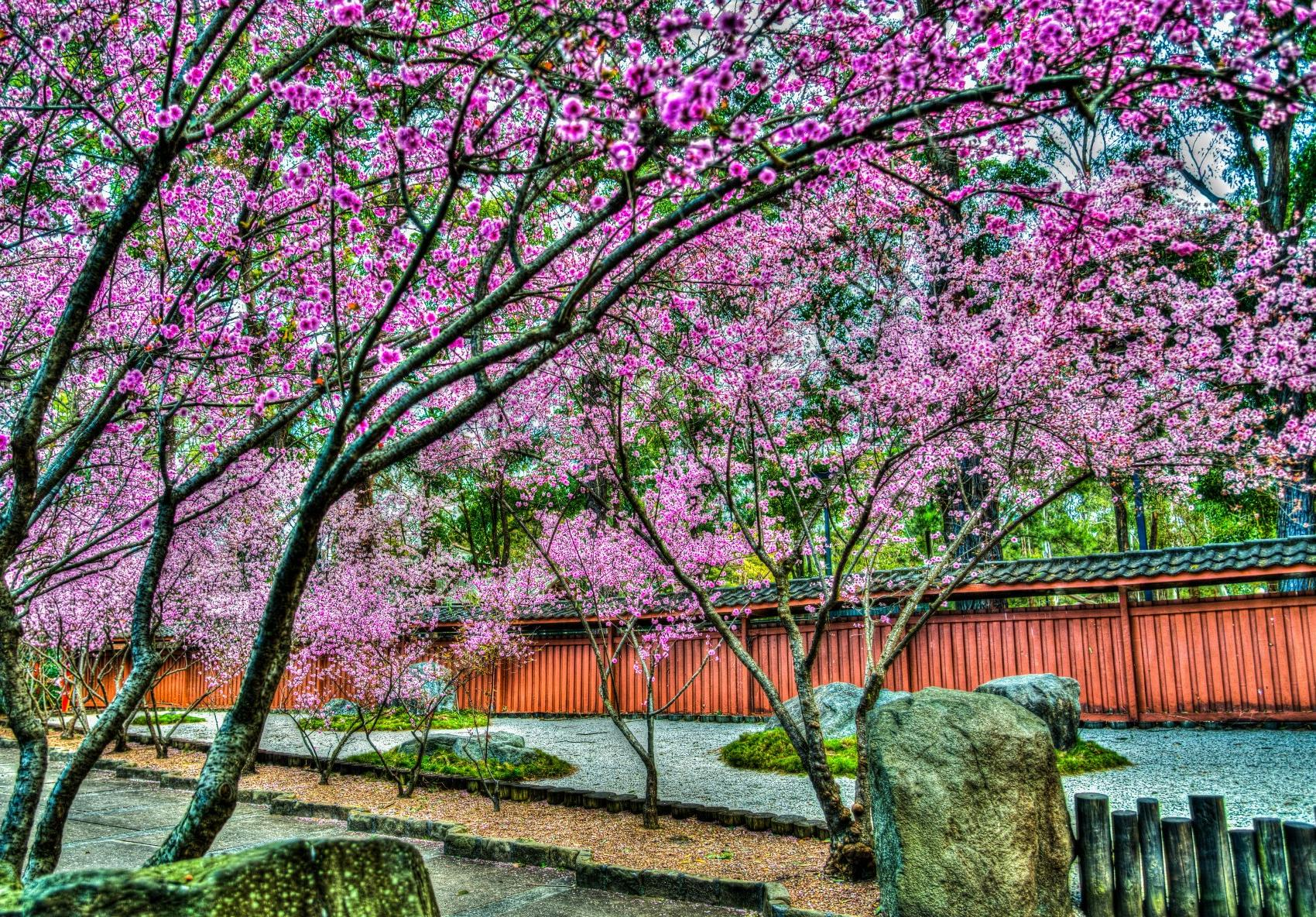
Cherry blossom trees in the Japanese Garden of the Auburn Botanic Gardens.

The Auburn Botanic Gardens originated from the County of Cumberland planning scheme (1946–1951) which set aside the area along the banks of the Duck River for recreation. Both before and after the scheme, Auburn council dumped rubbish and sewage along the banks and in brick and tile clay-pits for many years. In July 1968, Eric Black, the chief engineer of Auburn Municipal Council from 1949 to 1979, presented a detailed report to the council on proposing a mixture of sporting grounds and intensive cultivation of the Duck River parklands. Black envisaged a series of gardens representing national styles from around the world. This vision was later reduced, though some elements survived, including the Japanese gardens and lake, the formal gardens and reflection pool, and the different Australian habitats.

Construction work on the Botanic Gardens site began in 1969 and involved the excavation of the Japanese Gardens Lake. In 1973, hundreds of trees were planted in the Avenue of Remembrance, Garden of Trees and Woodland area. The gardens were opened by New South Wales governor Sir Roden Cutler on 11 September 1977.

=== City status ===
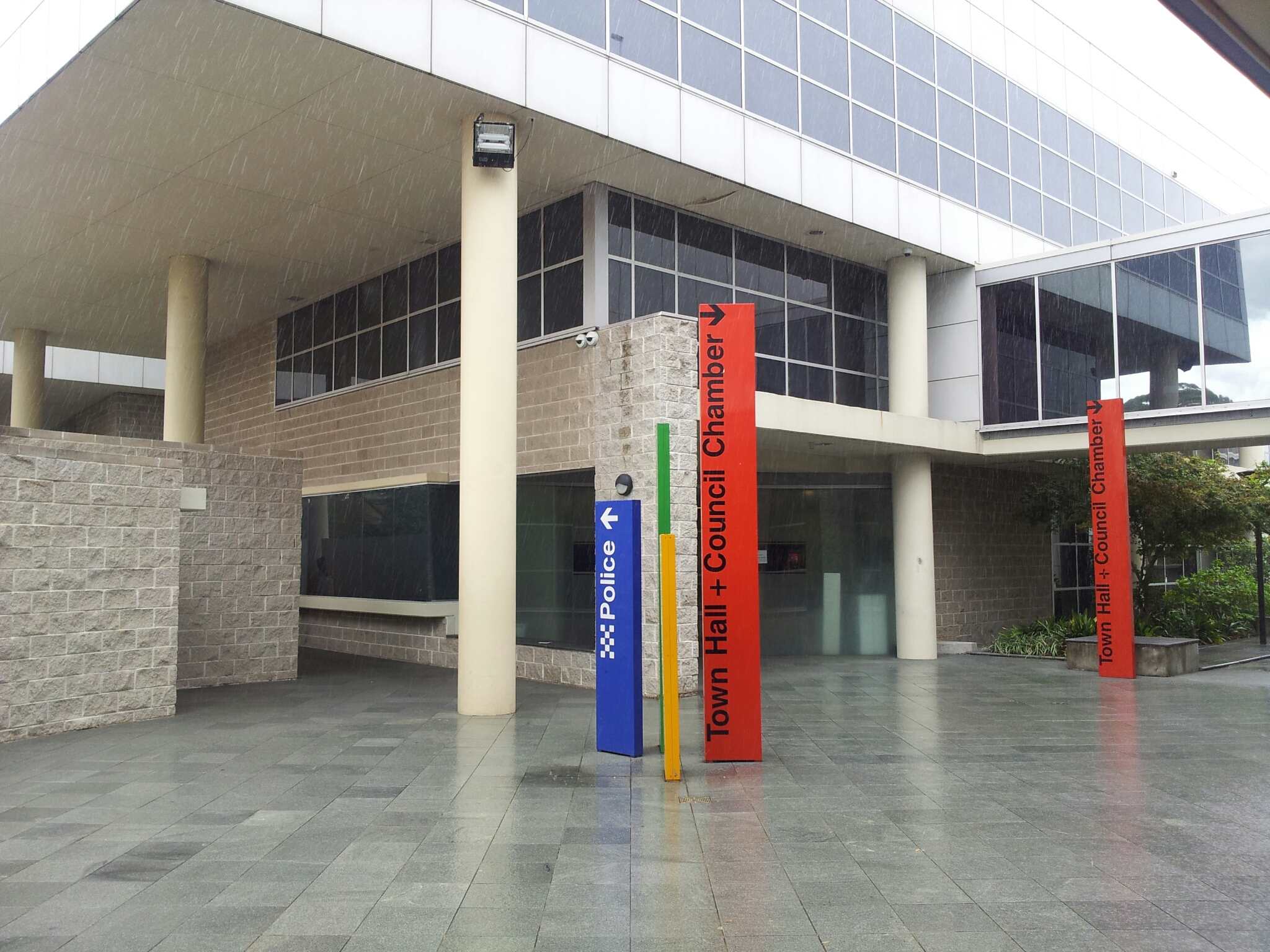
Auburn Civic Centre in 2013.

A project by Auburn Council to seek city status began in April 2006. A special poll held on 13 September 2008 found a large proportion (72.4%) of the electorate supported the project. On 24 June 2009 Governor of New South Wales Marie Bashir issued a proclamation granting Auburn city status, which was gazetted on 17 July 2009 as "Auburn City Council".

=== Council dysfunction and suspension ===
In March 2013, Auburn council voted to dismiss the general manager since 2005, John Burgess, in a decision derided as entirely political and resulting from the general manager's release of information relating to the corrupt activities of former councillor and deputy mayor, Jack Au, to the ICAC, who was subsequently suspended by the Minister for Local Government. On his departure, the general manager noted "I think that there needs to be a high-level policy review to ensure that similar circumstances are not allowed to exist in other councils, [...] All general managers should be objectively assessed based on performance."

In 2015–16, council came under increasing scrutiny when the deputy mayor, Salim Mehajer was charged with threatening the father of one of the victims in the 2014 Sydney hostage crisis and was investigated over a conflict of interest when he voted on council matters regarding rezoning despite it being alleged that he had pecuniary interests in those matters. As a result, Mehajer was given a four-month suspension from Council on 29 January 2016.

On 10 February 2016, the Council was suspended while a public enquiry into allegations of "councillors misusing their positions" was conducted. An administrator, former Mosman Council General Manager Viv May, was appointed to manage the affairs of the council in the interim. On 18 February the administrator reversed decisions for two major developments that were set to benefit Mehajer. The former Liberal mayor, Ronney Oueik, later appeared before the state government public inquiry conducted by Commissioner Richard Beasley SC, and denied suggestions that he had shown favouritism in several planning decisions, as well as opposing developments of political opponents. Oueik later sued NSW opposition leader (and Member for Auburn), Luke Foley, whom he had stood against as the Liberal candidate at the 2015 election, for defamation following Foley's comments to media that he had represented "self-interest, not community interest" during his time as mayor. This defamation suit was thrown out of court in October 2017. In April 2018, Mehajer was convicted on multiple counts of electoral fraud relating to his election at the 2012 Auburn Council election. He was sentenced on 22 June 2018 to 21 months in prison with a non-parole period of 11 months.

=== 2016 amalgamations ===
A 2015 review of local government boundaries by the NSW Government Independent Pricing and Regulatory Tribunal recommended that the City of Auburn merge with adjoining councils. The government considered two proposals. The first proposed a merger of parts of Auburn, Holroyd and Parramatta to form a new council with an area of 72 square kilometres (28 sq mi) and support a population of approximately 219,000. The second proposed a merger of parts of Parramatta, Auburn, The Hills, Hornsby, and Holroyd to form a new council with an area of 82 square kilometres (32 sq mi) and support a population of approximately 215,725.

On 12 May 2016, Auburn City Council was abolished by the NSW Government. Parts of Auburn City Council (south of the M4 Western Motorway) and Parramatta City Council (Woodville Ward), and Holroyd City Council merged to form the Cumberland Council as a new local government area. The remainder of the Auburn City Council area north of the M4 Western Motorway (including parts of the Sydney Olympic Park) was merged into the City of Parramatta Council.

At the last meeting of the Cumberland Council to be held at the Auburn Civic Centre on 21 December 2016, with the council chambers being taken over by the Auburn Library, the administrator, Viv May, noted:

"It is no secret that in recent years these Chambers bore witness to behaviour by a select few Councillors and staff that did not meet the minimum standards of probity, transparency or decency that the public has every right to expect from its public officials. If not for the intervention of other arms of Government or the continued efforts of other Councillors, this behaviour would have continued. To dwell on the negative is to omit from this story the wonderful contributions of many people who did seek to act in the interest of the public, including past Alderman, Councillors and Council Staff. Their public service is honoured and recognised."

== Suburbs in the local government area ==
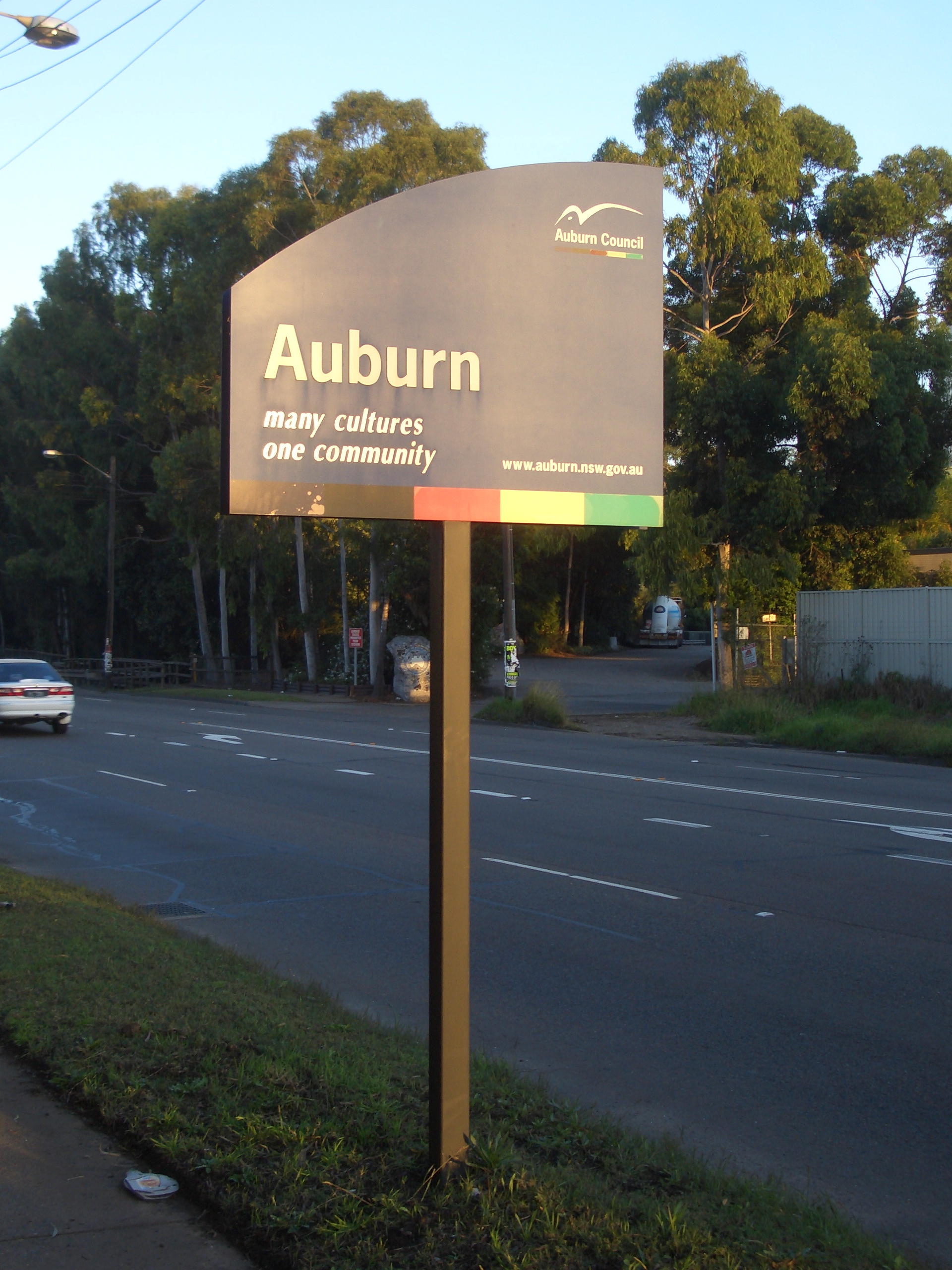
Auburn Council sign, Parramatta Road

Suburbs within the Auburn City boundaries immediately prior to its abolition were:

- Auburn
- Berala
- Lidcombe
- Newington
- Regents Park (With parts within the City of Bankstown)
- Rookwood
- Silverwater
- Sydney Olympic Park
- Wentworth Point
- Granville (Parts within City of Parramatta and City of Holroyd)

Homebush Bay had previously been a suburb but was subsequently divided between Sydney Olympic Park, Wentworth Point and Lidcombe.

== Demographics ==
At the 2011 Census, there were 73,738 people in the Auburn local government area, of these 51.8% were male and 48.2% were female. Aboriginal and Torres Strait Islander people made up 0.6% of the population. The median age of people in the Auburn area was 31 years, which is significantly lower than the national median of 37 years. Children aged 0 – 14 years made up 19.7% of the population and people aged 65 years and over made up 8.5% of the population. Of people in the area aged 15 years and over, 53.2% were married and 8.9% were either divorced or separated.

Population growth in the Auburn area between the 2001 Census and the 2006 Census was 16.31%; and in the subsequent five years to the 2011 Census, population growth was 13.51%. When compared with total population growth of Australia for the same periods, being 5.78% and 8.32% respectively, population growth in Auburn local government area was double the national average. The median weekly income for residents within the Auburn area was lower than the national average, being one of the factors that place the City in an area of social disadvantage.

At the 2011 Census, the proportion of residents in the Auburn local government area who stated their ancestry as Chinese, or as Lebanese, was in excess of six times the national average. The proportion of residents who stated an affiliation with Islam was in excess of eleven times the national average. Meanwhile, as at the Census date, the area was linguistically diverse, with Arabic, Cantonese, Mandarin, Turkish, and Korean languages spoken in households, and ranged from five times to 22 times the national averages.

Selected historical census data for Auburn local government area
Census year		2001	2006	2011
Population	Estimated residents on Census night	55,851	64,959	73,738
Population	LGA rank in terms of size within New South Wales			
Population	% of New South Wales population			1.07%
Population	% of Australian population	0.30%	▲0.33%	▲0.34%
Cultural and language diversity				
Ancestry, top responses	Chinese			20.1%
Ancestry, top responses	Australian			7.5%
Ancestry, top responses	English			7.0%
Ancestry, top responses	Lebanese			6.3%
Ancestry, top responses	Turkish			5.9%
Language, top responses (other than English)	Arabic	13.6%	▲12.5%	▼10.7%
Language, top responses (other than English)	Cantonese	11.3%	▲10.6%	▼9.9%
Language, top responses (other than English)	Mandarin	4.8%	▲7.0%	▲9.2%
Language, top responses (other than English)	Turkish	7.5%	▼7.2%	▼6.7%
Language, top responses (other than English)	Korean	n/c	▲3.2%	▲5.0%
Religious affiliation				
Religious affiliation, top responses	Islam	23.4%	24.8%	▲25.5%
Religious affiliation, top responses	Catholic	22.7%	▲19.7%	▼18.3%
Religious affiliation, top responses	No Religion	9.7%	▲11.7%	▲14.5%
Religious affiliation, top responses	Buddhism	9.9%	▼9.2%	▼9.1%
Religious affiliation, top responses	Hinduism	3.0%	▲3.1%	▲5.1%
Median weekly incomes				
Personal income	Median weekly personal income		A$343	A$420
Personal income	% of Australian median income		73.6%	72.8%
Family income	Median weekly family income		A$906	A$1,161
Family income	% of Australian median income		88.2%	78.4%
Household income	Median weekly household income		A$991	A$1,160
Household income	% of Australian median income		84.6%	94.0%

== Council ==
Following the dismissal of the councillors on 10 February 2016 and until the council's abolition on 12 May 2016, it was managed by a government-appointed administrator, Viv May PSM, a former general manager of Mosman Council, who reported directly to the Minister for Local Government.

=== Final composition and election method ===
Auburn Council was composed of ten councillors elected proportionally as two separate wards, each electing five councillors. All councillors were elected for a fixed four-year term of office. The mayor and deputy mayor were elected by the councillors at the first meeting of the council, typically in September. The last election was held on 8 September 2012 and the council was suspended on 10 February 2016. The final makeup of the council, prior to suspension, was as follows:

Ward	Councillor	Party	Office	Notes
First Ward	Ronney Oueik	Liberal	Mayor 2010–2012, 2014–2015	
First Ward	Hicham Zraika	Labor	Mayor 2009–2010, 2013–2014	
First Ward	Semra Batik-Dundar	Residents Action Group for Auburn		
First Ward	Le Lam	Independent	Mayor 2006–2008, 2015–2016	Unity Party until 2011.
First Ward	Salim Mehajer	Independent	Deputy Mayor 2012–2016	Suspended on 29 January 2016.
Second Ward	Ned Attie	Liberal	Mayor 2012–2013	Elected to Cumberland Council Regents Park Ward, 2017.
Second Ward	George Campbell	Labor		Elected to Cumberland Council Regents Park Ward, 2017.
Second Ward	Irene Simms	Residents Action Group for Auburn	Mayor 2008–2009	
Second Ward	Steve Yang	Liberal		
Second Ward	Tony Oldfield	Communist		

=== Town Clerk/General Manager ===
The Local Government Act, 1993 removed the requirement that the administrative head of a council be a "Town or Shire Clerk" and specified that the head was to be known as the "General Manager". Auburn Council had previously recognised the changing nature of role in appointing the last Town Clerk as a "Town Clerk and General Manager", which lasted from 1992 to 1993.

General Manager	Term	Notes
John William Lees	13 May 1892 – 9 April 1901	
John Long, Jnr.	9 April 1901 – 31 August 1936	
Bryan J. Mooney	1 September 1936 – 1957	
Percival J. Casey	1957–1964	
Gordon J. Lane	1964–1981	
C. Goldsworthy	1981–1992	
D. J. Marks	1992–1995	
Lea Rosser	1995–2000	
Ray Brownlee PSM	2000 – February 2005	
John Burgess	February 2005 – March 2013	
Peter Fitzgerald (acting)	March 2013 – 30 September 2013	
Mark Brisby	30 September 2013 – 12 May 2016	

== Election results ==
=== 2012 ===
2012 New South Wales local elections: Auburn
Party	Votes	%	Swing	Seats	Change
Liberal	7,709	24.8	+9.6	3	▲1
Labor	6,993	22.5	−4.7	2	▼1
Independent	6,876	22.1	+7.7	2	▲1
Residents Action Group for Auburn Area	4,960	15.9	+2.9	2	▲1
Unity	1,604	5.2	−15.7	0	▼2
The Battler	1,588	5.1	+5.1	1	▲1
Greens	1,385	4.5	−4.9	0	▼1
Formal votes	31,115				

== Coat of arms and logo ==
Coat of arms of City of Auburn
Adopted 13 July 1970 Crest On a wreath of the colours, within a circlet of six mullets of eight points or, amid rushes an Eastern Swamphen (Porphyrio poliocephalus melantus) close proper. Escutcheon Per fess wavy vert and or, a pile reversed counter changed, three falcons' heads erased erminois on the vert and three millrinds sable on the or. Supporters On either side a Pegasus vert, wings addorsed argent, maned. hooved and gorged with a cable pendent therefrom by the ring an anchor or, and breathing flames proper. Motto Liberty With Steady Zeal Symbolism Escutcheon: The wavy line across the centre represents the Duck River, while the green and gold divides represent the colours of the Blaxland family. The Blaxland Arms also inspire the three falcons' heads in gold with black ermine spots. The triangular figure in the centre suggests the letter "A" for Auburn. The millrinds in the centre of gold divides allude to the estate agent firm of Mills & Pile, who arranged the first land sales in the area, and as a symbol of engineering and industry. Crest: The closed helmet represents the civic nature of the arms, while the decorative mantling is in the green and gold colours of the Blaxland family. The Eastern Swamphen among rushes alludes to the local fauna and the naming of the "Duck River". The circlet of gold eight pointed stars is from the State Arms. Supporters: Refer to Auburn's importance to state services, with the iron horse breathing flames symbolising the railways. Each horse is collared with a gold cable and anchor, taken from the Admiralty flag, alluding to the role of the Navy in the area, including the presence of the RAN Armament Depot Newington. The horses have white wings, making them a Pegasus, representing the RAAF. Motto: "Liberty" refers to the Parish of Liberty Plains and that the local area was first developed by free settlers rather than convicts. "With Steady Zeal" is taken from Oliver Goldsmith's poem The Deserted Village, the first line of which ("Sweet Auburn! loveliest village of the plain") inspired the area's name.

=== Logo ===
The council logo used until amalgamation in 2016 was based on the local Eastern Swamphen.
