= Electoral district of Auburn =

Auburn New South Wales—Legislative Assembly
- Interactive map of district boundaries since the 2023 state election
- State: New South Wales
- Created: 1927
- MP: Lynda Voltz
- Party: Labor Party
- Namesake: Auburn, New South Wales
- Electors: 59,152 (2023)
- Area: 32 km^{2} (12.4 sq mi)
- Demographic: Inner metropolitan
Electorates around Auburn:
Parramatta; Granville	Parramatta	Parramatta
Granville	Auburn	Strathfield
Fairfield	East Hills	Bankstown

Auburn is an electoral district of the Legislative Assembly of the Australian state of New South Wales in Sydney's West. It is currently represented by Lynda Voltz, after the 2019 election.

== Geography ==
On its current boundaries, Auburn includes the suburbs of Auburn, Berala, Birrong, Lidcombe, Potts Hill, Sefton, Rookwood, Wentworth Point and parts of Bankstown, Bass Hill, Chester Hill, Silverwater and Yagoona.

== Members ==
Member	Party	Term
Jack Lang	Labor	1927–1940
Jack Lang	Labor (N-C)	1940–1941
Jack Lang	Labor	1941–1943
Jack Lang	Lang Labor	1943–1946
Chris Lang	Lang Labor	1946–1950
Edgar Dring	Labor	1950–1955
Thomas Ryan	Labor	1956–1965
Peter Cox	Labor	1965–1988
Peter Nagle	Labor	1988–2001
Barbara Perry	Labor	2001–2015
Luke Foley	Labor	2015–2019
Lynda Voltz	Labor	2019–present

== History ==
Auburn was created in 1927. It has been held by the Labor Party for its entire existence, and for most of that time has been one of Labor's safest seats in New South Wales. It is considered a part of Labor's heartland in Western Sydney.

Auburn was once represented by former Premier, Jack Lang, and later by his son, Chris Lang. The seat was once vacant for four months; between December, 1955 and March, 1956; as a result of the death of Edgar Dring. A by-election was not held, given the relatively short amount of time left until the 1956 New South Wales state election.

== Election results ==
2023 New South Wales state election: Auburn
Party	Candidate	Votes	%	±%
Labor	Lynda Voltz	28,167	60.1	+6.0
Liberal	Haseen Zaman	9,327	19.9	−11.3
Greens	Masoomeh Asgari	3,237	6.9	+0.0
Liberal Democrats	Julie Morkos Douaihy	3,162	6.7	+6.7
	Jamal Daoud	1,733	3.7	+3.7
Sustainable Australia	Shelley Goed	1,227	2.6	+2.6
Total formal votes		46,853	93.4	−0.4
Informal votes		3,286	6.6	+0.4
Turnout		50,139	84.8	+0.5
Two-party-preferred result
Labor	Lynda Voltz	30,701	74.0	+10.3
Liberal	Haseen Zaman	10,793	26.0	−10.3
Labor hold		Swing	+10.3	
