= Electoral results for the district of Cessnock =

Election results for Cessnock, New South Wales, Australia

Cessnock, an electoral district of the Legislative Assembly in the Australian state of New South Wales has had two incarnations, the first from 1913 to 1920, the second from 1927 to the present.

Election	Member	Party
1913	William Kearsley	Labor
1917	William Kearsley	Labor
Election	Member	Party
1927	Jack Baddeley	Labor
1930	Jack Baddeley	Labor
1932	Jack Baddeley	Labor
1935	Jack Baddeley	Labor
1938	Jack Baddeley	Labor
1941	Jack Baddeley	Labor
1944	Jack Baddeley	Labor
1947	Jack Baddeley	Labor
1949 (by)	John Crook	Labor
1950	John Crook	Labor
1953	John Crook	Labor
1956	John Crook	Labor
1959	George Neilly	Labor
1962	George Neilly	Labor
1965	George Neilly	Labor
1968	George Neilly	Labor
1971	George Neilly	Labor
1973	George Neilly	Labor
1976	George Neilly	Labor
1978	Bob Brown	Labor
1981 (by)	Stan Neilly	Labor
1984	Stan Neilly	Labor
1988	Bob Roberts	Liberal
1991	Stan Neilly	Labor
1995	Stan Neilly	Labor
1999	Kerry Hickey	Labor
2003	Kerry Hickey	Labor
2007	Kerry Hickey	Labor
2011	Clayton Barr	Labor
2015	Clayton Barr	Labor
2019	Clayton Barr	Labor
2023	Clayton Barr	Labor

== Election results ==
=== Elections in the 2020s ===
==== 2023 ====
2023 New South Wales state election: Cessnock
Party	Candidate	Votes	%	±%
Labor	Clayton Barr	25,719	48.7	−6.1
One Nation	Quintin King	8,059	15.3	+15.3
Legalise Cannabis	Andrew Fenwick	6,294	11.9	+11.9
National	Ash Barnham (disendorsed)	5,877	11.1	−12.8
Greens	Llynda Nairn	3,476	6.6	−1.5
Animal Justice	Victoria Davies	2,141	4.1	−3.9
Sustainable Australia	Graham Jones	1,215	2.3	−2.9
Total formal votes		52,781	95.9	+1.0
Informal votes		2,231	4.1	−1.0
Turnout		55,012	88.6	+0.5
Notional two-party-preferred count
Labor	Clayton Barr	30,154	76.8	+7.1
National	Ash Barnham (disendorsed)	9,103	23.2	−7.1
Two-candidate-preferred result
Labor	Clayton Barr	29,964	73.4	+3.7
One Nation	Quintin King	10,865	26.6	+26.6
Labor hold				

=== Elections in the 2010s ===
==== 2019 ====
2019 New South Wales state election: Cessnock
Party	Candidate	Votes	%	±%
Labor	Clayton Barr	27,122	54.48	−7.74
National	Josh Angus	12,081	24.27	+1.03
Greens	Janet Murray	4,010	8.06	−0.36
Animal Justice	Chris Parker	3,949	7.93	+7.93
Sustainable Australia	Steve Russell	2,619	5.26	+5.26
Total formal votes		49,781	94.96	−0.64
Informal votes		2,643	5.04	+0.64
Turnout		52,424	89.97	−1.39
Two-party-preferred result
Labor	Clayton Barr	30,229	69.34	−2.67
National	Josh Angus	13,364	30.66	+2.67
Labor hold		Swing	−2.67	

==== 2015 ====
2015 New South Wales state election: Cessnock
Party	Candidate	Votes	%	±%
Labor	Clayton Barr	28,519	62.2	+28.1
National	Jessica Price-Purnell	10,652	23.2	−1.8
Greens	Lindy Williams	3,857	8.4	−0.2
No Land Tax	Domenic Lopreiato	1,465	3.2	+3.2
Christian Democrats	Julie Johnson	1,339	2.9	−0.5
Total formal votes		45,832	95.6	+0.9
Informal votes		2,111	4.4	−0.9
Turnout		47,943	91.4	+1.0
Two-party-preferred result
Labor	Clayton Barr	30,057	72.0	+18.1
National	Jessica Price-Purnell	11,685	28.0	−18.1
Labor hold		Swing	+18.1	

==== 2011 ====
2011 New South Wales state election: Cessnock
Party	Candidate	Votes	%	±%
Labor	Clayton Barr	15,812	34.5	−20.3
National	Alison Davey	11,309	24.7	−6.7
Independent	Dale Troy	8,640	18.8	+18.8
Greens	James Ryan	3,913	8.5	−5.3
Independent	Allan Stapleford	2,297	5.0	+5.0
Independent	Allan McCudden	2,284	5.0	+5.0
Christian Democrats	Wayne Riley	1,598	3.5	+3.5
Total formal votes		45,853	95.3	−1.6
Informal votes		2,240	4.7	+1.6
Turnout		48,093	94.2	+0.1
Two-party-preferred result
Labor	Clayton Barr	18,679	54.4	−8.1
National	Alison Davey	15,687	45.6	+8.1
Labor hold		Swing	−8.1	

=== Elections in the 2000s ===
==== 2007 ====
2007 New South Wales state election: Cessnock
Party	Candidate	Votes	%	±%
Labor	Kerry Hickey	24,026	54.8	−3.8
National	Trevor Hollingshed	13,754	31.4	+12.8
Greens	James Ryan	6,053	13.8	+6.7
Total formal votes		43,833	96.9	−0.4
Informal votes		1,379	3.1	+0.4
Turnout		45,212	94.1	
Two-party-preferred result
Labor	Kerry Hickey	25,347	62.4	−6.7
National	Trevor Hollingshed	15,264	37.6	+6.7
Labor hold		Swing	−6.7	

==== 2003 ====
2003 New South Wales state election: Cessnock
Party	Candidate	Votes	%	±%
Labor	Kerry Hickey	22,843	55.7	+1.2
National	Dale Troy	11,533	28.1	+28.1
Greens	Kerry Suwald	2,926	7.1	+2.1
One Nation	John Bailey	1,573	3.8	−12.2
Independent	Patricia St Lawrence	1,219	3.0	+3.0
Democrats	Graham Capararo	881	2.2	+2.2
Total formal votes		40,975	97.7	−0.4
Informal votes		958	2.3	+0.4
Turnout		41,933	93.8	
Two-party-preferred result
Labor	Kerry Hickey	24,282	65.5	−7.1
National	Dale Troy	12,766	34.5	+34.5
Labor hold		Swing	−7.1	

=== Elections in the 1990s ===
==== 1999 ====
1999 New South Wales state election: Cessnock
Party	Candidate	Votes	%	±%
Labor	Kerry Hickey	21,966	54.6	−4.3
One Nation	Graham Burston	6,462	16.1	+16.1
Liberal	Mark Coure	6,003	14.9	−13.8
Independent	Ian Olsen	3,784	9.4	+9.4
Greens	James Ryan	2,025	5.0	+3.6
Total formal votes		40,240	98.1	+2.8
Informal votes		760	1.9	−2.8
Turnout		41,000	94.8	
Notional two-party-preferred count
Labor	Kerry Hickey	25,287	73.9	+7.6
Liberal	Mark Coure	8,908	26.1	−7.6
Two-candidate-preferred result
Labor	Kerry Hickey	25,813	72.6	+6.3
One Nation	Graham Burston	9,719	27.4	+27.4
Labor hold		Swing	+6.3	

==== 1995 ====
1995 New South Wales state election: Cessnock
Party	Candidate	Votes	%	±%
Labor	Stan Neilly	18,680	55.5	+4.8
Liberal	Robert Symon	10,581	31.4	−9.9
Democrats	Simon Holliday	3,620	10.8	+6.4
Socialist Labour	Terry Cook	775	2.3	+2.3
Total formal votes		33,656	95.7	+4.3
Informal votes		1,516	4.3	−4.3
Turnout		35,172	94.0	
Two-party-preferred result
Labor	Stan Neilly	20,348	63.1	+8.7
Liberal	Robert Symon	11,888	36.9	−8.7
Labor hold		Swing	+8.7	

==== 1991 ====
1991 New South Wales state election: Cessnock
Party	Candidate	Votes	%	±%
Labor	Stan Neilly	15,838	50.7	+5.5
Liberal	Bob Roberts	12,910	41.4	+8.7
Democrats	Denis Rothwell	1,357	4.3	+4.3
Independent	Jim White	1,106	3.5	+3.5
Total formal votes		31,211	91.4	−5.5
Informal votes		2,938	8.6	+5.5
Turnout		34,149	95.3	
Two-party-preferred result
Labor	Stan Neilly	16,612	54.4	+4.8
Liberal	Bob Roberts	13,915	45.6	−4.8
Labor gain from Liberal		Swing	+4.8	

=== Elections in the 1980s ===
==== 1988 ====
1988 New South Wales state election: Cessnock
Party	Candidate	Votes	%	±%
Labor	Stan Neilly	13,987	45.1	−13.8
Liberal	Bob Roberts	10,143	32.7	+18.3
National	Desmond Snelgrove	6,852	22.1	−4.5
Total formal votes		30,982	96.9	−1.2
Informal votes		989	3.1	+1.2
Turnout		31,971	95.8	
Two-party-preferred result
Liberal	Bob Roberts	15,218	50.5	+9.4
Labor	Stan Neilly	14,943	49.5	−9.4
Liberal gain from Labor		Swing	+9.4	

==== 1984 ====
1984 New South Wales state election: Cessnock
Party	Candidate	Votes	%	±%
Labor	Stan Neilly	23,519	76.2	−1.3
Liberal	Gerard Berkhout	7,341	23.8	+5.6
Total formal votes		30,860	97.8	0.0
Informal votes		683	2.2	0.0
Turnout		31,543	94.7	+0.2
Labor hold		Swing	−4.3	

==== 1981 ====
1981 New South Wales state election: Cessnock
Party	Candidate	Votes	%	±%
Labor	Stan Neilly	23,015	77.5	−1.6
Liberal	James White	5,406	18.2	−2.7
Democrats	Gregory Mutton	1,263	4.3	+4.3
Total formal votes		29,684	97.8	
Informal votes		659	2.2	
Turnout		30,343	94.5	
Two-party-preferred result
Labor	Stan Neilly	23,215	80.5	+1.4
Liberal	James White	5,606	19.5	−1.4
Labor hold		Swing	+1.4	

==== 1981 by-election ====
1981 Cessnock by-election Saturday 8 October
Party	Candidate	Votes	%	±%
Labor	Stan Neilly	15,932	70.43	
Liberal	Colin Richardson	3,911	17.29	
Democrats	Elisabeth Kirkby	2,779	12.28	
Total formal votes		22,622	98.91	
Informal votes		250	1.09	
Turnout		22,872	88.74	
Labor hold		Swing		

Bob Brown (Labor) resigned to successfully contest the federal House of Representatives seat of Hunter.

=== Elections in the 1970s ===
==== 1978 ====
1978 New South Wales state election: Cessnock
Party	Candidate	Votes	%	±%
Labor	Bob Brown	18,547	79.1	+2.1
Liberal	Terrence Nicholas	4,894	20.9	−2.1
Total formal votes		23,441	98.4	−0.3
Informal votes		389	1.6	+0.3
Turnout		23,830	95.6	−0.4
Labor hold		Swing	+2.1	

==== 1976 ====
1976 New South Wales state election: Cessnock
Party	Candidate	Votes	%	±%
Labor	George Neilly	17,814	77.0	−1.1
Liberal	Suzan Ross-Gowan	5,327	23.0	+23.0
Total formal votes		23,141	98.7	+1.3
Informal votes		310	1.3	−1.3
Turnout		23,451	96.0	+0.1
Labor hold		Swing	−1.1	

==== 1973 ====
1973 New South Wales state election: Cessnock
Party	Candidate	Votes	%	±%
Labor	George Neilly	17,093	78.1	−2.3
Democratic Labor	Bernard Burke	4,801	21.9	+21.9
Total formal votes		21,894	97.4	
Informal votes		583	2.6	
Turnout		22,477	95.9	
Labor hold		Swing	−2.3	

==== 1971 ====
1971 New South Wales state election: Cessnock
Party	Candidate	Votes	%	±%
Labor	George Neilly	16,251	80.4	+14.5
Liberal	John Thomas	3,972	19.6	+19.6
Total formal votes		20,223	98.8	
Informal votes		251	1.2	
Turnout		20,474	96.0	
Labor hold		Swing	+14.5	

=== Elections in the 1960s ===
==== 1968 ====
1968 New South Wales state election: Cessnock
Party	Candidate	Votes	%	±%
Labor	George Neilly	13,528	65.9	−11.7
Independent	Robert Brown	7,009	34.1	+34.1
Total formal votes		20,537	98.6	
Informal votes		283	1.4	
Turnout		20,820	96.5	
Labor hold		Swing	N/A	

==== 1965 ====
1965 New South Wales state election: Cessnock
Party	Candidate	Votes	%	±%
Labor	George Neilly	14,687	77.6	+11.4
Democratic Labor	Hilton Smith	2,709	14.3	+14.3
Communist	Charles Dumbrell	1,543	8.1	+5.1
Total formal votes		18,939	98.0	−1.0
Informal votes		385	2.0	+1.0
Turnout		19,324	95.2	−0.4
Two-candidate-preferred result
Labor	George Neilly	15,921	84.1	−0.1
Democratic Labor	Hilton Smith	3,018	15.9	+15.9
Labor hold		Swing	N/A	

==== 1962 ====
1962 New South Wales state election: Cessnock
Party	Candidate	Votes	%	±%
Labor	George Neilly	12,754	66.2	+3.8
Independent	Robert Brown	4,000	20.8	+20.8
Liberal	Edward Farrell	1,935	10.0	+10.0
Communist	Stanley Smith	574	3.0	−5.4
Total formal votes		19,263	99.0	
Informal votes		187	1.0	
Turnout		19,450	95.6	
Two-candidate-preferred result
Labor	George Neilly	14,009	72.7	+6.1
Independent	Robert Brown	5,254	27.3	+27.3
Labor hold		Swing	N/A	

=== Elections in the 1950s ===
==== 1959 ====
1959 New South Wales state election: Cessnock
Party	Candidate	Votes	%	±%
Labor	George Neilly	12,740	62.4	
Independent	Charles Haxton	5,972	29.2	
Communist	David Stevenson	1,710	8.4	
Total formal votes		20,422	98.3	
Informal votes		350	1.7	
Turnout		20,772	95.3	
Two-candidate-preferred result
Labor	George Neilly	13,595	66.6	
Independent	Charles Haxton	6,827	33.4	
Labor hold		Swing		

==== 1956 ====
1956 New South Wales state election: Cessnock
Party	Candidate	Votes	%	±%
Labor	John Crook	13,374	69.5	−16.1
Liberal	Harold Hawkes	3,760	19.5	+19.5
Communist	David Stevenson	2,121	11.0	−3.4
Total formal votes		19,255	98.5	+3.4
Informal votes		295	1.5	−3.4
Turnout		19,550	96.5	+1.8
Two-party-preferred result
Labor	John Crook	15,283	79.4	−6.2
Liberal	Harold Hawkes	3,972	20.6	+20.6
Labor hold		Swing	N/A	

==== 1953 ====
1953 New South Wales state election: Cessnock
Party	Candidate	Votes	%	±%
Labor	John Crook	15,145	85.6	
Communist	John Tapp	2,557	14.4	
Total formal votes		17,702	95.1	
Informal votes		908	4.9	
Turnout		18,610	94.7	
Labor hold		Swing		

==== 1950 ====
1950 New South Wales state election: Cessnock
Party	Candidate	Votes	%	±%
Labor	John Crook	15,132	86.7	
Communist	John Tapp	2,319	13.3	
Total formal votes		17,451	97.5	
Informal votes		445	2.5	
Turnout		17,896	95.0	
Labor hold		Swing		

=== Elections in the 1940s ===
==== 1949 by-election ====
1949 Cessnock by-election Saturday 8 October
Party	Candidate	Votes	%	±%
Labor	John Crook	16,204	80.50	
Communist	John Tapp	3,925	19.50	
Total formal votes		20,129	95.83	
Informal votes		877	4.17	
Turnout		21,006	89.99	
Labor hold		Swing		

Jack Baddeley (Labor) resigned to accept the position of Chairman of the State Coal Mine Authority.

==== 1947 ====
1947 New South Wales state election: Cessnock
Party	Candidate	Votes	%	±%
Labor	Jack Baddeley	12,756	60.0	−40.0
Independent Labor	William May	5,323	25.0	+25.0
Communist	Charles Evans	3,200	15.0	+15.0
Total formal votes		21,279	97.7	
Informal votes		510	2.3	
Turnout		21,789	96.3	
Labor hold		Swing	N/A	

- Preferences were not distributed.

==== 1944 ====
1944 New South Wales state election: Cessnock
Party	Candidate	Votes	%	±%
Labor	Jack Baddeley	unopposed		
Labor hold				

==== 1941 ====
1941 New South Wales state election: Cessnock
Party	Candidate	Votes	%	±%
Labor	Jack Baddeley	13,559	68.0	
State Labor	George McGregor	6,370	32.0	
Total formal votes		19,929	97.8	
Informal votes		453	2.2	
Turnout		20,382	94.9	
Labor hold		Swing		

=== Elections in the 1930s ===
==== 1938 ====
1938 New South Wales state election: Cessnock
Party	Candidate	Votes	%	±%
Labor	Jack Baddeley	12,106	69.3	+0.9
Industrial Labor	Eugene O'Neill	5,360	30.7	+30.7
Total formal votes		17,466	97.6	0.0
Informal votes		435	2.4	0.0
Turnout		17,901	96.6	+0.4
Labor hold		Swing	N/A	

==== 1935 ====
1935 New South Wales state election: Cessnock
Party	Candidate	Votes	%	±%
Labor (NSW)	Jack Baddeley	12,099	68.4	−5.1
Independent	Eugene O'Neill	3,827	21.6	+21.6
Communist	Charles Evans	1,764	10.0	+4.9
Total formal votes		17,690	97.6	+0.9
Informal votes		442	2.4	−0.9
Turnout		18,132	96.2	−0.4
Labor (NSW) hold		Swing	N/A	

- Preferences were not distributed.

==== 1932 ====
1932 New South Wales state election: Cessnock
Party	Candidate	Votes	%	±%
Labor (NSW)	Jack Baddeley	12,596	73.5	−19.0
Federal Labor	Joseph Norton	3,656	21.3	+21.3
Communist	Henry Scanlon	877	5.1	−2.4
Total formal votes		17,129	96.7	+2.9
Informal votes		585	3.3	−2.9
Turnout		17,714	96.6	+0.6
Labor (NSW) hold		Swing	N/A	

==== 1930 ====
1930 New South Wales state election: Cessnock
Party	Candidate	Votes	%	±%
Labor	Jack Baddeley	14,808	92.5	
Communist	Joseph Schelley	1,200	7.5	
Total formal votes		16,008	93.8	
Informal votes		1,058	6.2	
Turnout		17,066		
Labor hold		Swing		

=== Elections in the 1920s ===
==== 1927 ====
This section is an excerpt from 1927 New South Wales state election § Cessnock

1927 New South Wales state election: Cessnock
Party	Candidate	Votes	%	±%
Labor	Jack Baddeley	7,736	69.8	
Independent	Malcolm McNeil	3,341	30.2	
Total formal votes		11,077	98.4	
Informal votes		175	1.6	
Turnout		11,252	76.0	
Labor win		(new seat)		

==== 1920–1927 ====
District abolished

=== Elections in the 1910s ===
==== 1917 ====
This section is an excerpt from 1917 New South Wales state election § Cessnock

1917 New South Wales state election: Cessnock
Party	Candidate	Votes	%	±%
Labor	William Kearsley	unopposed		
Labor hold				

==== 1913 ====
1913 New South Wales state election: Cessnock
Party	Candidate	Votes	%	±%
Labor	William Kearsley	5,606	86.8	
Liberal Reform	Charles Cheesbrough	564	8.7	
Socialist Labor	William North	290	4.5	
Total formal votes		6,460	97.7	
Informal votes		150	2.3	
Turnout		6,610	60.3	
Labor win		(new seat)		
