= Electoral results for the district of Liverpool =

Election results for Liverpool, New South Wales, Australia

Liverpool, an electoral district of the Legislative Assembly in the Australian state of New South Wales, has had one incarnation, from 1950 until the present.

== Members for Liverpool ==
Election	Member	Party
1950	James McGirr	Labor
1952 by	Jack Mannix	Labor
1953	Jack Mannix	Labor
1956	Jack Mannix	Labor
1959	Jack Mannix	Labor
1962	Jack Mannix	Labor
1965	Jack Mannix	Labor
1968	Jack Mannix	Labor
1971	George Paciullo	Labor
1973	George Paciullo	Labor
1976	George Paciullo	Labor
1978	George Paciullo	Labor
1981	George Paciullo	Labor
1984	George Paciullo	Labor
1988	George Paciullo	Labor
1989 by	Peter Anderson	Labor
1991	Peter Anderson	Labor
1995	Paul Lynch	Labor
1999	Paul Lynch	Labor
2003	Paul Lynch	Labor
2007	Paul Lynch	Labor
2011	Paul Lynch	Labor
2015	Paul Lynch	Labor
2019	Paul Lynch	Labor
2023	Charishma Kaliyanda	Labor

== Election results ==
=== Elections in the 2020s ===
==== 2023 ====
2023 New South Wales state election: Liverpool
Party	Candidate	Votes	%	±%
Labor	Charishma Kaliyanda	22,681	47.2	−7.9
Liberal	Richard Ammoun	16,409	34.1	+7.8
Independent	Michael Andjelkovic	3,508	7.3	+7.3
Greens	Amy Croft	3,039	6.3	+0.9
Animal Justice	Gabriel Hancock	1,446	3.0	+3.0
	Linda Harris	982	2.0	+2.0
Total formal votes		48,065	94.0	−0.8
Informal votes		3,047	6.0	+0.8
Turnout		51,112	84.4	−1.4
Two-party-preferred result
Labor	Charishma Kaliyanda	24,913	58.3	−9.0
Liberal	Richard Ammoun	17,783	41.7	+9.0
Labor hold		Swing	−9.0	

=== Elections in the 2010s ===
==== 2019 ====
2019 New South Wales state election: Liverpool
Party	Candidate	Votes	%	±%
Labor	Paul Lynch	26,141	55.58	−4.58
Liberal	Paul Zadro	12,692	26.98	+3.31
Independent	Michael Andjelkovic	3,274	6.96	+6.96
Greens	Signe Westerberg	2,421	5.15	+0.85
Keep Sydney Open	Ravneel Chand	1,256	2.67	+2.67
Conservatives	Adam Novek	1,251	2.66	+2.66
Total formal votes		47,035	94.57	−0.07
Informal votes		2,700	5.43	+0.07
Turnout		49,735	86.39	−1.57
Two-party-preferred result
Labor	Paul Lynch	27,951	66.72	−4.17
Liberal	Paul Zadro	13,945	33.28	+4.17
Labor hold		Swing	−4.17	

==== 2015 ====
2015 New South Wales state election: Liverpool
Party	Candidate	Votes	%	±%
Labor	Paul Lynch	27,264	60.2	+9.2
Liberal	Mazhar Hadid	10,728	23.7	−4.2
Christian Democrats	Matt Attia	3,627	8.0	+1.5
Greens	Andre Bosch	1,947	4.3	−0.9
No Land Tax	Mick Pezzano	1,753	3.9	+3.9
Total formal votes		45,319	94.6	+1.3
Informal votes		2,565	5.4	−1.3
Turnout		47,884	88.0	−1.0
Two-party-preferred result
Labor	Paul Lynch	28,842	70.9	+6.9
Liberal	Mazhar Hadid	11,841	29.1	−6.9
Labor hold		Swing	+6.9	

==== 2011 ====
2011 New South Wales state election: Liverpool
Party	Candidate	Votes	%	±%
Labor	Paul Lynch	22,223	51.4	−13.5
Liberal	Mazhar Hadid	11,883	27.5	+9.5
Independent	Michael Byrne	3,740	8.7	+8.7
Christian Democrats	Matt Attia	2,916	6.7	+2.6
Greens	Signe Westerberg	2,451	5.7	+1.7
Total formal votes		43,213	93.9	−1.6
Informal votes		2,828	6.1	+1.6
Turnout		46,041	92.3	
Two-party-preferred result
Labor	Paul Lynch	24,276	64.7	−12.2
Liberal	Mazhar Hadid	13,241	35.3	+12.2
Labor hold		Swing	−12.2	

=== Elections in the 2000s ===
==== 2007 ====
2007 New South Wales state election: Liverpool
Party	Candidate	Votes	%	±%
Labor	Paul Lynch	26,206	64.9	−4.8
Liberal	Ned Mannoun	7,251	18.0	+2.7
Independent	Liliana Ljubicic	2,093	5.2	+5.2
Christian Democrats	Elizabeth Hall	1,686	4.2	+1.7
Greens	Bill Cashman	1,597	4.0	−0.7
AAFI	Ian Gelling	855	2.1	+0.3
Unity	Kek Tai	685	1.7	−0.5
Total formal votes		40,373	95.4	+0.2
Informal votes		1,935	4.6	−0.2
Turnout		42,308	91.6	
Two-party-preferred result
Labor	Paul Lynch	28,036	76.9	−3.7
Liberal	Ned Mannoun	8,410	23.1	+3.7
Labor hold		Swing	−3.7	

==== 2003 ====
2003 New South Wales state election: Liverpool
Party	Candidate	Votes	%	±%
Labor	Paul Lynch	29,097	69.6	+2.6
Liberal	Domenico Acitelli	6,349	15.2	−1.8
Greens	Michael Tierney	2,051	4.9	+4.9
One Nation	Michael Boland	1,402	3.4	−5.5
Christian Democrats	Godwin Goh	1,180	2.8	+2.8
AAFI	Victor Boyd	890	2.1	+0.0
Unity	Ahmad Alameddine	835	2.0	−2.2
Total formal votes		41,804	95.0	−0.9
Informal votes		2,191	5.0	+0.9
Turnout		43,995	92.3	
Two-party-preferred result
Labor	Paul Lynch	30,335	80.7	+2.1
Liberal	Domenico Acitelli	7,246	19.3	−2.1
Labor hold		Swing	+2.1	

=== Elections in the 1990s ===
==== 1999 ====
1999 New South Wales state election: Liverpool
Party	Candidate	Votes	%	±%
Labor	Paul Lynch	26,754	67.0	−3.3
Liberal	David Barker	6,773	17.0	−12.1
One Nation	Rod Smith	3,546	8.9	+8.9
Unity	Ricky Costa	1,662	4.2	+4.2
AAFI	John Coleman	839	2.1	+2.1
Citizens Electoral Council	Steve Henshaw	226	0.6	+0.6
Non-Custodial Parents	Eric Sanders	151	0.4	+0.4
Total formal votes		39,951	96.0	+7.8
Informal votes		1,682	4.0	−7.8
Turnout		41,633	92.3	
Two-party-preferred result
Labor	Paul Lynch	28,153	78.6	+8.0
Liberal	David Barker	7,666	21.4	−8.0
Labor hold		Swing	+8.0	

==== 1995 ====
1995 New South Wales state election: Liverpool
Party	Candidate	Votes	%	±%
Labor	Paul Lynch	24,042	69.1	+11.5
Liberal	Albert Galea	10,733	30.9	+7.1
Total formal votes		34,775	87.9	+2.4
Informal votes		4,774	12.1	−2.4
Turnout		39,549	92.3	
Labor hold		Swing	+2.6	

==== 1991 ====
1991 New South Wales state election: Liverpool
Party	Candidate	Votes	%	±%
Labor	Peter Anderson	16,777	57.6	−2.8
Liberal	Gloria Arora	6,921	23.8	−10.4
Independent	Colin Harrington	4,019	13.8	+13.8
Democrats	Susan Robinson	932	3.2	+1.1
Socialist Labour	Nick Beams	311	1.1	+1.1
Citizens Electoral Council	Albert Perish	150	0.5	+0.5
Total formal votes		29,110	85.5	−9.3
Informal votes		4,943	14.5	+9.3
Turnout		34,053	92.5	
Two-party-preferred result
Labor	Peter Anderson	17,981	66.5	+3.2
Liberal	Gloria Arora	9,060	33.5	−3.2
Labor hold		Swing	+3.2	

=== Elections in the 1980s ===
==== 1989 by-election ====
1989 Liverpool by-election Saturday 29 April
Party	Candidate	Votes	%	±%
Labor	Peter Anderson	10,775	45.6	
Independent	Don Syme	2,610	11.0	
Independent	Noel Short	2,415	10.2	
Independent	Gary Lucas	2,201	9.3	
Independent	Paul Galea	2,031	8.6	
Independent	Casey Conway	1,142	4.8	
Independent	Tony Pascale	1,104	4.7	
Independent	Dianne Baric	942	4.0	
Socialist Alliance	Peter Perkins	152	0.6	
Socialist Labour	Barry Jobson	146	0.6	
Independent	John Phillips	84	0.4	
Independent	Tony Kazan	37	0.2	
Total formal votes		23,639	95.0	
Informal votes		1,257	5.1	
Turnout		24,896	80.5	
Two-party-preferred result
Labor	Peter Anderson	11,947	60.7	
Independent	Don Syme	7,734	39.3	
Labor hold				

George Paciullo (Labor) resigned.

==== 1988 ====
1988 New South Wales state election: Liverpool
Party	Candidate	Votes	%	±%
Labor	George Paciullo	17,024	64.1	−4.2
Liberal	Margaret Brock	9,550	35.9	+10.2
Total formal votes		26,574	95.4	−0.9
Informal votes		1,292	4.6	+0.9
Turnout		27,866	92.2	
Labor hold		Swing	−7.3	

==== 1984 ====
1984 New South Wales state election: Liverpool
Party	Candidate	Votes	%	±%
Labor	George Paciullo	18,382	68.6	−7.9
Liberal	Anthony Garbin	6,552	24.5	+6.7
Independent	David Bransdon	1,855	6.9	+3.7
Total formal votes		26,789	96.1	+0.6
Informal votes		1,073	3.9	−0.6
Turnout		27,862	91.2	+0.5
Two-party-preferred result
Labor	George Paciullo		72.2	−8.2
Liberal	Anthony Garbin		27.8	+8.2
Labor hold		Swing	−8.2	

==== 1981 ====
1981 New South Wales state election: Liverpool
Party	Candidate	Votes	%	±%
Labor	George Paciullo	19,733	76.5	−1.3
Liberal	Raymond Marsh	4,580	17.8	−1.6
Independent	David Bransdon	813	3.2	+3.2
Independent	Patrick Leyman	662	2.6	+2.6
Total formal votes		25,788	95.5	
Informal votes		1,214	4.5	
Turnout		27,002	90.7	
Two-party-preferred result
Labor	George Paciullo	20,033	80.4	−0.4
Liberal	Raymond Marsh	4,880	19.6	+0.4
Labor hold		Swing	−0.4	

=== Elections in the 1970s ===
==== 1978 ====
1978 New South Wales state election: Liverpool
Party	Candidate	Votes	%	±%
Labor	George Paciullo	26,129	77.8	+8.2
Liberal	John Books	5,454	16.2	−14.2
Democrats	Raymond Benn	1,993	5.9	+5.9
Total formal votes		33,576	96.9	−0.2
Informal votes		1,063	3.1	+0.2
Turnout		34,639	93.1	−0.9
Two-party-preferred result
Labor	George Paciullo	27,125	80.8	+11.2
Liberal	John Books	6,451	19.2	−11.2
Labor hold		Swing	+11.2	

==== 1976 ====
1976 New South Wales state election: Liverpool
Party	Candidate	Votes	%	±%
Labor	George Paciullo	22,298	69.6	+2.7
Liberal	Rex Harris	9,762	30.4	+2.8
Total formal votes		32,060	97.1	+1.0
Informal votes		959	2.9	−1.0
Turnout		33,019	94.0	+1.5
Labor hold		Swing	+1.6	

==== 1973 ====
1973 New South Wales state election: Liverpool
Party	Candidate	Votes	%	±%
Labor	George Paciullo	18,622	66.9	+0.2
Liberal	Richard Lennon	7,678	27.6	+4.2
Democratic Labor	Doris Brown	1,526	5.5	−4.4
Total formal votes		27,826	96.1	
Informal votes		1,128	3.9	
Turnout		28,954	92.5	
Two-party-preferred result
Labor	George Paciullo	18,926	68.0	−0.7
Liberal	Richard Lennon	8,900	32.0	+0.7
Labor hold		Swing	−0.7	

==== 1971 ====
1971 New South Wales state election: Liverpool
Party	Candidate	Votes	%	±%
Labor	George Paciullo	18,241	66.7	+10.5
Liberal	Robert Leech	6,404	23.4	−12.8
Democratic Labor	William Arundell	2,692	9.9	+4.2
Total formal votes		27,337	97.3	
Informal votes		755	2.7	
Turnout		28,092	93.4	
Two-party-preferred result
Labor	George Paciullo	18,779	68.7	+7.3
Liberal	Robert Leech	8,558	31.3	−7.3
Labor hold		Swing	+7.3	

=== Elections in the 1960s ===
==== 1968 ====
1968 New South Wales state election: Liverpool
Party	Candidate	Votes	%	±%
Labor	Jack Mannix	15,775	56.2	+1.0
Liberal	Kenneth Laing	10,148	36.2	−0.6
Democratic Labor	Edward Connolly	1,608	5.7	−0.6
Communist	Michael Tubbs	533	1.9	+0.2
Total formal votes		28,064	96.2	
Informal votes		1,105	3.8	
Turnout		29,169	92.3	
Two-party-preferred result
Labor	Jack Mannix	16,523	58.9	+1.6
Liberal	Kenneth Laing	11,541	41.1	−1.6
Labor hold		Swing	+1.6	

==== 1965 ====
1965 New South Wales state election: Liverpool
Party	Candidate	Votes	%	±%
Labor	Jack Mannix	19,906	55.2	−6.1
Liberal	Warren Glenny	13,274	36.8	+3.1
Democratic Labor	Harry Cole	2,278	6.3	+1.3
Communist	Ronald Marriott	597	1.7	+1.7
Total formal votes		36,055	96.3	−1.3
Informal votes		1,375	3.7	+1.3
Turnout		37,430	92.5	−0.4
Two-party-preferred result
Labor	Jack Mannix	20,661	57.3	−5.0
Liberal	Warren Glenny	15,394	42.7	+5.0
Labor hold		Swing	−5.0	

==== 1962 ====
1962 New South Wales state election: Liverpool
Party	Candidate	Votes	%	±%
Labor	Jack Mannix	15,398	61.3	+2.4
Liberal	John Bridge	8,459	33.7	−7.4
Democratic Labor	Kevin Davis	1,265	5.0	+5.0
Total formal votes		25,122	97.6	
Informal votes		620	2.4	
Turnout		25,742	92.9	
Two-party-preferred result
Labor	Jack Mannix	15,651	62.3	+3.4
Liberal	John Bridge	9,471	37.7	−3.4
Labor hold		Swing	+3.4	

=== Elections in the 1950s ===
==== 1959 ====
1959 New South Wales state election: Liverpool
Party	Candidate	Votes	%	±%
Labor	Jack Mannix	14,622	58.9	
Liberal	Ron Dunbier	10,200	41.1	
Total formal votes		24,822	97.5	
Informal votes		627	2.5	
Turnout		25,449	93.7	
Labor hold		Swing		

==== 1956 ====
1956 New South Wales state election: Liverpool
Party	Candidate	Votes	%	±%
Labor	Jack Mannix	unopposed		
Labor hold				

==== 1953 ====
1953 New South Wales state election: Liverpool
Party	Candidate	Votes	%	±%
Labor	Jack Mannix	15,184	72.5	
Liberal	Madge Lee	5,752	27.5	
Total formal votes		20,936	97.5	
Informal votes		535	2.5	
Turnout		21,471	93.7	
Labor hold		Swing		

==== 1952 by-election ====
1952 Liverpool by-election Saturday 24 May
Party	Candidate	Votes	%	±%
Labor	Jack Mannix	14,079	68.8	
Liberal	Bernard Fitzpatrick	6,380	31.2	
Total formal votes		20,459	97.9	
Informal votes		432	2.1	
Turnout		20,891	86.4	
Labor hold		Swing		

Jim McGirr (Labor) resigned.

==== 1950 ====
1950 New South Wales state election: Liverpool
Party	Candidate	Votes	%	±%
Labor	James McGirr	12,381	62.4	
Liberal	Bernard Fitzpatrick	6,935	34.9	
Communist	Don Syme	527	2.7	
Total formal votes		19,843	98.0	
Informal votes		401	2.0	
Turnout		20,244	92.4	
Two-party-preferred result
Labor	James McGirr		64.0 (Note: Two party preferred vote was estimated.)	
Liberal	Bernard Fitzpatrick		36.0	
Labor notional hold				
