= 1989 Liverpool state by-election =

Election result for Liverpool, New South Wales, Australia

A by-election was held for the New South Wales Legislative Assembly electorate of Liverpool on 29 April 1989 because of the resignation of George Paciullo (Labor), after being passed over as leader of the party. The Labor pre-selection was the subject of a bitter battle between Mark Latham from the right wing faction and Paul Lynch from the left. Peter Anderson from the right was imposed by the Labor national executive.

== Dates ==
Date	Event
19 February 1989	Resignation of George Paciullo.
10 April 1989	Writ of election issued by the Speaker of the Legislative Assembly and close of electoral rolls.
14 April 1989	Nominations
29 April 1989	Polling day
19 May 1989	Return of writ

== Result ==
1989 Liverpool by-election Saturday 29 April
Party	Candidate	Votes	%	±%
Labor	Peter Anderson	10,775	45.6	
Independent	Don Syme	2,610	11.0	
Independent	Noel Short	2,415	10.2	
Independent	Gary Lucas	2,201	9.3	
Independent	Paul Galea	2,031	8.6	
Independent	Casey Conway	1,142	4.8	
Independent	Tony Pascale	1,104	4.7	
Independent	Dianne Baric	942	4.0	
Socialist Alliance	Peter Perkins	152	0.6	
Socialist Labour	Barry Jobson	146	0.6	
Independent	John Phillips	84	0.4	
Independent	Tony Kazan	37	0.2	
Total formal votes		23,639	95.0	
Informal votes		1,257	5.1	
Turnout		24,896	80.5	
Two-party-preferred result
Labor	Peter Anderson	11,947	60.7	
Independent	Don Syme	7,734	39.3	
Labor hold				

== See also ==
- Electoral results for the district of Liverpool
- List of New South Wales state by-elections
