= 1981 Cessnock state by-election =

Election result for Cessnock, New South Wales, Australia

A by-election for the seat of Cessnock in the New South Wales Legislative Assembly was held on 21 February 1981. The by-election was triggered by the resignation of Bob Brown (Labor) to successfully contest the federal House of Representatives seat of Hunter at the 1980 election.

By-elections for the seats of Maitland, Oxley and Sturt were held on the same day.

== Dates ==
| Date | Event |
|---|---|
| 22 January 1981 | Writ of election issued by the Speaker of the Legislative Assembly and close of electoral rolls. |
| 29 January 1981 | Close of nominations |
| 21 February 1981 | Polling day, between the hours of 8 am and 6 pm |
| 13 March 1981 | Return of writ |

== Results ==
1981 Cessnock by-election Saturday 8 October
| Party | Candidate | Votes | % | ±% |
|---|---|---|---|---|
| Labor | Stan Neilly | 15,932 | 70.43 | |
| Liberal | Colin Richardson | 3,911 | 17.29 | |
| Democrats | Elisabeth Kirkby | 2,779 | 12.28 | |
| Total formal votes | | 22,622 | 98.91 | |
| Informal votes | | 250 | 1.09 | |
| Turnout | | 22,872 | 88.74 | |
| Labor hold | | Swing | | |

== See also ==
- Electoral results for the district of Cessnock
- List of New South Wales state by-elections
