= Foley shadow ministry =

Shadow ministry of Australia (2014–2018)

The shadow ministry of Luke Foley was the Labor opposition from December 2014 to November 2018, opposing the Baird and Berejiklian coalition governments in the Parliament of New South Wales. The shadow ministry comprised 'spokespeople' or 'shadow ministers' who aim to hold the government of the day to account.

== Third arrangement (2016–2018) ==
The shadow ministry was made up of 22 members of the NSW Labor caucus. This arrangement commenced in March 2016.

Officeholder	Office(s)
Luke Foley MP	Leader of the Opposition; Shadow Minister for Western Sydney
Michael Daley MP	Deputy Leader of the Opposition; Shadow Minister for Planning and Infrastructure; Shadow Minister for Gaming and Racing
Walt Secord MLC	Deputy Leader of the Opposition in the Legislative Council; Shadow Minister for Health; Shadow Minister for the Arts; Shadow Minister for the North Coast
Ryan Park MP	Shadow Treasurer; Shadow Minister for the Illawarra
Adam Searle MLC	Leader of the Opposition in the Legislative Council; Shadow Minister for Industry, Energy and Resources; Shadow Minister for Industrial Relations
Jodi McKay MP	Shadow Minister for Transport; Shadow Minister for Roads, Maritime and Freight
Jihad Dib MP	Shadow Minister for Education
Penny Sharpe MLC	Shadow Minister for the Environment and Heritage; Shadow Minister for Trade, Tourism and Major Events
Paul Lynch MP	Shadow Attorney-General
Tania Mihailuk MP	Shadow Minister for Family and Community Services; Shadow Minister for Social Housing; Shadow Minister for Mental Health; Shadow Minister for Medical Research
Sophie Cotsis MP	Shadow Minister for Women; Shadow Minister for Ageing; Shadow Minister for Disability Services; Shadow Minister for Multiculturalism
Peter Primrose MLC	Shadow Minister for Local Government
Guy Zangari MP	Shadow Minister for Justice and Police; Shadow Minister for Corrections; Shadow Minister for Emergency Services
Kate Washington MP	Shadow Minister for Early Childhood Education; Shadow Minister for the Hunter
Mick Veitch MLC	Shadow Minister for Primary Industries; Shadow Minister for Lands; Shadow Minister for Western NSW
Prue Car MP	Shadow Minister for Skills; Shadow Assistant Minister for Education
David Harris MP	Shadow Minister for Regional Development; Shadow Minister for Aboriginal Affairs; Shadow Minister for the Central Coast
Clayton Barr MP	Shadow Minister for Finance, Services and Property
Jenny Aitchison MP	Shadow Minister for the Prevention of Domestic Violence and Sexual Assault; Shadow Minister for Small Business
Yasmin Catley MP	Shadow Minister for Innovation and Better Regulation
Chris Minns MP	Shadow Minister for Water
Lynda Voltz MLC	Shadow Minister for Sport; Shadow Minister for Veterans Affairs

== Second arrangement (2015–2016) ==
The shadow ministry was made up of 22 members of the NSW Labor caucus.

Officeholder	Office(s)
Luke Foley MP	Leader of the Opposition; Shadow Minister for the Arts; Shadow Minister for Racing; Shadow Minister for Western Sydney
Linda Burney MP	Deputy Leader of the Opposition; Shadow Minister for Education; Shadow Minister for Aboriginal Affairs
Adam Searle MLC	Leader of the Opposition in the Legislative Council; Shadow Minister for Industry, Energy and Resources; Shadow Minister for Industrial Relations
Walt Secord MLC	Deputy Leader of the Opposition in the Legislative Council; Shadow Minister for Health; Shadow Minister for the North Coast
Michael Daley MP	Shadow Treasurer
Ryan Park MP	Shadow Minister for Transport and Infrastructure; Shadow Minister for the Illawarra
Paul Lynch MP	Shadow Attorney-General
Penny Sharpe MLC	Shadow Minister for Planning; Shadow Minister for the Environment; Shadow Minister for Heritage
Tania Mihailuk MP	Shadow Minister for Family and Community Services; Shadow Minister for Social Housing; Shadow Minister for Mental Health; Shadow Minister for Medical Research
Jodi McKay MP	Shadow Minister for Justice and Police; Shadow Minister for Roads, Maritime and Freight
Sophie Cotsis MLC	Shadow Minister for Ageing; Shadow Minister for Disability Services; Shadow Minister for Multiculturalism
Peter Primrose MLC	Shadow Minister for Local Government; Shadow Minister for Innovation and Better Regulation
Guy Zangari MP	Shadow Minister for Trade, Tourism and Major Events; Shadow Minister for Sport; Shadow Minister for Corrections; Shadow Minister for Emergency Services; Shadow Minister for Veterans Affairs
Mick Veitch MLC	Shadow Minister for Primary Industries; Shadow Minister for Lands and Water; Shadow Minister for Western NSW
David Harris MP	Shadow Minister for Regional Development; Shadow Minister for Skills; Shadow Minister for Small Business; Shadow Minister for the Central Coast
Jodie Harrison MP	Shadow Minister for Women; Shadow Minister for the Prevention of Domestic Violence & Sexual Assault; Shadow Minister for Early Childhood Education; Shadow Minister for the Hunter
Clayton Barr MP	Shadow Minister for Finance, Services and Property

== First arrangement (2015) ==
The shadow ministry was made up of sixteen members of the NSW Labor caucus.

Officeholder	Office(s)
Luke Foley MLC	Leader of the Opposition; Shadow Minister for Infrastructure; Shadow Minister for the Environment; Shadow Minister for Western Sydney
Linda Burney MP	Deputy Leader of the Opposition; Leader of the Opposition in the Legislative Assembly; Shadow Minister for Family and Community Services; Shadow Minister for Ageing and Disability Services; Shadow Minister for Early Childhood Education; Shadow Minister for Aboriginal Affairs; Shadow Minister for the Central Coast
Michael Daley MP	Shadow Treasurer; Shadow Minister for Roads and Freight
Ms Penny Sharpe (Note: Resigned from the Legislative Council in March 2015 to unsuccessfully contest the Legislative Assembly.)	Shadow Minister for Transport
Walt Secord MLC	Shadow Minister for Health; Shadow Minister for Liquor Regulation; Shadow Minister for the North Coast
Mr Steve Whan	Shadow Minister for Police; Shadow Minister for Resources and Primary Industries; Shadow Minister for Tourism Major Events Hospitality and Racing; Shadow Minister for Rural Water
Ryan Park MP	Shadow Minister for Education and Training; Shadow Minister for the Illawarra
Paul Lynch MP	Shadow Attorney-General; Shadow Minister for Justice
Adam Searle MLC	Deputy Leader of the Opposition in the Legislative Council; Shadow Minister for Energy and Climate Change; Shadow Minister for Industrial Relations; Shadow Minister for Small Business
Peter Primrose MLC	Shadow Minister for Finance and Services; Shadow Minister for Water; Shadow Special Minister of State; Shadow Minister Assisting the Leader on Western Sydney
Sophie Cotsis MLC	Shadow Minister for Local Government; Shadow Minister for Housing; Shadow Minister for Mental Health; Shadow Minister for the Status of Women
Mick Veitch MLC	Shadow Minister for Trade and Investment; Shadow Minister for Regional Infrastructure and Services; Shadow Minister for Regional and Rural Affairs; Shadow Minister for Western NSW
Ms Jodi McKay (Note: Former MP. Endorsed as the Labor candidate for the seat of Strathfield.)	Shadow Minister for Planning
Tania Mihailuk MP	Shadow Minister for Fair Trading; Shadow Minister for Healthy Lifestyles; Shadow Minister for Volunteering and Youth
Ron Hoenig MP	Shadow Minister for Emergency Services; Shadow Minister for Heritage
Guy Zangari MP	Shadow Minister for Citizenship and Communities; Shadow Minister for Sport and Recreation
Sonia Hornery MP	Shadow Minister for Science and Medical Research; Shadow Minister for the Arts; Shadow Minister for the Hunter

== See also ==
- 2015 New South Wales state election
