= Robertson shadow ministry =

The shadow ministry of John Robertson was the Labor opposition from March 2011 to December 2014, opposing the O'Farrell and Baird coalition governments in the Parliament of New South Wales. Robertson's shadow ministry was initially made up of 15 members of the NSW Labor Party caucus, later expanding to 18 members. The shadow cabinet was made up of 'spokesman/women' or 'shadow ministers' whose jobs are to hold the government of the day to account.

== Initial arrangement ==
The first arrangement of the shadow ministry was announced on 11 April 2011. A minor reshuffle was announced in June 2011 following the resignation of Tony Kelly from the Parliament. Tania Mihailuk replaced Cherie Burton in the shadow ministry in October 2011.

Officeholder	Office(s)
John Robertson MP	Leader of the Opposition; Shadow Minister for Western Sydney; Shadow Minister for the Illawarra
Linda Burney MP	Deputy Leader of the Opposition; Shadow Minister for Planning, Infrastructure and Heritage; Shadow Minister for Sport and Recreation; Shadow Minister for the Hunter; Shadow Minister for the Central Coast
Michael Daley MP	Shadow Treasurer; Shadow Minister for Finance and Services
Tony Kelly MLC	Shadow Minister for Roads and Ports (until 6 June 2011); Shadow Minister for Resources and Primary Industries (until 6 June 2011); Shadow Minister for Tourism, Major Events, Hospitality and Racing (until 6 June 2011); Leader of the Opposition in the Legislative Council (until 6 June 2011)
Carmel Tebbutt MP	Shadow Minister for Education & Training
Andrew McDonald MP	Shadow Minister for Health; Shadow Minister for Medical Research
Penny Sharpe MLC	Shadow Minister for Transport
Paul Lynch MP	Shadow Attorney-General; Shadow Minister for Justice
Nathan Rees MP	Shadow Minister for Police and Emergency Services; Shadow Minister for the Arts
Luke Foley MLC	Shadow Minister for Environment and Climate Change; Shadow Minister for Water; Shadow Minister for Energy; Shadow Special Minister of State (until 14 June 2011); Deputy Leader of the Opposition in the Legislative Council (until 14 June 2011); Leader of the Opposition in the Legislative Council (from 14 June 2011)
Barbara Perry MP	Shadow Minister for Family and Community Services; Shadow Minister for Aboriginal Affairs; Shadow Minister for Ageing; Shadow Minister for Disability Services
Cherie Burton MP	Shadow Minister for Fair Trading (until 21 October 2011); Shadow Minister for Healthy Lifestyles (until 21 October 2011); Shadow Minister for Volunteering and Youth (until 21 October 2011)
Robert Furolo MP	Shadow Minister for Mental Health (until 20 June 2011); Shadow Minister for Housing (until 20 June 2011); Shadow Minister for Small Business (until 20 June 2011)
Robert Furolo MP	Shadow Minister for Roads and Ports (from 20 June 2011); Shadow Minister for Citizenship and Communities (from 20 June 2011)
Mick Veitch MLC	Shadow Minister for Trade & Investment; Shadow Minister for Regional Infrastructure & Services; Shadow Minister for Regional & Rural Affairs
Sophie Cotsis MLC	Shadow Minister for Local Government; Shadow Minister for Industrial Relations; Shadow Minister for the Status of Women; Shadow Minister for Citizenship and Communities (until 20 June 2011)
Steve Whan MLC	Shadow Minister for Resources and Primary Industry (from 20 June 2011); Shadow Minister for Tourism, Major Events, Hospitality and Racing (from 20 June 2011); Shadow Special Minister of State (from 20 June 2011)
Adam Searle MLC	Shadow Minister for Mental Health (from 20 June 2011); Shadow Minister for Housing (from 20 June 2011); Shadow Minister for Small Business (from 20 June 2011); Deputy Leader of the Opposition in the Legislative Council (from 14 June 2011)
Tania Mihailuk MP	Shadow Minister for Fair Trading (from 21 October 2011); Shadow Minister for Healthy Lifestyles (from 21 October 2011); Shadow Minister for Volunteering and Youth (from 21 October 2011)

== Second arrangement ==
The second arrangement of the Shadow Ministry was announced on 17 October 2012.

Officeholder	Office(s)
John Robertson MP	Leader of the Opposition; Shadow Minister for Western Sydney; Shadow Minister for the Illawarra
Linda Burney MP	Deputy Leader of the Opposition; Shadow Minister for Family and Community Services; Shadow Minister for Aboriginal Affairs; Shadow Minister for Sport and Recreation; Shadow Minister for the Hunter; Shadow Minister for the Central Coast
Michael Daley MP	Shadow Treasurer; Shadow Minister for Finance and Services
Carmel Tebbutt MP	Shadow Minister for Education & Training
Andrew McDonald MP	Shadow Minister for Health; Shadow Minister for Medical Research
Luke Foley MLC	Shadow Minister for Environment and Climate Change; Shadow Minister for Planning and Infrastructure; Leader of the Opposition in the Legislative Council
Steve Whan MLC	Shadow Minister for Resources and Primary Industry; Shadow Minister for Tourism, Major Events, Hospitality and Racing; Shadow Minister for Rural Water
Penny Sharpe MLC	Shadow Minister for Transport
Paul Lynch MP	Shadow Attorney-General; Shadow Minister for Justice
Nathan Rees MP	Shadow Minister for Police and Emergency Services; Shadow Minister for the Arts
Ryan Park MP	Shadow Minister for Roads
Barbara Perry MP	Shadow Minister for Ageing; Shadow Minister for Disability Services; Shadow Minister for Mental Health; Shadow Minister for Heritage
Adam Searle MLC	Shadow Minister for Industrial Relations; Shadow Minister for Small Business; Deputy Leader of the Opposition in the Legislative Council
Mick Veitch MLC	Shadow Minister for Trade and Investment; Shadow Minister for Regional Infrastructure and Services; Shadow Minister for Regional and Rural Affairs
Sophie Cotsis MLC	Shadow Minister for Local Government; Shadow Minister for Housing; Shadow Minister for the Status of Women
Tania Mihailuk MP	Shadow Minister for Fair Trading; Shadow Minister for Healthy Lifestyles; Shadow Minister for Volunteering and Youth
Ron Hoenig MP	Shadow Minister for Energy; Shadow Minister for Ports
Walt Secord MLC	Shadow Minister for Water; Shadow Special Minister of State
Guy Zangari MP	Shadow Minister for Citizenship and Communities

== Final arrangement ==
Officeholder	Office(s)
John Robertson MP	Leader of the Opposition; Shadow Minister for Western Sydney
Linda Burney MP	Deputy Leader of the Opposition; Shadow Minister for Family & Community Services; Shadow Minister for Early Childhood Education; Shadow Minister for Aboriginal Affairs; Shadow Minister for the Central Coast
Michael Daley MP	Shadow Treasurer; Shadow Minister for Roads
Luke Foley MLC	Shadow Minister for Environment and Climate Change; Shadow Minister for Planning & Infrastructure; Leader of the Opposition in the Legislative Council
Penny Sharpe MLC	Shadow Minister for Transport
Steve Whan MLC	Shadow Minister for Police; Shadow Minister for Resources & Primary Industries; Shadow Minister for Tourism, Major Events, Hospitality & Racing; Shadow Minister for Rural Water
Ryan Park MP	Shadow Minister for Education & Training; Shadow Minister for the Illawarra
Paul Lynch MP	Shadow Attorney-General; Shadow Minister for Justice
Walt Secord MLC	Shadow Minister for Health; Shadow Minister for Liquor Regulation; Shadow Minister for the North Coast
Barbara Perry MP	Shadow Minister for Ageing; Shadow Minister for Disability Services; Shadow Minister for Mental Health; Shadow Minister for Heritage
Adam Searle MLC	Shadow Minister for Industrial Relations; Shadow Minister for Energy; Shadow Minister for Small Business; Deputy Leader of the Opposition in the Legislative Council
Mick Veitch MLC	Shadow Minister for Trade & Investment; Shadow Minister for Regional Infrastructure & Services; Shadow Minister for Regional & Rural Affairs.
Sophie Cotsis MLC	Shadow Minister for Local Government; Shadow Minister for Housing; Shadow Minister for the Status of Women
Tania Mihailuk MP	Shadow Minister for Fair Trading; Shadow Minister for Healthy Lifestyles; Shadow Minister for Volunteering & Youth
Ron Hoenig MP	Shadow Minister for Ports; Shadow Minister for Emergency Services
Peter Primrose MLC	Shadow Minister for Finance and Services; Shadow Minister for Water; Shadow Special Minister of State; Shadow Minister Assisting the Leader on Western Sydney
Guy Zangari MP	Shadow Minister for Citizenship & Communities; Shadow Minister for Sport and Recreation
Sonia Hornery MP	Shadow Minister for Science & Medical Research; Shadow Minister for the Arts; Shadow Minister for the Hunter

== See also ==
- 2011 New South Wales state election
