= 1949 Cessnock state by-election =

Election result for Cessnock, New South Wales, Australia

A by-election for the seat of Cessnock in the New South Wales Legislative Assembly was held on 8 October 1949. The by-election was triggered by the resignation of Jack Baddeley (Labor) to accept the position of Chairman of the State Coal Mine Authority.

A by-election for the seat of Redfern was held on the same day.

== Dates ==
Date	Event
8 September 1949	Jack Baddeley resigned.
14 September 1949	Writ of election issued by the Speaker of the Legislative Assembly.
20 September 1949	Close of nominations
8 October 1949	Polling day
8 November 1949	Return of writ

== Results ==
1949 Cessnock by-election Saturday 8 October
Party	Candidate	Votes	%	±%
Labor	John Crook	16,204	80.50	
Communist	John Tapp	3,925	19.50	
Total formal votes		20,129	95.83	
Informal votes		877	4.17	
Turnout		21,006	89.99	
Labor hold		Swing		

== See also ==
- Electoral results for the district of Cessnock
- List of New South Wales state by-elections
