= Michael Veitch (disambiguation) =

Michael Veitch may refer to:

- Michael Veitch (born 1962), Australian comedian, broadcaster and writer
- Michael Veitch (politician) (born 1962), Australian politician
- Michael Veitch (darts player) (born 1960), Scottish darts player
