= 1952 Liverpool state by-election =

Election result for Liverpool, New South Wales, Australia

A by-election was held for the New South Wales Legislative Assembly electorate of Liverpool on 24 May 1952 because of the resignation of Jim McGirr (Labor) who had accepted an appointment as chair of the Maritime Services Board.

== Dates ==
Date	Event
3 April 1952	Jim McGirr resigned.
2 April 1952	Writ of election issued by the Speaker of the Legislative Assembly.
2 May 1952	Nominations
24 May 1952	Polling day
20 June 1952	Return of writ

== Result ==
1952 Liverpool by-election Saturday 24 May
Party	Candidate	Votes	%	±%
Labor	Jack Mannix	14,079	68.8	
Liberal	Bernard Fitzpatrick	6,380	31.2	
Total formal votes		20,459	97.9	
Informal votes		432	2.1	
Turnout		20,891	86.4	
Labor hold		Swing		

== See also ==
- Electoral results for the district of Liverpool
- List of New South Wales state by-elections
