= Bob Roberts (Australian politician) =

Australian politician

Robert Gordon Arthur Roberts (born 21 September 1952) is an Australian politician, elected as the Member for Cessnock of the New South Wales Legislative Assembly for the Liberal Party between 1988 and 1991. This was the only time since its creation in 1913 that Cessnock was not held by the Labor Party. He defeated longtime Labor incumbent Stan Neilly amid the Liberals' 1988 landslide. Neilly led on the first count, but National preferences flowed overwhelmingly to Roberts on the second count, allowing Roberts to win by less than 300 votes. Neilly retook the seat in a 1991 rematch.

He was born in Singleton, New South Wales. Prior to entering Parliament, he was a Councillor of the City of Maitland and from 1987 of the Singleton Council. In 1993, he stood unsuccessfully for election for the federal seat of Paterson.

New South Wales Legislative Assembly
Preceded by Stan Neilly	Member for Cessnock; 1988 – 1991	Succeeded by Stan Neilly
