= Clayton Barr =

Politician in New South Wales, Australia

Clayton Barr MP
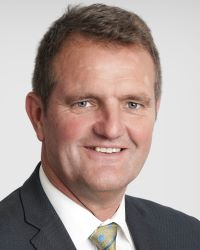

Member of the New South Wales Legislative Assembly for Cessnock
- Incumbent
- Assumed office 26 March 2011
- Preceded by: Kerry Hickey

Shadow Minister for Finance, Services and Property
- In office 9 April 2015 – 3 July 2019
- Leader: Luke Foley; Michael Daley
- Preceded by: Peter Primrose
- Succeeded by: Daniel Mookhey

Shadow Minister for Innovation, Science and Tertiary Education
- In office 3 July 2019 – 11 June 2021
- Leader: Jodi McKay
- Preceded by: Yasmin Catley
- Succeeded by: Courtney Houssos (Innovation); Tim Crakanthorp (Tertiary Education)

Shadow Minister for the Hunter
- In office 3 July 2019 – 11 June 2021
- Leader: Jodi McKay
- Preceded by: Kate Washington
- Succeeded by: Yasmin Catley

Personal details
- Born: 1971 (age 54–55) Cessnock, New South Wales
- Party: Labor Party
- Education: University of Newcastle
- Occupation: School teacher local government administration
- Website: www.claytonbarr.com.au

Clayton Gordon Barr (born 1971) is an Australian politician who was elected to the New South Wales Legislative Assembly as the member for Cessnock for the Labor Party at the 2011 state election. Before entering parliament he had a career as a secondary education teacher and an employee of the children's cancer charity Canteen, and worked in local government administration.

== Background and education ==
Barr was born in Cessnock, New South Wales to Margaret and Gordon Barr. The youngest of four, Barr spent his early years in Cessnock and completed his secondary education at All Saints College, Maitland.

Barr then matriculated to the University of Newcastle, where he studied in the Faculty of Education and Arts, graduating in 1994 with a Bachelor of Education in Physical Education and Health. He taught in the PDHPE faculty at Mount View High School for nine years, before seeking a change in vocation where he became a manager at the young people's cancer charity, Canteen.

In the 18 months before his election to the Legislative Assembly, Barr was a community and recreational facilities planner at Port Stephens Council.

Barr is married to Lisa and has four children. He is a keen water poloist and for 15 years was a committee member of Cessnock Water Polo Club and a member of the Newcastle Water Polo Executive.

== Political career ==
In the lead-up to the 2011 state election, Barr received a threat in the mail aimed at his pregnant wife and children. His wife opened the letter which said: "Clay pulls out or I start shooting kids." Barr reported the threat to the NSW Police. Despite this attempt to have him withdraw his candidacy, Barr was elected as the state member for Cessnock in 2011, despite an 8.1-point swing to the New South Wales Nationals candidate.

He was preselected again as the Labor candidate for Cessnock for the 2015 New South Wales state election, winning the seat with a two-party-preferred 72.0%.

In April 2015 Barr was appointed to the Shadow Ministry of Luke Foley as the Shadow Minister for Finance, Services and Property, where he was responsible for analysing the NSW government's policy proposals concerning government finances, major public works and maintenance programs, government procurement, and information and communications technology.

At the 2019 New South Wales state election, Barr again contested the seat of Cessnock for Labor. Despite measuring a small swing against him, Barr won the seat with two-party-preferred 69.3%. Following the elevation of Jodi McKay to the position of Leader of the Opposition in June 2019, Barr was appointed as the Shadow Minister for Innovation, Science and Tertiary Education, Shadow Minister for the Hunter and the Shadow Minister for Water.

He held these positions until June 2021, when he was demoted to the backbench by the newly appointed Leader of the Opposition Chris Minns as a result of factional disagreements.

New South Wales Legislative Assembly
Preceded by Kerry Hickey	Member for Cessnock; 2011–present	Incumbent
