= George Neilly =

Australian politician

George Henry Neilly (3 March 1917 – 6 May 1987) was an Australian politician. He was a member of the New South Wales Parliament from 1954 to 1977. He was a member of the Labor Party (ALP).

Neilly was born in the Hunter Valley coal mining town of Kurri Kurri. He was the son of a carter and was educated to 8th grade level at Maitland High School. At age 17 he became a coal miner at Abermain Colliery. He was an office-holder in the Miners' Federation and was general secretary of the Northern Lodge of the union from 1954 to 1959.

He saw service during World War II on HMAS Australia.

In 1954 he was elected to the New South Wales Legislative Council through an indirect election by the New South Wales Parliament. He was elected for the balance of the term of Francis Buckley who resigned from parliament.

He won ALP pre-selection for the seat of Cessnock at the 1959 state election. He won the seat replacing the previous member John Crook.

He retired due to ill health prior to the state election of 1978. He was the father of Stan Neilly who was also a member for the seat of Cessnock.

New South Wales Legislative Assembly
Preceded by John Crook	Member for Cessnock; 1959 – 1978	Succeeded by Bob Brown
