= Kerry Hickey =

Australian politician

The Honourable Kerry Hickey

Minister for Local Government
- In office 3 August 2005 – 2 April 2007
- Leader: Morris Iemma
- Preceded by: Tony Kelly
- Succeeded by: Paul Lynch

Minister for Mineral Resources
- In office 2 April 2003 – 3 August 2005
- Leader: Bob Carr
- Preceded by: Eddie Obeid
- Succeeded by: Ian Macdonald

Member of the New South Wales Legislative Assembly for Cessnock
- In office 27 March 1999 – 26 March 2011
- Preceded by: Stan Neilly
- Succeeded by: Clayton Barr

Personal details
- Born: Kerry Arthur Hickey; 6 April 1960 (age 66)
- Party: Labor Party
- Spouse(s): Nadine (divorced); Stephanie (2010-present)
- Children: 5
- Occupation: Metal fabricator, milk vendor

Kerry Arthur Hickey (born 6 April 1960), a former Australian politician, was a member of the New South Wales Legislative Assembly representing the electorate of Cessnock between 1999 and 2011 for the Labor Party.

== Early years and background ==
Prior to entering politics, Hickey was a metal fabricator prior to 1982 and subsequently he was a milk vendor. In 1981 he was elected as a Councillor of the City of Cessnock.

== Political career ==
He was Minister for Mineral Resources from April 2003 to August 2005, and was Minister for Local Government between 2005 and 2007.

On 7 November 2006, he admitted to having been fined four times in recent years for speeding:

- $590 in October 2006 for being more than 30 kilometres per hour (19 mph) over the limit
- $225 in August 2005 for being more than 15 kilometres per hour (9.3 mph) over the limit
- $127 in 2003
- $118 in 2002

The Premier, Morris Iemma resisted calls to sack him as result. He was quoted as saying:

I'm disappointed that it happened. Like any other motorist, no one is above the law, whether you are a minister, a member of Parliament or a member of the general public. He has apologised, I've accepted that. Is it a sackable offence? No, but I am very disappointed that it has happened. He's suffering public humiliation as a result.

In an interview with the Newcastle Herald, published on 10 July 2010, Hickey claimed that he was not the father of a child born in February 2009 to an unnamed parliamentary staff member. A month later, on further questioning by the media, Hickey admitted that he had lied about his relationship with the parliamentary staff member and admitted that the 18-month-old child was his. In a dramatic day of lying about his relationship, Hickey initially decided to resign, but after speaking with the Premier Kristina Keneally, he issued a statement stating that he would be seeking re-election. Hickey's initial claims were made in order to protect the mother's career and his family.

Under mounting political and personal pressure, on 6 September 2010 Hickey announced his decision to not seek re-election at the 2011 state election, citing personal reasons.

New South Wales Legislative Assembly
Preceded by Stan Neilly	Member for Cessnock; 1999–2011	Succeeded by Clayton Barr
Political offices
Preceded by Tony Kelly	Minister for Local Government; 2005–2007	Succeeded by Paul Lynch
Political offices
Preceded by Eddie Obeid	Minister for Mineral Resources; 2003–2005	Succeeded by Ian Macdonald
