= Don Syme (politician) =

Australian politician, activist and communist

Dominic Bernard Syme (28 October 1921 – 15 April 2013) was an Australian local politician, activist and prominent communist in New South Wales.

He was born in Redfern to James Syme and Annie Sheriff. He grew up in Kogarah and attended the Marist Brothers school, before leaving at age 14 to work as an apprentice bricklayer in order to help his family during the Depression years.

In 1940 he bought a small poultry farm at Moorebank, 27 kilometers southwest of Sydney, and became secretary of the Australian Poultry Farmers' Association. He served in Papua New Guinea during World War II, but he contracted malaria and was discharged on medical grounds in 1943.

He was briefly a member of the Labor Party but in 1938 joined the Communist Party of Australia (CPA). In 1952, he married fellow communist Kathleen Elsie Stringer, and adopted her three children by a previous marriage, Robyn, Wendy and Lynette "Lyn" Syme.

Don and Kathleen were both prominent communists in the 1950s. In the 1960s and 1970s, Syme became an active opponent of the Vietnam War as an unjust invasion. He was also a feminist and conservationist who supported aboriginal land rights, and in common with the CPA he opposed the Soviet Union's invasion of Czechoslovakia in 1968.

In the 1970s he focused on conservation, and campaigned against sand mining on the Georges River. He was brutally assaulted in his home in 1976, which he attributed to his local activism.

In 1980 he was elected to Liverpool City Council, where he served for fifteen years. On council he played a key role in establishing the Chipping Norton Lake recreation area, turning the lifeless former sand mine on the Georges River into a lush wildlife reserve and recreational area.

His wife, Kathleen, died at age 77 in 2003. Don Syme died at the age of 91 in April 2013. He was survived by Kathleen's daughters Wendy, Robyn and Lyn, as well as their daughters Nell and Nolene, and by nine grandchildren.
