= Paul Lynch (politician) =

Australian politician

Paul Lynch MP
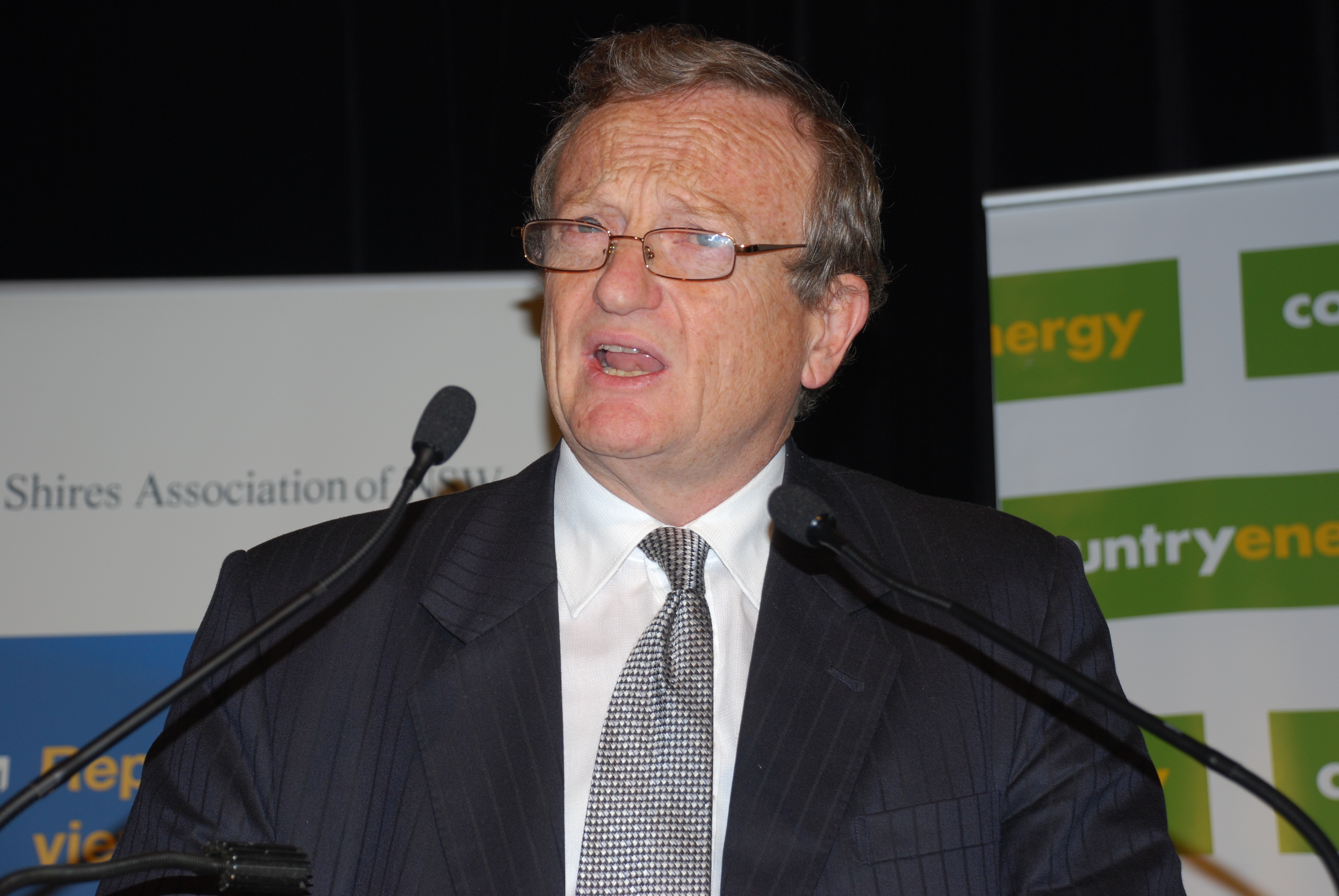

Member of the New South Wales Parliament for Liverpool
- In office 25 March 1995 – 3 March 2023
- Preceded by: Peter Anderson
- Succeeded by: Charishma Kaliyanda
Ministerial offices 2007–2011
Minister for Aboriginal Affairs
In office 2 April 2007 – 28 March 2011
Premier	Morris Iemma; Nathan Rees; Kristina Keneally
Preceded by	Reba Meagher
Succeeded by	Victor Dominello
Minister for Commerce, Energy, Industrial Relations and Public Sector Reform
In office 21 May 2010 – 28 March 2011
Premier	Kristina Keneally
Preceded by	John Robertson
Succeeded by	Greg Pearce (as Minister for Finance); Chris Hartcher (as Minister for Energy and Resources)
Minister for Ageing and Disability Services
In office 8 September 2008 – 21 May 2010
Premier	Nathan Rees; Kristina Keneally
Preceded by	Kristina Keneally
Succeeded by	Peter Primrose
Minister for Local Government
In office 2 April 2007 – 5 September 2008
Premier	Morris Iemma
Preceded by	Kerry Hickey
Succeeded by	Barbara Perry

Personal details
- Born: Paul Gerard Lynch; 1954 or 1955 (age 71–72)
- Party: Labor Party
- Profession: Solicitor

Paul Gerard Lynch is a former Australian politician. He was a member of the New South Wales Legislative Assembly representing Liverpool for the Labor Party from 1995 until 2023.

== Early career and background ==
Lynch graduated with a Bachelor of Arts (Hons) and a LLB and was elected as a Councillor on Liverpool City Council in 1987 until his election to NSW Parliament in 1995. During this period he served as Deputy Mayor and served on the Western Suburbs Regional Organisation of Councils. Lynch originally ran for Labor Party preselection for Liverpool in 1989, but was defeated by Peter Anderson. A prominent member of the party's left-wing faction, Lynch gained his revenge on the right-wing Anderson when Anderson failed to cement support amongst his local party members and lost party pre-selection.

He is the brother in-law of former federal members of parliament Laurie Ferguson and Martin Ferguson.

== Parliamentary career ==
=== Government ===
Elected to NSW Parliament in 1995, he was Temporary Chairman of Committees and Chair of the Committee on the Office of the Ombudsman and Police Integrity Commission. Lynch was re-elected on 24 March 2007 and was appointed Minister for Local Government, Minister for Aboriginal Affairs and Minister Assisting the Minister for Health (Mental Health) in the Iemma ministry. With the appointment of Nathan Rees as premier, he became the Minister for Ageing, Minister for Disability Services and Minister for Aboriginal Affairs. In the Keneally ministry, Lynch retained the Aboriginal Affairs portfolio, and took on responsibility for Industrial Relations, Commerce, Energy, and Public Sector Reform.

=== Opposition ===
Following the Labor's loss at the 2011 state election, Lynch was appointed to the John Robertson shadow ministry as Shadow Attorney General and Shadow Minister for Justice. He retained these positions in the shadow Ministry of Luke Foley. After the 2015 New South Wales state election, Lynch retained his position as Shadow Attorney General but was succeeded as Shadow Minister for Justice by Jodi McKay. He continued to retain this position in the Shadow ministries of Michael Daley and Jodi McKay but was not appointed to the Shadow Ministry of Chris Minns in 2021. He retired at the 2023 New South Wales state election less than two years later.

New South Wales Legislative Assembly
Preceded by Peter Anderson	Member for Liverpool; 1995–2023	Succeeded by Charishma Kaliyanda
Political offices
Preceded by Reba Meagher	Minister for Aboriginal Affairs; 2007–2011	Succeeded by Victor Dominello
Preceded by John Robertson	Minister for Commerce, Energy, Industrial Relations and Public Sector Reform; 2010–2011	Succeeded by Greg Pearce as Minister for Finance
Preceded by John Robertson	Minister for Commerce, Energy, Industrial Relations and Public Sector Reform; 2010–2011	Succeeded by Chris Hartcher as Minister for Energy and Resources
Preceded by Kristina Keneally	Minister for Ageing and Disability Services; 2008–2010	Succeeded by Peter Primrose
Preceded by Kerry Hickey	Minister for Local Government; 2007–2008	Succeeded by Barbara Perry
Preceded by Cherie Burton	Minister Assisting the Minister for Health (Mental Health); 2007–2008	Succeeded by Barbara Perry
