= Stan Neilly =

Australian politician (1942–2022)

Stanley Thomas Neilly (11 March 1942 – 17 January 2022) was an Australian politician. He was the Labor Party member for Cessnock in the New South Wales Legislative Assembly from 1981 to 1988 and from 1991 to 1999.

== Biography ==
Neilly was born in Abermain, New South Wales, the son of politician George Neilly. He attended the local state schools and then Cessnock Technical College, qualifying as an accountant in 1963. In 1959 he had joined the Labor Party; this was the year his father was elected as the Labor member for the state seat of Cessnock. Neilly worked as a local government officer from 1957 to 1981 for both Sydney City Council and Cessnock City Council.

Neilly's father retired at the 1978 state election and was succeeded in the seat of Cessnock by Bob Brown. In 1980, Brown resigned to contest the federal House of Representatives, and Neilly was selected as the Labor candidate to stand in the by-election, which was held in early 1981. The seat had a very large Labor margin and Neilly was easily elected, and held the seat in the 1981 and 1984 elections. However, in 1988 Cessnock underwent major boundary changes and he was defeated by Liberal candidate Bob Roberts, losing by fewer than 300 votes after National preferences flowed overwhelmingly to Roberts.

He was the Labor candidate again in 1991, easily defeating Roberts. He held the seat until his retirement in 1999, leaving a healthy margin to his successor Kerry Hickey.

New South Wales Legislative Assembly
Preceded by Bob Brown	Member for Cessnock; 1981–1988	Succeeded by Bob Roberts
Preceded by Bob Roberts	Member for Cessnock; 1991–1999	Succeeded by Kerry Hickey
