= John Crook (politician) =

Australian politician (1895–1970)

John William Crook (14 November 1895 – 4 July 1970) was an Australian politician. He was a member of the New South Wales Legislative Assembly from 1949 to 1959. He was a member of the Labor Party (ALP).

Neilly was born in Korumburra. He was the son of a miner and was educated to elementary level at Kurri Kurri Public School. At age 13 he became a coal miner and worked mainly at Richmond Main Colliery. He was an office-holder in the Miners' Federation and was general secretary of the Northern Lodge of the union from 1934 to 1949.

He won ALP pre-selection for the seat of Cessnock at a 1949 by-election caused by the resignation of Jack Baddeley to accept a position with the New South Wales State Coal Authority. He won the by-election and subsequent elections in 1950, 1953 and 1956. He did not contest the 1959 election and was succeeded by George Neilly.

New South Wales Legislative Assembly
Preceded by Jack Baddeley	Member for Cessnock; 1949–1959	Succeeded by George Neilly
