= Electoral district of Cessnock =

Cessnock New South Wales—Legislative Assembly
- Interactive map of district boundaries from the 2023 state election
- State: New South Wales
- Dates current: 1913–1920; 1927–present
- MP: Clayton Barr
- Party: Labor Party
- Namesake: Cessnock, New South Wales
- Electors: 62,098 (2023)
- Area: 4,389.03 km^{2} (1,694.6 sq mi)
- Demographic: Provincial and rural
Electorates around Cessnock:
Upper Hunter	Upper Hunter	Maitland
Hawkesbury	Cessnock	Wallsend; Lake Macquarie
Hawkesbury	Gosford	Wyong

Cessnock is an electoral district of the Legislative Assembly in the Australian state of New South Wales in the rural fringe of the Hunter. It is represented by Clayton Barr of the Labor Party. It includes all of the City of Cessnock (including Cessnock and Kurri Kurri) and a small part of the City of Lake Macquarie (including Barnsley and West Wallsend).

== History ==
Cessnock was created in 1913, but was abolished in 1920, with the introduction of proportional representation and absorbed into Maitland. It was recreated in 1927 and included much of the Central Coast until the creation of Gosford in 1950. It has historically been a safe Labor seat.

At the 2007 election, it encompassed all of City of Cessnock, a small part of the City of Newcastle (including Beresfield and Tarro), a small part of the City of Lake Macquarie (including Barnsley and West Wallsend) and a small part of Singleton Council (including Belford). At the 2013 redistribution it gained Broke, Milbrodale and Wollombi from Upper Hunter and lost Beresfield and Tarro to Wallsend.

== Members for Cessnock ==
First incarnation (1913—1920)
Member	Party	Term
William Kearsley	Labor	1913–1920
Second incarnation (1927—present)
Member	Party	Term
Jack Baddeley	Labor	1927–1949
John Crook	Labor	1949–1959
George Neilly	Labor	1959–1978
Bob Brown	Labor	1978–1980
Stan Neilly	Labor	1981–1988
Bob Roberts	Liberal	1988–1991
Stan Neilly	Labor	1991–1999
Kerry Hickey	Labor	1999–2011
Clayton Barr	Labor	2011–present

== Election results ==
2023 New South Wales state election: Cessnock
Party	Candidate	Votes	%	±%
Labor	Clayton Barr	25,719	48.7	−6.1
One Nation	Quintin King	8,059	15.3	+15.3
Legalise Cannabis	Andrew Fenwick	6,294	11.9	+11.9
National	Ash Barnham (disendorsed)	5,877	11.1	−12.8
Greens	Llynda Nairn	3,476	6.6	−1.5
Animal Justice	Victoria Davies	2,141	4.1	−3.9
Sustainable Australia	Graham Jones	1,215	2.3	−2.9
Total formal votes		52,781	95.9	+1.0
Informal votes		2,231	4.1	−1.0
Turnout		55,012	88.6	+0.5
Notional two-party-preferred count
Labor	Clayton Barr	30,154	76.8	+7.1
National	Ash Barnham (disendorsed)	9,103	23.2	−7.1
Two-candidate-preferred result
Labor	Clayton Barr	29,964	73.4	+3.7
One Nation	Quintin King	10,865	26.6	+26.6
Labor hold				
