= Mick Veitch =

Australian politician

The Honourable Mick Veitch
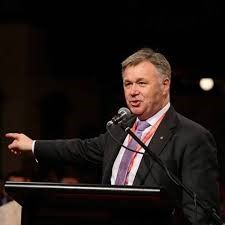

Member of New South Wales Legislative Council
- In office 24 March 2007 – 3 March 2023
Shadow Minister 2011–2023
Shadow Minister for Western New South Wales
In office 9 April 2015 – 28 March 2023
| Leader | Luke Foley; Michael Daley; Jodi McKay; Chris Minns |
| Succeeded by | Sarah Mitchell |
Shadow Minister for Regional New South Wales
In office 12 June 2021 – 28 March 2023
| Leader | Chris Minns |
| Preceded by | Himself (as Shadow Minister for Regional New South Wales) |
| Succeeded by | Dugald Saunders |
Shadow Minister for Agriculture
In office 12 June 2021 – 28 March 2023
| Leader | Chris Minns |
| Preceded by | Jenny Aitchison (as Shadow Minister for Primary Industries) |
| Succeeded by | Dugald Saunders |
Shadow Minister for Rural Affairs
In office 27 November 2018 – 11 June 2021
| Leader | Michael Daley; Jodi McKay |
| Preceded by | Himself (as Shadow Minister for Regional and Rural Affairs) |
| Succeeded by | Himself (as Shadow Minister for Regional New South Wales) |
Shadow Minister for Industry and Trade
In office 3 July 2019 – 11 June 2021
| Leader | Jodi McKay |
| Succeeded by | Anoulack Chanthivong |
Shadow Minister for Rural Roads
In office 3 July 2019 – 11 June 2021
| Leader | Jodi McKay |
| Succeeded by | Jenny Aitchison |
Shadow Minister for Primary Industries
In office 9 April 2015 – 3 July 2019
| Leader | Luke Foley; Michael Daley |
Shadow Minister for Lands
In office 10 March 2016 – 3 July 2019
| Leader | Luke Foley; Michael Daley |
| Preceded by | Himself (as Minister for Lands and Water) |
Shadow Minister for Lands and Water
In office 9 April 2015 – 10 March 2016
| Leader | Luke Foley |
| Succeeded by | Himself (as Shadow Minister for Lands); Chris Minns (as Shadow Minister for Water) |

Member of the Young Shire Council
- In office 1995–2007

Personal details
- Born: 19 December 1962 (age 63) Gundagai, New South Wales, Australia
- Party: Labor; Independent (Note: When elected to Council, Veitch stood as an independent.)
- Children: 4
- Education: Adelong Central School; Tumut High School
- Occupation: Politician

Michael Stanley Veitch (born 19 December 1962) is an Australian politician who served as a Labor Party member of the New South Wales Legislative Council. Veitch was a member of the council from 2007 to 2023.

== Early life ==
Veitch was born at Gundagai, New South Wales to parents Bob and Val. He is the oldest of five children. He attended Adelong Central School in his primary school years. His secondary studies were undertaken at Tumut High School.

== Early career ==
Leaving high school, he worked as a shearer, a train station assistant and a disability worker. He finished his railway career as an Assistant Station Master at Rydalmere and Toongabbie train stations. He completed further studies at TAFE. He became the Executive Officer of the Wiradjuri Country Community Group Limited and then the General Manager (Growth and Strategy) of Job Centre Australia Limited.

== Political career ==
He joined the Labor Party in March 1989 He became the Secretary of the Young Branch of the Labor Party. He has been a delegate to the NSW ALP State Conference and the National Conference.

He was elected as an independent shire councillor for Young Shire Council in September 1995. He was re-elected in 1999 and 2004.

In 1998, he ran as the Labor Party candidate for the federal seat of Hume (a Liberal/National coalition safe seat). He was unsuccessful in that campaign, losing to Liberal Party candidate Alby Schultz.

Veitch was deputy chair of the nine-member Southern Area Health Board for New South Wales.

Veitch was elected on 24 March 2007 to the New South Wales Legislative Council with the 19th-highest quota at that election. He was a member of the Socialist Left faction of Labor. He served as Deputy Government Whip, Parliamentary Secretary for Primary Industries and on numerous Legislative Council Committees. He served on the Opposition front bench from 2011 holding responsibility for Trade and Investment, Regional Infrastructure and Services and Regional and Rural Affairs. He is subsequently served as Shadow Minister for Primary Industries, Lands and Western NSW.

At the 2022 NSW Labor Conference, he was not endorsed for a winnable seat at the 2023 state election, securing the ninth position on the ticket. He was not elected.

== Personal life ==
He is divorced and has four children, and six grandchildren. He and his former wife were foster parents.
